= 2020 Henry 180 =

NASCAR Xfinity Series race

Race details
- Race 18 of 33 in the 2020 NASCAR Xfinity Series
- Date: August 8, 2020
- Location: Road America in Elkhart Lake, Wisconsin
- Course: Permanent racing facility
- Course length: 4.048 miles (6.515 km)
- Distance: 45 laps, 182.16 mi (293.16 km)

Pole position
Driver	Michael Annett	JR Motorsports
- Grid positions set by ballot

Most laps led
Driver	Austin Cindric	Team Penske
- Laps: 19

Winner
No. 22	Austin Cindric	Team Penske

Television in the United States
- Network: NBCSN
- Announcers: Dave Burns, Jeff Burton, Dale Jarrett
- Nielsen ratings: 779,000

Radio in the United States
- Radio: MRN
- Booth announcers: Mike Bagley, Kurt Becker
- Turn announcers: Woody Cain, Steve Post, Dan Hubbard, Jim Tretow, Eric Morse, Tim Catalfamo, Jason Toy, Chris Wilner

The 2020 Henry 180 was a NASCAR Xfinity Series race held on August 8, 2020 at Road America in Elkhart Lake, Wisconsin. Contested over 45 laps on the 4.045-mile (6.510 km) road course, it was the 18th race of the 2020 NASCAR Xfinity Series season. Austin Cindric won his fourth race of the season, which was his fourth victory in the last five races.

== Report ==
=== Background ===
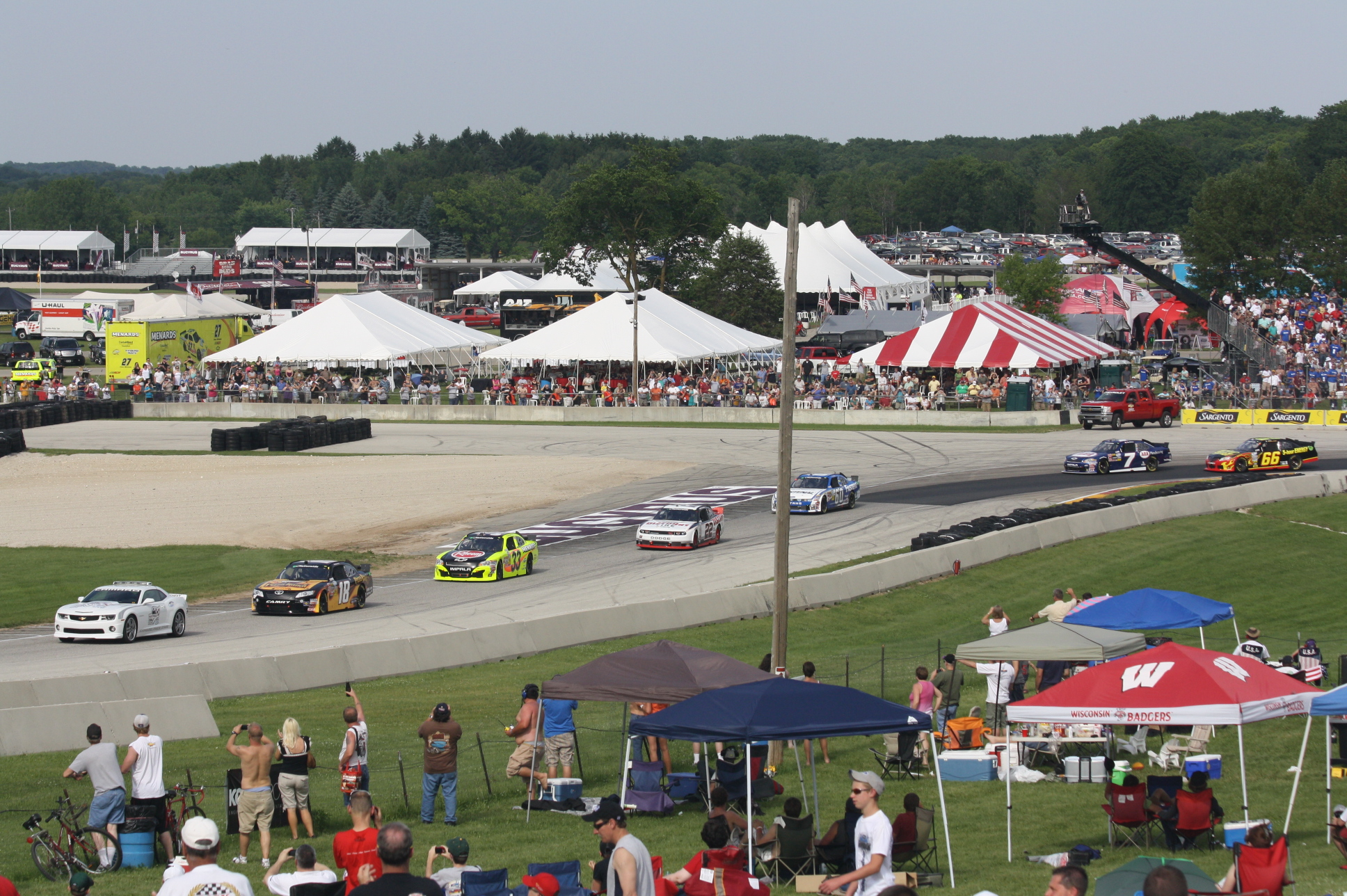
A section of Road America, the track where the race was held.

Road America is a motorsport road course located near Elkhart Lake, Wisconsin on Wisconsin Highway 67. It has hosted races since the 1950s and currently hosts races in the NASCAR Xfinity Series, NTT Indycar Series, NTTWeatherTech SportsCar Championship, SCCA Pirelli World Challenge, ASRA, AMA Superbike series, IndyCar Series, and SCCA Pro Racing's Trans-Am Series.

This was the first Xfinity Series race to allow fans to attend since March due to the COVID-19 pandemic.

=== Modified Pit Procedures ===
Due to the race being held at a separate venue from the Cup Series and the subsequent need to use alternate pit crew members, NASCAR implemented alternate pit procedures for the Henry 180. The field was frozen at the time of the caution, and each team could change only fuel or tires during each stop (multiple changes would require multiple pit stops during the same pit cycle). Additionally, there was a time limit set for pit road: A minimum of 60 seconds for green flag stops and a maximum of 80 seconds for stops under caution. Tire changes were not allowed under green flag stops unless NASCAR specifically permitted it.

=== Entry list ===
- (R) denotes rookie driver.
- (i) denotes driver who is ineligible for series driver points.

No.	Driver	Team	Manufacturer
0	Mike Wallace	JD Motorsports	Chevrolet
1	Michael Annett	JR Motorsports	Chevrolet
02	Andy Lally	Our Motorsports	Chevrolet
4	Jesse Little (R)	JD Motorsports	Chevrolet
5	Vinnie Miller	B. J. McLeod Motorsports	Chevrolet
6	Jade Buford	JD Motorsports	Chevrolet
7	Justin Allgaier	JR Motorsports	Chevrolet
07	R. C. Enerson	SS-Green Light Racing	Chevrolet
8	Daniel Hemric	JR Motorsports	Chevrolet
08	Joe Graf Jr. (R)	SS-Green Light Racing	Chevrolet
9	Noah Gragson	JR Motorsports	Chevrolet
10	Ross Chastain	Kaulig Racing	Chevrolet
11	Justin Haley	Kaulig Racing	Chevrolet
13	Jesse Iwuji (i)	MBM Motorsports	Toyota
15	Jeffrey Earnhardt	JD Motorsports	Chevrolet
16	A. J. Allmendinger	Kaulig Racing	Chevrolet
18	Riley Herbst (R)	Joe Gibbs Racing	Toyota
19	Brandon Jones	Joe Gibbs Racing	Toyota
20	Harrison Burton (R)	Joe Gibbs Racing	Toyota
21	Kaz Grala	Richard Childress Racing	Chevrolet
22	Austin Cindric	Team Penske	Ford
36	Preston Pardus	DGM Racing	Chevrolet
39	Ryan Sieg	RSS Racing	Chevrolet
44	Tommy Joe Martins	Martins Motorsports	Chevrolet
47	Kyle Weatherman	Mike Harmon Racing	Chevrolet
51	Jeremy Clements	Jeremy Clements Racing	Chevrolet
52	Kody Vanderwal (R)	Means Racing	Chevrolet
61	Stephen Leicht	Hattori Racing	Toyota
66	Chad Finchum	MBM Motorsports	Toyota
68	Brandon Brown	Brandonbilt Motorsports	Chevrolet
74	Bayley Currey (i)	Mike Harmon Racing	Chevrolet
78	Scott Heckert	B. J. McLeod Motorsports	Toyota
90	Alex Labbé	DGM Racing	Chevrolet
92	Josh Williams	DGM Racing	Chevrolet
93	Myatt Snider (R)	RSS Racing	Chevrolet
98	Chase Briscoe	Stewart-Haas Racing	Ford
99	Josh Bilicki	B. J. McLeod Motorsports	Toyota
Official entry list

== Qualifying ==
Michael Annett was awarded the pole for the race as determined by a random draw; his third straight race drawing the pole position.

=== Starting Lineup ===
Pos	No	Driver	Team	Manufacturer
1	1	Michael Annett	JR Motorsports	Chevrolet
2	22	Austin Cindric	Team Penske	Ford
3	20	Harrison Burton (R)	Joe Gibbs Racing	Toyota
4	11	Justin Haley	Kaulig Racing	Chevrolet
5	18	Riley Herbst (R)	Joe Gibbs Racing	Toyota
6	21	Kaz Grala	Richard Childress Racing	Chevrolet
7	98	Chase Briscoe	Stewart-Haas Racing	Ford
8	19	Brandon Jones	Joe Gibbs Racing	Toyota
9	9	Noah Gragson	JR Motorsports	Chevrolet
10	8	Daniel Hemric	JR Motorsports	Chevrolet
11	10	Ross Chastain	Kaulig Racing	Chevrolet
12	7	Justin Allgaier	JR Motorsports	Chevrolet
13	68	Brandon Brown	Brandonbilt Motorsports	Chevrolet
14	4	Jesse Little (R)	JD Motorsports	Chevrolet
15	61	Stephen Leicht	Hattori Racing	Toyota
16	39	Ryan Sieg	RSS Racing	Chevrolet
17	15	Jeffrey Earnhardt	JD Motorsports	Chevrolet
18	51	Jeremy Clements	Jeremy Clements Racing	Chevrolet
19	6	Jade Buford	JD Motorsports	Chevrolet
20	0	Mike Wallace	JD Motorsports	Chevrolet
21	90	Alex Labbé	DGM Racing	Chevrolet
22	92	Josh Williams	DGM Racing	Chevrolet
23	02	Andy Lally	Our Motorsports	Chevrolet
24	07	R. C. Enerson	SS-Green Light Racing	Chevrolet
25	74	Bayley Currey (i)	Mike Harmon Racing	Chevrolet
26	08	Joe Graf Jr. (R)	SS-Green Light Racing	Chevrolet
27	78	Scott Heckert	B. J. McLeod Motorsports	Toyota
28	52	Kody Vanderwal (R)	Means Racing	Chevrolet
29	93	Myatt Snider (R)	RSS Racing	Chevrolet
30	99	Josh Bilicki	B. J. McLeod Motorsports	Toyota
31	66	Chad Finchum	MBM Motorsports	Toyota
32	47	Kyle Weatherman	Mike Harmon Racing	Chevrolet
33	16	A. J. Allmendinger	Kaulig Racing	Chevrolet
34	5	Matt Mills	B. J. McLeod Motorsports	Chevrolet
35	13	Jesse Iwuji (i)	MBM Motorsports	Toyota
36	44	Tommy Joe Martins	Martins Motorsports	Chevrolet
37	36	Preston Pardus	DGM Racing	Chevrolet
Official starting lineup

- The No. 5 of Vinnie Miller had to start from the rear due to a driver change (Miller replaced Matt Mills).
- The No. 93 of Myatt Snider had to start from the rear due to unapproved adjustments.

== Race ==
=== Race results ===
==== Stage Results ====
Stage One

Laps: 14

Pos	No	Driver	Team	Manufacturer	Points
1	11	Justin Haley	Kaulig Racing	Chevrolet	10
2	22	Austin Cindric	Team Penske	Ford	9
3	98	Chase Briscoe	Stewart-Haas Racing	Ford	8
4	10	Ross Chastain	Kaulig Racing	Chevrolet	7
5	02	Andy Lally	Our Motorsports	Chevrolet	6
6	7	Justin Allgaier	JR Motorsports	Chevrolet	5
7	1	Michael Annett	JR Motorsports	Chevrolet	4
8	99	Josh Bilicki	B. J. McLeod Motorsports	Toyota	3
9	6	Jade Buford	JD Motorsports	Chevrolet	2
10	07	R. C. Enerson	SS-Green Light Racing	Chevrolet	1

Stage Two

Laps: 15

Pos	No	Driver	Team	Manufacturer	Points
1	16	A. J. Allmendinger	Kaulig Racing	Chevrolet	10
2	10	Ross Chastain	Kaulig Racing	Chevrolet	9
3	11	Justin Haley	Kaulig Racing	Chevrolet	8
4	99	Josh Bilicki	B. J. McLeod Motorsports	Toyota	7
5	02	Andy Lally	Our Motorsports	Chevrolet	6
6	21	Kaz Grala	Richard Childress Racing	Chevrolet	5
7	68	Brandon Brown	Brandonbilt Motorsports	Chevrolet	4
8	6	Jade Buford	JD Motorsports	Chevrolet	3
9	1	Michael Annett	JR Motorsports	Chevrolet	2
10	78	Scott Heckert	B. J. McLeod Motorsports	Toyota	1

=== Final Stage Results ===
Laps: 16

Pos	Grid	No	Driver	Team	Manufacturer	Laps	Points	Status
1	2	22	Austin Cindric	Team Penske	Ford	45	49	Running
2	33	16	A. J. Allmendinger	Kaulig Racing	Chevrolet	45	45	Running
3	7	98	Chase Briscoe	Stewart-Haas Racing	Ford	45	42	Running
4	6	21	Kaz Grala	Richard Childress Racing	Chevrolet	45	38	Running
5	23	02	Andy Lally	Our Motorsports	Chevrolet	45	44	Running
6	9	9	Noah Gragson	JR Motorsports	Chevrolet	45	31	Running
7	11	10	Ross Chastain	Kaulig Racing	Chevrolet	45	46	Running
8	37	36	Preston Pardus	DGM Racing	Chevrolet	45	29	Running
9	16	39	Ryan Sieg	RSS Racing	Chevrolet	45	28	Running
10	1	1	Michael Annett	JR Motorsports	Chevrolet	45	33	Running
11	4	11	Justin Haley	Kaulig Racing	Chevrolet	45	44	Running
12	13	68	Brandon Brown	Brandonbilt Motorsports	Chevrolet	45	29	Running
13	22	92	Josh Williams	DGM Racing	Chevrolet	45	24	Running
14	8	19	Brandon Jones	Joe Gibbs Racing	Toyota	45	23	Running
15	21	90	Alex Labbé	DGM Racing	Chevrolet	45	22	Running
16	3	20	Harrison Burton (R)	Joe Gibbs Racing	Toyota	45	21	Running
17	30	99	Josh Bilicki	B. J. McLeod Motorsports	Toyota	45	30	Running
18	36	44	Tommy Joe Martins	Martins Motorsports	Chevrolet	45	19	Running
19	19	6	Jade Buford	JD Motorsports	Chevrolet	45	23	Running
20	24	07	R. C. Enerson	SS-Green Light Racing	Chevrolet	45	18	Running
21	23	47	Kyle Weatherman	Mike Harmon Racing	Chevrolet	45	16	Running
22	15	61	Stephen Leicht	Hattori Racing	Toyota	45	15	Running
23	5	18	Riley Herbst (R)	Joe Gibbs Racing	Toyota	45	14	Running
24	20	0	Mike Wallace	JD Motorsports	Chevrolet	45	13	Running
25	26	08	Joe Graf Jr. (R)	SS-Green Light Racing	Chevrolet	45	12	Running
26	35	13	Jesse Iwuji (i)	MBM Motorsports	Toyota	45	0	Running
27	28	52	Kody Vanderwal (R)	Means Racing	Chevrolet	43	10	Engine
28	14	4	Jesse Little (R)	JD Motorsports	Chevrolet	43	9	Running
29	18	51	Jeremy Clements	Jeremy Clements Racing	Chevrolet	42	8	Accident
30	12	7	Justin Allgaier	JR Motorsports	Chevrolet	41	12	Accident
31	17	15	Jeffrey Earnhardt	JD Motorsports	Chevrolet	41	6	Accident
32	29	93	Myatt Snider (R)	RSS Racing	Chevrolet	41	5	Accident
33	27	78	Scott Heckert	B. J. McLeod Motorsports	Toyota	41	5	Running
34	34	5	Vinnie Miller	B. J. McLeod Motorsports	Chevrolet	10	3	Engine
35	10	8	Daniel Hemric	JR Motorsports	Chevrolet	7	2	Engine
36	31	66	Chad Finchum	MBM Motorsports	Toyota	5	1	Transmission
37	25	74	Bayley Currey (i)	Mike Harmon Racing	Chevrolet	0	0	Engine
Official race results

=== Race statistics ===
- Lead changes: 13 among 9 different drivers
- Cautions/Laps: 7 for 15
- Red flags: 1
- Time of race: 2 hours, 56 minutes, 37 seconds
- Average speed: 61.83 mph (99.51 km/h)

== Media ==
=== Television ===
The Henry 180 was carried by NBCSN in the United States. Dave Burns, Jeff Burton, and Dale Jarrett called the race from NBC Sports's studios in Charlotte, NC, with Parker Kligerman covering pit road.

NBCSN
Booth announcers	Pit reporter
Lap-by-lap: Dave Burns Color-commentator: Jeff Burton Color-commentator: Dale Jarrett	Parker Kligerman

=== Radio ===
The Motor Racing Network (MRN) called the race for radio, which was simulcast on SiriusXM NASCAR Radio. Mike Bagley and Kurt Becker called the action from the booth. Woody Cain, Steve Post, Dan Hubbard, Jim Tretow, Eric Morse, Tim Catalfamo, Jason Toy, and Chris Wilner called the action from the turns. Pete Pistone and Hannah Newhouse provided reports from pit road.

Motor Racing Network
Booth announcers	Turn announcers	Pit reporters
Lead announcer: Mike Bagley Announcer: Kurt Becker	Woody Cain Steve Post Dan Hubbard Jim Tretow Eric Morse Tim Catalfamo Jason Toy Chris Wilner	Pete Pistone Hannah Newhouse

== Standings after the race ==
Drivers' Championship standings

	Pos	Driver	Points
	1	Austin Cindric	771
	2	Chase Briscoe	760 (-11)
1	3	Ross Chastain	708 (-63)
1	4	Noah Gragson	697 (-74)
	5	Justin Haley	636 (-135)
	6	Harrison Burton (R)	608 (-163)
	7	Justin Allgaier	598 (-173)
	8	Michael Annett	543 (-228)
	9	Brandon Jones	523 (-248)
1	10	Ryan Sieg	436 (-335)
1	11	Riley Herbst (R)	424 (-347)
	12	Brandon Brown	403 (-368)
Official driver's standings

- Note: Only the first 12 positions are included for the driver standings.
- . – Driver has clinched a position in the NASCAR playoffs.

Previous race: 2020 Kansas Lottery 250	NASCAR Xfinity Series; 2020 season	Next race: 2020 UNOH 188
