= Johnny White (racing driver, born 1985) =

American racing driver (born 1985)

- Born: March 30, 1985 (age 41); Bakersfield, California, U.S.

ARCA Menards Series West career
- 13 races run over 1 year
- Best finish: 9th (2015)
- First race: 2015 NAPA Auto Parts 150 (Kern)
- Last race: 2015 Casino Arizona 100 (Phoenix)
Wins	Top tens	Poles
0	6	0
- Statistics up to date as of November 20, 2024.

Johnny White (born March 30, 1985) is an American professional stock car racing driver who competed in the NASCAR K&N Pro Series West in 2015, driving for Steve Portenga Racing.

White has also competed in series such as the SRL Spears Southwest Tour Series, the USAC West Coast Sprint Car Series, the Legends Tour Series, and the MMI Legends Tour West Series.

== Motorsports results ==
=== NASCAR ===
(key) (Bold - Pole position awarded by qualifying time. Italics - Pole position earned by points standings or practice time. * – Most laps led.)

==== K&N Pro Series West ====
NASCAR K&N Pro Series West results
Year	Team	No.	Make	1	2	3	4	5	6	7	8	9	10	11	12	13	14	15	NKNPSWC	Pts	Ref
2012	Steve McGowan Motorsports	19	Chevy	PHO	LHC; DNQ	MMP	S99	IOW	BIR	LVS	SON	EVG	CNS	IOW	PIR	SMP	AAS	PHO	78th	21	
2015	Steve Portenga Racing	31	Chevy	KCR; 7	IRW; 10	TUS; 10	IOW; 15	SHA; 3	SON; 14	SLS; 12	IOW; 8	EVG; 11	CNS; 15	MER; 5	AAS; 6	PHO; 16			9th	440	
