= James Bickford =

James Bickford may refer to:

- James Bickford (bobsleigh) (1912–1989), American bobsledder
- James Bickford (racing driver) (born 1998), American stock car racing driver
