= Clayton Green (racing driver) =

American racing driver (born 1997)

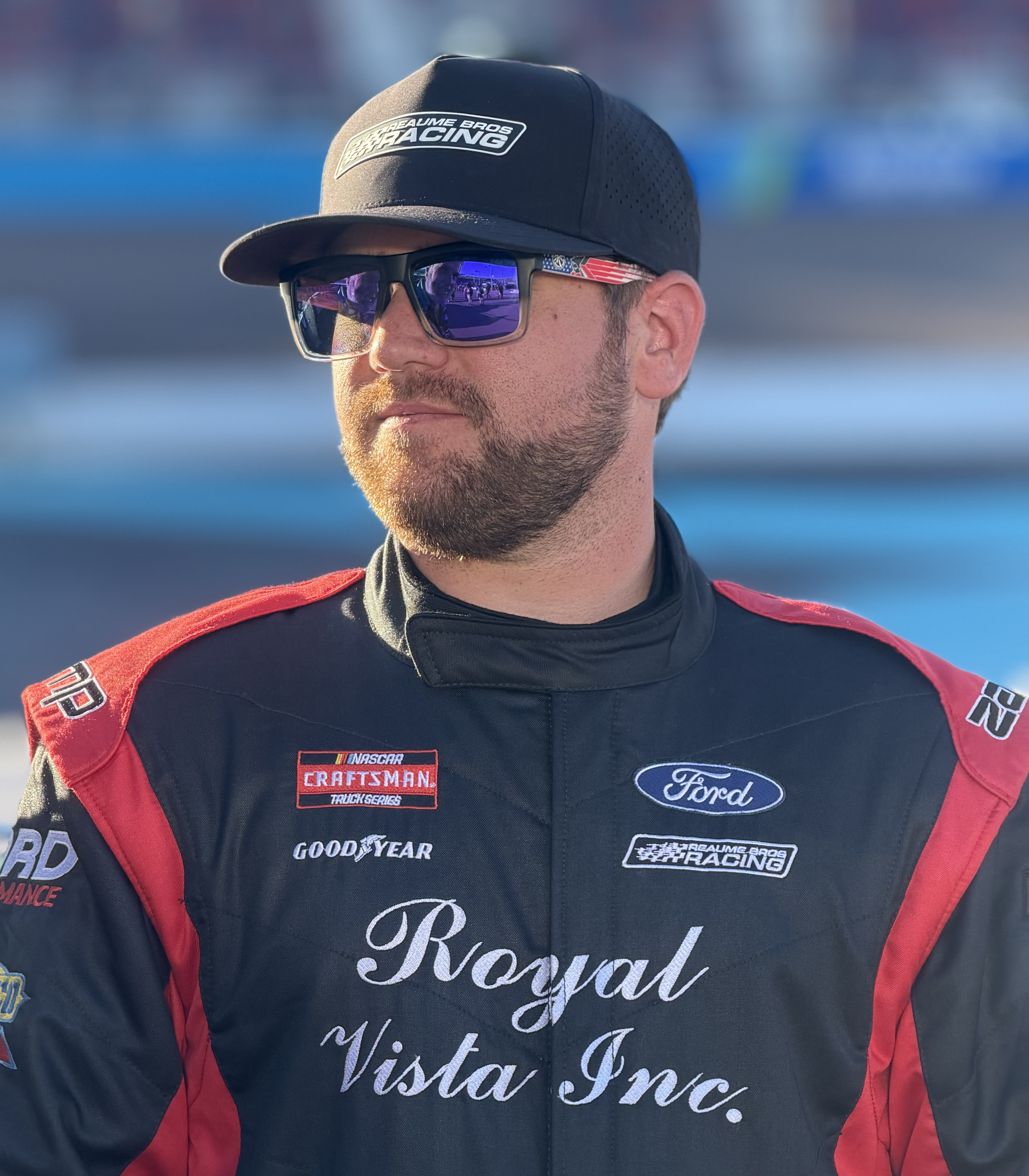
- Green at Phoenix Raceway in 2025
- Born: Clayton Hugh Everett Green; May 19, 1997 (age 29); Marble Falls, Texas, U.S.

NASCAR FedEx Freight Truck Series career
- 20 races run over 3 years
- 2026 position: 35th
- Best finish: 35th (2026)
- First race: 2024 Wright Brand 250 (North Wilkesboro)
- Last race: 2026 Craftsman 200 (Homestead)
Wins	Top tens	Poles
0	0	0

ARCA Menards Series East career
- 3 races run over 1 year
- Best finish: 39th (2016)
- First race: 2016 Jet Tools 150 (New Smyrna)
- Last race: 2016 PittLite 125 (Bristol)
Wins	Top tens	Poles
0	0	0

ARCA Menards Series West career
- 3 races run over 1 year
- Best finish: 23rd (2015)
- First race: 2015 NAPA Auto Parts Idaho 208 (Meridian)
- Last race: 2015 Casino Arizona 100 (Phoenix)
Wins	Top tens	Poles
0	1	0
- Statistics up to date as of November 6, 2026.

Clayton Hugh Everett Green (born May 19, 1997) is an American professional stock car racing driver. He currently competes part-time in the NASCAR Truck Series, driving various trucks for Team Reaume.

Born and raised in Marble Falls, Texas, Green began racing in his local state of Texas in go-karts at the age of four. He transitioned to bandolero racing and legend car racing in the following years, racing nationwide. Starting in 2015, Green made a brief stint in NASCAR-sanctioned regional touring series, beginning with the West Series in 2015 before transferring to the East Series the following year. A crash in the early parts of 2016 caused Green to pause his racing career for two years due to financial hardships. Green resumed racing in 2019, racing in local racing divisions. In 2024, Green returned to racing in NASCAR in the nationally-touring third-tier NASCAR Truck Series on a part-time basis; in the following two years, Green expanded his schedule in the Truck Series to expand approval to various styles of racetracks on NASCAR's calendar.

== Early life and family background ==
Green was born on May 19, 1997, in Marble Falls, Texas. His parents, Steven and Dana Green, are the owners of Royal Vista, Inc., a construction company. During his childhood, Green often worked for Royal Vista whenever he was not at school or racing. He was educated at Marble Falls High School, graduating in 2015.

== Racing career ==
=== Early racing career ===
Green began racing go-karts in his local state of Texas at the age of four. At the age of six, Green transitioned to bandolero cars, initially racing in the Bandit division; a division for younger bandolero drivers. In 2010, Green won the national championship race in the INEX-sanctioned Outlaw division for bandoleros; a division for older bandolero drivers. After winning the Outlaw division championship, Green transitioned to legends car racing, racing nationwide but primarily staying within the Gulf Coast. He moved up to the Pro division in legend cars in 2013.

In 2015, Green made his debut in the K&N Pro Series West (now known as the ARCA Menards West Series) in the 11th race of the season at Meridian Speedway, initially driving for team owner Dave Hanson. He was able to connect with Hanson after a failed stint with a development program that promised to let Green race in NASCAR after the owner of the development program embezzled money from the program. In his debut in the series, which Green described as a test for a potential future in NASCAR, he finished seventh; Green disputed the result as late as 2026, stating that he finished in sixth. After racing one more race with Hanson at All American Speedway, he entered the final race of the season at Phoenix under his own family team after the family purchased a vehicle from a private dealer in Arkansas to run in regional series, finishing in 19th.

For the following year, due to cheaper costs of running the series, Green announced plans to race in the regional K&N Pro Series East (now known as the ARCA Menards East Series) for his family-owned team. Green faced numerous struggles, stating that "we got our butts handed to us". After finishing below 20th in the first two races of the season, at the fourth race of the season at Bristol, Green was involved in an early crash that left his car with terminal damage. The accident left Green's only racecar "killed" and his family racing operation "financially destroyed", with Green taking a pause from racing for two years to both work in his family business and rebuild a racing operation from the crash. Green returned to motorsports in 2019, racing modified cars in various series and tracks until 2023. During 2023, Green bought a late model car from a family friend who had offered Green the vehicle to help pay for cancer treatments, beginning to race the car in late 2023.

=== Return to NASCAR ===
On May 1, 2024, Green announced plans to make his debut in the nationally-touring, third-tier NASCAR Truck Series for the Cory Roper-owned Roper Racing at the tenth round of the Truck Series season at North Wilkesboro. According to Green, he connected with Roper through his father, who often raced with Roper. In his debut attempt, Green finished in 34th, five laps down from the winner. Later in the season, he made his debut for the Josh Reaume-owned Reaume Brothers Racing (RBR; now named Team Reaume) at the penultimate race at Martinsville; he was connected with Reaume through another partner he intended to run ARCA races with.

In 2025, Green announced a part-time schedule with RBR; according to Green, his 2025 campaign was focused on getting approvals for different styles of racetracks. He made his season debut at the 12th race of the season in Nashville, finishing in 27th. He made his debut on a superspeedway at the 12th race of the season in Pocono, retiring in 30th after being involved in a wreck during the race's final stage. Green started and parked his next four attempts, including a race at Martinsville that included a practice crash due to an oil spill from Bayley Currey's truck that led to heavy rear damage and Green subsequently parking his vehicle during pace laps. At the season-finale at Phoenix, Green finished in 20th; his first top-20 in the Truck Series.

In 2026, Green again announced plans to run a part-time schedule with the now-renamed Team Reaume, continuing his approval process to expand to more styles of racetracks with a focus on intermediates. He made his debut for the season at the second race at Atlanta, a restrictor plate track, finishing in 23rd. Throughout ten attempts, Green had a best race finish of 23rd, with two retirements at Bristol and Charlotte; both due to mechanical issues.

== Motorsports career results ==
=== Stock car career summary ===
Season	Series	Team	Races	Wins	Top 5	Top 10	Points	Position
2015	NASCAR K&N Pro Series West	Dave Hanson	2	0	0	1	94	23rd
2015	NASCAR K&N Pro Series West	Clayton Green Motorsports	1	0	0	0	94	23rd
2016	NASCAR K&N Pro Series East	Clayton Green Motorsports	3	0	0	0	56	39th
2024	NASCAR Craftsman Truck Series	Roper Racing	1	0	0	0	16	60th
2024	NASCAR Craftsman Truck Series	Reaume Brothers Racing	1	0	0	0	16	60th
2025	NASCAR Craftsman Truck Series	Reaume Brothers Racing	7	0	0	0	44	40th
2026	NASCAR Craftsman Truck Series	Team Reaume	11	0	0	0	79	35th

=== NASCAR ===
(key) (Bold – Pole position awarded by qualifying time. Italics – Pole position earned by points standings or practice time. * – Most laps led. ** – All laps led.)

==== Craftsman Truck Series ====
NASCAR Craftsman Truck Series results
Year	Team	No.	Make	1	2	3	4	5	6	7	8	9	10	11	12	13	14	15	16	17	18	19	20	21	22	23	24	25	NCTC	Pts	Ref
2024	Roper Racing	04	Chevy	DAY	ATL	LVS	BRI	COA	MAR	TEX	KAN	DAR	NWS; 34	CLT	GTW	NSH	POC	IRP	RCH	MLW	BRI	KAN	TAL	HOM					60th	16	
2024	Reaume Brothers Racing	22	Ford																						MAR; 24	PHO			60th	16	
2025	Reaume Brothers Racing	2	Ford	DAY	ATL	LVS	HOM	MAR	BRI	CAR	TEX	KAN	NWS	CLT	NSH; 27	MCH					RCH; 35		BRI; 36	NHA	ROV	TAL	MAR; 35	PHO; 20	40th	44	
2025	Reaume Brothers Racing	22	Ford														POC; 30	LRP	IRP	GLN		DAR; 32							40th	44	
2026	Team Reaume	2	Ford	DAY	ATL; 23	STP	DAR; 29			TEX; 26	GLN	DOV	CLT	NSH; 29	MCH	COR	LRP												35th	79	
2026	Team Reaume	22	Ford					CAR; 29	BRI; 36									NWS; 31	IRP	RCH	NHA	BRI	KAN; 23	CLT; 36	PHO; 35	TAL	MAR	HOM; 31	35th	79	

^{*} Season still in progress
^{1} Ineligible for series points

==== K&N Pro Series East ====
NASCAR K&N Pro Series East results
Year	Team	No.	Make	1	2	3	4	5	6	7	8	9	10	11	12	13	14	NKNPSEC	Pts	Ref
2016	Clayton Green Motorsports	77	Toyota	NSM; 25	MOB; 23	GRE; Wth	BRI; 28	VIR	DOM	STA	COL	NHA	IOW	GLN	GRE	NJM	DOV	39th	56	

==== K&N Pro Series West ====
NASCAR K&N Pro Series West results
Year	Team	No.	Make	1	2	3	4	5	6	7	8	9	10	11	12	13	NKNPSWC	Pts	Ref
2015	Dave Hanson	71	Toyota	KCR	IRW	TUS	IOW	SHA	SON	SLS	IOW	EVG	CNS	MER; 7	AAS; 12		23rd	94	
2015	Clayton Green Motorsports	48	Toyota													PHO; 19	23rd	94	
