= Alex Schutte =

American racing driver

- Born: June 21, 1989 (age 37); Redding, California, U.S.

ARCA Menards Series East career
- 1 race run over 1 year
- Best finish: 50th (2016)
- First race: 2016 Bully Hill Vineyards 100 (Watkins Glen)
Wins	Top tens	Poles
0	1	0

ARCA Menards Series West career
- 15 races run over 3 years
- Best finish: 5th (2015)
- First race: 2014 Toyota / NAPA Auto Parts 150 (Roseville)
- Last race: 2016 Chevy's Fresh Mex 200 (Sonoma)
Wins	Top tens	Poles
0	11	0
- Statistics up to date as of November 20, 2024.

Alex Schutte (born June 21, 1989) is an American professional stock car racing driver who has competed in the NASCAR K&N Pro Series East and the NASCAR K&N Pro Series West.

Schutte has also previously competed in series such as the AMSOIL USAC CRA Sprint Car Series, the USAC Western States Midget Series, the Bay Cities Racing Association Midgets Series, and the Pacific Challenge Series.

== Motorsports results ==
=== NASCAR ===
(key) (Bold - Pole position awarded by qualifying time. Italics - Pole position earned by points standings or practice time. * – Most laps led.)

==== K&N Pro Series East ====
NASCAR K&N Pro Series East results
Year	Team	No.	Make	1	2	3	4	5	6	7	8	9	10	11	12	13	14	NKNPSEC	Pts	Ref
2016	Troy Cline	88	Ford	NSM	MOB	GRE	BRI	VIR	DOM	STA	COL	NHA	IOW	GLN; 10	GRE	NJM	DOV	50th	34	

==== K&N Pro Series West ====
NASCAR K&N Pro Series West results
Year	Team	No.	Make	1	2	3	4	5	6	7	8	9	10	11	12	13	14	NKNPSWC	Pts	Ref
2014	Steve Portenga Racing	21	Chevy	PHO	IRW	S99	IOW	KCR	SON	SLS	CNS	IOW	EVG	KCR	MMP	AAS; 16	PHO	74th	28	
2015	Steve Portenga Racing	21	Chevy	KCR; 10	IRW; 9	TUS; 15	IOW; 6	SHA; 9	SON; 8	SLS; 9	IOW; 4	EVG; 6	CNS; 7	MER; 8	AAS; 2*	PHO; 13		5th	468	
2016	Troy Cline	88	Ford	IRW	KCR	TUS	OSS	CNS	SON; 25	SLS	IOW	EVG	DCS	MMP	MMP	MER	AAS	58th	19	
