= 2020 General Tire 150 (Phoenix) =

Race details
- Race 2 of 20 of the 2020 ARCA Menards Series; Race 1 of 10 of the 2020 Sioux Chief Showdown
- Date: March 6, 2020
- Official name: First Annual General Tire 150
- Location: Avondale, Arizona, Phoenix Raceway
- Course: Permanent racing facility
- Course length: 1 miles (1.6 km)
- Distance: 150 laps, 150 mi (240 km)
- Scheduled distance: 150 laps, 150 mi (240 km)
- Average speed: 78.66 miles per hour (126.59 km/h)

Pole position
Driver	Ty Gibbs	Joe Gibbs Racing
- Time: 27.507

Most laps led
Driver	Ty Gibbs	Joe Gibbs Racing
- Laps: 122

Winner
No. 20	Chandler Smith	Venturini Motorsports

Television in the United States
- Network: FS1
- Announcers: David Rieff, Phil Parsons, Matt Crafton

Radio in the United States
- Radio: Motor Racing Network

The 2020 General Tire 150 was the second stock car race of the 2020 ARCA Menards Series, the first race of the 2020 Sioux Chief Showdown, and the inaugural iteration of the event. The race was held on Friday, March 6, 2020, in Avondale, Arizona at Phoenix Raceway, a 1 mile (1.6 km) permanent low-banked tri-oval race track. The race took the scheduled 150 laps to complete. Chandler Smith of Venturini Motorsports would take the final restart with two to go and hold off teammate Michael Self and a dominating Ty Gibbs to win his eighth career ARCA Menards Series win and his first of the season. To fill out the podium, Michael Self of Venturini Motorsports and Ty Gibbs of Joe Gibbs Racing would finish second and third, respectively.

== Background ==
Phoenix Raceway is a one-mile, low-banked tri-oval race track located in Avondale, Arizona. It is named after the nearby metropolitan area of Phoenix. The motorsport track opened in 1964 and currently hosts two NASCAR race weekends annually. PIR has also hosted the IndyCar Series, CART, USAC and the Rolex Sports Car Series. The raceway is currently owned and operated by International Speedway Corporation.

The raceway was originally constructed with a 2.5 mi (4.0 km) road course that ran both inside and outside of the main tri-oval. In 1991 the track was reconfigured with the current 1.51 mi (2.43 km) interior layout. PIR has an estimated grandstand seating capacity of around 67,000. Lights were installed around the track in 2004 following the addition of a second annual NASCAR race weekend.

Phoenix Raceway is home to two annual NASCAR race weekends, one of 13 facilities on the NASCAR schedule to host more than one race weekend a year. The track is both the first and last stop in the western United States, as well as the fourth and the last track on the schedule.

=== Entry list ===
#	Driver	Team	Make	Sponsor
01	Armani Williams	Fast Track Racing	Ford	Centria Autism
4	Hailie Deegan	DGR-Crosley	Ford	Toter "Built For Extremes"
4E	Chase Cabre	Rev Racing	Toyota	Eibach, Max Siegel Incorporated
6	Nick Sanchez	Rev Racing	Toyota	Universal Technical Institute, NASCAR Technical Institute
06	Tim Richmond	Wayne Peterson Racing	Toyota	Sunland Environmental Testing
10	Ryan Huff	Fast Track Racing	Toyota	Land & Coates Outdoor Power Equipment
11	Dawson Cram	Fast Track Racing	Toyota	KMI Trucking
12	Tom Berte	Fast Track Racing	Toyota	CGS Premier "Big Ideas. On Time. On Budget."
12W	Lawless Alan	Bill McAnally Racing	Toyota	AUTOParkIt
15	Drew Dollar	Venturini Motorsports	Toyota	Dollar Concrete Construction Company, Lynx Capital
16	Gio Scelzi	Bill McAnally Racing	Toyota	NAPA Auto Parts
17	Tanner Gray	DGR-Crosley	Ford	Ford Performance
17W	Zane Smith	Steve McGowan Motorsports	Chevrolet	MMI Services
18	Ty Gibbs	Joe Gibbs Racing	Toyota	Monster Energy
19	Jesse Love	Bill McAnally Racing	Toyota	NAPA Power Premium Plus
20	Chandler Smith	Venturini Motorsports	Toyota	JBL
21	Sam Mayer	GMS Racing	Chevrolet	Spencer Clark Driven Foundation
22	Christian McGhee	Chad Bryant Racing	Ford	Power Grade Inc., Millennium Reinforcing
23	Bret Holmes	Bret Holmes Racing	Toyota	Holmes II Excavating
25	Michael Self	Venturini Motorsports	Toyota	Sinclair
32	Howie DiSavino III	Win-Tron Racing	Chevrolet	Bud's Plumbing, Kees Travel
46	Thad Moffitt	DGR-Crosley	Ford	Performance Plus Motor Oil Richard Petty Signature Series
48	Brad Smith	Brad Smith Motorsports	Chevrolet	Copraya
77	Takuma Koga	Performance P-1 Motorsports	Toyota	Laundry
99	Gracie Trotter	Bill McAnally Racing	Toyota	Eneos
Official entry list

*Withdrew.

== Practice ==
The only two-hour practice session was held on March 6. Ty Gibbs of Joe Gibbs Racing would set the fastest time in the session, with a 27.037 and an average speed of 133.151 miles per hour (214.286 km/h).

Pos.	#	Driver	Team	Make	Time	Speed
1	18	Ty Gibbs	Joe Gibbs Racing	Toyota	27.037	133.151
2	25	Michael Self	Venturini Motorsports	Toyota	27.151	132.592
3	20	Chandler Smith	Venturini Motorsports	Toyota	27.462	131.090
Full practice results

== Qualifying ==
Qualifying was held on Friday, March 6 at 2:30 PM MST. Each driver was split into six groups, and each group would run four minute sessions. Ty Gibbs of Joe Gibbs Racing would win the pole, setting a lap of 27.507 and an average speed of 130.876 miles per hour (210.625 km/h).

=== Full qualifying results ===
Pos.	#	Driver	Team	Make	Time	Speed
1	18	Ty Gibbs	Joe Gibbs Racing	Toyota	27.507	130.876
2	25	Michael Self	Venturini Motorsports	Toyota	27.703	129.950
3	20	Chandler Smith	Venturini Motorsports	Toyota	27.713	129.903
4	21	Sam Mayer	GMS Racing	Chevrolet	27.874	129.153
5	46	Thad Moffitt	DGR-Crosley	Ford	28.064	128.278
6	15	Drew Dollar	Venturini Motorsports	Toyota	28.073	128.237
7	19	Jesse Love	Bill McAnally Racing	Toyota	28.121	128.018
8	17	Tanner Gray	DGR-Crosley	Ford	28.132	127.968
9	4	Hailie Deegan	DGR-Crosley	Ford	28.133	127.964
10	17W	Zane Smith	Steve McGowan Motorsports	Chevrolet	28.181	127.746
11	23	Bret Holmes	Bret Holmes Racing	Toyota	28.215	127.592
12	6	Nick Sanchez	Rev Racing	Toyota	28.233	127.510
13	99	Gracie Trotter	Bill McAnally Racing	Toyota	28.284	127.280
14	4E	Chase Cabre	Rev Racing	Toyota	28.334	127.056
15	22	Christian McGhee	Chad Bryant Racing	Ford	28.393	126.792
16	32	Howie DiSavino III	Win-Tron Racing	Chevrolet	28.395	126.783
17	16	Gio Scelzi	Bill McAnally Racing	Toyota	28.499	126.320
18	12W	Lawless Alan	Bill McAnally Racing	Toyota	28.576	125.980
19	77	Takuma Koga	Performance P-1 Motorsports	Toyota	28.980	124.224
20	11	Dawson Cram	Fast Track Racing	Toyota	29.333	122.729
21	10	Ryan Huff	Fast Track Racing	Toyota	29.695	121.233
22	01	Armani Williams	Fast Track Racing	Ford	29.697	121.224
23	06	Tim Richmond	Wayne Peterson Racing	Toyota	29.818	120.732
24	12	Tom Berte	Fast Track Racing	Toyota	30.072	119.713
Withdrew
WD	48	Brad Smith	Brad Smith Motorsports	Chevrolet	—	—
Official qualifying results

== Race results ==
Fin	St	#	Driver	Team	Make	Laps	Led	Status	Pts
1	3	20	Chandler Smith	Venturini Motorsports	Toyota	150	11	running	48
2	2	25	Michael Self	Venturini Motorsports	Toyota	150	0	running	42
3	1	18	Ty Gibbs	Joe Gibbs Racing	Toyota	150	122	running	44
4	8	17	Tanner Gray	DGR-Crosley	Ford	150	0	running	40
5	10	17W	Zane Smith	Steve McGowan Motorsports	Chevrolet	150	9	running	40
6	12	6	Nick Sanchez	Rev Racing	Toyota	150	0	running	38
7	9	4	Hailie Deegan	DGR-Crosley	Ford	150	0	running	37
8	14	4E	Chase Cabre	Rev Racing	Toyota	150	0	running	36
9	18	12W	Lawless Alan	Bill McAnally Racing	Toyota	150	0	running	35
10	17	16	Gio Scelzi	Bill McAnally Racing	Toyota	150	0	running	34
11	20	11	Dawson Cram	Fast Track Racing	Toyota	150	0	running	33
12	15	22	Christian McGhee	Chad Bryant Racing	Ford	150	0	running	32
13	19	77	Takuma Koga	Performance P-1 Motorsports	Toyota	149	0	running	31
14	6	15	Drew Dollar	Venturini Motorsports	Toyota	149	0	running	30
15	11	23	Bret Holmes	Bret Holmes Racing	Toyota	146	0	communication	29
16	7	19	Jesse Love	Bill McAnally Racing	Toyota	144	0	crash	28
17	22	01	Armani Williams	Fast Track Racing	Ford	130	0	running	27
18	5	46	Thad Moffitt	DGR-Crosley	Ford	125	0	crash	26
19	24	12	Tom Berte	Fast Track Racing	Toyota	108	0	crash	25
20	4	21	Sam Mayer	GMS Racing	Chevrolet	87	8	radiator	24
21	16	32	Howie DiSavino III	Win-Tron Racing	Chevrolet	78	0	crash	23
22	13	99	Gracie Trotter	Bill McAnally Racing	Toyota	63	0	engine	22
23	23	06	Tim Richmond	Wayne Peterson Racing	Toyota	11	0	handling	21
24	21	10	Ryan Huff	Fast Track Racing	Toyota	5	0	crash	20
Withdrew
WD		48	Brad Smith	Brad Smith Motorsports	Chevrolet				
Official race results

Previous race: 2020 Lucas Oil 200	ARCA Menards Series; 2020 season	Next race: 2020 General Tire 200
