= Brandon McReynolds =

American stock car racing driver and spotter

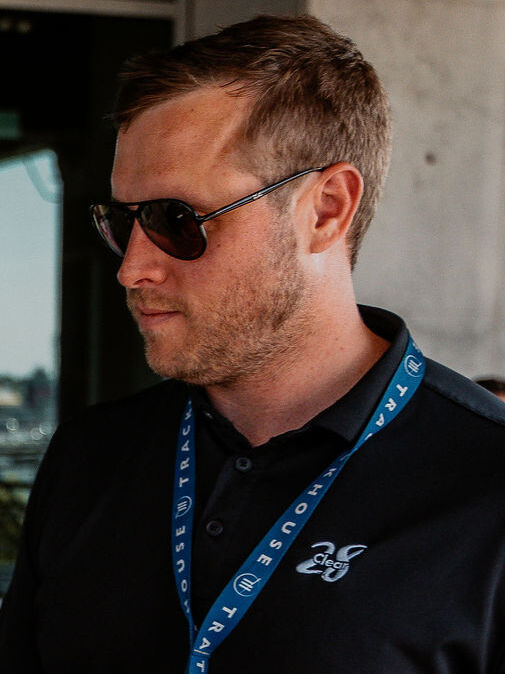
- McReynolds in 2025
- Born: Lawrence Brandon McReynolds; May 21, 1991 (age 35); Mooresville, North Carolina, U.S.

NASCAR O'Reilly Auto Parts Series career
- 3 races run over 2 years
- 2016 position: 59th
- Best finish: 59th (2016)
- First race: 2010 5-Hour Energy 250 (Gateway)
- Last race: 2016 U.S. Cellular 250 (Iowa)
Wins	Top tens	Poles
0	0	0

NASCAR FedEx Freight Truck Series career
- 1 race run over 1 year
- 2012 position: 63rd
- Best finish: 63rd (2012)
- First race: 2012 Winstar World Casino 350K (Texas)
Wins	Top tens	Poles
0	0	0

NASCAR Canada Series career
- 2018 position: 39th
- Best finish: 39th (2018)
- First race: 2018 Bumper to Bumper 300 (Riverside)
Wins	Top tens	Poles
0	1	0
- Statistics up to date as of July 1, 2025.

Lawrence Brandon McReynolds (born May 21, 1991) is an American professional stock car racing driver, and the spotter for Ross Chastain and the No. 1 Chevrolet for Trackhouse Racing in the NASCAR Cup Series. As a driver, he has competed in the NASCAR Xfinity Series for JGL Racing, and has also competed in the K&N Pro Series East and West as well as the ARCA Menards Series. He is the son of NASCAR on Fox analyst and former crew chief Larry McReynolds.

== Racing career ==
=== UARA-STARS Series ===
The one notable event from McReynolds' UARA-Stars tenure was the 2009 Bailey's 300 at Martinsville Speedway. Jake Crum won the race, with McReynolds finishing second. McReynolds and Crum disagreed on tactics used throughout the race which culminated in both getting in to each other on the backstretch after the race. McReynolds captured eight victories during his time on the tour, which was from 2008 to 2010.

=== K&N Pro Series ===
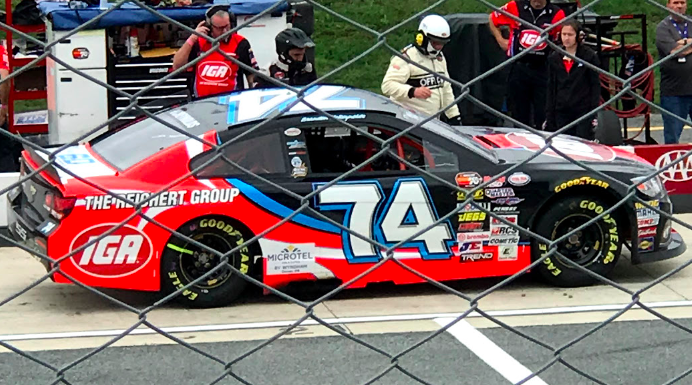
McReynolds' NASCAR K&N Pro Series East car in 2018

McReynolds made a combined total of 44 starts, 29 in the West, 15 in the East from 2011 to 2015. He scored a best finish of third twice in the East, and won two races in the West series in 2015. Both wins came from the pole at Iowa.

In November 2017, it was announced that McReynolds will run a partial K&N Pro Series East schedule in 2018 with longtime NASCAR Modified owners John Visconti and Marie Visconti. Visconti Motorsports had an alliance with Tommy Baldwin Racing, whom McReynolds had previously run with. The team raced whenever McReynolds was not helping with Noah Gragson's team in the Camping World Truck Series. McReynolds captured his first K&N Pro Series East win and Visconti Motorsports first win at New Hampshire in September, beating Derek Kraus and Riley Herbst on a late restart.

=== ARCA Racing Series ===
McReynolds logged seven starts from 2010 to 2012, emerging victorious once, at Talladega Superspeedway in 2012, passing Matt Lofton on the final circuit. He returned to the series in 2019 for a partial superspeedway slate with KBR Development.

=== Camping World Truck Series ===
In his one start in the series, McReynolds finished 18th at Texas Motor Speedway in 2012.

=== Xfinity Series ===
McReynolds made his Xfinity (then Nationwide) debut in 2010, finishing 19th in Eddie Smith's Dodge. It would be another six years before his next start, a 23rd at Talladega for JGL Racing. His dad Larry was in the booth for FOX broadcasting the race. Later in 2016, McReynolds returned to the JGL No. 24 machine, crashing in the U.S. Cellular 250. McReynolds did not return to NASCAR competition in 2017.

=== Pinty's Series ===
In his one start in the series, McReynolds finished ninth at Riverside International Speedway in 2018.

=== Spotting ===
In 2017, McReynolds took on the role of spotter and driver coach to Noah Gragson's Kyle Busch Motorsports team in the Camping World Truck Series. After he was unable to find a ride in any NASCAR series in 2020, McReynolds returned to spotting in 2021, replacing Tony Raines (another former driver-turned spotter) as the spotter of the No. 1 Trackhouse Racing Team Chevy in the NASCAR Cup Series, which will be driven by Ross Chastain.

== Post-racing career ==
=== Broadcasting ===
McReynolds has dipped his toe in to broadcasting like his father, serving as a guest analyst for a K&N Pro Series West race on NBCSN in 2017.

=== Pre-founding of Clear 28 ===
After concluding his driving tenure with Bill McAnally Racing in the K&N Pro Series West at the end of 2015, McReynolds transitioned into a career focused on driver development and motorsports management. Beginning in 2016, McReynolds joined Jefferson Pitts Racing to work closely with then-rookie driver Noah Gragson. His responsibilities included spotting for Gragson in the K&N Pro Series West and East, providing driver coaching, guiding Gragson's understanding of NASCAR’s competitive and business landscapes, facilitating brand partnerships, and overseeing training programs.

From 2016 through 2019, McReynolds directly supported Gragson's career progression, playing an integral role in Gragson’s advancement to premier NASCAR teams such as Kyle Busch Motorsports (2017–2018) and JR Motorsports (2019–2022). He was also involved in securing and maintaining partnerships with notable sponsors including Safelite, Superior Essex, Bass Pro Shops, PUBG Mobile, and Plan B Sales.

In 2019, McReynolds was appointed managing partner at Truex Management Group, a position he held until 2021. Seeking new challenges and inspired by mentors Jeff Clark and Todd English, McReynolds founded Clear 28, a motorsports marketing and driver management agency, in January 2022. Clear 28 initially represented drivers Gragson and Cole Custer, both former teammates and competitors of McReynolds. The agency emphasizes strategic career placement, brand partnership development, and comprehensive driver mentorship.

=== Clear 28Agency ===
In addition to his spotting duties, McReynolds co-founded Clear 28 Agency, where he serves as Managing Partner. The agency focuses on new business and athlete marketing partnerships, as well as developing young drivers in NASCAR. Clients have included drivers such as Noah Gragson, Sam Mayer, and Brenden Queen.

Through these roles, McReynolds continues to contribute to the NASCAR community, leveraging his experience to support and develop current and future talent.

== Motorsports career results ==
=== NASCAR ===
(key) (Bold – Pole position awarded by qualifying time. Italics – Pole position earned by points standings or practice time. * – Most laps led.)

==== Xfinity Series ====
NASCAR Xfinity Series results
Year	Team	No.	Make	1	2	3	4	5	6	7	8	9	10	11	12	13	14	15	16	17	18	19	20	21	22	23	24	25	26	27	28	29	30	31	32	33	34	35	NXSC	Pts	Ref
2010	Smith-Ganassi Racing	42	Dodge	DAY	CAL	LVS	BRI	NSH	PHO	TEX	TAL	RCH	DAR	DOV	CLT	NSH	KEN	ROA	NHA	DAY	CHI	GTY	IRP	IOW	GLN	MCH	BRI	CGV	ATL	RCH	DOV	KAN	CAL	CLT	GTY; 19	TEX	PHO	HOM	112th	106	
2016	JGL Racing	24	Toyota	DAY	ATL	LVS	PHO	CAL	TEX	BRI	RCH	TAL; 24	DOV	CLT	POC	MCH	IOW	DAY	KEN	NHA	IND	IOW; 32	GLN	MOH	BRI	ROA	DAR	RCH	CHI	KEN	DOV	CLT	KAN	TEX	PHO	HOM			59th	27	

==== Camping World Truck Series ====
NASCAR Camping World Truck Series results
Year	Team	No.	Make	1	2	3	4	5	6	7	8	9	10	11	12	13	14	15	16	17	18	19	20	21	22	NCWTC	Pts	Ref
2012	Turner Motorsports	4	Chevy	DAY	MAR	CAR	KAN	CLT	DOV	TEX	KEN	IOW	CHI	POC	MCH	BRI	ATL	IOW	KEN	LVS	TAL	MAR	TEX; 18	PHO	HOM	63rd	63	

==== K&N Pro Series East ====
NASCAR K&N Pro Series East results
Year	Team	No.	Make	1	2	3	4	5	6	7	8	9	10	11	12	13	14	15	16	NKNPSEC	Pts	Ref
2011	Spraker Racing Enterprises	37	Chevy	GRE; 8	SBO	RCH; 16	IOW	BGS	JFC	LGY	NHA; 21									25th	827	
2011	Blanton Motorsports	42	Dodge									COL; 24	GRE; 20							25th	827	
2011	Blanton Motorsports	42	Toyota											NHA; 10	DOV; 8					25th	827	
2012	Turner Motorsports	28	Chevy	BRI	GRE	RCH	IOW	BGS	JFC	LGY	CNB	COL	IOW	NHA	DOV; 3	GRE	CAR			76th	17	
2013	Spraker Racing Enterprises	37	Chevy	BRI	GRE; 9	FIF	RCH	BGS												24th	134	
2013	McReynolds Incorporated	28	Chevy						IOW; 22	LGY	COL	IOW; 10	VIR	GRE	NHA	DOV; 4	RAL			24th	134	
2014	Bill McAnally Racing	16	Toyota	NSM; 14	DAY; 3	BRI	GRE	RCH	IOW	BGS	FIF	LGY	NHA	COL	IOW	GLN	VIR	GRE	DOV	37th	71	
2015	Hattori Racing Enterprises	1	Toyota	NSM	GRE	BRI	IOW	BGS	LGY	COL	NHA	IOW	GLN	MOT	VIR	RCH	DOV; 22			60th	22	
2016	Tommy Baldwin Racing	21	Chevy	NSM	MOB	GRE	BRI	VIR	DOM	STA	COL	NHA; 29	IOW	GLN	GRE; 2	NJM	DOV; 19			34th	82	
2018	Visconti Motorsports	74	Chevy	NSM; 10	BRI; 5	LGY	SBO; 14	SBO	MEM	NJM	THO; 7	NHA; 6	IOW	GLN	GTW	NHA; 1*	DOV; 2			11th	295	
2019	Visconti Motorsports	74	Chevy	NSM; 3	BRI; 3	SBO	SBO	MEM	NHA; 17	IOW	GLN	BRI; 11	GTW	NHA	DOV; 9					12th	178	

==== K&N Pro Series West ====
NASCAR K&N Pro Series West results
Year	Team	No.	Make	1	2	3	4	5	6	7	8	9	10	11	12	13	14	15	NKNPSWC	Pts	Ref
2013	Bill McAnally Racing	20	Toyota	PHO; 9	S99	BIR	IOW	L44	SON	CNS	IOW	EVG	SPO	MMP	SMP	AAS	KCR	PHO; 5	36th	74	
2014	Bill McAnally Racing	16	Toyota	PHO; 8	**IRW**; 4	S99; 4	IOW; 14	KCR; 4	SON; 5	SLS; 3	CNS; 4	IOW; 3	**EVG**; 2	KCR; 2	MMP; 5	AAS; 3	PHO; 20		4th	538	
2015	Bill McAnally Racing	16	Toyota	KCR; 27	IRW; 12	TUS; 8	**IOW**; 1	SHA; 7	SON; 19	SLS; 8	**IOW**; 1*	EVG; 12	CNS; 5	MER; 2	AAS; 24	PHO; 3			7th	455	

==== Pinty's Series ====
NASCAR Pinty's Series results
Year	Team	No.	Make	1	2	3	4	5	6	7	8	9	10	11	12	13	Rank	Pts	Ref
2018	DJK Racing	28	Dodge	MSP	JUK	ACD	TOR	SAS	SAS	EIR	CTR	RIS; 9	MSP	ASE	NHA	JUK	39th	35	

^{*} Season still in progress
^{1} Ineligible for series points

=== ARCA Menards Series ===
(key) (Bold – Pole position awarded by qualifying time. Italics – Pole position earned by points standings or practice time. * – Most laps led.)

ARCA Menards Series results
Year	Team	No.	Make	1	2	3	4	5	6	7	8	9	10	11	12	13	14	15	16	17	18	19	20	AMSC	Pts	Ref
2010	Eddie Sharp Racing	6	Toyota	DAY	PBE	SLM; 26	TEX	TAL; 23	TOL	POC	MCH	IOW	MFD	POC; 10	BLN	NJE	ISF	CHI	DSF	TOL	SLM	KAN		45th	520	
2010	RBR Enterprises	92	Chevy																				CAR; 21	45th	520	
2011	Turner Motorsports	4	Chevy	DAY	TAL; 25	SLM	TOL	NJE	CHI	POC	MCH	WIN	BLN	IOW	IRP	POC	ISF	MAD	DSF	SLM	KAN	TOL		139th	105	
2012	Turner Motorsports	4	Chevy	DAY; 11	MOB	SLM																		67th	315	
2012	Turner Motorsports	32	Chevy				TAL; 1	TOL	ELK	POC	MCH	WIN	NJE	IOW	CHI	IRP	POC	BLN	ISF	MAD	SLM	DSF	KAN	67th	315	
2019	KBR Development	28	Toyota	DAY; 25	FIF	SLM																		31st	530	
2019	KBR Development	28	Chevy				TAL; 19	NSH	TOL	CLT; 20	POC	MCH; 14	MAD	GTW	CHI	ELK	IOW	POC	ISF	DSF	SLM	IRP	KAN	31st	530	
