= Christian McGhee =

American racing driver

- Born: July 30, 1998 (age 28); Claremont, California, U.S.

ARCA Menards Series career
- 1 race run over 1 year
- Best finish: 65th (2020)
- First race: 2020 General Tire 150 (Phoenix)
Wins	Top tens	Poles
0	0	0

ARCA Menards Series West career
- 2 races run over 1 year
- Best finish: 30th (2015)
- First race: 2015 NAPA Auto Parts 150 (Bakersfield)
- Last race: 2015 King Taco Catering / NAPA Auto Parts 150 (Irwindale)
Wins	Top tens	Poles
0	1	0
- Statistics up to date as of January 31, 2025.

Christian McGhee (born July 30, 1998) is an American professional stock car racing driver who has competed in the ARCA Menards Series and the NASCAR K&N Pro Series West.

McGhee has also previously competed in the SRL Spears Southwest Tour Series, the Lucas Oil Modified Series, the SRL Legends Tour, and the NASCAR Advance Auto Parts Weekly Series.

== Motorsports results ==
=== NASCAR ===
(key) (Bold - Pole position awarded by qualifying time. Italics - Pole position earned by points standings or practice time. * – Most laps led.)

==== K&N Pro Series West ====
NASCAR K&N Pro Series West results
Year	Team	No.	Make	1	2	3	4	5	6	7	8	9	10	11	12	13	NKNPSWC	Pts	Ref
2015	Kirby Parke	06	Ford	KCR; 9	IRW; 13	TUS	IOW	SHA	SON	SLS	IOW	EVG	CNS	MER	AAS		30th	79	
2015	Dave Hanson	71	Toyota													PHO; DNQ	30th	79	

=== ARCA Menards Series ===
(key) (Bold – Pole position awarded by qualifying time. Italics – Pole position earned by points standings or practice time. * – Most laps led.)

ARCA Menards Series results
Year	Team	No.	Make	1	2	3	4	5	6	7	8	9	10	11	12	13	14	15	16	17	18	19	20	AMSC	Pts	Ref
2020	Chad Bryant Racing	22	Ford	DAY	PHO; 12	TAL	POC	IRP	KEN	IOW	KAN	TOL	TOL	MCH	DRC	GTW	I44	TOL	BRI	WIN	MEM	ISF	KAN	65th	32	
