= 2024 Wright Brand 250 =

10th race of the 2024 NASCAR Craftsman Truck Series

Race details
- Race 10 of 23 of the 2024 NASCAR Craftsman Truck Series
- Date: May 18–19, 2024
- Official name: 2nd Annual Wright Brand 250
- Location: North Wilkesboro Speedway in North Wilkesboro, North Carolina
- Course: Permanent racing facility
- Course length: 0.625 miles (1.006 km)
- Distance: 250 laps, 156 mi (251 km)
- Scheduled distance: 250 laps, 156 mi (251 km)
- Average speed: 82.940 mph (133.479 km/h)

Pole position
Driver	Christian Eckes	McAnally-Hilgemann Racing
- Grid positions set by competition-based formula

Most laps led
Driver	Corey Heim	Tricon Garage
- Laps: 66

Winner
No. 11	Corey Heim	Tricon Garage

Television in the United States
- Network: FS1
- Announcers: Adam Alexander, Phil Parsons, and Michael Waltrip

Radio in the United States
- Radio: MRN

The 2024 Wright Brand 250 was the 10th stock car race of the 2024 NASCAR Craftsman Truck Series, and the 2nd iteration of the event. The race was originally scheduled to be held on Saturday, May 18, 2024, but after the first stage, the race would be postponed until Sunday, May 19, due to severe rain and flooding in the area. The race will be held in North Wilkesboro, North Carolina at North Wilkesboro Speedway, a 0.625 miles (1.006 km) permanent asphalt oval shaped short track. The race took the scheduled 250 laps to complete. Corey Heim, driving for Tricon Garage, would put on a dominating performance in the final stages of the race, leading a race-high 66 laps and cruising to victory for his eight career NASCAR Craftsman Truck Series win, and his third of the season. Christian Eckes, who started on the pole, led 62 laps of the race before falling back and finishing sixth. To fill out the podium, Grant Enfinger, driving for CR7 Motorsports, and Layne Riggs, driving for Front Row Motorsports, would finish 2nd and 3rd, respectively.

== Report ==
=== Background ===
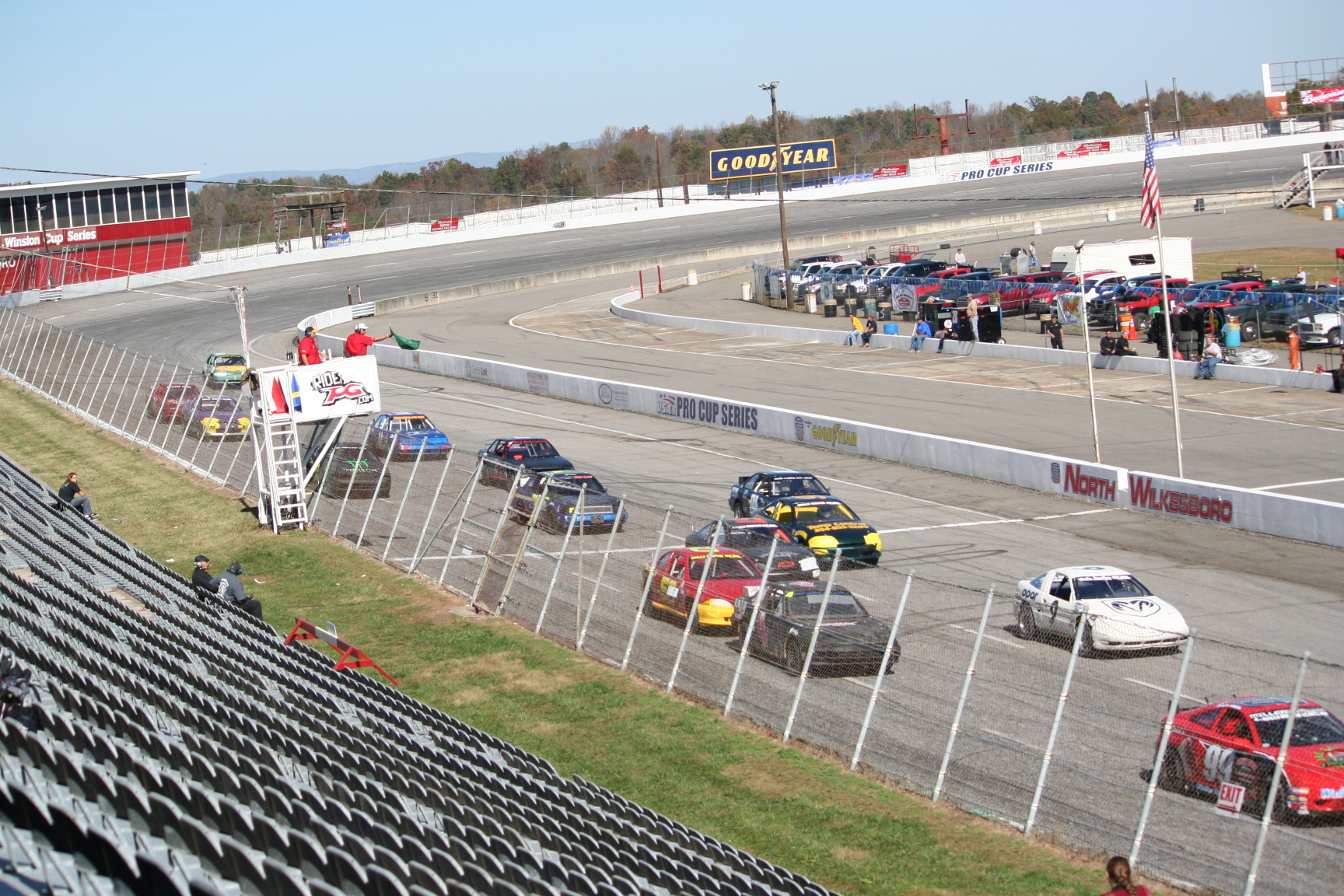
North Wilkesboro Speedway, the circuit where the race was held.

North Wilkesboro Speedway is a 0.625 miles (1.006 km) paved oval short track in North Wilkesboro, North Carolina. The track has hosted a variety of racing events since its inaugural season of racing in 1947; primarily races sanctioned by NASCAR. It has been owned by Speedway Motorsports, LLC (SMI) since 2007 with Ronald Queen serving as director of operations. North Wilkesboro Speedway is served by U.S. Route 421.

The track has a capacity of 25,000 as of 2023, down from its peak of 60,000 in 1996. NWS retains a vintage aesthetic from the 1990s as part of an effort to preserve the historical value of the track. As a result, the facility retains some of its original buildings built before the track's first closure in 1996, including buildings featuring Winston Cigarettes sponsorship and suites built in the 1980s. Developers in recent years have also added other amenities as part of a revival effort that started in 2022.

=== Entry list ===
- (R) denotes rookie driver.
- (i) denotes driver who is ineligible for series driver points.

#	Driver	Team	Make
1	Brenden Queen	Tricon Garage	Toyota
02	Mason Massey	Young's Motorsports	Chevrolet
2	Nick Sanchez	Rev Racing	Chevrolet
04	Clayton Green	Roper Racing	Chevrolet
5	Dean Thompson	Tricon Garage	Toyota
7	Sammy Smith (i)	Spire Motorsports	Chevrolet
9	Grant Enfinger	CR7 Motorsports	Chevrolet
11	Corey Heim	Tricon Garage	Toyota
13	Jake Garcia	ThorSport Racing	Ford
14	Trey Hutchens	Trey Hutchens Racing	Chevrolet
15	Tanner Gray	Tricon Garage	Toyota
16	Aric Almirola (i)	Hattori Racing Enterprises	Toyota
17	Taylor Gray	Tricon Garage	Toyota
18	Tyler Ankrum	McAnally-Hilgemann Racing	Chevrolet
19	Christian Eckes	McAnally-Hilgemann Racing	Chevrolet
22	Josh Reaume	Reaume Brothers Racing	Ford
25	Ty Dillon	Rackley WAR	Chevrolet
26	Dawson Sutton	Rackley WAR	Chevrolet
32	Bret Holmes	Bret Holmes Racing	Chevrolet
33	Lawless Alan	Reaume Brothers Racing	Ford
38	Layne Riggs (R)	Front Row Motorsports	Ford
41	Bayley Currey	Niece Motorsports	Chevrolet
42	Matt Mills	Niece Motorsports	Chevrolet
43	Daniel Dye	McAnally-Hilgemann Racing	Chevrolet
45	Ross Chastain (i)	Niece Motorsports	Chevrolet
46	Thad Moffitt (R)	Faction46	Chevrolet
52	Stewart Friesen	Halmar Friesen Racing	Toyota
56	Timmy Hill	Hill Motorsports	Toyota
66	Conner Jones (R)	ThorSport Racing	Ford
71	Rajah Caruth	Spire Motorsports	Chevrolet
75	Stefan Parsons	Henderson Motorsports	Chevrolet
76	Spencer Boyd	Freedom Racing Enterprises	Chevrolet
77	Chase Purdy	Spire Motorsports	Chevrolet
88	Matt Crafton	ThorSport Racing	Ford
90	Justin Carroll	TC Motorsports	Toyota
91	Jack Wood	McAnally-Hilgemann Racing	Chevrolet
98	Ty Majeski	ThorSport Racing	Ford
99	Ben Rhodes	ThorSport Racing	Ford
Official entry list

== Practice ==
The first and only practice was held on Friday, May 17, at 3:05 PM EST, and would last for 50 minutes. Brenden Queen, driving for Tricon Garage, would set the fastest time in the session, with a lap of 17.911, and a speed of 125.621 mph (202.167 km/h).

Pos.	#	Driver	Team	Make	Time	Speed
1	1	Brenden Queen	Tricon Garage	Toyota	17.911	125.621
2	11	Corey Heim	Tricon Garage	Toyota	17.950	125.348
3	15	Tanner Gray	Tricon Garage	Toyota	18.012	124.917
Full practice results

== Starting lineup ==
Qualifying was originally scheduled to be held on Saturday, May 18, at 9:35 AM EST, but was cancelled due to inclement weather. The starting lineup would be determined per the NASCAR rule book. As a result, Christian Eckes, driving for McAnally-Hilgemann Racing, would start on the pole.

Aric Almirola was the only driver who failed to qualify.

=== Starting lineup ===
Pos.	#	Driver	Team	Make
1	19	Christian Eckes	McAnally-Hilgemann Racing	Chevrolet
2	2	Nick Sanchez	Rev Racing	Chevrolet
3	45	Ross Chastain (i)	Niece Motorsports	Chevrolet
4	98	Ty Majeski	ThorSport Racing	Ford
5	17	Taylor Gray	Tricon Garage	Toyota
6	99	Ben Rhodes	ThorSport Racing	Ford
7	77	Chase Purdy	Spire Motorsports	Chevrolet
8	15	Tanner Gray	Tricon Garage	Toyota
9	9	Grant Enfinger	CR7 Motorsports	Chevrolet
10	25	Ty Dillon	Rackley WAR	Chevrolet
11	52	Stewart Friesen	Halmar Friesen Racing	Toyota
12	11	Corey Heim	Tricon Garage	Toyota
13	56	Timmy Hill	Hill Motorsports	Toyota
14	13	Jake Garcia	ThorSport Racing	Ford
15	42	Matt Mills	Niece Motorsports	Chevrolet
16	33	Lawless Alan	Reaume Brothers Racing	Ford
17	91	Jack Wood	McAnally-Hilgemann Racing	Chevrolet
18	43	Daniel Dye	McAnally-Hilgemann Racing	Chevrolet
19	41	Bayley Currey	Niece Motorsports	Chevrolet
20	32	Bret Holmes	Bret Holmes Racing	Chevrolet
21	18	Tyler Ankrum	McAnally-Hilgemann Racing	Chevrolet
22	02	Mason Massey	Young's Motorsports	Chevrolet
23	38	Layne Riggs (R)	Front Row Motorsports	Ford
24	71	Rajah Caruth	Spire Motorsports	Chevrolet
25	88	Matt Crafton	ThorSport Racing	Ford
26	1	Brenden Queen	Tricon Garage	Toyota
27	76	Spencer Boyd	Freedom Racing Enterprises	Chevrolet
28	5	Dean Thompson	Tricon Garage	Toyota
29	46	Thad Moffitt (R)	Faction46	Chevrolet
30	66	Conner Jones (R)	ThorSport Racing	Ford
31	7	Sammy Smith (i)	Spire Motorsports	Chevrolet
32	22	Josh Reaume	Reaume Brothers Racing	Ford
33	75	Stefan Parsons	Henderson Motorsports	Chevrolet
34	04	Clayton Green	Roper Racing	Chevrolet
35	14	Trey Hutchens	Trey Hutchens Racing	Chevrolet
36	26	Dawson Sutton	Rackley WAR	Chevrolet
Failed to qualify
37	16	Aric Almirola (i)	Hattori Racing Enterprises	Toyota
Withdrew
38	90	Justin Carroll	TC Motorsports	Toyota
Official qualifying results
Official starting lineup

== Race results ==
Stage 1 Laps: 70

Pos.	#	Driver	Team	Make	Pts
1	98	Ty Majeski	ThorSport Racing	Ford	10
2	99	Ben Rhodes	ThorSport Racing	Ford	9
3	71	Rajah Caruth	Spire Motorsports	Chevrolet	8
4	17	Taylor Gray	Tricon Garage	Toyota	7
5	11	Corey Heim	Tricon Garage	Toyota	6
6	25	Ty Dillon	Rackley WAR	Chevrolet	5
7	19	Christian Eckes	McAnally-Hilgemann Racing	Chevrolet	4
8	15	Tanner Gray	Tricon Garage	Toyota	3
9	91	Jack Wood	McAnally-Hilgemann Racing	Chevrolet	2
10	18	Tyler Ankrum	McAnally-Hilgemann Racing	Chevrolet	1

Stage 2 Laps: 70

Pos.	#	Driver	Team	Make	Pts
1	18	Tyler Ankrum	McAnally-Hilgemann Racing	Chevrolet	10
2	13	Jake Garcia	ThorSport Racing	Ford	9
3	52	Stewart Friesen	Halmar Friesen Racing	Toyota	8
4	91	Jack Wood	McAnally-Hilgemann Racing	Chevrolet	7
5	38	Layne Riggs (R)	Front Row Motorsports	Ford	6
6	99	Ben Rhodes	ThorSport Racing	Ford	5
7	19	Christian Eckes	McAnally-Hilgemann Racing	Chevrolet	4
8	11	Corey Heim	Tricon Garage	Toyota	3
9	43	Daniel Dye	McAnally-Hilgemann Racing	Chevrolet	2
10	9	Grant Enfinger	CR7 Motorsports	Chevrolet	1

Stage 3 Laps: 110

Pos.	St	#	Driver	Team	Make	Laps	Led	Status	Pts
1	12	11	Corey Heim	Tricon Garage	Toyota	250	66	Running	49
2	9	9	Grant Enfinger	CR7 Motorsports	Chevrolet	250	0	Running	36
3	23	38	Layne Riggs (R)	Front Row Motorsports	Ford	250	0	Running	40
4	26	1	Brenden Queen	Tricon Garage	Toyota	250	0	Running	33
5	31	7	Sammy Smith (i)	Spire Motorsports	Chevrolet	250	0	Running	0
6	1	19	Christian Eckes	McAnally-Hilgemann Racing	Chevrolet	250	62	Running	39
7	2	2	Nick Sanchez	Rev Racing	Chevrolet	250	0	Running	30
8	21	18	Tyler Ankrum	McAnally-Hilgemann Racing	Chevrolet	250	26	Running	40
9	18	43	Daniel Dye	McAnally-Hilgemann Racing	Chevrolet	250	0	Running	30
10	11	52	Stewart Friesen	Halmar Friesen Racing	Toyota	250	0	Running	35
11	4	98	Ty Majaski	ThorSport Racing	Ford	250	50	Running	36
12	17	91	Jack Wood	McAnally-Hilgemann Racing	Chevrolet	250	0	Running	34
13	5	17	Taylor Gray	Tricon Garage	Toyota	250	0	Running	31
14	24	71	Rajah Caruth	Spire Motorsports	Chevrolet	250	6	Running	31
15	3	45	Ross Chastain (i)	Niece Motorsports	Chevrolet	250	0	Running	0
16	8	15	Tanner Gray	Tricon Garage	Toyota	250	0	Running	24
17	33	75	Stefan Parsons	Henderson Motorsports	Chevrolet	250	0	Running	20
18	15	42	Matt Mills	Niece Motorsports	Chevrolet	250	0	Running	19
19	19	41	Bayley Currey	Niece Motorsports	Chevrolet	250	0	Running	18
20	25	88	Matt Crafton	ThorSport Racing	Ford	250	0	Running	17
21	14	13	Jake Garcia	ThorSport Racing	Ford	250	40	Running	25
22	6	99	Ben Rhodes	ThorSport Racing	Ford	250	0	Running	29
23	22	02	Mason Massey	Young's Motorsports	Chevrolet	250	0	Running	14
24	7	77	Chase Purdy	Spire Motorsports	Chevrolet	250	0	Running	13
25	10	25	Ty Dillon	Rackley WAR	Chevrolet	250	0	Running	17
26	13	56	Timmy Hill	Hill Motorsports	Toyota	250	0	Running	11
27	28	5	Dean Thompson	Tricon Garage	Toyota	249	0	Running	10
28	36	26	Dawson Sutton	Rackley WAR	Chevrolet	248	0	Running	9
29	20	32	Bret Holmes	Bret Holmes Racing	Chevrolet	247	0	Running	8
30	16	33	Lawless Alan	Reaume Brothers Racing	Ford	246	0	Running	7
31	29	46	Thad Moffitt (R)	Faction46	Chevrolet	245	0	Running	6
32	27	76	Spencer Boyd	Freedom Racing Enterprises	Chevrolet	245	0	Running	5
33	32	22	Josh Reaume	Reaume Brothers Racing	Ford	245	0	Running	4
34	34	04	Clayton Green	Roper Racing	Chevrolet	245	0	Running	3
35	30	66	Conner Jones (R)	ThorSport Racing	Ford	179	0	Accident	2
36	35	14	Trey Hutchens	Trey Hutchens Racing	Chevrolet	128	0	Transmission	1
Official race results

== Standings after the race ==
Drivers' Championship standings

	Pos	Driver	Points
	1	Christian Eckes	426
	2	Corey Heim	422 (-4)
1	3	Ty Majeski	362 (–64)
1	4	Nick Sanchez	360 (–66)
	5	Taylor Gray	328 (–98)
1	6	Tyler Ankrum	315 (–111)
1	7	Rajah Caruth	307 (–119)
3	8	Grant Enfinger	256 (–170)
1	9	Ben Rhodes	254 (–172)
1	10	Tanner Gray	252 (–174)
Official driver's standings

Manufacturers' Championship standings

Pos	Manufacturer	Points
1	Chevrolet	383
2	Toyota	349 (-34)
3	Ford	318 (–65)

- Note: Only the first 10 positions are included for the driver standings.

Previous race: 2024 Buckle Up South Carolina 200	NASCAR Craftsman Truck Series; 2024 season	Next race: 2024 North Carolina Education Lottery 200
