= 2015 NASCAR K&N Pro Series West =

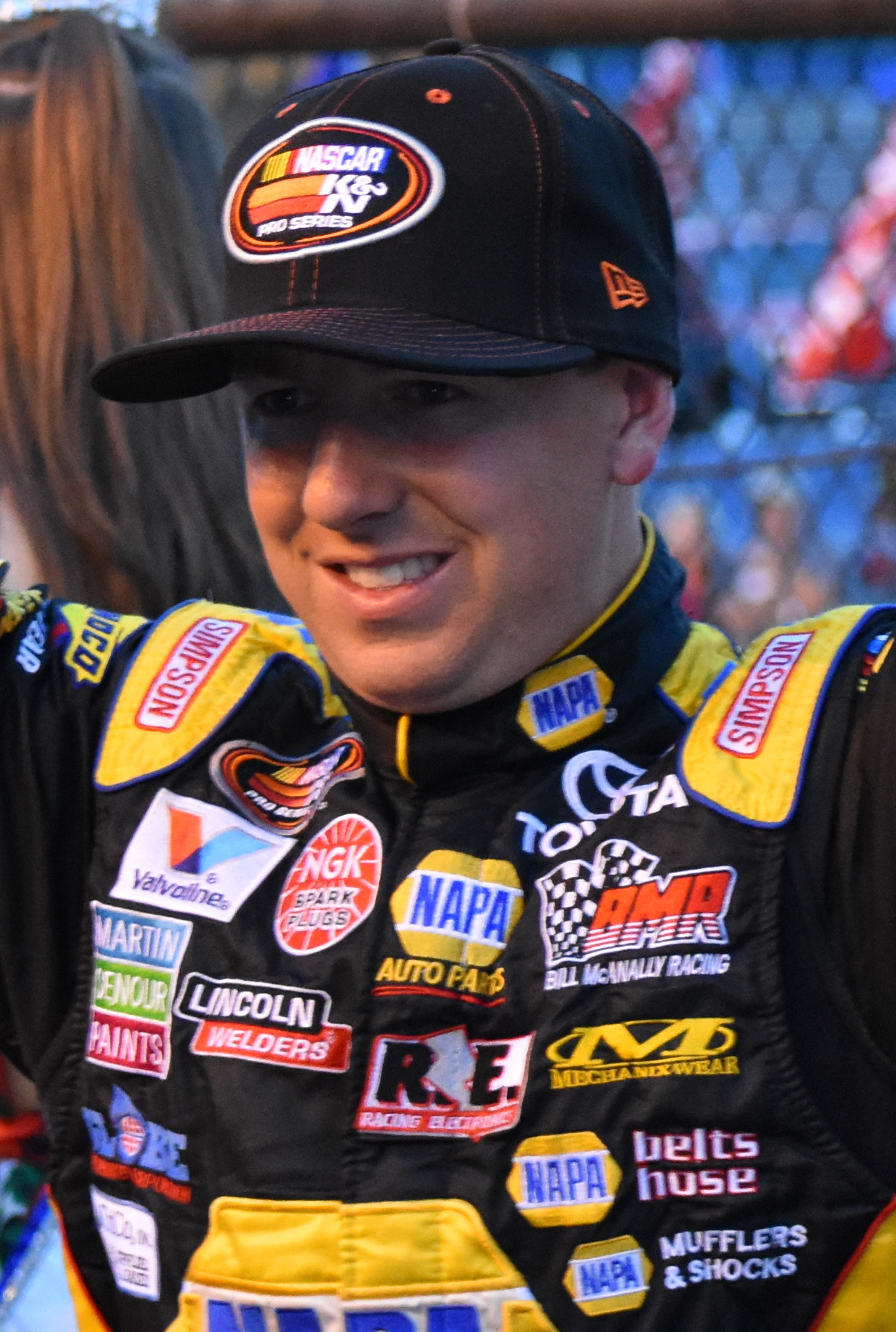
Chris Eggleston, the 2015 K&N Pro Series West champion.

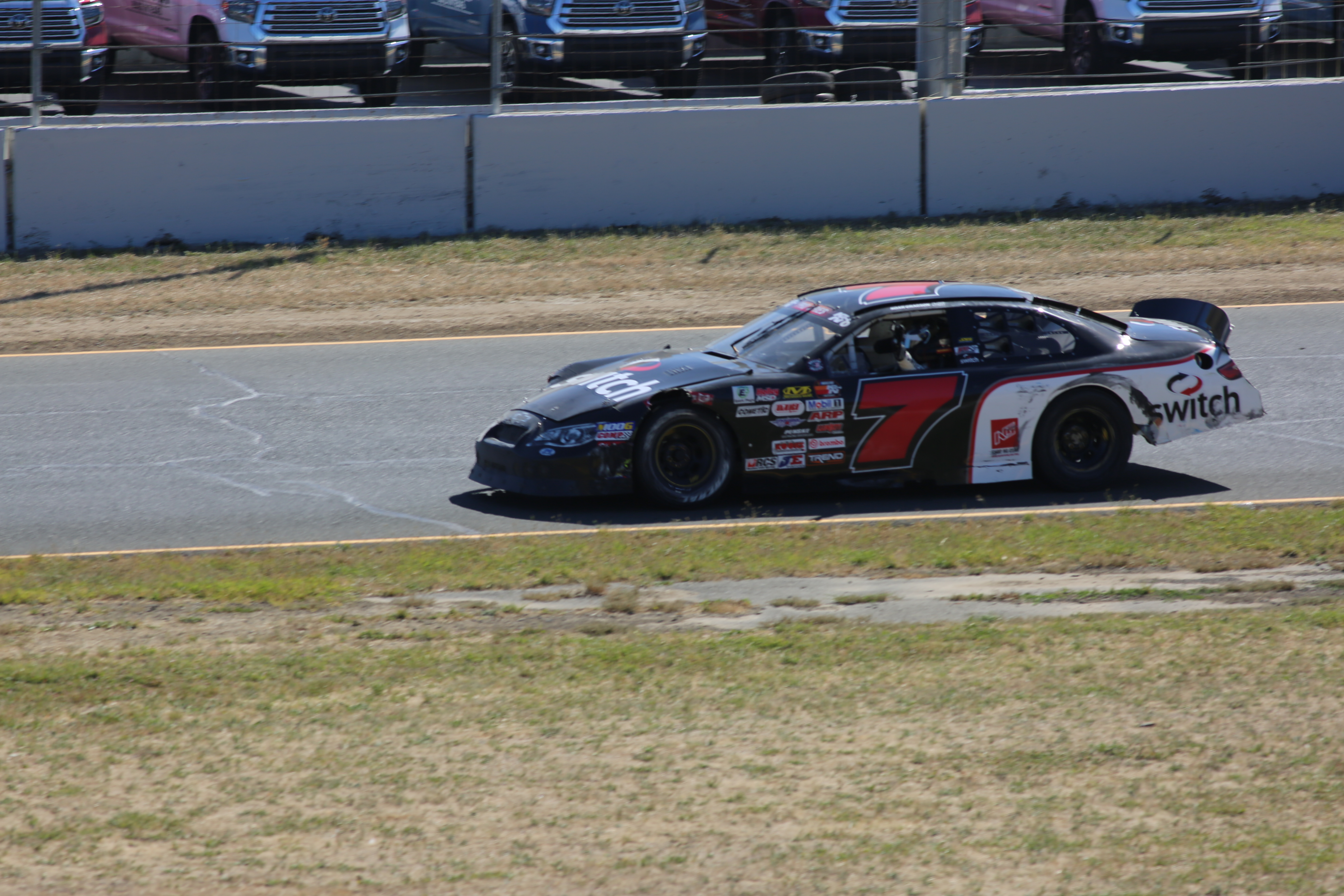
Noah Gragson, driving the No. 7 car for Jefferson Pitts Racing, finished second behind Eggleston in the championship by just 7 points.

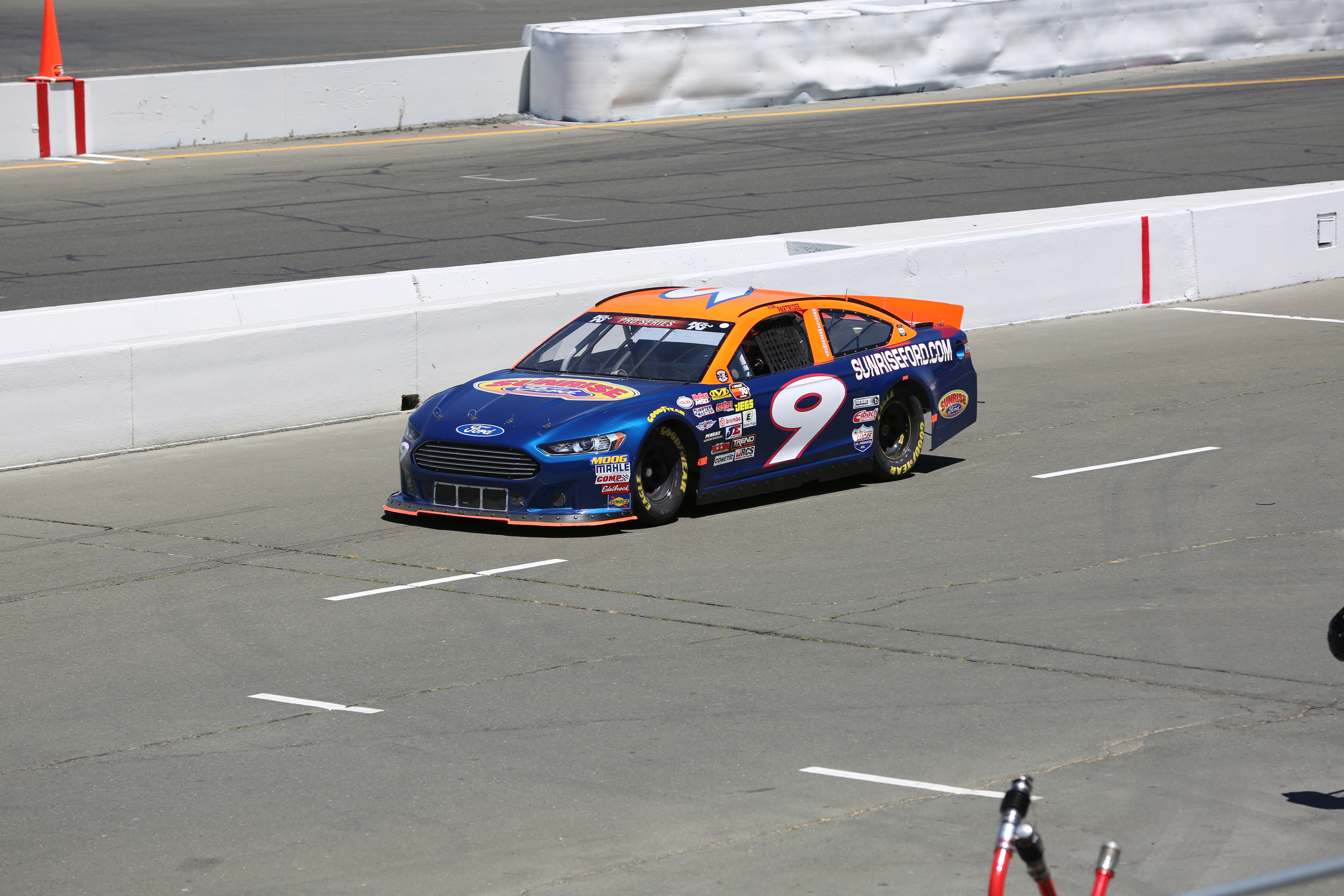
Ryan Partridge, driving the No. 9 car for Sunrise Ford Racing, finished third in the championship.

The 2015 NASCAR K&N Pro Series West was the sixty-second season of the K&N Pro Series West. Beginning with the NAPA Auto Parts 150 at Kern County Raceway Park on March 28, the season ended on November 12 with the Casino Arizona 200 at Phoenix International Raceway . Two-time champion Greg Pursley did not defend his series title, as he retired from full-time competition at the end of the 2014 season. Chris Eggleston won the championship, seven points ahead of Noah Gragson.

== Drivers ==
No.	Manufacturer	Car Owner	Race Driver	Crew Chief
00	Toyota	Bill McAnally	Cole Custer 1	Rich Lushes
00	Toyota	Bill McAnally	Eddie Cheever III (R) 1	Michael Muñoz
0	Chevrolet	Ralph E. Byers	Bobby Hillis Jr. 4	Ralph E. Byers
1	Chevrolet	Valerie Inglebright	Jim Inglebright 1	Rodney Haygood
2	Chevrolet	James Cooley	Kyle Kelley 1	James Cooley
3	Toyota	Ben Kennedy	Kaz Grala (R) 2	Mike Fritts
04	Ford	Ronnie Bassett	Ronnie Bassett Jr. (R) 1	Jerry Babb
4	Chevrolet	Bob Farmer	Dan O'Donnell (R) 1	Bob Johns
05	Chevrolet	Harry Scott Jr.	Justin Haley (R) 2	Mark McFarland
5	Chevrolet	Charlie Silva	Jack Sellers 2	Brian Carson
5	Chevrolet	Charlie Silva	Justin Funkhouser 1	Charlie Silva
5	Chevrolet	Jack Sellers	Michael Shawhan (R) 1	Thomas Wicks
06	Chevrolet 2	Kirby Parke	Christian McGhee (R) 2	Dave Hansen
06	Toyota 9	Kirby Parke	Dylan Jones (R) 1	Dave Hansen
06	Toyota 9	Kirby Parke	Rob Powers (R) 1	Scott Schumaker
06	Toyota 9	Kirby Parke	John Wood 3	Mike Holleran
06	Toyota 9	Kirby Parke	Dylan Caldwell (R) 3	Pat Mejia
06	Toyota 9	Kirby Parke	Colton Nelson (R) 1	Camoyne Warf
6	Ford	Bob Bruncati	James Bickford	Bill Sedgwick
7	Ford	Jerry Pitts	Noah Gragson (R)	Jerry Pitts
8	Toyota 4	Bill Hall	Johnny Borneman III 4	Steve Teets
8	Chevrolet 3	Bill Hall	Johnny Borneman III 2	Steve Teets
8	Chevrolet 3	Bill Hall	Dylan Cappello (R) 1	Steve Teets
09	Chevrolet	Rodrigo San Martin	Christian Celaya (R) 1	Tony Ponkauskas
9	Ford	Bob Bruncati	Ryan Partridge (R) (Note: At the Casey's General Store 150 at Iowa, NASCAR regulations state when an East team and a West team use the same car number, the team that qualifies faster will be able to retain their number. West Series drivers who had to change numbers after qualifying: Ryan Partridge drove car number 91, instead of his regular car number 9 and Gracin Raz drove car number 72, instead of his regular car number 27.) (Note: At the #ThanksKenny 150 at Iowa, NASCAR regulations state when an East team and a West team use the same car number, the team that qualifies faster will be able to retain their number. Ryan Partridge was the only West Series driver who had to change his number after qualifying as he drove car number 91, instead of his regular car number 9.)	Jeff Schrader
11	Chevrolet	John Krebs	Thomas Martin 4	Jake Koens
12	Toyota	Jeff Burton	Harrison Burton (R) 2	Rich Lushes
13	Toyota 3	Kelly Souza	Todd Souza 4	Michael Muñoz
13	Ford 1	Kelly Souza	Todd Souza 4	Michael Muñoz
14	Toyota 12	Penny Wood	Matt Levin (R)	Chase Newell
14	Ford 1	Penny Wood	Matt Levin (R)	Chase Newell
15	Chevrolet	Jack Sellers	Justin Funkhouser 2	Eric Steele
15	Chevrolet	Charlie Silva	Jack Sellers 2	Eric Steele
16	Toyota	Mike Curb	Brandon McReynolds	Ty Joiner
17	Chevrolet	Steve McGowan	David Mayhew	Corey LaJoie
18	Toyota	Becky Kann	Bill Kann 3	James Kornemann
20	Toyota 1	Bill McAnally	Cole Moore (R) 1	Matt Goslant
20	Chevrolet 1	Bob Newberry	Spencer Davis (R) 1	Doug Howe
21	Chevrolet	Steve Portenga	Alex Schutte (R)	Steve Portenga
22	Chevrolet	John Stange	Christian Celaya (R) 1	Jimmy Heuberger
25	Chevrolet	Mike Naake	Tom Klauer 1	Harold Kunsman
26	Ford	Kirby Parke	Greg Pursley 1	Aaron Jimenez
27	Ford	Jeff Jefferson	Gracin Raz (R)	Jeff Jefferson
30	Toyota 5	Nick Sommers	Ron Norman (R)	Walter Dotson
30	Ford 9	Nick Sommers	Ron Norman (R)	Walter Dotson
31	Chevrolet	Windi Portenga	Johnny White (R)	Tommy Hurst
33	Chevrolet 2	Mike Behar	Nicole Behar (R)	Mike Behar
33	Ford 2	Mike Behar	Nicole Behar (R)	Mike Behar
33	Toyota 9	Mike Behar	Nicole Behar (R)	Mike Behar
36	Chevrolet 1	Kevin McCarty	John Wood 1	Mike Holleran
36	Toyota 4	Kevin McCarty	John Wood 2	Mike Holleran
36	Toyota 4	Kevin McCarty	Dylan Caldwell (R) 1	Dave Hansen
36	Toyota 4	Kevin McCarty	Jesse Iwuji (R) 1	Joe Ranson
36	Ford 3	Kevin McCarty	Jim Weiler (R) 1	Rodd Kneeland
36	Ford 3	Kevin McCarty	Rob Powers (R) 1	Scott Schumacher
36	Ford 3	Kevin McCarty	Jesse Iwuji (R) 2	Nick Sommers
36	Ford 3	Kevin McCarty	Colton Nelson (R) 1	Jim Weiler
38	Ford 2	Mike Holleran	Rob Powers (R) 1	Scott Schumacher
38	Ford 2	Mike Holleran	Johnny Moore 1	Dale Dodds
38	Toyota 5	Mike Holleran	Andrew Porter (R) 1	Ed Ash
38	Toyota 5	Mike Holleran	Duane Hunt (R) 1	Ed Ash
38	Toyota 5	Mike Holleran	Rob Powers (R) 1	Scott Schumacher
38	Toyota 5	Mike Holleran	Dylan Caldwell (R) 1	Kevin McCarty
38	Toyota 5	Mike Holleran	Jack Nugent (R) 1	Happy Ferree
38	Dodge 1	Mike Holleran	Dave Smith 1	Dylan Caldwell
38	Chevrolet 1	Mike Holleran	Trevor Cristiani (R) 1	Brandon Riehl
39	Toyota	Scott Schumacher	Rob Powers (R) 1	Scott Schumacher
39	Toyota	Scott Schumacher	Dylan Caldwell (R) 1	Pat Mejia
40	Chevrolet	Michael Hillman	Austin Dillon 1	Doug Chouinard
40	Chevrolet	Michael Hillman	Travis Miller (R) 1	Mark Hillman
41	Chevrolet	Douglas Fuller	Landon Cassill 1	Branon Bishop
44	Toyota	Dave Reed	Austin Reed (R) 1	Craig Raudman
46	Chevrolet	Jane Thompson	Hannah Newhouse (R) 3	Duane Knorr
47	Ford 1	Michelle Ivie	Scott Ivie 2	Mike D'Arcy
47	Toyota 1	Michelle Ivie	Scott Ivie 2	Mike D'Arcy
48	Chevrolet	Steve Green	Clayton Green (R) 1	Steve Green
51	Toyota	Carlos Vieira	Carlos Vieira 4	Mario Isola
52	Chevrolet	Harry Scott Jr.	Dalton Sargeant (R) 2	Kris Bowen
54	Toyota	Bill McAnally	Christopher Bell (R) 2	Jerry Baxter
54	Toyota	Bill McAnally	Blaine Perkins (R) 1	Duane Knorr
54	Toyota	Bill McAnally	Todd Gilliland (R) 1	Seth Smith
55	Ford 10	Dione Jefferson	Dalton Sargeant (R) 2	Kris Bowen
55	Ford 10	Dione Jefferson	Dustin Ash (R) 1	Aaron Jimenez
55	Ford 10	Dione Jefferson	Buddy Shepherd (R) 2	Mario Isola
55	Ford 10	Dione Jefferson	Blake Williams (R) 5	Kevin Richards
55	Toyota 3	Dione Jefferson	John Wood 2	Mike Holleran
55	Toyota 3	Dione Jefferson	Matt Tifft 1	Tripp Bruce
60	Ford	Bill McAnally	Trevor Bayne 1	Duane Knorr
61	Chevrolet 8	Richard Thompson	Brett Thompson 7	Will Harris
61	Chevrolet 8	Richard Thompson	John Newhouse (R) 1	Will Harris
61	Ford 1	Richard Thompson	Brett Thompson 1	Will Harris
68	Chevrolet	Jenise Kneeland	Rodd Kneeland (R) 2	Jim Weiler
68	Chevrolet	Jenise Kneeland	Colton Nelson (R) 1	Camoyne Warf
71	Chevrolet	Dave Hansen	Clayton Green (R) 2	Steve Green
71	Chevrolet	Dave Hansen	Christian McGhee (R) 1	Dave Hansen
74	Chevrolet	Thomas Tyrrell	Luis Tyrrell 3	Mike Naake
81	Toyota	Dwight Kennedy	D. J. Kennington 1	David Wight
83	Chevrolet	Todd Havens	Braeden Havens 3	Travis Sharpe
84	Chevrolet	Richard DeLong	Rich DeLong III 12	Dean Kuhn
86	Ford 1	Tim Spurgeon	Tim Spurgeon (R) 1	Dean Langston
86	Toyota 1	Tim Spurgeon	John Wood 1	Mike Holleran
91	Chevrolet	Justin Marks	William Byron (R) 2	Kevin Bellicourt
96	Toyota	Ben Kennedy	Ben Kennedy 1	Steve Zipadelli
99	Toyota	Bill McAnally	Chris Eggleston	Roger Bracken

== Schedule ==
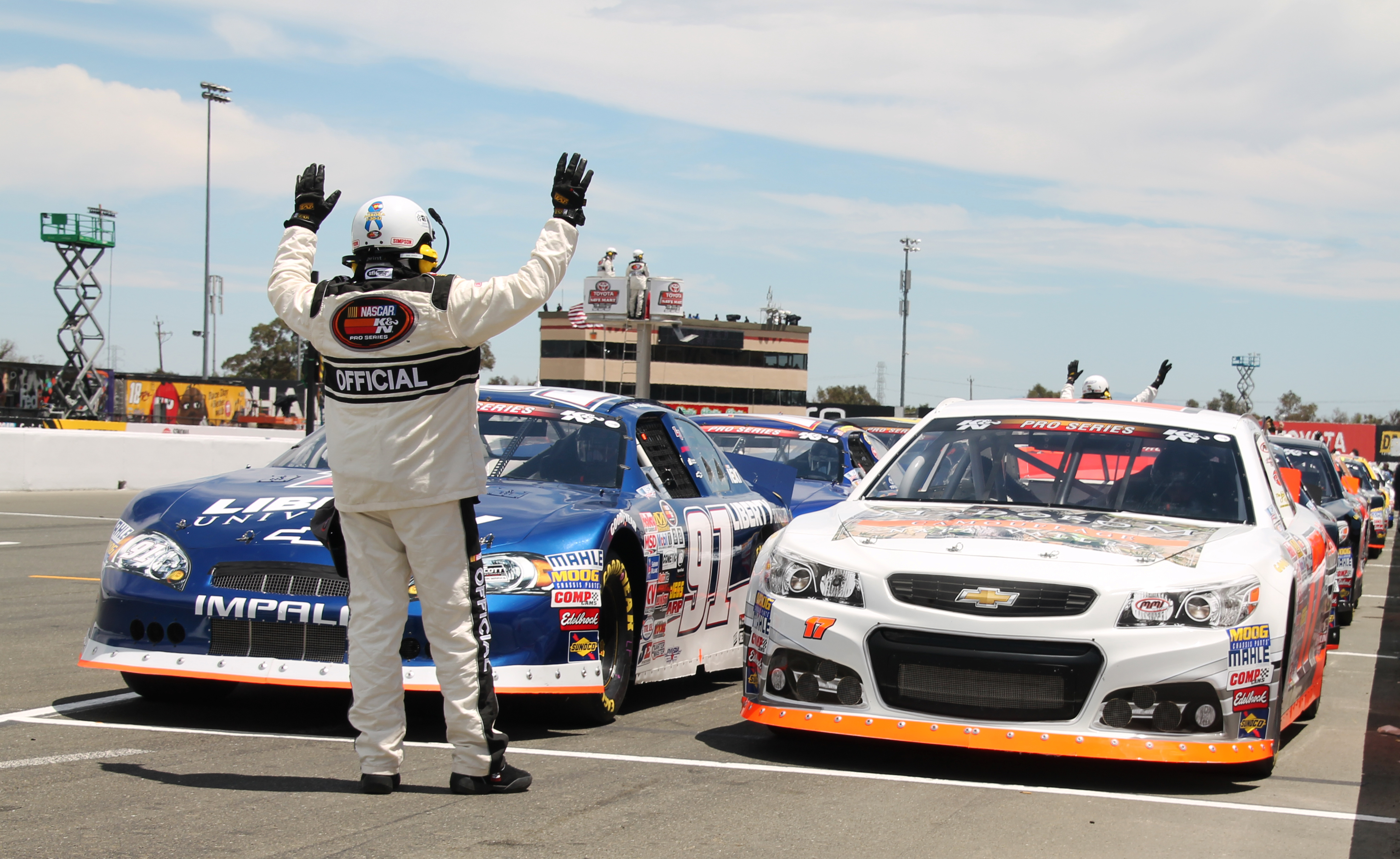
The starting grid lined up in pit lane prior to the Carneros 200 at Sonoma Raceway, the only road course of the 2015 season.

All of the races in the 2015 season will be televised on NBCSN and will be on a tape delay basis.

No.	Race title	Track	Date
1	NAPA Auto Parts 150	Kern County Raceway Park, Bakersfield, California	March 28
2	King Taco Catering/NAPA Auto Parts 150	Irwindale Speedway, Irwindale, California	April 11
3	NAPA Auto Parts Wildcat 150	Tucson Speedway, Tucson, Arizona	May 2
4	Casey's General Store 150 (Note: The Casey's General Store 150 was held as a combined event, with competitors from the K&N Pro Series West competing along with competitors for the K&N Pro Series East. The race was run with a series-based point distribution, where drivers received points and statistical credit for their finish relative to other drivers in their series, not to the whole field in general.)	Iowa Speedway, Newton, Iowa	May 16
5	Bill Schmitt Memorial 150	Shasta Speedway, Anderson, California	May 30
6	Carneros 200	Sonoma Raceway, Sonoma, California	June 27
7	NAPA Auto Parts/Toyota 150	Stateline Speedway, Post Falls, Idaho	July 11
8	#ThanksKenny 150 (Note: The #ThanksKenny 150 was held as a combined event, with competitors from the K&N Pro Series West competing along with competitors for the K&N Pro Series East. The race was run with a series-based point distribution, where drivers received points and statistical credit for their finish relative to other drivers in their series, not to the whole field in general.)	Iowa Speedway, Newton, Iowa	July 31
9	NAPA Auto Parts 150 presented by Toyota	Evergreen Speedway, Monroe, Washington	August 15
10	NAPA Auto Parts/Toyota 150	Colorado National Speedway, Dacono, Colorado	August 22
11	NAPA Auto Parts Idaho 208	Meridian Speedway, Meridian, Idaho	September 5
12	NAPA Auto Parts/Toyota 150 presented by Axle Crutch	All American Speedway, Roseville, California	October 17
13	Casino Arizona 100	Phoenix International Raceway, Avondale, Arizona	November 12

== Results and standings ==
=== Races ===
No.	Race	Pole position	Most laps led	Winning driver	Manufacturer	No.	Winning team
1	NAPA Auto Parts 150	Dalton Sargeant	David Mayhew	Dalton Sargeant	Ford	55	Jefferson Pitts Racing
2	King Taco Catering/NAPA Auto Parts 150	Dalton Sargeant	Chris Eggleston	Chris Eggleston	Toyota	99	Bill McAnally Racing
3	NAPA Auto Parts Wildcat 150	Ron Norman	Ryan Partridge	Noah Gragson	Ford	7	Jefferson Pitts Racing
4	Casey's General Store 150	Brandon McReynolds	William Byron	Brandon McReynolds	Toyota	16	Bill McAnally Racing
5	Bill Schmitt Memorial 150	David Mayhew	David Mayhew	Chris Eggleston	Toyota	99	Bill McAnally Racing
6	Carneros 200	David Mayhew	Dalton Sargeant	David Mayhew	Chevrolet	17	Steve McGowan Motorsports
7	NAPA Auto Parts/Toyota 150	James Bickford	James Bickford	James Bickford	Ford	6	Sunrise Ford Racing
8	#ThanksKenny 150	Brandon McReynolds	Brandon McReynolds	Brandon McReynolds	Toyota	16	Bill McAnally Racing
9	NAPA Auto Parts 150 presented by Toyota	James Bickford	David Mayhew	David Mayhew	Chevrolet	17	Steve McGowan Motorsports
10	NAPA Auto Parts/Toyota 150	Ryan Partridge	Ryan Partridge	Ryan Partridge	Ford	9	Sunrise Ford Racing
11	NAPA Auto Parts Idaho 208	Noah Gragson	Noah Gragson	Noah Gragson	Ford	7	Jefferson Pitts Racing
12	NAPA Auto Parts/Toyota 150 presented by Axle Crutch	Gracin Raz	Alex Schutte	Gracin Raz	Ford	27	Jefferson Pitts Racing
13	Casino Arizona 100	Justin Haley	Justin Haley	Todd Gilliland	Toyota	54	Bill McAnally Racing

=== Drivers' championship ===
(key) Bold - Pole position awarded by time. Italics - Pole position set by final practice results or rainout. * – Most laps led.

Pos	Driver	KER	IRW	TUC	IOW	SHA	SON	SLN	IOW	EVG	CNS	MER	AAS	PHO	Points
1	Chris Eggleston	5	1*	9	15	1	13	11	16	3	3	4	3	11	511
2	Noah Gragson **(R)**	3	7	1	7	16	7	2	5	5	8	**1***	8	14	504
3	Ryan Partridge **(R)**	13	5	4*	20	6	4	4	18	2	**1***	11	9	12	498
4	Gracin Raz **(R)**	6	4	2	17	4	12	3	23	4	6	6	**1**	24	489
5	Alex Schutte **(R)**	10	9	15	16	9	8	9	10	6	7	8	2*	13	468
6	David Mayhew	2*	6	14	11	**20***	**1**	10	38	1*	4	21	4	29	458
7	Brandon McReynolds	27	12	8	1	7	19	8	**1***	12	5	2	24	3	455
8	James Bickford	4	17	6	24	2	28	**1***	6	**8**	10	14	23	8	446
9	Johnny White **(R)**	7	10	10	35	3	14	12	22	11	15	5	6	16	440
10	Nicole Behar **(R)**	21	2	5	21	10	23	7	21	9	9	17	7	22	424
11	Matt Levin **(R)**	17	19	11	28	17	25	14	28	10	13	12	16	23	372
12	Ron Norman **(R)**	26	14	**12**	32	23	30	6	35	13	11	18	22	26	346
13	Rich DeLong III	16	27	20	39	14	21	13	32	14	14	16	20		326
14	Brett Thompson	8	8	13	26	11	33					9		28	231
15	John Wood	22	18	17	33	21	26	16	36			22			226
16	Blake Williams **(R)**							5		7	2		10	18	178
17	Dalton Sargeant **(R)**	**1**	**3**		23^{1}		2*		13^{1}					4	173
18	Dylan Caldwell **(R)**					19		17	29	17		10	Wth^{3}		165
19	Johnny Borneman III	25	22	7			11			16				DNQ^{4}	150
20	Rob Powers **(R)**	18			38	22		15				13			136
21	Thomas Martin	14	11			8	24								119
22	Carlos Vieira	11	16			15	37								97
23	Braeden Havens							18		15			5		94
24	Clayton Green **(R)**											7	12	19	94
25	Jack Sellers	15	21			24	31								85
26	Luis Tyrrell	19				13	16								84
27	Todd Souza		25	16			34							17	84
28	William Byron **(R)**				**2***^{1}		5		19^{1}					2	82
29	Buddy Shepherd **(R)**					5						3			80
30	Christian McGhee **(R)**	9	13											DNQ^{4}	79
31	Hannah Newhouse **(R)**	12	26									15			79
32	Justin Funkhouser	20	24			12									76
33	Christopher Bell **(R)**		15		5										71
34	Harrison Burton **(R)**												11	6	71
35	Bobby Hillis Jr.	24	23	22										DNQ^{4}	63
36	Justin Haley **(R)**				6^{1}		3		7^{1}					**21***	66
37	Jesse Iwuji **(R)**									DNS^{2}		23	Wth^{3}		65
38	Colton Nelson **(R)**											19	18	DNQ^{4}	60
39	Bill Kann			23			27							DNQ^{4}	48
40	Todd Gilliland **(R)**													1	47
41	Rodd Kneeland **(R)**					18							Wth^{3}		43
42	Dustin Ash **(R)**			3											41
43	Kaz Grala **(R)**				29^{1}		17		11^{1}					30	41
44	Landon Cassill													5	39
45	Austin Dillon						6								38
46	Travis Miller				37^{1}				24^{1}					7	37
47	Christian Celaya **(R)**			19	27^{1}				30^{1}					DNQ^{4}	37
48	Cole Custer						9								35
49	D. J. Kennington													9	35
50	Trevor Bayne						10								34
51	Ronnie Bassett Jr.				3				37					10	34
52	Jack Nugent **(R)**										12				32
53	Blaine Perkins **(R)**												13		31
54	John Newhouse **(R)**												14		30
55	Scott Ivie	23					35								30
56	Matt Tifft						15								29
57	Eddie Cheever III **(R)**												15		29
58	Greg Pursley													15	29
59	Johnny Moore												17		27
60	Dylan Jones **(R)**			18											26
61	Michael Shawhan **(R)**						18								26
62	Cole Moore **(R)**												19		25
63	Andrew Porter **(R)**		20												24
64	Tom Klauer						20								24
65	Trevor Cristiani **(R)**											20			24
66	Austin Reed **(R)**													20	24
67	Duane Hunt **(R)**			21											23
68	Dylan Cappello **(R)**												21		23
69	Jim Weiler **(R)**						22								22
70	Ben Kennedy													25	19
71	Spencer Davis **(R)**								3^{1}					27	17
72	Dan O'Donnell **(R)**												Wth^{3}		16
73	Dave Smith						29								15
74	Jim Inglebright						32								12
75	Tim Spurgeon **(R)**						36								8
76	Kyle Kelley						38								6
Drivers ineligible for K&N Pro Series West points
	Jesse Little				4				2						
	Rico Abreu **(R)**				30				4						
	Scott Heckert				8				8						
	Kyle Benjamin **(R)**				9				14						
	Collin Cabre **(R)**				22				9						
	Austin Hill				10				26						
	Jay Beasley				12				12						
	David Garbo Jr. **(R)**				13				17						
	Trey Hutchens				14				20						
	Dillon Bassett **(R)**				34				15						
	Nick Drake				18				25						
	Eddie MacDonald				19										
	Kenzie Ruston				25				34						
	Chad Finchum								27						
	Devon Amos **(R)**				31				31						
	Mike Senica **(R)**								33						
	Gray Gaulding				36										
Pos	Driver	KER	IRW	TUC	IOW	SHA	SON	SLN	IOW	EVG	CNS	MER	AAS	PHO	Points

Notes

- ^{1} – Scored points towards the K&N Pro Series East.
- ^{2} – Jesse Iwuji received championship points, despite the fact that he did not start the race.
- ^{3} – Dylan Caldwell, Jesse Iwuji, Robb Kneeland and Dan O'Donnell received championship points, despite the fact that they withdrew prior to the race.
- ^{4} – Johnny Borneman III, Christian Celaya, Bobby Hillis Jr., Bill Kann, Christian McGhee and Colton Nelson received championship points, despite the fact that they did not qualify for the race.

== See also ==
- 2015 NASCAR Sprint Cup Series
- 2015 NASCAR Xfinity Series
- 2015 NASCAR Camping World Truck Series
- 2015 ARCA Racing Series
- 2015 NASCAR K&N Pro Series East
- 2015 NASCAR Whelen Modified Tour
- 2015 NASCAR Whelen Southern Modified Tour
- 2015 NASCAR Canadian Tire Series
- 2015 NASCAR Mexico Series
- 2015 NASCAR Whelen Euro Series
