= Rob Powers (racing driver) =

American racing driver

- Born: February 5, 1969 (age 57); Meridian, Idaho, U.S.

ARCA Menards Series career
- 1 race run over 1 year
- Best finish: 96th (2018)
- First race: 2018 General Tire 200 (Talladega)
Wins	Top tens	Poles
0	0	0

ARCA Menards Series West career
- 6 races run over 2 years
- Best finish: 20th (2015)
- First race: 2015 NAPA Auto Parts 150 (Kern County)
- Last race: 2019 Star Nursery 100 (Las Vegas Dirt)
Wins	Top tens	Poles
0	0	0
- Statistics up to date as of February 7, 2025.

Rob Powers (born February 5, 1969) is an American former professional stock car racing driver who has competed in the ARCA Racing Series and the NASCAR K&N Pro Series West.

Powers has also previously competed in the Rocky Mountain Challenge Series, the Pro Trucks Series, and the Northwest Pro-4 Alliance Challenge Series.

== Motorsports results ==
=== NASCAR ===
(key) (Bold - Pole position awarded by qualifying time. Italics - Pole position earned by points standings or practice time. * – Most laps led.)

==== K&N Pro Series West ====
NASCAR K&N Pro Series West results
Year	Team	No.	Make	1	2	3	4	5	6	7	8	9	10	11	12	13	14	NKNPSWC	Pts	Ref
2015	Kart Idaho Racing	38	Ford	KCR; 18	IRW	TUS												20th	136	
2015	Kirby Parke	06	Toyota				IOW; 16											20th	136	
2015	Kart Idaho Racing	38	Toyota					SHA; 22	SON									20th	136	
2015	Kart Idaho Racing	36	Toyota							SLS; 15	IOW	EVG	CNS					20th	136	
2015	Kart Idaho Racing	39	Toyota											MER; 13	AAS	PHO		20th	136	
2019	Kart Idaho Racing	38	Ford	LVS; 13	IRW	TUS	TUS	CNS	SON	DCS	IOW	EVG	GTW	MER	AAS	KCR	PHO	52nd	31	

=== ARCA Racing Series ===
(key) (Bold – Pole position awarded by qualifying time. Italics – Pole position earned by points standings or practice time. * – Most laps led.)

ARCA Racing Series results
Year	Team	No.	Make	1	2	3	4	5	6	7	8	9	10	11	12	13	14	15	16	17	18	19	20	ARSC	Pts	Ref
2018	Patriot Motorsports Group	38	Chevy	DAY	NSH	SLM	TAL; 18	TOL	CLT	POC	MCH	MAD	GTW	CHI	IOW	ELK	POC	ISF	BLN	DSF	SLM	IRP	KAN	96th	140	
