= Steve Portenga =

American racing driver (born 1970)

- Born: May 22, 1970 (age 56); Sparks, Nevada, U.S.
- Achievements: 1994, 1998 NASCAR Featherlite Southwest Tour Champion

NASCAR O'Reilly Auto Parts Series career
- 1 race run over 1 year
- Best finish: 137th (1999)
- First race: 1999 NAPA Autocare 250 (Pikes Peak)
Wins	Top tens	Poles
0	0	0

NASCAR FedEx Freight Truck Series career
- 48 races run over 4 years
- Best finish: 13th (1995)
- First race: 1995 Racing Champions 200 (Tucson)
- Last race: 2002 Ford 200 (Homestead)
Wins	Top tens	Poles
0	5	0
- Statistics up to date as of December 24, 2011.

Steven Portenga (born May 22, 1970) is an American former NASCAR driver. He spent more than two decades racing in various national and regional support series to NASCAR Sprint Cup Series, and he won the NASCAR Featherlite Southwest Tour championship for late models in 1994 and 1998. Portenga and his wife, Windi, are now car owners of the No. 21 & No. 31 cars in the NASCAR K&N Pro Series West, where he's also the crew chief for one of those drivers, Alex Schutte.

Portenga won his first racing championship in 1991 at Silver State Raceway in the Winston Racing Series. In 1995, he competed full-time in the Craftsman Truck Series, winning one pole and finishing in the top-ten three times, finishing thirteenth in points.

Portenga ran six races the following year, his best finish 15th at Phoenix International Raceway. In 1999, he made his Busch Series debut at Pikes Peak International Raceway, finishing 41st. He also attempted to make his Winston Cup debut at Sears Point International Raceway, but failed to qualify.

In 2001, Portenga returned to the trucks, running two races for MacDonald Motorsports and one race in his own truck, finishing fourteenth at Kansas Speedway. He ran two races the next year, posting two top-tens. He attempted Phoenix with Ware Racing Enterprises in the Cup series in 2006, but missed the race.

== Motorsports career results ==
=== NASCAR ===
(key) (Bold - Pole position awarded by qualifying time. Italics - Pole position earned by points standings or practice time. * – Most laps led.)

==== Nextel Cup Series ====
NASCAR Nextel Cup Series results
Year	Team	No.	Make	1	2	3	4	5	6	7	8	9	10	11	12	13	14	15	16	17	18	19	20	21	22	23	24	25	26	27	28	29	30	31	32	33	34	35	36	NNCC	Pts	Ref
1999	Golden Gate Racing	96	Pontiac	DAY	CAR	LVS	ATL	DAR	TEX	BRI	MAR	TAL	CAL	RCH	CLT	DOV	MCH	POC	SON; DNQ	DAY	NHA	POC	IND	GLN	MCH	BRI	DAR	RCH	NHA	DOV	MAR	CLT	TAL	CAR	PHO	HOM	ATL			N/A	0	
2005	Mach 1 Motorsports	34	Chevy	DAY	CAL	LVS	ATL	BRI	MAR	TEX	PHO; DNQ	TAL	DAR	RCH	CLT	DOV	POC	MCH	SON	DAY	CHI	NHA	POC	IND	GLN	MCH	BRI	CAL	RCH	NHA	DOV	TAL	KAN	CLT	MAR	ATL	TEX	PHO	HOM	N/A	0	
2006	Rick Ware Racing	52	Dodge	DAY	CAL	LVS	ATL	BRI	MAR	TEX	PHO; DNQ	TAL	RCH	DAR	CLT	DOV	POC	MCH	SON	DAY	CHI	NHA	POC	IND	GLN	MCH	BRI	CAL	RCH	NHA	DOV	KAN	TAL	CLT	MAR	ATL	TEX	PHO	HOM	N/A	0	

==== Busch Series ====
NASCAR Busch Series results
Year	Team	No.	Make	1	2	3	4	5	6	7	8	9	10	11	12	13	14	15	16	17	18	19	20	21	22	23	24	25	26	27	28	29	30	31	32	NBSC	Pts	Ref
1999	Golden Gate Racing	14	Chevy	DAY	CAR	LVS	ATL	DAR	TEX	NSV	BRI	TAL	CAL	NHA	RCH	NZH	CLT	DOV	SBO	GLN	MLW	MYB	PPR; 41	GTY	IRP	MCH	BRI	DAR	RCH	DOV	CLT	CAR	MEM	PHO	HOM	137th	0	

==== Craftsman Truck Series ====
NASCAR Craftsman Truck Series results
Year	Team	No.	Make	1	2	3	4	5	6	7	8	9	10	11	12	13	14	15	16	17	18	19	20	21	22	23	24	NCTC	Pts	Ref
1995	L&M Racing	83	Chevy	PHO	TUS; 22	SGS	MMR; 21	POR; 19	EVG; 12	I70; 5	LVL; 6	BRI; 24	MLW; 20	CNS; 9	HPT; 25	IRP; 17	FLM; 16	RCH; 14	MAR; 11	NWS; 13	SON; 16	MMR; 24	PHO; 26					13th	2048	
1996	L&M Racing	83	Chevy	HOM	PHO; 15	POR; 28	EVG; 13	TUS	CNS; 17	HPT	BRI	NZH	MLW	LVL	I70	IRP; 31	FLM	GLN	NSV	RCH	NHA	MAR	NWS	SON; 25	MMR	PHO	LVS	41st	591	
2001	MacDonald Motorsports	72	Chevy	DAY	HOM	MMR; 32	MAR	GTY	DAR	PPR	DOV	TEX	MEM	MLW	KAN; 14	KEN	NHA	IRP	NSH	CIC	NZH	RCH	SBO	TEX	LVS	PHO		67th	249	
2001	Portenga Motorsports	39	Chevy																								CAL; 34	67th	249	
2002	Portenga Motorsports	39	Chevy	DAY; 32	DAR; 26	MAR; DNQ	GTY; 14	PPR; 8	DOV; 13	TEX; 28	MEM; 27	MLW; 17	KAN; 11	KEN; 10	NHA; 16	MCH; 11	IRP; 23	NSH; 22	RCH; 29	TEX; 25	SBO; 13	LVS; 28	CAL; 26	PHO; 22	HOM; 19			18th	2167	

Sporting positions
Preceded by Ron Hornaday, Jr; Brian Germone	NASCAR Featherlite Southwest Tour Champion; 1994; 1998	Succeeded by Lance Hooper; Kurt Busch
