= Hannah Newhouse =

American racing driver and reporter (born 1997)

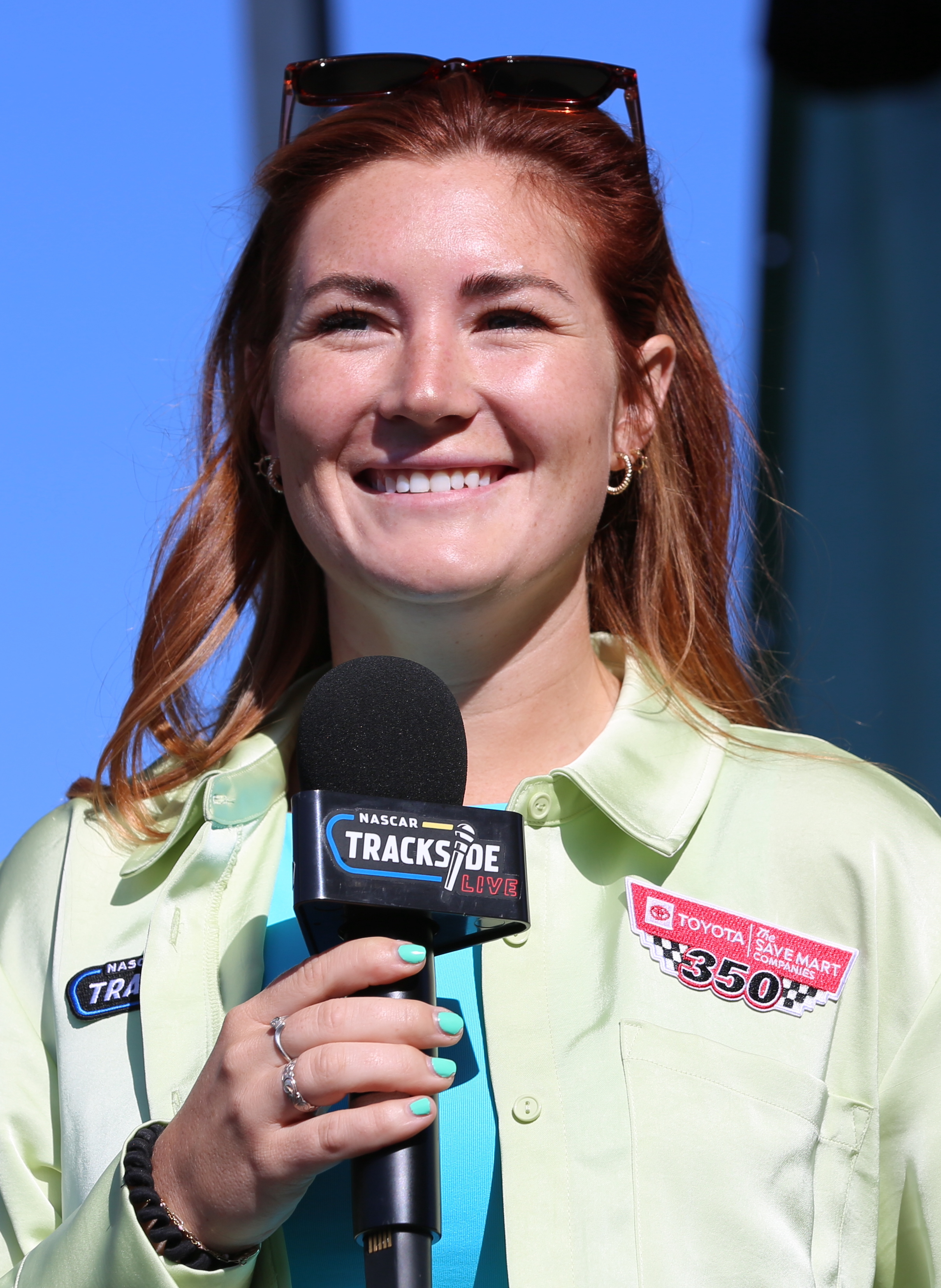
- Newhouse at Sonoma Raceway in 2024
- Nationality: (United States) American
- Born: February 4, 1997 (age 29) Twin Falls, Idaho, U.S.
- Relatives: John Newhouse (father)

NASCAR K&N Pro Series West career
- Debut season: 2012
- Former teams: Thompson Motorsports, Kevin McCarty, Jefferson Pitts Racing
- Starts: 7
- Wins: 0
- Poles: 0
- Best finish: 29th in 2015
- Finished last season: 31st (2016)

Previous series
- 2016: CARS Super Late Model Tour
- Statistics up to date as of August 24, 2020.

Hannah Newhouse (born February 4, 1997) is an American professional stock car racing driver and reporter. After driving for four years in what is now the ARCA Menards Series West, she is currently working as a pit reporter and analyst in NASCAR for Motor Racing Network and various other websites and racetracks and in IMSA on TV for NBC.

== Career ==
=== Driving career ===
Newhouse began racing at age five in go-karts and by age twelve had moved up to late model racing and the ASA Intermountain Pro Truck Series.

Newhouse made her debut in the NASCAR K&N Pro Series West in 2012, driving for Thompson Motorsports in the No. 60 Chevrolet at NAPA Speedway in Albuquerque, New Mexico. Newhouse had previously driven for Thompson in the NASCAR Whelen All-American Series, where she won a race at her home track of Magic Valley Speedway, becoming the youngest winner in series history. Although she had a strong performance in her West Series debut, finishing sixth, Newhouse failed to qualify for her other start of the year at All American Speedway. The sixth-place finish she earned was the highest for a female in the West Series at the time, and she also became the youngest driver to start a race in the series at the time at age 15.

Newhouse did not make any West Series starts in 2013, but competed in the Rocky Mountain Challenge Series. She returned for the 2014 West Series season-finale at Phoenix in Kevin McCarty's No. 36 car. Newhouse was named as one of 20 participants in NASCAR's 2014 Drive for Diversity combine. In 2015, Newhouse returned to Thompson Motorsports and drove their No. 46 entry in a handful of races that year with her college, Boise State University, serving as her sponsor when she was a student at the school.

Newhouse's most recent starts in NASCAR as a driver came in 2016, driving the No. 55 Ford for Jefferson Pitts Racing, finishing seventh at Irwindale and 16th at Meridian.

In 2020, Newhouse announced a potential opportunity to return to the track as a driver at Hickory Speedway in September, sponsorship pending. Newhouse publicly reached out asking for sponsors on social media, leading NASCAR Cup Series driver Bubba Wallace to offer to pick up the tire bill.

=== Broadcasting career ===
Newhouse began working for various radio networks and racetracks as a reporter after she was without a ride in the West Series. While she was still driving in the series, Newhouse attended Boise State University where she earned degrees in marketing and public relations as well as media and journalism, with plans to become a broadcaster should she be unable to move up the ladder in her driving career. Newhouse has most notably worked for Motor Racing Network as a pit reporter as well as the co-host (along with Kyle Rickey) of their NASCAR Coast to Coast podcast. In addition to MRN, Newhouse has also worked at tracks such as Bristol Motor Speedway as a reporter on their public address system and jumbo screens, as well as for Speed51.com and Fans Choice TV.

In April 2019, while working the NASCAR K&N Pro Series East race at Bristol, the Zombie Auto 150, for Fans Choice TV, Newhouse was caught on hot mic calling driver Riley Herbst a douchebag after the conclusion of her interview with Herbst after he crashed out of the race.

In 2021, Newhouse joined NBC to pit report for select IMSA races starting with the race at WeatherTech Raceway Laguna Seca. It was her debut as a TV pit reporter. She returned to pit report for select races for IMSA on NBC in 2022.

== Personal life ==
Newhouse is the daughter of John Newhouse, another racing driver who competed in motocross, late model racing, the NASCAR AutoZone Northwest Series, and the Rocky Mountain Challenge Series (where he is the 2007 champion). He also would make one West Series start in 2015 at All American Speedway, although it was not in a race that his daughter was also driving in. John drove for Thompson Motorsports in that event, the same team that Hannah drove for in the series that year.

Newhouse's favorite driver growing up was Carl Edwards, and her favorite NASCAR analyst was Shannon Spake, at the time a pit reporter for NASCAR on ESPN.

Newhouse attended Twin Falls High School where she was a cheerleader. She graduated high school a year early, proceeding to take classes at Boise State University while driving with their sponsorship.

== Motorsports career results ==
=== NASCAR ===
(key) (Bold – Pole position awarded by qualifying time. Italics – Pole position earned by points standings or practice time. * – Most laps led.)

==== K&N Pro Series West ====
NASCAR K&N Pro Series West results
Year	Team	No.	Make	1	2	3	4	5	6	7	8	9	10	11	12	13	14	15	NKNPSWC	Pts	Ref
2012	Thompson Motorsports	60	Chevy	PHO	LHC	MMP	S99	IOW	BIR	LVS	SON	EVG	CNS	IOW	PIR	SMP; 6	AAS; DNQ	PHO	44th	53	
2014	Kevin McCarty	36	Chevy	PHO	IRW	S99	IOW	KCR	SON	SLS	CNS	IOW	EVG	KCR	MMP	AAS	PHO; 23		79th	21	
2015	Thompson Motorsports	46	Chevy	KCR; 12	IRW; 26	TUS	IOW	SHA	SON	SLS	IOW	EVG	CNS	MER; 15	AAS	PHO			29th	79	
2016	Jefferson Pitts Racing	55	Ford	IRW; 7	KCR	TUS	OSS	CNS	SON	SLS	IOW	EVG	DCS	UMC	UMC	MER; 16	AAS		31st	65	

=== CARS Super Late Model Tour ===
(key)

CARS Super Late Model Tour results
Year	Team	No.	Make	1	2	3	4	5	6	7	8	9	10	CSLMTC	Pts	Ref
2016	David Gilliland Racing	98	Toyota	SNM	ROU	HCY	TCM	GRE	ROU	CON	MYB; 17			38th	36	
2016	David Gilliland Racing	98M	Toyota									HCY; 13	SNM	38th	36	
