= James Bickford (racing driver) =

American stock car racing driver (born 1998)

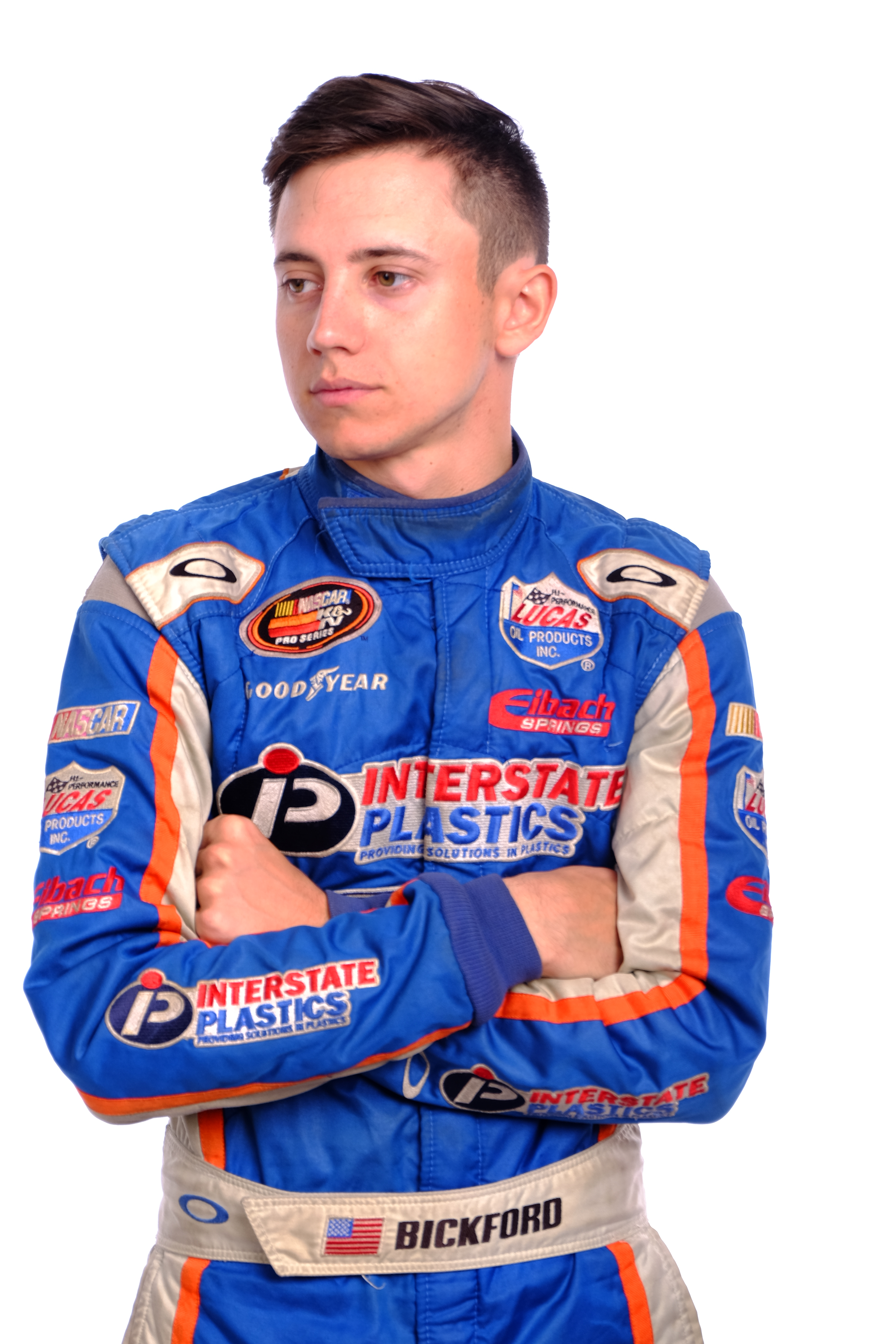
- Bickford in the 2015 Interstate Plastics/Sunrise Ford Racing suit
- Born: James Harrison Bickford; March 16, 1998 (age 28); Napa, California, U.S.
- Height: 5 ft 9 in (175 cm)
- Relatives: Jeff Gordon (cousin)

NASCAR K&N Pro Series West career
- Current team: Sunrise Ford Racing
- Years active: 2014–2015
- Car number: 6
- Crew chief: Bill Sedgwick
- Starts: 14
- Wins: 2
- Best finish: 5th in 2014
- Finished last season: 8th

Championship titles
- 2014: Sunoco Rookie of the Year Award
- Statistics up to date as of February 16, 2015.

James Harrison Bickford (born March 16, 1998) is an American former stock car racing driver from Napa, California. He last competed full-time in the NASCAR K&N Pro Series West, driving the No. 6 Ford Fusion.

Bickford is a paternal cousin of four-time NASCAR Sprint Cup champion and three-time Daytona 500 champion Jeff Gordon. Throughout his career, Bickford won over 200 main event victories and earned titles including Rookie of the Year at Ukiah Speedway (2010), Legends of the Pacific Rookie of the Year (2011), Semi-Pro Legends champion (2011), NASCAR Whelen All-American Late Model Series champion (2013), and K&N Pro Series West Rookie of the Year (2014).

== Early life ==
Bickford was born on March 16, 1998, in Napa, California, to parents Tom and Teresa Bickford. He attended St. Apollinaris Catholic School. His father, Tom Bickford, had made Quarter Midget parts in the late 1970s and early 1980s for Ron Stanley race cars, and later for nephew Jeff Gordon as Gordon and his father, John, traveled the country competing in Quarter Midget races.

== Racing career ==
=== Quarter Midgets (2004–2010) ===
Bickford began racing in Quarter Midgets at the age of five. Tom described racing at that age as a "fathers-sons-sport." By nine years old, Bickford was racing 48 weeks per year. In 2007, he won 69 of 75 races entered in just one of the three Quarter Midget divisions in which he competed.

By 2010, Bickford had won 15 Quarter Midget championships: four local track championships, two NorCal championships, four regional championships, two California 500 championships, two Western States Monza championships, and one Dirt Road National, along with close to 200 main events.

Wishing to advance to Bandolero cars, Bickford needed to raise funds for new equipment, including a HANS device and a Bandolero car. At age eleven, he organized a fundraising golf tournament for children called the "KGA" (Kids Golf Association) at Vintner's Golf Club in Yountville, California (see Fundraising).

=== Bandoleros (2010) ===
Bickford began his Bandolero season at age eleven. In his first race at Ukiah Speedway on April 10, 2010, he won the trophy dash and finished second in the A-main. On April 17, he won the Bandolero race at All-American Speedway in Roseville, California, along with the trophy dash and heat race. In late April 2010, he set a new track record at Ukiah with a lap of 15.324 seconds.

Bickford described the challenges of the Bandolero car: "The cars are fragile and they bend easy. Some drivers go out on the first day, crash into a wall, and total the car. You have to be under control." He won six main events in just 14 starts and earned Rookie of the Year at Ukiah Speedway.

Before acquiring his own Legends car, Bickford had the opportunity to test drive one belonging to Cole Custer, son of Joe Custer, Tony Stewart's General Manager. Tom Bickford had purchased James's Bandolero car from Joe Custer, who subsequently invited Bickford to visit Charlotte, North Carolina to try out Cole's Legends car.

=== Legends cars (2011–2012) ===
For the 2011 season, Bickford moved up to a Legends car in the Legends of the Pacific Series. Fellow racer Matt Scott, the 2010 Late Model champion, remarked: "If you drive a Legends car, you can drive anything," citing the car's substantially greater horsepower compared to a Bandolero.

Bickford described his first experience in a Legends car: "When I hit the throttle on the straightaway, it threw me back in my seat and that was a rush of excitement I haven't felt since I drove a Light B in Quarter Midgets back when I was eight [years old]…It is one of those cars you have to be very smooth with and also have to have good throttle control. The tires don't have much grip and it's very slippery." He competed in his first Legends race on April 2 at Stockton 99 Speedway in Stockton, California, qualifying third and finishing eighth.

Later that season, after winning the Legends main event in late October, Bickford clinched the Semi-Pro Legends Championship and secured Legends of the Pacific Rookie of the Year honors with a commanding 41-point lead with three races remaining in the season.

Bickford's 2012 Legends season was cut short in August when he broke his arm during a high school football game the day before he was scheduled to be fitted for a seat in a late model car. Although unable to drive, Bickford attended the final five races of his Legends season.

=== NASCAR Whelen All-American Series (2013) ===
In 2013, Bickford moved to full-size race cars as a rookie in the NASCAR Whelen All-American Late Models Series. On May 11, he won his first career NASCAR feature. In mid-September, Bickford claimed the 2013 NASCAR Whelen All-American Late Model Series championship at All-American Speedway in Roseville, California, becoming the youngest driver in the track's 58-year history to win a Late Model Series race and championship.

Bickford said of his championship: "I feel like I'm on top of the world…I came into this season just looking to get some practice, but I never imagined winning the championship." At this stage of his career, he had accumulated 17 championships, 15 of them in Quarter Midgets.

=== NASCAR K&N Pro Series West ===
==== 2014 season ====
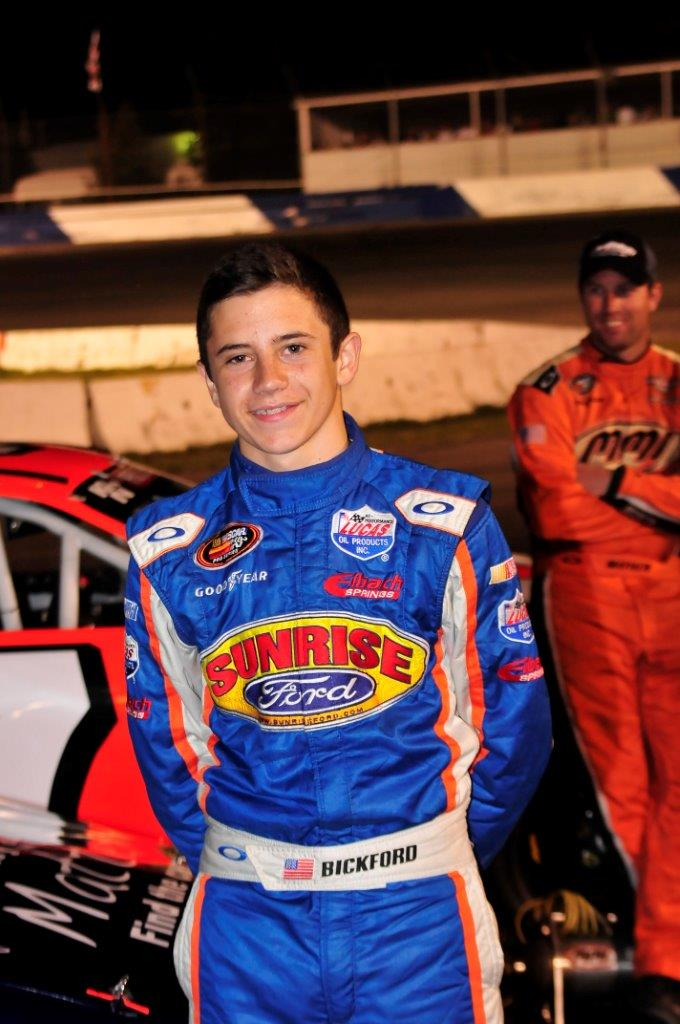
Bickford in his rookie season in 2014

Bickford entered the 2014 NASCAR K&N Pro Series West driving the No. 6 Sunrise Ford/Interstate Plastics Ford Fusion after signing a two-year contract with car owner Bob Bruncati. He replaced Derek Thorn, the 2013 K&N Pro Series West champion. Bruncati said of Bickford: "He is the best young driver I've seen in years."

Bickford raced his first road course at the 1.99-mile Sonoma Raceway on June 21, 2014. He received guidance from Jeff Gordon, who toured the track with him and advised him on braking, acceleration, shifting, and passing points. Gordon, who holds five NASCAR Cup Series victories at Sonoma—more than any other driver—commented on the challenge of the circuit.

In mid-September, Bickford clinched the 2014 NASCAR K&N Pro Series West Rookie of the Year title after placing third in the Utah Grand Prix at Miller Motorsports Park in Tooele, Utah, giving him a 32-point lead over Rich DeLong III with two races remaining—more than the maximum ten points available per race. He became the third consecutive driver—and fifth overall—to earn Rookie of the Year driving for Bruncati, joining Dylan Lupton (2013), Austin Dyne (2012), Luis Martinez Jr. (2010), and Jason Bowles (2007).

Bickford finished fifth overall in the K&N West Pro Series standings. Over the course of the season, he progressed from a 25th-place finish in his series debut to winning his first career race, accumulating one victory, eight top-five finishes, and nine top-twelve finishes, while collecting more points than any other regular K&N West competitor. He was recognized at the NASCAR awards ceremony on December 13 at the NASCAR Hall of Fame in Charlotte, North Carolina.

==== 2015 season ====
Bickford opened his 2015 season on March 28 at Kern County Raceway Park in Bakersfield, California, finishing fourth. On May 5, 2015, he was announced as one of two drivers from the K&N Pro Series West invited to join NASCAR Next, NASCAR's elite development program, at a ceremony at the NASCAR Hall of Fame in Charlotte, North Carolina.

At Irwindale Speedway on April 11, a string of misfortunes—including stolen and slashed tires, loss of radio signal during practice, and suspension problems during the race—resulted in a 17th-place finish. His third race of the season, the NAPA Auto Parts Wildcat 150 at Tucson Speedway in Tucson, Arizona, ended in a sixth-place finish. He finished the season eighth in the series standings with 446 points.

=== Pacific Coast Challenge Series (2018) ===
In 2018, Bickford returned to racing, driving for Scott Family Racing in the Pacific Coast Challenge Series.

== Fundraising ==
=== Kids Golf Association (2009) ===
At the age of eleven, needing funds to move up from Quarter Midgets to Bandolero cars—expenses that included a HANS device (costing close to $1,000, first required following the 2003 death of Top Fuel Rookie of the Year Darrell Russell) and a Bandolero car (approximately $5,000)—Bickford organized a children's golf tournament called the Kids Golf Association ("KGA") at Vintner's Golf Club in Yountville, California.

Bickford arranged the event independently, with his parents stipulating that he do so without their assistance. He secured $100 hole sponsorships for each of the nine tee boxes and attracted 16 players, charging a $50 entry fee per player. The format was four-member teams playing 18 holes in a best-ball format. Sponsors included Jeff Gordon Motorsports, Bickford Precision, and Vintner's Golf Club, among others.

Bickford's own team won the tournament by one stroke with a four-over-par 72. Jason Boldt, General Manager of Vintner's Golf Club, described Bickford as "super professional the whole day around."

== Motorsports career results ==
=== NASCAR ===
Key
Color	Result
Gold	Winner
Silver	Finished 2nd–5th
Bronze	Finished 6th–10th
Green	Finished 11th–20th
Blue	Finished 21st or worse
Purple	Did not finish (DNF)
Black	Disqualified (DSQ)
Red	Did not qualify (DNQ)
Tan	Withdrew From Race (Wth)
White	Qualified for another driver (QL)
White	Qualified but replaced due to injury or incident (INQ)
White	Relieved another driver (RL)
Blank	Did not participate (DNP)
Blank	Excluded (EX)
Blank	Did not arrive (DNA)

(Bold – Pole position awarded by qualifying time. Italics – Pole position earned by points standings or practice time. * – Most laps led.)

==== NASCAR K&N Pro Series West ====
NASCAR K&N Pro Series West results
Year	Team	No.	Make	1	2	3	4	5	6	7	8	9	10	11	12	13	14	NKNPSWC	Pts	Ref
2014	Sunrise Ford Racing	6	Ford	PHO; 25	IRW; 15	S99; 10		KCR; 6	SON; 24	SLS; 1	CNS; 3		EVG; 4	KCR; 4	MMP; 3	AAS; 2	PHO; 30	5th	488	
2014	Sunrise Ford Racing	66	Ford				IOW; 4					IOW; 4						5th	488	
2015	Sunrise Ford Racing	6	Ford	KCR; 4	IRW; 17	TUS; 6	IOW; 10	SHA; 2	SON; 28	**SLS**; 1	IOW; 3	**EVG**; 8	CNS; 10	MER; 14	AAS; 23	PHO; 8		8th	446	
