= NAPA 150 (Columbus) =

NASCAR K&N Pro Series East
- Venue: Columbus Motor Speedway
- Corporate sponsor: NAPA
- First race: 2011
- Last race: 2016
- Distance: 150 miles (241.402 km)
- Laps: 150
- Previous names: JEGS 150 (2011–2012, 2014)

Circuit information
- Surface: Asphalt
- Length: 1/3 mi (0.54 km)
- Turns: 4

The NAPA 150 was a NASCAR K&N Pro Series East race held at Columbus Motor Speedway from 2011 to 2016. The race was discontinued after the speedway closed in 2016.

== History ==
The first NASCAR K&N Pro Series East race at Columbus was held in 2011, and Bubba Wallace won the inaugural event. The 2016 running was the last, as Columbus closed after the 2016 season.

== Past winners ==
Year	Date	No.	Driver	Team	Manufacturer	Race distance		Race time	Average speed (mph)
Year	Date	No.	Driver	Team	Manufacturer	Laps	Miles (km)	Race time	Average speed (mph)
2011	July 23	6	Bubba Wallace	Rev Racing	Toyota	150	150 (241.402)	0:54:50	54.657
2012	July 21	47	Cale Conley	Cale Conley Racing	Toyota	150	150 (241.402)	0:52:06	57.006
2013	July 13	6	Daniel Suárez	Rev Racing (2)	Toyota	152*	152 (244.62)	0:48:08	63.095
2014	July 19	4	Sergio Peña	Rev Racing (3)	Toyota	150	150 (241.402)	0:51:14	58.497
2015	July 4	98	Rico Abreu	HScott Motorsports	Chevrolet	150	150 (241.402)	0:50:39	59.171
2016	July 2	5	Justin Haley	HScott Motorsports (2)	Chevrolet	150	150 (241.402)	0:44:55	66.724
