= 2013 NASCAR K&N Pro Series East =

Motorsport season

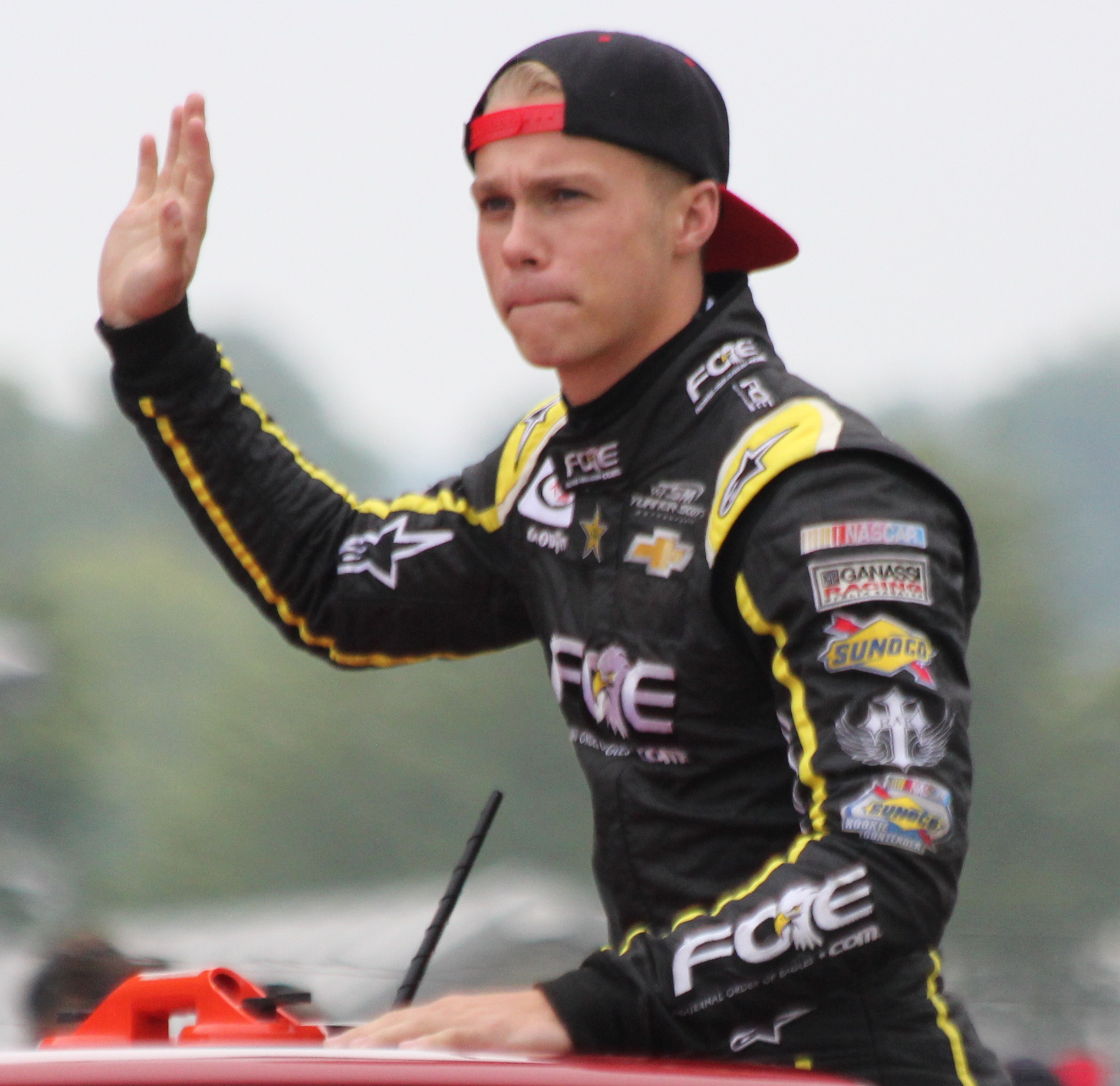
Dylan Kwasniewski, the 2013 K&N Pro Series East champion.

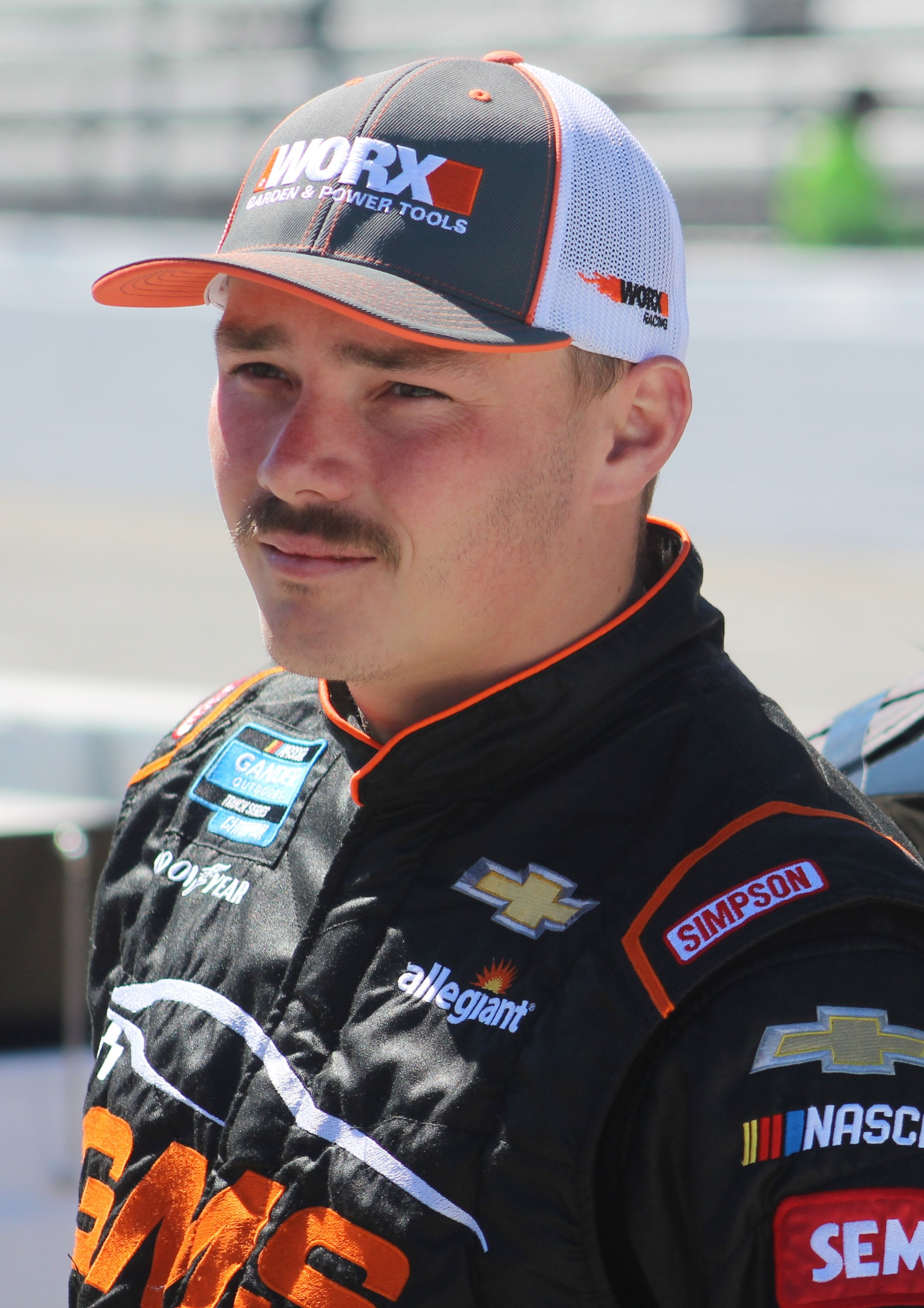
Brett Moffitt finished second behind Kwasniewski in the championship by 33 points.

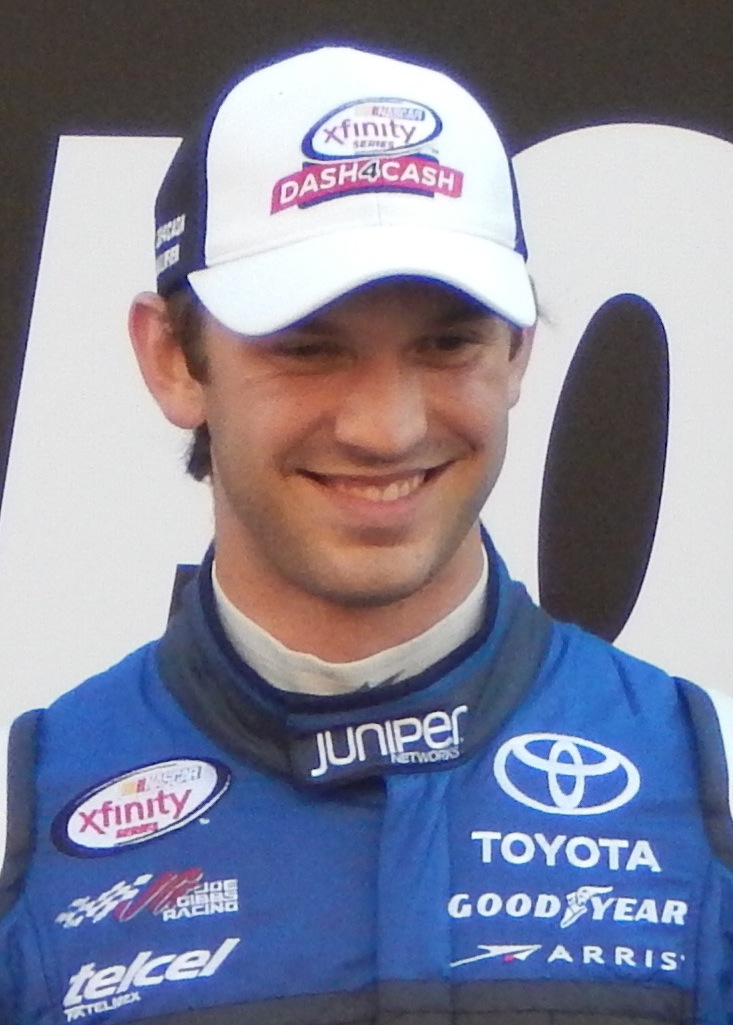
Daniel Suárez finished third in the championship.

The 2013 NASCAR K&N Pro Series East was the 27th season of the K&N Pro Series East. It began with the DRIVE4COPD 125 at Bristol Motor Speedway on March 17, and ended with the Road Atlanta 115 at Road Atlanta on October 18. Kyle Larson entered the season as the defending Drivers' Champion, but did not return the series as he moved to the NASCAR Nationwide Series full-time for Turner Scott Motorsports.

Dylan Kwasniewski won the championship after collecting five race wins during the season, along with eight top-fives and ten top-tens finishes. Kwasniewski finished 33 points ahead of his closest rival in the points standings, Brett Moffitt. Moffitt finished with five top-fives and ten top-ten finishes, but failed to win a race. Third place in the championship went to Daniel Suárez, who took one victory on the season. Cole Custer and Ben Kennedy collected two victories, while Brandon Gdovic, Ryan Gifford, Michael Self, and Austin Hill each collected a victory.

== Schedule ==
The UNOH Battle at the Beach was an exhibition race and did not count towards the championship.

No.	Race title	Track	Date
	UNOH Battle at the Beach (Note: The UNOH Battle at the Beach was an exhibition race at Daytona (short track) and was held as a combined event, with competitors from the K&N Pro Series East competing along with competitors for the K&N Pro Series West.)	Daytona International Speedway, Daytona Beach, Florida	February 19
1	DRIVE4COPD 125	Bristol Motor Speedway, Bristol, Tennessee	March 17
2	Kevin Whitaker Chevrolet 150 presented by G-Clean	Greenville-Pickens Speedway, Greenville, South Carolina	April 6
3	NAPA Auto Parts 150	Five Flags Speedway, Pensacola, Florida	April 13
4	Blue Ox 100	Richmond Raceway, Richmond, Virginia	April 25
5	NASCAR Hall of Fame 150	Bowman-Gray Stadium, Winston–Salem, North Carolina	June 1
6	Casey's General Store 150 (Note: The Casey's General Store 150 was held as a combined event, with competitors from the K&N Pro Series East competing along with competitors for the K&N Pro Series West. The race was run with a series-based point distribution, where drivers received points and statistical credit for their finish relative to other drivers in their series, not to the whole field in general.)	Iowa Speedway, Newton, Iowa	June 7
7	Visit Hampton VA 175	Langley Speedway, Hampton, Virginia	June 22
8	NAPA 150	Columbus Motor Speedway, Columbus, Ohio	July 13
9	Pork Be Inspired 150 (Note: The Pork Be Inspired 150 was held as a combined event, with competitors from the K&N Pro Series East competing along with competitors for the K&N Pro Series West. The race was run with a series-based point distribution, where drivers received points and statistical credit for their finish relative to other drivers in their series, not to the whole field in general.)	Iowa Speedway, Newton, Iowa	August 2
10	Biscuitville 125	Virginia International Raceway, Danville, Virginia	August 24
11	Kevin Whitaker Chevrolet 140	Greenville-Pickens Speedway, Greenville, South Carolina	September 2
12	North American Power 100	New Hampshire Motor Speedway, Loudon, New Hampshire	September 21
13	Drive Sober 150	Dover International Speedway, Dover, Delaware	September 27
14	Road Atlanta 115	Road Atlanta, Braselton, Georgia	October 18

== Results and standings ==
=== Races ===
No.	Race	Pole position	Most laps led	Winning driver	Manufacturer	No.	Winning team
	UNOH Battle at the Beach	Greg Pursley	Greg Pursley	Cameron Hayley	Ford	24	Gene Price Motorsports
1	DRIVE4COPD 125	Michael McGuire	Dylan Kwasniewski	Dylan Kwasniewski	Chevrolet	98	Turner Scott Motorsports
2	Kevin Whitaker Chevrolet 150	Brett Moffitt	Brett Moffitt	Brandon Gdovic	Toyota	46	Precision Performance Motorsports
3	NAPA Auto Parts 150	Ben Kennedy	Ben Kennedy	Ben Kennedy	Chevrolet	96	Ben Kennedy Racing
4	Blue Ox 100	Gray Gaulding	Gray Gaulding	Ryan Gifford	Toyota	2	Rev Racing
5	NASCAR Hall of Fame 150	Brett Moffitt	Brett Moffitt	Ben Kennedy	Chevrolet	96	Ben Kennedy Racing
6	Casey's General Store 150	Anderson Bowen	Michael Self	Michael Self	Chevrolet	21	Richard Childress Racing
7	Visit Hampton VA 175	Brett Moffitt	Dylan Kwasniewski	Dylan Kwasniewski	Chevrolet	98	Turner Scott Motorsports
8	NAPA 150	Dylan Kwasniewski	Daniel Suárez	Daniel Suárez	Toyota	6	Rev Racing
9	Pork Be Inspired 150	Cole Custer	Cole Custer	Cole Custer	Chevrolet	00	Ken Schrader Racing
10	Biscuitville 125	Dylan Kwasniewski	Dylan Kwasniewski	Dylan Kwasniewski	Chevrolet	98	Turner Scott Motorsports
11	Kevin Whitaker Chevrolet 140	Dylan Kwasniewski	Daniel Suárez	Dylan Kwasniewski	Chevrolet	98	Turner Scott Motorsports
12	North American Power 100	Cole Custer	Cole Custer	Cole Custer	Chevrolet	00	Ken Schrader Racing
13	Drive Sober 150	Cale Conley	C. J. Faison	Austin Hill	Ford	13	Austin Hill Racing
14	Road Atlanta 115	Dylan Kwasniewski	Dylan Kwasniewski	Dylan Kwasniewski	Chevrolet	98	Turner Scott Motorsports

=== Drivers' championship ===
(key) Bold - Pole position awarded by time. Italics - Pole position set by final practice results or rainout. * – Most laps led. ** – All laps led.

Pos	Driver	BRI	GRE	FIF	RCH	BGS	IOW	LGY	COL	IOW	VIR	GRE	NHA	DOV	RAL	Points
1	Dylan Kwasniewski	1*	15	7	13	2	2	1*	**3**	12	**1***	**1**	24	29	1*	536
2	Brett Moffitt	2	**5***	4	6*	**13***	3	20	7	9	3	9	7	11	24	503
3	Daniel Suárez	26	7	13	21	9	16	2	1*	3	18	2*	2	6	2	494
4	Ben Kennedy	10	17	**1****	14	1	12	7	9	14	4	10	26	12	6	488
5	Eddie MacDonald	7	8	15	4	12	15	9	6	2	9	4	23	15	18	473
6	Kenzie Ruston	11	3	5	19	4	41	12	8	7	12	8	20	13	11	459
7	Gray Gaulding	6	10	2	**24**	8	9	17	14	33	5	3	8	21	15	456
8	Cole Custer	24	19	22	3	10	6	23	15	**1****	19	16	**1***	14	5	452
9	Jesse Little	14	16	26	16	5	19	3	12	5	11	7	6	5	16	449
10	Brandon Gdovic	18	1	10	2	3	38	10	5	15	25	15	22	22	8	443
11	Ryan Gifford	3	13	9	1	15	33	5	4	8	21	19	25	28	22	429
12	Cale Conley	13	14	18	29	19	7	4	2	30	6	22	3	**17**	20	426
13	Mackena Bell	29	18	11	5	6	22	11	11	20	17	5	9	19	25	419
14	Bryan Ortiz	21	24	6	15	7	13	22	10	39	2	13	28	27	3	402
15	Austin Dyne	23	12	20	12	18	28	8	23	31	13	17	29	9	10	382
16	Matt Tifft	DNQ	26	16	10	17	10	6	16	34	15	12	13	16	23	378
17	Scott Heckert	20	20	17	28	20	24	15	17	27	8	18	11	23	7	376
18	Johnny VanDoorn			3	27	11	20	14	13	18			30			226
19	Ben Rhodes	9			35		5			10		6	4	26		217
20	Sam Hunt	32	6		18			13	21		20	11		18		213
21	C. J. Faison	5	11	14	11	14								24*		187
22	Austin Hill	16			7		37			24				1		160
23	Brandon Jones	31			36		11			29			12	7		151
24	Brandon McReynolds		9				36			13				4		134
25	Jimmy Weller III	8	21	19	17		40									130
26	Akinori Ogata					21	32			32			16	DNQ	21	128
27	Michael McGuire	**4**			8						16			25		124
28	Jeremy Burns		2		DNQ			16				14				109
29	Austin Wayne Self	12			9								19	DNQ		104
30	John Salemi	DNQ			DNQ			19	19				17	DNQ		99
31	Trey Hutchens							18					15	8		91
32	Sergio Peña			8										20	14	90
33	Dylan Presnell	35											5	10		82
34	Dale Quarterley										22			30	9	71
35	Ronnie Bassett Jr.											23	10	DNQ		68
36	Harrison Rhodes			23	22							20				67
37	Alex Kennedy										10				13	65
38	Anderson Bowen						**14**			23						61
39	Andrew Ranger										23				4	61
40	Enrique Contreras III	25	22	24												61
41	Chuck Buchanan Jr.	DNQ			DNQ			DNQ			24					60
42	Justin Boston	28												2		58
43	Anthony Giannone						23			19						57
44	Brodie Kostecki				25		42			35						55
45	Clay Campbell								18				18			52
46	Preston Peltier	17			20											51
47	Zak Hausler			21	34		DNQ									49
48	John Hunter Nemechek			12	30											46
49	Kyle Benjamin													3		42
50	Coleman Pressley		4													41
51	Jacob Wallace				26							21				41
52	Steven Legendre	15			33											40
53	Peyton Sellers										7					37
54	Corey LaJoie				31	22										35
55	Roddey Sterling														12	32
56	Nate Caruth	33	23													32
57	Robert Mitten										14					30
58	Brandon Watson												14			30
59	Clint King					16										28
60	Tomy Drissi														17	27
61	Rafael Vallina												27	DNQ		26
62	Tyler Reddick	19														25
63	Ryan Mathews														19	25
64	Grant Winchester								20							24
65	Daniel Graeff							21								23
66	Cory Joyce												21			23
67	Martin Roy	22														22
68	Eric Holmes						35		22	37						22
69	Josh Reaume				23											21
70	Duke Whiseant			25	DNQ											21
71	Jordan Anderson		25													19
72	Martin Jensen										26					18
73	Brandon Glover	30			DNQ											18
74	Ray Courtemanche Jr.	27														17
75	Cameron Hayley				32		8			6						12
76	Chad Finchum	34														10
77	Blake Jones	36														8
	Alx Danielsson	DNQ														
	Nathan Russell				DNQ											
	J. C. Stout													DNQ		
Drivers ineligible for K&N Pro Series East points
	Michael Self						1*			11						
	Greg Pursley						4			4						
	Derek Thorn						18			16						
	Giles Thornton						25			17						
	Daryl Harr						17			40						
	Dylan Lupton						26			21						
	Jamie Krzysik						21									
	Taylor Cuzick						30			22						
	Jack Sellers						34			25						
	John Wood						31			28						
	David Mayhew									36						
	Brett Thompson						39									

== See also ==
- 2013 NASCAR Sprint Cup Series
- 2013 NASCAR Nationwide Series
- 2013 NASCAR Camping World Truck Series
- 2013 ARCA Racing Series
- 2013 NASCAR K&N Pro Series West
- 2013 NASCAR Whelen Modified Tour
- 2013 NASCAR Whelen Southern Modified Tour
- 2013 NASCAR Canadian Tire Series
- 2013 NASCAR Toyota Series
- 2013 NASCAR Whelen Euro Series
