= Michael McGuire (racing driver) =

American racing driver

- Born: June 15, 1996 (age 30); Vinton, Virginia, U.S.

ARCA Menards Series East career
- 9 races run over 3 years
- Best finish: 27th (2013)
- First race: 2012 Widow Wax 125 Pres. by SealWrap Repair Tape (Bristol)
- Last race: 2014 Blue Ox 100 (Richmond)
Wins	Top tens	Poles
0	6	1
- Statistics up to date as of November 26, 2024.

Michael McGuire (born June 15, 1996) is an American former professional stock car racing driver who competed in the NASCAR K&N Pro Series East from 2012 to 2014.

McGuire has also competed in the Dirty Dozen Series, the Virginia Late Model Triple Crown Series, and the UARA STARS Late Model Series.

== Motorsports results ==
=== NASCAR ===
(key) (Bold - Pole position awarded by qualifying time. Italics - Pole position earned by points standings or practice time. * – Most laps led.)

==== K&N Pro Series East ====
NASCAR K&N Pro Series East results
Year	Team	No.	Make	1	2	3	4	5	6	7	8	9	10	11	12	13	14	15	16	NKNPSEC	Pts	Ref
2012	Tim McGuire	7	Toyota	BRI; 8	GRE	RCH; 10	IOW	BGS	JFC	LGY	CNB	COL	IOW	NHA; 10	DOV	GRE	CAR			30th	104	
2013	Tim McGuire	7	Toyota	**BRI**; 4	GRE	FIF	RCH; 8	BGS	IOW	LGY	COL	IOW								27th	124	
2013	Rick Ware Racing	51	Chevy										VIR; 16	GRE	NHA					27th	124	
2013	Rick Ware Racing	51	Toyota													DOV; 25	RAL			27th	124	
2014	Tim McGuire	7	Toyota	NSM	DAY	BRI; 10	GRE	RCH; 29	IOW	BGS	FIF	LGY	NHA	COL	IOW	GLN	VIR	GRE	DOV	46th	49	
