= 2012 NASCAR K&N Pro Series East =

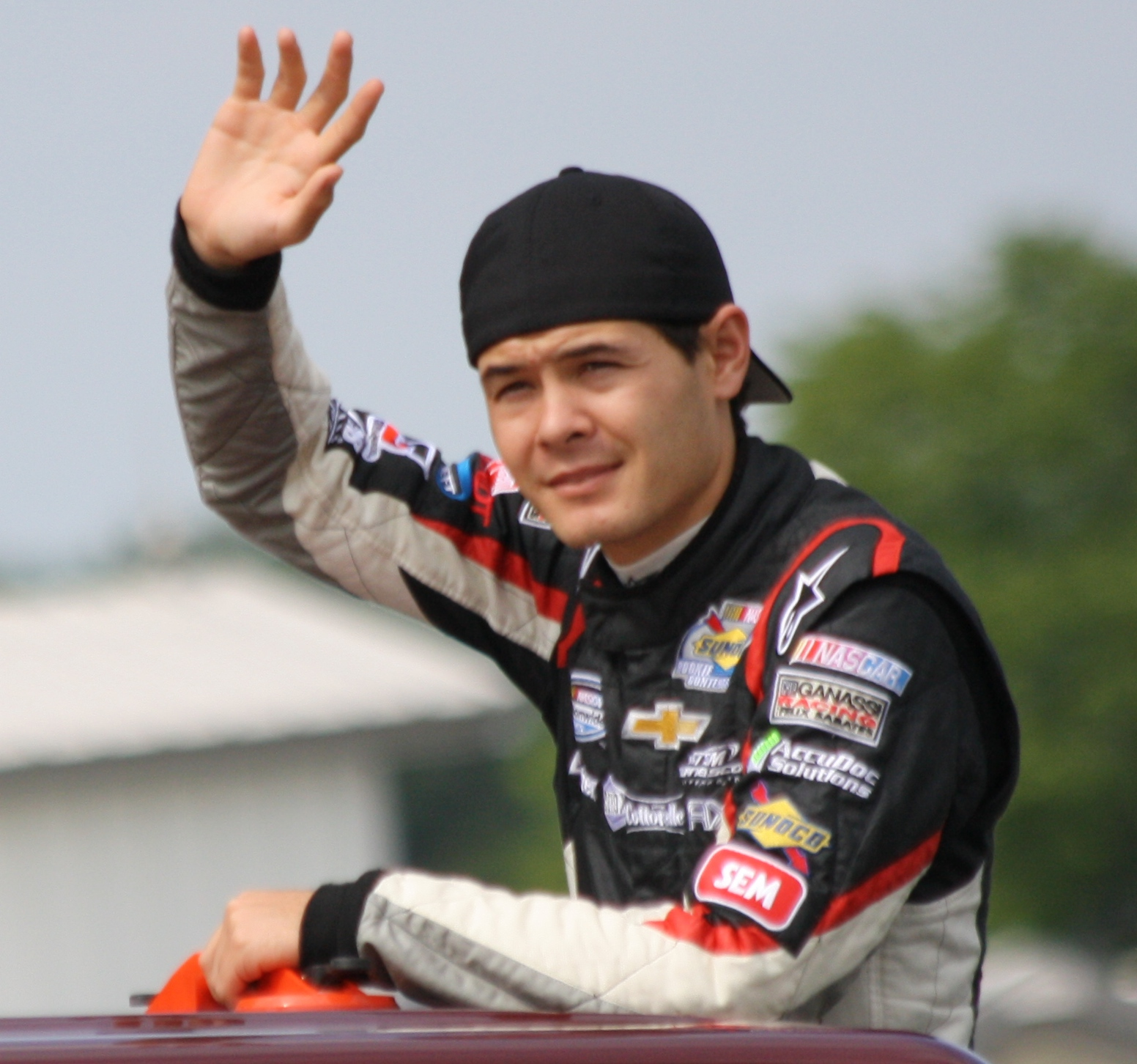
Kyle Larson, the 2012 K&N Pro Series East champion.

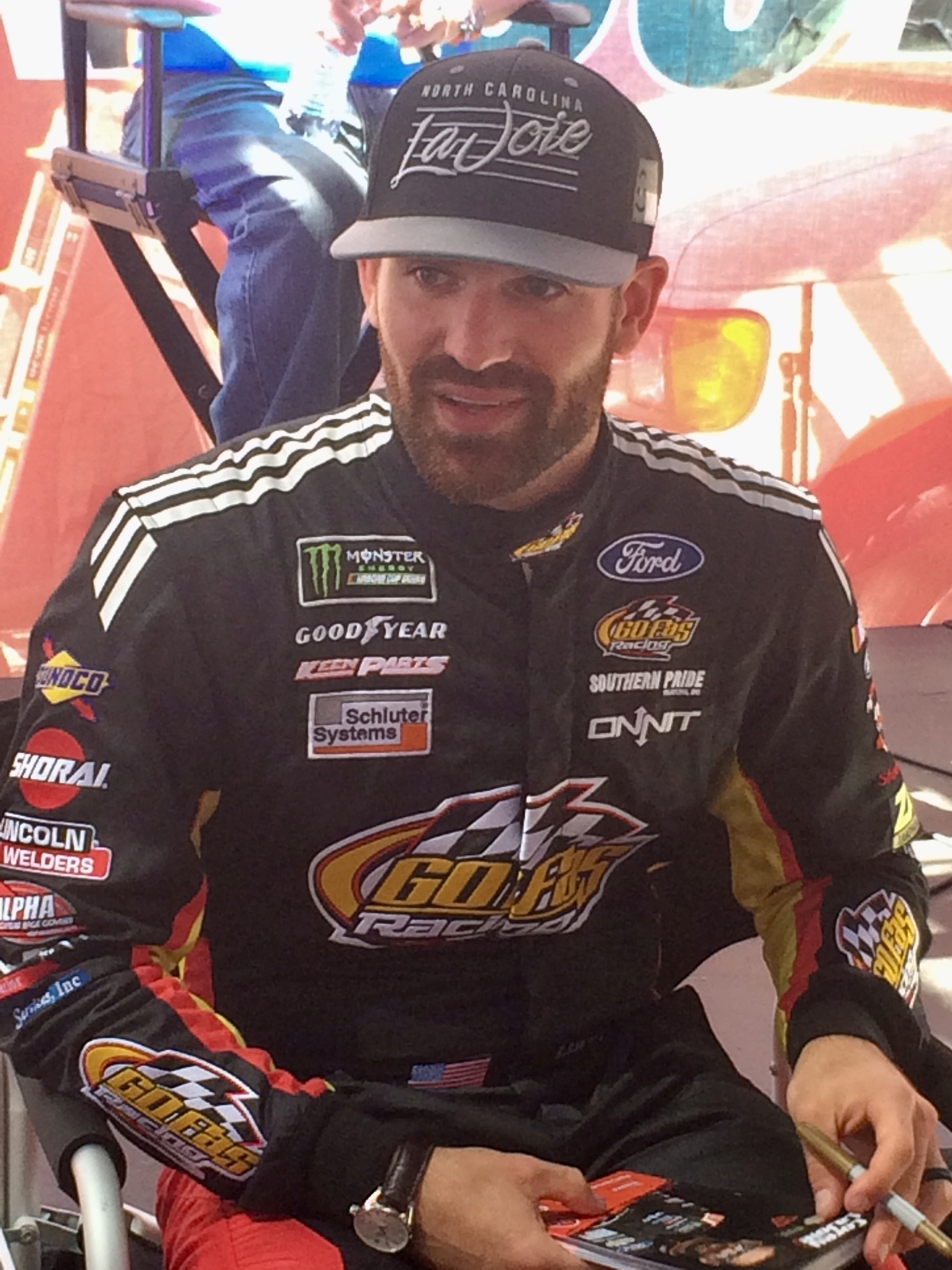
Corey LaJoie finished second behind Larson in the championship by 14 points.

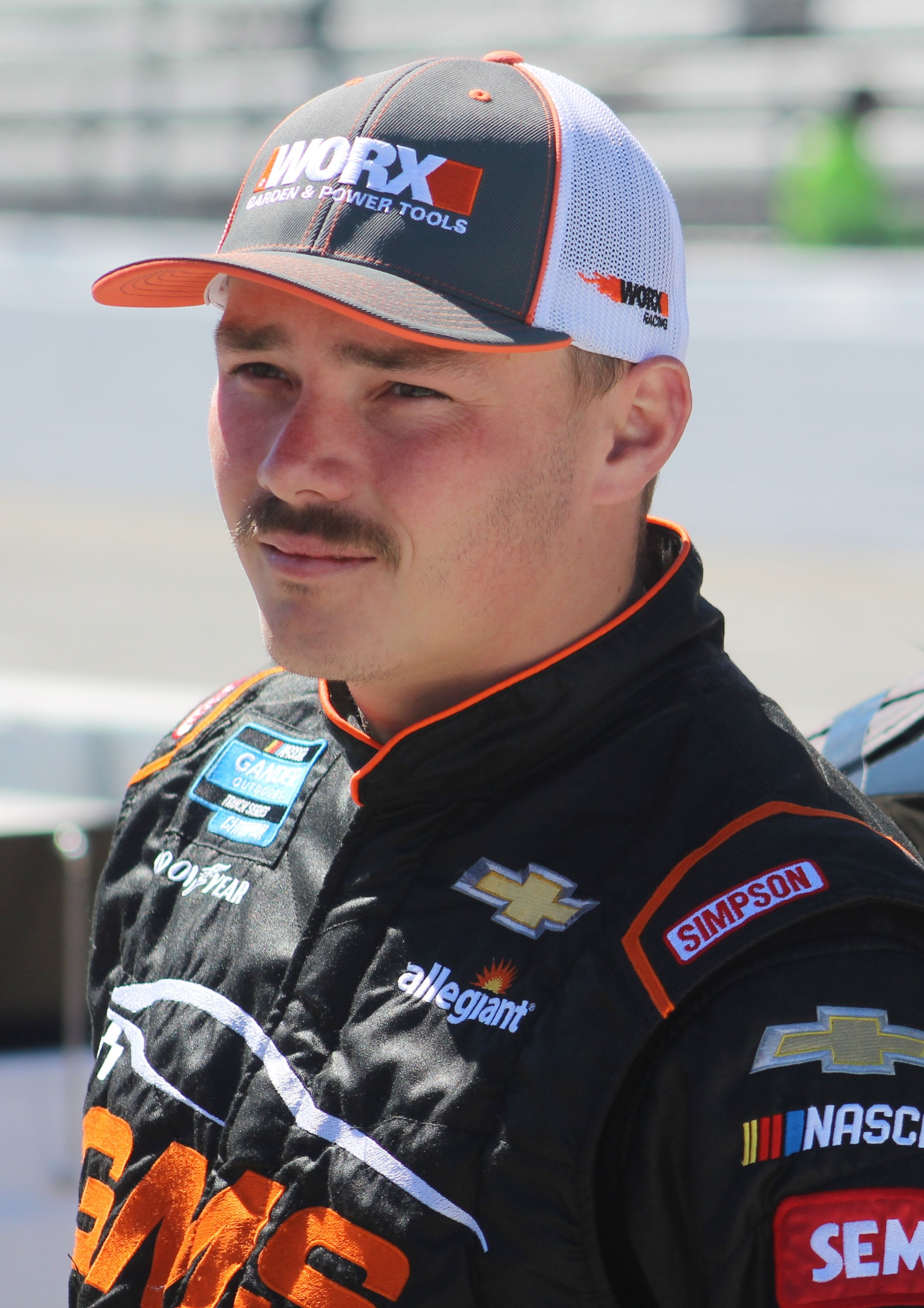
Brett Moffitt finished third in the championship.

The 2012 NASCAR K&N Pro Series East was the 26th season of the K&N Pro Series East. It began with the Widow Wax 125 presented by SealWrap Repair Tape at Bristol Motor Speedway on March 17, and ended with the Classic 3 Championship at Rockingham Speedway on November 3. Max Gresham entered the season as the defending Drivers' Champion.

Kyle Larson won the championship after earning 2 victories during the season, along with 8 top fives and 12 top tens. Larson finished just 14 points ahead of his closest rival in the points standings, Corey LaJoie. LaJoie finished with 5 victories on the season, along with 10 top fives and 10 top tens. Third place in the championship went to Brett Moffitt, who took two victories on the season. Nelson Piquet Jr., Bubba Wallace, Chase Elliott, Cale Conley, and Tyler Reddick each collected a victory.

== Schedule ==
No.	Race title	Track	Location	Date
1	Widow Wax 125 presented by SealWrap Repair Tape	Bristol Motor Speedway	Bristol, Tennessee	March 17
2	Kevin Whitaker Chevrolet 150	Greenville-Pickens Speedway	Greenville, South Carolina	March 31
3	Blue Ox 100	Richmond Raceway	Richmond, Virginia	April 26
4	Graham Tire 150 (Note: The Graham Tire 150 was held as a combined event, with competitors from the K&N Pro Series East competing along with competitors for the K&N Pro Series West. The race was run with a series-based point distribution, where drivers received points and statistical credit for their finish relative to other drivers in their series, not to the whole field in general.)	Iowa Speedway	Newton, Iowa	May 19
5	NASCAR Hall of Fame 150	Bowman Gray Stadium	Winston-Salem, North Carolina	June 2
6	Slack Auto Parts 150	Gresham Motorsports Park	Jefferson, Georgia	June 9
7	Visit Hampton VA 175	Langley Speedway	Hampton, Virginia	June 23
8	Samuel 150	CNB Bank Raceway Park	Clearfield, Pennsylvania	July 14
9	JEGS 150	Columbus Motor Speedway	Columbus, Ohio	July 21
10	Pork Be Inspired 150 (Note: The Pork Be Inspired 150 was held as a combined event, with competitors from the K&N Pro Series East competing along with competitors for the K&N Pro Series West. The race was run with a series-based point distribution, where drivers received points and statistical credit for their finish relative to other drivers in their series, not to the whole field in general.)	Iowa Speedway	Newton, Iowa	August 3
11	G-Oil 100	New Hampshire Motor Speedway	Loudon, New Hampshire	September 22
12	American Real TV 150	Dover International Speedway	Dover, Delaware	September 28
13	Kevin Whitaker Chevrolet 140	Greenville-Pickens Speedway	Greenville, South Carolina	October 27
14	Classic 3 Championship	Rockingham Speedway	Rockingham, North Carolina	November 3

== Results and standings ==
=== Races ===
No.	Race	Pole position	Most laps led	Winning driver	Manufacturer	No.	Winning team
1	Widow Wax 125 presented by SealWrap Repair Tape	Nelson Piquet Jr.	Nelson Piquet Jr.	Nelson Piquet Jr.	Toyota	14	X-Team Racing
2	Kevin Whitaker Chevrolet 150	Bubba Wallace	Bubba Wallace	Bubba Wallace	Toyota	18	Joe Gibbs Racing
3	Blue Ox 100	Brett Moffitt	Brett Moffitt	Brett Moffitt	Toyota	11	Hattori Racing Enterprises
4	Graham Tire 150	Brett Moffitt	Brett Moffitt	Chase Elliott	Chevrolet	9	Hendrick Motorsports
5	NASCAR Hall of Fame 150	Kyle Larson	Corey LaJoie	Corey LaJoie	Ford	07	Randy LaJoie Racing
6	Slack Auto Parts 150	Cale Conley	Cale Conley	Kyle Larson	Toyota	6	Rev Racing
7	Visit Hampton VA 175	Chase Elliott	Brett Moffitt	Corey LaJoie	Ford	07	Randy LaJoie Racing
8	Samuel 150	Brett Moffitt	Brett Moffitt	Brett Moffitt	Toyota	11	Hattori Racing Enterprises
9	JEGS 150	Ben Kennedy	Cale Conley	Cale Conley	Toyota	47	Conley Motorsports
10	Pork Be Inspired 150	Cale Conley	Corey LaJoie	Corey LaJoie	Ford	07	Randy LaJoie Racing
11	G-Oil 100	Brett Moffitt	Brett Moffitt	Kyle Larson	Toyota	6	Rev Racing
12	American Real TV 150	Bubba Wallace	Bubba Wallace, Brett Moffitt	Corey LaJoie	Toyota	07	Randy LaJoie Racing
13	Kevin Whitaker Chevrolet 140	Brett Moffitt	Brett Moffitt	Corey LaJoie	Ford	07	Randy LaJoie Racing
14	Classic 3 Championship	C. J. Faison	Bubba Wallace	Tyler Reddick	Dodge	98	Curb Racing

=== Drivers' championship ===
(key) Bold - Pole position awarded by time. Italics - Pole position set by final practice results or rainout. * – Most laps led. ** – All laps led.

Pos	Driver	BRI	GRE	RCH	IOW	BGS	JEF	LGY	CNB	COL	IOW	NHA	DOV	GRE	CAR	Points
1	Kyle Larson	9	17	4	6	**5**	1	7	2	21	2	1	5	4	6	536
2	Corey LaJoie	22	2	3	18	1*	4	1	23	17	1*	2	1	1	2	522
3	Brett Moffitt	32	4	**1***	**5***	9	3	2*	**1***	2	5	**16**	18*	8*	21	512
4	Chase Elliott	10	6	2	1	6	14	**3**	15	15	4	5	27	2	12	500
5	Bryan Ortiz	14	11	7	12	3	27	6	5	6	14	6	6	6	13	484
6	Eddie MacDonald	28	5	8	10	10	8	9	6	10	8	8	11	10	10	477
7	Bubba Wallace	18	1*	28	36	2	7	16	22	3	13	3	**2***	13	3*	470
8	Brandon Gdovic	21	3	5	11	7	20	4	7	9	25	13	10	5	15	470
9	Ben Kennedy	6	9	6	23	8	5	21	3	**7**	28	25	4	16	9	456
10	Sergio Peña	20	29	9	7	19	6	6	17	4	3	24	12	9	8	444
11	Ryan Gifford	3	13	21	21	18	28	18	4	13	33	12	15	12	7	413
12	Jimmy Weller III	13	22	12	27	13	16	12	19	8	16	11	8	21	14	412
13	Sam Hunt	24	14	25	35	15	12	13	18	11	24	20	19	7	26	370
14	Jorge Arteaga	30	25	15	DNQ	11	23	10	13	22	11	30	23	17	27	333
15	Dylan Presnell	23	8	18	19	21	21	11			32	29	9		28	279
16	Daniel Suárez	15	10	29	16	22	19			5	10	15				259
17	Travis Pastrana	12	20	23	4	14		8			6	7		23		258
18	C. J. Faison	27	15	24	26		10				21	26	7		**11**	240
19	Cale Conley		28		3		**2***			1**	**7**	35	24	24	25	235
20	Jesse Little			11	22		17					23	22	3	5	210
21	Andrew Smith	4	24	13	32		9				DNQ		26	22		205
22	Carlos Iaconelli	25	19	33	31	12	11			19		31				179
23	Ryan Blaney	2		22	2						34		25			146
24	Dale Quarterley	19	21	32		20						9	21			142
25	Harrison Rhodes					4		19	8			33			22	134
26	Clay Campbell						26		12	12		21	16			133
27	Chad Boat	34	26	31	14		29				17					118
28	Enrique Contreras III			16			24					14		11		111
29	John Salemi	26		26					11			18	28			111
30	Michael McGuire	8		10								10				104
31	Dylan Kwasniewski		7		8^{1}		18				27^{1}	4				103
32	Chad Finchum	7	12	36			25									96
33	Ali Jackson							15		14		DNQ		20		89
34	Akinori Ogata						15	20			31	36				84
35	Jacob Wallace		16					14	21							81
36	Scott Saunders	16	18	19												79
37	Nelson Piquet Jr.	**1***		17												75
38	Larry Barford Jr.												17	19	24	72
39	Rafael Vallina			27			13					DNQ			29	70
40	Derek Ramstrom	5		14												69
41	Jorge Contreras Jr.	35		30		16					DNQ					69
42	Travis Miller				20						15					59
43	Jeff Anton											17	14			57
44	Austin Hill									18				15		55
45	Nick Sweet											22	13			53
46	Chuck Buchanan Jr.			34					20			DNQ			30	48
47	Tyler Reddick														1	47
48	Stephen Nasse			20			22									46
49	Steven Legendre											27		25	16	45
50	Spencer Gallagher	17										28				43
51	Coleman Pressley														4	40
52	Tim Bell									16		34				38
53	Hector Aguirre											32	20			36
54	Blake Jones	29	23													36
55	Benny Gordon								9							35
56	Tim Bainey Jr.								10							34
57	David Mayhew	11			34^{1}						19^{1}					33
58	Jason Bowles				15											32
59	Nathan Russell								14							30
60	Brandon Jones													14		30
61	Grant Winchester								16							28
62	Sean Caisse					17										27
63	Kenny Forbes							17								27
64	Tim George Jr.														17	27
65	Jason Hathaway													18		26
66	Frank Deiny Jr.														18	26
67	Duarte Ferreira		27	35												26
68	Alex Kennedy				23											25
69	Austin Theriault											19				25
70	Jack Clarke														19	25
71	Xavi Raso									20						24
72	Matt DiBenedetto										30					24
73	Noel Dowler														20	24
74	Rick Gdovic							22								22
75	Beto Montiero														23	21
76	Brandon McReynolds												3			17
77	Ray Courtemanche Jr.	31														13
78	Candace Munzy	33														11
79	Dylan Hutchison				DNQ											
80	Jack Sellers				DNQ											
81	Taylor Cuzick				DNQ											
82	Ron Jay				DNQ											
83	Josh Reaume				DNQ											
84	Chris Evans				DNQ											
85	John Wood				DNQ						DNQ					
86	Brett Thompson				DNQ						DNQ					
87	Chase Miller										DNQ					
88	Éric Hélary											DNQ				
Drivers ineligible for K&N Pro Series East points
89	Michael Self				17						9					
90	Greg Pursley				9						20					
91	Cameron Hayley				25						12					
92	Jonathon Gomez				13						23					
93	Eric Holmes				33						18					
94	Ryan Philpott				DNQ						22					
95	Derek Thorn				24						29					
96	Carl Harr				DNQ						26					
97	Daryl Harr				28						DNQ					
98	Austin Dyne				29						36					
99	Brennan Newberry										35					
Pos	Driver	BRI	GRE	RCH	IOW	BGS	JEF	LGY	CNB	COL	IOW	NHA	DOV	GRE	CAR	Points

Notes

- ^{1} – Scored points towards the K&N Pro Series West.

== See also ==
- 2012 NASCAR Sprint Cup Series
- 2012 NASCAR Nationwide Series
- 2012 NASCAR Camping World Truck Series
- 2012 ARCA Racing Series
- 2012 NASCAR Whelen Modified Tour
- 2012 NASCAR Whelen Southern Modified Tour
- 2012 NASCAR Canadian Tire Series
- 2012 NASCAR Toyota Series
- 2012 NASCAR Stock V6 Series
- 2012 Racecar Euro Series
