= Zachary Bruenger =

American racing driver

- Born: April 11, 1990 (age 36); Quincy, Illinois, U.S.

NASCAR O'Reilly Auto Parts Series career
- 1 race run over 1 year
- 2015 position: NA
- First race: 2015 U.S. Cellular 250 Presented by New Holland (Iowa)
| Wins | Top tens | Poles |
|---|---|---|
| 0 | 0 | 0 |

Zachary Bruenger (born April 11, 1990) is an American professional stock car racing driver. He last competed part-time in the NASCAR Xfinity Series, driving the No. 79 for Means Racing.

== Motorsports career results ==
=== NASCAR ===
(key) (Bold – Pole position awarded by qualifying time. Italics – Pole position earned by points standings or practice time. * – Most laps led.)

==== Xfinity Series ====
NASCAR Xfinity Series results
| Year | Team | No. | Make | 1 | 2 | 3 | 4 | 5 | 6 | 7 | 8 | 9 | 10 | 11 | 12 | 13 | 14 | 15 | 16 | 17 | 18 | 19 | 20 | 21 | 22 | 23 | 24 | 25 | 26 | 27 | 28 | 29 | 30 | 31 | 32 | 33 | NXSC | Pts | Ref |
|---|---|---|---|---|---|---|---|---|---|---|---|---|---|---|---|---|---|---|---|---|---|---|---|---|---|---|---|---|---|---|---|---|---|---|---|---|---|---|---|
| 2015 | Means Racing | 79 | Chevy | DAY | ATL | LVS | PHO | CAL | TEX | BRI | RCH | TAL | IOW | CLT | DOV | MCH | CHI | DAY | KEN | NHA | IND | IOW; 38 | GLN | MOH | BRI | ROA | DAR | RCH | CHI | KEN | DOV | CLT | KAN | TEX | PHO | HOM | NA | - | |

==== K&N Pro Series East ====
NASCAR K&N Pro Series East results
| Year | Team | No. | Make | 1 | 2 | 3 | 4 | 5 | 6 | 7 | 8 | 9 | 10 | 11 | 12 | 13 | 14 | 15 | 16 | NKPSEC | Pts | Ref |
|---|---|---|---|---|---|---|---|---|---|---|---|---|---|---|---|---|---|---|---|---|---|---|
| 2014 | Ric Bruenger | 54 | Chevy | NSM | DAY | BRI; DNQ | GRE; 15 | RCH | IOW | BGS | FIF | LGY | NHA | COL | | | | | | 43rd | 56 | |
| 2014 | Ric Bruenger | 55 | Chevy | | | | | | | | | | | | IOW; 24 | GLN | VIR | GRE | DOV | 43rd | 56 | |

=== CARS Late Model Stock Car Tour ===
(key) (Bold – Pole position awarded by qualifying time. Italics – Pole position earned by points standings or practice time. * – Most laps led. ** – All laps led.)

CARS Late Model Stock Car Tour results
| Year | Team | No. | Make | 1 | 2 | 3 | 4 | 5 | 6 | 7 | 8 | 9 | 10 | 11 | 12 | CLMSCTC | Pts | Ref |
|---|---|---|---|---|---|---|---|---|---|---|---|---|---|---|---|---|---|---|
| 2018 | N/A | 55 | N/A | TCM | MYB | ROU | HCY | BRI | ACE | CCS | KPT | HCY; DNS | WKS | ROU | SBO | 87th | 2 | |

=== IHRA Late Model Sportsman Series ===
(key) (Bold – Pole position awarded by qualifying time. Italics – Pole position earned by points standings or practice time. * – Most laps led. ** – All laps led.)

IHRA Late Model Sportsman Series
| Year | Team | No. | Make | 1 | 2 | 3 | ISCSS | Pts | Ref |
|---|---|---|---|---|---|---|---|---|---|
| 2026 | Darrick Coomer | 9 | N/A | DUB | CDL | AND; 15 | N/A | 0 | |
