= Dylan Presnell =

American racing driver (born 1995)

- Born: May 22, 1995 (age 31); Sevierville, Tennessee, U.S.

ARCA Menards Series East career
- 21 races run over 4 years
- Best finish: 15th (2012)
- First race: 2011 Slack Auto Parts 150 (Jefferson)
- Last race: 2014 Drive Sober 150 (Dover)
Wins	Top tens	Poles
0	1	0

ARCA Menards Series West career
- 1 race run over 1 year
- Best finish: 86th (2011)
- First race: 2011 Casino Arizona 125 (Phoenix)
Wins	Top tens	Poles
0	0	0
- Statistics up to date as of November 26, 2024.

Dylan Presnell (born May 22, 1995) is an American former professional stock car racing driver who has competed in the NASCAR K&N Pro Series East and the NASCAR K&N Pro Series West.

Presnell has also previously competed in series such as the PASS National Championship Super Late Model Series, the X-1R Pro Cup Series, the UARA STARS Late Model Series, and the Allison Legacy Race Series.

== Motorsports results ==
=== NASCAR ===
(key) (Bold - Pole position awarded by qualifying time. Italics - Pole position earned by points standings or practice time. * – Most laps led.)

==== K&N Pro Series East ====
NASCAR K&N Pro Series East results
Year	Team	No.	Make	1	2	3	4	5	6	7	8	9	10	11	12	13	14	15	16	NKNPSEC	Pts	Ref
2011	Laerte Zatta	14	Toyota	GRE	SBO	RCH	IOW	BGS	JFC; 8	LGY										26th	816	
2011	Hattori Racing Enterprises	14	Toyota								NHA; 11	COL; 8	GRE; 7	NHA; 15	DOV; 9					26th	816	
2012	Coulter Motorsports	26	Toyota	BRI; 23				BGS; 21	JFC; 21	LGY; 11	CNB	COL		NHA; 29	DOV; 9	GRE	CAR; 28			15th	279	
2012	Coulter Motorsports	26	Chevy		GRE; 8	RCH; 18														15th	279	
2012	Coulter Motorsports	83	Toyota				IOW; 15						IOW; 22							15th	279	
2013	Kenneth Presnell	26	Toyota	BRI; 35	GRE	FIF	RCH	BGS	IOW	LGY	COL	IOW	VIR	GRE		DOV; 10	RAL			33rd	82	
2013	Kenneth Presnell	26	Chevy												NHA; 5					33rd	82	
2014	Kenneth Presnell	26	Toyota	NSM	DAY	BRI; Wth	GRE	RCH	IOW	BGS	FIF	LGY	NHA	COL	IOW	GLN	VIR	GRE	DOV; 10	49th	42	

==== K&N Pro Series West ====
NASCAR K&N Pro Series West results
Year	Team	No.	Make	1	2	3	4	5	6	7	8	9	10	11	12	13	14	NKNPSWC	Pts	Ref
2011	Kenneth Presnell	50	Toyota	PHO	AAS	MMP	IOW	LVS	SON	IRW	EVG	PIR	CNS	MRP	SPO	AAS	PHO; 24	86th	91	
