= Visit Hampton VA 150 =

Visit Hampton Virginia 150
NASCAR K&N Pro Series East
- Venue: Langley Speedway
- Location: Hampton, Virginia; United States
- Corporate sponsor: Visit Hampton Virginia
- First race: 2011
- Last race: 2018
- Distance: 59.4 miles (95.595 km)
- Laps: 150
- Previous names: Visit Hampton Virginia 175 (2011–2015)

Circuit information
- Surface: Asphalt
- Length: 0.395 mi (0.636 km)
- Turns: 4

The Visit Hampton Virginia 150 was a NASCAR K&N Pro Series East race held annually at Langley Speedway in Hampton, Virginia.

== Past winners ==
Year	Date	No.	Driver	Team	Manufacturer	Race distance		Race time	Average speed (mph)
Year	Date	No.	Driver	Team	Manufacturer	Laps	Miles (km)	Race time	Average speed (mph)
2011	June 11	4	Sergio Peña	Rev Racing	Toyota	175	69.4 (111.527)	1:03:24	65.284
2012	June 23	07	Corey LaJoie	Randy LaJoie Racing	Ford	175	69.4 (111.527)	1:09:28	59.428
2013	June 22	98	Dylan Kwasniewski	Turner Scott Motorsports	Chevrolet	177*	70 (112.654)	1:16:48	54.579
2014	June 21	41	Ben Rhodes	Turner Scott Motorsports (2)	Chevrolet (2)	175	69.4 (112.654)	1:01:25	67.701
2015	June 20	9	William Byron	HScott Motorsports	Chevrolet (3)	175	69.4 (112.654)	0:58:43	70.815
2016	Not held								
2017	September 4*	16	Todd Gilliland	Bill McAnally Racing	Toyota (2)	150	59.4 (95.595)	0:59:12	69.609
2018	April 28	54	Tyler Dippel	DGR-Crosley	Toyota (3)	150	59.4 (95.595)	0:50:12	70.817

- 2013: Race extended to a green-white-checker finish.
- 2017: Race postponed from Saturday, September 2 to Monday, September 4 due to rain.
