= Jeremy Burns =

American racing driver

- Born: April 15, 1989 (age 37); Simpsonville, South Carolina, U.S.

ARCA Menards Series East career
- 7 races run over 3 years
- Best finish: 28th (2013)
- First race: 2013 Kevin Whitaker Chevrolet 150 Pres. by G-Clean (Greenville-Pickens)
- Last race: 2015 Kevin Whitaker Chevrolet 150 (Greenville-Pickens)
Wins	Top tens	Poles
0	2	0
- Statistics up to date as of November 26, 2024.

Jeremy Burns (born April 15, 1989) is an American professional stock car racing driver who competed in the NASCAR K&N Pro Series East from 2013 to 2015.

Burns has also previously competed in the CARS Late Model Stock Tour, the Virginia Late Model Triple Crown Series, and the UARA STARS Late Model Series.

== Motorsports results ==
=== NASCAR ===
(key) (Bold - Pole position awarded by qualifying time. Italics - Pole position earned by points standings or practice time. * – Most laps led.)

==== K&N Pro Series East ====
NASCAR K&N Pro Series East results
Year	Team	No.	Make	1	2	3	4	5	6	7	8	9	10	11	12	13	14	15	16	NKNPSEC	Pts	Ref
2013	Michael Burns	81	Toyota	BRI	GRE; 2	FIF	RCH; DNQ	BGS	IOW	LGY; 16	COL	IOW	VIR	GRE; 14	NHA	DOV	RAL			28th	109	
2014	Michael Burns	81	Chevy	NSM	DAY	BRI; 28	GRE	RCH; 9	IOW	BGS	FIF	LGY	NHA; 19	COL	IOW	GLN	VIR	GRE	DOV	35th	76	
2015	Michael Burns	81	Chevy	NSM	GRE; 11	BRI	IOW	BGS	LGY	COL	NHA	IOW	GLN	MOT	VIR	RCH	DOV			49th	33	

=== CARS Late Model Stock Car Tour ===
(key) (Bold – Pole position awarded by qualifying time. Italics – Pole position earned by points standings or practice time. * – Most laps led. ** – All laps led.)

CARS Late Model Stock Car Tour results
Year	Team	No.	Make	1	2	3	4	5	6	7	8	9	10	11	12	13	14	15	CLMSCTC	Pts	Ref
2016	Burns Racing	5B	N/A	SNM	ROU	HCY	TCM	GRE; 8	ROU	CON	MYB	HCY	SNM						40th	25	
2019	Mike Burns	81	Ford	SNM	HCY	ROU	ACE	MMS	LGY	DOM	CCS	HCY; 27	ROU	SBO					67th	6	
2020	Lee McCall	41	N/A	SNM	ACE	HCY	HCY	DOM	FCS	LGY	CCS	FLO	GRE; DNQ						64th	2	
2025	Mitchell Mote Performance	74	N/A	AAS	WCS	CDL	OCS	ACE	NWS	LGY	DOM	CRW	HCY	AND; 26	FLC	SBO	TCM	NWS	92nd	16	
