= Johnny VanDoorn =

American racing driver (born 1988)

- Born: April 4, 1988 (age 38); Coopersville, Michigan, U.S.

ARCA Menards Series East career
- 8 races run over 1 year
- Best finish: 18th (2013)
- First race: 2013 NAPA Auto Parts 150 (Pensacola)
- Last race: 2013 North American Power 100 (Loudon)
| Wins | Top tens | Poles |
|---|---|---|
| 0 | 1 | 0 |
- Statistics up to date as of November 26, 2024.

Johnny VanDoorn (born April 4, 1988) is an American professional stock car racing driver who competed in the NASCAR K&N Pro Series East in 2013, where he drove the No. 1 for Dave Davis, getting a best finish of third in his debut at Five Flags Speedway. He is a multi-time champion of the ASA CRA Super Series, where he won the championship in 2009, 2010, and 2012, and has won 23 races between 2006 and 2020. He is also a former participant in the Road to Daytona program.

VanDoorn has also competed in series such as the ASA Southern Super Series, the ASA Midwest Tour, the CRA JEGS All-Stars Tour, and the ARCA Late Model Gold Cup Series.

== Motorsports results ==
=== NASCAR ===
(key) (Bold - Pole position awarded by qualifying time. Italics - Pole position earned by points standings or practice time. * – Most laps led.)

==== K&N Pro Series East ====
NASCAR K&N Pro Series East results
| Year | Team | No. | Make | 1 | 2 | 3 | 4 | 5 | 6 | 7 | 8 | 9 | 10 | 11 | 12 | 13 | 14 | NKNPSEC | Pts | Ref |
|---|---|---|---|---|---|---|---|---|---|---|---|---|---|---|---|---|---|---|---|---|
| 2013 | Dave Davis | 1 | Dodge | BRI | GRE | PEN; 3 | RCH; 27 | | | | | | | | | | | 18th | 226 | |
| 2013 | Dave Davis | 1 | Chevy | | | | | BGS; 11 | IOW; 15 | LGY; 14 | COL; 13 | IOW; 13 | VIR | GRE | NHA; 30 | DOV | RAL | 18th | 226 | |

=== CARS Super Late Model Tour ===
(key)

CARS Super Late Model Tour results
| Year | Team | No. | Make | 1 | 2 | 3 | 4 | 5 | 6 | 7 | 8 | 9 | CSLMTC | Pts | Ref |
|---|---|---|---|---|---|---|---|---|---|---|---|---|---|---|---|
| 2018 | N/A | 71 | Chevy | MYB | NSH; 3 | ROU | HCY | BRI | AND | HCY | ROU | SBO | N/A | 0 | |
| 2019 | N/A | 71 | Chevy | SNM | HCY | NSH; 4 | MMS | BRI | HCY | ROU | SBO | | N/A | 0 | |
