= Brandon Gdovic =

American racing driver (born 1992)

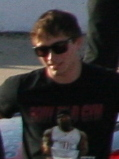
- Gdovic at Richmond International Raceway in 2013
- Born: Brandon R. Gdovic; February 28, 1992 (age 34); Pittsburgh, Pennsylvania, U.S.
- Achievements: 2015 Lamborghini Super Trofeo Champion

NASCAR O'Reilly Auto Parts Series career
- 16 races run over 4 years
- 2021 position: 41st
- Best finish: 37th (2016)
- First race: 2015 O'Reilly Auto Parts 300 (Texas)
- Last race: 2021 Food City 300 (Bristol)
Wins	Top tens	Poles
0	1	0
- Statistics up to date as of December 25, 2021.

Brandon R. Gdovic (born February 28, 1992) is an American professional racing driver. The Yorktown, Virginia resident competes in the Lamborghini Super Trofeo North America series, driving for Precision Performance Motorsports. He has also raced in the NASCAR Xfinity Series, ARCA Racing Series, NASCAR K&N Pro Series East, NASCAR Whelen Euro Series, and WeatherTech SportsCar Championship.

== Racing career ==
=== ARCA Racing Series ===
Gdovic has two career starts in the ARCA Racing Series, running two races in 2014 for Cunningham Motorsports. He finished on the lead lap both times, and recorded an eighth-place finish at Kansas Speedway.

=== K&N Pro Series East ===
Gdovic first tried his hand at K&N Pro Series East competition in 2011, running 11 of the series 14 races. Running for his father and with funding from Aquis Communication, he scored one top five finish (New Hampshire) and three other top tens on the way to a 15th-place points finish. Gdovic failed to finish only two races.

In 2012, Gdovic ran the entire season, recorded a career-best third-place finish at Greenville-Pickens Speedway, other top fives at Richmond International Raceway, Langley Speedway, and Greensville-Pickens, and recorded top-tens in all but five races. With only one crash on the season, he finished seventh in season points.

2013 led to Gdovic's first win, at Greensville-Pickens. He also recorded a second at Richmond and a third at Bowman Gray Stadium, but three engine failures in a fourteen race season dropped Gdovic to tenth in series points. The team scaled back to part-time in 2014, with only one top ten finish and three crashes in eight races. While focusing on the Lamborghini Super Trofeo series in 2015, Gdovic made only one start, a 12th at Virginia International Raceway. Moving up to the Xfinity Series in 2016, Gdovic made a start while sharing his family ride with other drivers. He finished 16th at Mobile International Speedway.

=== Xfinity Series ===
Gdovic made his Xfinity Series debut in the O'Reilly Auto Parts 300 at Texas Motor Speedway on April 10, 2015, in the No. 55 Chevrolet Camaro for Viva Motorsports. He qualified 29th and finished 26th, four laps down. Gdovic would make two more starts in 2015 one for Viva Motorsports, at Richmond International Raceway, in which he finished 30th, and one for Precision Performance Motorsports who purchased Viva Motorsports equipment, at Watkins Glen International, where he finished 13th.

On April 16, 2016, Gdovic made his first Xfinity start of the year in the first-ever Xfinity heat/main event, the Fitzgerald Glider Kits 300 at Bristol. He finished 14th in his heat and 18th in the main. He attempted four more races during the course of the season, finishing 21st twice and bringing sponsorship from Verizon Wireless.

Gdovic had plans to run full-time in the No. 46 Precision Performance Motorsports Chevrolet, a ride he shared part-time in 2016 with Anthony Kumpen and Jordan Anderson. However, the team did not attempt a race.

After not running any Xfinity Series races from 2017 to 2019, Gdovic announced a return to the series for the 2020 race at the Indianapolis Motor Speedway infield road course with Sam Hunt Racing.

=== Sports cars ===
==== Lamborghini Super Trofeo Series ====
After originally being introduced to sports car racing in a 2015 Lamborghini test with Mitchum Motorsports at Virginia International Raceway, Gdovic captured the Lamborghini Super Trofeo North American Series championship later that year. He also experimented in the NASCAR Whelen Euro Series that year. The following year, Gdovic moved up to the Huracan Super Trofeo Series and won three times on his way to a second-place points finish. In 2017, he earned an invite to a Lamborghini training camp in hopes of becoming a factory driver. Gdovic ran the 2017 24 Hours of Daytona with DAC Motorsports as part of the Huracan schedule. He ran the Dubai 24 Hour while in the country for the TCR Middle East Series. In 2017, Gdovic partnered with co-driver Todd C. Snyder for the 2017 Super Trofeo North America Season driving with DAC Motorsports In 2018, Gdovic continued in Super Trofeo with co-driver Shinya Michimi, winning at Road America and finishing fourth in points. Gdovic teamed with Conor Daly for the 2019 Super Trofeo North America season. The pairing won their first race together at Barber Motorsports Park. Gdovic won his first Super Trofeo North America race of 2020 at Virginia International Raceway in August.

=== TCR Middle East Series ===
Gdovic was the only American in the 2017 TCR Middle East Series, driving a Volkswagen Golf for Liqui Moly Team Engstler. Gdovic won in the first weekend of racing, which was held at the Dubai Autodrome. He came up a narrow second in the standings to Josh Files but helped his team to the Teams' Classification Championship.

== Personal life ==
Gdovic lent equipment to fellow K&N Pro Series competitor Ronnie Bassett Jr. in 2016 after Bassett's shop burned down.

== Motorsports career results ==
=== NASCAR ===
(key) (Bold – Pole position awarded by qualifying time. Italics – Pole position earned by points standings or practice time. * – Most laps led.)

==== Xfinity Series ====
NASCAR Xfinity Series results
Year	Team	No.	Make	1	2	3	4	5	6	7	8	9	10	11	12	13	14	15	16	17	18	19	20	21	22	23	24	25	26	27	28	29	30	31	32	33	NXSC	Pts	Ref
2015	Viva Motorsports	55	Chevy	DAY	ATL	LVS	PHO	CAL	TEX; 26	BRI	RCH; 30	TAL	IOW	CLT	DOV	MCH	CHI	DAY	KEN	NHA	IND	IOW															48th	63	
2015	Precision Performance Motorsports	55	Chevy																				GLN; 13	MOH	BRI	ROA	DAR	RCH	CHI	KEN	DOV	CLT	KAN	TEX	PHO	HOM	48th	63	
2016	Precision Performance Motorsports	46	Chevy	DAY	ATL	LVS	PHO	CAL	TEX	BRI; 18	RCH	TAL	DOV	CLT	POC; 26	MCH	IOW	DAY	KEN	NHA	IND; 27	IOW	GLN	MOH	BRI; 21	ROA	DAR	RCH	CHI	KEN	DOV	CLT	KAN	TEX	PHO; 21	HOM	37th	92	
2020	Sam Hunt Racing	26	Toyota	DAY	LVS	CAL	PHO	DAR	CLT	BRI	ATL	HOM	HOM	TAL	POC	IRC; 12	KEN	KEN	TEX	KAN	ROA	DRC; 28	DOV	DOV	DAY	DAR	RCH	RCH	BRI	LVS	TAL	ROV	KAN	TEX	MAR	PHO	57th	34	
2021	Sam Hunt Racing	26	Toyota	DAY; 8	DRC	HOM	LVS	PHO	ATL	MAR; 17	TAL	DAR; 36	DOV	COA	CLT; QL^{†}	MOH	TEX; 23	NSH	POC	ROA	ATL	NHA; 16	GLN	IRC	MCH	DAY	DAR	RCH	BRI; 21	LVS	TAL	ROV	TEX	KAN	MAR	PHO	41st	101	
^{†} – Qualified but replaced by Grant Enfinger

==== K&N Pro Series East ====
NASCAR K&N Pro Series East results
Year	Team	No.	Make	1	2	3	4	5	6	7	8	9	10	11	12	13	14	15	16	NKNPSEC	Pts	Ref
2011	Precision Performance Motorsports	46	Dodge	GRE; 27	SBO; 11	RCH; 18	IOW; 9	BGS; 17	JFC; 28	LGY; 24	NHA; 4	COL	GRE; 8	NHA; 9	DOV; 11					15th	1311	
2012	Precision Performance Motorsports	46	Dodge	BRI; 21			IOW; 9	BGS; 7												8th	470	
2012	Precision Performance Motorsports	46	Toyota		GRE; 3	RCH; 5			JFC; 20	LGY; 4	CNB; 7	COL; 9	IOW; 18	NHA; 13	DOV; 10	GRE; 5	CAR; 15			8th	470	
2013	Precision Performance Motorsports	46	Toyota	BRI; 18	GRE; 1	FIF; 10	RCH; 2	BGS; 3	IOW; 24	LGY; 10	COL; 5	IOW; 12	VIR; 25	GRE; 15	NHA; 22	DOV; 22	RAL; 8			10th	443	
2014	Precision Performance Motorsports	46	Toyota	NSM; 9	DAY; 11	BRI; 25	GRE	RCH; 19	IOW	BGS	FIF		NHA; 29	COL	IOW	GLN	VIR; 15	GRE	DOV; 11	21st	216	
2014	Precision Performance Motorsports	64	Toyota									LGY; 17								21st	216	
2015	Precision Performance Motorsports	12	Toyota	NSM	GRE	BRI	IOW	BGS	LGY	COL	NHA	IOW	GLN	MOT	VIR; 12	RCH	DOV			50th	32	
2016	Precision Performance Motorsports	46	Toyota	NSM	MOB; 16	GRE	BRI	VIR	DOM	STA	COL	NHA	IOW	GLN	GRE	NJM	DOV			53rd	28	

==== Whelen Euro Series – Elite 1 ====
NASCAR Whelen Euro Series – Elite 1 results
Year	Team	No.	Make	1	2	3	4	5	6	7	8	9	10	11	12	NWESC	Pts	Ref
2015	Precision Performance Motorsports	46	Chevy	VAL	VAL	VEN	VEN	BRH	BRH	TOU	TOU	UMB; 18	UMB; 8	ZOL	ZOL	25th	124	
2016	PK Carsport	46	Chevy	VAL; 20	VAL; 25	VEN	VEN	BRH	BRH	TOU	TOU	ADR	ADR	ZOL	ZOL	20th	262	

==== Whelen Euro Series – Elite 2 ====
NASCAR Whelen Euro Series – Elite 2 results
Year	Team	No.	Make	1	2	3	4	5	6	7	8	9	10	11	12	NWESC	Pts	Ref
2015	Precision Performance Motorsports	46	Chevy	VAL	VAL	VEN	VEN	BRH	BRH	TOU	TOU	UMB; 4	UMB; 4	ZOL	ZOL	24th	160	

^{*} Season still in progress
^{1} Ineligible for series points

=== ARCA Racing Series ===
(key) (Bold – Pole position awarded by qualifying time. Italics – Pole position earned by points standings or practice time. * – Most laps led.)

ARCA Racing Series results
Year	Team	No.	Make	1	2	3	4	5	6	7	8	9	10	11	12	13	14	15	16	17	18	19	20	ARSC	Pts	Ref
2014	Cunningham Motorsports	72	Dodge	DAY	MOB	SLM	TAL	TOL	NJE	POC	MCH	ELK	WIN	CHI	IRP	POC	BLN	ISF	MAD	DSF	SLM	KEN; 15	KAN; 8	52nd	345	

=== WeatherTech SportsCar Championship ===
(key)

==== 24 Hours of Daytona ====
24 Hours of Daytona results
Year	Class	No	Team	Car	Co-drivers	Laps	Position	Class Pos.
2016	PC	38	(United States) Performance Tech Motorsports	ORECA FLM09	(United States) James French (United States) Jim Norman (United States) Josh Norman (Canada) Kyle Marcelli	385	45 ^{DNF}	6 ^{DNF}
