= Coleman Pressley =

American racing driver

- Born: Coleman C. Pressley; October 10, 1988 (age 38); Asheville, North Carolina, U.S.
- Achievements: 2010 UARA-Stars Champion

NASCAR O'Reilly Auto Parts Series career
- 12 races run over 2 years
- Best finish: 57th (2010)
- First race: 2009 U.S. Cellular 250 (Iowa)
- Last race: 2010 Wypall 200 (Phoenix)
Wins	Top tens	Poles
0	0	0
- Statistics up to date as of November 19, 2012.

Coleman C. Pressley (born October 10, 1988) is an American former professional stock car racing driver. He is the current spotter of the No. 22 Ford Mustang Dark Horse driven by Joey Logano in the NASCAR Cup Series. He is also the son of former NASCAR Cup driver Robert Pressley and the grandson of Bob Pressley. He was a Fox Sports (United States) broadcast commentator for the NASCAR Xfinity Series from 2019-2024. He won the UARA Stars Championship in 2010.

== Early career ==
Coleman began racing in karts as a six-year-old. He then raced Bandoleros at Lowes Motor Speedway. Pressley raced in legends cars before taking a year off. In 2005, he began racing late models at Hickory Motor Speedway. He had four second-place finishes to finish sixth in season points. In 2006, he continued racing at Hickory with additional events at other tracks. He scored his first late model victory in the second race of the season at Hickory. With the victory, he began the youngest driver to win in the track's 55-year history. He is the cousin of former North Carolina Tar Heels quarterback and current Barstool Sports blogger Caleb Pressley.

== NASCAR career ==
Pressley's first race in the Nationwide Series in the No. 47 JTG Daugherty Racing at the Iowa Speedway and finished 41st. He raced for R3 Motorsports part-time in the Nationwide Series. As of June 7, 2010, his best finish was a 12th-place effort at Nashville Superspeedway, driving the No. 88 JR Motorsports Chevrolet. He spent the rest of the season racing part-time in the No. 23 car.

After ending his driving career, Pressley became a spotter, starting in 2015. His first job was spotting for A. J. Allmendinger, who was driving for JTG Daugherty Racing. In 2019, he was named Brad Keselowski's spotter. In 2020, he became the spotter for the No. 22 car and Joey Logano.

== Motorsports career results ==
=== NASCAR ===
(key) (Bold – Pole position awarded by qualifying time. Italics – Pole position earned by points standings or practice time. * – Most laps led.)

==== Nationwide Series ====
NASCAR Nationwide Series results
Year	Team	No.	Make	1	2	3	4	5	6	7	8	9	10	11	12	13	14	15	16	17	18	19	20	21	22	23	24	25	26	27	28	29	30	31	32	33	34	35	NNSC	Pts	Ref
2009	JTG Daugherty Racing	47	Toyota	DAY	CAL	LVS	BRI	TEX	NSH	PHO	TAL	RCH	DAR	CLT	DOV	NSH	KEN	MLW	NHA	DAY	CHI	GTY	IRP	IOW; 41	GLN	MCH	BRI; 39	CGV	ATL	RCH; 41	DOV; 41	KAN	CAL	CLT	MEM; 38	TEX	PHO	HOM	93rd	215	
2010	R3 Motorsports	23	Chevy	DAY	CAL	LVS	BRI; 31	NSH	PHO	TEX	TAL	RCH; 18	DAR; 15	DOV	CLT															RCH; 25	DOV	KAN	CAL	CLT	GTY	TEX	PHO; 17	HOM	57th	733	
2010	JR Motorsports	88	Chevy													NSH; 12	KEN; 18	ROA	NHA	DAY	CHI	GTY	IRP	IOW	GLN	MCH	BRI	CGV	ATL										57th	733	

==== K&N Pro Series East ====
NASCAR K&N Pro Series East results
Year	Team	No.	Make	1	2	3	4	5	6	7	8	9	10	11	12	13	14	NKNPSEC	Pts	Ref
2011	X Team Racing	14	Toyota	GRE; 2	SBO; 4	RCH; 11	IOW; 5	**BGS**; 22		**LGY**; 7	NHA	COL	GRE	NHA	DOV			21st	948	
2011	X Team Racing	59	Toyota						JFC; 26									21st	948	
2012	X Team Racing	15	Toyota	BRI	GRE	RCH	IOW	BGS	JFC	LGY	CNB	COL	IOW	NHA	DOV	GRE	CAR; 4	51st	40	
2013	X Team Racing	15	Toyota	BRI	GRE; 4	FIF	RCH	BGS	IOW	LGY	COL	IOW	VIR	GRE	NHA	DOV	RAL	50th	41	
