= Clay Campbell (racing driver) =

American racing driver

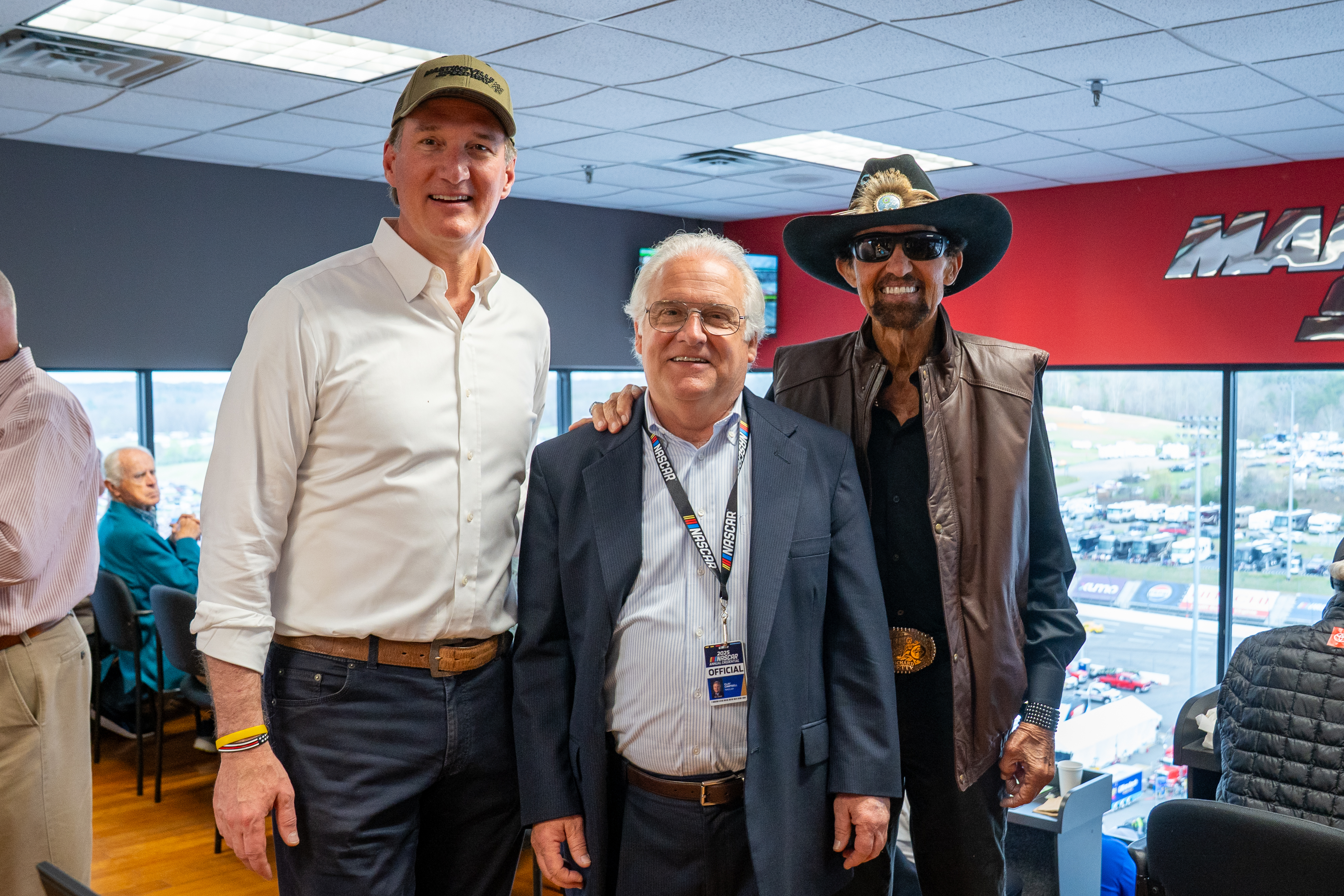
- Campbell (center) in 2025.
- Born: February 7, 1960 (age 66); Martinsville, Virginia, U.S.

ARCA Menards Series career
- 7 races run over 4 years
- Best finish: 57th (2014)
- First race: 2012 International Motorsports Hall of Fame 250 (Talladega)
- Last race: 2015 International Motorsports Hall of Fame 200 (Talladega
Wins	Top tens	Poles
0	1	0

ARCA Menards Series East career
- 16 races run over 3 years
- Best finish: 20th (2011)
- First race: 2011 South Boston 150 (South Boston)
- Last race: 2013 North American Power 100 (New Hampshire)
Wins	Top tens	Poles
0	0	0
- Statistics up to date as of February 11, 2025.

Clay Campbell (born February 7, 1960) is an American former professional stock car racing driver who has competed in the ARCA Racing Series and the NASCAR K&N Pro Series East. He also serves as the track president of Martinsville Speedway, a position he has held since 1988.

Campbell has also previously competed in the Allison Legacy Series.

== Motorsports results ==
=== NASCAR ===
(key) (Bold - Pole position awarded by qualifying time. Italics - Pole position earned by points standings or practice time. * – Most laps led.)

==== K&N Pro Series East ====
NASCAR K&N Pro Series East results
Year	Team	No.	Make	1	2	3	4	5	6	7	8	9	10	11	12	13	14	NKNPSEC	Pts	Ref
2011	Spraker Racing Enterprises	08	Chevy	GRE; DNQ	SBO; 13	RCH; 26	IOW	BGS; 25	JFC; 21	LGY; 22	NHA; 26	COL; 16	GRE	NHA; 24				20th	1031	
2011	Spraker Racing Enterprises	37	Chevy												DOV; 19			20th	1031	
2012	Spraker Racing Enterprises	08	Chevy	BRI	GRE	RCH	IOW	BGS	JFC; 26	LGY								26th	133	
2012	Spraker Racing Enterprises	37	Chevy								CNB; 12	COL; 12	IOW	NHA; 21	DOV; 16	GRE	CAR	26th	133	
2013	Spraker Racing Enterprises	37	Chevy	BRI	GRE	FIF	RCH	BGS	IOW	LGY	COL; 18	IOW	VIR	GRE	NHA; 18	DOV	RAL	45th	52	

=== ARCA Racing Series ===
(key) (Bold – Pole position awarded by qualifying time. Italics – Pole position earned by points standings or practice time. * – Most laps led.)

ARCA Racing Series results
Year	Team	No.	Make	1	2	3	4	5	6	7	8	9	10	11	12	13	14	15	16	17	18	19	20	21	ARSC	Pts	Ref
2012	Spraker Racing Enterprises	08	Ford	DAY	MOB	SLM	TAL; 26	TOL	ELK	POC	MCH	WIN	NJE	IOW	CHI	IRP	POC	BLN	ISF	MAD	SLM	DSF	KAN		125th	100	
2013	Spraker Racing Enterprises	08	Ford	DAY; 14	MOB	SLM	TAL; 28	TOL	ELK	POC	MCH	ROA	WIN	CHI	NJM	POC	BLN	ISF	MAD	DSF	IOW	SLM	KEN	KAN	88th	250	
2014	Ken Schrader Racing	52	Chevy	DAY; 3	MOB	SLM	TAL; 29	TOL	NJE	POC	MCH	ELK	WIN	CHI	IRP	POC	BLN	ISF	MAD	DSF	SLM	KEN	KAN		57th	300	
2015	Ken Schrader Racing	52	Chevy	DAY; 35	MOB	NSH	SLM	TAL; 30	TOL	NJE	POC	MCH	CHI	WIN	IOW	IRP	POC	BLN	ISF	DSF	SLM	KEN	KAN		109th	135	
