= Rusty Skewes =

American racing driver (born 1949)

- Born: October 14, 1949 (age 77); Bluefield, Virginia, U.S.

ARCA Menards Series East career
- 1 race run over 1 year
- Best finish: 69th (2014)
- First race: 2014 New Smyrna 150 presented by JEGS (New Smyrna)
Wins	Top tens	Poles
0	0	0
- Statistics up to date as of April 9, 2026.

William "Rusty" Skewes (born October 14, 1949) is an American professional stock car racing driver who has competed in the NASCAR K&N Pro Series East and the CARS Pro Late Model Tour.

Skewes has also competed in series such as the SMART Modified Tour, the Dirty Dozen Series, the World Series of Asphalt Stock Car Racing, and the NASCAR Weekly Series.

== Motorsports results ==
=== NASCAR ===
(key) (Bold - Pole position awarded by qualifying time. Italics - Pole position earned by points standings or practice time. * – Most laps led.)

==== K&N Pro Series East ====
NASCAR K&N Pro Series East results
Year	Team	No.	Make	1	2	3	4	5	6	7	8	9	10	11	12	13	14	15	16	NKNPSEC	Pts	Ref
2014	Rusty Skewes	51	Chevy	NSM; 29	DAY	BRI	GRE	RCH	IOW	BGS	FIF	LGY	NHA	COL	IOW	GLN	VIR	GRE	DOV	69th	15	

=== CARS Late Model Stock Car Tour ===
(key) (Bold – Pole position awarded by qualifying time. Italics – Pole position earned by points standings or practice time. * – Most laps led. ** – All laps led.)

CARS Late Model Stock Car Tour results
Year	Team	No.	Make	1	2	3	4	5	6	7	8	9	10	11	12	13	CLMSCTC	Pts	Ref
2015	Lee Pulliam	51	Ford	SNM	ROU	HCY	SNM	TCM	MMS; 24	ROU; 8	CON	MYB	HCY				36th	34	
2021	Edwards Racing Enterprises	8S	Chevy	DIL	HCY	ROU	ACE	CRW	LGY	DOM; 17	HCY	MMS; 21	TCM	FLC	WKS	SBO	35th	28	

=== CARS Pro Late Model Tour ===
(key)

CARS Pro Late Model Tour results
Year	Team	No.	Make	1	2	3	4	5	6	7	8	9	10	11	12	13	CPLMTC	Pts	Ref
2022	Edwards Racing Enterprises	8	Chevy	CRW	HCY	GPS	FCS	TCM; 14	HCY; 12	ACE; 8	MMS; 16	TCM; 15	ACE; 7	SBO; 10	CRW; 9		8th	173	
2023	Edwards Racing Enterprises	8	Chevy	SNM; 17	HCY; 16	ACE; 15	NWS; 30	TCM; 18	DIL; DNQ	CRW; 14	WKS; 9	HCY; 13	TCM; 11	SBO; 16	TCM; 18	CRW; 11	8th	207	

=== SMART Modified Tour ===
SMART Modified Tour results
Year	Car owner	No.	Make	1	2	3	4	5	6	7	8	9	10	11	12	SMTC	Pts	Ref
2021	N/A	07VA	N/A	CRW	FLO	SBO	FCS	CRW	DIL	CAR	CRW	DOM; 9	PUL; 22	HCY		38th	22	
2021	N/A	07	N/A												ACE; 12	38th	22	
