= Giles Thornton =

American racing driver (born 1998)

- Born: April 7, 1998 (age 28); Whitefish, Montana, U.S.

ARCA Menards Series East career
- 1 race run over 1 year
- Best finish: 59th (2014)
- First race: 2014 Granite State 100 (Loudon)
| Wins | Top tens | Poles |
|---|---|---|
| 0 | 1 | 0 |

ARCA Menards Series West career
- 21 races run over 2 years
- Best finish: 9th (2013)
- First race: 2013 G-Oil 150 (Stockton)
- Last race: 2014 Casino Arizona 100 (Phoenix)
| Wins | Top tens | Poles |
|---|---|---|
| 0 | 8 | 0 |
- Statistics up to date as of November 25, 2024.

Giles Thornton (born April 7, 1998) is an American former professional stock car racing driver who has competed in the NASCAR K&N Pro Series East and the NASCAR K&N Pro Series West. He is also the youngest driver to compete in the NASCAR Whelen Euro Series, having made his debut in the series in 2013 at the age of fifteen years and 90 days.

Thornton has also previously competed in series such as the Southeast Limited Late Model Series, the Inland Northwest Super Stock Association, and the Western Speed Association Championship Series.

== Motorsports results ==
=== NASCAR ===
(key) (Bold - Pole position awarded by qualifying time. Italics - Pole position earned by points standings or practice time. * – Most laps led.)

==== K&N Pro Series East ====
NASCAR K&N Pro Series East results
| Year | Team | No. | Make | 1 | 2 | 3 | 4 | 5 | 6 | 7 | 8 | 9 | 10 | 11 | 12 | 13 | 14 | 15 | 16 | NKNPSEC | Pts | Ref |
|---|---|---|---|---|---|---|---|---|---|---|---|---|---|---|---|---|---|---|---|---|---|---|
| 2014 | TTC Racing | 12 | Ford | NSM | DAY | BRI | GRE | RCH | IOW | BGS | FIF | LGY | NHA; 18 | COL | IOW | GLN | VIR | GRE | DOV | 59th | 26 | |

==== K&N Pro Series West ====
NASCAR K&N Pro Series West results
| Year | Team | No. | Make | 1 | 2 | 3 | 4 | 5 | 6 | 7 | 8 | 9 | 10 | 11 | 12 | 13 | 14 | 15 | NKNPSWC | Pts | Ref |
|---|---|---|---|---|---|---|---|---|---|---|---|---|---|---|---|---|---|---|---|---|---|
| 2013 | TTC Racing | 12 | Toyota | PHO | S99; 7 | BIR; 13 | IOW; 7 | L44; 12 | SON; 24 | CNS; 4 | IOW; 5 | EVG; 13 | SRP; 4 | MMP; 17 | SMP; 15 | AAS; 13 | KCR; 25 | PHO; 24 | 9th | 433 | |
| 2014 | TTC Racing | 12 | Toyota | PHO; 7 | IRW; 6 | | IOW; 11 | KCR; 7 | SON | SLS | CNS | IOW | EVG; 5 | KCR | MMP | AAS | | | 13th | 245 | |
| 2014 | TTC Racing | 12 | Ford | | | S99; 3 | | | | | | | | | | | PHO; 24 | | 13th | 245 | |

==== Whelen Euro Series - Elite 1 ====
NASCAR Whelen Euro Series - Elite 1 results
| Year | Team | No. | Make | 1 | 2 | 3 | 4 | 5 | 6 | 7 | 8 | 9 | 10 | 11 | 12 | NWES | Pts | Ref |
|---|---|---|---|---|---|---|---|---|---|---|---|---|---|---|---|---|---|---|
| 2013 | Scorpus Racing | 9 | Chevy | NOG | NOG | DIJ | DIJ | BRH | BRH | TOU; 14 | TOU; 23 | MNZ | MNZ | BUG | BUG | 43rd | 48 | |
