= 2021 Cook Out 250 =

Race details
- Race 7 of 33 in the 2021 NASCAR Xfinity Series season
- Date: April 9, 2021
- Location: Martinsville Speedway in Martinsville, Virginia
- Course: Permanent racing facility
- Course length: 0.526 miles (0.85 km)
- Distance: 250 laps, 131.50 mi (211.63 km)
- Average speed: 59.758 mph

Pole position
Driver	Harrison Burton	Joe Gibbs Racing
- Grid positions set by competition-based formula

Most laps led
Driver	Josh Berry	JR Motorsports
- Laps: 95

Winner
No. 8	Josh Berry	JR Motorsports

Television in the United States
- Network: FS1
- Announcers: Adam Alexander, Ryan Blaney, and Austin Dillon

The 2021 Cook Out 250 was a NASCAR Xfinity Series race held on April 9, 2021. It was contested over 250 laps on the 0.526-mile (0.847 km) oval. It was the seventh race of the 2021 NASCAR Xfinity Series season. JR Motorsports driver Josh Berry, running part-time, collected his first career Xfinity series win.

== Report ==
=== Background ===
Martinsville Speedway is a NASCAR-owned stock car racing track located in Henry County, in Ridgeway, Virginia, just to the south of Martinsville. At 0.526 miles (0.847 km) in length, it is the shortest track in the NASCAR Xfinity Series. The track was also one of the first paved oval tracks in NASCAR, being built in 1947 by H. Clay Earles. It is also the only remaining race track that has been on the NASCAR circuit from its beginning in 1948.

=== Entry list ===
- (R) denotes rookie driver.
- (i) denotes driver who is ineligible for series driver points.

No.	Driver	Team	Manufacturer
0	Jeffrey Earnhardt	JD Motorsports	Chevrolet
1	Michael Annett	JR Motorsports	Chevrolet
2	Myatt Snider	Richard Childress Racing	Chevrolet
02	Brett Moffitt(i)	Our Motorsports	Chevrolet
03	Andy Lally	Our Motorsports	Chevrolet
4	Landon Cassill	JD Motorsports	Chevrolet
5	Matt Mills	B. J. McLeod Motorsports	Chevrolet
6	Ryan Vargas (R)	JD Motorsports	Chevrolet
7	Justin Allgaier	JR Motorsports	Chevrolet
07	Joe Graf Jr.	SS-Green Light Racing	Chevrolet
8	Josh Berry(R)	JR Motorsports	Chevrolet
9	Noah Gragson	JR Motorsports	Chevrolet
10	Jeb Burton	Kaulig Racing	Chevrolet
11	Justin Haley	Kaulig Racing	Chevrolet
13	Matt Jaskol	MBM Motorsports	Toyota
15	Colby Howard	JD Motorsports	Chevrolet
16	A. J. Allmendinger	Kaulig Racing	Chevrolet
17	J. J. Yeley	SS-Green Light Racing with Rick Ware Racing	Chevrolet
18	Daniel Hemric	Joe Gibbs Racing	Toyota
19	Brandon Jones	Joe Gibbs Racing	Toyota
20	Harrison Burton	Joe Gibbs Racing	Toyota
22	Austin Cindric	Team Penske	Ford
23	Blaine Perkins	Our Motorsports	Chevrolet
26	Brandon Gdovic	Sam Hunt Racing	Toyota
31	Jordan Anderson (I)	Jordan Anderson Racing	Chevrolet
36	Alex Labbé	DGM Racing	Chevrolet
39	Ryan Sieg	RSS Racing	Chevrolet
44	Tommy Joe Martins	Martins Motorsports	Chevrolet
47	Kyle Weatherman	Mike Harmon Racing	Chevrolet
48	Jade Buford (R)	Big Machine Racing Team	Chevrolet
51	Jeremy Clements	Jeremy Clements Racing	Chevrolet
52	Gray Gaulding	Means Racing	Chevrolet
54	Ty Gibbs	Joe Gibbs Racing	Toyota
61	David Starr	Hattori Racing Enterprises	Toyota
66	Timmy Hill	MBM Motorsports	Toyota
68	Brandon Brown	Brandonbilt Motorsports	Chevrolet
74	Bayley Currey	Mike Harmon Racing	Chevrolet
77	Ronnie Bassett Jr.	Bassett Racing	Chevrolet
78	Jesse Little	B. J. McLeod Motorsports	Chevrolet
90	George Gorham Jr.	DGM Racing	Chevrolet
92	Josh Williams	DGM Racing	Chevrolet
98	Riley Herbst	Stewart-Haas Racing	Ford
99	Stefan Parsons	B. J. McLeod Motorsports	Toyota
Official entry list

== Qualifying ==
Harrison Burton was awarded the pole for the race as determined by competition-based formula. Jordan Anderson, Ronnie Bassett Jr., and Andy Lally did not have enough points to qualify for the race.

=== Starting Lineups ===
Pos	No	Driver	Team	Manufacturer
1	20	Harrison Burton	Joe Gibbs Racing	Toyota
2	7	Justin Allgaier	JR Motorsports	Chevrolet
3	16	A. J. Allmendinger	Kaulig Racing	Chevrolet
4	18	Daniel Hemric	Joe Gibbs Racing	Toyota
5	11	Justin Haley	Kaulig Racing	Chevrolet
6	22	Austin Cindric	Team Penske	Ford
7	98	Riley Herbst	Stewart-Haas Racing	Ford
8	9	Noah Gragson	JR Motorsports	Chevrolet
9	2	Myatt Snider	Richard Childress Racing	Chevrolet
10	1	Michael Annett	JR Motorsports	Chevrolet
11	51	Jeremy Clements	Jeremy Clements Racing	Chevrolet
12	39	Ryan Sieg	RSS Racing	Ford
13	10	Jeb Burton	Kaulig Racing	Chevrolet
14	4	Landon Cassill	JD Motorsports	Chevrolet
15	92	Josh Williams	DGM Racing	Chevrolet
16	54	Ty Gibbs	Joe Gibbs Racing	Toyota
17	44	Tommy Joe Martins	Martins Motorsports	Chevrolet
18	0	Jeffrey Earnhardt	JD Motorsports	Chevrolet
19	68	Brandon Brown	Brandonbilt Motorsports	Chevrolet
20	66	Timmy Hill	MBM Motorsports	Toyota
21	78	Jesse Little	B. J. McLeod Motorsports	Chevrolet
22	36	Alex Labbé	DGM Racing	Chevrolet
23	15	Colby Howard	JD Motorsports	Chevrolet
24	19	Brandon Jones	Joe Gibbs Racing	Toyota
25	26	Brandon Gdovic	Sam Hunt Racing	Toyota
26	74	Bayley Currey	Mike Harmon Racing	Chevrolet
27	02	Brett Moffitt	Our Motorsports	Chevrolet
28	07	Joe Graf Jr.	SS-Green Light Racing	Chevrolet
29	8	Josh Berry (R)	JR Motorsports	Chevrolet
30	48	Jade Buford (R)	Big Machine Racing Team	Chevrolet
31	47	Kyle Weatherman	Mike Harmon Racing	Chevrolet
32	23	Blaine Perkins	Our Motorsports	Chevrolet
33	17	J. J. Yeley	SS-Green Light Racing with Rick Ware Racing	Chevrolet
34	61	David Starr	Hattori Racing Enterprises	Toyota
35	6	Ryan Vargas (R)	JD Motorsports	Chevrolet
36	5	Matt Mills	JD Motorsports	Chevrolet
37	90	George Gorham Jr.	DGM Racing	Chevrolet
38	99	Stefan Parsons	B. J. McLeod Motorsports	Toyota
39	52	Gray Gaulding	Means Motorsports	Chevrolet
40	61	Matt Jaskol	MBM Motorsports	Toyota
Official qualifying results

== Race ==
=== Race results ===
==== Stage Results ====
Stage One Laps: 60

Pos	No	Driver	Team	Manufacturer	Points
1	9	Noah Gragson	JR Motorsports	Chevrolet	10
2	22	Austin Cindric	Team Penske	Ford	9
3	11	Justin Haley	Kaulig Racing	Chevrolet	8
4	54	Ty Gibbs	Joe Gibbs Racing	Toyota	7
5	68	Brandon Brown	Brandonbilt Motorspors	Chevrolet	6
6	2	Myatt Snider	Richard Childress Racing	Chevrolet	5
7	51	Jeremy Clements	Jeremy Clements Racing	Chevrolet	4
8	17	J. J. Yeley	SS-Green Light Racing with Rick Ware Racing	Chevrolet	3
9	0	Jeffrey Earnhardt	JD Motorsports	Chevrolet	2
10	74	Bayley Currey	B. J. McLeod Motorsports	Chevrolet	1

Stage Two Laps: 60

Pos	No	Driver	Team	Manufacturer	Points
1	18	Daniel Hemric	Joe Gibbs Racing	Toyota	10
2	9	Noah Gragson	JR Motorsports	Chevrolet	9
3	10	Jeb Burton	Kaulig Racing	Chevrolet	8
4	1	Michael Annett	JR Motorspors	Chevrolet	7
5	51	Jeremy Clements	Jeremy Clements Racing	Chevrolet	6
6	44	Tommy Joe Martins	Martins Motorsports	Chevrolet	5
7	99	Stefan Parsons	B. J. McLeod Motorsports	Toyota	4
8	17	J. J. Yeley	SS-Green Light Racing With Rick Ware Racing	Chevrolet	3
9	90	George Gorham Jr.	DGM Racing	Chevrolet	2
10	8	Josh Berry (R)	JR Motorsports	Chevrolet	1

=== Final Stage Results ===
Laps: 130

Pos	Grid	No	Driver	Team	Manufacturer	Laps	Points	Status
1	29	8	Josh Berry (R)	JR Motorsports	Chevrolet	250	41	Running
2	8	9	Noah Gragson	JR Motorsports	Chevrolet	250	54	Running
3	4	18	Daniel Hemric	Joe Gibbs Racing	Toyota	250	44	Running
4	16	54	Ty Gibbs	Joe Gibbs Racing	Toyota	250	40	Running
5	24	19	Brandon Jones	Joe Gibbs Racing	Toyota	250	32	Running
6	6	22	Austin Cindric	Team Penske	Ford	250	40	Running
7	1	20	Harrison Burton	Joe Gibbs Racing	Toyota	250	30	Running
8	5	11	Justin Haley	Kaulig Racing	Chevrolet	250	37	Running
9	2	7	Justin Allgaier	JR Motorsports	Chevrolet	250	28	Running
10	10	1	Michael Annett	JR Motorsports	Chevrolet	250	34	Running
11	13	10	Jeb Burton	Kaulig Racing	Chevrolet	250	34	Running
12	27	02	Brett Moffitt (i)	Our Racing	Chevrolet	250	0	Running
13	3	16	A. J. Allmendinger	Kaulig Racing	Chevrolet	250	24	Running
14	11	51	Jeremy Clements	Jeremy Clements Racing	Chevrolet	250	33	Running
15	9	2	Myatt Snider	Richard Childress Racing	Chevrolet	250	27	Running
16	15	92	Josh Williams	DGM Racing	Chevrolet	250	21	Running
17	25	26	Brandon Gdovic	Sam Hunt Racing	Chevrolet	250	20	Running
18	37	90	George Gorham Jr.	DGM Racing	Chevrolet	250	21	Running
19	30	48	Jade Buford (R)	Big Machine Racing Team	Chevrolet	250	18	Running
20	38	99	Stefan Parsons	B. J. McLeod Motorsports	Toyota	249	21	Running
21	39	52	Gray Gaulding	Means Motorsports	Chevrolet	249	16	Running
22	34	61	David Starr	Hattori Racing Enterprises	Toyota	249	15	Running
23	12	39	Ryan Sieg	RSS Racing	Ford	249	14	Running
24	33	17	J. J. Yeley	SS-Green Light Racing with Rick Ware Racing	Chevrolet	249	19	Running
25	31	47	Kyle Weatherman	Mike Harmon Racing	Chevrolet	249	12	Running
26	26	74	Bayley Currey	Mike Harmon Racing	Chevrolet	249	12	Running
27	19	68	Brandon Brown	Brandonbilt Motorsports	Chevrolet	248	16	Running
28	40	13	Matt Jaskol	MBM Motorsports	Toyota	248	9	Running
29	7	98	Riley Herbst	Stewart-Haas Racing	Ford	248	8	Running
30	20	66	Timmy Hill	MBM Motorsports	Toyota	248	7	Running
31	22	36	Alex Labbé	DGM Racing	Chevrolet	248	6	Running
32	21	78	Jesse Little	B. J. McLeod Motorsports	Chevrolet	245	5	Running
33	36	5	Matt Mills	B. J. McLeod Motorsports	Chevrolet	241	4	Running
34	17	44	Tommy Joe Martins	Martins Motorsports	Chevrolet	231	8	Running
35	32	23	Blaine Perkins	Our Motorsports	Chevrolet	226	2	Running
36	18	0	Jeffrey Earnhardt	JD Motorsports	Chevrolet	213	3	Suspension
37	14	4	Landon Cassill	JD Motorsports	Chevrolet	197	1	Engine
38	28	07	Joe Graf Jr.	SS-Green Light Racing	Chevrolet	179	4	Accident
39	23	15	Colby Howard	JD Motorsports	Chevrolet	153	1	Suspension
40	35	6	Ryan Vargas (R)	Our Motorsports	Chevrolet	97	1	Accident
Official race results

=== Race statistics ===
- Lead changes: 13 among 9 different drivers
- Cautions/Laps: 12 for 75
- Time of race: 2 hours, 12 minutes, and 2 seconds
- Average speed: 59.758 mph (96.171 km/h)

Previous race: 2021 EchoPark 250	NASCAR Xfinity Series; 2021 season	Next race: 2021 Ag-Pro 300
