= Biscuitville 125 =

NASCAR K&N Pro Series East
- Venue: Virginia International Raceway
- Location: Danville, Virginia; United States
- Corporate sponsor: Biscuitville
- First race: 2013
- Last race: 2016
- Distance: 123.8 miles (199.236 km)
- Laps: 55
- Previous names: Biscuitville 125 (2013–2016)

Circuit information
- Surface: Asphalt
- Length: 2.250 mi (3.621 km)
- Turns: 17

The Biscuitville 125 was a NASCAR K&N Pro Series East race held annually at Virginia International Raceway in Danville, Virginia. The race was 123.8-mile (199.2 km) race. The inaugural event was held in 2013 with last happening in the 2016 season.

== History ==
The event replaced a previous K&N race at CNB Bank Raceway Park on the schedule.

== Past winners ==
Year	Date	No.	Driver	Team	Manufacturer	Race distance		Race time	Average speed (mph)
Year	Date	No.	Driver	Team	Manufacturer	Laps	Miles	Race time	Average speed (mph)
2013	August 24	98	Dylan Kwasniewski	Turner Scott Motorsports	Chevrolet	57*	126.20 (203.099)	1:54:53	66.981
2014	August 16	34	Scott Heckert	Turner Scott Motorsports	Chevrolet	60*	129.2 (207.637)	2:13:53	60.005
2015	August 29	42	Sergio Peña	Rev Racing	Toyota	61*	130 (209.215)	2:11:35	62.584
2016	April 30	39	Austin Cindric	Martin-McClure Racing	Toyota	55	123.8 (199.236)	2:16:52	54.025

- 2013-15: Race extended due to a green-white-checker finish.
