= 2014 NASCAR K&N Pro Series East =

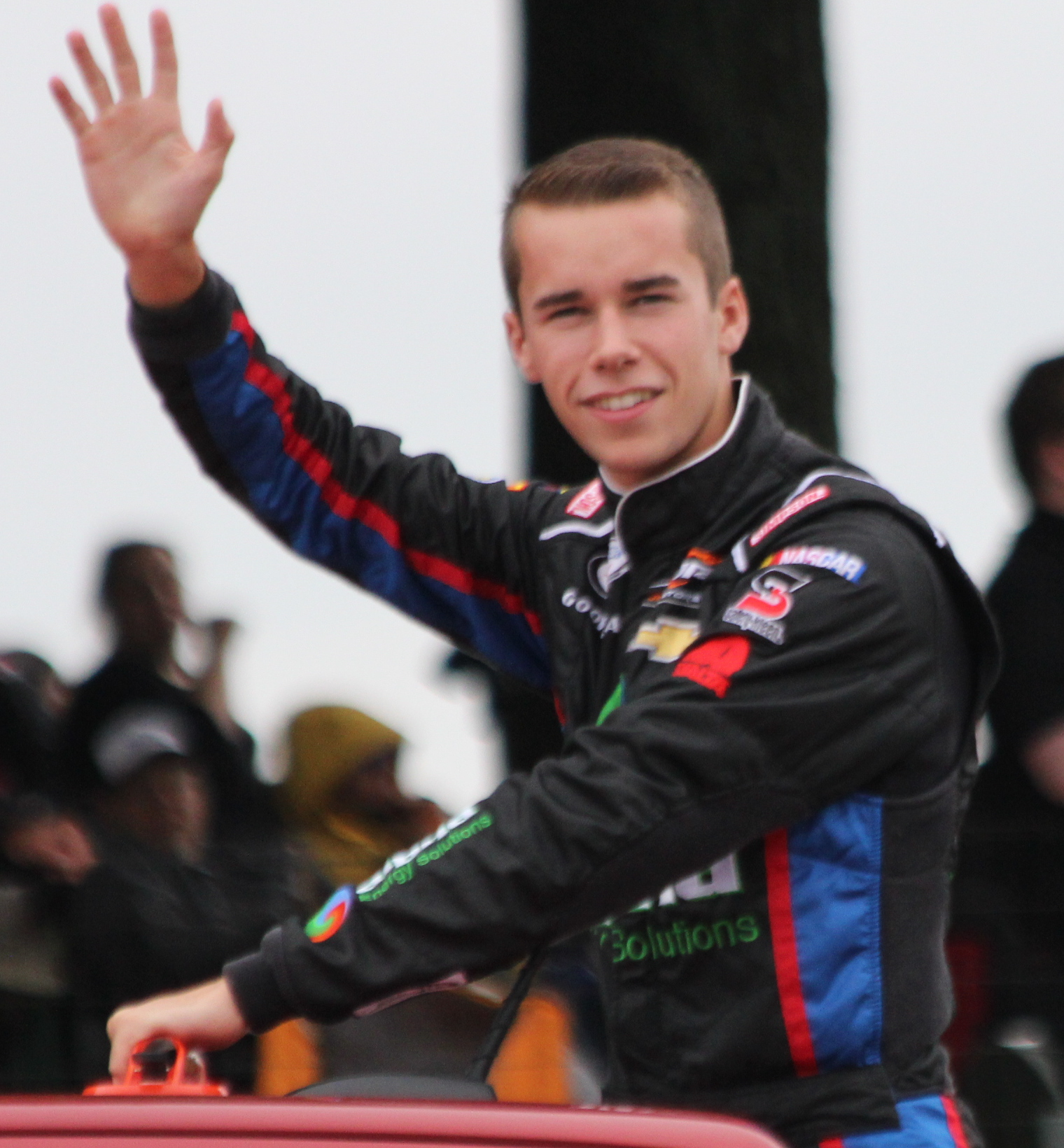
Ben Rhodes, the 2014 K&N Pro Series East champion.

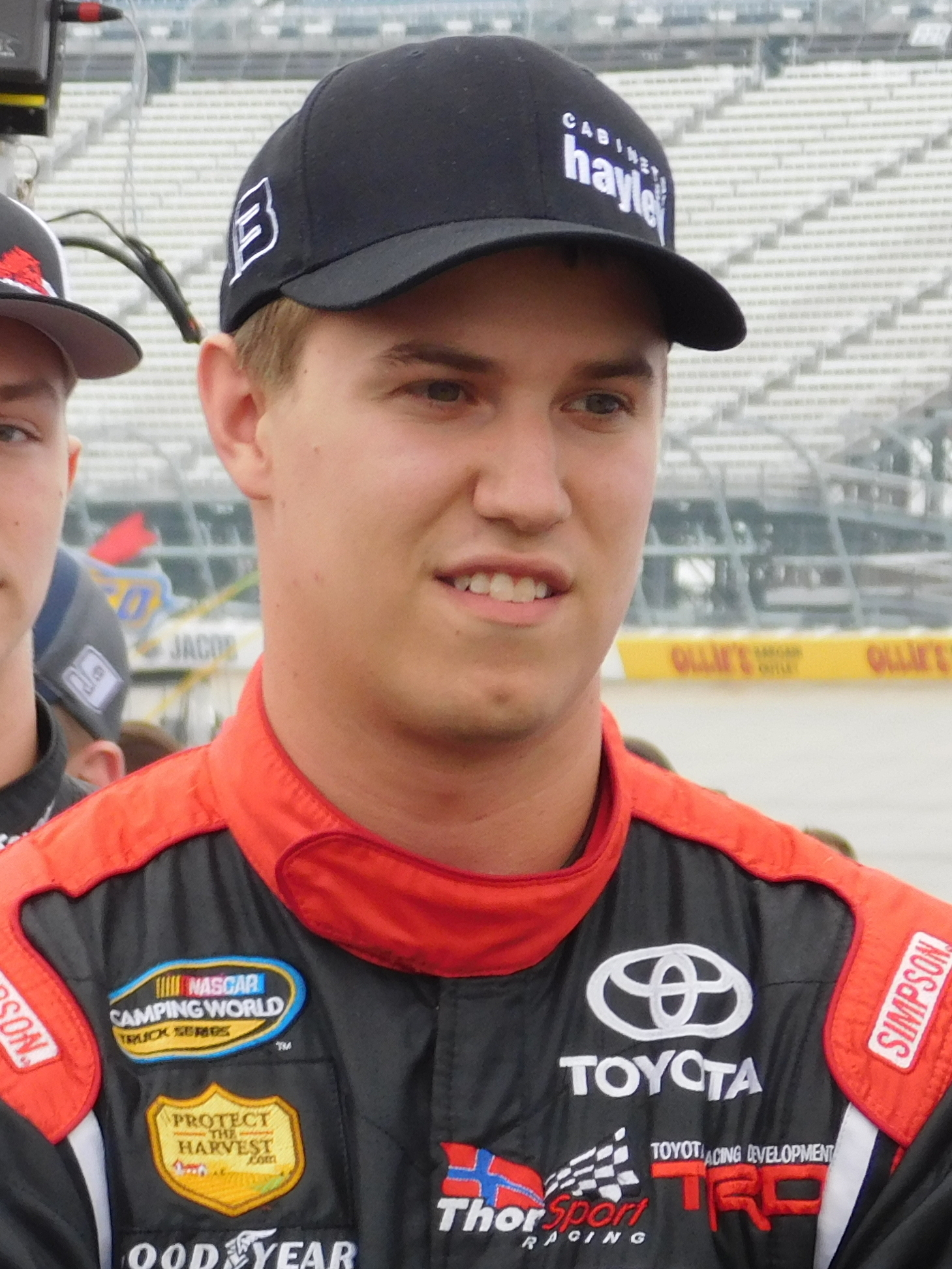
Cameron Hayley finished second behind Rhodes in the championship by 60 points.

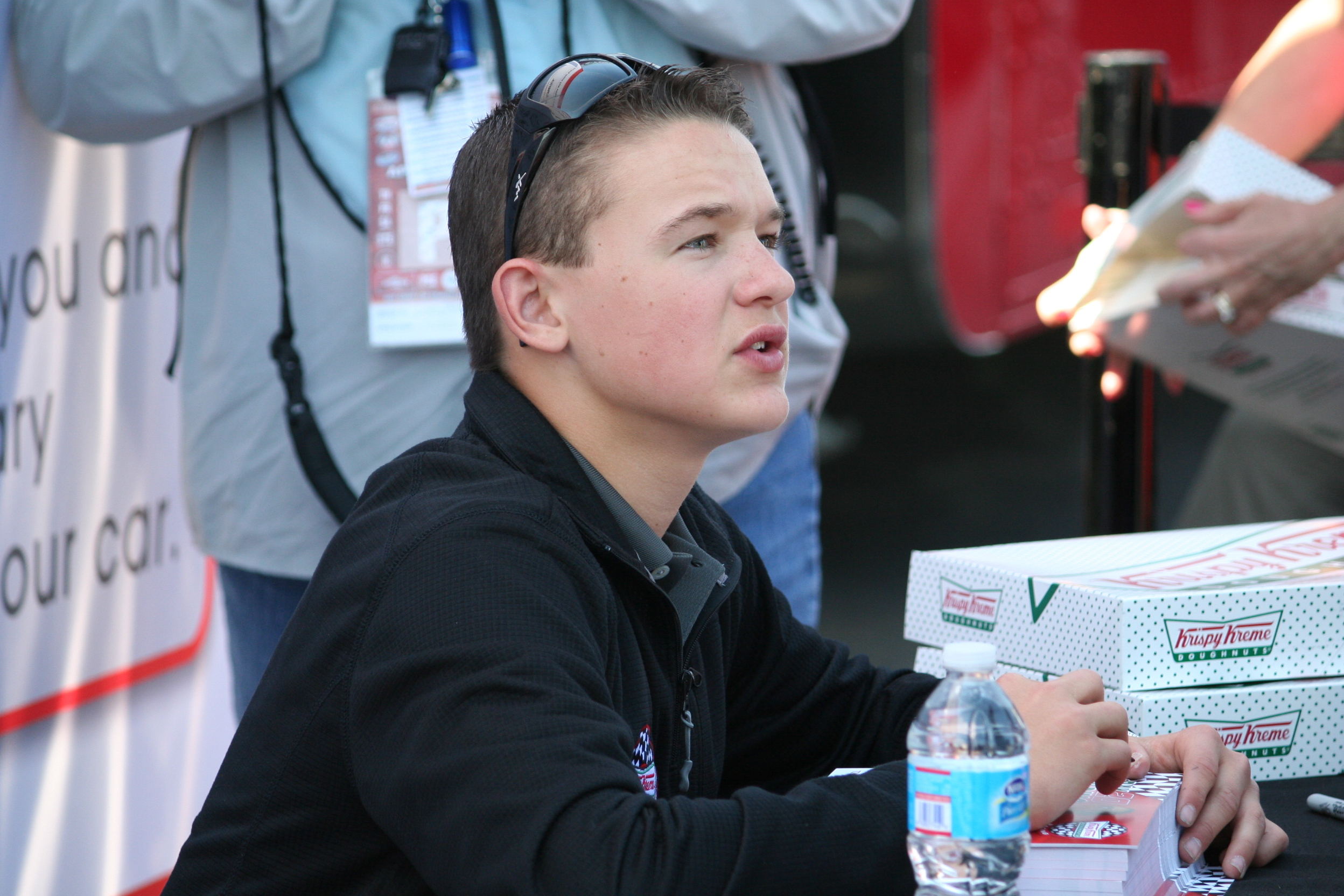
Gray Gaulding finished third in the championship.

The 2014 NASCAR K&N Pro Series East was the 28th season of the K&N Pro Series East. It began with the New Smyrna 150 presented by JEGS at New Smyrna Speedway on February 16, and ended with the Drive Sober 150 at Dover International Speedway on September 26. Dylan Kwasniewski entered the season as the defending Drivers' Champion, but did not return to the series as he moved to the NASCAR Nationwide Series full-time.

Ben Rhodes won the championship with one race to go, after winning five races during the season; he also finished all but three races inside the top-ten. Rhodes ultimately finished 60 points ahead of runner-up Cameron Hayley. Hayley finished in the top-ten in nine races, including five second-place finishes, but was unable to win a race. Third place in the championship went to Gray Gaulding, who like Hayley, failed to win a race, with his best result being a second-place finish at Bristol Motor Speedway. Three other drivers took two race wins, as Daniel Suárez won the opening two races of the season, while Scott Heckert and Austin Hill each won consecutive races, in the final four races. Other drivers that won a race included Brandon Jones, Jesse Little, Sergio Peña, Eddie MacDonald, and Cole Custer.

== Teams and drivers ==
No.	Manufacturer	Car Owner	Race Driver	Crew Chief
00	Chevrolet 6 Toyota 1	Bill McAnally	Cole Custer 7	Matt Goslant
1	Toyota	Shigeaki Hattori	David Garbo Jr. 7 (R)	Nick Hutchins
1	Toyota	Shigeaki Hattori	Ross Chastain 2	Nick Hutchins
1	Toyota	Shigeaki Hattori	Trey Hutchens 2 (R)	Nick Hutchins
2	Toyota	Max Siegel	Ryan Gifford 15	Mark Green
04	Toyota	Ronnie Bassett	Ronnie Bassett Jr. (R)	Seth Smith
4	Toyota	Max Siegel	Sergio Peña	Jon Wolfe
05	Toyota	Larry Berg	Codie Rohrbaugh (R) 3	Mark Huff
6	Toyota	Max Siegel	Daniel Suárez 13	Skip Eyler
6	Toyota	Max Siegel	Ryan Gifford 1	Skip Eyler
6	Toyota	Max Siegel	Bryan Ortiz 2	Skip Eyler
07	Chevrolet 3 Toyota 2	David King	Clint King (R) 5	Teddy Brown
7	Toyota	Tim McGuire	Michael McGuire (R) 2	Tony McGuire
8	Toyota	Joe Nemechek	John Hunter Nemechek 1	Jerry Babb
9	Ford	Richard Bodmer	Richard Bodmer (R) 1	Michael Ebert
10	Chevrolet	Todd Braun	Justin Haley (R) 3	Trent Owens 1 Jamie Jones 1 Mark Durgin 1
11	Toyota	Shigeaki Hattori	Lee Pulliam (R) 5	Randy Goss 4 Bruce Cook 1
12	Dodge	Troy Williams	Beto Monteiro (R) 2	Troy Williams
12	Dodge	Troy Williams	Brandon Glover (R) 1	Troy Williams
12	Dodge	Troy Williams	Ander Vilariño (R) 1	Troy Williams
12	Dodge	Troy Williams	John Salemi 1	Troy Williams
12	Ford	Giles Thornton	Giles Thornton 1	Mike Naake
14	Chevrolet	Bobby Hutchens	Trey Hutchens (R) 6 (Note: At the Casey's General Store 150 at Iowa, two drivers drove with different numbers than normal: Trey Hutchens drove car number 23, instead of his regular car number 14, while Jay Beasley drove car number 44, instead of his regular car number 42.)	Bobby Hutchens
15	Toyota	Bill McAnally	Nick Drake (R)	Dave McCarty
16	Toyota	Mike Curb	Brandon McReynolds 2	Roger Bracken
18	Toyota	Shayne Lockhart	Sam Hunt 7	Shayne Lockhart
18	Toyota	Shayne Lockhart	Brandon Jones 1	Shayne Lockhart
18	Toyota	Shayne Lockhart	Mason Massey (R) 2	Shayne Lockhart
18	Toyota	Shayne Lockhart	Milka Duno (R) 1	Shayne Lockhart
19	Chevrolet	Chuck Buchanan	Chuck Buchanan Jr. (R) 5	Craig Wood
20	Chevrolet 14; Toyota 2	Bob Newberry	Gray Gaulding	Ryan McKinney
21	Toyota	Jennifer Satterfield	Mackena Bell	Glenn Parker
22	Ford	Bryan Hill	Austin Hill (R)	Doug Chouinard
23	Chevrolet	J. P. Morgan	J. P. Morgan (R) 1	James Beck
24	Chevrolet	Bob Newberry	Brennan Newberry	John Monsam
25	Toyota	Bill Venturini	Anderson Bowen (R) 1	David Lenier
26	Toyota	Kenneth Presnell	Dylan Presnell 2	Tony Furr 1 Richard Hubbs 1
27	Ford	Steven Benjamin	Kyle Benjamin (R) 3	Kevin Reed
29	Ford	Jeff Finley	Chad Finley (R) 4	Jeff Finley 2 Marc Browning 1 Shane Whitback 1
31	Chevrolet	Steve Turner	Kaz Grala (R)	Ray Holm
32	Ford	Dale Quarterley	Dale Quarterley 2	Steve Bird
33	Chevrolet	Steve Turner	Brandon Jones 15	Shane Huffman
34	Chevrolet	Harry Scott Jr.	Scott Heckert	Rich Burgdoff
37	Chevrolet	Jeff Spraker	Austin Dillon 1	Scott Goyer
41	Chevrolet	Harry Scott Jr.	Ben Rhodes (R)	Mark McFarland
42	Toyota	Max Siegel	Jay Beasley (R)	Eddie Dickerson
43	Toyota	Andrew Kostecki	Brodie Kostecki (R) 13	Doug George
45	Ford	Darin Odle	Josh Berry (R) 2	Bryan Shaffer
46	Toyota	Rick Gdovic	Brandon Gdovic 7	Charles Denike
46	Toyota	Rick Gdovic	John Holleman IV (R) 2	Charles Denike
47	Chevrolet 2 Toyota 1	Yale Conley	Cale Conley (R) 3	Harold Holly 1 Danny Myers 2
48	Toyota	Bill Whiseant	Duke Whiseant 1	Blake Murphy
51	Chevrolet	Rusty Skewes	Rusty Skewes (R) 1	Chris Edwards
51	Chevrolet	Rusty Skewes	Lee Pulliam (R) 1	Chris Edwards
52	Dodge	Ken Schrader	Matt Tifft 4	Donnie Richeson
52	Chevrolet	Ken Schrader	Quin Houff (R) 1	Donnie Richeson
52	Chevrolet	Ken Schrader	Matt Tifft (R) 1	Donnie Richeson
53	Ford	Robert Torriere	Andrew Ranger 1	Zach D'Ambra
54	Chevrolet	Ric Bruenger	Zachary Bruenger (R) 3 (Note: At the Autolite Iridium XP 150 at Iowa, Zachary Bruenger drove with a different number than normal, as he drove car number 55, instead of his regular car number 54.)	Billy Smith 2 Ty Joiner 1 Dustin Burchette 1
54	Chevrolet	Ric Bruenger	Brad Means (R) 1	Billy Smith 2 Ty Joiner 1 Dustin Burchette 1
55	Chevrolet 4 Toyota 1	Derek Beatrice	Jerry Dawson (R) 5	Jamie Aube
56	Toyota	Akinori Ogata	Akinori Ogata 5	Tracy Morgan 1 Dale Quarterley 2 Steve Bird 1 Ben Wright 1
57	Chevrolet	Thomas Oakley	Brandon Oakley (R) 1	Jeff Fultz
63	Toyota	Joe Salemi	John Salemi 2	Kevin Salemi
64	Toyota	Rick Gdovic	Brandon Gdovic 1	Joey Cohen
71	Chevrolet	Rob Grimm	Eddie MacDonald 10	Rollie Lachance
75	Chevrolet	Daniel Russell	Nathan Russell (R) 2	Steve Portenga
77	Dodge	Kerry Scherer	Anderson Bowen (R) 3	Paul Andrews
81	Chevrolet	Michael Burns	Jeremy Burns (R) 3	Ron Otto
81	Chevrolet	Michael Burns	Will Burns (R) 1	Ron Otto
86	Chevrolet	Troy Williams	Frédéric Gabillon (R) 1	Don Roberts
89	Chevrolet	Kevin Cywinski	Cory Joyce (R) 1	Darren Shaw
89	Chevrolet	B. J. McLeod	Matt Tifft 1	Phillip Bell
91	Toyota	Andrew Bloom	Jordan Anderson 1	Tracy Norman
96	Chevrolet	Ben Kennedy	Kenzie Ruston	Mike Fritts
97	Chevrolet	Jason Little	Jesse Little	Kris Bowen
98	Chevrolet	Mike Curb	Cameron Hayley	Mardy Lindley
99	Toyota	Bill McAnally	Patrick Staropoli (R) 3	Duane Knorr 3 Jeff Jefferson 1
99	Ford	Bill McAnally	Ryan Reed 1	Duane Knorr 3 Jeff Jefferson 1

== Schedule ==
No.	Race title	Track	Location	Date
1	New Smyrna 150 presented by JEGS	New Smyrna Speedway	New Smyrna Beach, Florida	February 16
2	UNOH Battle at the Beach	Daytona International Speedway	Daytona Beach, Florida	February 18
3	PittLite 125	Bristol Motor Speedway	Bristol, Tennessee	March 15
4	Kevin Whitaker Chevrolet 150	Greenville-Pickens Speedway	Greenville, South Carolina	March 22
5	Blue Ox 100	Richmond International Raceway	Richmond, Virginia	April 26
6	Casey's General Store 150 (Note: The Casey's General Store 150 was held as a combined event, with competitors from the K&N Pro Series East competing along with competitors for the K&N Pro Series West. The race was run with a series-based point distribution, where drivers received points and statistical credit for their finish relative to other drivers in their series, not to the whole field in general.)	Iowa Speedway	Newton, Iowa	May 17
7	NASCAR Hall of Fame 150	Bowman Gray Stadium	Winston-Salem, North Carolina	May 31
8	Pensacola 150	Five Flags Speedway	Pensacola, Florida	June 13
9	Visit Hampton VA 175	Langley Speedway	Hampton, Virginia	June 21
10	Granite State 100	New Hampshire Motor Speedway	Loudon, New Hampshire	July 11
11	JEGS 150	Columbus Motor Speedway	Columbus, Ohio	July 19
12	Autolite Iridium XP 150 (Note: The Autolite Iridium XP 150 was held as a combined event, with competitors from the K&N Pro Series East competing along with competitors for the K&N Pro Series West. The race was run with a series-based point distribution, where drivers received points and statistical credit for their finish relative to other drivers in their series, not to the whole field in general.)	Iowa Speedway	Newton, Iowa	August 1
13	Bully Hill Vineyards 125	Watkins Glen International	Watkins Glen, New York	August 8
14	Biscuitville 125	Virginia International Raceway	Danville, Virginia	August 16
15	Kevin Whitaker Chevrolet 140	Greenville-Pickens Speedway	Greenville, South Carolina	September 6
16	Drive Sober 150	Dover International Speedway	Dover, Delaware	September 26

== Results and standings ==
=== Races ===
No.	Race	Pole position	Most laps led	Winning driver	Manufacturer	No.	Winning team
1	New Smyrna 150 presented by JEGS	Cameron Hayley	Daniel Suárez	Daniel Suárez	Toyota	6	Rev Racing
2	UNOH Battle at the Beach	Ben Rhodes	Daniel Suárez	Daniel Suárez	Toyota	6	Rev Racing
3	PittLite 125	Ben Rhodes	Ben Rhodes	Eddie MacDonald	Chevrolet	71	Grimm Racing
4	Kevin Whitaker Chevrolet 150	Ben Rhodes	Ben Rhodes	Ben Rhodes	Chevrolet	41	Turner Scott Motorsports
5	Blue Ox 100	Nick Drake	Cole Custer	Cole Custer	Chevrolet	00	Bill McAnally Racing
6	Casey's General Store 150	Brodie Kostecki	Ben Rhodes	Ben Rhodes	Chevrolet	41	Turner Scott Motorsports
7	NASCAR Hall of Fame 150	Ben Rhodes	Ben Rhodes	Ben Rhodes	Chevrolet	41	Turner Scott Motorsports
8	Pensacola 150	Gray Gaulding	Gray Gaulding	Ben Rhodes	Chevrolet	41	Turner Scott Motorsports
9	Visit Hampton VA 175	Scott Heckert	Ben Rhodes	Ben Rhodes	Chevrolet	41	Turner Scott Motorsports
10	Granite State 100	Ben Rhodes	Gray Gaulding	Jesse Little	Chevrolet	97	Team Little Racing
11	JEGS 150	Scott Heckert	Cameron Hayley	Sergio Peña	Toyota	4	Rev Racing
12	Autolite Iridium XP 150	Jesse Little	Cole Custer	Brandon Jones	Chevrolet	33	Turner Scott Motorsports
13	Bully Hill Vineyards 125	Brodie Kostecki	Andrew Ranger	Scott Heckert	Chevrolet	34	Turner Scott Motorsports
14	Biscuitville 125	Scott Heckert	Cameron Hayley	Scott Heckert	Chevrolet	34	Turner Scott Motorsports
15	Kevin Whitaker Chevrolet 140	Ben Rhodes	Austin Hill	Austin Hill	Ford	22	Austin Hill Racing
16	Drive Sober 150	Jesse Little	Austin Hill	Austin Hill	Ford	22	Austin Hill Racing

=== Drivers' championship ===
(key) Bold - Pole position awarded by time. Italics - Pole position set by final practice results or rainout. * – Most laps led.

Pos.	Driver	NSM	DAY	BRI	GRE	RCH	IOW	BGS	FIF	LGY	NHA	COL	IOW	GLN	VIR	GRE	DOV	Points
1	Ben Rhodes **(R)**	4	**15**	**3***	**1***	2	1*	**1***	1	1*	**22**	3	7	3	10	**4**	15	640
2	Cameron Hayley	**2**	14	17	3	6	14	18	3	2	15	2*	19	8	2*	2	13	580
3	Gray Gaulding	7	7	2	11	11	25	6	**5***	18	8*	15	13	18	4	3	8	562
4	Brandon Jones	3	24	8	23	7	5	4	2	6	21	14	1	6	7	7	21	551
5	Austin Hill **(R)**	27	2	5	22	4	10	3	10	15	7	18	34	17	3	1*	1*	546
6	Jesse Little	18	12	13	4	10	21	16	6	9	1	4	**12**	5	8	9	**23**	546
7	Kaz Grala **(R)**	10	10	20	7	14	36	11	16	5	10	8	8	4	5	11	2	542
8	Scott Heckert	21	9	27	17	18	3	12	17	**4**	25	**10**	5	1	**1**	15	3	526
9	Kenzie Ruston	6	6	22	12	35	16	8	4	3	14	12	2	9	11	12	14	522
10	Nick Drake **(R)**	15	4	29	16	**3**	2	10	14	7	24	7	16	10	12	5	28	507
11	Ronnie Bassett Jr. **(R)**	19	23	23	2	5	8	5	9	20	6	11	22	15	17	20	12	491
12	Sergio Peña	22	13	24	9	30	11	20	8	14	30	1	4	20	14	18	6	466
13	Jay Beasley **(R)**	24	16	15	19	28	4	9	7	16	4	13	29	14	23	14	16	461
14	Brennan Newberry	13	22	4	13	26	6	15	15	11	28	9	39	11	13	6	25	461
15	Ryan Gifford	23	20	34	6	22	19	7	18	21	26	5	40	23	9	8	9	431
16	Mackena Bell	8	17	21	21	15	32	13	12	13	27	22	23	13	21	16	17	430
17	Daniel Suárez	1*	1*	26	5	32	7	2	21	10	31		11	19			22	397
18	Brodie Kostecki **(R)**	20	18	12	8	8	**33**				9	21	15	**24**	20	22	5	375
19	Eddie MacDonald	17	19	1	10	27	35			8	2		6				4	329
20	Cole Custer			14		1*	13						3*	16	18		18	234
21	Brandon Gdovic	9	11	25		19				17	29				15		11	216
22	Trey Hutchens **(R)**			33		20	18	17			13		20			17	27	195
23	David Garbo Jr. **(R)**	16	21	7	20	16	27				16							194
24	Matt Tifft	12		9		13					12				6		19	193
25	Lee Pulliam **(R)**	5	5	31	18	21			19									165
26	Sam Hunt	28	INQ	18	26	25		14							16	19		162
27	Clint King **(R)**	26	DNQ^{1}	11	14	34												108
28	Patrick Staropoli **(R)**	11	8	6			15^{3}											107
29	Chad Finley **(R)**					12					5		DNQ^{1}				30	101
30	Anderson Bowen **(R)**			19							17		43				26	86
31	Chuck Buchanan Jr. **(R)**			35		37				19		20			24			85
32	Kyle Benjamin **(R)**										11		17				24	83
33	Justin Haley **(R)**											23	24				7	82
34	Cale Conley			30							3		32					76
35	Jeremy Burns **(R)**			28		9					19							76
36	Jerry Dawson **(R)**	30	25	32	25	36												72
37	Brandon McReynolds	14	3				34^{3}						14^{3}					71
38	Codie Rohrbaugh **(R)**								13		23						29	67
39	Ross Chastain											6	21					66
40	Akinori Ogata			DNQ^{1}		31			20				30					65
41	John Holleman IV **(R)**							19		12								57
42	Bryan Ortiz														19	13		56
43	Zachary Bruenger **(R)**			DNQ^{1}	15								33					56
44	John Salemi					24					20						DNQ^{1}	56
45	Mason Massey **(R)**									22		16						50
46	Michael McGuire **(R)**			10		29												49
47	Josh Berry **(R)**				24	17												47
48	Andrew Ranger													2*				44
49	Dylan Presnell			Wth^{2}													10	42
50	Ryan Reed													7				37
51	Beto Monteiro **(R)**		DNQ^{1}			23												37
52	Dale Quarterley														22		DNQ^{1}	35
53	Will Burns **(R)**															10		34
54	Nathan Russell **(R)**	25	DNQ^{1}															34
55	Duke Whiseant								11									33
56	Frédéric Gabillon **(R)**													12				32
57	Brandon Glover **(R)**			16														28
58	Brad Means **(R)**											17						27
59	Giles Thornton						29^{3}				18							26
60	Brandon Oakley **(R)**											19						25
61	Milka Duno																20	24
62	Austin Dillon													21				23
63	Quin Houff **(R)**															21		23
64	Richard Bodmer **(R)**													22				22
65	John Hunter Nemechek													25				19
66	Cory Joyce **(R)**		26															18
67	J. P. Morgan **(R)**													DNQ^{1}				18
68	Ander Vilariño **(R)**													DNQ^{1}				17
69	Rusty Skewes **(R)**	29																15
70	Jordan Anderson **(R)**					33												11
Ineligible for K&N Pro Series East points
Pos.	Driver	NSM	DAY	BRI	GRE	RCH	IOW	BGS	FIF	LGY	NHA	COL	IOW	GLN	VIR	GRE	DOV	Points
	David Mayhew						9						10					
	Greg Pursley						12						9					
	James Bickford **(R)**						17						18					
	Dylan Lupton						20						27					
	Thomas Martin						22						28					
	Anthony Giannone						23						42					
	Luis Tyrrell **(R)**						24											
	Chris Eggleston												25					
	Taylor Cuzick						26											
	Kelly Admiraal												26					
	Jack Sellers						28						37					
	John Wood						30						36					
	Phyl Zubizareta **(R)**						31											
	Justin Funkhouser												31					
	Jairo Avila Jr. **(R)**												35					
	Rich DeLong III **(R)**						37						38					
	Zack Huffman												41					
Pos.	Driver	NSM	DAY	BRI	GRE	RCH	IOW	BGS	FIF	LGY	NHA	COL	IOW	GLN	VIR	GRE	DOV	Points

Notes

- ^{1} – Clint King, Chad Finley, Akinori Ogata, Zachary Bruenger, Beto Monteiro, Nathan Russell, J. P. Morgan, Ander Vilariño, John Salemi and Dale Quarterley received championship points despite failing to qualifying qualify for the race.
- ^{2} – Dylan Presnell received championship points, despite withdrawing prior to the race.
- ^{3} – Scored points towards the K&N Pro Series West.

== See also ==
- 2014 NASCAR Sprint Cup Series
- 2014 NASCAR Nationwide Series
- 2014 NASCAR Camping World Truck Series
- 2014 ARCA Racing Series
- 2014 NASCAR K&N Pro Series West
- 2014 NASCAR Whelen Modified Tour
- 2014 NASCAR Whelen Southern Modified Tour
- 2014 NASCAR Canadian Tire Series
- 2014 NASCAR Toyota Series
- 2014 NASCAR Whelen Euro Series
