= UNOH 100 =

NASCAR K&N Pro Series East
- Venue: Richmond International Raceway
- Location: Richmond, Virginia; United States
- Corporate sponsor: University of Northwestern Ohio
- First race: 2011
- Last race: 2015
- Distance: 75 miles (120 km)
- Laps: 100
- Previous names: Blue Ox 100 (2011–2014)
- Most wins (team): Rev Racing (2)
- Most wins (manufacturer): Toyota (3)

Circuit information
- Surface: Asphalt
- Length: 0.750 mi (1.207 km)
- Turns: 4

The UNOH 100 was a NASCAR K&N Pro Series East race held annually at Richmond International Raceway from 2011 to 2015.

== History ==
NASCAR decided to add a NASCAR K&N Pro Series East race at Richmond International Raceway for the 2011 season. The final race in 2015 was shortened due to rain.

== Past winners ==
Year	Date	No.	Driver	Team	Manufacturer	Race distance		Race time	Average speed (mph)
Year	Date	No.	Driver	Team	Manufacturer	Laps	Miles (km)	Race time	Average speed (mph)
2011	April 28	6	Bubba Wallace	Rev Racing	Toyota	100	75 (120)	0:55:20	81.325
2012	April 26	11	Brett Moffitt	Hattori Racing Enterprises	Toyota (2)	103*	77.25 (123.6)	1:03:19	73.203
2013	April 25	2	Ryan Gifford	Rev Racing (2)	Toyota (3)	100	75 (120)	1:03:01	71.41
2014	April 26	00	Cole Custer	Bill McAnally Racing	Chevrolet	100	75 (120)	0:59:33	75.567
2015	September 10	22	Austin Hill	Austin Hill Racing	Ford	70*	52.5 (84)	0:39:46	80.489

- 2012: Race extended due to overtime.
- 2015: Race shortened due to rain.
