= Sergio Peña (racing driver) =

American racing driver (born 1993)

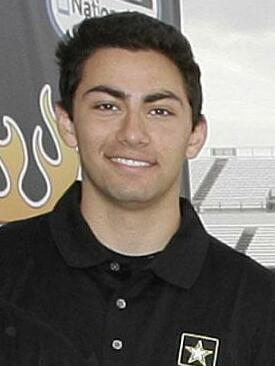
- Peña at Richmond International Raceway in 2011
- Born: February 13, 1993 (age 33) Winchester, Virginia, U.S.

NASCAR K&N Pro Series East career
- Debut season: 2010
- Former teams: Rev Racing; Hattori Racing Enterprises; Bill McAnally Racing; Spraker Racing Enterprises; DRIVE Technology / Sam Hunt Racing
- Starts: 60
- Wins: 5
- Poles: 0
- Best finish: 5th in 2011
- Finished last season: 52nd (2016)

Previous series
- 2013: NASCAR K&N Pro Series West
- Statistics up to date as of May 10, 2020.

Sergio Peña (born February 13, 1993) is an American former professional stock car racing driver. He competed in what is now the ARCA Menards Series East for seven years from 2010 to 2016. In addition, he has made starts in the West Series and was a member of NASCAR's Drive for Diversity program.

== Racing career ==
Peña's father bought him a dirt bike at the age of four. He began racing at the age of 13, driving motocross, go-karts, and Formula cars, which included competing in the Formula BMW series.

In 2010, Peña started racing stock cars, and joined Revolution Racing for his rookie season in the NASCAR K&N Pro Series East. He was also named as one of eleven drivers to be part of the Drive for Diversity program for that year. At the start of the season, Peña impressed people with his second-place finish in the Toyota All-Star Showdown, where he started on the pole and finished second in the race behind NASCAR Cup Series driver Joey Logano. He would finish twelfth in the standings with three top tens. He won three times in 2011 and finished fifth in the series.

Peña competed in his third K&N East season in 2012, moving to Hattori Racing Enterprises to driving the No. 1 car. Peña ran a limited NASCAR touring schedule in 2013, before returning full-time to the K&N East Series for 2014. He collected his fourth series win at Columbus.

In the late 2010s, Peña raced late model stock cars at Dominion Raceway.

== Personal life ==
Peña is a first generation Colombian-American and lives in Virginia with his family. His father Jai was instrumental in helping Peña reach NASCAR, spending over a million dollars to help fund his son's career.

== Motorsports career results ==
=== NASCAR ===
(key) (Bold – Pole position awarded by qualifying time. Italics – Pole position earned by points standings or practice time. * – Most laps led.)

==== K&N Pro Series East ====
NASCAR K&N Pro Series East results
Year	Team	No.	Make	1	2	3	4	5	6	7	8	9	10	11	12	13	14	15	16	NKNPSEC	Pts	Ref
2010	Revolution Racing	4	Chevy	GRE; 27	SBO; 14	IOW; 14	MAR; 14	NHA; 15	LRP; 10	LEE; 15	JFC; 6	NHA; 16	DOV; 8							12th	1222	
2011	Revolution Racing	4	Toyota	GRE; 7	**SBO**; 1	RCH; 9	IOW; 21	BGS; 26	JFC; 20	**LGY**; 1*	NHA; 8	COL; 15	**GRE**; 1*	NHA; 2	DOV; 26					5th	1657	
2012	Hattori Racing Enterprises	1	Toyota	BRI; 20	GRE; 29	RCH; 9	IOW; 7	BGS; 19	JFC; 6	LGY; 5	CNB; 17	COL; 4	IOW; 3	NHA; 24	DOV; 12	GRE; 9	CAR; 8			10th	444	
2013	Bill McAnally Racing	16	Toyota	BRI	GRE	FIF; 8	RCH	BGS	IOW	LGY	COL	IOW	VIR	GRE	NHA					32nd	90	
2013	Spraker Racing Enterprises	37	Chevy													DOV; 20				32nd	90	
2013	DRIVE Technology	18	Toyota														RAL; 14			32nd	90	
2014	Rev Racing	4	Toyota	NSM; 22	DAY; 13	BRI; 24	GRE; 9	RCH; 30	IOW; 10	BGS; 20	FIF; 8	LGY; 14	NHA; 30	**COL**; 1	IOW; 4	GLN; 20	VIR; 14	GRE; 18	DOV; 6	12th	466	
2015	Hattori Racing Enterprises	1	Toyota	NSM; 9	GRE	BRI	IOW	BGS	LGY	COL	NHA	IOW	GLN							25th	129	
2015	Rev Racing	42	Toyota											MOT; 10	VIR; 1	RCH; 31	DOV			25th	129	
2016	Hunt-Sellers Racing	18	Toyota	NSM	MOB	GRE	BRI	VIR; 12	DOM	STA	COL	NHA	IOW	GLN	GRE	NJM	DOV			52nd	32	

==== K&N Pro Series West ====
NASCAR K&N Pro Series West results
Year	Team	No.	Make	1	2	3	4	5	6	7	8	9	10	11	12	13	14	15	NKNPSWC	Pts	Ref
2013	Bill McAnally Racing	16	Toyota	PHO; 5	S99; 2	BIR; 9	IOW	L44	SON	CNS	IOW	EVG	SPO	MMP	SMP	AAS	KCR	PHO	24th	116	
