= Columbus Motor Speedway =

Former racetrack in Ohio, U.S.

- Location: 1841 Williams Rd; Columbus, Ohio, 43207
- Coordinates: 39°53′11″N 82°56′36″W
- Capacity: 5,000
- Owner: Nuckles family
- Operator: Nuckles family
- Broke ground: 1945
- Opened: 1946
- Closed: 2016
- Major events: NASCAR K&N Pro Series East; NAPA 150 (2011–2016); NASCAR Midwest Series (2004); ARCA Hooters Super Car Series (1982, 1993)
- Website: www.columbusspeedway.com

Oval (1946–2016)
- Surface: Asphalt
- Length: 0.536 km (0.333 mi)
- Turns: 2
- Banking: Turns: 8°

Figure 8
- Surface: Asphalt
- Turns: 2
- Banking: Turns: 8°

The Columbus Motor Speedway (CMS) was a 0.333 mi (0.536 km) asphalt oval and figure-eight racing track located south of Columbus, Ohio, within the town limits of Obetz.

== History ==
In 1945, John Nuckles and Robert Roseberry purchased 50 acres (200,000 m^{2}) of land for site of the future race track. The track opened in 1946 as a dirt track for motorcycles. In 1950 the track was given lighting and in 1957, the track was paved for the first time as car racing, specifically stock car racing, became more popular. Robert Roseberry sold his portion to John Nuckles after the paving was complete. The track was run by the Nuckles for many years, and was owned and operated by the Nuckles family. Among the drivers to make their names at the CMS are Neal Sceva, Dick Freeman, Benny Parsons, and Ralph O'Day. Among those killed at Columbus Motor speedway is Bessie E. Amos.

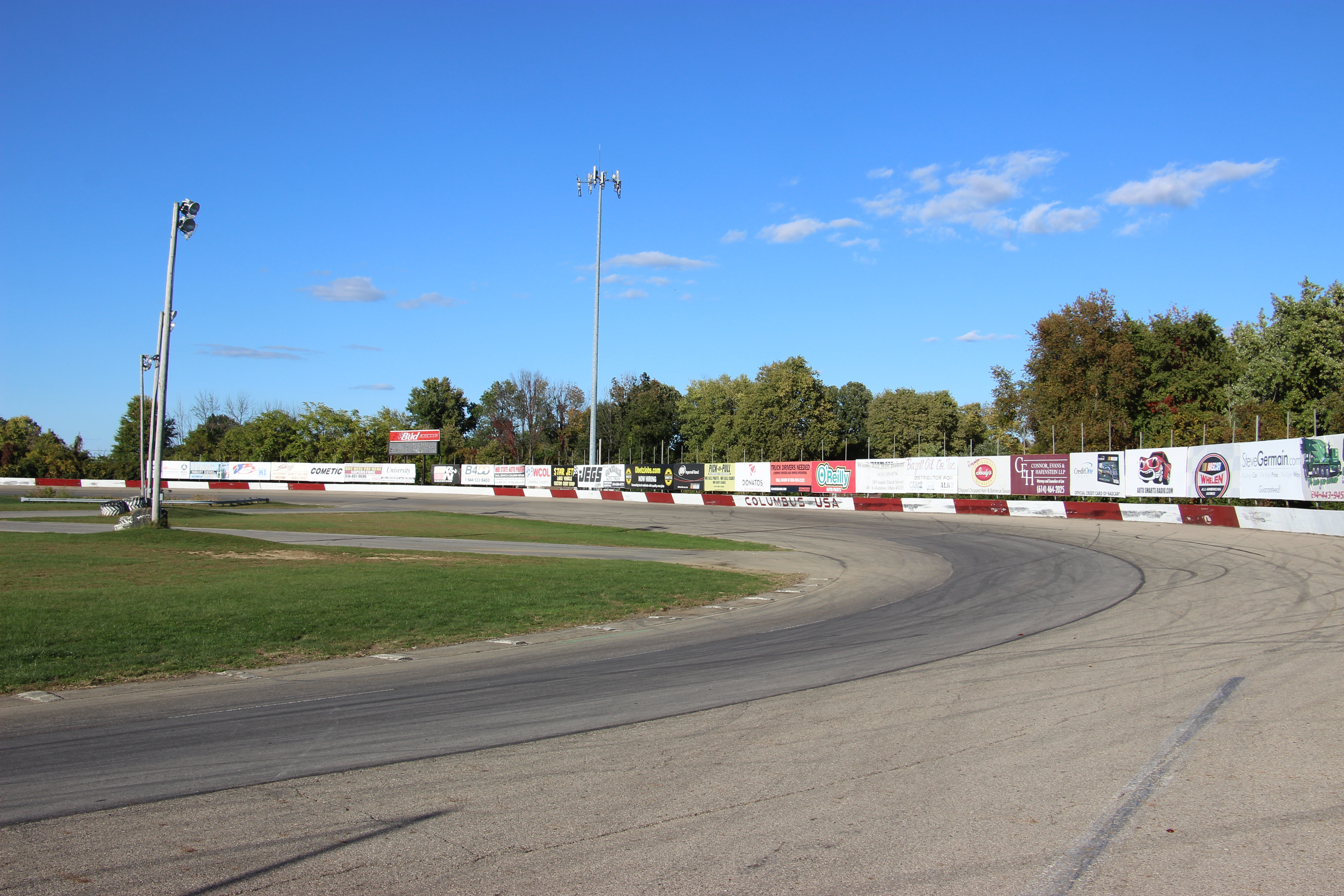
A portion of the track, viewed shortly after closing.

The track was one of three tracks in Ohio to be granted a NASCAR sanctioning agreement. It hosted Whelen All-American Series (formerly the Dodge Weekly Racing Series) races sanctioned by NASCAR. It also hosted many exhibition events, which were some of the most popular attractions, including trailer races, school bus figure-eight races, demolition derbies, "roll over" contests, monster truck stunt rallies, "powder-puff" races, and NASCAR "legends" races which featured famous Cup Series drivers. Due to the relatively high compensation required to secure Cup driver participation in the NASCAR "legends" races, said events were discontinued before the track was closed. In late 2016, the Nuckles Family decided to sell the track to Obetz. The Fortress Obetz now sits where the speedway was.

The speedway hosted a NASCAR K&N Pro Series East event (the NAPA 150) from 2011 through 2016. The winners of the races were notable NASCAR drivers, like Bubba Wallace, Cale Conley, Daniel Suárez, Sergio Peña, Rico Abreu and Justin Haley. Also at Columbus Motor Speedway, the NASCAR Midwest Series ran a race in 2004, which was won by Justin Diercks.

The ARCA Racing Series also ran two races at the track, one in 1982 and the other in 1993.

The track closed at the end of the 2016 season; the village of Obetz purchased the land from the Nuckles family in order to improve facilities for the Columbus Crew SC and a local rugby team.

== 2009 platform collapse ==
The race track made national headlines on April 11, 2009, when the concrete platform that supported the announcer's box collapsed shortly after the gate opened. One person was temporarily stuck in the rubble and six people suffered minor injuries at the season-opening event. Local rescue workers were called to the scene and the events were canceled for the evening. After the incident, the platform was repaired and reinforced.

== Sources ==
- Columbus Motor Speedway at cityguide, Retrieved June 23, 2007
- Columbus Motor Speedway at na-motorsports.com, Retrieved June 23, 2007
