= 2018 Go Bowling at The Glen =

Race details
- Race 22 of 36 in the 2018 Monster Energy NASCAR Cup Series
- The 2018 Go Bowling at The Glen program cover.
- Date: August 5, 2018
- Location: Watkins Glen International in Watkins Glen, New York
- Course: Permanent racing facility
- Course length: 2.45 miles (3.94 km)
- Distance: 90 laps, 220.5 mi (354.6 km)
- Average speed: 98.928 miles per hour (159.209 km/h)

Pole position
Driver	Denny Hamlin	Joe Gibbs Racing
- Time: 1:10.260

Most laps led
Driver	Chase Elliott	Hendrick Motorsports
- Laps: 52

Winner
No. 9	Chase Elliott	Hendrick Motorsports

Television in the United States
- Network: NBC
- Announcers: Rick Allen, Steve Letarte (booth), Mike Bagley (Esses), Dale Earnhardt Jr. (Turn 5) and Jeff Burton (Turns 6–7)
- Nielsen ratings: 2.3 (Overnight)

Radio in the United States
- Radio: MRN
- Booth announcers: Joe Moore, Jeff Striegle and Rusty Wallace
- Turn announcers: Dave Moody (Esses), Alex Hayden (Turn 5) and Kyle Rickey (Turns 10-11)

The 2018 Go Bowling at The Glen was a Monster Energy NASCAR Cup Series race held on August 5, 2018 at Watkins Glen International in Watkins Glen, New York. Contested over 90 laps on the 2.45-mile (3.94 km) road course, it was the 22nd race of the 2018 Monster Energy NASCAR Cup Series season. Chase Elliott scored his first career win in this race after holding off a hard-charging Martin Truex Jr. who was the defending winner from last year. This was the final race for Brian France as the CEO of NASCAR, as he was arrested for DUI hours after the race occurred. Jim France was the CEO starting from the Michigan race.

== Report ==
=== Background ===
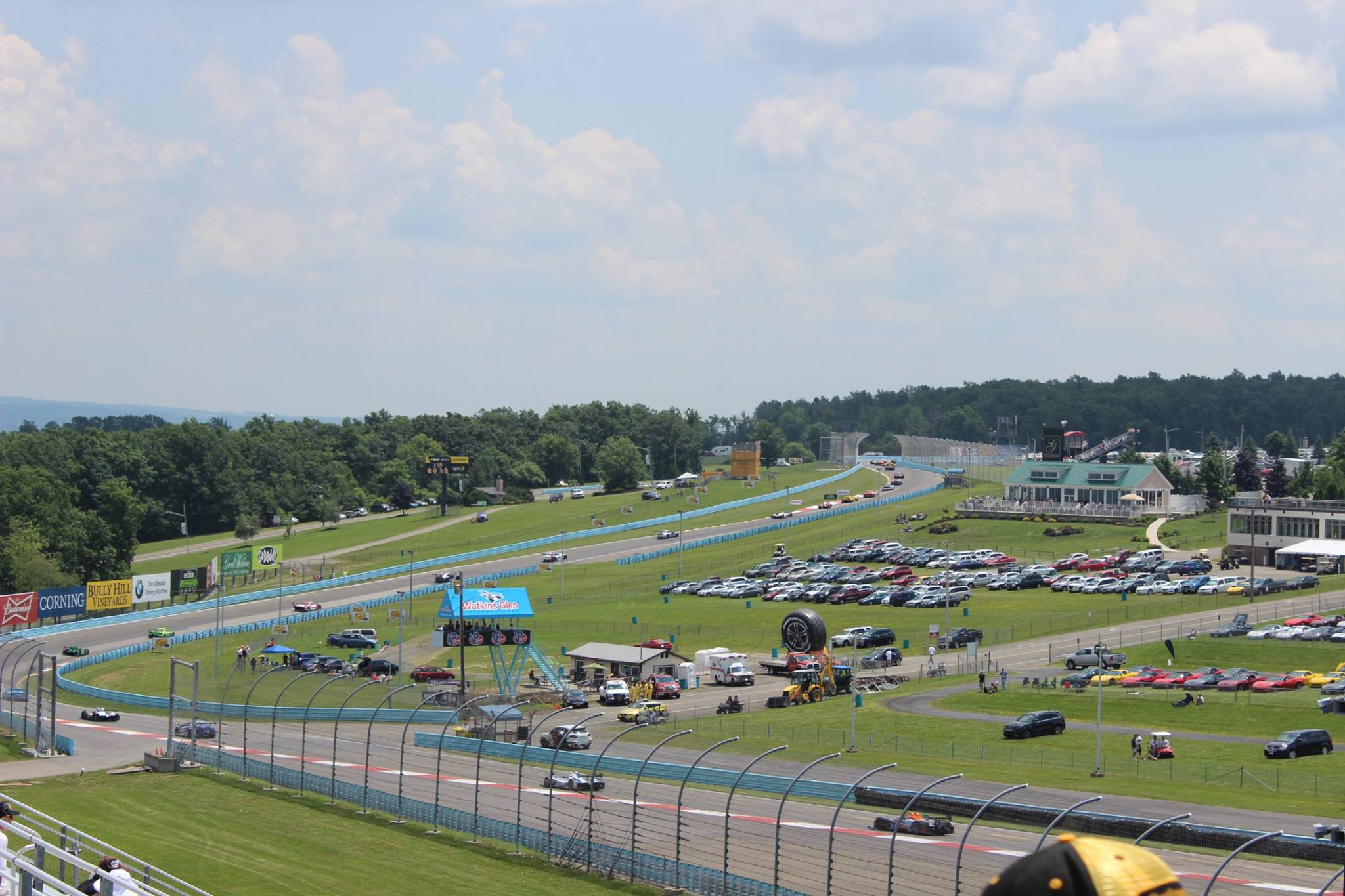
Watkins Glen International

Watkins Glen International (nicknamed "The Glen") is an automobile race track located in Watkins Glen, New York at the southern tip of Seneca Lake. It was long known around the world as the home of the Formula One United States Grand Prix, which it hosted for twenty consecutive years (1961–1980), but the site has been home to road racing of nearly every class, including the World Sportscar Championship, Trans-Am, Can-Am, NASCAR Sprint Cup Series, the International Motor Sports Association and the IndyCar Series.

Initially, public roads in the village were used for the race course. In 1956 a permanent circuit for the race was built. In 1968 the race was extended to six hours, becoming the 6 Hours of Watkins Glen. The circuit's current layout has more or less been the same since 1971, although a chicane was installed at the uphill Esses in 1975 to slow cars through these corners, where there was a fatality during practice at the 1973 United States Grand Prix. The chicane was removed in 1985, but another chicane called the "Inner Loop" was installed in 1992 after J.D. McDuffie's fatal accident during the previous year's NASCAR Winston Cup event.

The circuit is known as the Mecca of North American road racing and is a very popular venue among fans and drivers. The facility is currently owned by International Speedway Corporation.

==== Entry list ====
No.	Driver	Team	Manufacturer
00	Landon Cassill	StarCom Racing	Chevrolet
1	Jamie McMurray	Chip Ganassi Racing	Chevrolet
2	Brad Keselowski	Team Penske	Ford
3	Austin Dillon	Richard Childress Racing	Chevrolet
4	Kevin Harvick	Stewart–Haas Racing	Ford
6	Matt Kenseth	Roush Fenway Racing	Ford
9	Chase Elliott	Hendrick Motorsports	Chevrolet
10	Aric Almirola	Stewart–Haas Racing	Ford
11	Denny Hamlin	Joe Gibbs Racing	Toyota
12	Ryan Blaney	Team Penske	Ford
13	Ty Dillon	Germain Racing	Chevrolet
14	Clint Bowyer	Stewart–Haas Racing	Ford
15	Ross Chastain (i)	Premium Motorsports	Chevrolet
17	Ricky Stenhouse Jr.	Roush Fenway Racing	Ford
18	Kyle Busch	Joe Gibbs Racing	Toyota
19	Daniel Suárez	Joe Gibbs Racing	Toyota
20	Erik Jones	Joe Gibbs Racing	Toyota
21	Paul Menard	Wood Brothers Racing	Ford
22	Joey Logano	Team Penske	Ford
23	Spencer Gallagher (i)	BK Racing	Toyota
24	William Byron (R)	Hendrick Motorsports	Chevrolet
31	Ryan Newman	Richard Childress Racing	Chevrolet
32	Matt DiBenedetto	Go Fas Racing	Ford
34	Michael McDowell	Front Row Motorsports	Ford
37	Chris Buescher	JTG Daugherty Racing	Chevrolet
38	David Ragan	Front Row Motorsports	Ford
41	Kurt Busch	Stewart–Haas Racing	Ford
42	Kyle Larson	Chip Ganassi Racing	Chevrolet
43	Bubba Wallace (R)	Richard Petty Motorsports	Chevrolet
47	A. J. Allmendinger	JTG Daugherty Racing	Chevrolet
48	Jimmie Johnson	Hendrick Motorsports	Chevrolet
51	Josh Bilicki (i)	Rick Ware Racing	Ford
72	Cole Whitt	TriStar Motorsports	Chevrolet
78	Martin Truex Jr.	Furniture Row Racing	Toyota
88	Alex Bowman	Hendrick Motorsports	Chevrolet
95	Kasey Kahne	Leavine Family Racing	Chevrolet
96	Parker Kligerman (i)	Gaunt Brothers Racing	Toyota
Official entry list

== Practice ==
=== First practice ===
Erik Jones was the fastest in the first practice session with a time of 1:10.467 and a speed of 125.165 mph (201.434 km/h).

Pos	No.	Driver	Team	Manufacturer	Time	Speed
1	20	Erik Jones	Joe Gibbs Racing	Toyota	1:10.467	125.165
2	18	Kyle Busch	Joe Gibbs Racing	Toyota	1:10.983	124.255
3	22	Joey Logano	Team Penske	Ford	1:11.328	123.654
Official first practice results

=== Final practice ===
Chase Elliott was the fastest in the final practice session with a time of 1:10.832 and a speed of 124.520 mph (200.396 km/h).

Pos	No.	Driver	Team	Manufacturer	Time	Speed
1	9	Chase Elliott	Hendrick Motorsports	Chevrolet	1:10.832	124.520
2	11	Denny Hamlin	Joe Gibbs Racing	Toyota	1:10.920	124.365
3	10	Aric Almirola	Stewart–Haas Racing	Ford	1:11.141	123.979
Official final practice results

== Qualifying ==
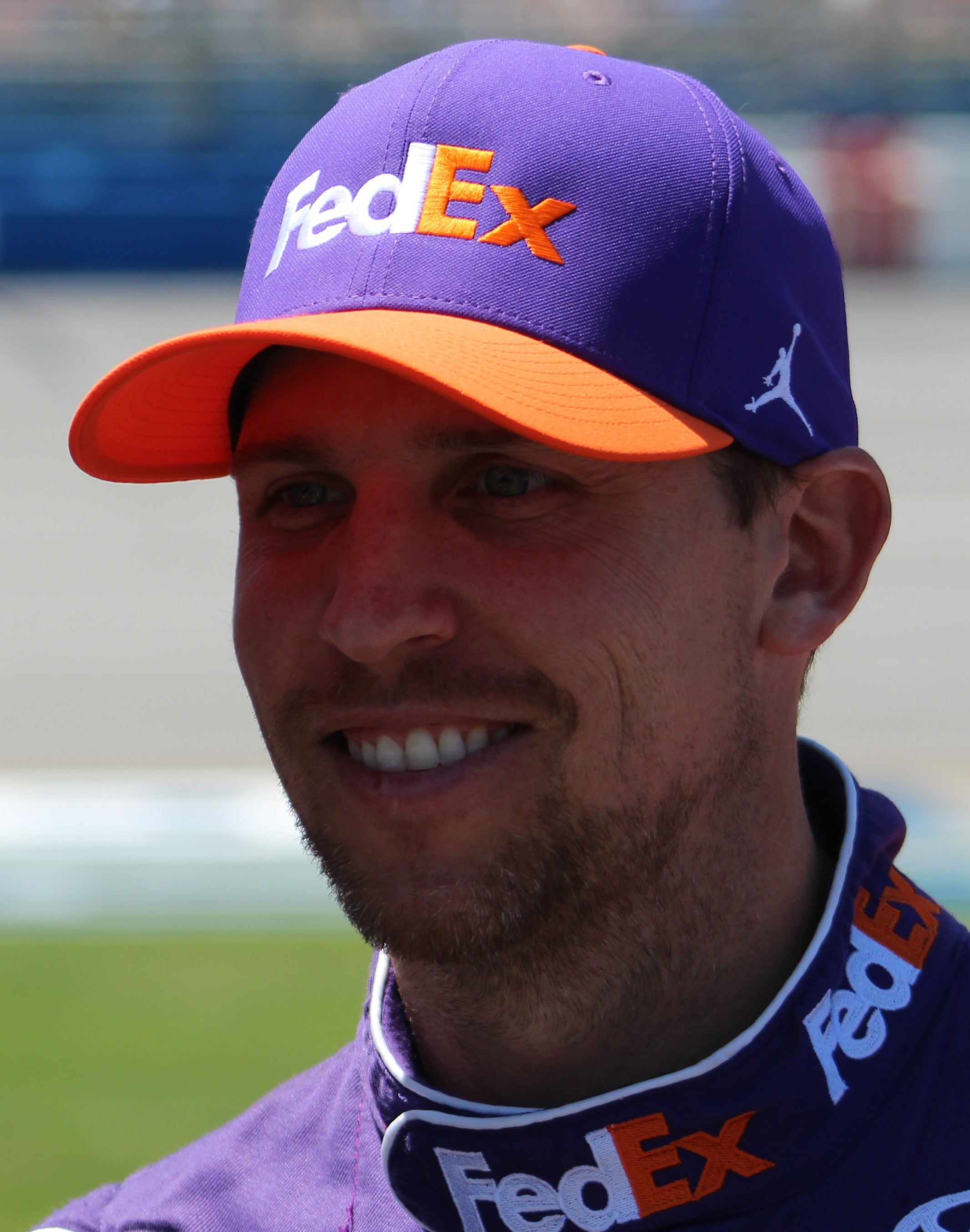
Denny Hamlin scored the pole position.

Denny Hamlin scored the pole for the race with a time of 1:10.260 and a speed of 125.534 mph (202.027 km/h).

=== Qualifying results ===
Pos	No.	Driver	Team	Manufacturer	R1	R2
1	11	Denny Hamlin	Joe Gibbs Racing	Toyota	1:10.919	1:10.260
2	18	Kyle Busch	Joe Gibbs Racing	Toyota	1:10.736	1:10.320
3	9	Chase Elliott	Hendrick Motorsports	Chevrolet	1:10.489	1:10.323
4	78	Martin Truex Jr.	Furniture Row Racing	Toyota	1:10.779	1:10.418
5	42	Kyle Larson	Chip Ganassi Racing	Chevrolet	1:10.961	1:10.687
6	22	Joey Logano	Team Penske	Ford	1:10.857	1:10.721
7	10	Aric Almirola	Stewart–Haas Racing	Ford	1:11.030	1:10.820
8	47	A. J. Allmendinger	JTG Daugherty Racing	Chevrolet	1:10.981	1:10.891
9	20	Erik Jones	Joe Gibbs Racing	Toyota	1:10.754	1:10.897
10	95	Kasey Kahne	Leavine Family Racing	Chevrolet	1:11.077	1:10.897
11	12	Ryan Blaney	Team Penske	Ford	1:11.035	1:10.951
12	34	Michael McDowell	Front Row Motorsports	Ford	1:11.051	1:10.969
13	48	Jimmie Johnson	Hendrick Motorsports	Chevrolet	1:11.085	—
14	1	Jamie McMurray	Chip Ganassi Racing	Chevrolet	1:11.161	—
15	4	Kevin Harvick	Stewart–Haas Racing	Ford	1:11.167	—
16	24	William Byron (R)	Hendrick Motorsports	Chevrolet	1:11.194	—
17	2	Brad Keselowski	Team Penske	Ford	1:11.196	—
18	14	Clint Bowyer	Stewart–Haas Racing	Ford	1:11.211	—
19	31	Ryan Newman	Richard Childress Racing	Chevrolet	1:11.233	—
20	37	Chris Buescher	JTG Daugherty Racing	Chevrolet	1:11.235	—
21	19	Daniel Suárez	Joe Gibbs Racing	Toyota	1:11.298	—
22	88	Alex Bowman	Hendrick Motorsports	Chevrolet	1:11.387	—
23	17	Ricky Stenhouse Jr.	Roush Fenway Racing	Ford	1:11.406	—
24	3	Austin Dillon	Richard Childress Racing	Chevrolet	1:11.589	—
25	38	David Ragan	Front Row Motorsports	Ford	1:11.617	—
26	6	Matt Kenseth	Roush Fenway Racing	Ford	1:11.871	—
27	96	Parker Kligerman (i)	Gaunt Brothers Racing	Toyota	1:12.038	—
28	32	Matt DiBenedetto	Go Fas Racing	Ford	1:12.201	—
29	43	Bubba Wallace (R)	Richard Petty Motorsports	Chevrolet	1:12.224	—
30	13	Ty Dillon	Germain Racing	Chevrolet	1:12.328	—
31	72	Cole Whitt	TriStar Motorsports	Chevrolet	1:12.791	—
32	15	Ross Chastain (i)	Premium Motorsports	Chevrolet	1:13.436	—
33	51	Josh Bilicki (i)	Rick Ware Racing	Ford	1:13.750	—
34	23	Spencer Gallagher (i)	BK Racing	Toyota	1:13.809	—
35	00	Landon Cassill	StarCom Racing	Chevrolet	1:14.934	—
36	41	Kurt Busch	Stewart–Haas Racing	Ford	DSQ	-
37	21	Paul Menard	Wood Brothers Racing	Ford	DSQ	-
Official qualifying results

== Race ==
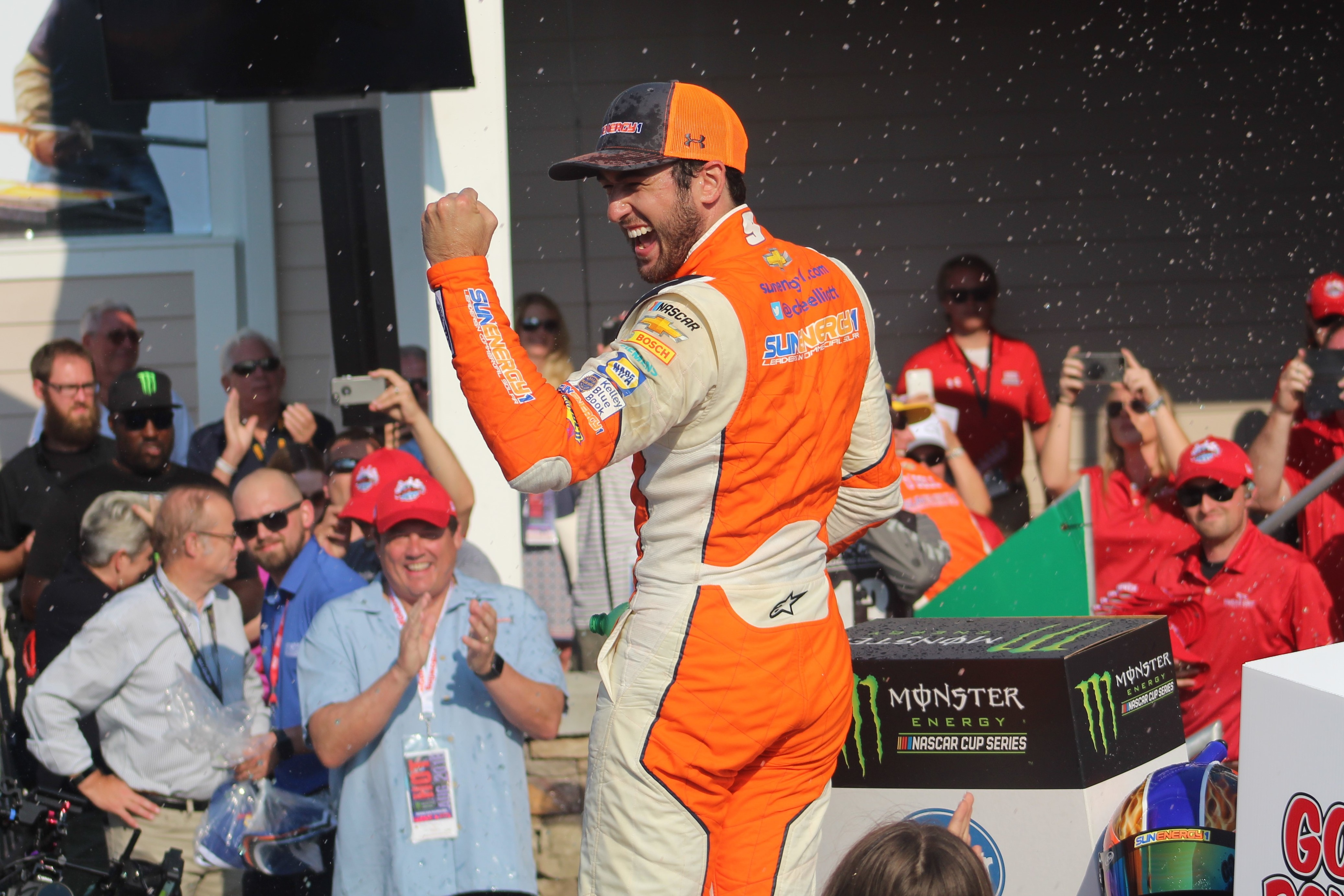
Chase Elliott scored his first career Cup Series win.

=== Stage Results ===
Stage 1 Laps: 20

Pos	No	Driver	Team	Manufacturer	Points
1	78	Martin Truex Jr.	Furniture Row Racing	Toyota	10
2	48	Jimmie Johnson	Hendrick Motorsports	Chevrolet	9
3	24	William Byron (R)	Hendrick Motorsports	Chevrolet	8
4	34	Michael McDowell	Front Row Motorsports	Ford	7
5	2	Brad Keselowski	Team Penske	Ford	6
6	31	Ryan Newman	Richard Childress Racing	Chevrolet	5
7	88	Alex Bowman	Hendrick Motorsports	Chevrolet	4
8	37	Chris Buescher	JTG Daugherty Racing	Chevrolet	3
9	21	Paul Menard	Wood Brothers Racing	Ford	2
10	6	Matt Kenseth	Roush Fenway Racing	Ford	1
Official stage one results

Stage 2 Laps: 20

Pos	No	Driver	Team	Manufacturer	Points
1	9	Chase Elliott	Hendrick Motorsports	Chevrolet	10
2	18	Kyle Busch	Joe Gibbs Racing	Toyota	9
3	11	Denny Hamlin	Joe Gibbs Racing	Toyota	8
4	20	Erik Jones	Joe Gibbs Racing	Toyota	7
5	78	Martin Truex Jr.	Furniture Row Racing	Toyota	6
6	1	Jamie McMurray	Chip Ganassi Racing	Chevrolet	5
7	4	Kevin Harvick	Stewart–Haas Racing	Ford	4
8	42	Kyle Larson	Chip Ganassi Racing	Chevrolet	3
9	12	Ryan Blaney	Team Penske	Ford	2
10	19	Daniel Suárez	Joe Gibbs Racing	Toyota	1
Official stage two results

=== Final Stage Results ===
Stage 3 Laps: 50

Pos	Grid	No	Driver	Team	Manufacturer	Laps	Points
1	3	9	Chase Elliott	Hendrick Motorsports	Chevrolet	90	50
2	4	78	Martin Truex Jr.	Furniture Row Racing	Toyota	90	51
3	2	18	Kyle Busch	Joe Gibbs Racing	Toyota	90	43
4	21	19	Daniel Suárez	Joe Gibbs Racing	Toyota	90	34
5	9	20	Erik Jones	Joe Gibbs Racing	Toyota	90	39
6	5	42	Kyle Larson	Chip Ganassi Racing	Chevrolet	90	34
7	14	1	Jamie McMurray	Chip Ganassi Racing	Chevrolet	90	35
8	16	24	William Byron (R)	Hendrick Motorsports	Chevrolet	90	37
9	36	41	Kurt Busch	Stewart–Haas Racing	Ford	90	28
10	15	4	Kevin Harvick	Stewart–Haas Racing	Ford	90	31
11	18	14	Clint Bowyer	Stewart–Haas Racing	Ford	90	26
12	11	12	Ryan Blaney	Team Penske	Ford	90	27
13	1	11	Denny Hamlin	Joe Gibbs Racing	Toyota	90	32
14	22	88	Alex Bowman	Hendrick Motorsports	Chevrolet	90	27
15	8	47	A. J. Allmendinger	JTG Daugherty Racing	Chevrolet	90	22
16	23	17	Ricky Stenhouse Jr.	Roush Fenway Racing	Ford	90	21
17	17	2	Brad Keselowski	Team Penske	Ford	90	26
18	12	34	Michael McDowell	Front Row Motorsports	Ford	90	26
19	19	31	Ryan Newman	Richard Childress Racing	Chevrolet	90	23
20	20	37	Chris Buescher	JTG Daugherty Racing	Chevrolet	90	20
21	10	95	Kasey Kahne	Leavine Family Racing	Chevrolet	90	16
22	7	10	Aric Almirola	Stewart–Haas Racing	Ford	90	15
23	30	13	Ty Dillon	Germain Racing	Chevrolet	90	14
24	27	96	Parker Kligerman (i)	Gaunt Brothers Racing	Toyota	90	0
25	29	43	Bubba Wallace (R)	Richard Petty Motorsports	Chevrolet	89	12
26	25	38	David Ragan	Front Row Motorsports	Ford	89	11
27	24	3	Austin Dillon	Richard Childress Racing	Chevrolet	89	10
28	37	21	Paul Menard	Wood Brothers Racing	Ford	89	11
29	26	6	Matt Kenseth	Roush Fenway Racing	Ford	89	9
30	13	48	Jimmie Johnson	Hendrick Motorsports	Chevrolet	89	16
31	35	00	Landon Cassill	StarCom Racing	Chevrolet	88	6
32	32	15	Ross Chastain (i)	Premium Motorsports	Chevrolet	77	0
33	28	32	Matt DiBenedetto	Go Fas Racing	Ford	75	4
34	31	72	Cole Whitt	TriStar Motorsports	Chevrolet	73	3
35	34	23	Spencer Gallagher (i)	BK Racing	Toyota	73	0
36	33	51	Josh Bilicki (i)	Rick Ware Racing	Ford	69	0
37	6	22	Joey Logano	Team Penske	Ford	1	1
Official race results

=== Race statistics ===
- Lead changes: 5 among different drivers
- Cautions/Laps: 4 for 11
- Red flags: 0
- Time of race: 2 hours, 13 minutes and 44 seconds
- Average speed: 98.928 miles per hour (159.209 km/h)

== Media ==
=== Television ===
NBC Sports covered the race on the television side. Rick Allen and Steve Letarte called in the regular booth for the race; Motor Racing Network broadcaster Mike Bagley called from the Esses, Dale Earnhardt Jr. had the call from Turn 5, and Jeff Burton called from Turns 6–7. Dave Burns, Marty Snider and Kelli Stavast reported from pit lane during the race.

NBC
Booth announcers	Turn announcers	Pit reporters
Lap-by-lap: Rick Allen; Color-commentator: Steve Letarte	Esses Announcer: Mike Bagley; Turn 5 Announcer Dale Earnhardt Jr. Turns 6–7 Announcer Jeff Burton	Dave Burns; Marty Snider; Kelli Stavast

=== Radio ===
Motor Racing Network had the radio call for the race, which was simulcast on Sirius XM NASCAR Radio.

MRN
Booth announcers	Turn announcers	Pit reporters
Lead announcer: Joe Moore; Announcer: Jeff Striegle; Announcer: Rusty Wallace	Esses: Dave Moody; Inner loop & Turn 5: Kurt Becker; Turn 10 & 11: Kyle Rickey	Alex Hayden; Winston Kelley; Steve Post

== Standings after the race ==
Drivers' Championship standings

	Pos	Driver	Points
	1	Kyle Busch	934
	2	Kevin Harvick	864 (–70)
	3	Martin Truex Jr.	813 (–121)
2	4	Kurt Busch	705 (–229)
	5	Clint Bowyer	703 (–231)
2	6	Joey Logano	691 (–243)
	7	Brad Keselowski	670 (–264)
	8	Kyle Larson	660 (–274)
	9	Denny Hamlin	650 (–284)
	10	Ryan Blaney	639 (–295)
1	11	Chase Elliott	619 (–315)
1	12	Aric Almirola	602 (–332)
1	13	Erik Jones	572 (–362)
1	14	Jimmie Johnson	563 (–371)
	15	Alex Bowman	523 (–411)
	16	Ricky Stenhouse Jr.	461 (–473)
Official driver's standings

Manufacturers' Championship standings

Pos	Manufacturer	Points
1	Toyota	810
2	Ford	775 (–35)
3	Chevrolet	715 (–95)
Official manufacturers' standings

- Note: Only the first 16 positions are included for the driver standings.
- . – Driver has clinched a position in the Monster Energy NASCAR Cup Series playoffs.

Previous race: 2018 Gander Outdoors 400	Monster Energy NASCAR Cup Series; 2018 season	Next race: 2018 Consumers Energy 400
