= ARCA races at Greenville-Pickens =

Motor race

NASCAR K&N Pro Series East
- Venue: Greenville-Pickens Speedway
- Location: Pickens County, South Carolina

Circuit information
- Surface: Asphalt
- Turns: 4

Stock car races in the now-ARCA Menards Series East had been held at Greenville-Pickens Speedway in Pickens County, South Carolina from 2006 until 2017.

== First race ==
Kevin Whitaker Chevrolet 150
NASCAR K&N Pro Series East
- Venue: Greenville-Pickens Speedway
- Location: Greenville, South Carolina; United States
- Corporate sponsor: Kevin Whitaker Chevrolet
- First race: 2006
- Last race: 2017
- Distance: 75 miles (120.721 km)
- Laps: 150
- Previous names: An American Revolution 150 (2006, 2008-2009); Greased Lightning 150 (2007); Kevin Whitaker Chevrolet 150 (2010-2017)

Circuit information
- Surface: Asphalt
- Length: 0.500 mi (0.805 km)
- Turns: 4

The Kevin Whitaker Chevrolet 150 was a NASCAR K&N Pro Series East race held annually from 2006 to 2017 at Greenville-Pickens Speedway. It was a 75-mile (121 km) race named after the facility's owner.

=== History ===
The speedway had two races held at the track from 2011 to 2014 and 2016.

=== Past winners ===
Year	Date	No.	Driver	Team	Manufacturer	Race distance		Race time	Average speed (mph)
Year	Date	No.	Driver	Team	Manufacturer	Laps	Miles	Race time	Average speed (mph)
2006	June 10	44	Sean Caisse	Andy Santerre Motorsports	Chevrolet	150	75 (120.721)	1:31:56	86.709
2007	April 28	20	Joey Logano	Joe Gibbs Racing	Chevrolet (2)	150	75 (120.721)	1:27:37	51.36
2008	April 19	3	Austin Dillon	Richard Childress Racing	Chevrolet (3)	156*	79.5 (127.942)	1:26:06	54.355
2009	April 11	15	Brian Ickler	Ickler Motorsports	Chevrolet (4)	150	75 (120.721)	1:22:09	54.778
2010	March 27	6	Bubba Wallace	Revolution Racing	Chevrolet (5)	156*	79.5 (127.942)	1:39:22	47.098
2011	April 2	00	Brett Moffitt	Michael Waltrip Racing	Toyota	150	75 (120.721)	1:21:20	55.328
2012	March 31	18	Bubba Wallace (2)	Joe Gibbs Racing (2)	Toyota (2)	150	75 (120.721)	1:10:59	63.395
2013	April 6	46	Brandon Gdovic	Precision Performance Motorsports	Toyota (3)	150	75 (120.721)	1:02:27	72.058
2014	March 22	41	Ben Rhodes	Turner Scott Motorsports	Chevrolet (6)	150	75 (120.721)	1:17:06	58.366
2015	April 5	9	William Byron	HScott Motorsports	Chevrolet (7)	152*	76 (122.31)	1:17:21	58.953
2016	March 26	5	Justin Haley	HScott Motorsports (2)	Chevrolet (8)	150	75 (120.721)	1:02:52	71.58
2017	April 8	40	Kyle Benjamin	MDM Motorsports	Toyota (4)	150	75 (120.721)	1:10:27	63.875

2008, 2010 and 2015: Race extended due to a green–white–checkered finish.

== Second race ==
Kevin Whitaker Chevrolet 140
NASCAR K&N Pro Series East
- Venue: Greenville Pickens Speedway
- Location: Greenville, South Carolina; United States
- Corporate sponsor: Kevin Whitaker Chevrolet
- First race: 2011
- Last race: 2016
- Distance: 70 miles (112.654 km)
- Laps: 140

Circuit information
- Surface: Asphalt
- Length: 0.500 mi (0.805 km)
- Turns: 4

The Kevin Whitaker Chevrolet 140 was a NASCAR K&N Pro Series East race that was held annually at Greenville-Pickens Speedway continuously from 2011 to 2014 and again in 2016.

=== History ===
The Kevin Whitaker Chevrolet 140 was added as a second Greenville-Pickens race to the K&N Pro Series East schedule in 2011, as the Kevin Whitaker Chevrolet 150 had been in existence since 2007.

=== Past winners ===
Year	Date	No.	Driver	Team	Manufacturer	Race distance		Race time	Average speed (mph)
Year	Date	No.	Driver	Team	Manufacturer	Laps	Miles (km)	Race time	Average speed (mph)
2011	September 10	4	Sergio Pena	Rev Racing	Toyota	140	70 (112.654)	0:59:06	71.066
2012	October 27	07	Corey LaJoie	Randy LaJoie Racing	Ford	146*	73 (117.482)	1:13:08	59.891
2013	September 2	98	Dylan Kwasniewski	Turner Scott Motorsports	Chevrolet	140	70 (112.654)	0:57:43	72.769
2014	September 6	22	Austin Hill	Austin Hill Racing	Ford	140	70 (112.654)	1:08:24	61.404
2015	Not held								
2016	September 5	40	Kyle Benjamin	Ranier Racing with MDM	Chevrolet	140	70 (112.654)	1:03:07	66.543

- 2012: Race extended due to overtime.
