= Bubba Wallace =

American racing driver (born 1993)

- Wallace at Las Vegas Motor Speedway in 2026
- Born: William Darrell Wallace Jr. October 8, 1993 (age 33); Mobile, Alabama, U.S.
- Achievements: 2025 Brickyard 400 Winner; 2025 The Duel at Daytona Winner; 2017 U.S. Short Track Nationals Super Late Model 100 Winner (inaugural race); Records; Highest finishing African-American in the Daytona 500 (2nd, 2018 and 2022); First African-American to win in the NASCAR Craftsman Truck Series (Martinsville, 2013); First African-American driver to win any major race on the Indianapolis Motor Speedway oval (2025 Brickyard 400)
- Awards: 2010 K&N Pro Series East Rookie of the Year; 2008 UARA-Stars Late Model Series Rookie of the Year

NASCAR Cup Series career
- 327 races run over 10 years
- Car no., team: No. 23 (23XI Racing)
- 2026 position: 11th
- Best finish: 10th (2023)
- First race: 2017 Axalta presents the Pocono 400 (Pocono)
- Last race: 2026 Season Finale 400 (Homestead)
- First win: 2021 YellaWood 500 (Talladega)
- Last win: 2025 Brickyard 400 (Indianapolis)
Wins	Top tens	Poles
3	77	3

NASCAR O'Reilly Auto Parts Series career
- 88 races run over 7 years
- 2022 position: 105th
- Best finish: 7th (2015)
- First race: 2012 Pioneer Hi-Bred 250 (Iowa)
- Last race: 2022 Pennzoil 150 (Indianapolis G.P.)
Wins	Top tens	Poles
0	36	2

NASCAR FedEx Freight Truck Series career
- 51 races run over 7 years
- 2023 position: 94th
- Best finish: 3rd (2014)
- First race: 2013 NextEra Energy Resources 250 (Daytona)
- Last race: 2023 Tyson 250 (North Wilkesboro)
- First win: 2013 Kroger 200 (Martinsville)
- Last win: 2017 LTi Printing 200 (Michigan)
Wins	Top tens	Poles
6	30	3

ARCA Menards Series career
- 1 race run over 1 year
- Best finish: 137th (2013)
- First race: 2013 Lucas Oil 200 (Daytona)
Wins	Top tens	Poles
0	0	0

ARCA Menards Series East career
- 37 races run over 4 years
- Best finish: 2nd (2011)
- First race: 2010 Kevin Whitaker Chevrolet 150 (Greenville-Pickens)
- Last race: 2018 Great Outdoors RV Superstore 100 (Watkins Glen)
- First win: 2010 Kevin Whitaker Chevrolet 150 (Greenville-Pickens)
- Last win: 2012 Kevin Whitaker Chevrolet 150 (Greenville-Pickens)
Wins	Top tens	Poles
6	26	4
- Statistics up to date as of November 8, 2026.

William Darrell "Bubba" Wallace Jr. (born October 8, 1993) is an American professional stock car racing driver. He competes full-time in the NASCAR Cup Series, driving the No. 23 Toyota Camry XSE for 23XI Racing.

Wallace was previously a development driver in Toyota's driver development program where he drove part-time for Joe Gibbs Racing in the Xfinity Series and full-time for Kyle Busch Motorsports in the Camping World Truck Series. He then moved over to Ford and their driver development program and competed full-time for Roush Fenway Racing in the Xfinity Series. After competing in select Cup Series races for Richard Petty Motorsports in their famous No. 43 as an injury replacement for Aric Almirola, Wallace became a full-time driver for RPM in the same car when Almirola left the team, which was his first full-time ride in the Cup Series.

Wallace has been the only full-time Black American driver in NASCAR's three national series (Cup, Xfinity, and Truck) each year he has competed in them.

== Racing career ==
=== Early career ===
Wallace started racing in the Bandolero and Legends car racing series, as well as local late model events, at the age of nine. In 2005, he won 35 of the Bandolero Series' 48 races held that year; in 2008, he became the youngest driver to win at Franklin County Speedway in Virginia.

=== NASCAR K&N Pro Series/Drive for Diversity ===
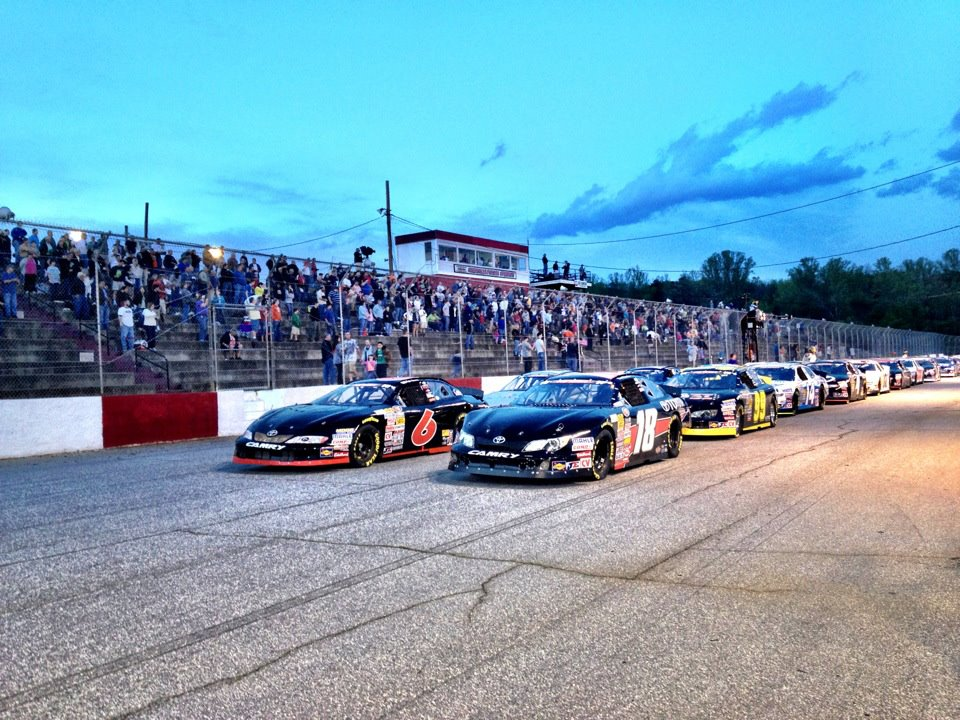
Wallace (No. 18) starting from the pole at Greenville-Pickens Speedway in 2012. Starting alongside him is the car he drove the prior year, the Rev Racing No. 6, now driven by Kyle Larson.

In 2010, Wallace began competing in the NASCAR K&N Pro Series East, a regional and developmental series. Wallace drove for Rev Racing as part of NASCAR's Drive for Diversity program, and was signed as a development driver for Joe Gibbs Racing. He won his very first race in the series, at Greenville-Pickens Speedway, becoming the youngest driver ever to win at the track, he was also the youngest driver to win in the series history, which began as the Busch North Series in 1987. He also won later in the year at Lee USA Speedway in New Hampshire, on his way to finishing third in series points and winning the series' Rookie of the Year award. He was the first African American to win the Rookie of the Year award in a NASCAR series. Wallace's 2011 season would see him winning three times, at Richmond International Raceway, Columbus Motor Speedway, and Dover International Speedway, and he finished second in points to Max Gresham.

Wallace moved to race directly for Joe Gibbs Racing for the 2012 season. Racing the entire K&N East Series season along with four to six selected races in the Nationwide Series, Wallace won the second East event of the year at Greenville-Pickens Speedway, his first win with JGR.

In 2018, Wallace returned to K&N East at Watkins Glen driving the No. 27 Chevrolet for Jefferson Pitts Racing to provide him with extra road course seat time before the Cup Series race later that weekend.

=== Xfinity Series ===
==== 2012 ====
Wallace made his national series debut in the Xfinity Series in late May, driving the No. 20 Dollar General Toyota for JGR at Iowa Speedway; he ran in the Top 10 for most of the event, finishing 9th. After posting further Top 10 finishes in his next two starts in the series, Wallace won his first career Nationwide Series pole at Dover International Speedway in late September.

==== 2014 ====
In 2014, he returned to the Nationwide Series for Joe Gibbs Racing in the No. 20, starting in May at Talladega Superspeedway where he would finish 34th after being involved in The Big One while running 13th. He ran only one more Nationwide race that year, at Daytona in July with Coca-Cola's "Share a Coke" campaign sponsoring where he would finish a strong 7th.

==== 2015 ====
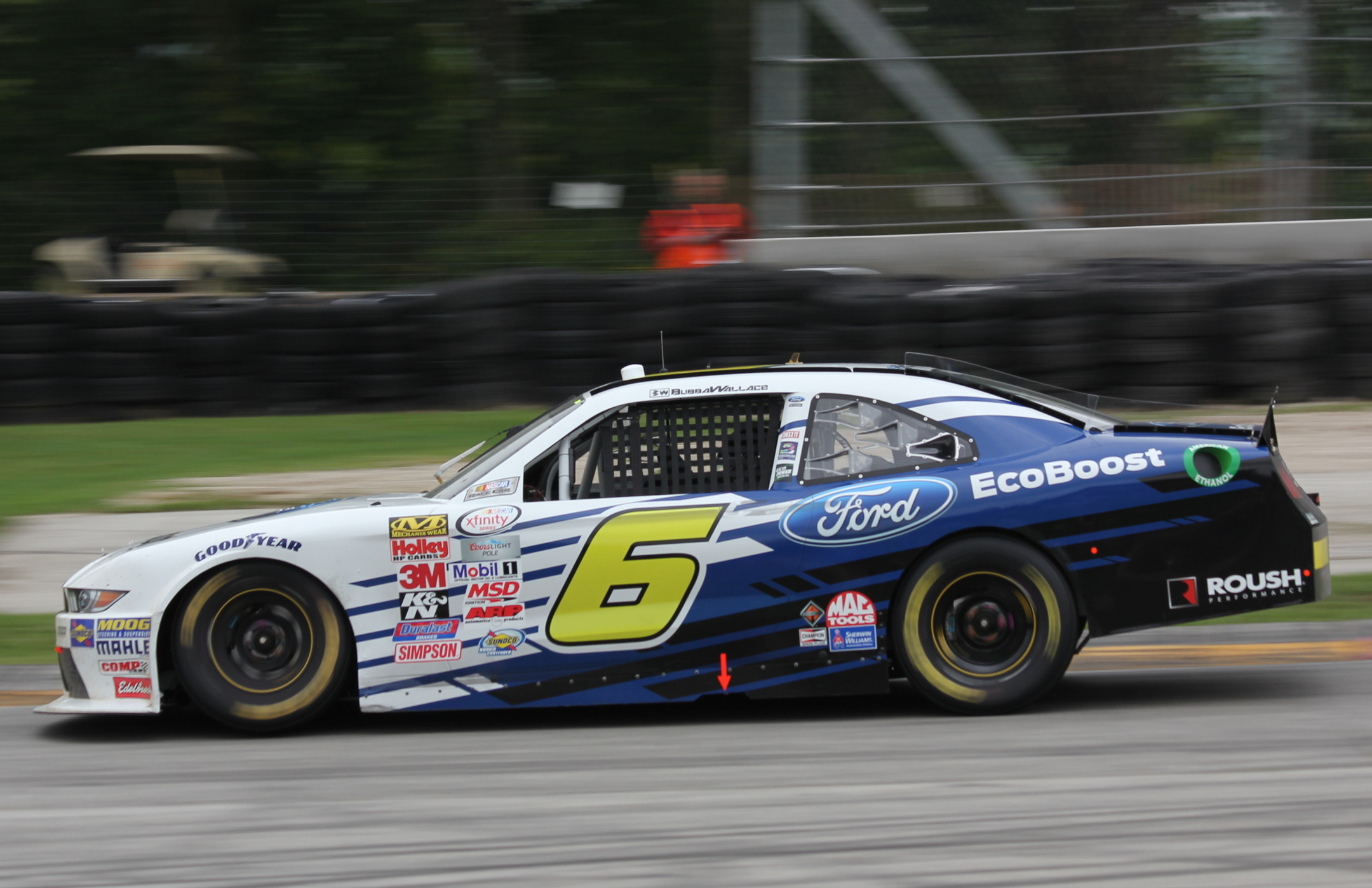
Wallace's No. 6 at Road America in 2015

Following the 2014 season, it was expected that Wallace would move up to the Xfinity Series with Joe Gibbs Racing in a full-time ride, with the owner Joe Gibbs claiming they would have "a big program" for the young driver. After the team struggled to find sponsorship for more than 15 races, on December 8, 2014, Wallace announced he had been granted his request to leave JGR and seek other opportunities. Later, it was reported he had signed a deal to compete in the Xfinity Series for Roush Fenway Racing for 2015 with Chad Norris as his crew chief. On December 18, 2014, RFR officially announced that they had signed Wallace to compete full-time in the No. 6 Ford Mustang in 2015, with sponsors and crew members to be announced at a later date. On January 28, 2015, at NASCAR Media Day, it was announced that Wallace would drive the No. 6 Ford EcoBoost Mustang. Wallace started the season with a 12th-place finish at Daytona and earned fourteen Top 10's to finish 7th in the final point standings. He was beaten by Daniel Suárez for Rookie of the Year by a single Top 10 finish.

==== 2016 ====
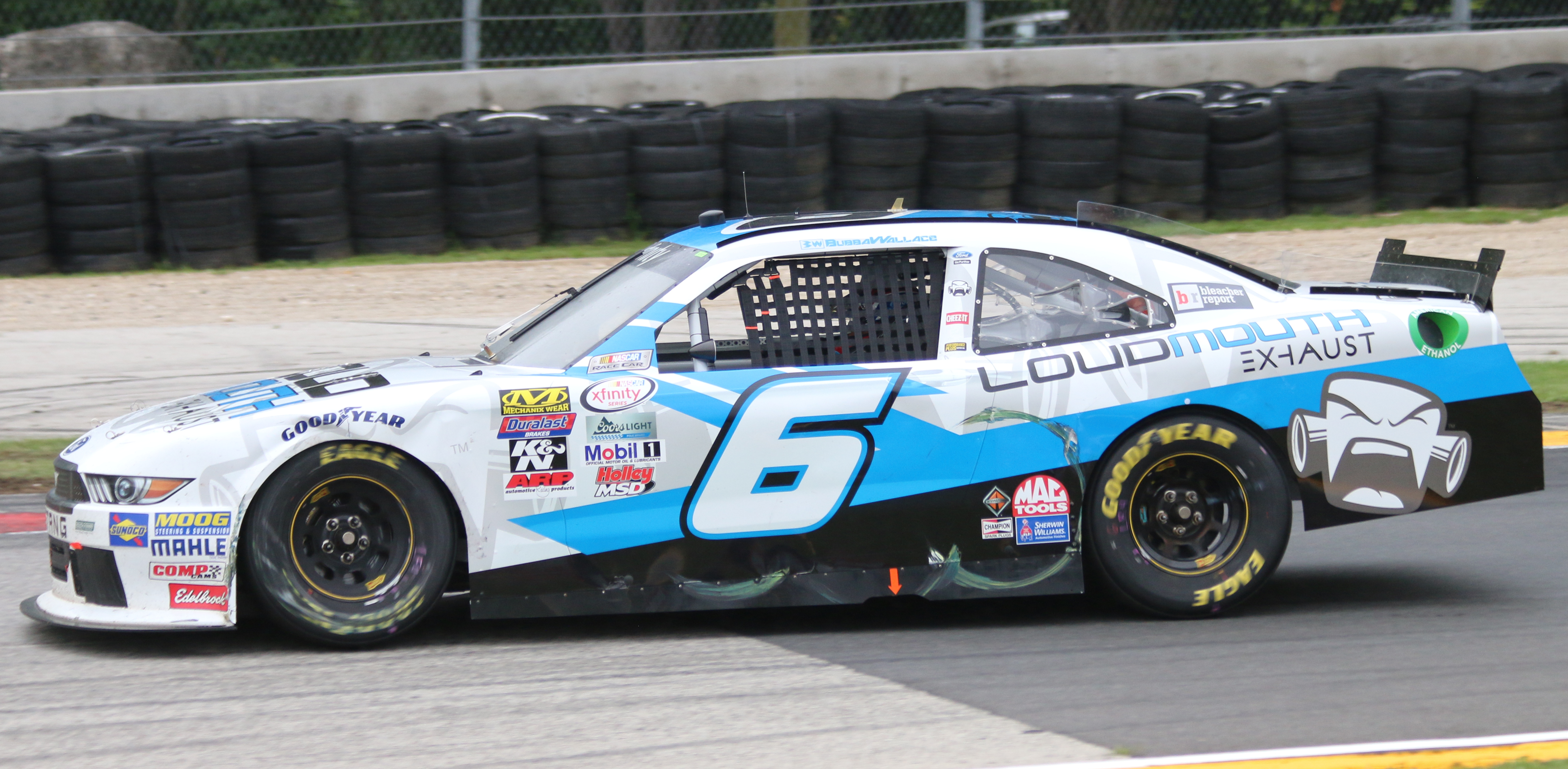
Wallace's No. 6 at Road America in 2016

Wallace finished 6th in the season opener at Daytona. He got his first Top 3 of the season at California Speedway, in which he claimed 3rd after a dramatic final lap saw long time leader Kyle Busch blow a tire giving the lead to Daniel Suarez temporarily as he would then run out of fuel just after passing Busch which then gave Busch back the lead, who was ultimately overtaken by Austin Dillon who would go onto win and Wallace would overtake Suarez, matching his career best finish, at the time, of 3rd. Wallace then earned his best career finish at Dover International Speedway finishing 2nd to the dominant Erik Jones but at the end of the season dropped to 11th overall in the points. Wallace did make the inaugural Xfinity Series chase and made it to the round of 8 before being eliminated after the penultimate race at Phoenix.

==== 2017 ====
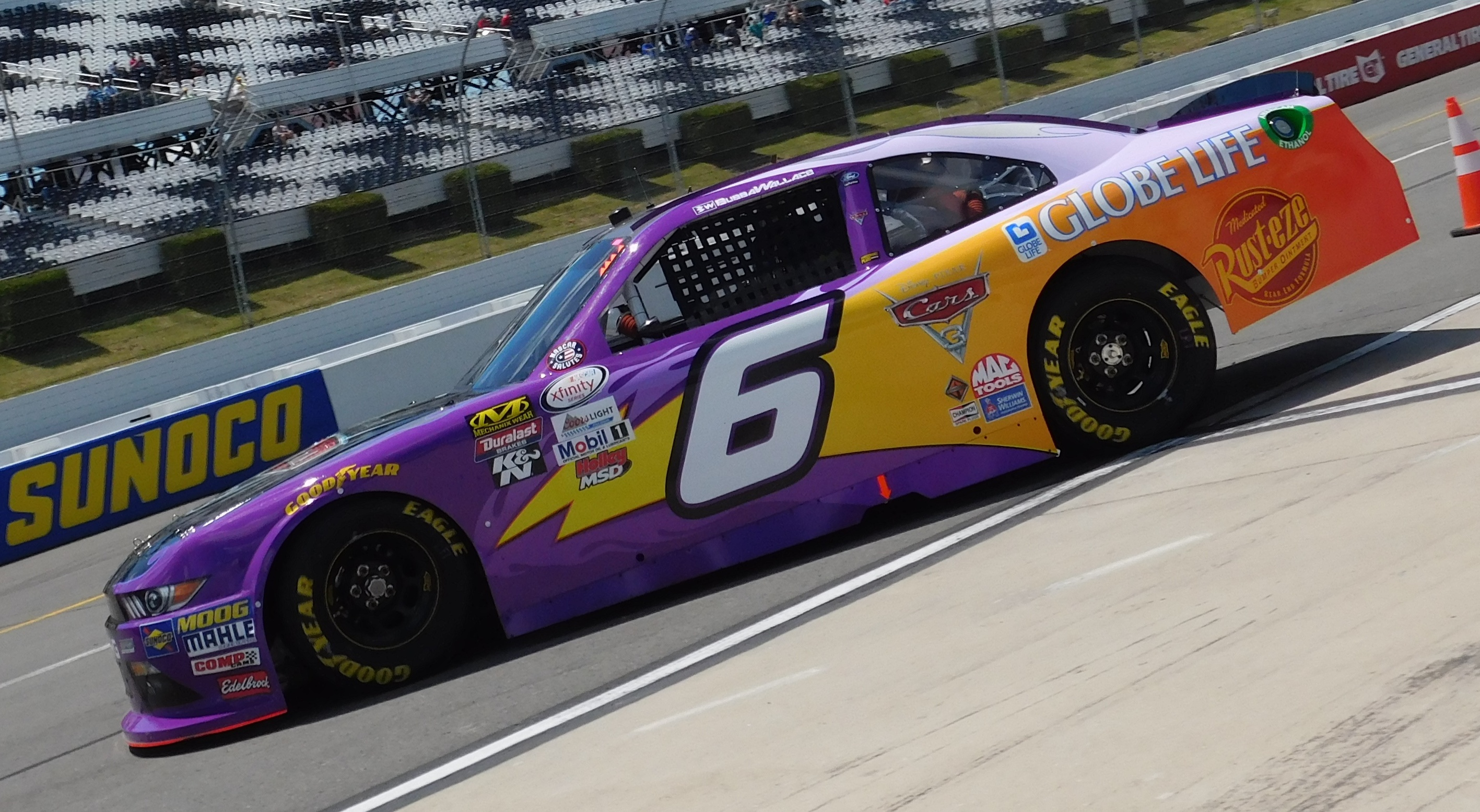
Wallace's No. 6 at Pocono in 2017; it was the last race for the car before it had to be closed down due to lack of sponsorship.

After finishing 33rd in the season-opening race at Daytona, Wallace finished in 6th-place five consecutive times. However, at Bristol, Wallace struggled. After starting from last, Wallace was trapped a lap down throughout the race, eventually getting caught up in a late crash. Wallace would finish 33rd. At Charlotte, Wallace would run upfront for a majority of the race, even leading for three laps, but a late-race pit stop relegated him behind the Top 10. Wallace got loose and hit the wall with a few laps to go, costing him a Top 10 and finishing 28th. However, despite being 4th in the Drivers' Championship standings, Roush Fenway announced that they would be suspending operations of Wallace's Xfinity Series team following the Pocono race weekend due to sponsorship issues.

Wallace signed with Biagi–DenBeste Racing to drive the No. 98 Ford at Chicagoland Speedway, where he would score a 10th-place finish.

=== NASCAR Craftsman Truck Series ===
==== 2013 ====
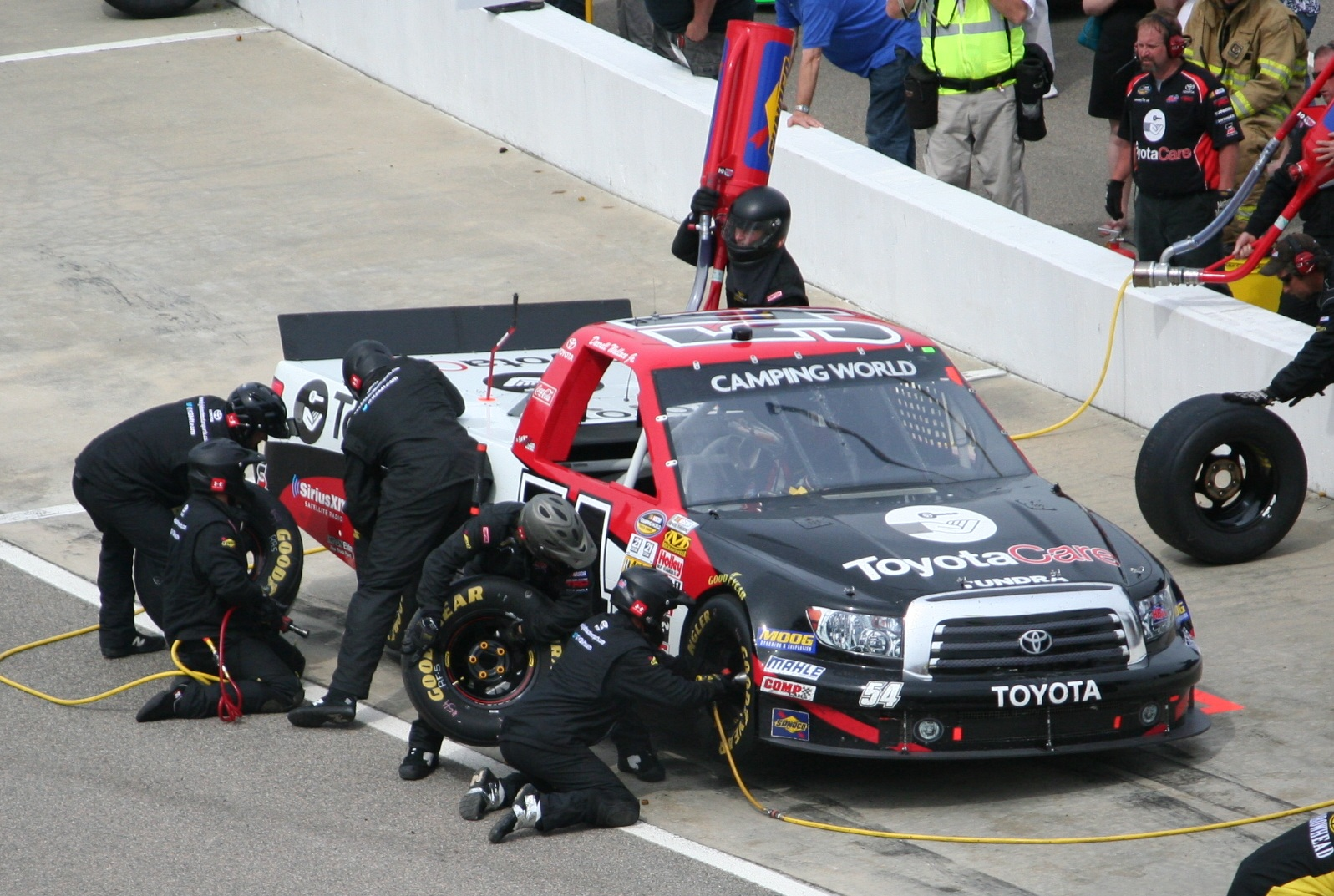
Wallace on pit road at Rockingham in 2013

In February 2013, it was announced that Wallace would run a full season in the Camping World Truck Series in the No. 54 Toyota owned by Kyle Busch Motorsports. At Rockingham Speedway in April Wallace, following accidental contact with Ron Hornaday Jr., was turned by Hornaday under a caution flag, his truck hitting the outside wall. Hornaday was penalized for the contact by being sent to the rear of the field; after the race, Hornaday was penalized 25 championship points and assessed a $25,000 fine, in addition to being placed on probation for the remainder of the season. The situation was compared to an incident at the 2011 WinStar World Casino 350K where Kyle Busch deliberately wrecked Hornaday at Texas Motor Speedway.

On October 26, 2013, Wallace became the first African-American driver to win in one of NASCAR's national series since 1963, winning the Camping World Truck Series Kroger 200 at Martinsville Speedway. The only previous win by an African-American driver was by Wendell Scott in the Grand National Division on December 1, 1963. Wallace finished eighth in points in his rookie season.

==== 2014 ====
In 2014, Wallace returned to the Camping World Truck Series full-time in the No. 54. In June, Wallace won the Drivin' for Linemen 200 at Gateway Motorsports Park. Three weeks later, he battled Kyle Larson and Ron Hornaday Jr. for the win at Eldora Speedway. Wallace held off a hard charging Larson, who wrecked his car trying to catch him, and beat Hornaday by a 5.489-second margin to win the second annual Mudsummer Classic. Wallace switched to the No. 34 for the Kroger 200 at Martinsville in tribute to Wendell Scott, and led the most laps en route to his second straight victory in the race. Wallace won his final race with KBM, the season finale at Homestead, beating Larson again to earn his first non-short track victory. Wallace's four wins, along with nine Top 5's and fourteen Top 10's, led to a 3rd-place finish in points.

==== 2017 ====
Wallace returned to the Camping World Truck Series at Michigan in August, driving the No. 99 Truck for MDM Motorsports, and ended up winning the race, holding off Christopher Bell and Kyle Busch who rounded out the Top 3. However, Wallace's truck was discovered to have had illegal vent holes, resulting in an L1-level penalty that suspended crew chief Shane Huffman for one race and penalized the No. 99 team ten points.

==== 2018 ====
In May, Wallace once again returned to the Truck Series, driving the No. 20 for Young's Motorsports at Kansas. He finished 14th after running out of fuel from 5th with four laps to go.

==== 2019 ====
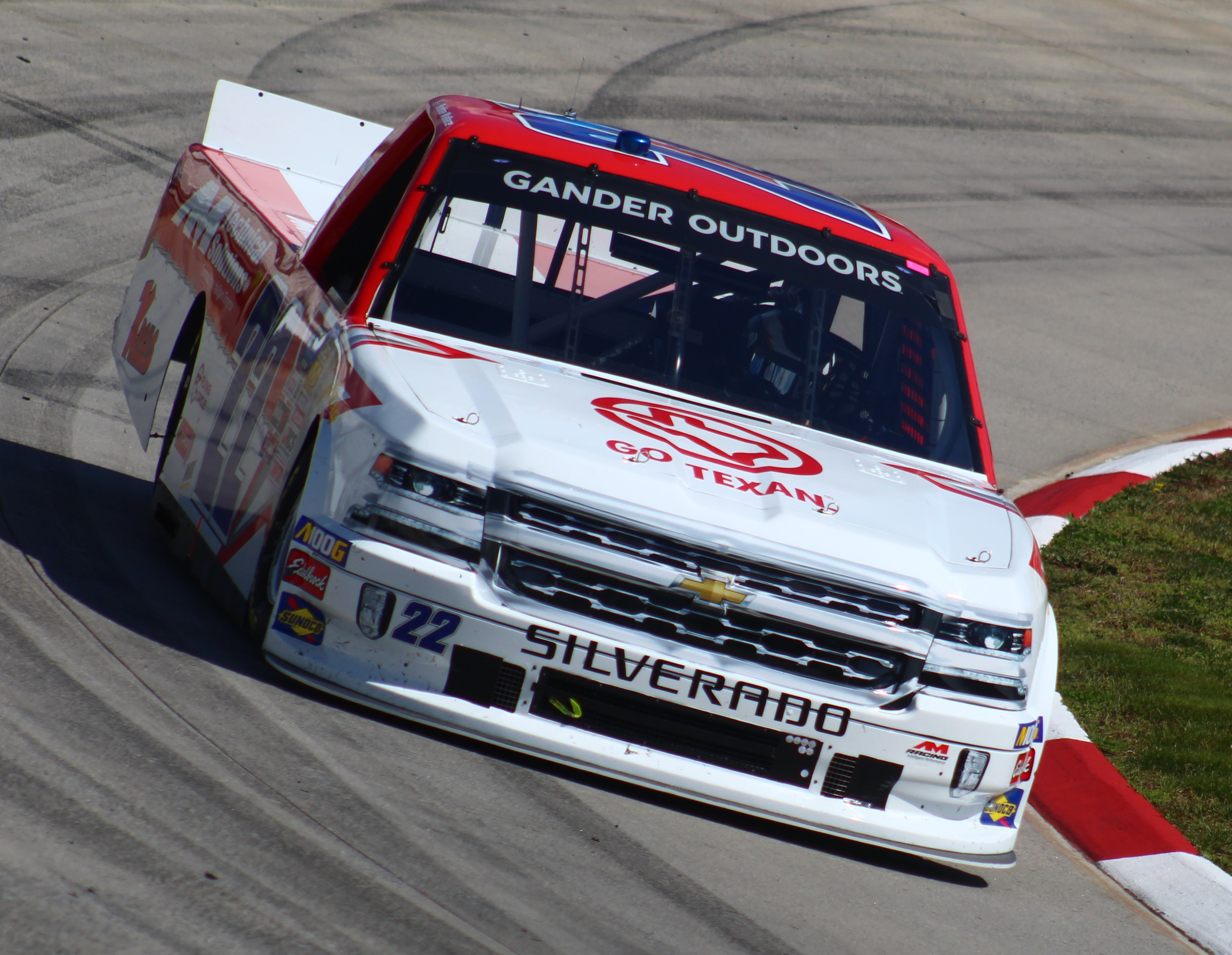
Wallace substituting for Austin Wayne Self in the AM Racing No. 22 at Martinsville in March 2019

In March, Wallace returned to the Truck Series for the TruNorth Global 250 at Martinsville and Vankor 350 at Texas, driving the No. 22 for AM Racing. He filled in for the team's driver/owner, Austin Wayne Self, following his suspension. Wallace would finish 10th and 20th, respectively, in these two races. Self would then be reinstated before the next race (at Dover) and he returned to his truck.

==== 2021 ====
In March 2021, Wallace joined Spencer Davis Motorsports to drive their No. 11 in the Pinty's Dirt Truck Race on Bristol Motor Speedway's dirt layout. For this race, the truck was fielded in a partnership with Hattori Racing Enterprises. He finished 11th in the race.

=== NASCAR Cup Series ===
==== 2017 ====
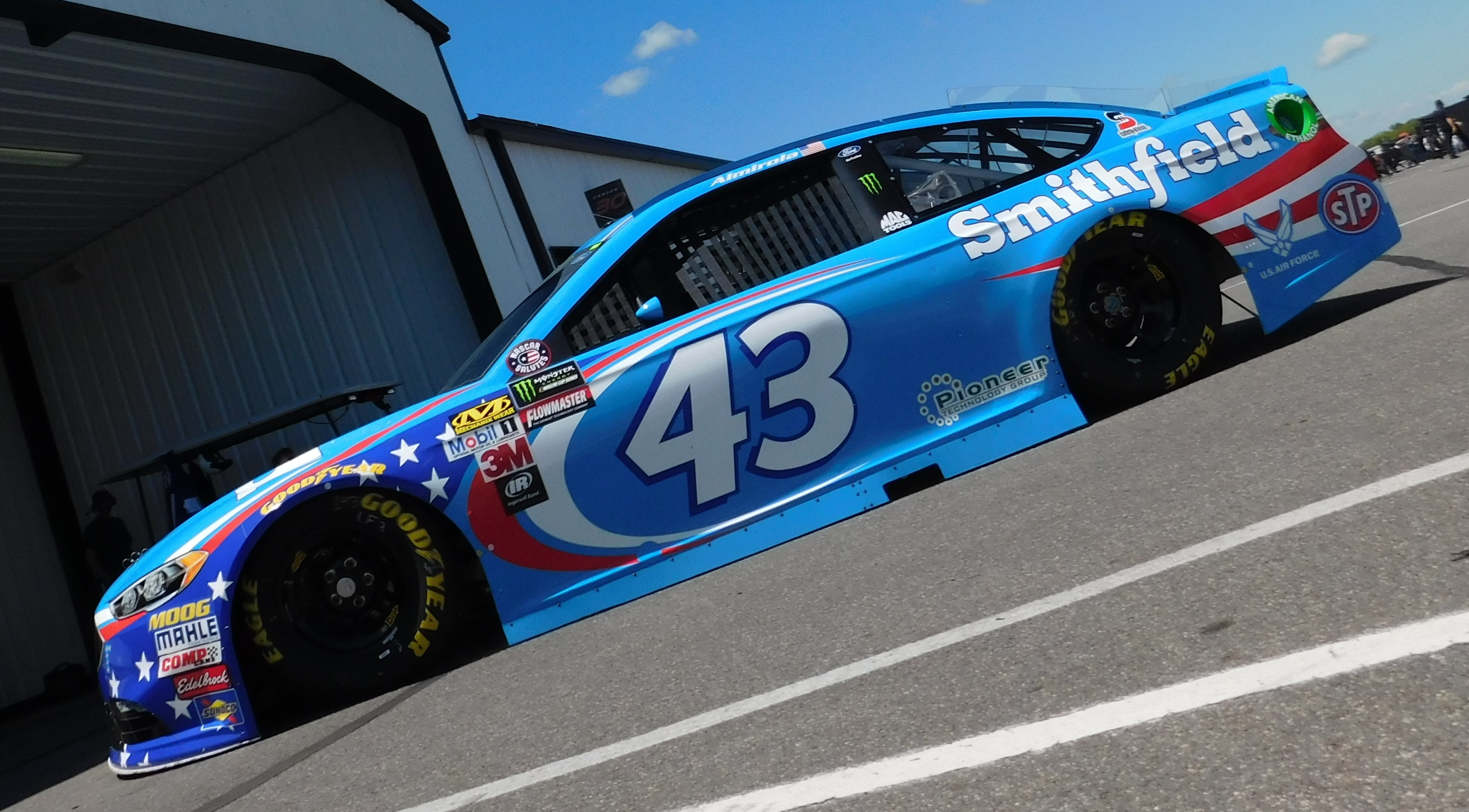
Wallace driving through the garage at his Cup Series debut race of Pocono in June 2017

On June 5, 2017, Richard Petty Motorsports announced plans to have Wallace drive the team's No. 43 Ford in place of injured Aric Almirola, making Wallace the first African-American to race in the Cup Series since Bill Lester in 2006. In qualifying for his Cup debut at the Pocono 400, he was able to advance to the second round and start 16th. During the race, Wallace suffered from speeding penalties on pit road, including one while he was serving an earlier pass-through penalty; at one point, he nearly missed his pit stall because he looked for his Xfinity pit sign instead of the No. 43. He went on to finish 26th and one lap down. After congratulating Ryan Blaney in Victory Lane, Wallace passed out and required medical attention. He later stated, "This is the third time this is happened. I get so pissed off at myself that I just pass out."

Wallace earned a finish of 11th at Kentucky after being involved in a last-lap wreck.

==== 2018 ====
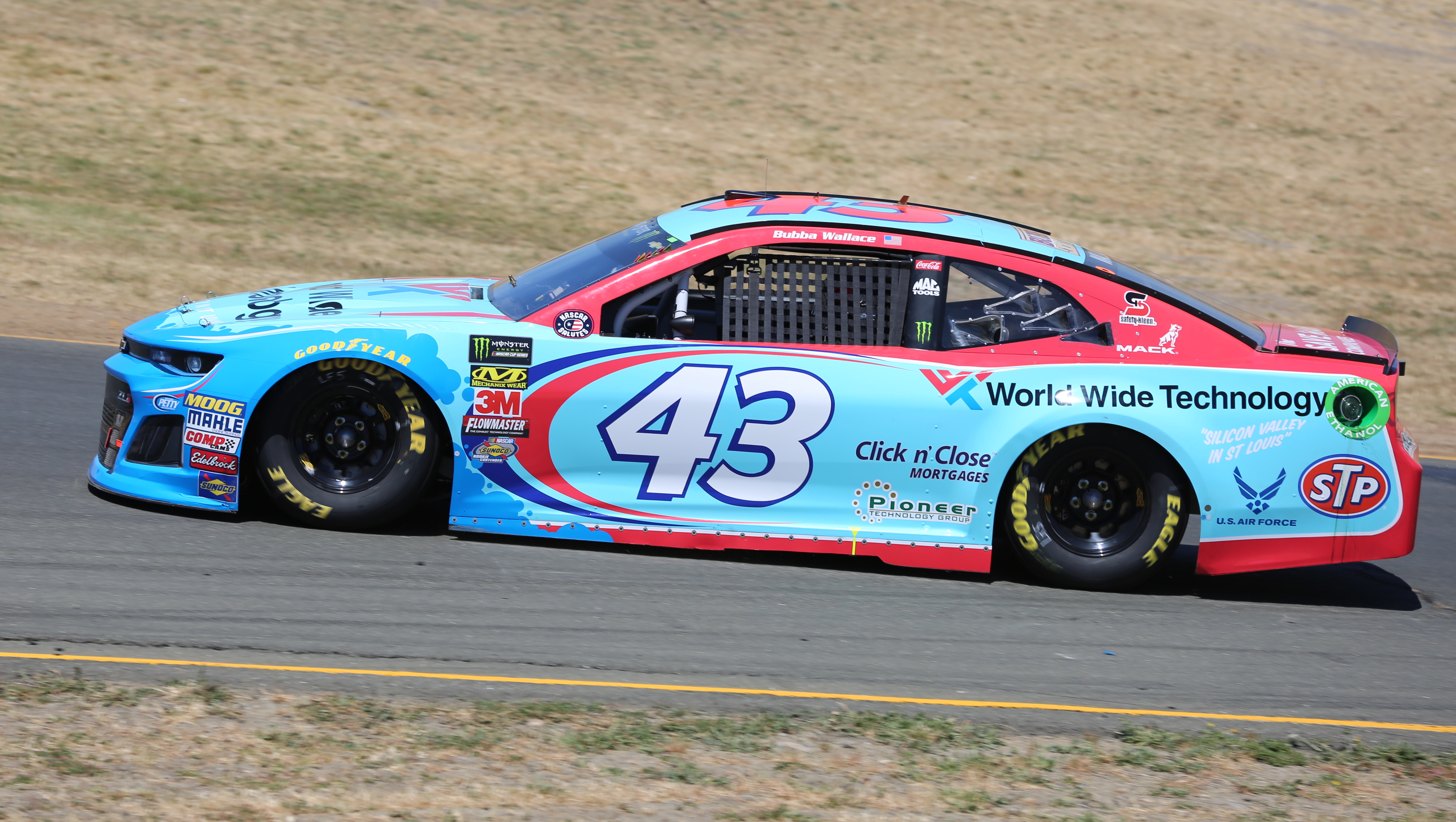
Wallace's No. 43 at Sonoma Raceway in 2018

After Aric Almirola announced his departure from Richard Petty Motorsports, team owner Richard Petty announced in an interview that he and the team were working on hiring Wallace as the new driver of the No. 43 in 2018. Wallace was officially introduced to the team as their new driver on October 25, 2017. He is the first African-American driver to have a full-time Cup ride since Wendell Scott in 1971.

Prior to the season-opening Daytona 500, Wallace received support from National Baseball Hall of Famer Hank Aaron and Formula One driver Lewis Hamilton. He drove the No. 43 Chevrolet Camaro to finish 2nd behind Austin Dillon, the highest finish by a full-time rookie driver in race history, after beating Denny Hamlin to the start/finish line by .002 seconds. Wallace, however, scored only two additional Top 10 finishes at the spring Texas race and the fall Phoenix race. He finished 28th-place in the final point standings.

In October 2018, Wallace was named in Ebony magazine's Power 100 list, joining the ranks of Stephen Curry, Antonio Brown, Venus Williams and former president and First Lady Barack and Michelle Obama.

==== 2019 ====
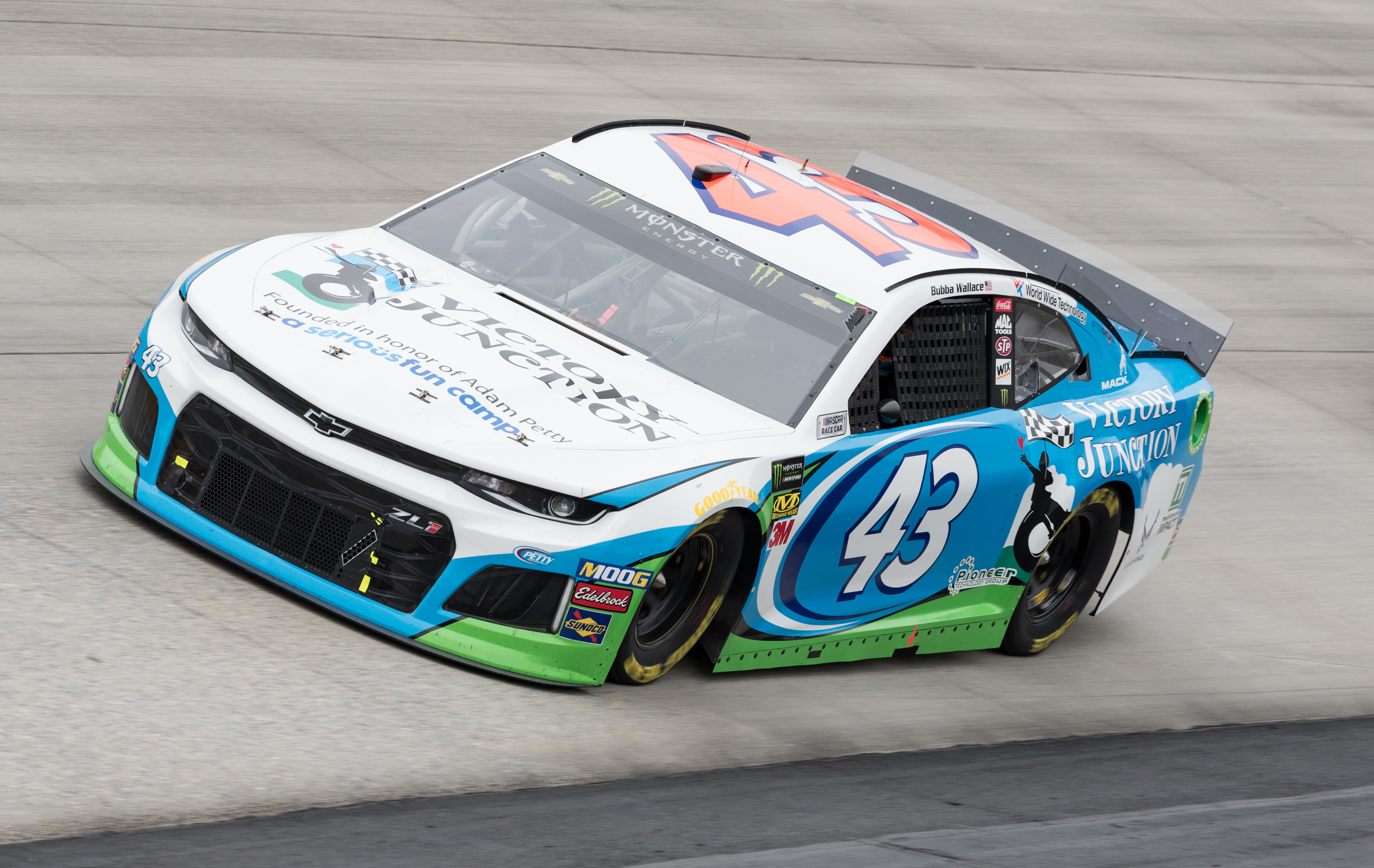
Wallace's No. 43 during the race at Dover in October 2019

Despite continuing to have mediocre finishes in the 2019 season, Wallace displayed his full potential with RPM at the 2019 Monster Energy NASCAR All-Star Race by winning the second stage of the Monster Energy Open and finishing 5th in the All-Star Race. His other highlight of the early-to-mid summer was at Watkins Glen, when he spun Kyle Busch off the track on lap 61.

At the Brickyard 400, Wallace had one of the best runs of his career by finishing 3rd after running in the top ten all day long. He continued to show improvements to his finishes during the season, notably at Richmond, where he started 37th and finished 12th.

At the Charlotte Roval, Wallace finished 24th after Alex Bowman spun him out on lap 42 after Wallace gave Bowman the middle finger gesture on several laps. Wallace retaliated after the race by splashing water on Bowman's face. NASCAR Executive Vice President and Chief Racing Development Officer Steve O'Donnell said on Sirius XM NASCAR Radio that officials plan to have a conversation with Wallace about the altercation. On October 5, 2019, Wallace apologized to Jeff Gordon, AMR NASCAR Safety medical director Dr. Angela Fiege, and Hendrick Motorsports executive Jeff Andrews for getting them splashed during the incident, but stated that he does not regret what he did to Bowman.

On November 9, 2019, Wallace was fined $50,000 and docked fifty points for intentionally manipulating competition at Texas when he spun his car on the track after experiencing a tire failure. He once again finished 28th in the final points standings.

==== 2020 ====
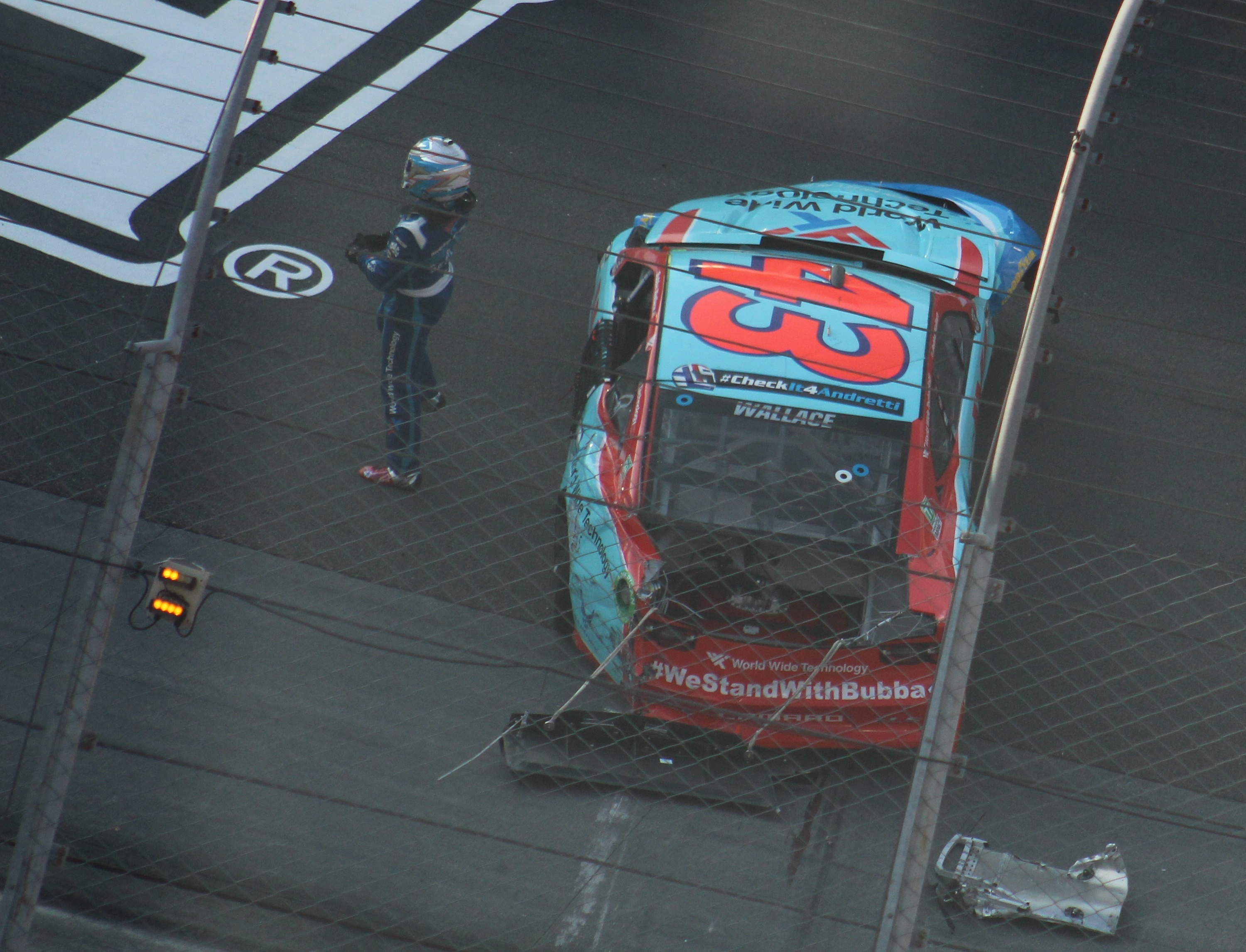
Wallace after climbing out of his No. 43 car following his crash with Michael McDowell in the All-Star Open

For the 2020 season, Wallace was reunited with crew chief Jerry Baxter, who worked with him in the Truck Series. In the Pennzoil 400 at Las Vegas, Wallace finished 6th for his best finish on a 1.5-mile track. When the season was halted after four races due to the COVID-19 pandemic, he was 18th in points.

During the stoppage, he participated in the NASCAR-sanctioned eNASCAR iRacing Pro Invitational Series, where he made headlines at the sim racing league's Bristol event for quitting early by choice after wrecking on the eleventh lap. Wallace responded to fan criticism by mocking how easily they got offended over a video game. In response, his main sponsor, Blue-Emu, dropped its sponsorship of the virtual No. 43 car. Blue-Emu executive vice president Ben Blessing said that Wallace's outburst would have been unacceptable during a physical race. As Blessing saw it, Wallace's outburst was not the act of a NASCAR driver, but of "someone like my 13-year-old son who broke his controller playing some game where he builds houses." Later in the Pro Invitational season, after initially posting a tweet seeking a spotter for the event at Talladega, Wallace announced that he would "opt-out," stating that practicing for the iRacing events was too difficult: "I simply get burnt out after a day. Not the games fault, just been like that for years."

Wallace scored a second Top 10 finish in the Supermarket Heroes 500 at Bristol after starting 36th. Further top-tens came in the Brickyard 400 at Indianapolis and FireKeepers Casino 400 at Michigan with 9th-place finishes in both. In the regular season-ending Coke Zero Sugar 400 at Daytona, he recorded a 5th-place finish despite being involved in a late-race wreck.

On September 10, 2020, Wallace announced he would leave RPM at the end of the 2020 season. He finished 22nd in the final points standings.

==== 2021: 23XI Racing and first career win ====
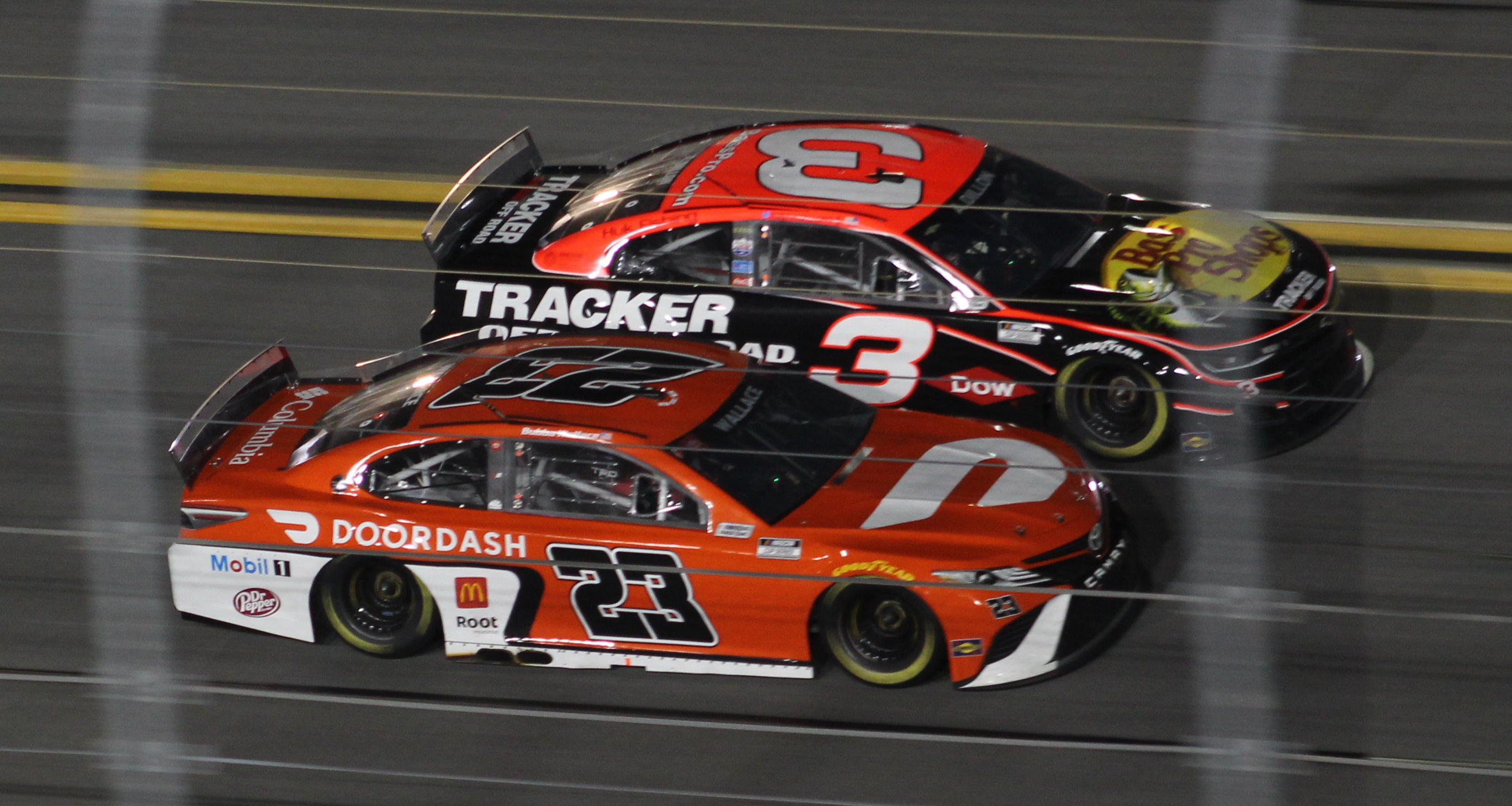
Wallace (No. 23) racing alongside Austin Dillon (No. 3) in Bluegreen Vacations Duel #2, which they would finish 1–2 in.

On September 21, 2020, Michael Jordan announced he and NASCAR veteran Denny Hamlin had created a NASCAR team, named 23XI Racing with Wallace serving as the first driver in the No. 23. Wallace was replaced by Ty Dillon in the 2021 Busch Clash as Wallace was not eligible to compete in the race. After qualifying 4th for the Daytona 500, he finished 2nd in his Bluegreen Vacations Duel to Austin Dillon. He was classified 17th in the Daytona 500 after being involved in a fiery last-lap wreck. Wallace scored a 2nd-place finish at the August Daytona Race. He originally placed 3rd, but due to a post-race car inspection failure on the No. 17 car of Chris Buescher, his result was increased to 2nd, equaling his best ever Cup Series result at the 2018 Daytona 500. On October 4, 2021, Wallace earned his first career Cup win at Talladega after the race was shortened due to rain. Wallace is the first African-American driver to win a Cup Series race since Wendell Scott in 1963. Wallace also scored the first win for a McDonald's-sponsored car since Jimmy Spencer in 1994.

==== 2022: Second career win and race suspension ====
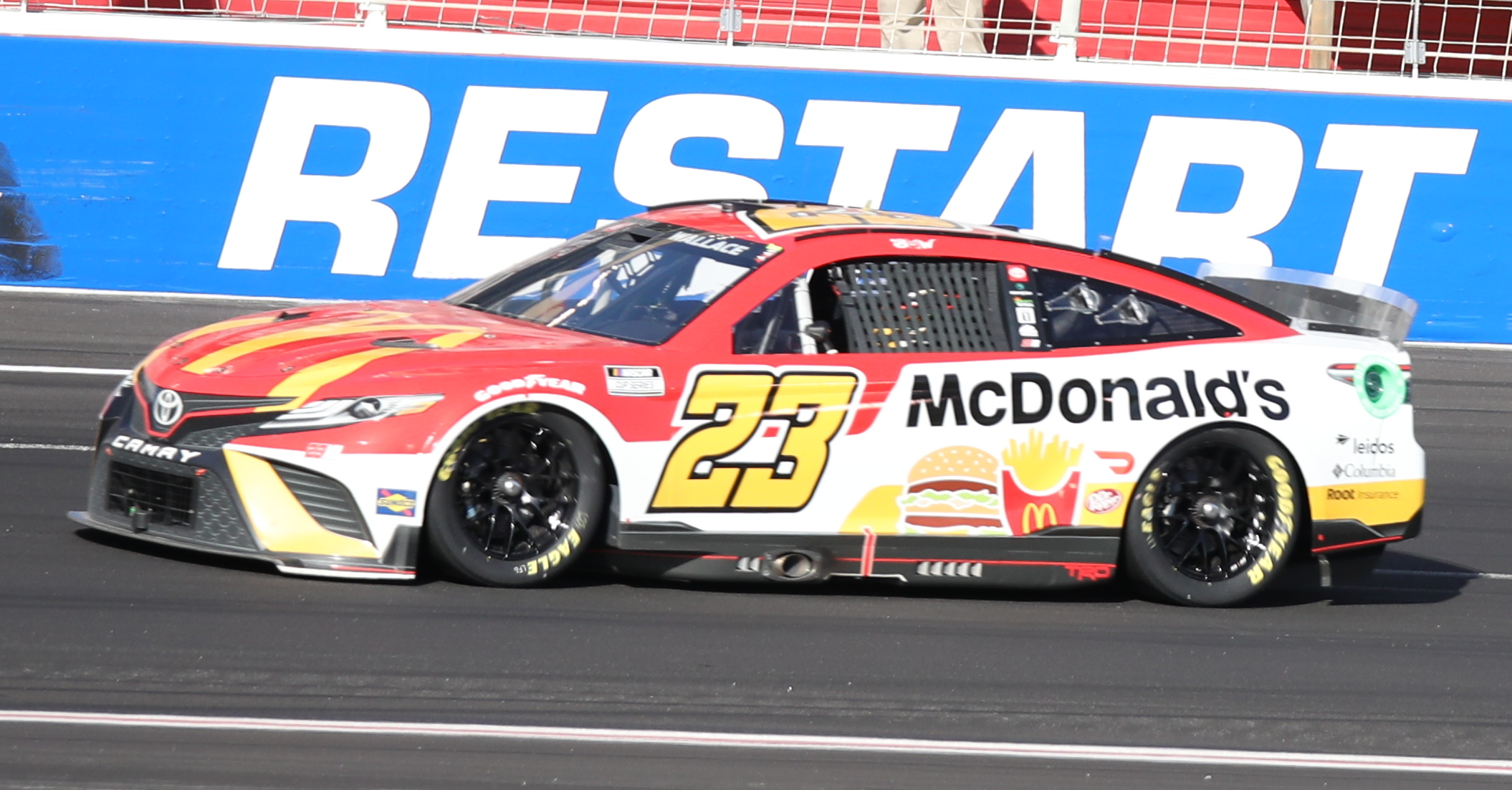
Wallace's No. 23 at Atlanta Motor Speedway in 2022

Wallace continued with 23XI Racing alongside new teammate Kurt Busch. He raced at the 2022 Daytona 500 with a full McDonald's sponsored paint scheme, finishing runner-up to Austin Cindric by 0.036 seconds. Wallace was in contention late in the race at Atlanta, but would finish 13th after being involved in a wreck on the last lap. On March 29, 2022, crew chief Bootie Barker was suspended for four races due to a tire and wheel loss during the 2022 Texas Grand Prix at COTA. Dave Rogers was announced as Wallace's crew chief for Richmond, Martinsville, Bristol, and Talladega. At Michigan, Wallace won his first career pole and finished 2nd to Kevin Harvick. Following the final regular season race at Daytona Wallace, in a must-win situation, failed to qualify for the Playoffs. However, on August 31, 2022, it was announced that Bubba, along with crew chief Barker, would switch rides at 23XI for the remainder of the season, as they move over to the No. 45 car as it seeks the owner's championship. On September 11, Wallace scored his second win at Kansas after leading the final 67 laps and holding off Hamlin. At Las Vegas, Kyle Larson charged aggressively past Kevin Harvick and Wallace, causing Wallace to scrape the outside wall. Wallace retaliated with a right rear hook on Larson, wrecking both cars down the front stretch and severely damaging Christopher Bell's car in the process. During the caution, Wallace engaged in a shoving match with Larson. Wallace was suspended for one race for the incident; John Hunter Nemechek was assigned to drive the No. 45 at Homestead. He ended the campaign nineteenth in the drivers' standings.

==== 2023: Making the playoffs ====
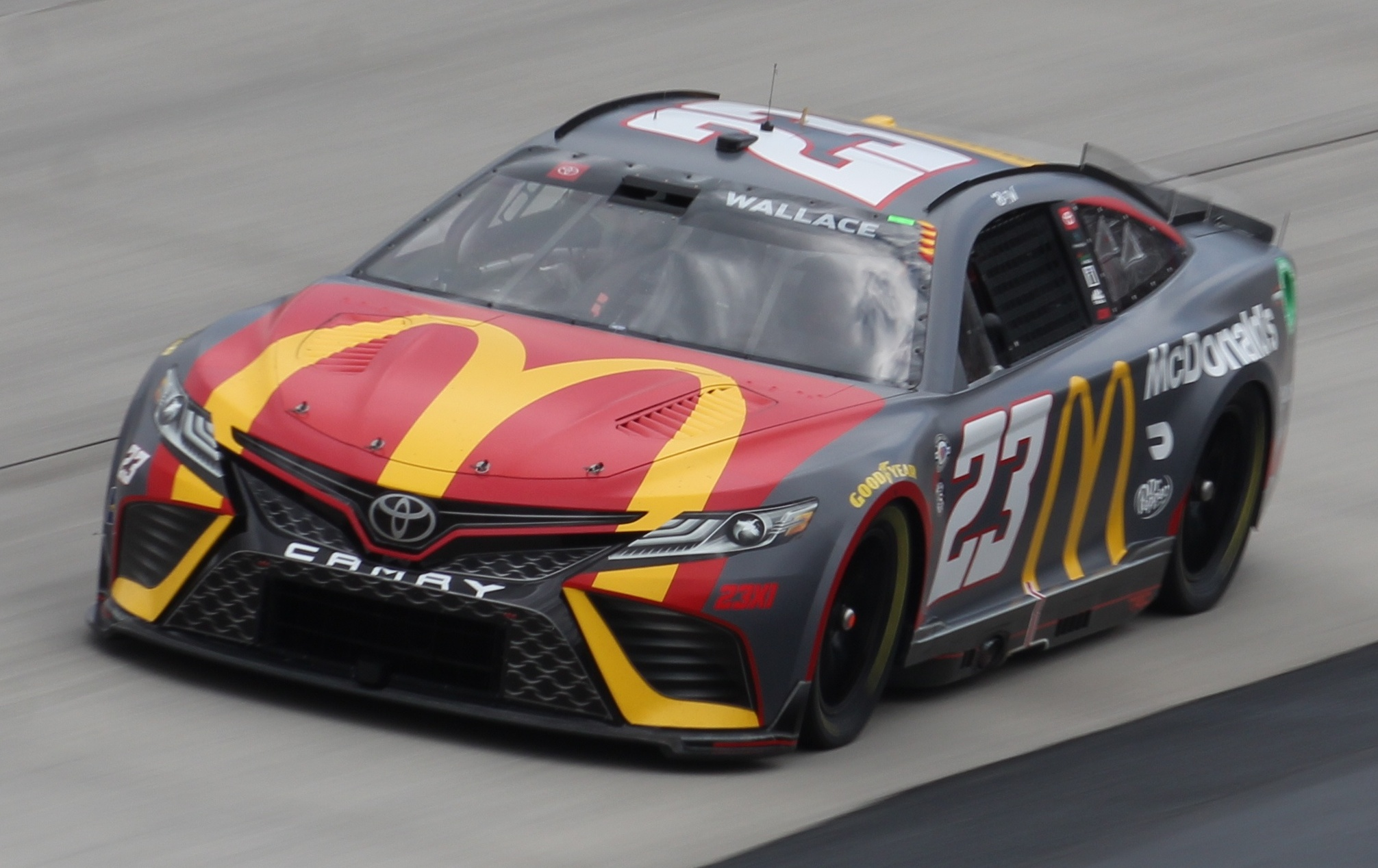
Wallace's No. 23 car at Dover Motor Speedway in 2023

Wallace started the 2023 season with a 20th-place finish at the 2023 Daytona 500. He improved his finishes enough to make the playoffs for the first time in his career. Although improving to 10th in the overall points, achieving five Top 5 finishes, and ten Top 10 finishes, 2023 was the first winless season for Wallace since his first win at Talladega in 2021. Wallace advanced to the Round of 12 following the Bristol night race after Joey Logano and Kevin Harvick were eliminated due to issues late in the race. He was eliminated from the Round of 12 at the conclusion of the Charlotte Roval race.

==== 2024: Playoff challenges, winless season, and crew changes ====
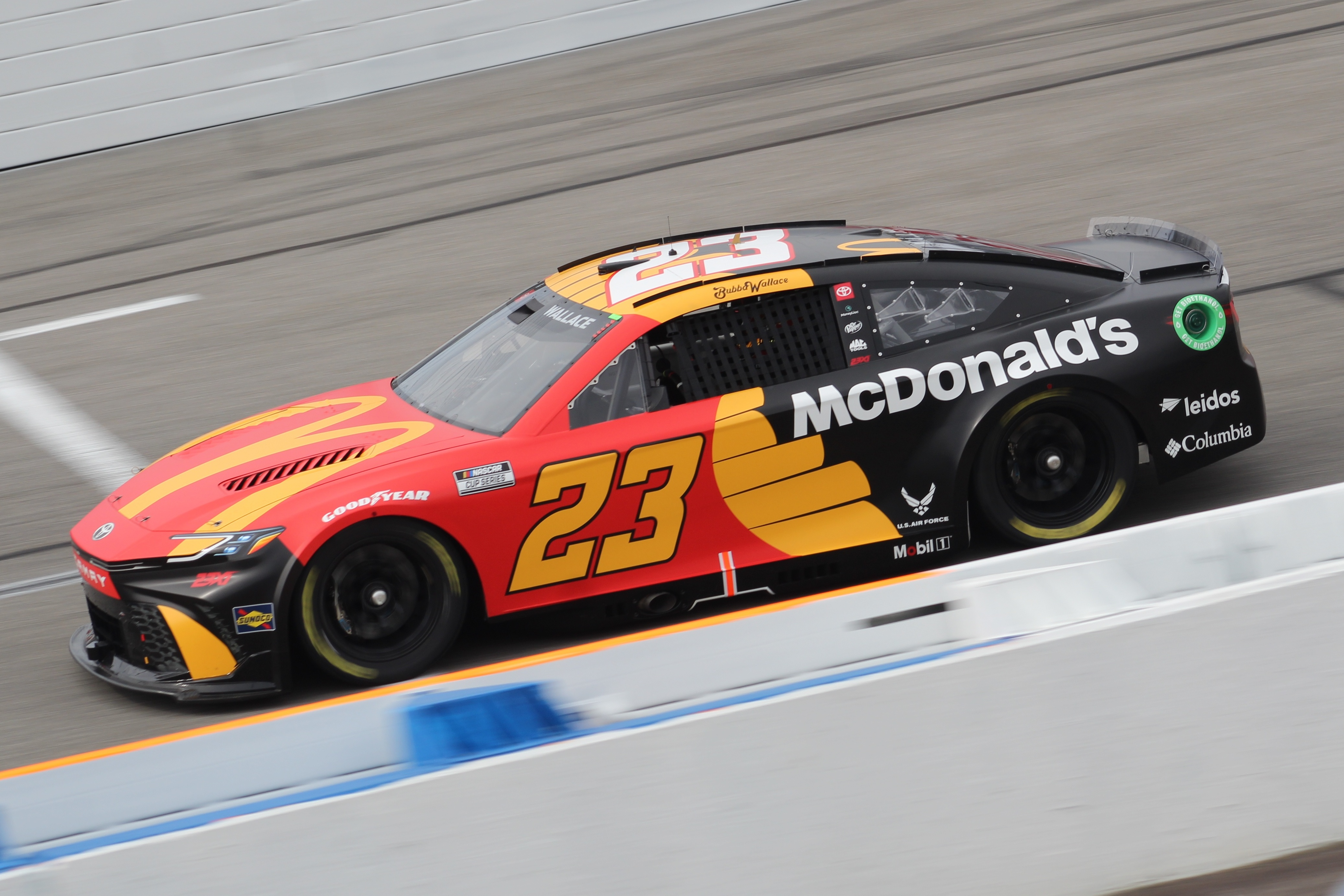
Wallace’s No. 23 car at Richmond Raceway in 2024

Wallace had an impressive start to 2024, achieving two 5th-place finishes in the first two races of the season. However, following a 35th-place finish at Las Vegas, Wallace struggled to regain competitiveness for the next five races until a 4th-place finish at Martinsville Since Martinsville, Wallace finished three times in the Top 10 at Texas, Darlington, and Nashville. At the Chicago Street Race on July 7, Wallace was involved in a spin after he got turned by Alex Bowman, who would later go on to win that very same race. After the race, Wallace intentionally collided with Bowman's car during the cool-down lap. Per NASCAR, Wallace, "driver of the No. 23 23XI Racing Toyota, was fined $50,000 for violating Sections 4.4.B & D: NASCAR Member Code of Conduct, and finished the race in 13th and currently sits 17th in the playoff standings, 45 points underneath the elimination line for the 16-driver field." Despite scoring decent finishes during the regular season, Wallace failed to make the playoffs after Chase Briscoe won at Darlington. Following the Martinsville playoff race, the No. 23 was docked fifty owner and driver points and Wallace and the team were each fined US$100,000 for race manipulation, when Wallace faked a tire failure and slowed down to allow fellow Toyota driver Christopher Bell to pass him in an attempt to make the Championship 4. In addition, Barker was suspended for the Phoenix finale. Despite a promising early season, Wallace finished the 2024 NASCAR season in 18th-place overall with no wins, and fourteenth Top 10 finishes while accumulating 878 points. This represents Bubba's second-best overall finish in the NASCAR Cup Series. On October 30, 23XI Racing announced that Bootie Barker, the 23 team's crew chief since 2021, would move to another position within the organization and that Charles Denike, who comes from the Truck Series, would be Wallace’s crew chief in 2025.

==== 2025: Winless streak snapped ====
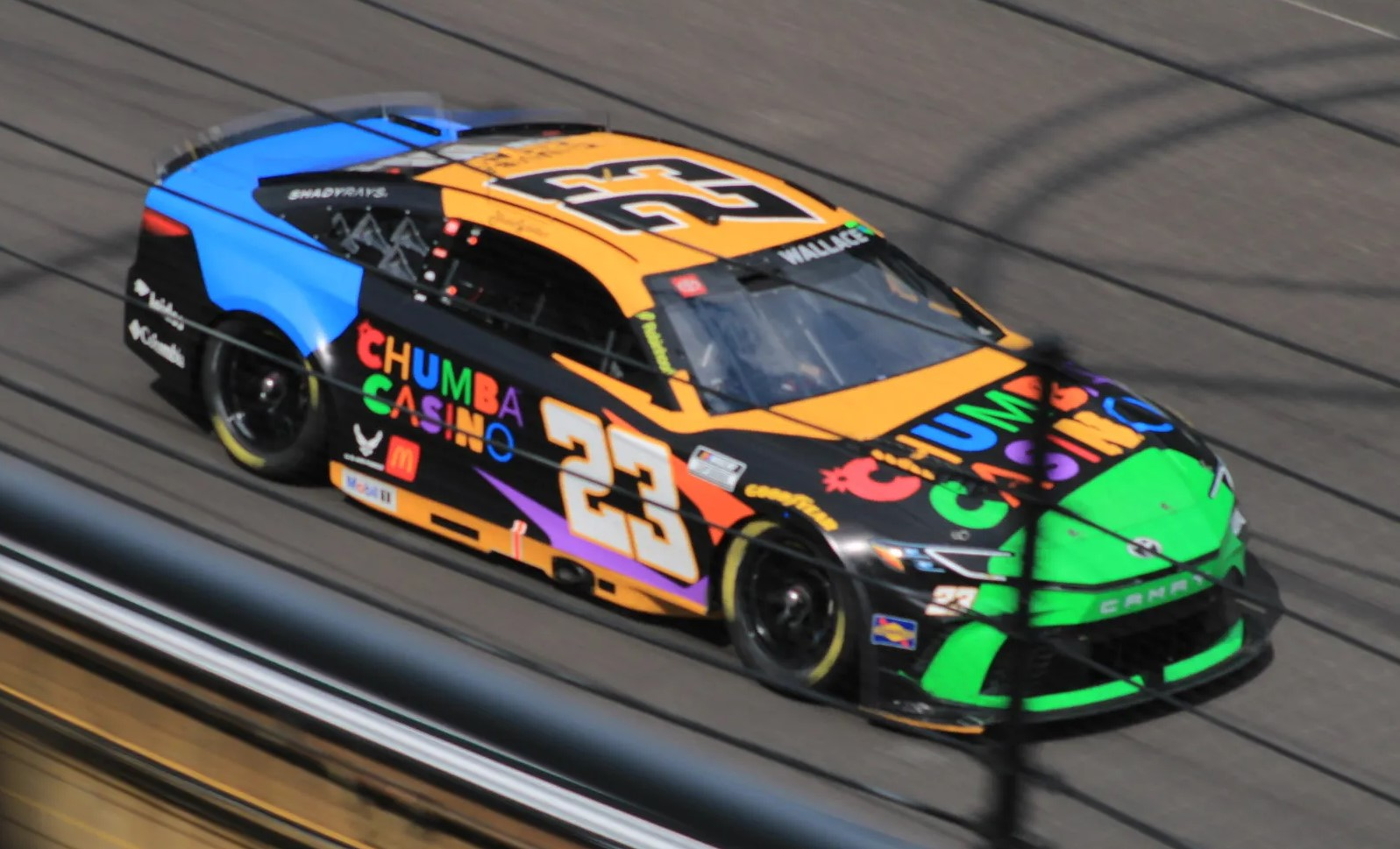
Wallace's race-winning No. 23 car at Indianapolis Motor Speedway in 2025.

Wallace began his 2025 season by winning Daytona Duel 1. However, Wallace ended up with a 29th-place DNF at Daytona. At Homestead, Wallace was in contention to win, but got passed by Alex Bowman late in the race. Staying consistent throughout the year, Wallace would earn his first win of the season at Indianapolis on July 27, after holding off Kyle Larson following a rain delay and double overtime finish. This win, in the Brickyard 400, meant he was the first black driver to win any major race on the Indianapolis Motor Speedway oval.

==== 2026: Third playoff appearance, late season struggles, winless season ====
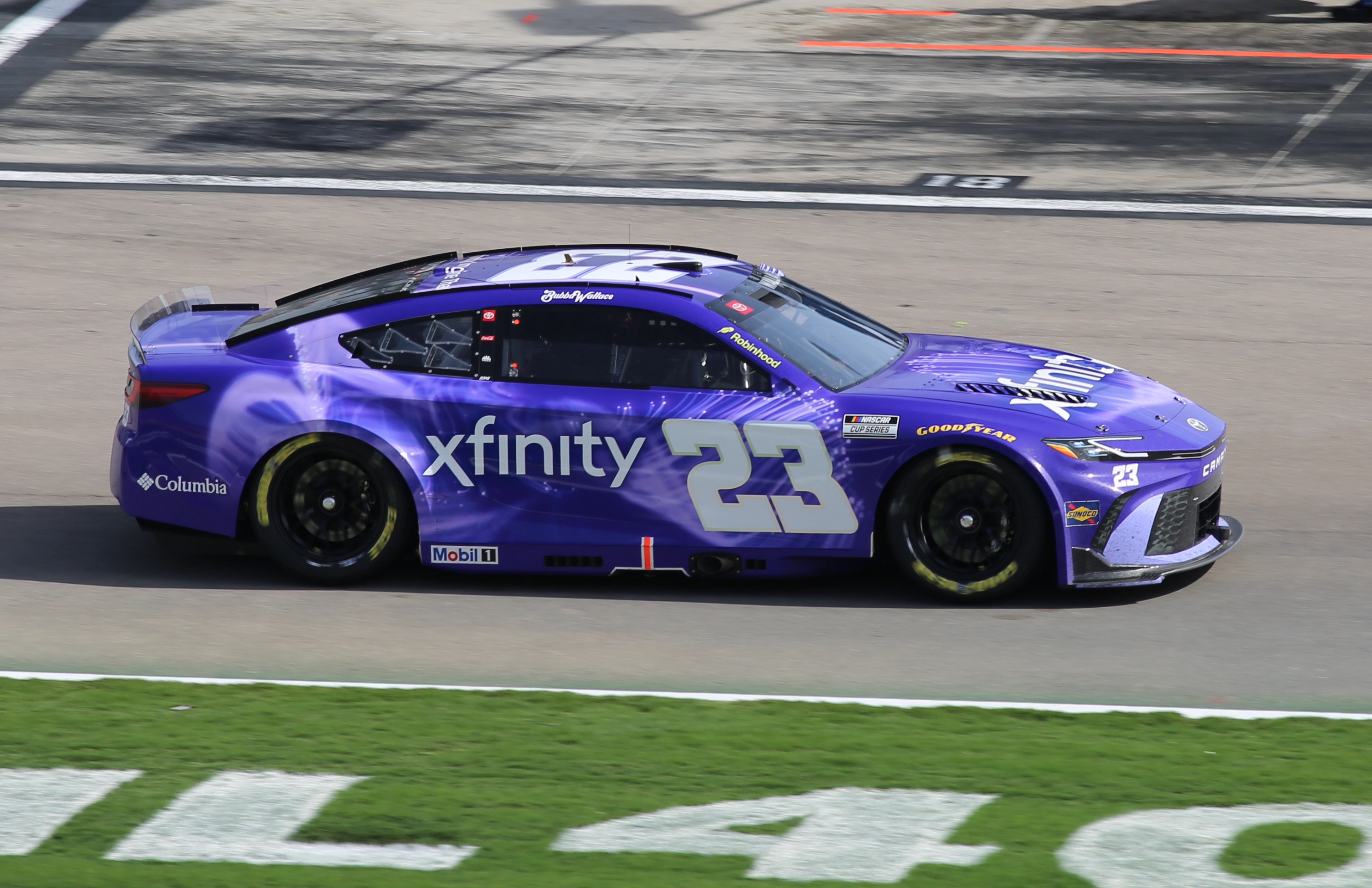
Wallace's No. 23 car at Las Vegas Motor Speedway in 2026

Wallace started the 2026 season with a 10th-place finish in the Daytona 500. The next week at Atlanta I, he finished eighth. During the summer stretch, at Coronado, he would rebound to a second-place finish after falling two laps down because of a loose wheel earlier in the race. He finished sixth at Chicagoland and North Wilkesboro. At the Atlanta Summer race, Wallace was running second on the final lap on the backstretch; however, he was issued a penalty for passing below the yellow line, resulting in a 29th-place finish. Despite experiencing a strong early season, Wallace went winless during the 2026 NASCAR Cup Series season. Driving the No. 23 Toyota for 23XI Racing, his season was defined by notable speed and high consistency contrasted by execution errors and late-race misfortunes. He finished the season 11th overall, matching his 2025 season finish.

== Noose investigation ==
On June 21, 2020, a member of Wallace's team reported to NASCAR that a noose had been placed in Wallace's garage stall at Talladega Superspeedway, which NASCAR president Steve Phelps relayed to Wallace in the evening. The organization condemned the act as "heinous" and said they would consult with law enforcement. Wallace stated that he was "incredibly saddened" by the "painful reminder of how much further we have to go as a society and how persistent we must be in the fight against racism," but also praised his fellow drivers who are "driving real change and championing a community that is accepting and welcoming of everyone." Before the GEICO 500 race the next day, the drivers and crews pushed Wallace's car to the front of pit road in a show of solidarity, a gesture that drivers Jimmie Johnson and Kevin Harvick proposed.

A day after the race, an investigation by the FBI concluded that Wallace was not the victim of a hate crime: the alleged noose was a pull-down rope with a loop, in the style of a hangman's knot, that was located on an overhead door, and had been in the garage since the fall Talladega race in 2019. The FBI's determination led to people criticizing Wallace on social media as fake and questioning his integrity. Wallace stated in interviews that although he was relieved that he was not specifically targeted, he was frustrated by the backlash he received. He nonetheless vowed not to let the incident or the subsequent "hoax" allegations "break" him. He added that regardless of "whether [it was] tied in 2019" or "wasn't directed at me... somebody tied a noose."

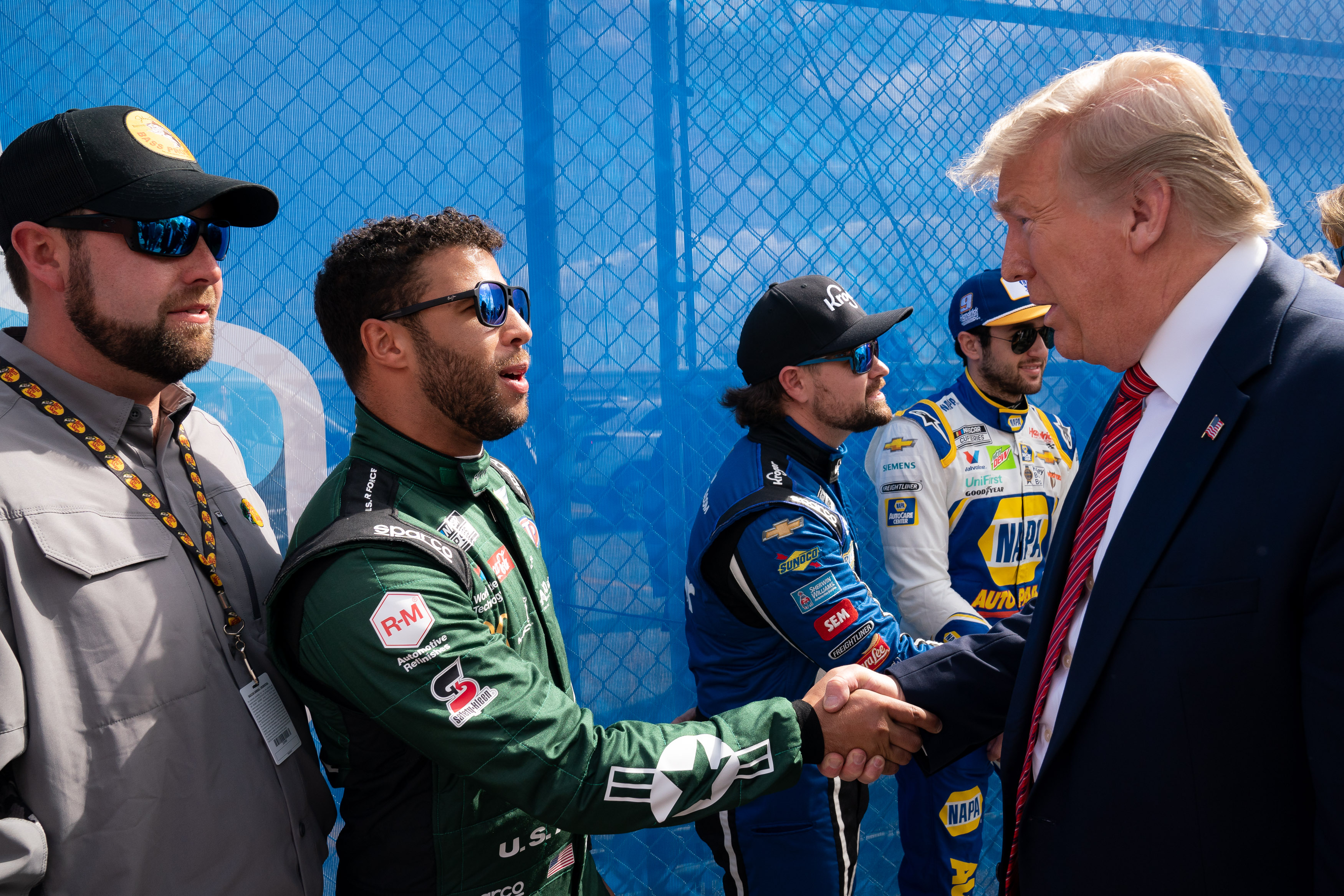
Wallace with U.S. President Donald Trump at the 2020 Daytona 500, who would later criticize Wallace in a tweet on July 6 of that year

On June 25, 2020, NASCAR released a photo of the noose taken by security. In a teleconference later that day, Phelps explained NASCAR had inspected every garage at the sanctioning body's 29 tracks, with 11 garages containing pull-down ropes tied in knots but only Wallace's being tied into a noose. Although the individual responsible was not identified, Phelps announced that NASCAR would require sensitivity and unconscious bias training for its personnel and that "Bubba Wallace and the 43 team had nothing to do with this."

Two weeks after the GEICO 500, on July 6, 2020, President Donald Trump tweeted that Wallace should apologize for the investigation, branding it a hoax while adding that it and NASCAR's Confederate flag ban "has caused lowest ratings EVER!" Trump's ratings claim was refuted by Fox Sports executive vice president Michael Mulvihill, who said the ratings had increased by eight percent since the 2020 season resumed in May, while Wallace received support from figures like Johnson, driver Tyler Reddick, and basketball player LeBron James.

== Activism ==
=== Philanthropy ===
Wallace founded and runs the Live to be Different Foundation. He was also the National Motorsports Press Association's Pocono Spirit Award winner for the second quarter of 2020, and the recipient of the Comcast Community Champion of the Year award for 2020.

=== Black Lives Matter ===
In May 2020, after the murder of George Floyd by Derek Chauvin in Minneapolis, Wallace began to speak out about the abuse of African Americans by the police, becoming the face of stock car racing's involvement in the Black Lives Matter movement. Wallace has advocated for causes such as police reform, defunding, & in some cases abolishment of Police forces. On June 8, 2020, he called on NASCAR to prohibit displays of the Confederate battle flag at NASCAR races. In 2015, after the publication of photographs showing the white man who killed nine black churchgoers in Charleston, South Carolina, posing with the flag, the organization began asking fans not to display the flag at its races. However, many fans in the South continued to hoist the Confederate flag at races. On June 10, 2020, NASCAR officially banned the display of the flag at its events.

In the 2020 Blue-Emu Maximum Pain Relief 500 NASCAR race at Martinsville Speedway, Wallace's car had a special paint scheme to honor Black Lives Matter when no other sponsor could be found for that race. The car featured an illustration of black and white hands interlocking together on the hood of the car, the hashtag #BlackLivesMatter on the side, and the phrase "Compassion, Love, Understanding" on both the hood and the back bumper. Richard Petty, owner of Richard Petty Motorsports, contributed to the livery by adding a peace symbol on the rear quarter-panel of the car that features hands of all colors circling inside the peace symbol. The livery was made after Richard Petty Motorsports failed to secure a primary sponsorship for the race. The team later suggested the idea to Wallace that he run an all-black car to honor the movement. Wallace finished 11th after securing top-ten finishes in both stages.

== Personal life ==
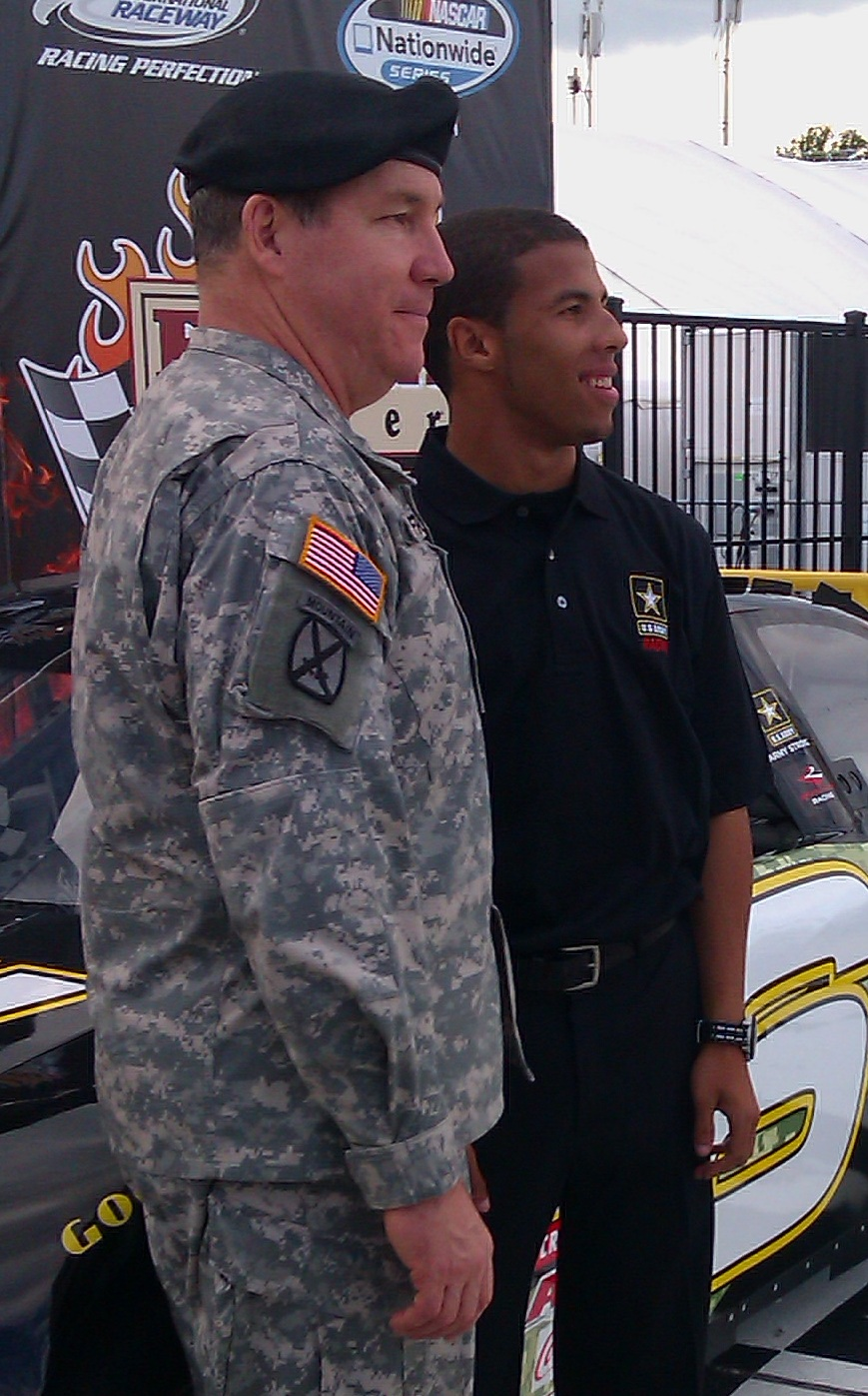
Wallace with a member of the U.S. Army, the sponsor of his East Series car in 2011, at Richmond.

Wallace was born in Mobile, Alabama and raised in Concord, North Carolina.

Born to a black mother and a white father, Wallace is the son of Darrell Wallace Sr. and Desiree Wallace. His father is the owner of an industrial cleaning company, and his mother is a social worker who ran track at the University of Tennessee.

Wallace is best friends with fellow NASCAR Cup Series driver Ryan Blaney. The two first met when they raced Bandoleros in their youth.

In 2019, Wallace revealed that he dealt with and continues to deal with depression for most of his racing career. After others reached out to him to thank him for bringing awareness to depression, Wallace said he did not know it was such a widespread problem; for him, being depressed was an honest answer to a media question.

On July 23, 2019, Wallace posted photos of Richard Petty autographing his left forearm. He vowed to have Petty's signature tattooed if the photos were retweeted 43,000 times. The goal was made by the morning of July 25. Less than a month later, Wallace had Petty's signature tattooed on the back of his right thigh.

Wallace married Amanda Carter on December 31, 2022, after getting engaged on July 30, 2021. The couple have a son and daughter together.

Wallace is a Christian. In an interview with Esquire in 2020, Wallace clarified that his criticism of Michael McDowell after an incident at that year's All-Star Race was not meant as an attack on McDowell's Christian faith as some had perceived. "A lot of people took that as attacking his faith and it definitely wasn't that. I have nothing against that. I'm a Christian myself. When you go disrespectful, then that shows the character that you are. That's what I was getting at." Wallace's wrecked front bumper from the incident was put up for auction and raised $20,034 for the Christian non-profit organization Motor Racing Outreach.

In 2026, American fast-food chain Hardee's released 'Bubba's Full Throttle Meal' for Hardee's rewards app members and online ordering.

=== In media ===
In 2017, Wallace voiced the character Bubba Wheelhouse in the 2017 Pixar film Cars 3.

Leading up to the 2018 Daytona 500, he starred in the Facebook Watch series Behind the Wall: Bubba Wallace.

Wallace and 23XI co-owner Denny Hamlin appear in the music video for Post Malone's 2021 song "Motley Crew".

In 2021, Wallace participated virtually in the 2021 Pro Bowl after the event was cancelled and hosted on Madden NFL 21.

In 2022, he was the subject of the Netflix docu-series Race: Bubba Wallace. The six-episode series follows Wallace's career during the 2020 and 2021 seasons, including his off-track life and activism.

In 2026, Wallace joined the NASCAR on The CW crew as a guest analyst at the 2026 Pennzoil 250.

== Motorsports career results ==
=== Stock car career summary ===
Season	Series	Team	Races	Wins	Top 5	Top 10	Points	Position
2010	NASCAR K&N Pro Series East	Rev Racing	10	2	5	7	1467	**3rd**
2011	NASCAR K&N Pro Series East	Rev Racing	12	3	5	11	1871	**2nd**
2012	NASCAR Nationwide Series	Joe Gibbs Racing	4	0	0	3	139	36th
2012	NASCAR K&N Pro Series East	Joe Gibbs Racing	14	1	6	7	470	7th
2013	NASCAR Camping World Truck Series	Kyle Busch Motorsports	22	1	5	12	704	8th
2013	ARCA Racing Series	Venturini Motorsports	1	0	0	0	55	137th
2014	NASCAR Nationwide Series	Joe Gibbs Racing	2	0	0	1	0	NC†
2014	NASCAR Camping World Truck Series	Kyle Busch Motorsports	22	4	9	14	799	**3rd**
2015	NASCAR Xfinity Series	Roush Fenway Racing	33	0	3	14	1071	7th
2016	NASCAR Xfinity Series	Roush Fenway Racing	33	0	3	9	2163	11th
2017	NASCAR Cup Series	Richard Petty Motorsports	4	0	0	0	0	NC†
2017	NASCAR Xfinity Series	Roush Fenway Racing	12	0	0	7	348	20th
2017	NASCAR Xfinity Series	Biagi–DenBeste Racing	1	0	0	1	348	20th
2017	NASCAR Camping World Truck Series	MDM Motorsports	1	1	1	1	0	NC†
2018	NASCAR Cup Series	Richard Petty Motorsports	36	0	1	3	471	28th
2018	NASCAR Camping World Truck Series	Young's Motorsports	1	0	0	0	0	NC†
2018	NASCAR K&N Pro Series East	Jefferson Pitts Racing	1	0	0	1	38	42nd
2019	NASCAR Cup Series	Richard Petty Motorsports	36	0	1	1	437	28th
2019	NASCAR Gander Outdoors Truck Series	AM Racing	2	0	0	1	0	NC†
2020	NASCAR Cup Series	Richard Petty Motorsports	36	0	1	5	597	22nd
2021	NASCAR Cup Series	23XI Racing	36	1	3	3	699	21st
2021	NASCAR Xfinity Series	Hattori Racing Enterprises	1	0	0	1	0	NC†
2021	NASCAR Camping World Truck Series	Spencer Davis Motorsports	1	0	0	0	0	NC†
2022	NASCAR Cup Series	23XI Racing	35	1	5	10	637	19th
2022	NASCAR Xfinity Series	Joe Gibbs Racing	2	0	0	0	0	NC†
2023	NASCAR Cup Series	23XI Racing	36	0	5	10	2279	10th
2023	NASCAR Craftsman Truck Series	Tricon Garage	2	0	1	2	0	NC†
2024	NASCAR Cup Series	23XI Racing	36	0	6	14	878	18th
2025	NASCAR Cup Series	23XI Racing	36	1	6	14	2256	11th

^{†} As Wallace was a guest driver, he was ineligible for championship points.

=== NASCAR ===
(key) (Bold – Pole position awarded by qualifying time. Italics – Pole position earned by points standings or practice time. * – Most laps led.)

==== Cup Series ====
NASCAR Cup Series results
Year	Team	No.	Make	1	2	3	4	5	6	7	8	9	10	11	12	13	14	15	16	17	18	19	20	21	22	23	24	25	26	27	28	29	30	31	32	33	34	35	36	NCSC	Pts	Ref
2017	Richard Petty Motorsports	43	Ford	DAY	ATL	LVS	PHO	CAL	MAR	TEX	BRI	RCH	TAL	KAN	CLT	DOV	POC; 26	MCH; 19	SON	DAY; 15	KEN; 11	NHA	IND	POC	GLN	MCH	BRI	DAR	RCH	CHI	NHA	DOV	CLT	TAL	KAN	MAR	TEX	PHO	HOM	50th	0^{1}	
2018	Richard Petty Motorsports	43	Chevy	DAY; 2	ATL; 32	LVS; 21	PHO; 28	CAL; 20	MAR; 34	TEX; 8	BRI; 16	RCH; 25	TAL; 16	DOV; 25	KAN; 23	CLT; 16	POC; 38	MCH; 19	SON; 29	CHI; 23	DAY; 14	KEN; 27	NHA; 24	POC; 33	GLN; 25	MCH; 23	BRI; 38	DAR; 26	IND; 38	LVS; 38	RCH; 27	ROV; 36	DOV; 23	TAL; 19	KAN; 26	MAR; 34	TEX; 25	PHO; 10	HOM; 21	28th	471	
2019	Richard Petty Motorsports	43	Chevy	DAY; 38	ATL; 27	LVS; 26	PHO; 22	CAL; 30	MAR; 17	TEX; 23	BRI; 20	RCH; 27	TAL; 39	DOV; 27	KAN; 29	CLT; 25	POC; 21	MCH; 28	SON; 26	CHI; 25	DAY; 15	KEN; 23	NHA; 22	POC; 22	GLN; 28	MCH; 27	BRI; 14	DAR; 24	IND; 3	LVS; 23	RCH; 12	ROV; 24	DOV; 20	TAL; 24	KAN; 35	MAR; 13	TEX; 24	PHO; 25	HOM; 34	28th	437	
2020	Richard Petty Motorsports	43	Chevy	DAY; 15	LVS; 6	CAL; 27	PHO; 19	DAR; 21	DAR; 16	CLT; 38	CLT; 37	BRI; 10	ATL; 21	MAR; 11	HOM; 13	TAL; 14	POC; 22	POC; 20	IND; 9	KEN; 27	TEX; 14	KAN; 37	NHA; 23	MCH; 9	MCH; 21	DRC; 25	DOV; 27	DOV; 21	DAY; 5	DAR; 38	RCH; 26	BRI; 22	LVS; 28	TAL; 24	ROV; 21	KAN; 18	TEX; 38	MAR; 21	PHO; 15	22nd	597	
2021	23XI Racing	23	Toyota	DAY; 17	DRC; 26	HOM; 22	LVS; 28	PHO; 16	ATL; 16	BRD; 27	MAR; 16	RCH; 26	TAL; 19	KAN; 26	DAR; 21	DOV; 11	COA; 39	CLT; 14	SON; 14	NSH; 20	POC; 14	POC; 5	ROA; 24	ATL; 14	NHA; 26	GLN; 23	IRC; 13	MCH; 19	DAY; 2	DAR; 21	RCH; 32	BRI; 16	LVS; 16	TAL; 1	ROV; 14	TEX; 32	KAN; 14	MAR; 25	PHO; 39	21st	699	
2022	23XI Racing	23	Toyota	DAY; 2	CAL; 19	LVS; 25	PHO; 22	ATL; 13	COA; 38	RCH; 26	MAR; 16	BRD; 28	TAL; 17	DOV; 16	DAR; 27	KAN; 10	CLT; 28	GTW; 26	SON; 36	NSH; 12	ROA; 35	ATL; 14	NHA; 3	POC; 8	IRC; 5	**MCH**; 2	RCH; 13	GLN; 35	DAY; 11											19th	637	
2022	23XI Racing	45	Toyota																											DAR; 9	KAN; 1	BRI; 29	TEX; 25	TAL; 16	ROV; 7	LVS; 36	HOM	MAR; 8	PHO; 22	19th	637	
2023	23XI Racing	23	Toyota	DAY; 20	CAL; 30	LVS; 4	PHO; 14	ATL; 27	COA; 37	RCH; 22	BRD; 12	MAR; 9	TAL; 28	DOV; 12	KAN; 4	DAR; 5	CLT; 4	GTW; 30	SON; 17	NSH; 15	CSC; 31	ATL; 25	NHA; 8	POC; 11	RCH; 12	MCH; 18	IRC; 18	GLN; 12	DAY; 12	DAR; 7	KAN; 32	BRI; 14	**TEX**; 3*	TAL; 23	ROV; 16	LVS; 13	HOM; 6	MAR; 11	PHO; 10	10th	2279	
2024	23XI Racing	23	Toyota	DAY; 5	ATL; 5	LVS; 35	PHO; 16	BRI; 29	COA; 15	RCH; 13	MAR; 4	TEX; 7	TAL; 36	DOV; 32	KAN; 17	DAR; 7	CLT; 11	GTW; 21	SON; 20	IOW; 17	NHA; 34	NSH; 7	CSC; 13	POC; 10	IND; 5	RCH; 4	MCH; 26	DAY; 6	**DAR**; 16	ATL; 29	GLN; 17	BRI; 3	KAN; 17	TAL; 9	ROV; 9	LVS; 12	HOM; 18	MAR; 18	PHO; 7	18th	878	
2025	23XI Racing	23	Toyota	DAY; 29	ATL; 9	COA; 20	PHO; 29	LVS; 28	HOM; 3	MAR; 3	DAR; 21	BRI; 19	TAL; 8	TEX; 33	KAN; 33	CLT; 35	NSH; 6	MCH; 4	MXC; 12	POC; 36	ATL; 22	CSC; 28	SON; 26	DOV; 7	IND; 1	IOW; 6	GLN; 8	RCH; 28*	DAY; 37	DAR; 6	GTW; 8	BRI; 34	NHA; 26	KAN; 5	ROV; 15	LVS; 22	TAL; 4	MAR; 18	PHO; 37	11th	2256	
2026	23XI Racing	23	Toyota	DAY; 10*	ATL; 8	COA; 11	PHO; 6	LVS; 9	DAR; 34	MAR; 36	BRI; 11	KAN; 5	TAL; 36	TEX; 9	GLN; 29	CLT; 22	NSH; 32	MCH; 3	POC; 21	COR; 2	SON; 22	CHI; 6	ATL; 29	NWS; 6	IND; 28	IOW; 12	RCH; 20	NHA; 2	DAY; 20	DAR; 8	GTW; 14	BRI; 7	KAN; 9	LVS; 8	CLT; 37	PHO; 17	TAL; 22	MAR; 8	HOM; 5	11th	2293	

===== Daytona 500 =====
Year	Team	Manufacturer	Start	Finish
2018	Richard Petty Motorsports	Chevrolet	7	2
2019	Richard Petty Motorsports	Chevrolet	13	38
2020	Richard Petty Motorsports	Chevrolet	11	15
2021	23XI Racing	Toyota	6	17
2022	23XI Racing	Toyota	16	2
2023	23XI Racing	Toyota	15	20
2024	23XI Racing	Toyota	24	5
2025	23XI Racing	Toyota	3	29
2026	23XI Racing	Toyota	27	10*

==== Xfinity Series ====
NASCAR Xfinity Series results
Year	Team	No.	Make	1	2	3	4	5	6	7	8	9	10	11	12	13	14	15	16	17	18	19	20	21	22	23	24	25	26	27	28	29	30	31	32	33	NXSC	Pts	Ref
2012	Joe Gibbs Racing	20	Toyota	DAY	PHO	LVS	BRI	CAL	TEX	RCH	TAL	DAR	IOW; 9	CLT	DOV	MCH	ROA	KEN	DAY	NHA	CHI	IND	IOW; 7	GLN	CGV	BRI	ATL	RCH; 10	CHI	KEN	**DOV**; 12	CLT	KAN	TEX	PHO	HOM	36th	139	
2014	Joe Gibbs Racing	20	Toyota	DAY	PHO	LVS	BRI	CAL	TEX	DAR	RCH	TAL; 31	IOW	CLT	DOV	MCH	ROA	KEN	DAY; 7	NHA	CHI	IND	IOW	GLN	MOH	BRI	ATL	RCH	CHI	KEN	DOV	KAN	CLT	TEX	PHO	HOM	94th	0^{1}	
2015	Roush Fenway Racing	6	Ford	DAY; 12	ATL; 11	LVS; 7	PHO; 15	CAL; 12	TEX; 6	BRI; 12	RCH; 12	TAL; 20	IOW; 6	CLT; 5	**DOV**; 17	MCH; 15	CHI; 10	DAY; 34	KEN; 7	NHA; 8	IND; 23	IOW; 11	GLN; 16	MOH; 8	BRI; 12	ROA; 5	DAR; 14	RCH; 14	CHI; 3	KEN; 9	DOV; 11	CLT; 8	KAN; 11	TEX; 19	PHO; 8	HOM; 10	7th	1071	
2016	Roush Fenway Racing	6	Ford	DAY; 6	ATL; 18	LVS; 33	PHO; 12	CAL; 3	TEX; 15	BRI; 25	RCH; 16	TAL; 13	DOV; 2	CLT; 27	POC; 16	MCH; 9	IOW; 9	DAY; 20	KEN; 5	NHA; 12	IND; 14	IOW; 27	GLN; 29	MOH; 15	BRI; 7	ROA; 9	DAR; 17	RCH; 12	CHI; 20	KEN; 8	DOV; 11	CLT; 20	KAN; 33	TEX; 11	PHO; 32	HOM; 11	11th	2163	
2017	Roush Fenway Racing	6	Ford	DAY; 33	ATL; 6	LVS; 6	PHO; 6	CAL; 6	TEX; 6	BRI; 33	RCH; 6	TAL; 13	CLT; 28	DOV; 8	POC; 11	MCH	IOW	DAY	KEN	NHA	IND	IOW	GLN	MOH	BRI	ROA	DAR	RCH									20th	348	
2017	Biagi–DenBeste Racing	98	Ford																										CHI; 10	KEN	DOV	CLT	KAN	TEX	PHO	HOM	20th	348	
2021	Hattori Racing Enterprises	61	Toyota	DAY	DRC	HOM	LVS	PHO	ATL	MAR	TAL	DAR	DOV	COA	CLT	MOH	TEX	NSH	POC	ROA	ATL	NHA	GLN	IRC	MCH; 10	DAY	DAR	RCH	BRI	LVS	TAL	ROV	TEX	KAN	MAR	PHO	87th	0^{1}	
2022	Joe Gibbs Racing	18	Toyota	DAY	CAL	LVS	PHO	ATL	COA; 28	RCH	MAR	TAL	DOV	DAR	TEX	CLT	PIR	NSH	ROA	ATL	NHA	POC	IRC; 35	MCH	GLN	DAY	DAR	KAN	BRI	TEX	TAL	ROV	LVS	HOM	MAR	PHO	105th	0^{1}	

==== Craftsman Truck Series ====
NASCAR Craftsman Truck Series results
Year	Team	No.	Make	1	2	3	4	5	6	7	8	9	10	11	12	13	14	15	16	17	18	19	20	21	22	23	NCTC	Pts	Ref
2013	Kyle Busch Motorsports	54	Toyota	DAY; 12	MAR; 5	CAR; 27	KAN; 7	CLT; 27	**DOV**; 10	TEX; 6	KEN; 28	IOW; 8	ELD; 7	POC; 7	MCH; 21	BRI; 28	MSP; 4	IOW; 5	CHI; 11	LVS; 5	TAL; 17	MAR; 1*	TEX; 7	PHO; 20	HOM; 15		8th	704	
2014	Kyle Busch Motorsports	54	Toyota	DAY; 26	MAR; 2	KAN; 15	CLT; 26	DOV; 16	TEX; 10	GTW; 1*	KEN; 2	**IOW**; 13	ELD; 1*	POC; 8	MCH; 11*	BRI; 2	MSP; 12	CHI; 6	NHA; 2	LVS; 2*	TAL; 9		TEX; 26	PHO; 6	HOM; 1		3rd	799	
2014	Kyle Busch Motorsports	34	Toyota																			**MAR**; 1*					3rd	799	
2017	MDM Motorsports	99	Chevy	DAY	ATL	MAR	KAN	CLT	DOV	TEX	GTW	IOW	KEN	ELD	POC	MCH; 1	BRI	MSP	CHI	NHA	LVS	TAL	MAR	TEX	PHO	HOM	103rd	0^{1}	
2018	Young's Motorsports	20	Chevy	DAY	ATL	LVS	MAR	DOV	KAN; 14	CLT	TEX	IOW	GTW	CHI	KEN	ELD	POC	MCH	BRI	MSP	LVS	TAL	MAR	TEX	PHO	HOM	101st	0^{1}	
2019	AM Racing	22	Chevy	DAY	ATL	LVS	MAR; 10	TEX; 20	DOV	KAN	CLT	TEX	IOW	GTW	CHI	KEN	POC	ELD	MCH	BRI	MSP	LVS	TAL	MAR	PHO	HOM	102nd	0^{1}	
2021	Spencer Davis Motorsports	11	Toyota	DAY	DRC	LVS	ATL	BRD; 11	RCH	KAN	DAR	COA	CLT	TEX	NSH	POC	KNX	GLN	GTW	DAR	BRI	LVS	TAL	MAR	PHO		103rd	0^{1}	
2022	Halmar Friesen Racing	52	Toyota	DAY	LVS	ATL	COA	MAR	BRD	DAR	KAN; QL^{†}	TEX	CLT	GTW	SON	KNX	NSH	MOH	POC	IRP	RCH	KAN	BRI	TAL	HOM	PHO	N/A	—	
2023	Tricon Garage	1	Toyota	DAY	LVS	ATL	COA	TEX	BRD	MAR	KAN	DAR; 7	NWS; 5	CLT	GTW	NSH	MOH	POC	RCH	IRP	MLW	KAN	BRI	TAL	HOM	PHO	94th	0^{1}	
^{†} – Practiced and qualified for Stewart Friesen

^{*} Season still in progress
^{1} Ineligible for series points

=== ARCA Racing Series ===
(key) (Bold – Pole position awarded by qualifying time. Italics – Pole position earned by points standings or practice time. * – Most laps led.)

ARCA Racing Series results
Year	Team	No.	Make	1	2	3	4	5	6	7	8	9	10	11	12	13	14	15	16	17	18	19	20	21	ARSC	Pts	Ref
2013	Venturini Motorsports	55	Toyota	DAY; 35	MOB	SLM	TAL	TOL	ELK	POC	MCH	ROA	WIN	CHI	NJE	POC	BLN	ISF	MAD	DSF	IOW	SLM	KEN	KAN	137th	55	

==== K&N Pro Series East ====
NASCAR K&N Pro Series East results
Year	Team	No.	Make	1	2	3	4	5	6	7	8	9	10	11	12	13	14	NKNPSEC	Pts	Ref
2010	Rev Racing	6	Chevy	GRE; 1	SBO; 20		MAR; 3	NHA; 3	LRP; 6	LEE; 1	JFC; 15	NHA; 9	DOV; 25					3rd	1467	
2010	Rev Racing	76	Chevy			IOW; 3												3rd	1467	
2011	Rev Racing	6	Toyota	GRE; 6	**SBO**; 6*	RCH; 1	IOW; 6	BGS; 6	JFC; 4	LGY; 9	NHA; 30	COL; 1*	GRE; 6	**NHA**; 3	**DOV**; 1			2nd	1871	
2012	Joe Gibbs Racing	18	Toyota	BRI; 18	**GRE**; 1*	RCH; 28	IOW; 26	BGS; 2	JFC; 7	LGY; 16	CNB; 22	COL; 3	IOW; 11	NHA; 3	**DOV**; 2*	GRE; 13	CAR; 3	7th	470	
2018	Jefferson Pitts Racing	27	Chevy	NSM	BRI	LGY	SBO	SBO	MEM	NJM	TMP	NHA	IOW	GLN; 6	GTW	NHA	DOV	42nd	38	

=== CARS Super Late Model Tour ===
(key)

CARS Super Late Model Tour results
Year	Team	No.	Make	1	2	3	4	5	6	7	8	9	10	11	12	13	CSLMTC	Pts	Ref
2017	Jamie Yelton	6W	Ford	CON	DOM	DOM	HCY	HCY	BRI; 1*	AND	ROU	TCM	ROU	HCY	CON	SBO	N/A	0	

Sporting positions
Preceded by Kyle Larson	Brickyard 400 winner 2025	Succeeded by Incumbent
Preceded by Inaugural	U.S. Short Track Nationals Winner; 2017	Succeeded by Raphaël Lessard
Awards
Preceded by Ryan Truex	NASCAR K&N Pro Series East Rookie of the Year; 2010	Succeeded by Alex Bowman
Preceded by Matt DiBenedetto	UARA-Stars Late Model Series Rookie of the Year; 2008	Succeeded by Brennan Poole
