= NASCAR Driver Development Program =

Development system run by NASCAR

The NASCAR Driver Development Program (formerly known as Drive for Diversity / D4D) program is a development system instituted by the American auto racing league NASCAR. The program's purpose is to attract minority and female individuals to the sport, primarily as drivers, but also including ownership, sponsorship, and crew member roles, and to attract a more diverse audience to the sport. Before an applicant is accepted into the program, their resumes are checked by NASCAR officials. The system is similar to a driver development program where applicants progress through minor-league and regional racing levels to prepare them for a possible shot at one of NASCAR's three national series. The program was started during the 2004 season by NASCAR marketing executives in order to attract female and minority fans and drivers to the historically white and male-dominated sport. The year before, Joe Gibbs Racing, along with former athletes Reggie White and Magic Johnson, had started a similar program.

NASCAR changed the name of the program to the "Driver Development Program" in 2025.

== History and structure ==
=== Context ===
Several factors have been attributed to the absence of minorities in stock car racing. One is the costs of auto racing and dependency on sponsorship dollars, with many minority individuals and families lacking the capital to enter the inherently expensive racing world. Others believe that minority youths are more drawn to conventional "stick-and-ball" sports such as basketball. A key factor is the overt racism in the country that had plagued other sports as well, but was particularly strong in American stock car racing due to its roots in the South. This included the presence of Confederate flags in the infields of many tracks at both the regional and national levels. For these reasons, NASCAR has been slower to racially integrate than other major sports in the country. In spite of the lack of minorities and women in the sport, some claim that on paper NASCAR provides a more-balanced playing field than other sports.

The first and most notable African American driver in the sport is Wendell Scott, a former bootlegger who broke the color barrier in the 1950s and raced competitively in inferior equipment and with sub-par support, while contending with discrimination and threats from fans and other drivers. Scott's only win at the Cup Series level came at Jacksonville Speedway Park in 1963. The win and the trophy was initially given to Buck Baker, and Scott did not receive official recognition until a month later, when he was given a small wooden trophy with no nameplate. Only seven black drivers have ever competed at NASCAR's top level, most notably Scott, Bubba Wallace, and Willy T. Ribbs.

In 2019, Driver Lacy Kuehl, age 12, was the youngest ever signed youth development driver. NASCAR gave Kuehl the Young racer award at NASCAR's Hall of Fame in Charlotte. Kuehl raced in the 2019 Summer Bojangles Shootout and 5 other races, including Atlanta Speedway. Female drivers have been equally scarce within auto racing. Although there was a time when women were banned from entering the pit area during races, there has been no official legislation preventing women from participating during most of NASCAR's history. Sara Christian drove in the inaugural Cup Series (then Strictly Stock) race at Charlotte Speedway in 1949, and is the only woman in Cup Series history to score a top five finish. The most notable woman in the sport was Janet Guthrie, the first woman to compete in both the Daytona 500 and Indianapolis 500. Guthrie scored five top tens over 33 career starts in NASCAR's top three series. Another notable driver was Louise Smith, known as "the first lady of racing". Smith made 11 starts in what is now the Cup Series, and was used to promote the sport in the 1940s by NASCAR founder Bill France Sr. A total of 15 women have made starts in the Cup Series.

=== Origins ===
In 1999, manufacturer Dodge began a diversity program, selecting Mexican driver Carlos Contreras to drive a Dodge Ram for Petty Enterprises in the Craftsman Truck Series. In December 2000, Dodge announced that veteran African American driver Willy T. Ribbs would drive in the Truck Series for the full 2001 season in a factory-backed effort for Bobby Hamilton Racing. Ribbs, who had made starts in the Cup Series, Indy Car and Champ Car, was part of the continued diversity effort by Dodge (reentering Cup competition for 2001), selected from a test program that included Bill Lester and Tim Woods. Ribbs ran 23 out of 24 races in the 8 Dodge Motorsports Ram truck (DNQing at Martinsville), finishing 16th in points but with no top 10 finishes. Lester ran 5 races in BHR's 4 truck with a best finish of 18th, then replaced Ribbs in the 8 truck for the 2002 and 2003 seasons, scoring a pole at Charlotte in 2003 and finishing 17th and 14th in points in the two seasons respectively. He would leave BHR after 2003 due to lack of sponsorship. Female driver Deborah Renshaw moved into BHR's 8 truck in 2005, finishing 24th in points. Erin Crocker also ran two races for BHR in 2005, before moving on to Evernham Motorsports in 2006 and 2007.

In 2003, Joe Gibbs Racing partnered with former NFL player Reggie White to start a team that would assist minority drivers in rising up the ranks of the Motorsports world. In 2004, the team came into form with assistance of Gibbs' Cup and Busch Series sponsors Home Depot, MBNA, and Rockwell Automation. The original two drivers were Aric Almirola (a future winner at the Cup level) and Chris Bristol (who would join NASCAR's D4D program in 2006), who drove cars numbered 20 and 18 respectively at two different short tracks in the NASCAR Weekly Racing Series. Almirola and Bristol returned in 2005, with both drivers running number 92 to honor the late Reggie White.

=== NASCAR involvement ===
The NASCAR-based program was conceived in the 1990s, officially implemented in 2004 by NASCAR chairman Brian France, and based largely off input from White and NBA star Brad Daugherty. D4D was one of several programs instigated to increase viewership and audience diversity as well as provide income for the sport, along with the Chase for the NEXTEL Cup and series in Canada and Mexico. NASCAR hired Access Marketing & Communications, a company started with money from NASCAR given to the Rainbow/PUSH initiative of Rev. Jesse Jackson, to find drivers, conduct a testing combine, and set the drivers up with owners who would receive stipends to fund competitive rides at short tracks in the Dodge Weekly Racing Series. The first Drive for Diversity combine, featuring 12 drivers and 28 pit crew members, was held in January 2004 at Hickory Motor Speedway in North Carolina, with five drivers and six crew members selected. After two seasons, several reports surfaced of teams not receiving adequate funds, while other teams owners did not supplement the NASCAR investment with additional funds, leading to limited results on the track. Another shortcoming of the early D4D classes was the age of the participants, as many of the drivers (such as Morty Buckles and Reggie Primus) were over the age of 30 and past their prime. Due to the lackluster performance, NASCAR cut ties with Access Marketing after 2008 and proceeded to hire Max Siegel (music executive and former president of Dale Earnhardt, Inc.) to revamp the program.

In its current state, the program accepts around 6–10 drivers. 20 or so prospective drivers between the ages of 14 and 26 are invited to a testing combine, in which NASCAR evaluates each driver's résumé, on-track lap-times, driving knowledge, physical fitness, communications skills, and media aptitude. Siegel meanwhile started the Rev Racing team in 2009 to train the selected drivers in an academy-like setting, with drivers being fielded in the Weekly Series (now the Whelen All-American Series) or the touring K&N Pro Series East and West. In addition to investing $3 million in the program, Siegel himself is also responsible for finding sponsorship for the drivers. Since the inception of the current program, Rev Racing has been fielding competitive rides with funding from companies such as Toyota, Nike, Inc., and Sunoco and have had several drivers move on to the national series.

The Drive for Diversity also includes a pit crew development program to identify and develop minority and female pit crew members. Like Cup Series teams, the program seeks out former competitive athletes (high school and college), then puts them through a combine which includes conventional drills and racing-specific drills. According to Siegel, the pit crew program has a 100 percent placement rate throughout NASCAR.

=== Controversies ===
In November 2023, America First Legal, an organization founded and led by Stephen Miller, a former Senior Advisor to President Donald Trump (and future Homeland Security Advisor and White House Deputy Chief of Staff for Policy in Trump's second term), filed a petition to the United States Equal Employment Opportunity Commission to investigate NASCAR and Rev Racing for the program leading to "illegal discrimination against white, male Americans." in violation of the Title VII of the Civil Rights Act of 1964.

== Impact on NASCAR ==
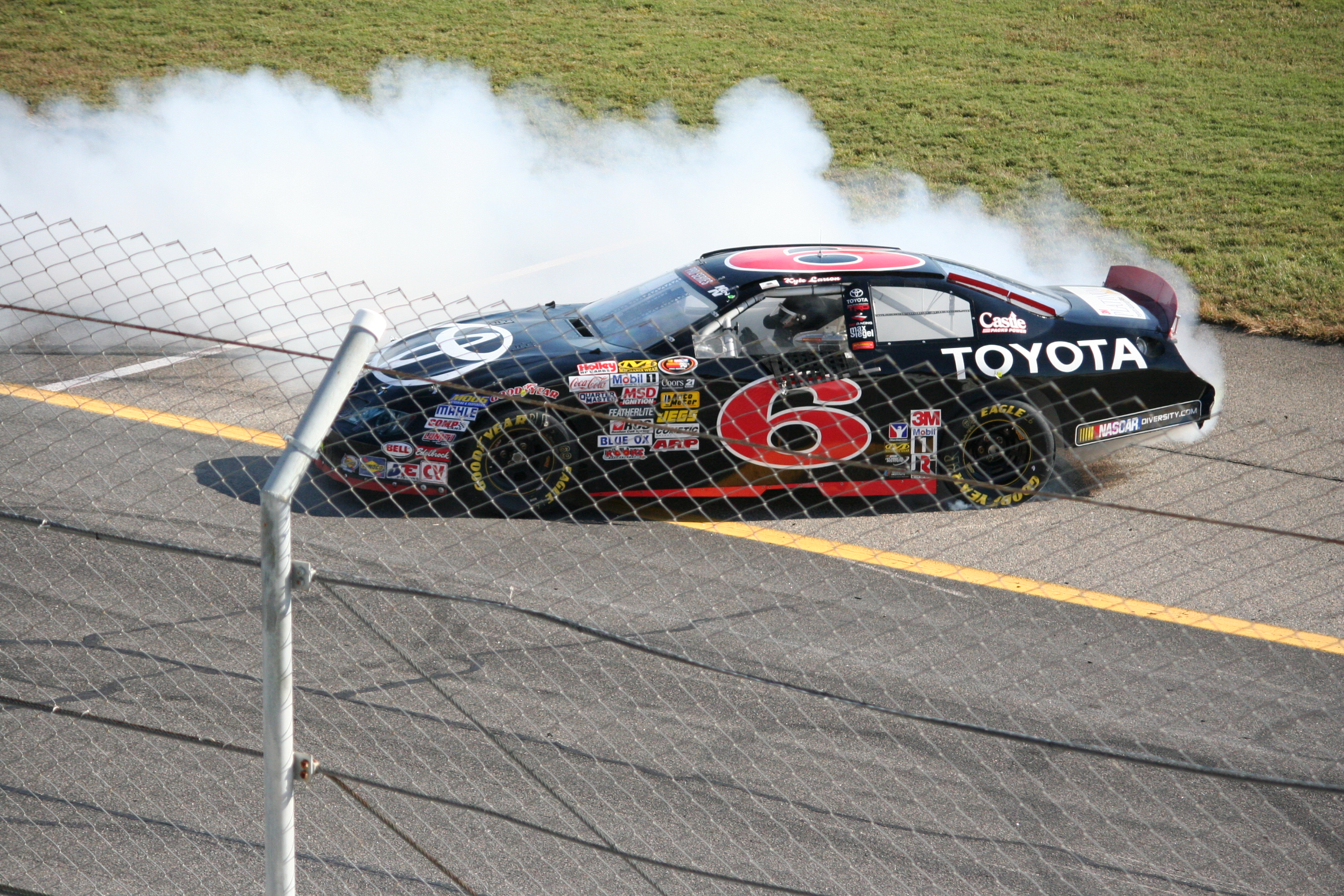
Kyle Larson winning at Rockingham Speedway in 2012.

The overall impact of the D4D program and NASCAR's diversification efforts have been minimal, as the drivers from the program (in spite of their success at the regional level) are often starved of opportunities and sponsorship dollars once they graduate from the program. ESPN analyst, team owner, and former NBA all-star Brad Daugherty acknowledges some progress, claiming the sport is "more inviting than it was [in the past]." But he also believes "owners are a little scared...Corporate America just isn't ready to take a lot of chances with their dollars on a non-known entity." Several drivers had left the program early in its history, citing issues with the equipment and resources provided to them. Some state that the absence of funding is systematic across the sport, with many young drivers' careers being stalled out before they make it to a higher level or a more competitive ride.

Into the 2010s, the diversity program's impact appears to be increasing, with one of the biggest problems being the continued perception of NASCAR as an all-white and non-inclusive institution. Max Siegel stated that "the biggest barrier in diversifying audience is the perception," with D4D driver Dylan Smith noting that "people associate NASCAR so much with racism." NASCAR spokesperson Marcus Jadotte believes that the NASCAR fan base will broaden as more minorities and women move up through the sport's ranks.

Some drivers, such as former Hendrick Motorsports and Rusty Wallace Racing development driver Chase Austin, have refused to join the D4D due to the possible stigma of affirmative action.

Any impact still pales in comparison to other auto racing series, with the mixed Lewis Hamilton winning seven Formula One world championships since 2008, Antron Brown winning the 2012 NHRA Top Fuel championship, sisters Ashley, Courtney and Brittany Force running competitively in the NHRA's Funny Car and Top Fuel divisions, and several female drivers competing simultaneously at IndyCar's top level.

=== Graduates ===
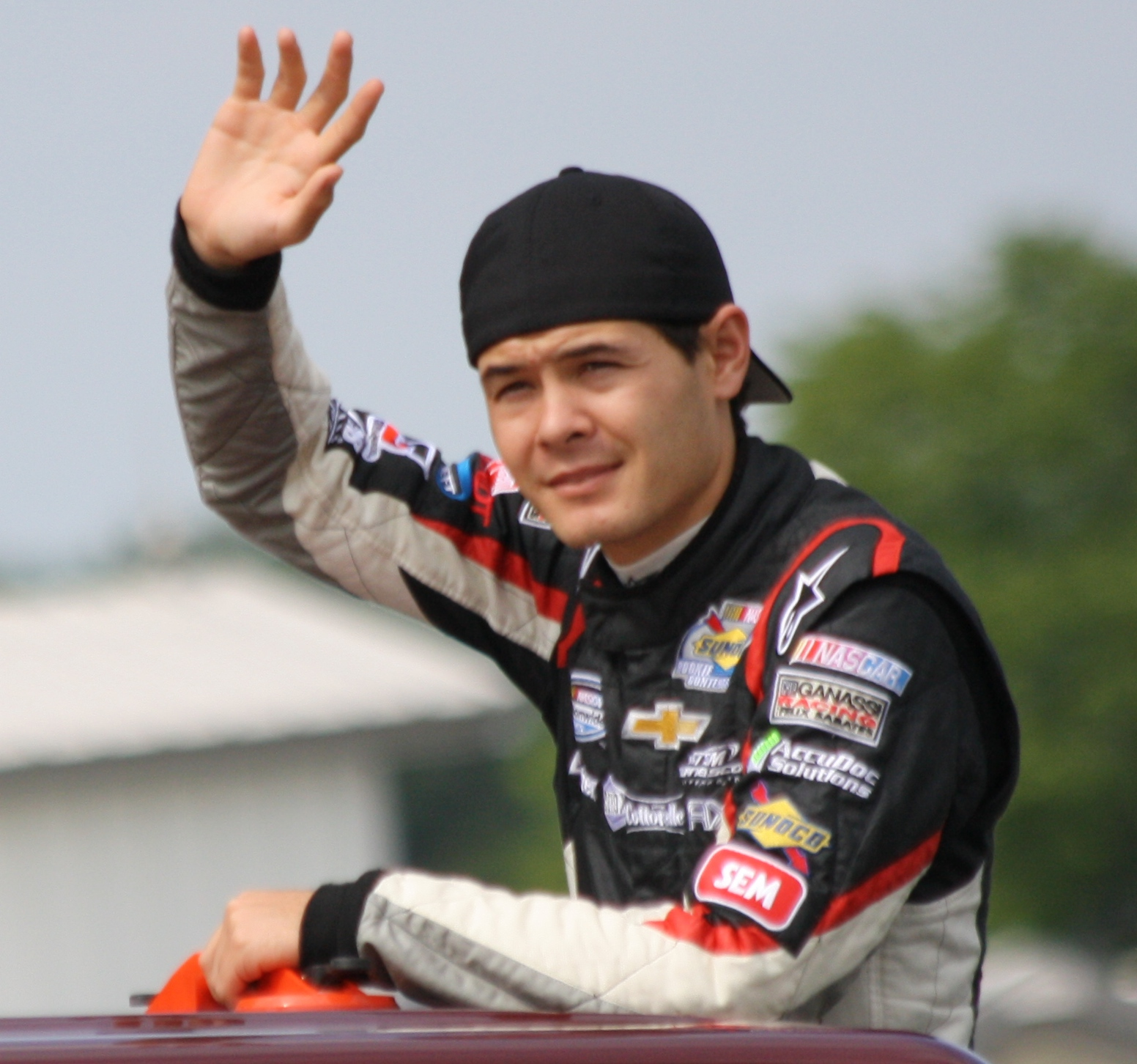
Kyle Larson in the Nationwide Series in 2013.

The most successful driver to go through the program is arguably Kyle Larson, a 2012 graduate who is considered one of the most talented young drivers in the sport. Former Cup champion Dale Jarrett compared Larson's talents to 4-time champion Jeff Gordon, and Gordon himself has taken interest in the young driver. After signing a development deal with Chip Ganassi Racing in 2012, Larson won Rookie of the Year in 2013 in the Nationwide Series for Turner Scott Motorsports, and scored his first victory in the series in 2014. He moved up to Ganassi's No. 42 Sprint Cup Series car for 2014, winning the Rookie of the Year award, and earning his first win in 2016, and soon winning the championship with Hendrick Motorsports in 2021.

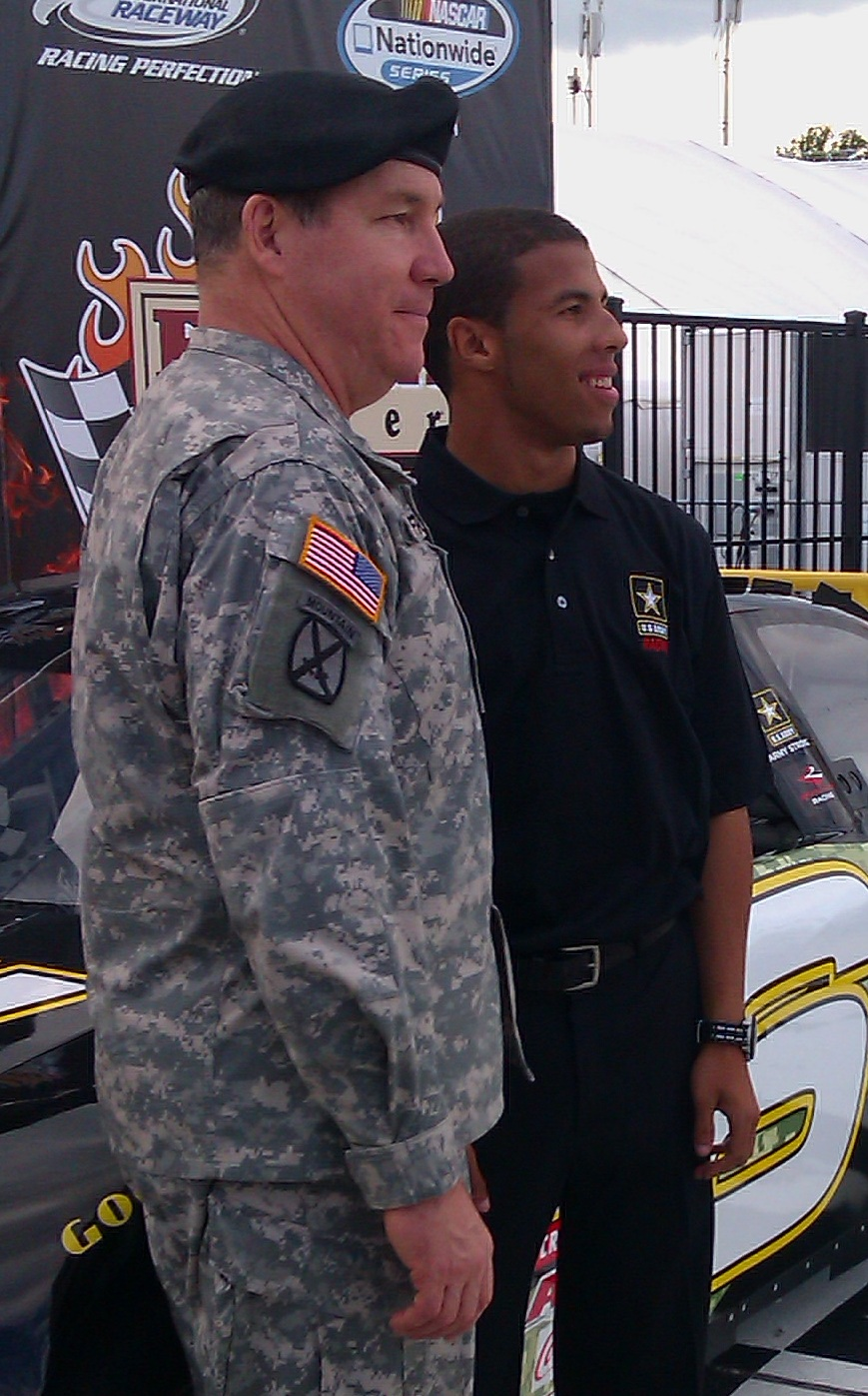
Bubba Wallace in 2011.

Bubba Wallace, a biracial driver of African American heritage, has also found success. Wallace Jr. had three top 10s in four starts for Joe Gibbs Racing in the Nationwide Series in 2012, then moved to the Camping World Truck Series for Kyle Busch Motorsports in 2013. Wallace won in the Truck Series at Martinsville Speedway in his rookie season (only the second black driver after Wendell Scott to win in one of NASCAR's top three divisions). Wallace picked up four more wins in 2014 including one at the famous Eldora Speedway dirt track. Wallace signed to drive in the Xfinity Series for Roush Fenway Racing in 2015. Wallace signed with Monster Energy NASCAR Cup Series team Richard Petty Motorsports in 2018. He currently drives for 23XI, co-owned by Michael Jordan, and finished Top 10 in the Cup standings in 2023. Wallace's career had historically been hampered at the national level by a lack of consistent corporate sponsorship, but that is currently not the case.

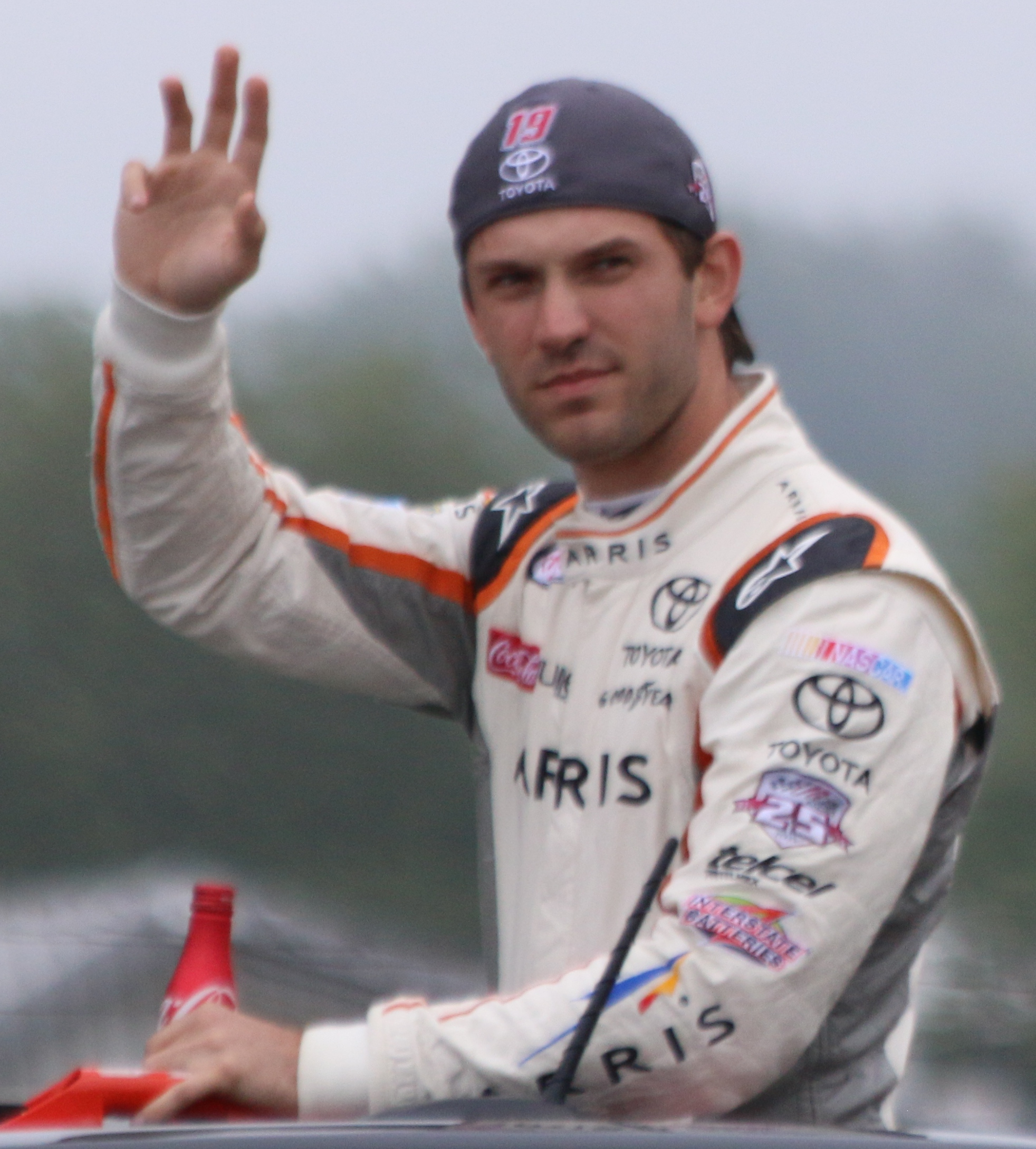
Daniel Suárez in 2016

Another JGR driver, Mexican-born Daniel Suárez, a winner in the K&N Pro Series East and NASCAR Toyota Series, was signed to a full-time Xfinity Series ride for the 2015 season, becoming the first full-time driver of Latino descent to run the full season in the series. Suárez won his first Xfinity Series race at Michigan in 2016, becoming the first Mexican-born driver to win in the series. Suárez went on to win the 2016 NASCAR Xfinity Series championship, becoming the first foreign-born driver to win a NASCAR national series championship. Suárez moved to the Monster Energy NASCAR Cup Series with JGR in 2017. and moved to Stewart–Haas Racing in 2019. He currently drives for Spire Motorsports in the Cup series.

Other drivers from the program, however, have had their careers stall out after "graduating" from the program. This includes Paulie Harraka, who scored the program's first three wins, and Marc Davis who left Joe Gibbs Racing after they could not find sponsorship for him in the Nationwide Series.

=== Other drivers ===
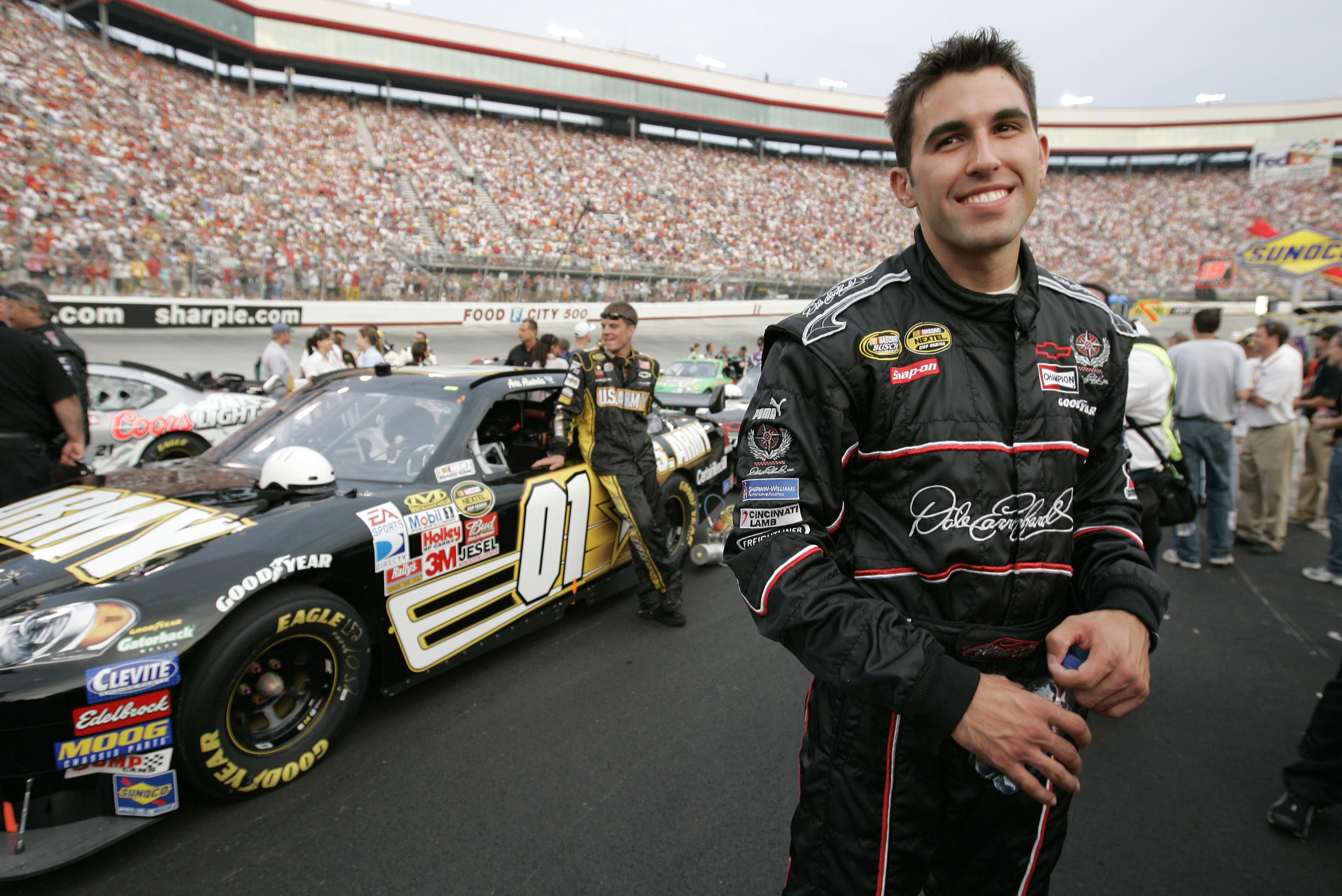
Aric Almirola driving for DEI in 2007.

Outside of the program, minority and female drivers continue to be scarce on the NASCAR scene. Cuban-American driver Aric Almirola, a member of Joe Gibbs Racing's original diversity program, currently drives full-time in Stewart–Haas Racing' 10 car in the Monster Energy NASCAR Cup Series. Almirola is considered one of the most successful products of any diversity initiative within the sport, as well as the highest profile Latino driver in NASCAR, with three wins to his name. Leaving JGR in mid-2007 with one win in the Nationwide Series, Almirola drove Ginn Racing's 01 car and Earnhardt Ganassi Racing's 8 car in the Sprint Cup Series until losing his ride due to lack of sponsorship in 2009. After reclaiming his career with Billy Ballew Motorsports in the truck series and JR Motorsports in the Nationwide Series, Almirola was signed to drive for RPM in 2012, winning at Daytona International Speedway in July 2014.

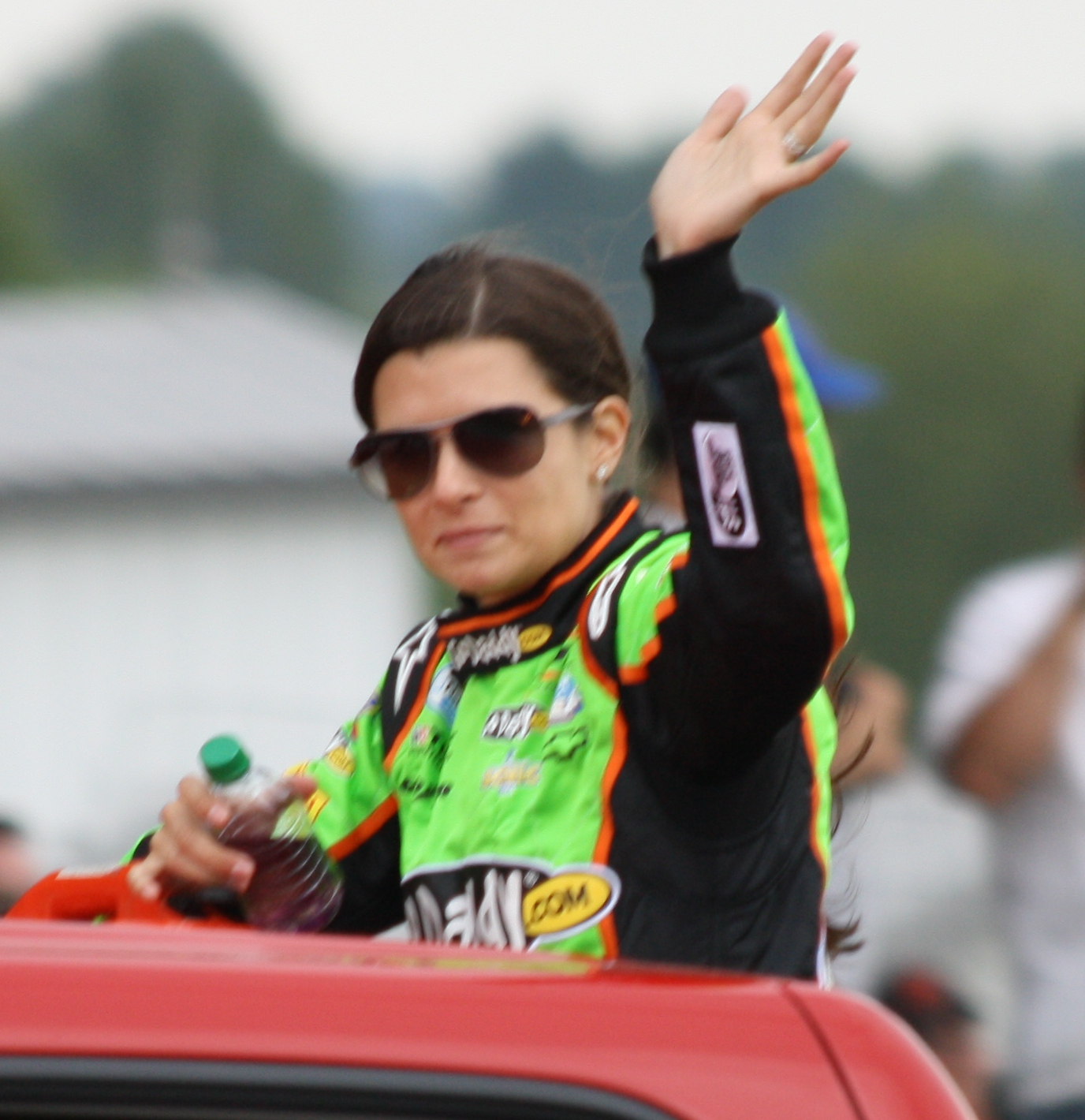
Danica Patrick at Road America in 2012.

Former IndyCar Series racer Danica Patrick drove for Stewart–Haas Racing in their No. 10 Chevrolet SS, from 2012 - 2017, joined by her longtime partner Go Daddy. She is the first female Cup driver to be signed to a full season contract. A winner in IRL competition, Patrick also drove for JR Motorsports in the ARCA Racing Series and Nationwide Series before signing with Stewart-Haas in 2012, and going full-time in the Cup series for 2013. Patrick is the first woman to win the pole for the Daytona 500, and the first rookie to win the pole since Jimmie Johnson in 2002. Patrick also ran the fastest pole speed for the 500 in 23 years, timing in at 45.817 seconds.

Jennifer Jo Cobb is one of few female drivers other than Patrick to run full-time in the three top touring series in recent memory. Cobb made her debut in the Nationwide Series in 2004, and currently drives in the Camping World Truck Series. Cobb is not only a full-time driver, but also the owner of her No. 10 truck for Jennifer Jo Cobb Racing, which is a successor to Circle Bar Racing and ppc Racing. The team also runs a second No. 0 truck as a start and park entry, though it attempted to run the full race at Eldora Speedway in 2013 and 2014 with Jennifer Jo's father Joe Cobb. Though the team runs full-time, lack of funding and second-hand equipment (often running old Dodge Rams without factory support) often results in back-of-the-pack finishes for Cobb.

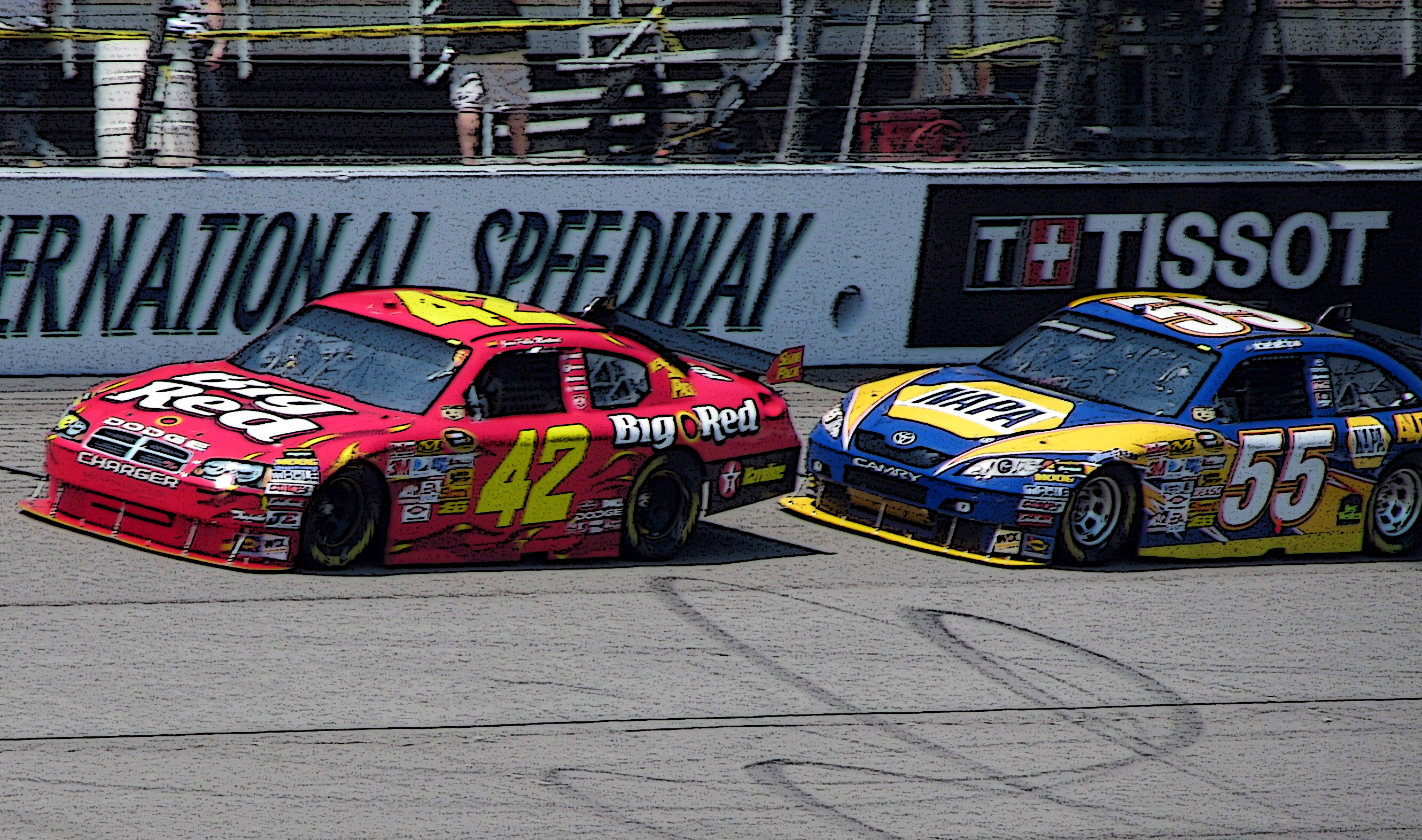
Juan Pablo Montoya's Ganassi Dodge in 2008.

Colombian-born Juan Pablo Montoya, a winner in CART and Formula 1 and the 2000 Indianapolis 500 winner, began running full-time in the Sprint Cup Series with Chip Ganassi Racing in 2007. Juan scored two victories in his career (both coming at road course races), and came close to winning at oval tracks on several occasions. In spite of this, he finished in the top 10 in points only once and departed from full-time NASCAR competition after 2013. Another former open-wheel driver, Brazilian Nelson Piquet Jr. scored two victories in the Truck Series and one in a part-time Nationwide season, but struggled in his first full Nationwide season in 2013 and was released from Turner Scott Motorsports. Piquet Jr. would make his Cup debut in 2014. Other Latino former open-wheel drivers to run in NASCAR include Michel Jourdain Jr. and Adrián Fernández, who ran Busch Series schedules with ppc Racing and Hendrick Motorsports respectively.

From 2000 to 2007, African American driver Bill Lester was a mainstay in the truck series, driving for Bobby Hamilton Racing, Bill Davis Racing, and Billy Ballew Motorsports. Lester was a part of Dodge's and BHR's diversity initiative before signing with Davis on talent alone in 2004, and was notable for his strong qualifying efforts. Lester also made two starts for Davis in the Cup Series, the first African American racer in the series since Willy T. Ribbs. Mexican-born Carlos Contreras has also found longevity in the Nationwide and Truck Series, but has only run three full schedules in his career (and none since 2002), with only 5 top 10s to his credit.

=== NASCAR internationally ===
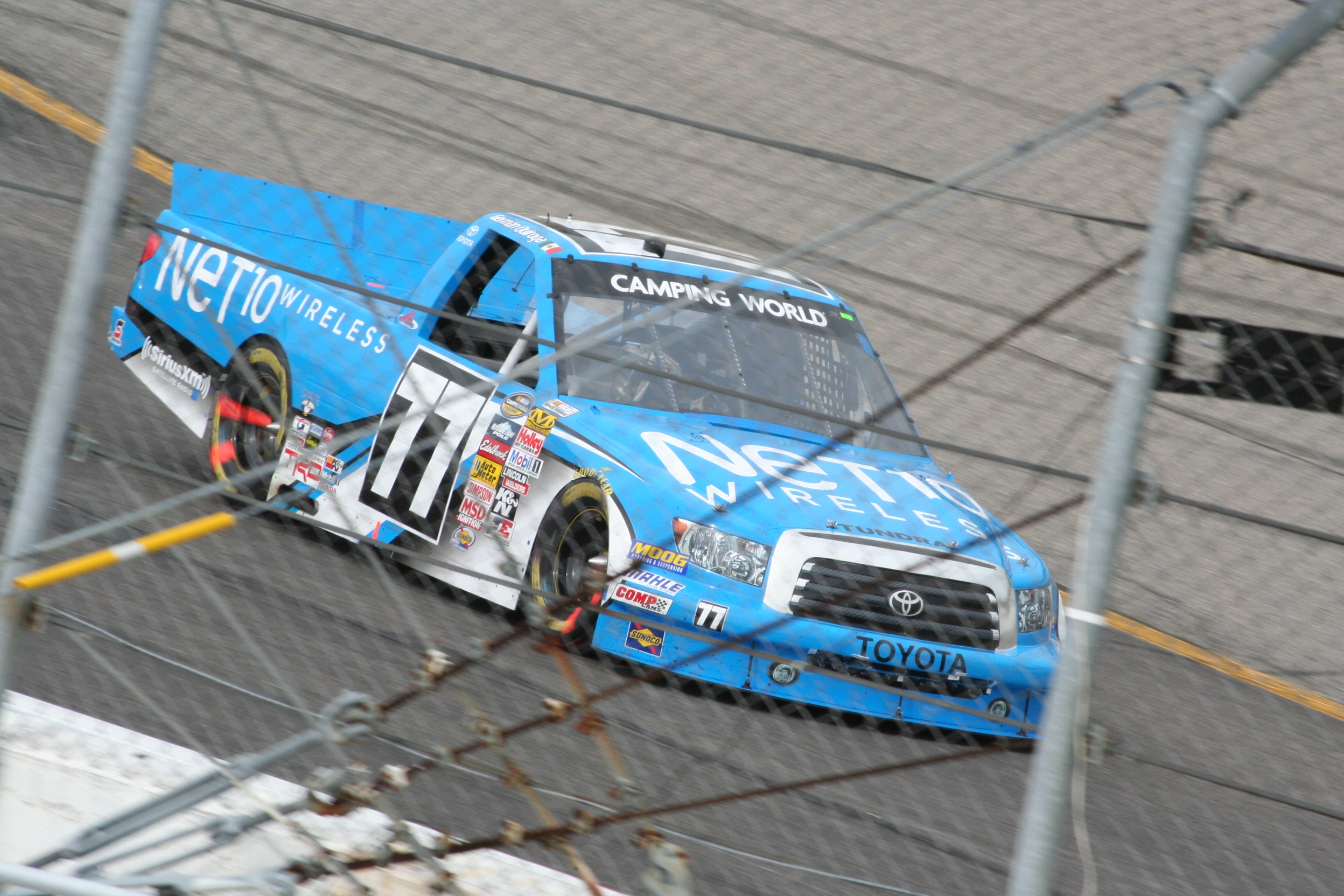
Germán Quiroga's Net10 Wireless Toyota Tundra in 2013.

While diversity within NASCAR's top ranks may be slow, the sports' international influence has grown in the 21st century. Following successful Nationwide Series races at the road courses Autódromo Hermanos Rodríguez in Mexico City and Circuit Gilles Villeneuve in Montreal, the NASCAR Toyota Series (formerly the Corona Series) and NASCAR Canadian Tire Series were created as regional series similar to the K&N Pro Series East and West. In 2009, the NASCAR Whelen Euro Series was inaugurated.

NASCAR Mexico has produced several talented drivers who have moved on to NASCAR's top-three touring series. These include 3-time Toyota Series champion Germán Quiroga who has driven in the Camping World Truck Series for Kyle Busch Motorsports and Red Horse Racing, and D4D driver and 9-time Toyota Series winner and Xfinity Series Champion, Daniel Suárez, currently racing in the NASCAR Cup Series with Trackhouse Racing Team. The Canadian Series has produced D. J. Kennington, J. R. Fitzpatrick, Alex Labbé, and road course ringer Andrew Ranger. The Euro Series has produced Alon Day.

== Drivers ==
=== 2025 ===
The drivers in the 2025 class have not been announced yet.

=== 2024 ===
Drivers	Series	Team
Andrés Pérez de Lara	ARCA Menards Series	Rev Racing
Lavar Scott	ARCA Menards Series	Rev Racing
Nathan Lyons	INEX Legend Cars Series	Rev Racing
Cassidy Keitt	INEX Legend Cars Series	Rev Racing
LaQuan McCoy Jr.	INEX Legend Cars Series	Rev Racing
Eloy Sebastián López Falcón	NASCAR Advance Auto Parts Weekly Series	Rev Racing
Lanie Buice	NASCAR Advance Auto Parts Weekly Series	Rev Racing
T. J. DeCaire	NASCAR Advance Auto Parts Weekly Series	Rev Racing
Regina Sirvent	NASCAR Advance Auto Parts Weekly Series	Rev Racing

=== 2023 ===
Drivers	Series	Team
Andrés Pérez de Lara	ARCA Menards Series	Rev Racing
Lavar Scott	ARCA Menards Series East	Rev Racing
Justin Campbell	NASCAR Advance Auto Parts Weekly Series	Rev Racing
Jaiden Reyna	NASCAR Advance Auto Parts Weekly Series	Rev Racing
Paige Rogers	NASCAR Advance Auto Parts Weekly Series	Rev Racing
Caleb Johnson	INEX Legend Cars Series	Rev Racing
Nathan Lyons	INEX Legend Cars Series	Rev Racing
Eloy Sebastián López Falcón	INEX Legend Cars Series	Rev Racing

=== 2022 ===
Driver	Series	Team
Justin Campbell	INEX Legend Cars Series	Rev Racing
Quinn Davis	INEX Bandoleros Series	Rev Racing
Nathan Lyons	INEX Bandoleros Series	Rev Racing
Andrés Pérez de Lara	NASCAR Mexico Series	Rev Racing
Eloy Sebastian López Falcón	NASCAR Mexico Series	Rev Racing
Regina Sirvent	NASCAR Mexico Series	Rev Racing
Katie Hettinger	NASCAR Advance Auto Parts Weekly Series	Rev Racing
Lucas Vera	NASCAR Advance Auto Parts Weekly Series	Rev Racing
Jaiden Reyna	NASCAR Advance Auto Parts Weekly Series	Rev Racing
Caleb Johnson	ENASCAR	Rev Racing
Jordon Riddick	ASA STARS National Tour	Rev Racing
Paige Rogers	ASA STARS National Tour	Rev Racing

=== 2021 ===
Driver	Series	Team
Nick Sanchez	ARCA Menards Series	Rev Racing
Rajah Caruth	ARCA Menards Series East	Rev Racing
Rajah Caruth	NASCAR Advance Auto Parts Weekly Series	Rev Racing
Isabella Robusto	NASCAR Advance Auto Parts Weekly Series	Rev Racing
Lavar Scott	NASCAR Advance Auto Parts Weekly Series	Rev Racing
Regina Sirvent	NASCAR Advance Auto Parts Weekly Series	Rev Racing
Justin Campbell	INEX Legend Cars Series	Rev Racing
Andrés Pérez de Lara	INEX Legend Cars Series	Rev Racing
Jaiden Reyna	INEX Legend Cars Series	Rev Racing

=== 2020 ===
1. Chase Cabre – ARCA Menards Series East
2. Isabella Robusto – Whelen All-American Series
3. Gracie Trotter – Whelen All-American Series
4. Rajah Caruth – Late Models
5. Perry Patino – Late Models
6. Nick Sanchez – Late Models

=== 2019 ===
1. Chase Cabre – K&N Pro Series East
2. Ernie Francis Jr. – K&N Pro Series East
3. Rubén García Jr. – K&N Pro Series East
4. Brooke Storer – Whelen All-American Series
5. Gracie Trotter – Whelen All-American Series
6. Nick Sanchez – Late Models
7. Lacy Kuehl - INEX LEGEND CARS

=== 2018 ===
1. Chase Cabre – K&N Pro Series East
2. Ernie Francis Jr. – K&N Pro Series East
3. Rubén García Jr. – K&N Pro Series East
4. Ryan Vargas – K&N Pro Series East
5. Nick Sanchez – Late Models
6. Isabella Robusto – Legends Cars

=== 2017 ===
1. Chase Cabre – K&N Pro Series East
2. Collin Cabre – K&N Pro Series East
3. Rubén García Jr. – K&N Pro Series East
4. Jay Beasley – K&N Pro Series East
5. Macy Causey – Whelen All-American Series
6. Madeline Crane – Whelen All-American Series

=== 2016 ===
1. Collin Cabre – K&N Pro Series East
2. Rubén García Jr. – K&N Pro Series East; 2015 NASCAR Mexico Series champion.
3. Jairo Avila Jr. – K&N Pro Series East
4. Ali Kern – K&N Pro Series East
5. Enrique Baca – Whelen All-American Series
6. Juan Garcia – Whelen All-American Series

Among the drivers not selected were 2014 NASCAR Mexico Series champion Abraham Calderón, and former D4D/Rev Racing drivers Dylan Smith and Natalie Decker.

=== 2015 ===
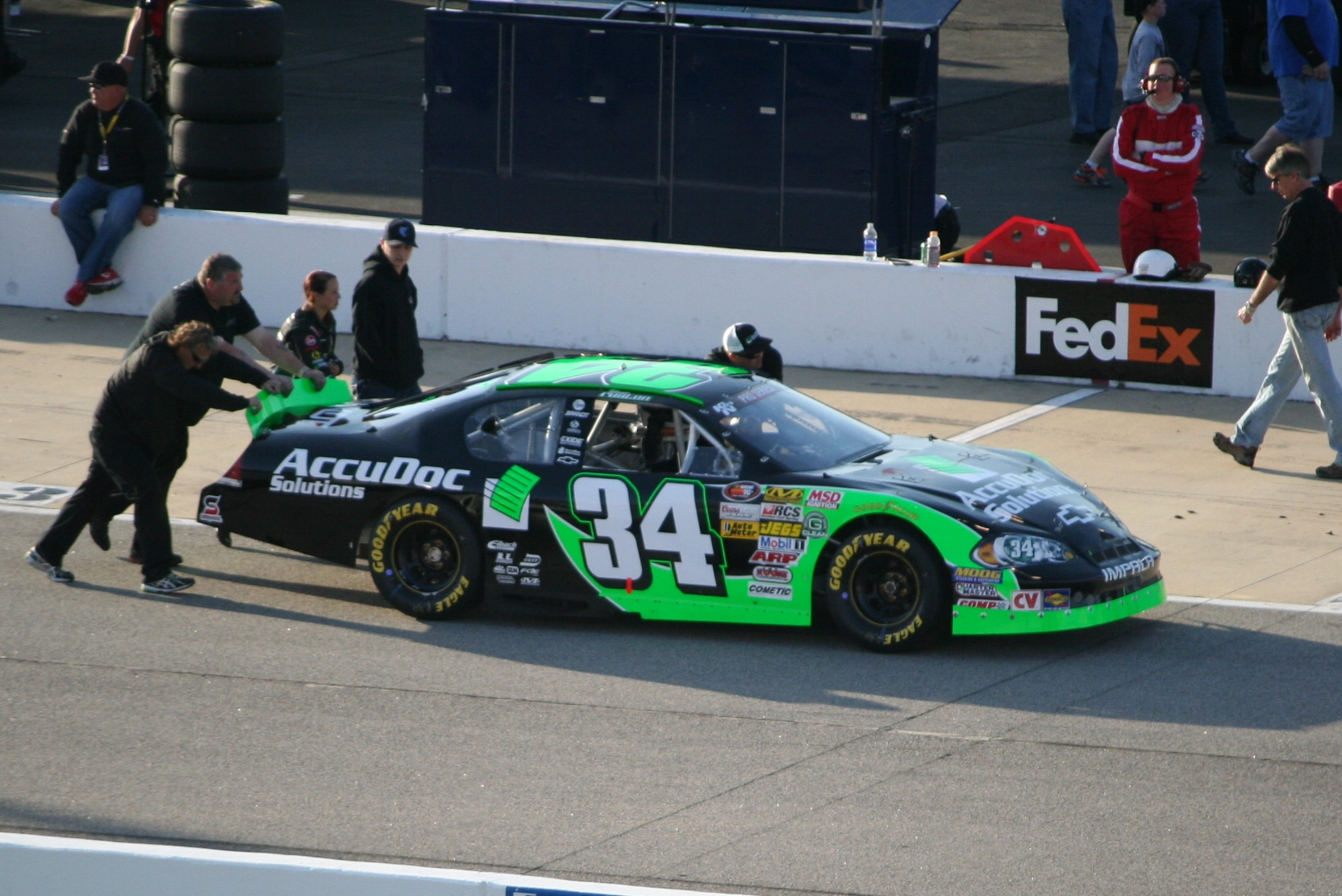
Kenzie Ruston drove for Rev Racing in 2015.

1. Devon Amos – K&N Pro Series East
2. Jay Beasley – K&N Pro Series East
3. Collin Cabre – K&N Pro Series East; one win (Dover), 10th in points.
4. Natalie Decker – Whelen All-American Series
5. Kenzie Ruston – K&N Pro Series East; earned highest finish for a female in a K&N Pro Series East race of 2nd in 2014 with Ben Kennedy Racing
6. Dylan Smith – Whelen All-American Series

Among the 14 drivers not selected were 2014 NASCAR Mexico Series champion Abraham Calderón and former D4D/Rev Racing driver Paige Decker.

=== 2014 ===
1. Devon Amos
2. Jay Beasley – two top fives in K&N East Series
3. Paige Decker
4. Ryan Gifford – one top five in K&N East, one Nationwide race for Biagi-DenBeste Racing (20th place in Iowa)
5. Sergio Pena – One K&N East win
6. Daniel Suárez – Four wins in Toyota Series, two K&N East wins, two Nationwide starts, signed to drive for Joe Gibbs Racing in the Xfinity Series in 2015

=== 2013 ===
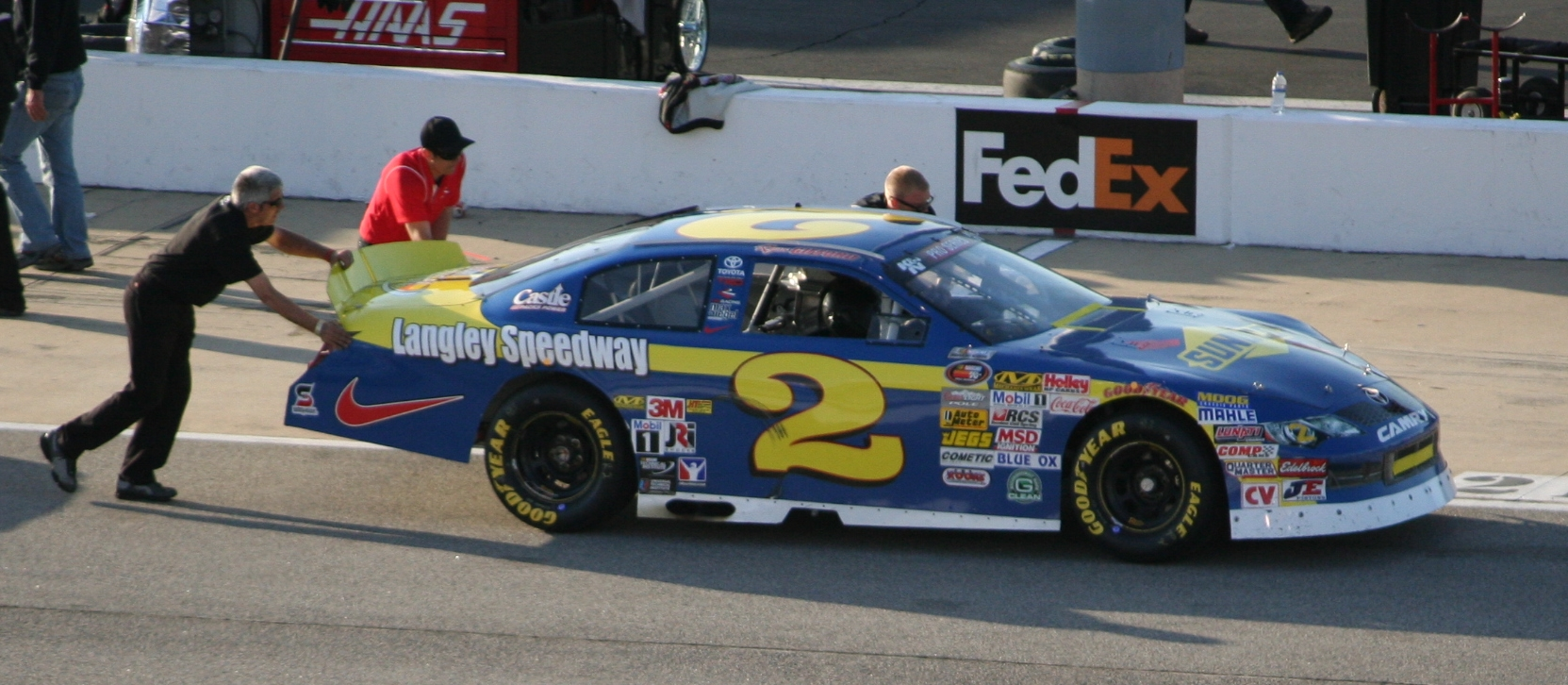
Ryan Gifford scored a top 10 at Iowa in the Nationwide Series for RCR in 2013.

1. Annabeth Barnes
2. Mackena Bell – K&N Pro Series East: 2 top fives, 13th in points
3. Ryan Gifford – K&N Pro Series East: Win at Richmond, 11th in points; finished ninth in Iowa Nationwide race
4. Jack Madrid
5. Bryan Ortiz – K&N Pro Series East: 2 top fives, 10th in points
6. Daniel Suárez – NASCAR Toyota Series (3 wins, 2nd in points), K&N East (one win, third in points)

=== 2012 ===
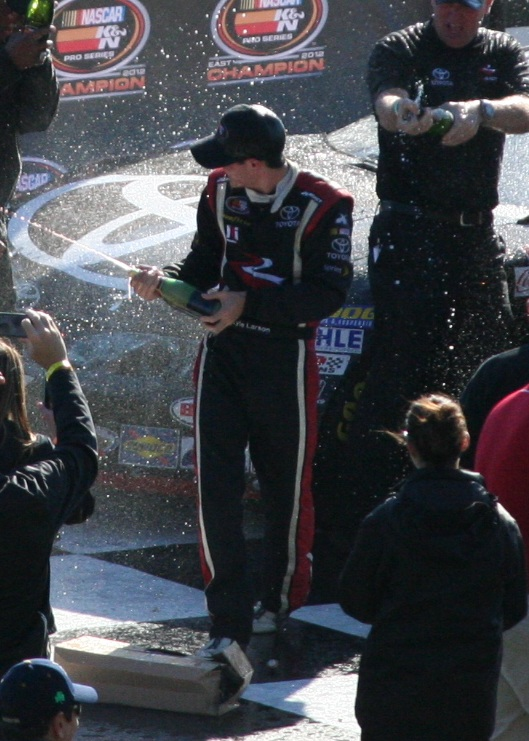
Kyle Larson formerly drove in the Sprint Cup Series for Ganassi.

1. Jorge Arteaga – K&N Pro Series East – two top tens, 14th in points
2. Mackena Bell – Whelen All-American Series
3. Trey Gibson – Whelen All-American Series
4. Ryan Gifford – K&N Pro Series East – 11th in points, two top fives, three top tens
5. Kyle Larson – K&N Pro Series East – two wins, one pole, won 2012 series championship, series Rookie of the Year; three top tens in four Camping World Truck Series events, including second at Phoenix; currently driving in the NASCAR Cup Series for Hendrick Motorsports
6. Bryan Ortiz – K&N Pro Series East, fifth in points, two top fives, nine top tens

=== 2011 ===
1. Jorge Arteaga – Whelen All-American Series
2. Mackena Bell – Whelen All-American, ran six K&N Pro Series East races
3. Jessica Brunelli – Whelen All-American, ran four K&N Pro Series West races in 2011
4. Michael Cherry – K&N Pro Series East, 14th in points
5. Trey Gibson – Whelen All-American
6. Ryan Gifford – K&N Pro Series East, tenth in points
7. Tayla Orleans – Whelen All-American
8. Bryan Ortiz – Whelen All-American
9. Sergio Pena – K&N Pro Series East – Won races at South Boston, Hampton, and Greenville-Pickens, fifth in series points
10. Bubba Wallace – K&N Pro Series East – Won at Richmond International Raceway, Columbus, and Dover International Speedway; pole positions at South Boston, Loudon, and Dover, second in series points

=== 2010 ===
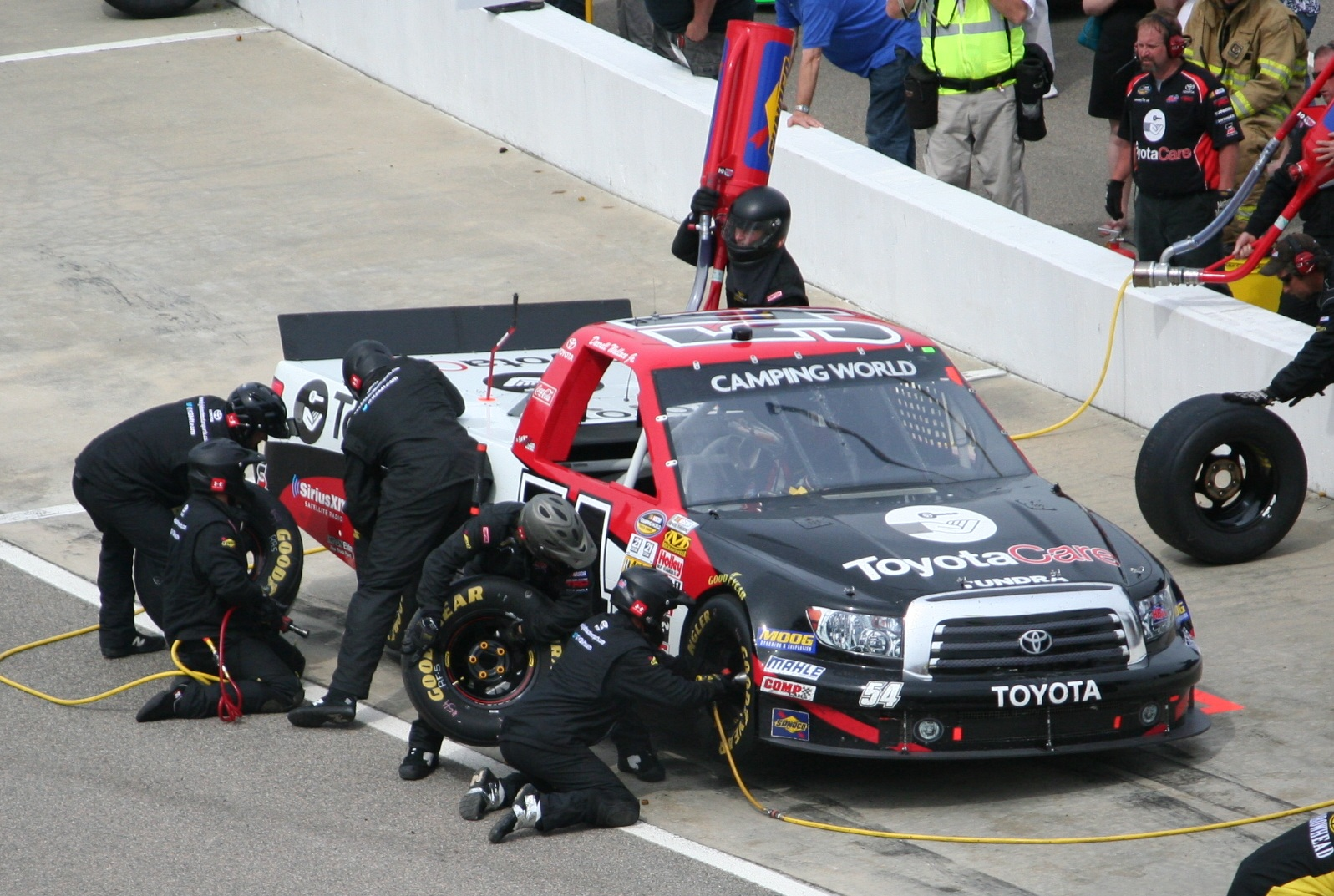
Bubba Wallace is a winner in the Truck Series, and signed with Roush Fenway Racing.

1. Mackena Bell – K&N Pro Series East
2. Jessica Brunelli – Whelen All-American Series
3. Michael Cherry – Whelen All-American Series
4. Ryan Gifford – K&N Pro Series East – First African-American to win a pole position in series (June 6 at Martinsville Speedway)
5. Katie Hagar – Whelen All-American Series
6. Paulie Harraka – K&N Pro Series West
7. Rebecca Kasten – Whelen All-American Series
8. Sergio Pena – K&N Pro Series East
9. Megan Reitenour – Whelen All-American Series
10. Jason Romero – Whelen All-American Series
11. Bubba Wallace – K&N Pro Series East – In March 2010, he won the race at Greenville-Pickens Speedway and became the first African-American and the youngest driver to win in the series. He also won the Lee USA Speedway event in July. Overall, Wallace finished third in points and earned series Rookie of the Year honors.

=== 2009 ===
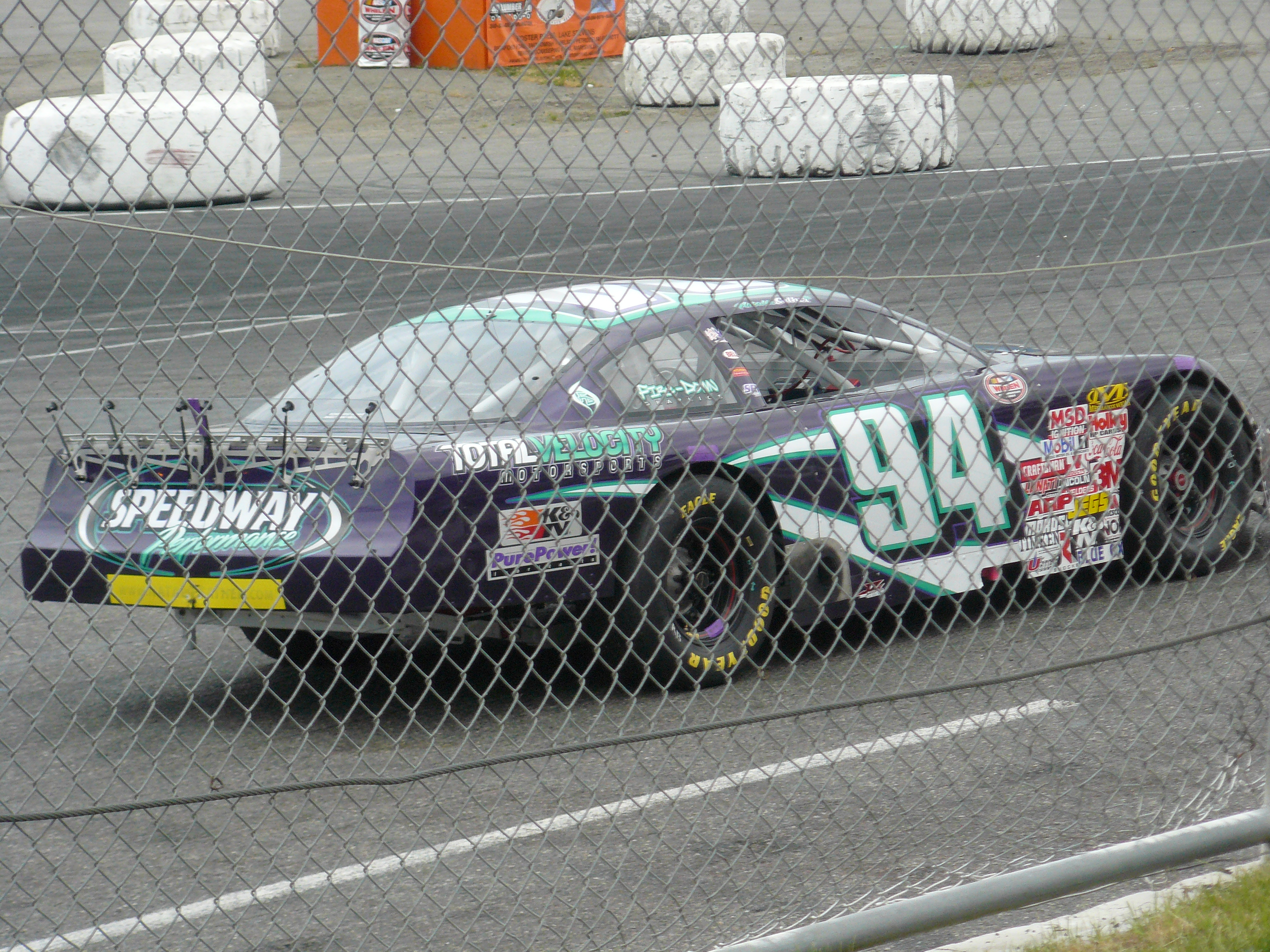
Natalie Sather's car at Evergreen Speedway in 2009.

1. Mackena Bell
2. Kristin Bumbera
3. Michael Cherry
4. Jonathon Gomez
5. Katie Hagar
6. Paulie Harraka – The first member to win a race in a NASCAR regional touring series event (Camping World West Series event at Colorado National Speedway in August 2009). He won the September event at All-American Speedway en route to series Rookie of the Year honors and fourth in the standings.
7. Laura Hayes
8. Juan Pitts
9. Megan Reitenour
10. Natalie Sather
11. Jonathan Smith
12. Emily Sue Steck

=== 2008 ===
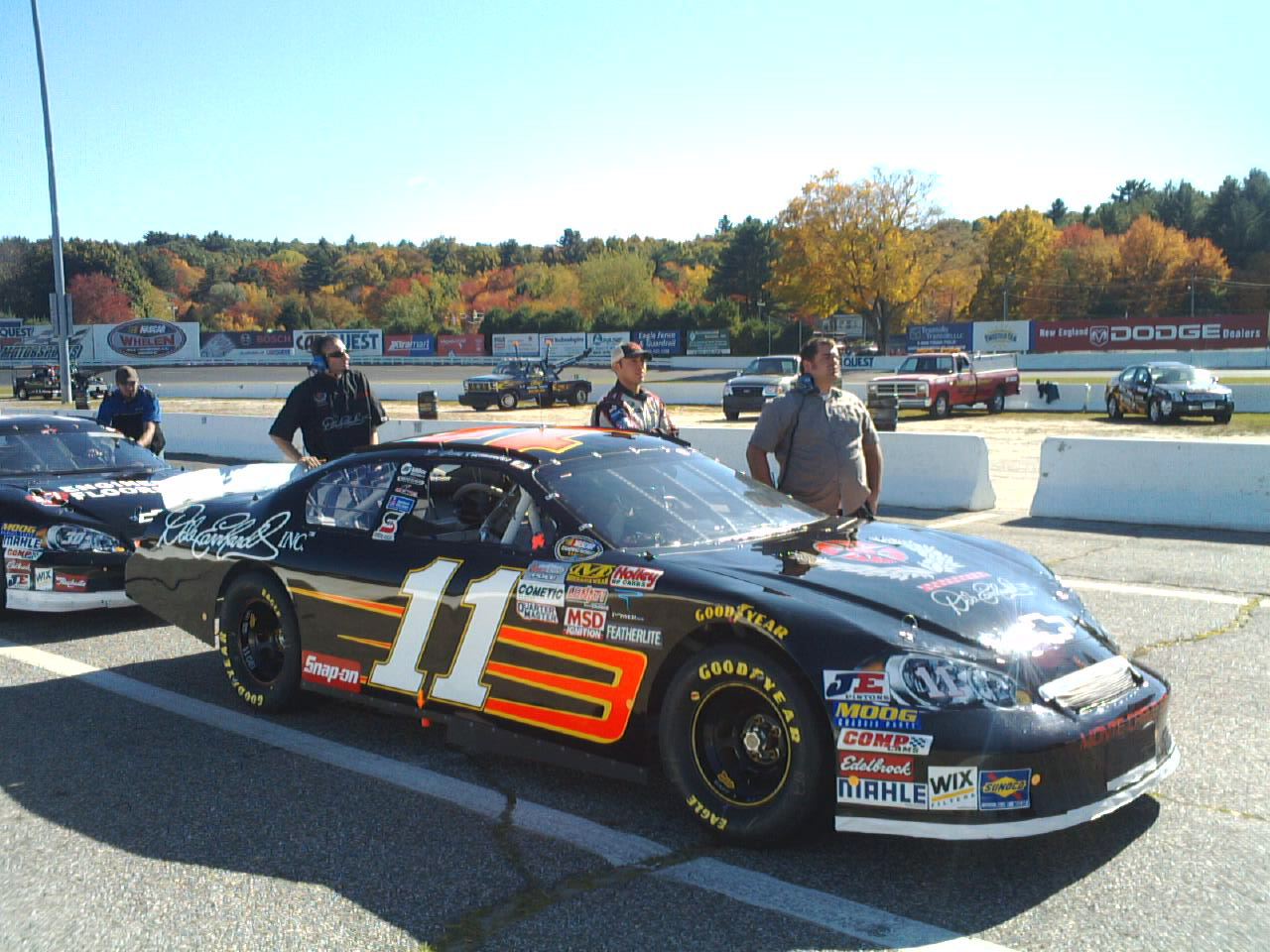
Jesus Hernandez is a former development driver for Ginn Racing and Dale Earnhardt, Inc.

1. Kristin Bumbera
2. Michael Cherry
3. Michael Gallegos
4. Paulie Harraka
5. Jesus Hernandez
6. Lindsey King
7. Lloyd Mack
8. Jonathan Smith

=== 2007 ===
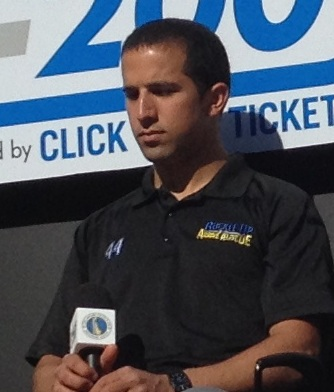
Paulie Harraka has made starts in the Sprint Cup Series and the Xfinity Series.

1. Michael Gallegos
2. Paulie Harraka
3. Jessica Helberg
4. Jesus Hernandez
5. Peter Hernandez
6. Lloyd Mack
7. Jonathan Smith

=== 2006 ===
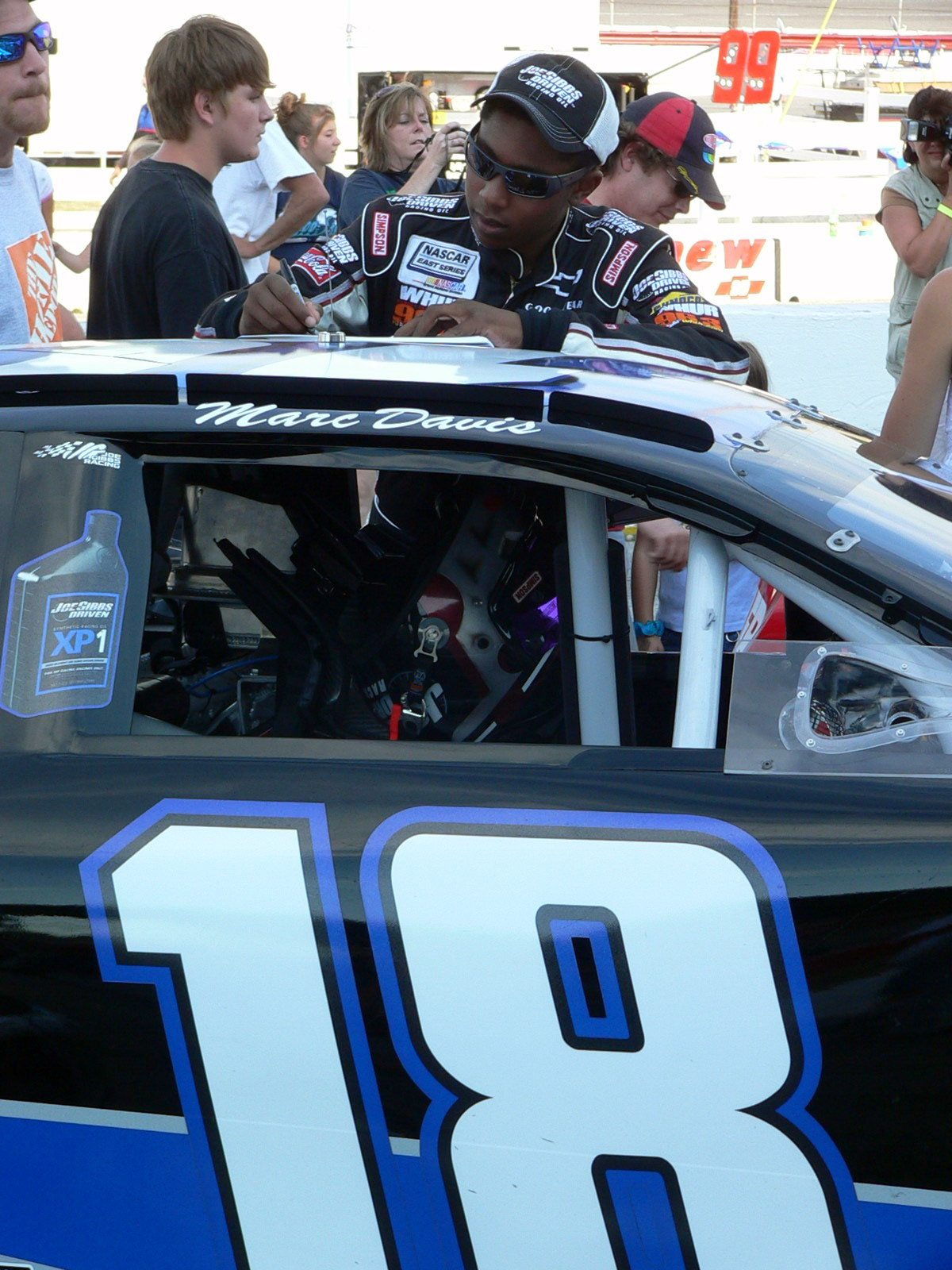
Marc Davis, formerly a driver for JGR has made starts in the Xfinity and Truck Series.

1. Chris Bristol
2. Brianne Cronrath
3. Marc Davis
4. Allison Duncan
5. Paulie Harraka
6. Jessica Helberg
7. Jesus Hernandez – Signed to a development contract with MB2 Motorsports.
8. Peter Hernandez

=== 2005 ===
Driver	Series	Team
Morty Buckles	NASCAR Weekly Racing Series	Belnavis Racing
Brianne Cronrath	NASCAR Weekly Racing Series	Belnavis Racing
Allison Duncan	NASCAR Weekly Racing Series	Bill McAnally Racing / Richard Childress Racing
Sarah Fisher	NASCAR Weekly Racing Series	Bill McAnally Racing / Richard Childress Racing
Michael Gallegos	NASCAR Weekly Racing Series	
Joe Henderson III	NASCAR Weekly Racing Series	MB2 Motorsports
Jesus Hernandez	NASCAR Weekly Racing Series	MB2 Motorsports
Tommy Lane	NASCAR Weekly Racing Series	Evernham Motorsports
Terri Williams	NASCAR Weekly Racing Series	

=== 2004 ===
Driver	Series	Team
Morty Buckles	NASCAR Weekly Racing Series	Belnavis Racing
Bruce Driver	NASCAR Weekly Racing Series	SCORE Motorsports
Allison Duncan	NASCAR Weekly Racing Series	BH Motorsports
Joe Henderson III	NASCAR Weekly Racing Series	Bobby Hamilton Racing
Reggie Primus	NASCAR Weekly Racing Series	Innovative Motorsports

== Teams involved in the Drive for Diversity ==
=== Current ===
- Rev Racing

=== Former ===
- Belnavis Racing – owned by then-Roush Racing executive Sam Belnavis
- Bill McAnally Racing
- Bobby Hamilton Racing
- Evernham Motorsports
- FDJ Motorsports
- Ginn Racing / MB2 Motorsports
- Golden State Racing
- High Point Racing
- Ken Schrader Racing
- Richard Childress Racing
- Roadrunner Motorsports
- RTD Motorsports
- SCORE Motorsports
- TW Motorsports
- Rev Racing

== Minority and female-owned teams in NASCAR ==
=== Current ===
- B. J. McLeod Motorsports - Co-owned by Jessica Smith-McLeod
- Beard Motorsports - Co-owned by Annie Beard and Linda Beard
- Hyak Motorsports (formerly JTG-Daugherty Racing) - Co-owned by Brad Daugherty
- Jennifer Jo Cobb Racing - Owned by Jennifer Jo Cobb
- Jesse Iwuji Motorsports - Co-owned by Jesse Iwuji and Emmitt Smith
- JR Motorsports - Co-owned by Kelley Earnhardt Miller
- NY Racing Team (formerly Team Xtreme Racing and Xxxtreme Motorsport) - Owned by John Cohen
- Our Motorsports - Co-owned by Mary Our
- RSS Racing - Co-owned by Pamela Sieg
- ThorSport Racing - Co-owned by Rhonda Thorson
- 23XI Racing - Co-owned by Michael Jordan

=== Former ===
- Angela's Motorsports
- BAM Racing
- BelCar Racing - Co-owned by Sam Belnavis
- Chip Ganassi Racing - Founded by Felix Sabates as Team SABCO, then co-owned the team as Chip Ganassi Racing with Felix Sabates until 2020.
- Dale Earnhardt, Inc. - Operated by Teresa Earnhardt from 2001 to 2008.
- Fitz Motorsports
- Hattori Racing Enterprises - Owned by Shigeaki Hattori
- Hispanic Racing Team
- Kyle Busch Motorsports - Co-owned by Samantha Busch
- Liberty Racing
- Marc Davis Racing
- ML Motorsports
- Obaika Racing
- Randy Moss Motorsports - formerly Morgan-Dollar Motorsports
- SCORE Motorsports
- Smith-Ganassi Racing - Co-owned by Evander Holyfield
- Team Paradigm
- The Money Team Racing (now Team AmeriVet) - Was co-owned by Floyd Mayweather from 2019 to 2024
- Trackhouse Racing Team - Was co-owned by Pitbull from 2021 to 2025
- Victory Motorsports
- Vizion Motorsports - Co-owned by Jennifer Brown
- Washington-Erving Motorsports

== See also ==
- Driver development program
- List of female NASCAR drivers
- List of African-American NASCAR drivers
- List of Hispanic and Latin American NASCAR drivers
