= Morty Buckles =

American racing driver

- Born: 1971 or 1972 (age 54–55) Stone Mountain, Georgia, U.S.
- Years active: 1995–2006
- Statistics up to date as of September 1, 2014.

Morty Buckles (born 1971 or 1972) is an American racing driver. An African American, Buckles was a member of NASCAR's first Drive for Diversity class after cutting his teeth at the regional racing level. In 2006, Buckles planned to race in the ARCA Racing Series and Sprint Cup Series with a team owned by former NFL wide receiver Terance Mathis, but the deal ultimately fell through. Buckles has a degree in mechanical engineering from Southern Polytechnic State University, and has served as an instructor at the Richard Petty Driving Experience.

== History ==
=== Early career ===
Buckles began racing go-karts at age six. Driving in the World Karting Association, he won 22 races in his first year and 161 out of 252 total starts. For much of his career, he had to race out of his own pocket, getting the most out of second class equipment and holding his own with local legends. Buckles calls the son of Wendell Scott, Wendell Scott Jr. his mentor. From 1995 to 1998, Buckles drove in the Sportsman and Late model divisions at Lanier Raceplex. In 1999, he competed in seven PARTS Pro Truck events at Concord Speedway, earning several top-fives and the "Hard Charger" award for passing the most trucks in a race. In 2000, he attended the Skip Barber Racing School and was the fastest in his class.

In 2001, Buckles drove a Pontiac Late model in the NASCAR Weekly Racing Series for the Miller Racing Group, run by black owners Leonard W. Miller and his son Leonard T. Miller. According to the junior Miller, Buckles possessed the talent "to be the next Dale Earnhardt," but that he needed "5,000 practice laps" to be ready for the Cup Series. In January, the team signed a one-year contract with Dr. Pepper, with the sponsorship rumored to be as high as $100,000. The deal involved the Rev. Jesse Jackson and his Rainbow/PUSH initiative. Buckles reached victory lane in July at Coastal Plains Speedway, the first black driver to win a NASCAR sanctioned event since Wendell Scott's legendary win (though Bubba Wallace would go on to get the first series win in one of the three national series since Scott in 2013). After his victory, Morty was sent "straight to the podium...as other competitors 'waved rebel flags at [him] in defiance.'" Overall, Buckles finished in the top ten in 80 percent of his races.

Buckles participated in an ARCA Racing Series test session at Daytona International Speedway in December 2001 for Bobby Gerhart in a number 7 Chevrolet. He clocked in at 50.356 seconds (178.727 mph), 19th fastest. Rich Woodland Jr. would ultimately drive the car at the Daytona season-opener for 2002.

=== Drive for Diversity ===
In 2004, Buckles was selected to be part of NASCAR's first Drive for Diversity class for that season, driving the No. 54 National Guard Ford in the Late model division of the NASCAR Weekly Racing Series, splitting the year between Southampton Motor Speedway and Motor Mile Speedway in Virginia. Buckles drove for Belnavis Racing, owned by Roush Racing's chief diversity officer Sam Belnavis (Roush ran the National Guard sponsorship in the Cup Series). The team was also supported by Travis Carter Motorsports (which ran the No. 54 National Guard Ford in the Cup Series the previous season in a partnership with Belnavis). Buckles posted 15 top 10s in 19 races. Later in the year, Buckles participated in a recruitment combine for Roush Racing (now Roush Fenway Racing), frequently referred to as The Gong Show, at North Wilkesboro Speedway.

Buckles returned to the program and the 54 car in 2005, but was one of several drivers to depart from the D4D program due to feeling limited by the equipment and resources provided to them.

=== Victory Motorsports ===
In July 2005, Buckles left the Diversity program to join former NFL wide receiver Terance Mathis and his new race team Victory Motorsports, planning to race in the Nextel Cup Series and ARCA Racing Series. Established Cup team Morgan-McClure Motorsports (which received support and engines from Hendrick Motorsports) would provide technical support for the new No. 04 Chevrolet. In a 2005 test session at Kentucky Speedway, Roush Racing Cup driver Carl Edwards noticed Morty's performance, saying "Where has this guy been hiding?" Mathis and the 34-year-old Buckles ambitiously planned 20 Cup races and a dozen ARCA races for 2006, but the deal never fully materialized. Buckles attempted one ARCA race at Nashville Speedway with ST2 Motorsports, failing to qualify in their No. 67 Dodge. Mathis would later attempt to purchase RJ Racing and their No. 37 Dodge team, but that deal would also fall through.

== Personal life ==
Buckles has a wife Maria, also an engineer, and three children (Jada, Jordan, and Justin).

Buckles and his father are family friends of former driver Ken Ragan and current Sprint Cup Series driver David Ragan, both of whom are also Georgia natives. The Buckles relationship with the Ragans goes back to the 1940s, when Morty Buckles' grandfather worked as a mechanic on the race team owned by Ken Ragan's father (David Ragan's grandfather).
