= Rev Racing =

American stock car racing team

Revolution Racing
- Owner: Max Siegel
- Base: Concord, North Carolina
- Series: ARCA Menards Series; ARCA Menards Series East; ARCA Menards Series West; Advance Auto Parts Weekly Series; INEX Legend Car Series
- Race drivers: ARCA Menards Series: 2. Lanie Buice, Eloy Sebastian (part-time); 6. Lavar Scott; ARCA Menards Series East: 2. Lanie Buice (part-time); 6. Lavar Scott (part-time); 10. Eloy Sebastian (part-time); ARCA Menards Series West: 6. Lavar Scott (part-time); Advance Auto Parts Weekly: 2. Eloy Sebastian, Lavar Scott; 6. Nathan Lyons; 8. Cassidy Keitt
- Manufacturer: Chevrolet

Career
- Debut: 2010
- Latest race: 2025 Owens Corning 200
- Drivers' Championships: ARCA Menards Series: 2 (2022, 2024); ARCA Menards Series East: 1 (2012)
- Race victories: Truck Series: 2 ARCA Menards Series: 4 ARCA Menards Series East: 21

Rev Racing, short for Revolution Racing, was an auto racing team competing at the regional level of NASCAR. Owned by former Dale Earnhardt, Inc. president Max Siegel, the team primarily fielded participants in the Drive for Diversity, an initiative to bring more minority and female drivers into the sport. Formerly in all three ARCA Menards Series, the team last fielded two Chevrolet SS teams: The No. 2 part-time for Lanie Buice and the No. 6 full-time for Lavar Scott. The team also fielded late model entries for various drivers, and has fielded entries for future NASCAR national series winners Kyle Larson, Bubba Wallace, and Daniel Suárez in the past. The team formally competed in the NASCAR Craftsman Truck Series.

== History ==
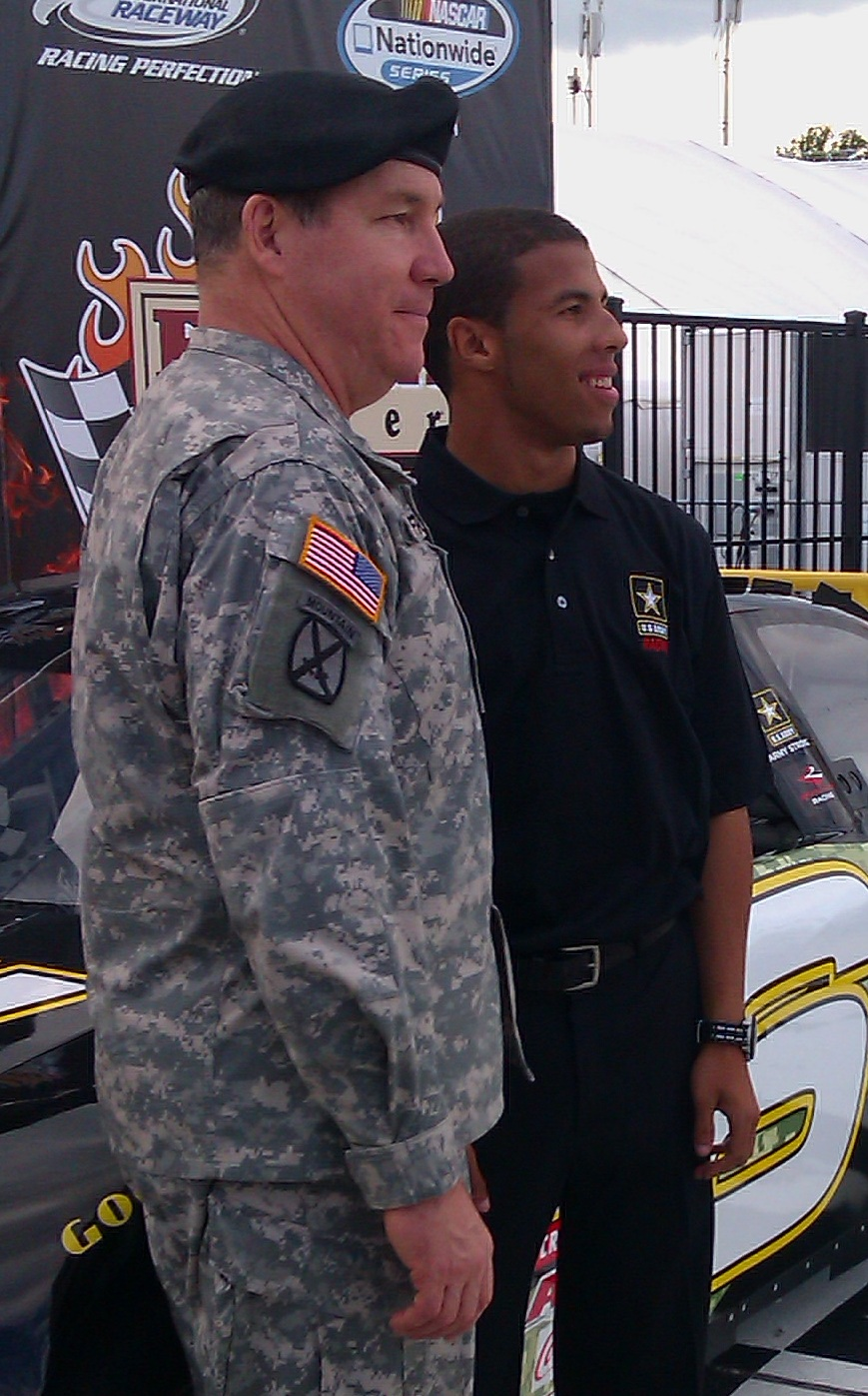
Bubba Wallace in 2011.

Following the 2008 season, NASCAR cut ties with the Drive for Diversity's managing company Access Marketing & Communications after several reports of teams not receiving adequate funds, drivers not receiving competitive equipment, and limited results on the track. NASCAR proceeded to hire Max Siegel to revamp the program into an academy-like setting. In 2010, Siegel founded Rev Racing to field the drivers in the K&N Pro Series and Weekly Series and is also responsible for finding sponsorship for the drivers. By the end of 2011, Rev Racing had more than doubled the win total of the previous D4D program, winning a total of eight races in the K&N Pro Series (compared to three wins in the old program, all by Paulie Harraka).

2010

For its inaugural season, Revolution Racing purchased the equipment from Andy Santerre Racing, with Santerre becoming the team's general manager and a crew chief. In its debut season, Rev Racing fielded ten drivers: four in the K&N Pro Series East, one in the NASCAR K&N Pro Series West, and five in the Whelen All-American Series. Paulie Harraka, in his fifth year in the D4D program, finished third in the K&N West Series standings including a pole and a win in the season opener at All American Speedway. Bubba Wallace won rookie of the year in the K&N East Series, with two wins and a third-place points finish. In addition to Wallace being the first African American to win a race in the series, teammate Ryan Gifford became the first black driver to win a pole (at Martinsville Speedway). Gifford would finish ninth in points.

2011

Wallace continued his success in 2011, winning three races, three poles, and finishing second in series points. He and Gifford were joined by Sergio Pena, who won three races in the K&N East Series as well, finishing fifth in points. Overall, the team won half of all the K&N East Series races.

2012

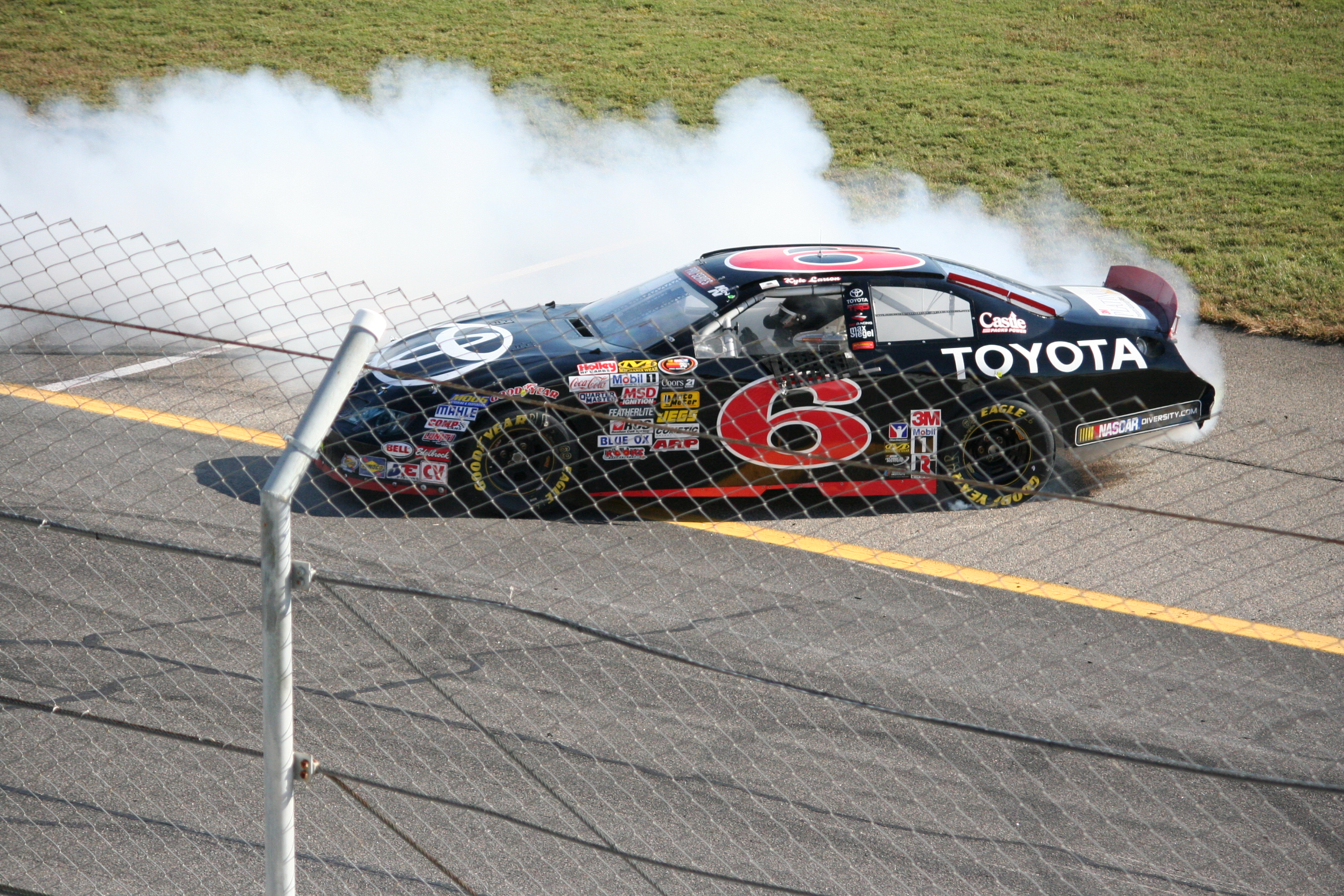
Kyle Larson winning at Rockingham Speedway in 2012.

For 2012, the team downsized from ten drivers to six but added talented driver Kyle Larson to its stable. Larson had the team and D4D's best season to date, winning two races and earning 12 top-tens en route to the K&N East Series Championship.

2013

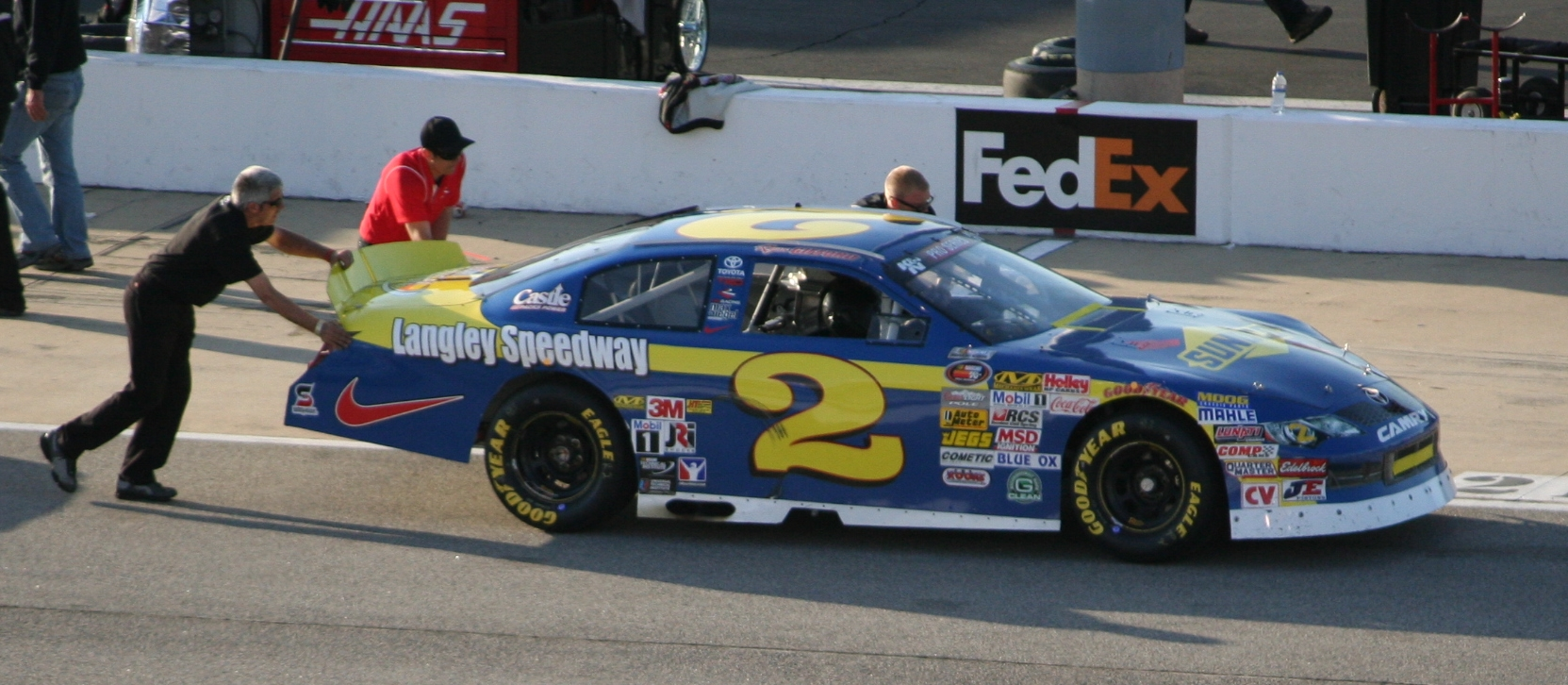
Ryan Gifford's winning car at Richmond in 2013.

In 2013, NASCAR Toyota Series driver and Mexico native Daniel Suárez joined the team, running both the Toyota Series in Mexico and the K&N East Series for Rev Racing. Suarez won at Columbus Motor Speedway, and finished third in points with nine top-tens. He moved to the NASCAR Mexico Series – now the NASCAR Toyota Series – in 2010, driving for Telcel Racing; despite running only a partial season, he won the series' Rookie of the Year title. Ryan Gifford won his first race, the Blue Ox 100, on April 27 at Richmond International Raceway. Gifford started 11th and worked his way to the front, beating Brandon Gdovic and Cole Custer on a late-race restart. Gifford would finish 11th in points with four top-fives and six top-tens.

2014

For 2014, Suarez, Pena, and Gifford returned as D4D drivers, while Mackena Bell returned for her fifth season (though not part of D4D). They were joined by rookie K&N East driver Jay Beasley and Whelen All-American drivers Devon Amos and Paige Decker.

2015

Beasley returned to the K&N East Series, joined by Amos. Newcomers to the team included NASCAR Next member Kenzie Ruston, Collin Cabre, Natalie Decker, and Dylan Smith.

2022

On December 9, 2021, Chevrolet announced a multi-year engineering and marketing partnership with Rev Racing. By the end of the 2022 season, Nick Sanchez claimed the team's first ARCA championship.

2024

At the conclusion of the season finale at Toledo, Andrés Pérez de Lara became the first Mexican-born ARCA Menards Series champion.

== Truck Series ==
=== Truck No. 2 history ===
==== Nick Sanchez (2023–2024) ====
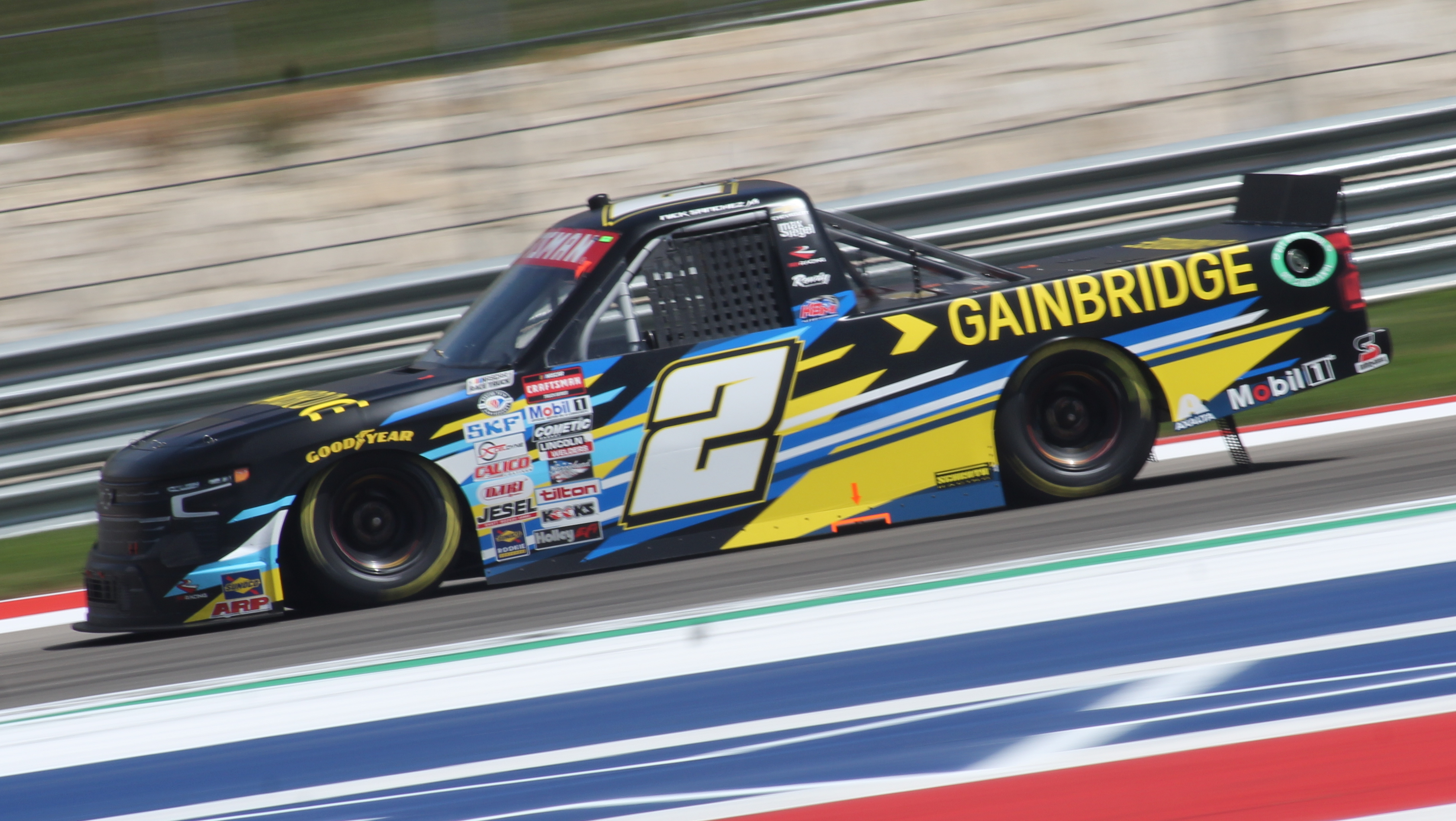
Nick Sanchez in the No. 2 at the Circuit of the Americas in 2023

On November 4, 2022, Rev Racing announced a technical alliance with Kyle Busch Motorsports and its expansion into the NASCAR Craftsman Truck Series, fielding the No. 2 Chevrolet for Sanchez in 2023. In the team's debut race, 2023 NextEra Energy 250, Sanchez earned the pole position by more than three-tenths of a second. The team scored a runner-up performance at Atlanta Motor Speedway in their third race and scored another top-ten the following week. On April 6, the No. 2 was docked ten driver and owner points for illegal modifications of the engine oil reservoir tank prior to the Texas race. Following the Talladega fall race, Sanchez got into a fight with Matt Crafton in the garage area as a result of an on-track incident when both of their trucks made contact with each other, triggering a multi-truck pileup. NASCAR fined Sanchez $5,000 and Crafton $25,000 for the fight. Sanchez was eliminated at the conclusion of the Round of 8 at Homestead.

Following the acquisition of Kyle Busch Motorsports by Spire Motorsports, Rev Racing formed a technical partnership with Spire beginning in 2024. Sanchez also returned for the 2024 season. He began the season with his first career win at Daytona. Three months later, he scored his second win at Charlotte.

In February 2024, Kyle Busch Motorsports sued Rev Racing for breach of contract. The lawsuit states that KBM was owed US$325,000 for bringing Sanchez into the Truck Series. Three months later, KBM dropped the lawsuit, indicating that both parties have reached a settlement. Three months later, Rev Racing had to pay KBM US$105,000 in judgment in the lawsuit.

On January 10, 2025, Spire Motorsports announced that they ended an agreement with Rev Racing. The truck would become the Spire Motorsports No. 07 truck.

==== Truck No. 2 results ====
Year	Driver	No.	Make	1	2	3	4	5	6	7	8	9	10	11	12	13	14	15	16	17	18	19	20	21	22	23	NCTC	Pts	Ref
2023	Nick Sanchez	2	Chevy	DAY; 26	LVS; 30	ATL; 2	COA; 7	TEX; 16*	BRD; 18	MAR; 11	KAN; 6	DAR; 11	NWS; 30	CLT; 9	GTW; 8	NSH; 3	MOH; 9	POC; 19	RCH; 8	IRP; 11	MLW; 24	KAN; 8*	BRI; 9	TAL; 7*	HOM; 17	PHO; 10	6th	2257	
2024	Nick Sanchez	2	Chevy	DAY; 1*	ATL; 5	LVS; 17	BRI; 17	COA; 18	MAR; 4	TEX; 3	KAN; 6	DAR; 2	NWS; 7	CLT; 1	GTW; 3	NSH; 13	POC; 13	IRP; 10	RCH; 30	MLW; 4	BRI; 5	KAN; 12	TAL; 22	HOM; 13	MAR; 5	PHO; 4	5th	2280	

^{*} Season still in progress

^{1} Ineligible for series points
