= Ryan Gifford =

American racing driver (born 1989)

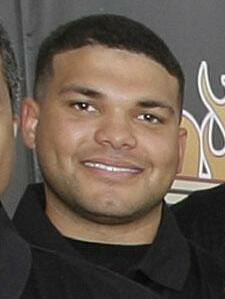
- Gifford at Richmond International Raceway in 2011
- Nationality: American
- Born: March 10, 1989 (age 37) Winchester, Tennessee, U.S.

NASCAR K&N Pro Series East career
- Debut season: 2009
- Starts: 70
- Wins: 1
- Poles: 1
- Best finish: 9th in 2010

NASCAR O'Reilly Auto Parts Series career
- 2 races run over 2 years
- 2014 position: 67th
- Best finish: 63rd (2013)
- First race: 2013 U.S. Cellular 250 (Iowa)
- Last race: 2014 Get To Know Newton 250 (Iowa)
Wins	Top tens	Poles
0	1	0
- Statistics up to date as of September 28, 2014.

Ryan Gifford (born March 10, 1989) is an American former professional stock car racing driver. A former development driver for Richard Childress Racing and a former member of NASCAR NEXT. As a NASCAR's Drive for Diversity member, he last drove the No. 2 Toyota Camry for Rev Racing in the regional K&N Pro Series East. He has made starts in the national Xfinity Series for RCR and Biagi-DenBeste Racing. Gifford is the first African-American driver to win a pole in the K&N East series and works in the shop of Team Dillon Racing.

== Early life ==
Gifford is the son of Allen Burnette and Michelle Gifford, who died in 2010. Ryan also has a half-brother, Jabryle Hill. Ryan's grandfather, Farrell Gifford, was a drag racer who introduced him to racing at age six. Gifford graduated from Franklin County High School and attended Middle Tennessee State University.

Gifford began his career in go-karts at the age of eight, competing in the World Karting Association from 2000 to 2004, winning two track championships, and finishing third in national standings in his final season. In 2005, at age 15, he transitioned to stock car racing in dirt late models, earning three poles and four top-fives in his first season. In 2006, Mike Dillon, the son-in-law of Richard Childress and RCR's general manager, noticed Gifford. Gifford would move into the Dillon's North Carolina household in 2008 to compete for RCR and Team Dillon Racing on dirt and asphalt, registering three wins and 20 top-tens in 29 starts that season. In 2009, Gifford made four starts in the K&N Pro Series East and one in the West Series in a No. 29 Shell/Pennzoil Chevrolet for RCR. Gifford scored four top-fives, including two second-place finishes.

== K&N Pro Series East ==
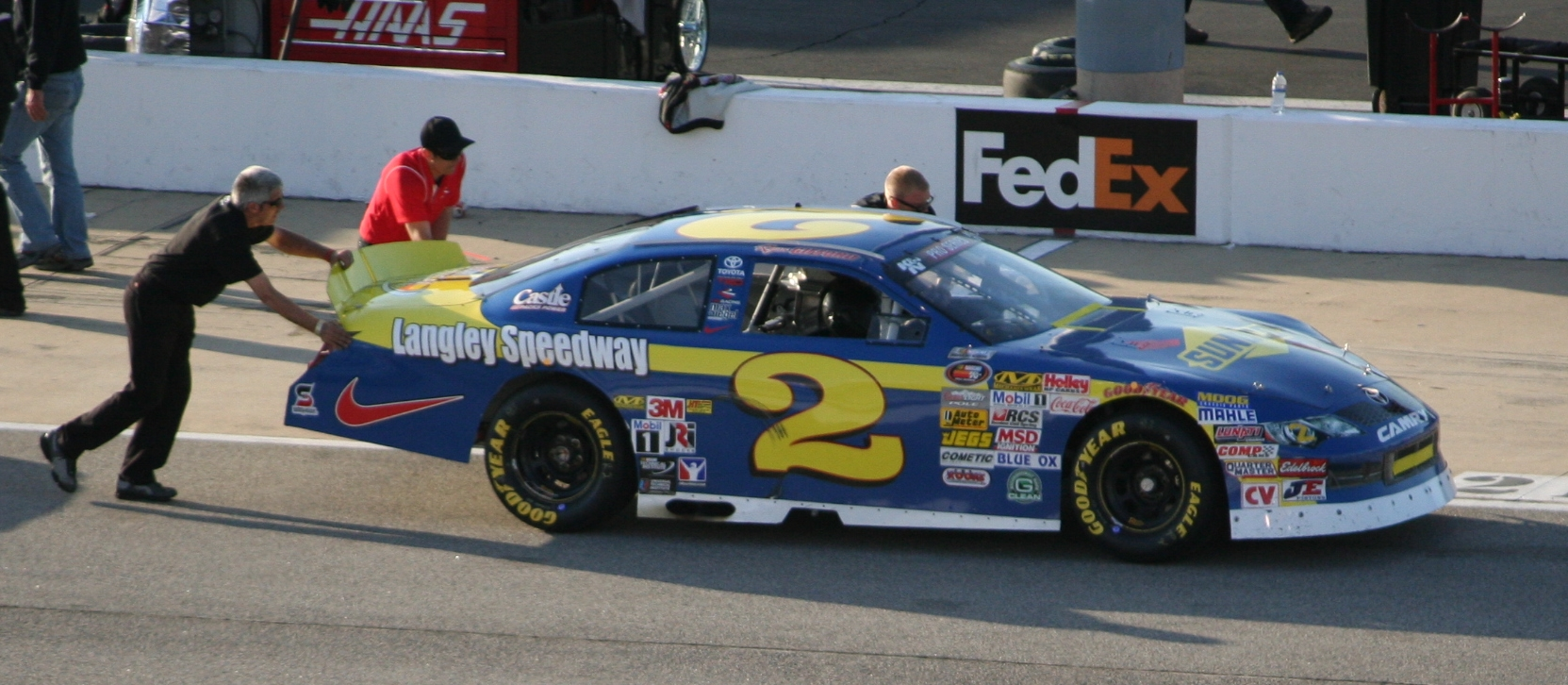
Gifford's winning car at Richmond in 2013.

In 2010, Gifford was among eleven young drivers selected for NASCAR's recently revamped Drive for Diversity program and piloting the No. 2 Chevrolet in the K&N Pro Series East. Gifford raced alongside future national series drivers Bubba Wallace and Paulie Harraka. Gifford earned four top-fives in the ten-race schedule, finishing ninth in points. Gifford also won a pole at Martinsville Speedway, the first pole by an African American in the series' history. Gifford returned in 2011 and 2012, posting seven top-tens in 26 races and finishing tenth and 11th in points, respectively.

In 2013, Gifford was named part of the NASCAR NEXT program. Gifford was joined by a new crew chief, veteran race car driver Mark Green. He won his first race, the Blue Ox 100, on April 27 at Richmond International Raceway. Gifford started 11th and worked his way to the front, beating Brandon Gdovic and Cole Custer on a late-race restart. Gifford would finish 11th in points with four top-fives and six top-tens.

After the Loudon, New Hampshire race in July 2014, Gifford was fined $1,000 for an altercation with another driver. Gifford was also placed on probation for the rest of the year.

== NASCAR Nationwide Series ==
In August 2013, Gifford made his national series debut at Iowa Speedway for Richard Childress Racing in their No. 33 Menards Chevrolet, coming from the 23rd starting position to finish ninth. In 2014, Gifford was signed to run two races for Biagi–DenBeste Racing at Iowa in May and Kentucky in June. Gifford finished 20th in his only appearance at Iowa.

== Motorsports career results ==
=== NASCAR ===
(key) (Bold – Pole position awarded by qualifying time. Italics – Pole position earned by points standings or practice time. * – Most laps led.)

==== Nationwide Series ====
NASCAR Nationwide Series results
Year	Team	No.	Make	1	2	3	4	5	6	7	8	9	10	11	12	13	14	15	16	17	18	19	20	21	22	23	24	25	26	27	28	29	30	31	32	33	NNSC	Pts	Ref
2013	Richard Childress Racing	33	Chevy	DAY	PHO	LVS	BRI	CAL	TEX	RCH	TAL	DAR	CLT	DOV	IOW	MCH	ROA	KEN	DAY	NHA	CHI	IND	IOW; 9	GLN	MOH	BRI	ATL	RCH	CHI	KEN	DOV	KAN	CLT	TEX	PHO	HOM	63rd	35	
2014	Biagi–DenBeste Racing	98	Ford	DAY	PHO	LVS	BRI	CAL	TEX	DAR	RCH	TAL	IOW; 20	CLT	DOV	MCH	ROA	KEN	DAY	NHA	CHI	IND	IOW	GLN	MOH	BRI	ATL	RCH	CHI	KEN	DOV	KAN	CLT	TEX	PHO	HOM	67th	24	

==== K&N Pro Series East ====
NASCAR K&N Pro Series East results
Year	Team	No.	Make	1	2	3	4	5	6	7	8	9	10	11	12	13	14	15	16	NKNPSEC	Pts	Ref
2009	Richard Childress Racing	29	Chevy	GRE	TRI; 17	IOW	SBO; 2	GLN	NHA; 4	TMP	ADI	LRP	NHA	DOV; 2						19th	617	
2010	Rev Racing	2	Chevy	GRE; 4	SBO; 4	IOW; 16	**MAR**; 12*	NHA; 4	LRP; 22	LEE; 19	JFC; 3	NHA; 28	DOV; 19							9th	1290	
2011	Rev Racing	2	Toyota	GRE; 13	SBO; 5	RCH; 31		BGS; 10	JFC; 12	LGY; 23	NHA; 12	COL; 14	GRE; 11	NHA; 19	DOV; 7					10th	1509	
2011	Rev Racing	02	Toyota				IOW; 4													10th	1509	
2012	Rev Racing	2	Toyota	BRI; 3	GRE; 13	RCH; 21	IOW; 17	BGS; 18	JFC; 28	LGY; 18	CNB; 4	COL; 13	IOW; 23	NHA; 12	DOV; 15	GRE; 12	CAR; 7			11th	413	
2013	Rev Racing	2	Toyota	BRI; 3	GRE; 13	FIF; 9	RCH; 1	BGS; 15	IOW; 21	LGY; 5	COL; 4	IOW; 6	VIR; 21	GRE; 19	NHA; 25	DOV; 28	RAL; 22			11th	429	
2014	Rev Racing	2	Toyota	NSM; 23	DAY; 20	BRI; 34	GRE; 6	RCH; 22	IOW; 15	BGS; 7	FIF; 18	LGY; 21	NHA; 26		IOW; 27	GLN; 23	VIR; 9	GRE; 8	DOV; 9	15th	431	
2014	Rev Racing	6	Toyota											COL; 5						15th	431	

==== Camping World West Series ====
NASCAR Camping World West Series results
Year	Team	No.	Make	1	2	3	4	5	6	7	8	9	10	11	12	13	NCWWSC	Pts	Ref
2009	Richard Childress Racing	29	Chevy	CTS	AAS	PHO	MAD	IOW	DCS	SON	IRW	PIR	MMP	CNS	IOW; 6	AAS	51st	150	
