= Terance Mathis =

American football player (born 1967)

Personal information
- Born: June 7, 1967 (age 59); Detroit, Michigan, U.S.
- Listed height: 5 ft 10 in (1.78 m)
- Listed weight: 185 lb (84 kg)

Career information
- High school: Redan (Redan, Georgia)
- College: New Mexico
- NFL draft: 1990: 6th round, 140th overall pick

Career history

Playing
- New York Jets (1990–1993); Atlanta Falcons (1994–2001); Pittsburgh Steelers (2002)

Coaching
- Savannah State (2011–2012) Offensive coordinator & inside wide receivers coach; Pinecrest Academy (GA) (2017–2019) Head coach; Blessed Trinity HS (GA) (2020) Assistant coach; Fellowship Christian (GA) (2021) Assistant coach; Morehouse (2024–2025) Head coach; Athens Christian School (2026-Present) Head coach

Awards and highlights
- Second-team All-Pro (1994); Pro Bowl (1994); Consensus All-American (1989); Third-team All-American (1987); First-team All-WAC (1989)

Career NFL statistics
- Receptions: 689
- Receiving yards: 8,809
- Receiving touchdowns: 63
- Stats at Pro Football Reference

Head coaching record
- Career: College: 4–16 (.200)
- College Football Hall of Fame

Terance Paul Mathis (born June 7, 1967) is an American college football coach and former player. He was most recently the head football coach for Morehouse College, a position he has held since 2024. Mathis played professionally as a wide receiver in the National Football League (NFL), earning second-team All-Pro honors and a Pro Bowl selection with the Atlanta Falcons in 1994.

He played college football for the New Mexico Lobos, earning consensus All-American honors in 1989. Selected in the 1990 NFL draft by the New York Jets, Mathis played the majority of his career with Atlanta. He last played in the NFL in 2002 with the Pittsburgh Steelers, then retired after the conclusion of the 2002 season. Currently, he is second in career two-point conversions with six, behind Marshall Faulk's seven.

On February 1, 2011, Mathis was named as the offensive coordinator at Savannah State University.

On May 3, 2017, Mathis was named as the head coach at Pinecrest Academy football team in Cumming, Georgia.

== Family ==
Mathis grew up as the son of Carole Mahone, his father died when he was six months old. His mother is also a breast cancer survivor, having beaten the disease two months before Mathis played in Super Bowl XXXIII. He and his wife Arnedia have a daughter named Terae and a son Terance Jr. Terance also has three other children Sydney, Erik, and Vanessa who just appeared in the Cherish music video "Unappreciated".

== High School & College ==
Mathis attended Redan High School in Stone Mountain, GA, and University of New Mexico, where he played both football and basketball. In 1989, he became New Mexico's first consensus All-American after setting a Division I record for most receiving yards. He also became the first player to have more than 250 receptions, 4,000 receiving yards, and 6,000 yards total.

== NFL ==
Pre-draft measurables
Height	Weight	Arm length	Hand span	40-yard dash	10-yard split	20-yard split	20-yard shuttle	Vertical jump
5 ft 9 1/4 in (1.76 m)	167 lb (76 kg)	30 3/8 in (0.77 m)	8 1/4 in (0.21 m)	4.65 s	1.59 s	2.76 s	4.29 s	30.5 in (0.77 m)

After Mathis was drafted by the Jets in the sixth round of the 1990 NFL Draft, he was used as a punt and kick returner. He had 43 kickoff returns for 787 yards, including one touchdown. He also had 19 receptions for 245 yards that season. The following year, he played in all sixteen games for the Jets, starting one. He had 28 receptions for 329 yards and one touchdown. He led the team in kickoff returns, piling up 599 yards. Mathis played with the Jets until 1994, starting two more games and scoring four touchdowns total.

In 1994, Mathis signed as an unrestricted free agent with the Atlanta Falcons. That season, he set a club record by catching 111 passes, becoming the eighth player in the history of the NFL to exceed the 100-catch mark in one season. He also ranked in third in the NFL that season in touchdown receptions. He played on the NFC Pro Bowl squad at the end of the season. He had his second consecutive 1000-yard season the following year despite missing the only two games of his career due to an injury. In 1996, Mathis caught for 771 yards to give him a career total of 3,000 yards.

In 1998, Mathis made his first post-season appearance for the Falcons, and made a three-yard touch down catch for the Falcons in Super Bowl XXXIII. He also led the team in receptions in that game, making seven for eighty-five yards. The following season, he passed Andre Rison as the club's all-time reception leader. Two years later, he passed Rison on the team's all-time touchdown list. After the season, he was released from the Falcons, and signed with the Pittsburgh Steelers. He did not start a game, but had two touchdown receptions and 218 receiving yards. After Pittsburgh chose not to re-sign him, he retired from the NFL.

He is third in Falcons history in touchdown receptions (57), after runner-up Julio Jones (60; 2011–2020), and first place Roddy White (63; 2005–2015); and third in receiving yards (7,349), behind runner-up White (10,863), and first place Jones (12,896).

== Charity ==
Mathis was selected as the Atlanta Falcons' "Man of the Year" in 1998 for his accomplishments on and off the field. In 1996, he founded the "Terance Loves Children" foundation, now known as the Terance Mathis Foundation.

== NASCAR ==
In June 2005, Mathis announced the formation of his own NASCAR team, Victory Motorsports, with Carl Long and Morty Buckles as scheduled drivers. Established Cup team Morgan-McClure Motorsports (which received support and engines from Hendrick Motorsports) would provide technical support for the new No. 04 Chevrolet. Mathis and the 34-year-old Buckles ambitiously planned 20 Cup races and a dozen ARCA races for 2006, but the deal never fully materialized. In June 2006, it had been announced Mathis had acquired R&J Racing, but that deal fell through. In February 2013, he was named Vice President of Marketing for part-time Sprint Cup Series team Leavine Family Racing.

== Coaching career ==
In 2011, Mathis was named as the offensive coordinator and inside receivers coach for Savannah State University.

In 2017, Mathis was named head football coach for Pinecrest Academy, he was not retained following the 2019 season.

On February 2, 2024, Mathis was named head football coach for Morehouse College.

== NFL career statistics ==
=== Regular season ===
Year	Team	Games		Receiving				
Year	Team	GP	GS	Rec	Yds	Avg	Lng	TD
1990	NYJ	16	1	19	245	12.9	23	0
1991	NYJ	16	1	28	329	11.8	39	1
1992	NYJ	16	1	22	316	14.4	55	3
1993	NYJ	16	3	24	352	14.7	46	0
1994	ATL	16	16	111	1,342	12.1	81	11
1995	ATL	14	12	78	1,039	13.3	54	9
1996	ATL	16	16	69	771	11.2	55	7
1997	ATL	16	16	62	802	12.9	49	6
1998	ATL	16	16	64	1,136	17.8	78	11
1999	ATL	16	16	81	1,016	12.5	52	6
2000	ATL	16	16	57	679	11.9	44	5
2001	ATL	16	16	51	564	11.1	34	2
2002	PIT	16	0	23	218	9.5	22	2
Career		206	130	689	8,809	12.8	81	63

== Head coaching record ==
=== College ===
Year	Team	Overall	Conference	Standing	Bowl/playoffs
Morehouse Maroon Tigers (Southern Intercollegiate Athletic Conference) (2024–2025)
2024	Morehouse	1–9	1–7	T–11th	
2025	Morehouse	3–7	3–5	T–7th	
Morehouse:		4–16	4–12		
Total:		4–16			

=== High school ===
Year	Team	Overall	Conference	Standing	Bowl/playoffs
Pinecrest Academy Paladins () (2017–2019)
2017	Pinecrest Academy	1–10	0–7	8th	
2018	Pinecrest Academy	4–7	3–4	5th	
2019	Pinecrest Academy	2–8	1–6	7th	
Pinecrest Academy:		7–25	4–17		
Athens Christian Eagles () (2026–present)
2026	Athens Christian	7-3	4-1	T-1	
Athens Christian:		7-3	4-1		
Total:		14-28			
