= Mackena Bell =

American stock car racing driver

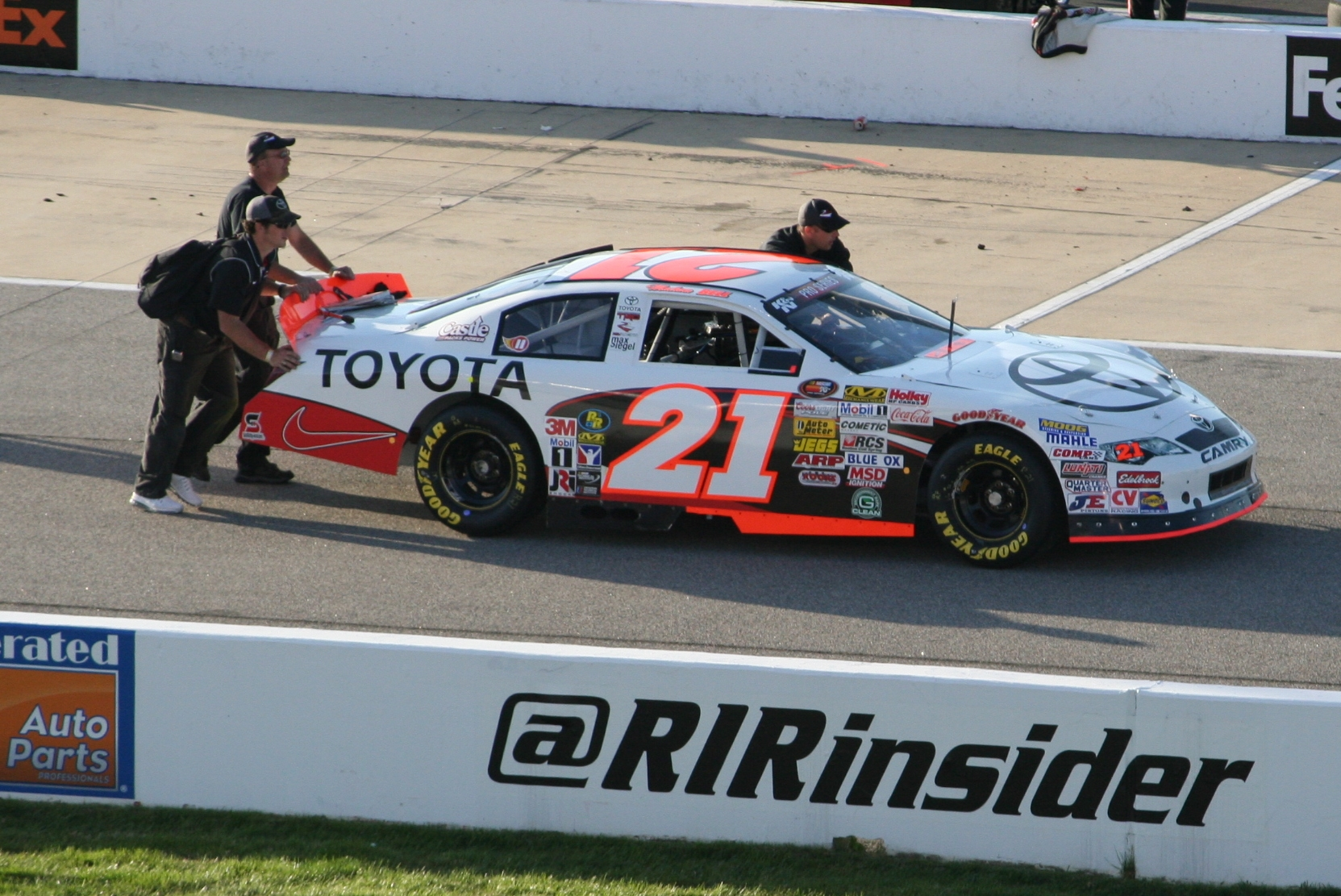
- Bell's 2013 K&N East car at Richmond International Raceway
- Born: June 9, 1990 (age 36); Carson City, Nevada, U.S.

NASCAR O'Reilly Auto Parts Series career
- 1 race run over 1 year
- 2014 position: 69th
- Best finish: 69th (2014)
- First race: 2014 DAV 200 (Phoenix)
Wins	Top tens	Poles
0	0	0
- Statistics up to date as of November 8, 2014.

Mackena Bell (born June 9, 1990) is an American former professional stock car racing driver. She drove the No. 23 Rick Ware Racing Chevrolet for one race in the NASCAR Nationwide Series in 2014. She was also a graduate of NASCAR Drive for Diversity.

== Racing career ==
=== Early years ===
Bell started racing go-karts at age five, moved up to Legend cars at age fourteen, and started racing late models at eighteen.

=== K&N Pro Series East ===
As part of the Drive for Diversity program in NASCAR, Bell competed in six races in 2010, failing to finish four and recording a best finish of eighteenth, at Martinsville Speedway. In 2013, running the whole season for Max Siegel, she recorded two top-five finishes and failed to finish only two of the fourteen races. In 2014, she crashed out of two races and recorded only one top-ten finish. She did not return to the series in 2015.

=== Nationwide Series ===
Bell made her only Nationwide Series start at the end of 2014 at Phoenix International Raceway. Driving for Rick Ware Racing, she started 39th and finished 29th, eight laps down.

== Personal life ==
Bell attended Carson High School in Carson City, Nevada, where she was the prom queen.

== Motorsports career results ==
=== NASCAR ===
(key) (Bold – Pole position awarded by qualifying time. Italics – Pole position earned by points standings or practice time. * – Most laps led.)

==== Nationwide Series ====
NASCAR Nationwide Series results
Year	Team	No.	Make	1	2	3	4	5	6	7	8	9	10	11	12	13	14	15	16	17	18	19	20	21	22	23	24	25	26	27	28	29	30	31	32	33	NNSC	Pts	Ref
2014	Rick Ware Racing	23	Chevy	DAY	PHO	LVS	BRI	CAL	TEX	DAR	RCH	TAL	IOW	CLT	DOV	MCH	ROA	KEN	DAY	NHA	CHI	IND	IOW	GLN	MOH	BRI	ATL	RCH	CHI	KEN	DOV	KAN	CLT	TEX	PHO; 29	HOM	69th	15	

==== K&N Pro Series East ====
NASCAR K&N Pro Series East results
Year	Team	No.	Make	1	2	3	4	5	6	7	8	9	10	11	12	13	14	15	16	NKNPSEC	Pts	Ref
2010	Revolution Racing	8	Chevy	GRE; 19	SBO; 23	IOW; 21	MAR; 18	NHA; 27	LRP; 28	LEE	JFC	NHA	DOV							23rd	570	
2013	Rev Racing	21	Toyota	BRI; 29	GRE; 18	FIF; 11	RCH; 5	BGS; 6		LGY; 11	COL; 11		VIR; 17	GRE; 5	NHA; 9	DOV; 19	RAL; 25			13th	419	
2013	Rev Racing	27	Toyota						IOW; 16			IOW; 15								13th	419	
2014	Rev Racing	21	Toyota	NSM; 8	DAY; 17	BRI; 21	GRE; 21	RCH; 15	IOW; 19	BGS; 13	FIF; 12	LGY; 13	NHA; 27	COL; 22	IOW; 19	GLN; 13	VIR; 21	GRE; 16	DOV; 17	16th	430	
