= Devon Amos =

American racing driver

- Born: April 11, 1991 (age 35); Rio Rancho, New Mexico, U.S.

ARCA Menards Series East career
- 14 races run over 1 year
- Best finish: 14th (2015)
- First race: 2015 Hart to Heart Breast Cancer Foundation 150 (New Smyrna)
- Last race: 2015 Drive Sober 125 (Dover)
Wins	Top tens	Poles
0	1	0
- Statistics up to date as of November 23, 2024.

Devon Amos (born April 11, 1991) is an American professional stock car racing driver who has competed in the NASCAR K&N Pro Series East in 2015, where he drove the No. 6 Toyota for Rev Racing. He is a former member of the Drive for Diversity.

Amos has also competed in series such as the New Mexico Motor Racing Association, the POWRi Desert Micro Series, the NOW600 Series Desert Region Series, and the Virginia Late Model Triple Crown Series.

== Motorsports results ==
=== NASCAR ===
(key) (Bold - Pole position awarded by qualifying time. Italics - Pole position earned by points standings or practice time. * – Most laps led.)

==== K&N Pro Series East ====
NASCAR K&N Pro Series East results
Year	Team	No.	Make	1	2	3	4	5	6	7	8	9	10	11	12	13	14	NKNPSEC	Pts	Ref
2015	Rev Racing	6	Toyota	NSM; 23	GRE; 19	BRI; 28		BGS; 6	LGY; 14	COL; 12	NHA; 18		GLN; 19	MOT; 13	VIR; 17	RCH; 29	DOV; 12	14th	367	
2015	Rev Racing	66	Toyota				IOW; 19					IOW; 20						14th	367	
