= Sam Belnavis =

American auto racing executive (1939–2021)

- Born: August 8, 1939; Brooklyn, New York, U.S.
- Died: July 14, 2021 (aged 81)
- Occupation: Roush Fenway Racing Driver Diversity head
- Known for: 1st African American premier series NASCAR owner to complete a full season

Samuel Francis Belnavis Sr. (August 8, 1939 – July 14, 2021) was an American executive in automobile racing. Belnavis, an African-American, was one of a handful minorities to have owned a NASCAR racing team. He was the head of Roush Fenway Racing's driver diversity program, and handled other marketing initiatives for that company.

== Education and military service ==
Samuel Francis Belnavis Sr. was born on August 8, 1939. As a child, Belnavis attended Our Lady of Victory, an all-black parochial school in Brooklyn, New York. He then attended Bishop Loughlin Memorial High School, with primarily white students, a very different experience. Belnavis subsequently attended Manhattan College in New York, graduating with a degree in accounting in 1961, later earning a Masters in Business Administration from the University of Michigan. He was in Air Force ROTC in Manhattan College, and served in the U.S. Air Force as a pilot in the 105th Tactical Fighter Wing, located at Lackland Air Force Base in Texas.

== Career ==
After leaving the Air Force, Belnavis took a management position at Sears in 1968. From there, he became a director of sports marketing for Miller Brewing. In 1981, while in that job, he signed Bobby Allison to a sponsorship contract. After working at Miller, Belnavis was hired by DiGard Racing; part of his duties were to push a program to diversify DiGard Racing with an African-American driver.

After DiGard, Belnavis took a position as senior vice-president of sports and entertainment with Saatchi & Saatchi, one of the world's largest advertising firms. In 1991 he relocated to Charlotte, North Carolina, where he founded his own advertising and marketing agency, Belnavis & Associates.

Belnavis became NASCAR's first full-time minority owner since Wendell Scott in 2003, when he fielded BelCar Motorsports' #54 U.S. National Guard Ford Motor Company entry driven by Todd Bodine. He quit BelCar Racing at the conclusion of the season, but continued to serve in lower-level NASCAR leagues through the Drive for Diversity program. It went on to field entries including Morty Buckes, Brianne Conrath, and Jesus Hernandez. Belnavis later joined Roush Racing as its director of diversity programs.

== Personal life ==
Belnavis and his wife Christine had one son, three daughters, and seven grandchildren. He died on July 14, 2021, at the age of 81.
