= US Legend Cars =

American race car constructor

US Legend Cars, formerly known as 600 Racing Inc. is an American race car constructor. The company, based in Harrisburg, North Carolina, builds all cars involved in Legends car racing. US Legend Cars holds the title of largest race car manufacturer in the world, due to their high production volume.

== History ==
US Legend Cars was launched by Charlotte Motor Speedway officials seeking a cheaper alternative to stock car racing. The target was a racing car low in purchasing price and in maintenance. The first car was unveiled in April 1992 by Charlotte Motor Speedway president Humpy Wheeler and racer Elliott Forbes-Robinson. The first legends racing cars body styles were based on the stock car modified divisions from the 1930s and 1940s.

Wheeler and Forbes-Robinson based the legends cars on a Dwarf cars racing division based in Arizona. As Wheeler was the Charlotte Motor Speedway president and Speedway Motorsports president the new company developing the cars was introduced as a subsidiary to Speedway Motorsports. For 1993 a Legends racing series on road courses was introduced in the United Kingdom.

For 1998 a new car was introduced, the Bandolero model. The car was fitted with a 570cc Briggs & Stratton Vanguard Model 35 engine. In 2011 a new car was launched, the Dirt Modified. The car is similar to a regular Legends racing car. However a slightly different body and adjusted Bilstein shocks make it handle more like a midget car. Ray Evernham helped develop the new racing car. The first track to run the dirt car series was East Lincoln Speedway in Stanley, North Carolina.

The legend car engine was updated from a Yamaha 1250 to a Yamaha FZ-09 in the spring of 2018.

== Models ==
	Legend	Bandolero	Thunder Roadster	Dirt Modified
Wheelbase	73 in (1,854 mm)	70 in (1,778 mm)	96 in (2,438 mm)	74 in (1,880 mm)
Width	60 in (1,524 mm)	47 in (1,194 mm)	61 in (1,549 mm)	69 in (1,753 mm)
Length	10.6 ft (3,231 mm)	10.9 ft (3,322 mm)	14.3 ft (4,359 mm)	10.4 ft (3,170 mm)
Weight	1,300 lb (589.7 kg)	550 lb (249.5 kg)	1,500 lb (680.4 kg)	1,000 lb (453.6 kg)
Engine	1250cc Yamaha (1992-Early 2018) Yamaha FZ-09 (Spring 2018-)	570cc Briggs & Stratton	1250cc Yamaha	1250cc Yamaha
Horsepower	132hp	30hp	200hp	140+hp
Tires	Federal Tires 595	INEX approved	880 Racing Hoosier	INEX approved

== See also ==
- Carbir Race Cars
