= Pinecrest Academy =

PreK3-12 school in Cumming

Location
- 955 Peachtree Parkway; Cumming, Georgia 30041; United States; 34°8′11″N 84°10′11″W

Information
- Type: Private, religious
- Motto: Semper Altius (Always Higher)
- Religious affiliation: Christian
- Denomination: Roman Catholic
- Established: September 8, 1993
- Status: Open
- Oversight: Legionaries of Christ
- School code: 110926
- Principal: High: Amy Bowman; Middle and Lower: Dr. Blanca Snyder
- Headmaster: Jake Rodgers
- Director of Campus Ministry: Emily Roman
- Grades: PreK3-12
- Gender: Coeducational
- Age range: 3-18
- Enrollment: 642 (2023)
- Average class size: 16
- Student to teacher ratio: 16:1
- Language: English
- Campus size: 68 acres (280,000 m^{2})
- Campus type: Suburban
- Colors: Green and Gold
- Athletics conference: GHSA
- Sports: Basketball, baseball, swimming, cheer leading, cross country, football, volleyball, soccer, lacrosse, golf, and tennis
- Mascot: Rocky the Paladin
- Team name: Paladins
- Accreditation: Southern Association of Colleges and Schools
- Tuition: Average (2024-25): $16,939
- Affiliation: Private
- Website: www.pinecrestacademy.org

Pinecrest Academy is a private Catholic school in Cumming, Georgia, United States, for students from Pre-K (3 years) through 12th grade. It is in the Archdiocese of Atlanta.

== History ==
Pinecrest Academy was established under the inspiration of the Legionaries of Christ, as an elementary school serving the northern part of Atlanta. It opened on September 8, 1993 with 29 students in a rented former school in Crabapple and moved in 1995 to the Catholic parish activity center in Dunwoody. In 1998, when enrollment had reached 153, it was accredited by the Georgia Accrediting Commission. It moved in fall 1998 to its own campus in Cumming. The high school was added in 2003, expanding the campus from 53 to 68 acres, and the first high school class graduated in 2007. The first headmaster was Dr. Brian Tierney, appointed in 1998.

== School ==
Pinecrest Academy is a Regnum Christi school and a member of the Georgia Independent Schools Association, the Atlanta Area Association of Independent Schools, the National Catholic Educational Association, and the Southern Association of Independent Schools. It has been accredited by the Southern Association of Colleges and Schools since December 31, 2001. The current Head of School is Jake Rodgers. The principal of the lower and middle schools is Dr. Blanca Plazas Snyder (since 2023) and the principal of the high school is Amy Bowman. Emily Roman is director of campus ministry.

The campus includes separate buildings for the lower, middle, and high schools, a main chapel and two additional chapels, and sports facilities including two gymnasiums, two athletic fields, and a cross country trail. There is also an outdoor Stations of the Cross.

In 2014, Pinecrest was named a National Blue Ribbon School. At that time, its enrollment was almost 800. It has been recognized by the Cardinal Newman Society as a School of Excellence since 2007. In 2020, the high school was rated the best Catholic high school in Georgia by Niche.

== Extracurricular ==
The school sports teams are the Paladins. An athletics hall of fame was inaugurated in 2016.

The high school wind symphony has been successful at the Williamsburg WorldStrides Music Festival.

== See also ==
- List of private schools in Atlanta
- National Catholic Educational Association
