= 2011 Aaron's 312 =

Race details
- Map of Speedway
- Date: April 16, 2011
- Official name: 2011 Aaron's 312
- Location: Talladega Superspeedway in Lincoln, Alabama
- Course: Tri-oval
- Course length: 2.66 miles (4.28 km)
- Distance: 124 laps, 330 mi (531.084 km)
- Scheduled distance: 117 laps, 311.2 mi (500.83 km)
- Weather: Sunny
- Average speed: 126.618 mph (203.772 km/h)
- Attendance: 65,700

Pole position
Driver	Elliott Sadler	Kevin Harvick Inc.
- Time: 53.331

Most laps led
Driver	Trevor Bayne	Roush Fenway Racing
- Laps: 23

Winner
No. 18	Kyle Busch	Joe Gibbs Racing

Television in the United States
- Network: ESPN2
- Announcers: Marty Reid, Dale Jarrett, Andy Petree

The 2011 Aaron's 312 was a NASCAR Nationwide Series race held at Talladega Superspeedway in Lincoln, Alabama on April 16, 2011. The race was the 20th iteration of the event and the 7th race of the 2011 NASCAR Nationwide Series. Elliott Sadler won the pole while Trevor Bayne led the most laps as the race saw the most lead changes in a Nationwide Series race at Talladega at 56 while also being the longest running Nationwide Series race at Talladega distance wise until 2022 which tied it. But it was Kyle Busch who would be the last lead change of the race and won the race after a big crash occurred on the final lap that saw a car flip over. It would be Busch's first win at Talladega in the Nationwide Series.

== Background ==
Talladega Superspeedway, the race track where the race was held.

The track, Talladega Superspeedway, is one of six superspeedways to hold NASCAR races, the others being Daytona International Speedway, Auto Club Speedway, Indianapolis Motor Speedway, Pocono Raceway and Michigan International Speedway. The standard track at the speedway is a four-turn superspeedway that is 2.66 miles (4.28 km) long. The track's turns are banked at thirty-three degrees, while the front stretch, the location of the finish line, is banked at 16.5 degrees. The back stretch has a two-degree banking. Talladega Superspeedway can seat up to 143,231 people.

=== Entry list ===
- (R) denotes rookie driver
- (i) denotes driver who is ineligible for series driver points

#	Driver	Team	Make
01	Mike Wallace	JD Motorsports	Chevrolet
1	Jamie McMurray (i)	Phoenix Racing	Chevrolet
2	Elliott Sadler	Kevin Harvick Inc.	Chevrolet
4	Kevin Harvick (i)	Kevin Harvick Inc.	Chevrolet
6	Ricky Stenhouse Jr.	Roush Fenway Racing	Ford
7	Dale Earnhardt Jr. (i)	JR Motorsports	Chevrolet
09	Kenny Wallace	RAB Racing	Toyota
11	Brian Scott	Joe Gibbs Racing	Toyota
12	Sam Hornish Jr.	Penske Racing	Dodge
14	Eric McClure	TriStar Motorsports	Chevrolet
15	Timmy Hill (R)	Rick Ware Racing	Ford
16	Trevor Bayne	Roush Fenway Racing	Ford
18	Kyle Busch (i)	Joe Gibbs Racing	Toyota
19	Mike Bliss	TriStar Motorsports	Chevrolet
20	Joey Logano (i)	Joe Gibbs Racing	Toyota
21	Tim George Jr.	Richard Childress Racing	Chevrolet
22	Brad Keselowski (i)	Penske Racing	Dodge
23	Robert Richardson Jr.	R3 Motorsports	Dodge
28	Derrike Cope	Jay Robinson Racing	Chevrolet
30	James Buescher (i)	Turner Motorsports	Chevrolet
31	Justin Allgaier	Turner Motorsports	Chevrolet
32	Reed Sorenson	Turner Motorsports	Chevrolet
33	Clint Bowyer (i)	Kevin Harvick Inc.	Chevrolet
38	Jason Leffler	Turner Motorsports	Chevrolet
39	Josh Wise	Go Green Racing	Ford
40	Scott Wimmer	Key Motorsports	Chevrolet
41	Jennifer Jo Cobb (R)	Rick Ware Racing	Ford
44	Jeff Green	TriStar Motorsports	Chevrolet
51	Jeremy Clements	Jeremy Clements Racing	Chevrolet
52	Danny Efland	Means Motorsports	Chevrolet
60	Carl Edwards (i)	Roush Fenway Racing	Ford
62	Michael Annett	Rusty Wallace Racing	Toyota
66	Steve Wallace	Rusty Wallace Racing	Toyota
68	Carl Long	Fleur-de-lis Motorsports	Chevrolet
70	Dennis Setzer	ML Motorsports	Dodge
74	Mike Harmon	Mike Harmon Racing	Chevrolet
79	Tim Andrews	2nd Chance Motorsports	Ford
81	Donnie Neuenberger	MacDonald Motorsports	Dodge
82	Blake Koch (R)	MacDonald Motorsports	Dodge
87	Joe Nemechek	NEMCO Motorsports	Toyota
88	Aric Almirola	JR Motorsports	Chevrolet
89	Morgan Shepherd	Faith Motorsports	Chevrolet
99	Michael Waltrip (i)	Pastrana-Waltrip Racing	Toyota
Official Entry list

== Qualifying ==
Elliott Sadler won the pole for the race with a time of 53.331 and a speed of 179.558.

Grid	No.	Driver	Team	Manufacturer	Time	Speed
1	2	Elliott Sadler	Kevin Harvick Inc.	Chevrolet	53.331	179.558
2	33	Clint Bowyer (i)	Kevin Harvick Inc.	Chevrolet	53.386	179.373
3	7	Dale Earnhardt Jr. (i)	JR Motorsports	Chevrolet	53.463	179.115
4	1	Jamie McMurray (i)	Phoenix Racing	Chevrolet	53.629	178.560
5	16	Trevor Bayne	Roush Fenway Racing	Ford	53.669	178.427
6	60	Carl Edwards (i)	Roush Fenway Racing	Ford	53.708	178.297
7	20	Joey Logano (i)	Joe Gibbs Racing	Toyota	53.771	178.089
8	62	Michael Annett	Rusty Wallace Racing	Toyota	53.780	178.059
9	38	Jason Leffler	Turner Motorsports	Chevrolet	53.785	178.042
10	88	Aric Almirola	JR Motorsports	Chevrolet	53.786	178.039
11	4	Kevin Harvick (i)	Kevin Harvick Inc.	Chevrolet	53.786	178.039
12	12	Sam Hornish Jr.	Penske Racing	Dodge	53.792	178.019
13	32	Reed Sorenson	Turner Motorsports	Chevrolet	53.793	178.016
14	6	Ricky Stenhouse Jr.	Roush Fenway Racing	Ford	53.794	178.012
15	30	James Buescher (i)	Turner Motorsports	Chevrolet	53.833	177.883
16	22	Brad Keselowski (i)	Penske Racing	Dodge	53.874	177.748
17	31	Justin Allgaier	Turner Motorsports	Chevrolet	53.875	177.745
18	66	Steve Wallace	Rusty Wallace Racing	Toyota	53.910	177.629
19	09	Kenny Wallace	RAB Racing	Toyota	54.003	177.323
20	87	Joe Nemechek	NEMCO Motorsports	Toyota	54.114	176.960
21	21	Tim George Jr.	Richard Childress Racing	Chevrolet	54.154	176.829
22	18	Kyle Busch (i)	Joe Gibbs Racing	Toyota	54.155	176.826
23	11	Brian Scott	Joe Gibbs Racing	Toyota	54.164	176.796
24	99	Michael Waltrip (i)	Pastrana-Waltrip Racing	Toyota	54.322	176.282
25	14	Eric McClure	TriStar Motorsports	Chevrolet	54.334	176.243
26	23	Robert Richardson Jr.	R3 Motorsports	Dodge	54.697	175.074
27	01	Mike Wallace	JD Motorsports	Chevrolet	54.711	175.029
28	74	Mike Harmon	Mike Harmon Racing	Chevrolet	54.731	174.965
29	19	Mike Bliss	TriStar Motorsports	Chevrolet	54.784	174.796
30	44	Jeff Green	TriStar Motorsports	Chevrolet	54.933	174.321
31	81	Donnie Neuenberger	MacDonald Motorsports	Dodge	55.032	174.008
32	82	Blake Koch (R)	MacDonald Motorsports	Dodge	55.094	173.812
33	41	Jennifer Jo Cobb (R)	Rick Ware Racing	Ford	55.140	173.667
34	15	Timmy Hill (R)	Rick Ware Racing	Ford	55.211	173.444
35	40	Scott Wimmer*	Key Motorsports	Chevrolet	55.211	173.444
36	52	Danny Efland	Means Motorsports	Chevrolet	55.239	173.356
37	68	Carl Long	Fleur-de-lis Motorsports	Chevrolet	55.260	173.290
38	28	Derrike Cope	Jay Robinson Racing	Chevrolet	55.313	173.124
39	39	Josh Wise	Go Green Racing	Ford	55.318	173.108
40	89	Morgan Shepherd	Faith Motorsports	Chevrolet	55.324	173.089
41	51	Jeremy Clements	Jeremy Clements Racing	Chevrolet	55.491	172.569
42	79	Tim Andrews*	2nd Chance Motorsports	Ford	55.654	172.063
43	70	Dennis Setzer*	ML Motorsports	Dodge	56.234	170.288
Official Starting grid

* - Scott Wimmer, Tim Andrews, and Dennis Setzer all had to start at the rear of the field. Wimmer and Setzer had adjustments after impound while Andrews missed the drivers meeting.

== Race ==
At the start of the race. Drivers started to form into tandems. Outside pole sitter Clint Bowyer took the lead from pole sitter Elliott Sadler with Dale Earnhardt Jr. pushing him and Bowyer led the first lap. On lap 2, Carl Edwards took the lead with Trevor Bayne but they were passed when Aric Almirola took the lead with Kevin Harvick and Almirola led lap 2. Edwards took the lead with Bayne from Almirola on lap 3. On lap 4, Clint Bowyer took the lead. On lap 5, Aric Almirola took the lead. On lap 6, Carl Edwards took the lead. On lap 7, Kevin Harvick took the lead with Bowyer pushing him. On lap 9, Carl Edwards took the lead with Bayne but both Bayne and Edwards switched and Bayne led lap 9 before they fell back and Harvick retook the lead. On lap 12, Kyle Busch took the lead. On lap 13, Jamie McMurray took the lead. On lap 15, Brad Keselowski took the lead after McMurray and his partner Elliott Sadler switched places. On lap 16, Sadler took the lead from Keselowski. On lap 19, Clint Bowyer took the lead after the leaders had to dodge lap traffic but Ricky Stenhouse Jr. passed Bowyer and his partner Kevin Harvick on the same lap and Stenhouse led lap 19 with Sam Hornish Jr. behind him. On lap 23, the first caution flew for debris. At the same time, Kevin Harvick's engine blew and he was out of the race. Kyle Busch won the race off of pit road but he missed his pit box and had to come back to stop and Elliott Sadler was the new leader and he led the field to the restart on lap 28. On the restart, Sam Hornish Jr. took the lead with Ricky Stenhouse Jr. behind him but was passed by Dale Earnhardt Jr. on lap 29 and Junior took the lead with Aric Almirola. On that same lap, the second caution flew when Brian Scott spun in turn 3 after he got turned by Joey Logano. The race would restart on lap 33. On the restart, Jamie McMurray took the lead from Dale Earnhardt Jr. with Elliott Sadler. On lap 34, Ricky Stenhouse Jr. attempted to take the lead with Sam Hornish Jr. and led that lap but Stenhouse could not pass McMurray. On lap 36, Mike Bliss took the lead with Kyle Busch but was immeadietly passed by Reed Sorenson and Sorenson led lap 36 with Joey Logano. On lap 42, Brad Keselowski took the lead with Trevor Bayne. On lap 44, the third caution would fly when Sam Hornish Jr. spun through the tri-oval after he got turned by Ricky Stenhouse Jr. Brad Keselowski won the race off of pit road and he led the field to the restart on lap 49. On the restart, Trevor Bayne took the lead with Carl Edwards behind him. On lap 53, Jamie McMurray took the lead with Elliott Sadler. On lap 55, the fourth caution would fly when Mike Bliss spun in turns 1 and 2 after getting turned by Joey Logano. The race would restart on lap 60. On lap 61, Trevor Bayne took the lead. On that lap, Justin Allgaier tried to take the lead but couldn't get in front of Bayne. On lap 63, Jamie McMurray took the lead but Bayne took it back on the next lap. On lap 65, Kenny Wallace took the lead with Reed Sorenson. On lap 67, Jamie McMurray took the lead.

=== Final laps ===
With 49 laps to go, McMurray and his partner Elliott Sadler decided to switch spots and Sadler was the new leader. On that same lap, the 5th caution flew when Ricky Stenhouse Jr. turned across the nose of Trevor Bayne and Stenhouse hit the outside wall on the backstretch. The race would be red flagged for a few minutes after Stenhouse's car leaked oil and caught on fire. Jamie McMurray won the race off of pit road and he led the field to the restart with 43 laps to go. With 42 to go, Carl Edwards took the lead with Trevor Bayne behind him. With 41 to go, Kyle Busch took the lead with Clint Bowyer. With 40 to go, Jamie McMurray led that lap but could not get in front of Busch. But on the next lap, Trevor Bayne took the lead from Dale Earnhardt Jr., who passed Busch but did not lead the lap. With 37 to go, Dale Earnhardt Jr. took the lead. Trevor Bayne took it back with 36 to go but Junior took it back with 35 to go. With 35 to go, the 6th caution would fly when Donnie Neuenberger got spun by Mike Bliss off of turn 2. Dale Earnhardt Jr. won the race off of pit road and he led the field to the restart with 30 laps to go. But on the restart, the 7th caution would fly for the big one that occurred down the backstretch. It started when Kyle Busch got bumped too hard from behind by Clint Bowyer and started a chain reaction where Busch came up into Michael Waltrip and Waltrip spun down collecting Jamie McMurray and sent a lot of other cars scrambling to avoid and end up running into each other and wrecking. The wreck collected a total of 20 cars. The cars involved were Jamie McMurray, Brian Scott, Eric McClure, Kyle Busch, Mike Bliss, Tim George Jr., Brad Keselowski, Robert Richardson Jr., Derrike Cope, Justin Allgaier, Clint Bowyer, Josh Wise, Scott Wimmer, Jennifer Jo Cobb, Jeremy Clements, Danny Efland, Michael Annett, Steve Wallace, Blake Koch, and Michael Waltrip. The race was red flagged for a short bit to clean up the mess. The race would restart with 25 laps to go. With 24 to go, Trevor Bayne took the lead from Dale Earnhardt Jr. With 17 to go, Dale Earnhardt Jr. took the lead with Aric Almirola but were passed by Brad Keselowski and Keselowski led with 17 to go with Sam Hornish Jr. With 15 to go, Junior took the lead but Keselowski took it back on the next lap. With 13 to go, Mike Wallace took the lead with Joe Nemechek behind him. With 12 to go, Keselowski took the lead back from Wallace. With 11 to go, Dale Earnhardt Jr. took the lead but Keselowski immeadietly passed him. With 10 to go, Mike Wallace took the lead back. With 9 to go, Trevor Bayne took the lead. With 8 to go, Sam Hornish Jr. took the lead. With 7 to go, Trevor Bayne took the lead. On the same lap, the 8th caution flew when Sam Hornish Jr. spun down the backstretch after getting turned by Brad Keselowski. The race would restart with 3 laps to go. On the restart, Joe Nemechek took the lead. Nemechek was looking for his first Nationwide Series win since 2004. But on the same lap, the 9th caution would fly for a 4 car crash on the backstretch. It started when Michael Annett got hooked by Brian Scott and Annett hit the outside wall and came down and collected Scott, Joey Logano, and Reed Sorenson. The wreck would set up 3 attempts of a green-white-checkered finish. On the restart, Mike Wallace took the lead from Nemechek. Wallace was also looking for his first Busch Series win since 2004. But the 10th caution would fly on the backstretch when the Turner Motorsports cars in James Buescher, Reed Sorenson, and Jason Leffler crashed. This would mean a second attempt of a green-white-checkered. On the restart, Joe Nemechek took the lead with Brad Keselowski pushing him. Coming through the tri-oval, Trevor Bayne took the lead with Carl Edwards pushing him and took the white flag. Nemechek and Keselowski attempted to take the lead from Bayne and Edwards but they left the middle open and Kyle Busch snuck through the middle with Joey Logano and Busch took the lead. Down the backstretch, the 11th and final caution would fly for a 5 car crash. Elliott Sadler hooked Mike Wallace sending Wallace sideways up to the right where Wallace overcorrected to the left and spun where he got hit in the left front by Jason Leffler. The impact lifted Wallace's rear into the air and ended up flipping the car over while spinning nearly 270 degrees before it landed on all four wheels. The wreck also collected Reed Sorenson and Carl Edwards. Kyle Busch was in front when the Caution flew and Busch scored the victory. The win would be Busch's 4th of the 2011 season and his first at Talladega in the Nationwide Series. Joey Logano, Joe Nemechek, Brad Keselowski, and Elliott Sadler rounded out the top 5 while Trevor Bayne, Justin Allgaier, Dale Earnhardt Jr., Reed Sorenson, and Aric Almirola rounded out the top 10. The race featured 56 lead changes among 18 different drivers which is currently the most at Talladega in Nationwide Series history.

== Race results ==
Pos	Car	Driver	Team	Manufacturer	Laps Run	Laps Led	Status	Points
1	18	Kyle Busch (i)	Joe Gibbs Racing	Toyota	124	4	running	0
2	20	Joey Logano (i)	Joe Gibbs Racing	Toyota	124	0	running	0
3	87	Joe Nemechek	NEMCO Motorsports	Toyota	124	0	running	42
4	22	Brad Keselowski (i)	Penske Racing	Dodge	124	14	running	0
5	2	Elliott Sadler	Kevin Harvick Inc.	Chevrolet	124	8	running	40
6	16	Trevor Bayne	Roush Fenway Racing	Ford	124	23	running	40
7	31	Justin Allgaier	Turner Motorsports	Chevrolet	124	0	running	37
8	7	Dale Earnhardt Jr. (i)	JR Motorsports	Chevrolet	124	16	running	0
9	32	Reed Sorenson	Turner Motorsports	Chevrolet	124	6	running	36
10	88	Aric Almirola	JR Motorsports	Chevrolet	124	2	running	35
11	11	Brian Scott	Joe Gibbs Racing	Toyota	124	0	running	33
12	40	Scott Wimmer	Key Motorsports	Chevrolet	124	0	running	32
13	12	Sam Hornish Jr.	Penske Racing	Dodge	124	2	running	32
14	15	Timmy Hill (R)	Rick Ware Racing	Ford	124	0	running	30
15	38	Jason Leffler	Turner Motorsports	Chevrolet	124	0	running	29
16	82	Blake Koch (R)	MacDonald Motorsports	Dodge	124	0	running	28
17	60	Carl Edwards (i)	Roush Fenway Racing	Ford	124	3	running	0
18	01	Mike Wallace	JD Motorsports	Chevrolet	124	6	running	27
19	62	Michael Annett	Rusty Wallace Racing	Toyota	122	0	running	25
20	81	Donnie Neuenberger	MacDonald Motorsports	Dodge	121	0	running	24
21	52	Danny Efland	Means Motorsports	Chevrolet	121	0	running	23
22	33	Clint Bowyer (i)	Kevin Harvick Inc.	Chevrolet	120	2	running	0
23	30	James Buescher (i)	Turner Motorsports	Chevrolet	118	0	crash	0
24	51	Jeremy Clements	Jeremy Clements Racing	Chevrolet	110	0	running	20
25	09	Kenny Wallace	RAB Racing	Toyota	109	2	electrical	20
26	14	Eric McClure	TriStar Motorsports	Chevrolet	109	0	running	18
27	28	Derrike Cope	Jay Robinson Racing	Chevrolet	104	1	running	18
28	23	Robert Richardson Jr.	R3 Motorsports	Dodge	103	1	running	17
29	70	Dennis Setzer	ML Motorsports	Dodge	100	0	running	15
30	89	Morgan Shepherd	Faith Motorsports	Chevrolet	98	0	rear axle	14
31	39	Josh Wise	Go Green Racing	Ford	92	0	crash	13
32	66	Steve Wallace	Rusty Wallace Racing	Toyota	88	0	crash	12
33	99	Michael Waltrip (i)	Pastrana-Waltrip Racing	Toyota	87	0	crash	0
34	1	Jamie McMurray (i)	Phoenix Racing	Chevrolet	87	20	crash	0
35	19	Mike Bliss	TriStar Motorsports	Chevrolet	87	0	crash	9
36	21	Tim George Jr.	Richard Childress Racing	Chevrolet	87	0	crash	8
37	41	Jennifer Jo Cobb (R)	Rick Ware Racing	Ford	87	0	crash	7
38	6	Ricky Stenhouse Jr.	Roush Fenway Racing	Ford	68	6	crash	7
39	4	Kevin Harvick (i)	Kevin Harvick Inc.	Chevrolet	21	4	engine	0
40	74	Mike Harmon	Mike Harmon Racing	Chevrolet	11	0	ignition	4
41	79	Tim Andrews	2nd Chance Motorsports	Ford	4	0	rear end	3
42	68	Carl Long	Fleur-de-lis Motorsports	Chevrolet	2	0	electrical	2
43	44	Jeff Green	TriStar Motorsports	Chevrolet	1	0	vibration	1
Official Race results

Previous race: 2011 O'Reilly Auto Parts 300	NASCAR Nationwide Series; 2011 season	Next race: 2011 Nashville 300
