= 2011 DRIVE4COPD 300 =

Race details
- Map of Speedway
- Date: February 19, 2011
- Official name: 2011 DRIVE4COPD 300
- Location: Daytona International Speedway in Daytona Beach, Florida
- Course: Tri-oval
- Course length: 2.5 miles (4.023 km)
- Distance: 120 laps, 300 mi (400 km)
- Weather: Sunny
- Average speed: 139.679 mph (224.792 km/h)
- Attendance: 82,000

Pole position
| Driver | Clint Bowyer | Kevin Harvick Inc. |
- Time: 49.773

Most laps led
| Driver | Clint Bowyer | Kevin Harvick Inc. |
- Laps: 40

Winner
| No. 4 | Tony Stewart | Kevin Harvick Inc. |

Television in the United States
- Network: ESPN2
- Announcers: Marty Reid, Dale Jarrett, Andy Petree

The 2011 DRIVE4COPD 300 was a NASCAR Nationwide Series race held at Daytona International Speedway in Daytona Beach, Florida. It was the first race of the 2011 NASCAR Nationwide Series season. It was the 30th running of the event. Clint Bowyer won the pole and led the most laps of the race but it was Tony Stewart who beat his Kevin Harvick Inc. teammate to win his 4th Nationwide Series opener in a row and his 6th in the last 7 Nationwide Series openers by 0.007 seconds in one of the closest NASCAR finishes ever.

== Entry list ==
- (R) denotes rookie driver
- (i) denotes driver who is ineligible for series driver points

| # | Driver | Team | Make |
|---|---|---|---|
| 01 | Mike Wallace | JD Motorsports | Chevrolet |
| 1 | Landon Cassill | Phoenix Racing | Chevrolet |
| 2 | Elliott Sadler | Kevin Harvick Inc. | Chevrolet |
| 4 | Tony Stewart (i) | Kevin Harvick Inc. | Chevrolet |
| 05 | David Starr (i) | Day Enterprises Motorsports | Chevrolet |
| 5 | Dale Earnhardt Jr. (i) | JR Motorsports | Chevrolet |
| 6 | Ricky Stenhouse Jr. | Roush Fenway Racing | Ford |
| 7 | Danica Patrick | JR Motorsports | Chevrolet |
| 09 | Kenny Wallace | RAB Racing | Toyota |
| 11 | Brian Scott | Joe Gibbs Racing | Toyota |
| 12 | Sam Hornish Jr. | Penske Racing | Dodge |
| 14 | Eric McClure | TriStar Motorsports | Chevrolet |
| 15 | Todd Bodine* (i) | Germain Racing | Toyota |
| 16 | Trevor Bayne | Roush Fenway Racing | Ford |
| 18 | Kyle Busch (i) | Joe Gibbs Racing | Toyota |
| 19 | Mike Bliss | TriStar Motorsports | Chevrolet |
| 20 | Joey Logano (i) | Joe Gibbs Racing | Toyota |
| 22 | Brad Keselowski (i) | Penske Racing | Dodge |
| 23 | Robert Richardson Jr. | R3 Motorsports | Dodge |
| 24 | Kevin Lepage | Team Rensi Motorsports | Ford |
| 25 | Kelly Bires | Team Rensi Motorsports | Ford |
| 27 | J. R. Fitzpatrick | Baker Curb Racing | Ford |
| 28 | Derrike Cope | Jay Robinson Racing | Chevrolet |
| 30 | Jason Leffler | Turner Motorsports | Chevrolet |
| 31 | Justin Allgaier | Turner Motorsports | Chevrolet |
| 32 | Reed Sorenson | Turner Motorsports | Chevrolet |
| 33 | Clint Bowyer (i) | Kevin Harvick Inc. | Chevrolet |
| 38 | Kasey Kahne (i) | Turner Motorsports | Chevrolet |
| 39 | Josh Wise | Go Green Racing | Ford |
| 40 | Scott Wimmer | Key Motorsports | Chevrolet |
| 41 | Patrick Sheltra | Rick Ware Racing | Ford |
| 44 | Jeff Green | TriStar Motorsports | Chevrolet |
| 51 | Jeremy Clements | Jeremy Clements Racing | Chevrolet |
| 52 | Bobby Santos III | Means Motorsports | Chevrolet |
| 55 | Brett Rowe | Faith Motorsports | Chevrolet |
| 60 | Carl Edwards (i) | Roush Fenway Racing | Ford |
| 62 | Michael Annett | Rusty Wallace Racing | Toyota |
| 66 | Steve Wallace | Rusty Wallace Racing | Toyota |
| 70 | Shelby Howard | ML Motorsports | Chevrolet |
| 79 | Jennifer Jo Cobb (R) | 2nd Chance Motorsports | Ford |
| 81 | Donnie Neuenberger | MacDonald Motorsports | Dodge |
| 87 | Joe Nemechek | NEMCO Motorsports | Toyota |
| 88 | Aric Almirola | JR Motorsports | Chevrolet |
| 89 | Morgan Shepherd | Faith Motorsports | Chevrolet |
| 99 | Michael Waltrip (i) | Pastrana-Waltrip Racing | Toyota |
Official Entry List

* – Brendan Gaughan was supposed to run the #15 for this event but was taken out for unknown reasons.

== Qualifying ==
Clint Bowyer won the pole with a time of 49.773 and a speed of 180.821.

| Grid | No. | Driver | Team | Manufacturer | Time | Speed |
|---|---|---|---|---|---|---|
| 1 | 33 | Clint Bowyer (i) | Kevin Harvick Inc. | Chevrolet | 49.773 | 180.821 |
| 2 | 1 | Landon Cassill | Phoenix Racing | Chevrolet | 49.834 | 180.600 |
| 3 | 5 | Dale Earnhardt Jr. (i) | JR Motorsports | Chevrolet | 49.836 | 180.592 |
| 4 | 7 | Danica Patrick | JR Motorsports | Chevrolet | 49.867 | 180.480 |
| 5 | 31 | Justin Allgaier | Turner Motorsports | Chevrolet | 49.874 | 180.455 |
| 6 | 20 | Joey Logano (i) | Joe Gibbs Racing | Toyota | 49.995 | 180.018 |
| 7 | 16 | Trevor Bayne | Roush Fenway Racing | Ford | 50.024 | 179.914 |
| 8 | 18 | Kyle Busch (i) | Joe Gibbs Racing | Toyota | 50.039 | 179.860 |
| 9 | 60 | Carl Edwards (i) | Roush Fenway Racing | Ford | 50.071 | 179.745 |
| 10 | 6 | Ricky Stenhouse Jr. | Roush Fenway Racing | Ford | 50.091 | 179.673 |
| 11 | 11 | Brian Scott | Joe Gibbs Racing | Toyota | 50.094 | 179.662 |
| 12 | 22 | Brad Keselowski (i) | Penske Racing | Dodge | 50.097 | 179.651 |
| 13 | 62 | Michael Annett | Rusty Wallace Racing | Toyota | 50.164 | 179.412 |
| 14 | 4 | Tony Stewart (i) | Kevin Harvick Inc. | Chevrolet | 50.176 | 179.369 |
| 15 | 88 | Aric Almirola | JR Motorsports | Chevrolet | 50.190 | 179.319 |
| 16 | 32 | Reed Sorenson** | Turner Motorsports | Chevrolet | 50.209 | 179.251 |
| 17 | 12 | Sam Hornish Jr. | Penske Racing | Dodge | 50.215 | 179.229 |
| 18 | 87 | Joe Nemechek | NEMCO Motorsports | Toyota | 50.234 | 179.162 |
| 19 | 2 | Elliott Sadler | Kevin Harvick Inc. | Chevrolet | 50.272 | 179.026 |
| 20 | 38 | Kasey Kahne (i) | Turner Motorsports | Chevrolet | 50.306 | 178.905 |
| 21 | 66 | Steve Wallace | Rusty Wallace Racing | Toyota | 50.315 | 178.873 |
| 22 | 30 | Jason Leffler | Turner Motorsports | Chevrolet | 50.415 | 178.518 |
| 23 | 52 | Bobby Santos III | Means Motorsports | Chevrolet | 50.501 | 178.214 |
| 24 | 70 | Shelby Howard | ML Motorsports | Chevrolet | 50.505 | 178.200 |
| 25 | 09 | Kenny Wallace | RAB Racing | Toyota | 50.510 | 178.183 |
| 26 | 99 | Michael Waltrip (i) | Pastrana-Waltrip Racing | Toyota | 50.512 | 178.175 |
| 27 | 01 | Mike Wallace | JD Motorsports | Chevrolet | 50.608 | 177.837 |
| 28 | 44 | Jeff Green | TriStar Motorsports | Chevrolet | 50.668 | 177.627 |
| 29 | 51 | Jeremy Clements | Jeremy Clements Racing | Chevrolet | 50.704 | 177.501 |
| 30 | 19 | Mike Bliss | TriStar Motorsports | Chevrolet | 50.719 | 177.448 |
| 31 | 39 | Josh Wise | Go Green Racing | Ford | 50.747 | 177.350 |
| 32 | 25 | Kelly Bires | Team Rensi Motorsports | Ford | 50.771 | 177.267 |
| 33 | 81 | Donnie Neuenberger | MacDonald Motorsports | Dodge | 50.781 | 177.232 |
| 34 | 14 | Eric McClure | TriStar Motorsports | Chevrolet | 50.798 | 177.172 |
| 35 | 41 | Patrick Sheltra | Rick Ware Racing | Ford | 50.873 | 176.911 |
| 36 | 15 | Todd Bodine (i) | Germain Racing | Toyota | 50.905 | 176.800 |
| 37 | 24 | Kevin Lepage | Team Rensi Motorsports | Ford | 50.932 | 176.706 |
| 38 | 23 | Robert Richardson Jr. | R3 Motorsports | Dodge | 51.064 | 176.249 |
| 39 | 89 | Morgan Shepherd | Faith Motorsports | Chevrolet | 51.118 | 176.063 |
| 40 | 27 | J. R. Fitzpatrick | Baker Curb Racing | Ford | 51.427 | 175.005 |
| 41 | 28 | Derrike Cope* | Jay Robinson Racing | Chevrolet | 51.554 | 174.574 |
| 42 | 40 | Scott Wimmer* | Key Motorsports | Chevrolet | 52.327 | 171.995 |
| 43 | 05 | David Starr (i) | Day Enterprises Motorsports | Chevrolet | 51.061 | 176.260 |
Failed to Qualify, withdrew, or driver changes
| 44 | 55 | Brett Rowe | Faith Motorsports | Chevrolet | 51.252 | 175.603 |
| 45 | 79 | Jennifer Jo Cobb (R) | 2nd Chance Motorsports | Ford | 51.846 | 173.591 |
Official Starting Lineup

* – made the field via owners points.

** – Reed Sorenson had to start at the rear of the field for adjustments outside impound.

== Race ==
Pole sitter Clint Bowyer led the first lap of the race. On lap 2, Joey Logano took the lead from Bowyer. Tony Stewart took the lead on lap 3 followed by Kyle Busch on the next lap. Joey Logano took the lead on lap 5. Tony Stewart took the lead on lap 8 from Logano. On lap 10, Stewart and his drafting partner Clint Bowyer swapped positions giving Bowyer the lead. On lap 16, the first caution flew for a 4 car accident in the tri-oval involving Landon Cassill, Brian Scott, Sam Hornish Jr., and Justin Allgaier. Clint Bowyer won the race off of pit road and he led the field to the restart on lap 21. Joey Logano took the lead from Bowyer on the restart with a push from Trevor Bayne. On lap 22, Kyle Busch took the lead with a push from Brad Keselowski. On lap 24, the 2nd caution flew for a 6 car crash in turn 1. It started when Todd Bodine was pushing Michael Annett when Bodine turned Annett and Annett collected Mike Wallace, Elliott Sadler, Ricky Stenhouse Jr., and Kenny Wallace. The race would restart on lap 29. On lap 30, Danica Patrick took the lead from Kyle Busch. Brad Keselowski would take the lead on lap 31. On lap 33, Joey Logano took the lead but immediately gave it back to Keselowski when he and Kyle Busch swapped positions. On lap 37, Keselowski and Trevor Bayne swapped positions giving Bayne the lead. Joey Logano tried to take the lead but could not do it and ended up swapping with Busch. On lap 40, Bayne and Keselowski swapped giving the Keselowski the lead. They two did it again on lap 52. On lap 56, the third caution flew when Sam Hornish Jr. crashed off of turn 4 after getting spun by Todd Bodine. Brad Keselowski won the race off of pit road but did not get enough fuel in the car and had to come back in. Dale Earnhardt Jr. was in 2nd but was penalized for dragging equipment out of the box. Joey Logano led the field to the restart on lap 60. Kyle Busch tried to take the lead with help from Clint Bowyer but could not make it past and the two ended up finding different partners. On lap 67, Bowyer took the lead with help from Tony Stewart.

=== Final Laps ===
With 49 laps to go, Joey Logano took the lead. With 47 to go, Logano and Kyle Busch switched positions giving Busch the lead. With 45 to go, Tony Stewart led the lap racing side by side with Busch before he and Clint Bowyer got out in front when Busch and Logano had to swap again. With 43 to go, Logano took the lead from Stewart. With 42 to go, Clint Bowyer took the lead. With 36 to go, Kyle Busch took the lead. He and Logano soon swapped positions on the next lap. With 34 to go, Tony Stewart took the lead. With 27 to go, Joey Logano took the lead. Clint Bowyer took the lead on the next lap. Green flag pitstops soon began with about 25 to go. With 21 to go, Joey Logano took the lead when Bowyer and Stewart made their pitstops. Logano made his pitstops giving the lead to Kyle Busch. With 20 to go, the fourth caution flew for debris. The race restarted with 16 to go. But coming to 15 to go, the 5th and final caution flew for a 5 car crash when Brad Keselowski got hit in the right front by Landon Cassill and got hit in the rear by Trevor Bayne causing Keselowski to spin and collect Todd Bodine, Josh Wise, and Patrick Sheltra. The race was red flagged to clean up the mess. The race restarted with 6 laps to go with Clint Bowyer as the leader. With 4 to go, Kyle Busch led the lap but could not get in front of Bowyer and his drafting partner Dale Earnhardt Jr. Behind them was a tandem of Landon Cassill and Tony Stewart. With 2 to go, Cassill and Stewart swapped positions and attempted to catch Bowyer and Earnhardt Jr. They got passed by a tandem of Joey Logano and Kyle Busch in the process. On the final lap, the Logano–Busch tandem attempted to pass the Bowyer–Earnhardt Jr. tandem on the outside. But Busch hooked Logano and sent Logano into the outside wall in turns 1 and 2 ending their races. Through turns 3 and 4, the Stewart–Cassill tandem peaked to the outside of the Bowyer–Earnhardt Jr. tandem and tried to pass them off of turn 4. Bowyer went up to block Stewart and decided to go back down thinking he had the race won. But the Stewart–Cassill tandem got a big run coming through the tri-oval and Stewart beat Bowyer by 0.007 seconds in a very close finish. The win would be Stewart's 4th Nationwide Series opening win in a row and his 6th of the last 7 Nationwide Series openers. The margin of victory at 0.007 seconds is currently the 7th closest finish in Nationwide Series history. Bowyer, Landon Cassill, Dale Earnhardt Jr., and Reed Sorenson rounded out the top 5 while Jason Leffler, Kyle Busch, Ricky Stenhouse Jr., Michael Waltrip, and Trevor Bayne rounded out the top 10.

== Race results ==
| Pos | Car | Driver | Team | Manufacturer | Laps Run | Laps Led | Status | Points |
|---|---|---|---|---|---|---|---|---|
| 1 | 4 | Tony Stewart (i) | Kevin Harvick Inc. | Chevrolet | 120 | 13 | running | 0 |
| 2 | 33 | Clint Bowyer (i) | Kevin Harvick Inc. | Chevrolet | 120 | 40 | running | 0 |
| 3 | 1 | Landon Cassill | Phoenix Racing | Chevrolet | 120 | 0 | running | 41 |
| 4 | 5 | Dale Earnhardt Jr. (i) | JR Motorsports | Chevrolet | 120 | 0 | running | 0 |
| 5 | 32 | Reed Sorenson | Turner Motorsports | Chevrolet | 120 | 0 | running | 39 |
| 6 | 30 | Jason Leffler | Turner Motorsports | Chevrolet | 120 | 0 | running | 38 |
| 7 | 18 | Kyle Busch (i) | Joe Gibbs Racing | Toyota | 120 | 17 | running | 0 |
| 8 | 6 | Ricky Stenhouse Jr. | Roush Fenway Racing | Toyota | 120 | 0 | running | 36 |
| 9 | 99 | Michael Waltrip (i) | Pastrana-Waltrip Racing | Toyota | 120 | 0 | running | 0 |
| 10 | 16 | Trevor Bayne | Roush Fenway Racing | Ford | 120 | 9 | running | 35 |
| 11 | 38 | Kasey Kahne (i) | Turner Motorsports | Chevrolet | 120 | 0 | running | 0 |
| 12 | 22 | Joey Logano (i) | Joe Gibbs Racing | Toyota | 120 | 22 | running | 0 |
| 13 | 19 | Mike Bliss | TriStar Motorsports | Chevrolet | 119 | 0 | running | 31 |
| 14 | 7 | Danica Patrick | JR Motorsports | Chevrolet | 119 | 1 | running | 31 |
| 15 | 87 | Joe Nemechek | NEMCO Motorsports | Toyota | 119 | 0 | running | 29 |
| 16 | 51 | Jeremy Clements | Jeremy Clements Racing | Chevrolet | 119 | 0 | running | 28 |
| 17 | 52 | Bobby Santos III | Means Motorsports | Chevrolet | 119 | 0 | running | 27 |
| 18 | 15 | Todd Bodine (i) | Germain Racing | Toyota | 119 | 0 | running | 0 |
| 19 | 88 | Aric Almirola | JR Motorsports | Chevrolet | 119 | 0 | running | 25 |
| 20 | 66 | Steve Wallace | Rusty Wallace Racing | Toyota | 118 | 0 | running | 24 |
| 21 | 05 | David Starr (i) | Day Enterprises Motorsports | Chevrolet | 118 | 0 | running | 0 |
| 22 | 70 | Shelby Howard | ML Motorsports | Chevrolet | 118 | 0 | running | 22 |
| 23 | 81 | Donnie Neuenberger | MacDonald Motorsports | Dodge | 118 | 0 | running | 21 |
| 24 | 41 | Patrick Sheltra | Rick Ware Racing | Ford | 118 | 0 | running | 20 |
| 25 | 28 | Derrike Cope | Jay Robinson Racing | Chevrolet | 118 | 0 | running | 19 |
| 26 | 89 | Morgan Shepherd | Faith Motorsports | Chevrolet | 117 | 0 | running | 18 |
| 27 | 31 | Justin Allgaier | Turner Motorsports | Chevrolet | 116 | 0 | running | 17 |
| 28 | 09 | Kenny Wallace | RAB Racing | Toyota | 115 | 0 | running | 16 |
| 29 | 60 | Carl Edwards (i) | Roush Fenway Racing | Ford | 107 | 0 | running | 0 |
| 30 | 22 | Brad Keselowski (i) | Penske Racing | Dodge | 105 | 17 | crash | 0 |
| 31 | 39 | Josh Wise | Go Green Racing | Ford | 103 | 0 | crash | 13 |
| 32 | 23 | Robert Richardson Jr. | R3 Motorsports | Dodge | 103 | 0 | overheating | 12 |
| 33 | 14 | Eric McClure | TriStar Motorsports | Chevrolet | 95 | 0 | running | 11 |
| 34 | 11 | Brian Scott | Joe Gibbs Racing | Toyota | 70 | 0 | engine | 10 |
| 35 | 40 | Scott Wimmer | Key Motorsports | Chevrolet | 57 | 0 | engine | 9 |
| 36 | 12 | Sam Hornish Jr. | Penske Racing | Dodge | 53 | 0 | crash | 8 |
| 37 | 01 | Mike Wallace | JD Motorsports | Chevrolet | 51 | 1 | running | 8 |
| 38 | 2 | Elliott Sadler | Kevin Harvick Inc. | Chevrolet | 45 | 0 | running | 6 |
| 39 | 62 | Michael Annett | Rusty Wallace Racing | Toyota | 26 | 0 | crash | 5 |
| 40 | 44 | Jeff Green | TriStar Motorsports | Chevrolet | 18 | 0 | rear gear | 4 |
| 41 | 24 | Kevin Lepage | Team Rensi Motorsports | Ford | 12 | 0 | vibration | 3 |
| 42 | 27 | J. R. Fitzpatrick | Baker Curb Racing | Ford | 10 | 0 | crash | 2 |
| 43 | 25 | Kelly Bires | Team Rensi Motorsports | Ford | 5 | 0 | overheating | 1 |
Official Race results

| Previous race: 2010 Ford 300 | NASCAR Nationwide Series; 2011 season | Next race: 2011 Bashas' Supermarket 200 |
