= 2011 NASCAR Nationwide Series =

American motorsport season

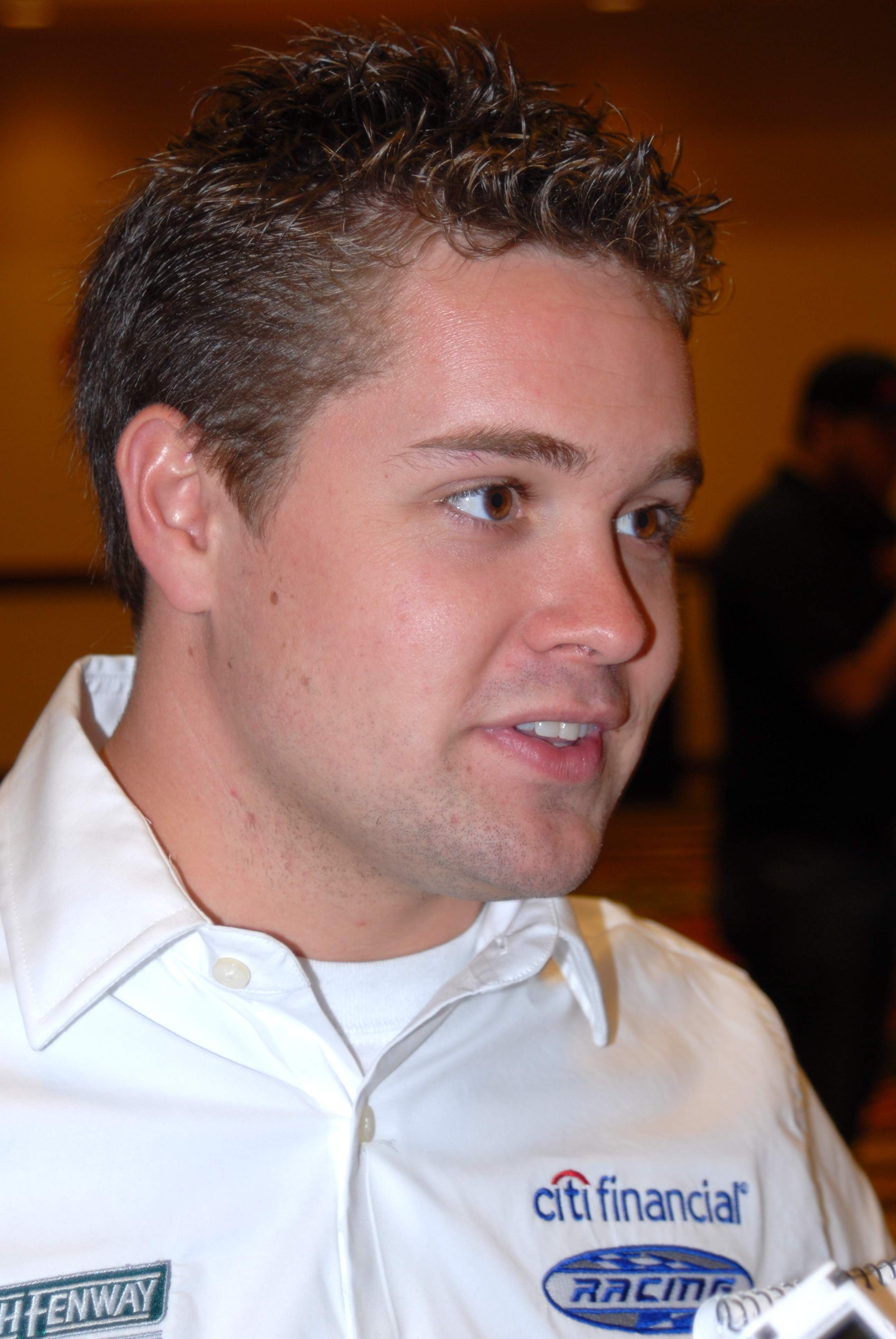
Ricky Stenhouse Jr., the 2011 Nationwide Series champion

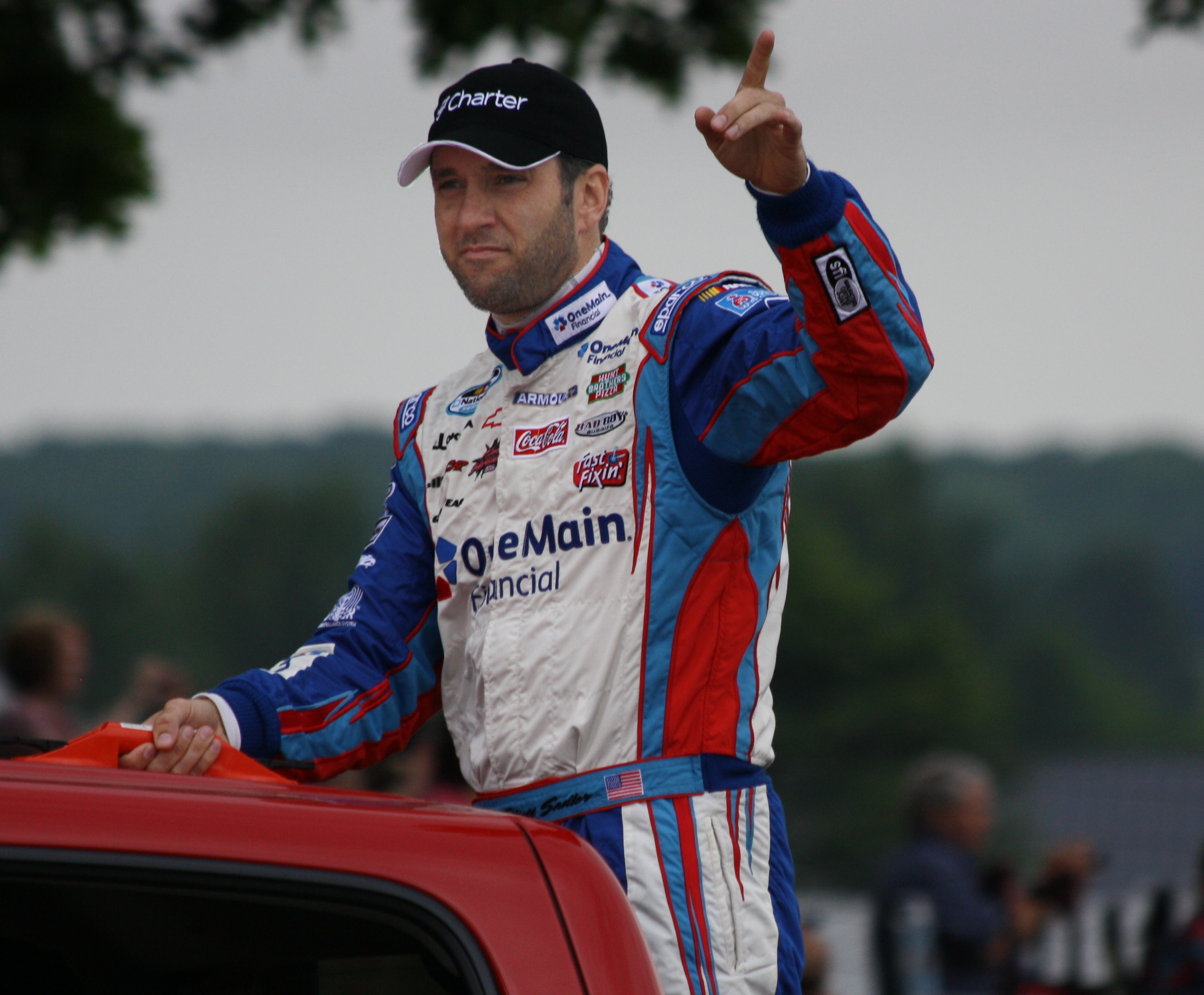
Elliott Sadler finished second behind Stenhouse in the championship by 45 points.

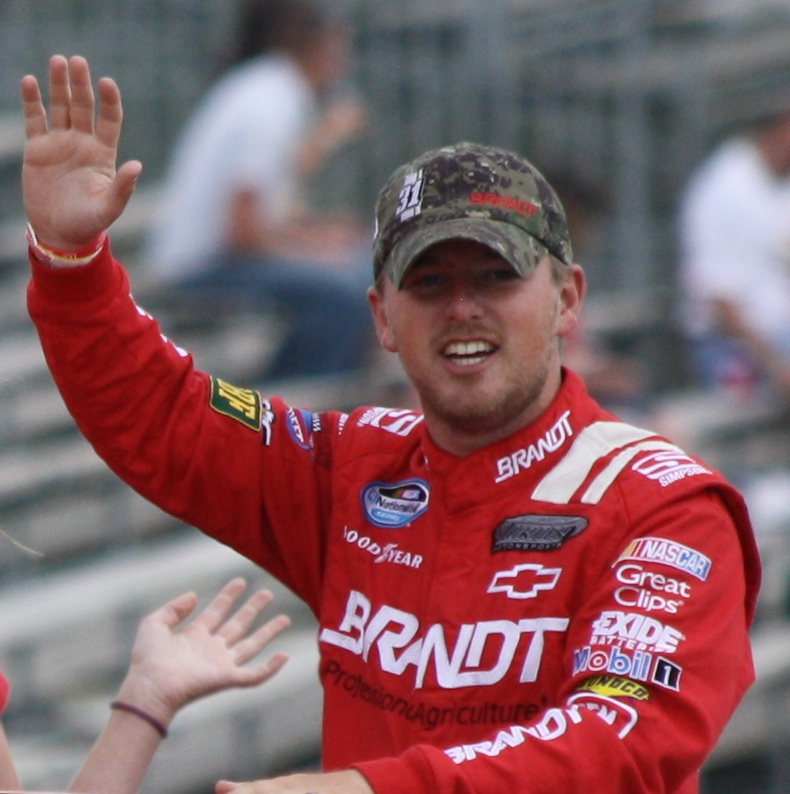
Justin Allgaier finished third in the championship, 117 points behind Stenhouse.

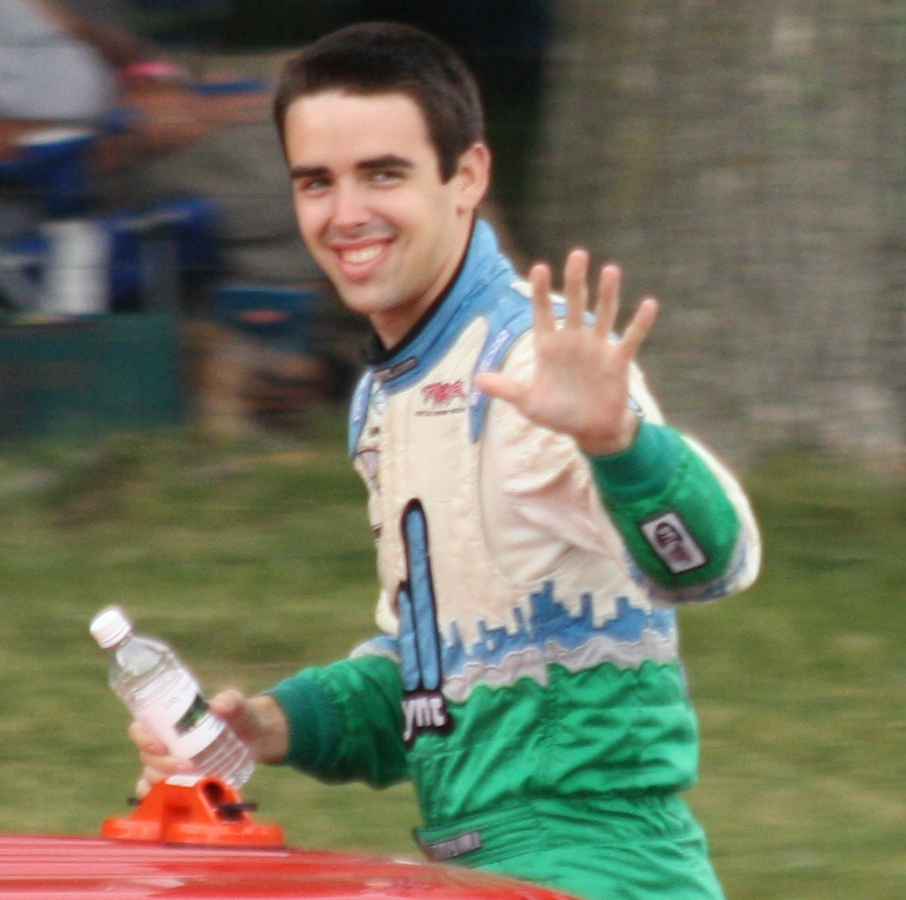
Timmy Hill, the 2011 Nationwide Series Rookie of the Year.

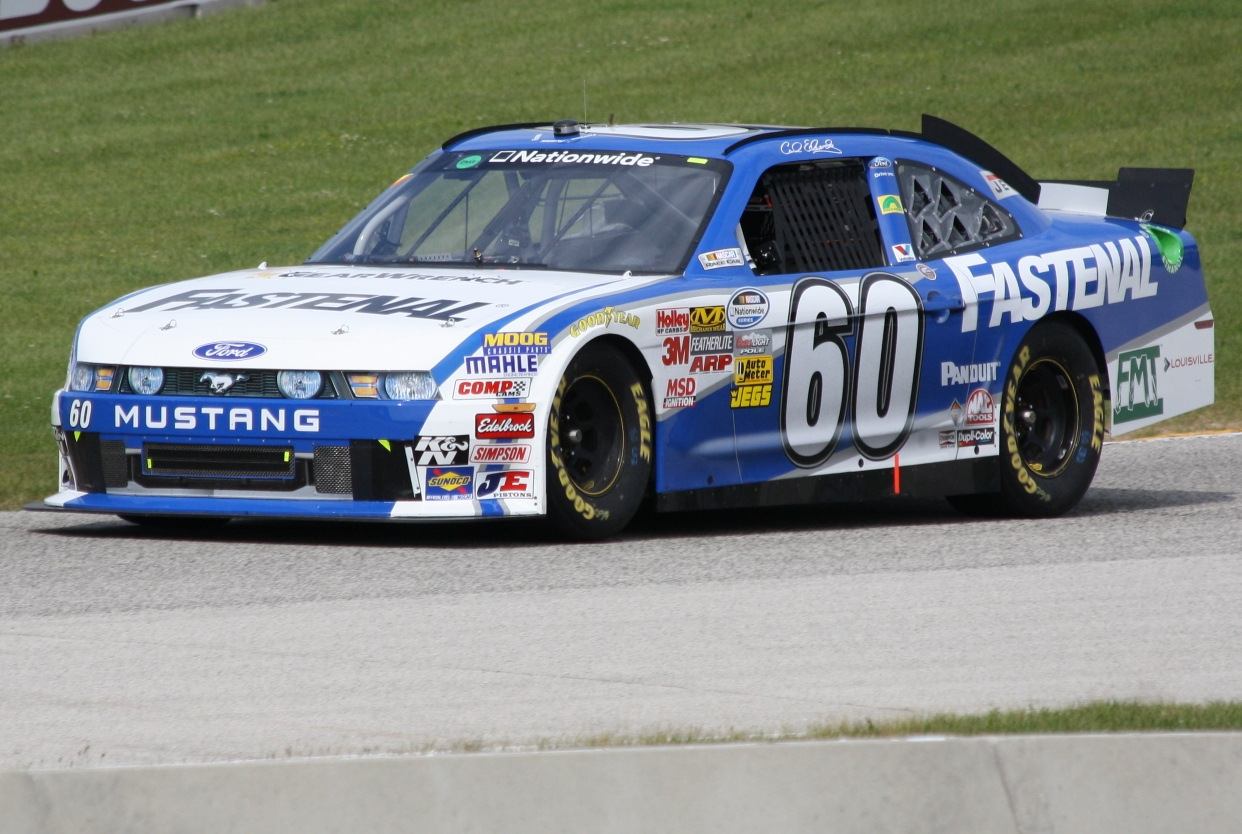
The No. 60, driven primarily by Carl Edwards, wins the owner's championship for Jack Roush.

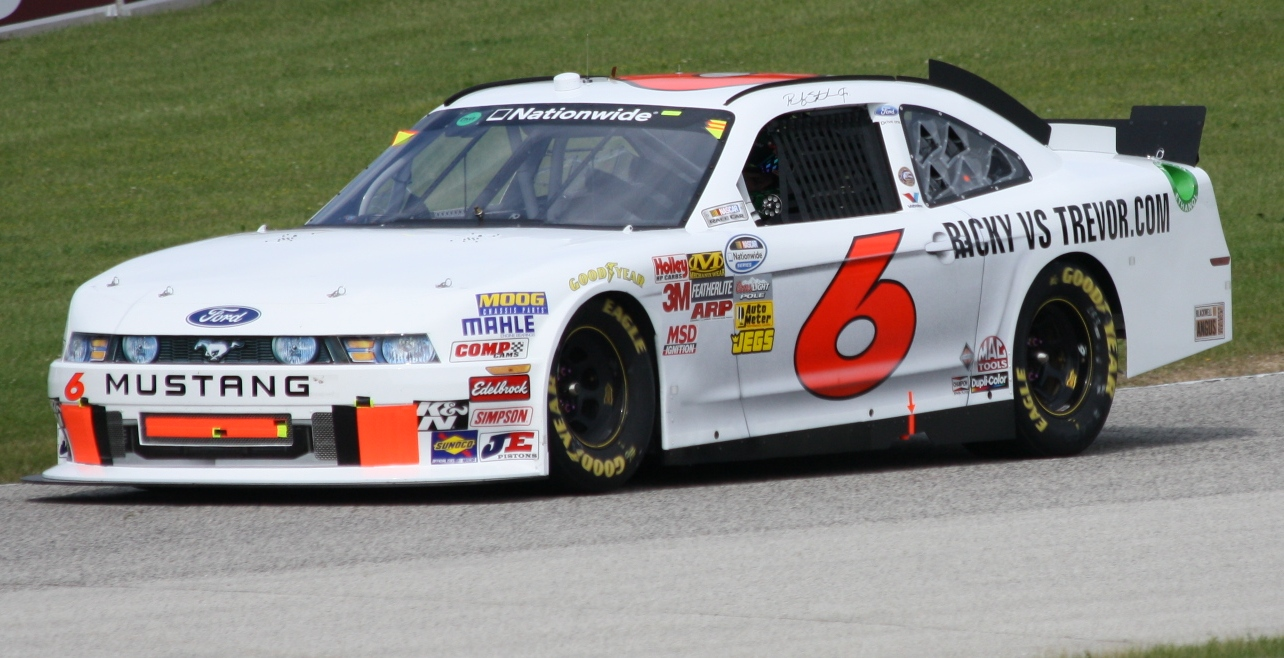
Ricky Stenhouse Jr.'s 2011 Nationwide championship car at Road America. Ford won the Manufacturer's championship with 13 wins and 212 points.

The 2011 NASCAR Nationwide Series was the 30th season of the NASCAR Nationwide Series, the second national professional stock car racing series sanctioned by NASCAR in the United States. The season included thirty-four races, beginning with the DRIVE4COPD 300 at Daytona International Speedway and ending with the Ford 300 at Homestead-Miami Speedway. During the 2010 season, NASCAR announced a few notable calendar changes, including race additions at Iowa Speedway and Chicagoland Speedway, and the removal of Gateway International Raceway from the schedule. Jack Roush won the Owners' Championship, while Ricky Stenhouse Jr. of Roush Fenway Racing won the Drivers' Championship with a second-place finish at the final race of the season. Ford won the Manufacturers' Championship with 212 points.

== Teams and drivers ==
=== Complete schedule ===
Manufacturer	Team	No.	Driver	Crew chief
Chevrolet	Faith Motorsports	89	Morgan Shepherd	Gary Ravan
Chevrolet	JD Motorsports	01	Mike Wallace	Patrick Magee
Chevrolet	Jeremy Clements Racing	51	Jeremy Clements	Ricky Pearson
Chevrolet	JR Motorsports	7	Danica Patrick 12	Tony Eury Jr. 33; Chris Heroy 1
Chevrolet	JR Motorsports	7	Josh Wise 14	Tony Eury Jr. 33; Chris Heroy 1
Chevrolet	JR Motorsports	7	Dale Earnhardt Jr. 1	Tony Eury Jr. 33; Chris Heroy 1
Chevrolet	JR Motorsports	7	Ron Fellows 1	Tony Eury Jr. 33; Chris Heroy 1
Chevrolet	JR Motorsports	7	Kasey Kahne 2	Tony Eury Jr. 33; Chris Heroy 1
Chevrolet	JR Motorsports	7	Jimmie Johnson 1	Tony Eury Jr. 33; Chris Heroy 1
Chevrolet	JR Motorsports	7	Jamie McMurray 3	Tony Eury Jr. 33; Chris Heroy 1
Chevrolet	JR Motorsports	88	Aric Almirola	Tony Eury Sr.
Chevrolet	Kevin Harvick, Inc.	2	Elliott Sadler	Ernie Cope
Chevrolet	Kevin Harvick, Inc.	33	Clint Bowyer 9	Chris Carrier
Chevrolet	Kevin Harvick, Inc.	33	Kevin Harvick 12	Chris Carrier
Chevrolet	Kevin Harvick, Inc.	33	Paul Menard 7	Chris Carrier
Chevrolet	Kevin Harvick, Inc.	33	Austin Dillon 4	Chris Carrier
Chevrolet	Kevin Harvick, Inc.	33	Max Papis 1	Chris Carrier
Chevrolet	Kevin Harvick, Inc.	33	David Mayhew 1	Chris Carrier
Chevrolet	Kevin Harvick, Inc.	33	Scott Speed 1	Chris Carrier
Chevrolet	TriStar Motorsports	14	Eric McClure 33	Gary Cogswell 33; Paul Clapprood 1
Chevrolet	TriStar Motorsports	14	Mike Bliss 1	Gary Cogswell 33; Paul Clapprood 1
Chevrolet	TriStar Motorsports	19	Mike Bliss 33	Paul Clapprood 33; Gary Cogswell 1
Chevrolet	TriStar Motorsports	19	Eric McClure 1	Paul Clapprood 33; Gary Cogswell 1
Chevrolet	TriStar Motorsports	44	Jeff Green 30	Todd Myers
Chevrolet	TriStar Motorsports	44	Charles Lewandoski (R) 1	Todd Myers
Chevrolet	TriStar Motorsports	44	Angela Cope 3	Todd Myers
Chevrolet	Turner Motorsports	30	Jason Leffler 8	Eddie Pardue 8 Stewart Cooper 26
Chevrolet	Turner Motorsports	30	Ryan Newman 1	Eddie Pardue 8 Stewart Cooper 26
Chevrolet	Turner Motorsports	30	Reed Sorenson 4	Eddie Pardue 8 Stewart Cooper 26
Chevrolet	Turner Motorsports	30	James Buescher 9	Eddie Pardue 8 Stewart Cooper 26
Chevrolet	Turner Motorsports	30	Mikey Kile 5	Eddie Pardue 8 Stewart Cooper 26
Chevrolet	Turner Motorsports	30	Kasey Kahne 2	Eddie Pardue 8 Stewart Cooper 26
Chevrolet	Turner Motorsports	30	Ricky Carmichael 3	Eddie Pardue 8 Stewart Cooper 26
Chevrolet	Turner Motorsports	30	Boris Said 1	Eddie Pardue 8 Stewart Cooper 26
Chevrolet	Turner Motorsports	30	Nelson Piquet Jr. 1	Eddie Pardue 8 Stewart Cooper 26
Chevrolet	Turner Motorsports	31	Justin Allgaier	Jimmy Elledge
Chevrolet	Turner Motorsports	32	Reed Sorenson 25	Trent Owens
Chevrolet	Turner Motorsports	32	Mark Martin 4	Trent Owens
Chevrolet	Turner Motorsports	32	Brian Vickers 3	Trent Owens
Chevrolet	Turner Motorsports	32	Ron Hornaday Jr. 1	Trent Owens
Chevrolet	Turner Motorsports	32	James Buescher 1	Trent Owens
Chevrolet	Turner Motorsports	38	Kasey Kahne 8	Stewart Cooper 8 Eddie Pardue 26
Chevrolet	Turner Motorsports	38	Jason Leffler 26	Stewart Cooper 8 Eddie Pardue 26
Chevrolet	Key Motorsports	40	Scott Wimmer 12	Gary Showalter
Chevrolet	Key Motorsports	40	Charles Lewandoski (R) 10	Gary Showalter
Chevrolet	Key Motorsports	40	Chase Miller 1	Gary Showalter
Chevrolet	Key Motorsports	40	Tim Andrews 1	Gary Showalter
Chevrolet	Key Motorsports	40	Josh Wise 8	Gary Showalter
Chevrolet	Key Motorsports	40	T. J. Duke 2	Gary Showalter
Dodge	Penske Racing	22	Brad Keselowski 29	Todd Gordon
Dodge	Penske Racing	22	Jacques Villeneuve 2	Todd Gordon
Dodge	Penske Racing	22	Sam Hornish Jr. 1	Todd Gordon
Dodge	Penske Racing	22	Kurt Busch 1	Todd Gordon
Dodge	Penske Racing	22	Parker Kligerman 1	Todd Gordon
Ford	Go Green Racing	39	Josh Wise 8	Clinton Cram
Ford	Go Green Racing	39	Charles Lewandoski (R) 2	Clinton Cram
Ford	Go Green Racing	39	Danny O'Quinn Jr. 3	Clinton Cram
Ford	Go Green Racing	39	Danny Efland 4	Clinton Cram
Ford	Go Green Racing	39	Luis Martinez Jr. 3	Clinton Cram
Ford	Go Green Racing	39	Will Kimmel 1	Clinton Cram
Ford	Go Green Racing	39	Matt Frahm 3	Clinton Cram
Ford	Go Green Racing	39	Joey Gase 5	Clinton Cram
Ford	Go Green Racing	39	Casey Roderick 1	Clinton Cram
Ford	Go Green Racing	39	Fain Skinner 3	Clinton Cram
Ford	Go Green Racing	39	Matt Carter 1	Clinton Cram
Ford	Roush Fenway Racing	6	Ricky Stenhouse Jr.	Mike Kelley
Ford	Roush Fenway Racing	60	Carl Edwards 33	Mike Beam
Ford	Roush Fenway Racing	60	Billy Johnson 1	Mike Beam
Ford	Rick Ware Racing	15	Timmy Hill 33 (R)	Mike Hillman Jr. 1 Bobby Burrell 33
Toyota	Germain Racing	15	Todd Bodine 1	Mike Hillman Jr. 1 Bobby Burrell 33
Toyota	Joe Gibbs Racing	11	Brian Scott	Kevin Kidd
Toyota	Joe Gibbs Racing	18	Kyle Busch 20	Jason Ratcliff 30; Adam Stevens 4
Toyota	Joe Gibbs Racing	18	Kelly Bires 2	Jason Ratcliff 30; Adam Stevens 4
Toyota	Joe Gibbs Racing	18	Michael McDowell 5	Jason Ratcliff 30; Adam Stevens 4
Toyota	Joe Gibbs Racing	18	Drew Herring 1	Jason Ratcliff 30; Adam Stevens 4
Toyota	Joe Gibbs Racing	18	Joey Logano 4	Jason Ratcliff 30; Adam Stevens 4
Toyota	Joe Gibbs Racing	18	Denny Hamlin 2	Jason Ratcliff 30; Adam Stevens 4
Toyota	RAB Racing	09	Kenny Wallace	Scott Zipadelli
Toyota	Rusty Wallace Racing	62	Michael Annett	Rick Viers
Toyota	Rusty Wallace Racing	66	Steve Wallace	Doug Randolph
Chevrolet Dodge	Jay Robinson Racing	28	Derrike Cope 33	Curtis Aldridge
Chevrolet Dodge	Jay Robinson Racing	28	Dennis Setzer 1	Curtis Aldridge
Chevrolet Dodge	Means Motorsports	52	Bobby Santos III 1	Timothy Brown
Chevrolet Dodge	Means Motorsports	52	Daryl Harr 3	Timothy Brown
Chevrolet Dodge	Means Motorsports	52	Tim Schendel 6	Timothy Brown
Chevrolet Dodge	Means Motorsports	52	Tony Raines 2	Timothy Brown
Chevrolet Dodge	Means Motorsports	52	Danny Efland 1	Timothy Brown
Chevrolet Dodge	Means Motorsports	52	Kevin Lepage 17	Timothy Brown
Chevrolet Dodge	Means Motorsports	52	Dan Clarke 1	Timothy Brown
Chevrolet Dodge	Means Motorsports	52	Louis-Philippe Dumoulin 1	Timothy Brown
Chevrolet Dodge	MacDonald Motorsports	52	Blake Koch (R) 1	Timothy Brown
Chevrolet Dodge	Corrie Stott Racing	52	Jamie Dick 1	Timothy Brown
Chevrolet Dodge	MacDonald Motorsports	81	Donnie Neuenberger 4	David Ingram 6 John Monsam 28
Chevrolet Dodge	MacDonald Motorsports	81	Blake Koch (R) 28	David Ingram 6 John Monsam 28
Chevrolet Dodge	MacDonald Motorsports	81	Maryeve Dufault 1	David Ingram 6 John Monsam 28
Chevrolet Dodge	MacDonald Motorsports	81	Scott Wimmer 1	David Ingram 6 John Monsam 28
Chevrolet Dodge	ML Motorsports	70	Shelby Howard 5	Mark Gutekunst
Chevrolet Dodge	ML Motorsports	70	David Stremme 13	Mark Gutekunst
Chevrolet Dodge	ML Motorsports	70	Scott Wimmer 3	Mark Gutekunst
Chevrolet Dodge	Jay Robinson Racing	70	Dennis Setzer 10	Mark Gutekunst
Chevrolet Dodge	Randy Hill Racing	70	Casey Roderick 1	Mark Gutekunst
Chevrolet Dodge	MacDonald Motorsports	70	Blake Koch (R) 1	Mark Gutekunst
Chevrolet Dodge	Tri-Star Motorsports	70	Angela Cope 1	Mark Gutekunst
Chevrolet Dodge	R3 Motorsports	23	Robert Richardson Jr. 23	Greg Conner
Chevrolet Dodge	R3 Motorsports	23	Scott Riggs 2	Greg Conner
Chevrolet Dodge	R3 Motorsports	23	Alex Kennedy 4	Greg Conner
Chevrolet Dodge	Jay Robinson Racing	23	David Green 1	Greg Conner
Chevrolet Dodge	Jay Robinson Racing	23	Dennis Setzer 3	Greg Conner
Chevrolet Dodge	TriStar Motorsports	23	Angela Cope 1	Greg Conner
Ford Chevrolet	Rick Ware Racing	41	Patrick Sheltra 1	Doug Richert 1 Sterling Laughlin 24; Steve Kukyendall 3
Ford Chevrolet	Rick Ware Racing	41	Carl Long 13	Doug Richert 1 Sterling Laughlin 24; Steve Kukyendall 3
Ford Chevrolet	Rick Ware Racing	41	Jennifer Jo Cobb 3	Doug Richert 1 Sterling Laughlin 24; Steve Kukyendall 3
Ford Chevrolet	Rick Ware Racing	41	Jeffrey Earnhardt 2	Doug Richert 1 Sterling Laughlin 24; Steve Kukyendall 3
Ford Chevrolet	Rick Ware Racing	41	Doug Harrington 1	Doug Richert 1 Sterling Laughlin 24; Steve Kukyendall 3
Ford Chevrolet	Rick Ware Racing	41	Fain Skinner 1	Doug Richert 1 Sterling Laughlin 24; Steve Kukyendall 3
Ford Chevrolet	Rick Ware Racing	41	Matt Carter 1	Doug Richert 1 Sterling Laughlin 24; Steve Kukyendall 3
Ford Chevrolet	Rick Ware Racing	41	Tomy Drissi 2	Doug Richert 1 Sterling Laughlin 24; Steve Kukyendall 3
Ford Chevrolet	Rick Ware Racing	41	Johnny Chapman 9	Doug Richert 1 Sterling Laughlin 24; Steve Kukyendall 3
Ford Chevrolet	Rick Ware Racing	41	Stanton Barrett 1	Doug Richert 1 Sterling Laughlin 24; Steve Kukyendall 3
Chevrolet Toyota	NEMCO Motorsports	87	Joe Nemechek 23	Billy Wilburn
Chevrolet Toyota	NEMCO Motorsports	87	Kevin Conway 9	Billy Wilburn
Chevrolet Toyota	NEMCO Motorsports	87	Scott Wimmer 1	Billy Wilburn
Chevrolet Toyota	Kyle Busch Motorsports	87	Kimi Räikkönen 1	Billy Wilburn

=== Limited schedule ===
Manufacturer	Team	No.	Driver	Crew chief	Rounds
Chevrolet	Corrie Stott Racing	02	Jamie Dick	Corrie Stott 2 Carl Harr 1	2
Chevrolet	WestWorld Motorsports	02	Daryl Harr	Corrie Stott 2 Carl Harr 1	1
Chevrolet	Day Enterprises Motorsports	05	David Starr	Newt Moore	3
Chevrolet	Day Enterprises Motorsports	05	Willie Allen	Newt Moore	2
Chevrolet	Danny Efland Racing	07	Danny Efland	Micah Horton	1
Chevrolet	Faith Motorsports	55	Brett Rowe	Morris Van Vleet	12
Chevrolet	Jay Robinson Racing	48	Dennis Setzer	Mike Miller	5
Chevrolet	Jay Robinson Racing	49	Brad Teague	Mark Fordham	2
Chevrolet	Jay Robinson Racing	49	Dennis Setzer	Mark Fordham	6
Chevrolet	Jay Robinson Racing	49	David Green	Mark Fordham	2
Chevrolet	Jay Robinson Racing	49	Mark Green	Mark Fordham	14
Chevrolet	JD Motorsports	0	James Hylton	Brad Hicks	1
Chevrolet	JD Motorsports	0	Brad Teague	Brad Hicks	1
Chevrolet	JD Motorsports	0	Tim Schendel	Brad Hicks	1
Chevrolet	JR Motorsports	5	Dale Earnhardt Jr.	Chris Heroy 2 Tony Eury Jr. 1 Jim Long 1	2
Chevrolet	JR Motorsports	5	Ron Fellows	Chris Heroy 2 Tony Eury Jr. 1 Jim Long 1	2
Chevrolet	Kevin Harvick, Inc.	4	Kevin Harvick	Bruce Cook	3
Chevrolet	Kevin Harvick, Inc.	4	Tony Stewart	Bruce Cook	1
Chevrolet	Kevin Harvick, Inc.	9	Tony Stewart	Bruce Cook	1
Chevrolet	Key Motorsports	42	Tim Andrews	Doyle Myrick	14
Chevrolet	Key Motorsports	42	Scott Wimmer	Doyle Myrick	1
Chevrolet	Key Motorsports	42	Chase Miller	Doyle Myrick	1
Chevrolet	Key Motorsports	42	Erik Darnell	Doyle Myrick	2
Chevrolet	Key Motorsports	42	Josh Wise	Doyle Myrick	1
Chevrolet	Key Motorsports	42	Scott Speed	Doyle Myrick	1
Chevrolet	Key Motorsports	46	Tim Andrews	J. C. Hall	1
Chevrolet	Key Motorsports	46	Chase Miller	J. C. Hall	20
Chevrolet	Key Motorsports	46	Brett Rowe	J. C. Hall	1
Chevrolet	Key Motorsports	47	Danny Efland	Clint Myrick	1
Chevrolet	Key Motorsports	47	Scott Wimmer	Clint Myrick	1
Chevrolet	Key Motorsports	47	Charles Lewandoski (R)	Clint Myrick	4
Chevrolet	Key Motorsports	47	Brian Keselowski	Clint Myrick	6
Chevrolet	Key Motorsports	47	Scott Speed	Clint Myrick	3
Chevrolet	Key Motorsports	47	Josh Wise	Clint Myrick	1
Chevrolet	Keystone Motorsports	93	Amber Cope	Jamie Lathrop	1
Chevrolet	Mike Harmon Racing	74	Mike Harmon	Daniel Kolanda	17
Chevrolet	Mike Harmon Racing	74	J. J. Yeley	Daniel Kolanda	3
Chevrolet	Mike Harmon Racing	74	Jake Crum	Daniel Kolanda	1
Chevrolet	Mike Harmon Racing	74	Tony Raines	Daniel Kolanda	1
Chevrolet	Phoenix Racing	1	Landon Cassill	Nick Harrison	1
Chevrolet	Phoenix Racing	1	Jamie McMurray	Nick Harrison	3
Chevrolet	R3 Motorsports	03	Charles Lewandoski (R)	Stephen Gonzales	1
Chevrolet	R3 Motorsports	03	Chris Lawson	Stephen Gonzales	1
Chevrolet	R3 Motorsports	03	Alex Kennedy	Stephen Gonzales	1
Chevrolet	R3 Motorsports	03	Scott Riggs	Stephen Gonzales	10
Chevrolet	R3 Motorsports	03	Scott Wimmer	Stephen Gonzales	1
Chevrolet	R3 Motorsports	03	Marc Davis	Stephen Gonzales	2
Chevrolet	R3 Motorsports	03	Jean-François Dumoulin	Stephen Gonzales	1
Chevrolet	R3 Motorsports	50	Brian Simo	Stephen Gonzales	1
Chevrolet	MAKE Motorsports	50	T. J. Bell	Brad Parrott	9
Chevrolet	Richard Childress Racing	21	Tim George Jr.	Greg Kennon Jr.	4
Chevrolet	Turner Motorsports	34	James Buescher	Michael Shelton 1 Doug George 1	1
Chevrolet	Turner Motorsports	34	Ricky Carmichael	Michael Shelton 1 Doug George 1	1
Dodge	MacDonald Motorsports	80	D. J. Kennington	Joe Draper	1
Dodge	MacDonald Motorsports	82	Blake Koch (R)	John Monsam 3 David Ingram 7	2
Dodge	MacDonald Motorsports	82	J. J. Yeley	John Monsam 3 David Ingram 7	1
Dodge	MacDonald Motorsports	82	Scott Wimmer	John Monsam 3 David Ingram 7	1
Dodge	MacDonald Motorsports	82	Reed Sorenson	John Monsam 3 David Ingram 7	5
Dodge	NDS Motorsports	53	Andrew Ranger	James Lynch	3
Dodge	Penske Racing	12	Sam Hornish Jr.	Chad Walter	12
Dodge	Penske Racing	12	Alex Tagliani	Chad Walter	1
Dodge	Robby Gordon Motorsports	77	Robby Gordon	Samuel Stanley	1
Ford	Baker Curb Racing	27	J. R. Fitzpatrick	Wayne Grubb	2
Ford	Baker Curb Racing	27	Justin Marks	Wayne Grubb	1
Ford	Baker Curb Racing	27	J. J. Yeley	Wayne Grubb	2
Ford	Go Canada Racing	27	J. J. Yeley	Wayne Grubb	3
Ford	Go Canada Racing	67	J. R. Fitzpatrick	Newt Moore	5
Ford	Go Canada Racing	67	Andrew Ranger	Newt Moore	2
Ford	Go Green Racing	04	Charles Lewandoski (R)	Leo Desrocher Jr.	1
Ford	Go Green Racing	04	Kelly Bires	Leo Desrocher Jr.	2
Ford	Go Green Racing	04	Danny Efland	Leo Desrocher Jr.	1
Ford	Go Green Racing	04	Danny O'Quinn Jr.	Leo Desrocher Jr.	4
Ford	Go Green Racing	04	Tim Andrews	Leo Desrocher Jr.	3
Ford	Go Green Racing	04	Casey Roderick	Leo Desrocher Jr.	1
Ford	Go Green Racing	04	Benny Gordon	Leo Desrocher Jr.	1
Ford	Go Green Racing	04	Fain Skinner	Leo Desrocher Jr.	1
Ford	Randy Hill Racing	08	Casey Roderick	Jeff Spraker	2
Ford	Randy Hill Racing	08	David Ragan	Jeff Spraker	1
Ford	Richard Petty Motorsports	9	Marcos Ambrose	Chad Norris	1
Ford	Rick Ware Racing	71	Matt Carter	David Mitchell	10
Ford	Rick Ware Racing	71	Carl Long	David Mitchell	1
Ford	Rick Ware Racing	71	Clay Greenfield	David Mitchell	1
Ford	Rick Ware Racing	75	Carl Long	Scott Stolzenberg	12
Ford	Rick Ware Racing	75	Johnny Chapman	Scott Stolzenberg	12
Ford	Rick Ware Racing	75	Andy Ponstein	Scott Stolzenberg	1
Ford	Rick Ware Racing	75	Chris Cook	Scott Stolzenberg	2
Ford	Rick Ware Racing	75	Tomy Drissi	Scott Stolzenberg	2
Ford	Roush Fenway Racing	16	Trevor Bayne	Chad Norris 28; Chris Andrews 5	29
Ford	Roush Fenway Racing	16	Chris Buescher	Chad Norris 28; Chris Andrews 5	2
Ford	Roush Fenway Racing	16	Kevin Swindell	Chad Norris 28; Chris Andrews 5	1
Ford	Roush Fenway Racing	16	Matt Kenseth	Chad Norris 28; Chris Andrews 5	1
Ford	Team Rensi Motorsports	24	Kevin Lepage	Chris Wright	5
Ford	Team Rensi Motorsports	25	Kelly Bires	Richard Russell	4
Ford	Team Rensi Motorsports	25	Chad Finley	Richard Russell	1
Ford	2nd Chance Motorsports	79	Jennifer Jo Cobb (R)	Ben Leslie	3
Ford	2nd Chance Motorsports	79	Chris Lawson	Ben Leslie	1
Ford	2nd Chance Motorsports	79	Tim Andrews	Ben Leslie	9
Toyota	Joe Gibbs Racing	20	Joey Logano	Adam Stevens 24; Jason Ratcliff 6	18
Toyota	Joe Gibbs Racing	20	Denny Hamlin	Adam Stevens 24; Jason Ratcliff 6	3
Toyota	Joe Gibbs Racing	20	Drew Herring	Adam Stevens 24; Jason Ratcliff 6	3
Toyota	Joe Gibbs Racing	20	Ryan Truex	Adam Stevens 24; Jason Ratcliff 6	6
Toyota	James Carter Racing	72	John Jackson	Dave Fuge	6
Toyota	James Carter Racing	72	Jake Crum	Dave Fuge	1
Toyota	Pastrana-Waltrip Racing	99	Michael Waltrip	Jerry Baxter 5 Mike Greci 9	2
Toyota	Pastrana-Waltrip Racing	99	Ryan Truex (R)	Jerry Baxter 5 Mike Greci 9	11
Toyota	Pastrana-Waltrip Racing	99	David Reutimann	Jerry Baxter 5 Mike Greci 9	1
Toyota	Pastrana-Waltrip Racing	99	Cole Whitt	Jerry Baxter 5 Mike Greci 9	1
Toyota	Pastrana-Waltrip Racing	99	Patrick Carpentier	Jerry Baxter 5 Mike Greci 9	1
Toyota	Rusty Wallace Racing	64	David Reutimann	Larry Carter	5
Toyota	Rusty Wallace Racing	64	Jason Bowles	Larry Carter	3
Chevrolet Toyota	NEMCO Motorsports	97	Joe Nemechek	Mike Boerschinger	7
Chevrolet Toyota	NEMCO Motorsports	97	Kyle Kelley	Mike Boerschinger	2
Chevrolet Ford	Fleur-de-lis Motorsports	68	Carl Long	Craig Partee 11; Morris Van Vleet 1	3
Chevrolet Ford	Fleur-de-lis Motorsports	68	Matt Carter	Craig Partee 11; Morris Van Vleet 1	7
Chevrolet Ford	Fleur-de-lis Motorsports	68	Chase Miller	Craig Partee 11; Morris Van Vleet 1	1
Chevrolet Ford	Fleur-de-lis Motorsports	68	Jeremy Petty	Craig Partee 11; Morris Van Vleet 1	1
Chevrolet Ford	Rick Ware Racing	68	Tim Andrews	Sterling Laughlin	1
Dodge Ford	JJC Racing	13	Jennifer Jo Cobb (R)	Steve Kuykendall	19
Dodge Ford	JJC Racing	13	Rick Crawford	Steve Kuykendall	1
Dodge Ford	JJC Racing	13	T. J. Bell	Steve Kuykendall	1
Dodge Ford	JJC Racing	13	D. J. Kennington	Steve Kuykendall	1

=== Team changes ===
- Turner Motorsports ran four full-time teams during the season and switched to Chevrolets. They also used Hendrick Motorsports engines as well as getting technical support from Kevin Harvick, Inc.

Discontinued/suspended operations

- Germain Racing discontinued their Nationwide Series team this season because Michael Annett and sponsor Pilot Travel Centers moved to Rusty Wallace Racing. They, however, ran the No. 15 Toyota at Daytona with Todd Bodine sponsored by Tire Kingdom. Germain transferred the owners points of the No. 15 over to Rick Ware Racing who ran the No. 15 Ford for rookie Timmy Hill starting at Phoenix. Hill could not run Daytona because he was under 18.
- Richard Childress Racing has merged its Nationwide program with Kevin Harvick, Inc.
- Roush Fenway Racing discontinued the No. 98 car due to Paul Menard leaving for KHI. The owner points were sold to Go Green Racing.
- Due to a lack of sponsorship, Baker Curb Racing suspended all operations indefinitely for the season, though there are reports of the team putting together a car for Canadian J. R. Fitzpatrick for Daytona
- Due to the new rules package for the Nationwide Series, K-Automotive Motorsports decided to shut down its Nationwide program and focus on running Brian Keselowski in the Sprint Cup Series for Rookie of the Year.
- Stratus Racing Group failed to run a car during the season because owner/driver Derrike Cope moved back to Jay Robinson Racing after a 4-year hiatus from the team.

=== Driver changes ===
- Aric Almirola drove for JR Motorsports this season in the 88 car.
- Colin Braun was released by Roush-Fenway Racing because the team was focusing on sponsorship for Carl Edwards, Ricky Stenhouse Jr. and Trevor Bayne for this season.
- Elliott Sadler drive for KHI during 2011 in the 2 car.
- Sam Hornish Jr. drove the No. 12 Dodge for 10 races due to the No. 77 Sprint Cup team being renumbered to the No. 22 in The Cup Series.

Entering the series

- Travis Pastrana was to make his NASCAR debut with Pastrana-Waltrip Racing, running 7 races this season with sponsorship from Boost Mobile, beginning at Indianapolis. However, due to injuries sustained at X Games XVII, his debut was delayed until 2012.
- Pastrana-Waltrip Racing intended to field Ryan Truex for 20 races for ROTY honors, but the team was forced to pull out of the championship due to a lack of sponsorship.
- ARCA driver Timmy Hill ran for Rookie of the Year honors with Rick Ware Racing.
- Jennifer Jo Cobb was a ROTY campaigner with 2nd Chance Motorsports and planned to run the full season. However, she got into a heated argument with team owner Rick Russell at Bristol, and ran a few races with Rick Ware Racing.

Changed teams

- Paul Menard moved to Kevin Harvick, Inc., after two years with Roush-Fenway Racing.
- Michael Annett, along with sponsor Pilot Travel Centers, moved to Rusty Wallace Racing this season, after two seasons with Germain Racing, replacing Brendan Gaughan, who is heading back to the Camping World Truck Series with that team.
- Justin Allgaier joined Turner Motorsports this season, after two years with Penske Racing.
- Trevor Bayne signed with Roush-Fenway Racing during the 2010 season after Diamond Waltrip Racing was unable to renew their contract and has now signed on for a full year with the team. He'll drive the No. 16 vacated by Colin Braun.
- Eric McClure and sponsor Hefty left Team Rensi Motorsports after two years to drive for TriStar Motorsports in 2011
- Brian Scott was released by Turner Motorsports during the 2010 season and finished the season with RAB Racing. Scott moved to Joe Gibbs Racing to drive their No. 11 Toyota with Kevin Kidd as crew chief.
- Kenny Wallace drove for RAB Racing this season, after three seasons with Jay Robinson Racing.
- Mike Bliss leaves Key Motorsports to drive for TriStar Motorsports in the No. 19 Chevrolet.
- Scott Wimmer returned to full-time status for 2011, driving Key Motorsports' No. 40 Chevrolet.
- Jeremy Clements drove his No. 51 full-time in 2011, leaving Davis Motorsports.
- Shelby Howard left ML Motorsports before the Aaron's 312. David Stremme and Dennis Setzer filled the seat.
- Reed Sorenson was released by Turner Motorsports before the Kansas Lottery 300. Sprint Cup driver Brian Vickers replaced him for Kansas, Charlotte, and Texas.
- Derrike Cope moved back to Jay Robinson Racing after 4 years of driving his own car.

Exiting the series

- Brendan Gaughan returned to the Camping World Truck Series this year with Germain Racing, bringing sponsor South Point Hotel, Casino & Spa along with him.

=== Rookie entries ===
2010 NASCAR K&N East Series Champion Ryan Truex was intended to run 10–20 races with Pastrana-Waltrip Racing, and was the early favorite to win Rookie of the Year. However, sponsorship issues sidelined Truex's bid for the title, forcing him to sit out most of the season. He was later tabbed by Joe Gibbs Racing to drive their No. 20 Toyota late in the season. Blake Koch, returning to NASCAR after sitting 2010 out due to losing sponsorship, was to drive the No. 81 alongside veteran Donnie Neuenberger. However, Koch picked up sponsorship from Daystar Television Network, which eventually expanded to sponsoring Koch for the full year. Rick Ware Racing development driver Timmy Hill was 17 years old when the Nationwide Series hit Daytona, and thus was not approved to run until the next week in Phoenix. Jennifer Jo Cobb's rookie season was hampered by a fallout with 2nd Chance Motorsports owner Rick Russell over starting and parking, and she briefly moved to Rick Ware Racing before moving her own team up to Nationwide with limited success. Charles Lewandoski intended to make ten races for TriStar Motorsports, but ended up running some start and park efforts with Key Motorsports.

The ROTY lead would be contested mostly by Hill and Koch, who were tied heading into the season finale at Homestead. However, Hill prevailed over Koch and became the youngest Rookie of the Year in series history.

== Schedule ==
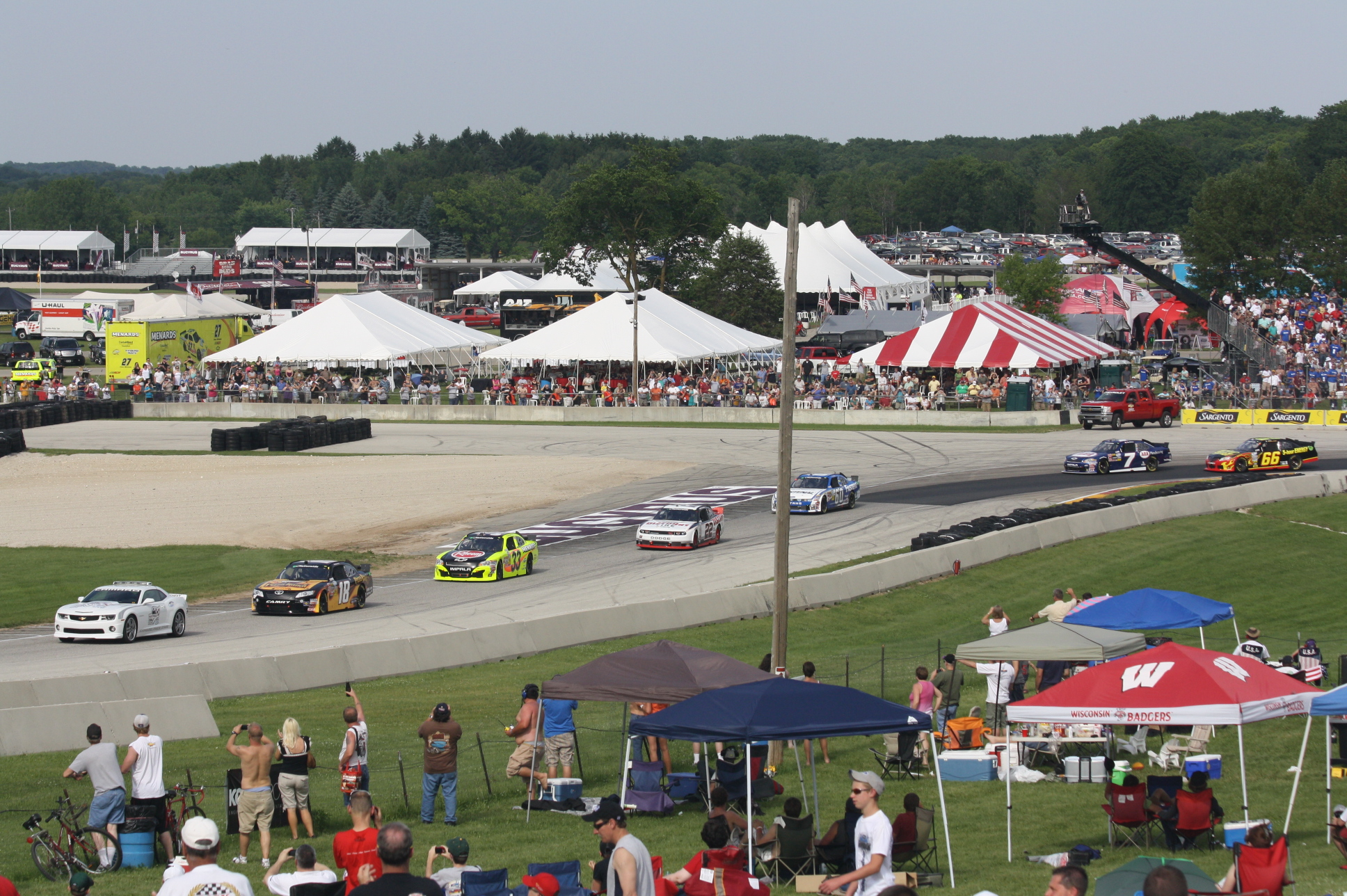
The Bucyrus 200 at Road America in June

No.	Race title	Track	location	Date
1	DRIVE4COPD 300	Daytona International Speedway	Daytona Beach, Florida	February 19
2	Bashas' Supermarkets 200	Phoenix International Raceway	Phoenix, Arizona	February 26
3	Sam's Town 300	Las Vegas Motor Speedway	Las Vegas, Nevada	March 5
4	Scotts EZ Seed 300	Bristol Motor Speedway	Bristol, Tennessee	March 19
5	Royal Purple 300	Auto Club Speedway	Fontana, California	March 26
6	O'Reilly Auto Parts 300	Texas Motor Speedway	Fort Worth, Texas	April 8
7	Aaron's 312	Talladega Superspeedway	Talladega, Alabama	April 16
8	Nashville 300	Nashville Superspeedway	Lebanon, Tennessee	April 23
9	Bubba Burger 250	Richmond International Raceway	Richmond, Virginia	April 29
10	Royal Purple 200	Darlington Raceway	Darlington, South Carolina	May 6
11	5-hour Energy 200	Dover International Speedway	Dover, Delaware	May 14
12	Iowa John Deere Dealers 250 presented by Pioneer	Iowa Speedway	Newton, Iowa	May 22
13	Top Gear 300	Charlotte Motor Speedway	Concord, North Carolina	May 28
14	STP 300	Chicagoland Speedway	Joliet, Illinois	June 4
15	Alliance Truck Parts 250	Michigan International Speedway	Cambridge Township, Michigan	June 18
16	Bucyrus 200 presented by Menard's	Road America	Elkhart Lake, Wisconsin	June 25
17	Subway Jalapeño 250 powered by Coca-Cola	Daytona International Speedway	Daytona Beach, Florida	July 1
18	Feed the Children 300	Kentucky Speedway	Sparta, Kentucky	July 8
19	New England 200	New Hampshire Motor Speedway	Loudon, New Hampshire	July 16
20	Federated Auto Parts 300	Nashville Superspeedway	Lebanon, Tennessee	July 23
21	Kroger 200 benefiting Riley Hospital for Children	Lucas Oil Raceway	Brownsburg, Indiana	July 30
22	U.S. Cellular 250 presented by the Enlist Weed Control System	Iowa Speedway	Newton, Iowa	August 6
23	Zippo 200 at The Glen	Watkins Glen International	Watkins Glen, New York	August 13
24	NAPA Auto Parts 200 presented by Dodge	Circuit Gilles Villeneuve, Montreal	Montreal, Quebec, Canada	August 20
25	Food City 250	Bristol Motor Speedway	Bristol, Tennessee	August 26
26	Great Clips 300	Atlanta Motor Speedway	Hampton, Georgia	September 3
27	Virginia 529 College Savings 250	Richmond International Raceway	Richmond, Virginia	September 9
28	Dollar General 300 powered by Coca-Cola	Chicagoland Speedway	Joliet, Illinois	September 17
29	OneMain Financial 200	Dover International Speedway	Dover, Delaware	October 1
30	Kansas Lottery 300	Kansas Speedway	Kansas City, Kansas	October 8
31	Dollar General 300 Miles of Courage	Charlotte Motor Speedway	Concord, North Carolina	October 14
32	O'Reilly Auto Parts Challenge	Texas Motor Speedway	Fort Worth, Texas	November 5
33	WYPALL* 200 powered by Kimberly-Clark Professional	Phoenix International Raceway	Avondale, Arizona	November 12
34	Ford 300	Homestead-Miami Speedway	Homestead, Florida	November 19
Note:All times are when the race coverage begins, not when the pre-race shows begin. All ET times are P.M., unless noted.

=== Schedule changes ===
- Gateway International Raceway was removed from the schedule.
- Nashville Superspeedway's second race moved to late July.
- Iowa Speedway and Chicagoland Speedway received a second race date.
- Michigan International Speedway's race moved from August to June.
- Kentucky Speedway's race date moved to July.
- Phoenix International Raceway's spring race moves from April to February.
- The fall race at Auto Club Speedway was discontinued due to low sales and was replaced by the aforementioned Chicagoland June race.

== Changes ==
=== Rule changes ===
The 2011 series seen a rule change aimed at limiting the impact of drivers racing in multiple series. According to a story reported by NASCAR.com on January 11, 2011, drivers were allowed to earn points in only one of NASCAR's three national series in a given season. This is enforced on NASCAR's annual license application form, which now requires drivers to indicate the series championship for which they wish to compete. This had the effect of preventing full-time Cup drivers from competing for the Nationwide Series title, although they were still able to run in all Nationwide races. Ineligible drivers still accumulated owner points for team standings that determine the Owner's Championship and exemptions (top 30 full-time teams that have attempted every race are guaranteed to start the race). This and other changes were officially announced by NASCAR president and CEO Brian France on January 26.

France also announced major changes to the points system in all three national touring series. Effective during the season, the winner of each race received 43 points, with a one-point decrease for each successive finishing position (42 points for second, 41 for third, and so on). The race winner also received three bonus points, with single bonus points being awarded to all drivers who led a lap and to the driver who led the most laps. This means that a race winner was assured of either 47 or 48 points, while a second-place finisher earned at most 44.

The closed-loop fueling system previously introduced in the Truck Series, which eliminates the catch can man from the pit crew, debuted in all three national series.

The Car of Tomorrow was used for all races in 2011.

== Results and standings ==
=== Races ===
No.	Race	Pole position	Most laps led	Winning driver	Winning manufacturer	No.	Winning team
1	DRIVE4COPD 300	Clint Bowyer	Clint Bowyer	Tony Stewart	Chevrolet	4	Kevin Harvick, Inc.
2	Bashas' Supermarkets 200	Kyle Busch	Kyle Busch	Kyle Busch	Toyota	18	Joe Gibbs Racing
3	Sam's Town 300	Carl Edwards	Kyle Busch	Mark Martin	Chevrolet	32	Turner Motorsports
4	Scotts EZ Seed 300	Ricky Stenhouse Jr.	Kyle Busch	Kyle Busch	Toyota	18	Joe Gibbs Racing
5	Royal Purple 300	Carl Edwards	Kevin Harvick	Kyle Busch	Toyota	18	Joe Gibbs Racing
6	O'Reilly 300	Carl Edwards	Carl Edwards	Carl Edwards	Ford	60	Roush-Fenway Racing
7	Aaron's 312	Elliott Sadler	Trevor Bayne	Kyle Busch	Toyota	18	Joe Gibbs Racing
8	Nashville 300	Joey Logano	Carl Edwards	Carl Edwards	Ford	60	Roush-Fenway Racing
9	Bubba Burger 250	Carl Edwards	Denny Hamlin	Denny Hamlin	Toyota	20	Joe Gibbs Racing
10	Royal Purple 200	Kyle Busch	Kyle Busch	Kyle Busch	Toyota	18	Joe Gibbs Racing
11	5-hour Energy 200	Carl Edwards	Carl Edwards	Carl Edwards	Ford	60	Roush-Fenway Racing
12	Iowa John Deere Dealers 250	Drew Herring	Reed Sorenson	Ricky Stenhouse Jr.	Ford	6	Roush-Fenway Racing
13	Top Gear 300	Ricky Stenhouse Jr.	Carl Edwards	Matt Kenseth	Ford	16	Roush-Fenway Racing
14	STP 300	Aric Almirola	Carl Edwards	Justin Allgaier	Chevrolet	31	Turner Motorsports
15	Alliance Truck Parts 250	Paul Menard	Carl Edwards	Carl Edwards	Ford	60	Roush-Fenway Racing
16	Bucyrus 200	Michael McDowell	Michael McDowell	Reed Sorenson	Chevrolet	32	Turner Motorsports
17	Subway Jalapeño 250	Kevin Harvick	Elliott Sadler	Joey Logano	Toyota	20	Joe Gibbs Racing
18	Feed the Children 300	Elliott Sadler	Brad Keselowski	Brad Keselowski	Dodge	22	Penske Racing
19	New England 200	Brad Keselowski	Kevin Harvick	Kyle Busch	Toyota	18	Joe Gibbs Racing
20	Federated Auto Parts 300	Brad Keselowski	Carl Edwards	Carl Edwards	Ford	60	Roush-Fenway Racing
21	Kroger 200	Ricky Stenhouse Jr.	Ricky Stenhouse Jr.	Brad Keselowski	Dodge	22	Penske Racing
22	U.S. Cellular 250	Elliott Sadler	Carl Edwards	Ricky Stenhouse Jr.	Ford	6	Roush-Fenway Racing
23	Zippo 200 at The Glen	Kurt Busch	Kyle Busch	Kurt Busch	Dodge	22	Penske Racing
24	NAPA Auto Parts 200	Jacques Villeneuve	Jacques Villeneuve	Marcos Ambrose	Ford	9	Richard Petty Motorsports
25	Food City 250	Kyle Busch	Kyle Busch	Kyle Busch	Toyota	18	Joe Gibbs Racing
26	Great Clips 300	Carl Edwards	Carl Edwards	Carl Edwards	Ford	60	Roush-Fenway Racing
27	Virginia 529 College Savings 250	Brad Keselowski	Carl Edwards	Kyle Busch	Toyota	18	Joe Gibbs Racing
28	Dollar General 300	Brian Scott	Brad Keselowski	Brad Keselowski	Dodge	22	Penske Racing
29	OneMain Financial 200	Elliott Sadler	Carl Edwards	Carl Edwards	Ford	60	Roush-Fenway Racing
30	Kansas Lottery 300	Carl Edwards	Brad Keselowski	Brad Keselowski	Dodge	22	Penske Racing
31	Dollar General 300 Miles of Courage	Paul Menard	Brad Keselowski	Carl Edwards	Ford	60	Roush-Fenway Racing
32	O'Reilly Auto Parts Challenge	Elliott Sadler	Carl Edwards	Trevor Bayne	Ford	16	Roush-Fenway Racing
33	WYPALL 200	Aric Almirola	Ricky Stenhouse Jr.	Sam Hornish Jr.	Dodge	12	Penske Racing
34	Ford 300	Brad Keselowski	Carl Edwards	Brad Keselowski	Dodge	22	Penske Racing

=== Drivers' standings ===
(key) Bold - Pole position awarded by time. Italics - Pole position set by final practice results. * – Most laps led.

Pos	Driver	DAY	PHO	LVS	BRI	CAL	TEX	TAL	NSH	RCH	DAR	DOV	IOW	CLT	CHI	MCH	ROA	DAY	KEN	NHA	NSH	LOR	IOW	GLN	CGV	BRI	ATL	RCH	CHI	DOV	KAN	CLT	TEX	PHO	HOM	Points
1	Ricky Stenhouse Jr.	8	7	8	**14**	4	8	38	5	21	10	4	1	**4**	14	2	8	27	9	4	2	**3***	1	15	26	11	3	3	8	5	5	9	6	5*	2	1222
2	Elliott Sadler	38	12	12	4	5	5	**5**	13	4	3	6	5	10	11	8	4	8	**5**	12	30	16	**3**	10	10	8	10	6	6	**14**	3	4	**9**	27	6	1177
3	Justin Allgaier	27	8	2	15	12	6	7	11	3	4	29	8	13	1	13	19	5	19	10	4	27	29	12	8	15	6	9	14	10	11	7	14	9	13	1105
4	Aric Almirola	19	13	15	10	9	12	8	10	14	28	9	17	9	4	15	22	9	20	5	5	4	5	8	20	5	8	7	4	15	12	15	19	**25**	8	1095
5	Reed Sorenson	5	5	11	34	14	7	10	8	12	8	3	4*	5	6	11	1	3	17	15	8	9	6	13	25	12	32	8	10	7	26	32	16	35	25	1062
6	Jason Leffler	6	11	9	8	11	15	15	15	10	9	11	33	21	5	10	20	2	13	30	18	6	13	18	9	7	9	29	12	19	13	11	15	26	12	1028
7	Kenny Wallace	28	10	10	17	15	20	25	12	13	11	7	6	20	7	20	28	7	6	6	10	12	7	32	16	36	19	5	17	16	19	16	13	17	33	963
8	Brian Scott	34	9	14	12	13	10	11	22	15	29	30	27	8	17	17	16	12	15	17	17	15	14	14	12	10	12	32	**3**	11	17	5	12	41	9	947
9	Michael Annett	39	19	13	24	18	18	19	19	16	31	20	13	14	9	19	7	6	7	7	14	29	12	19	18	6	20	11	16	12	16	17	20	10	19	944
10	Steve Wallace	20	30	16	11	27	17	32	17	11	5	16	11	7	12	14	26	11	21	9	11	30	8	16	4	14	13	16	18	20	20	13	18	29	34	921
11	Trevor Bayne	10	31	5	19	6	13	6*	6						3	5	31	22	11	13	9	28	25	9	23	13	33	28	11	6	9	3	1	6	11	893
12	Mike Bliss	13	20	17	26	19	19	35	31	18	30	15	18	18	22	23	15	20	24	14	24	11	18	22	15	18	15	12	15	9	22	20	23	31	17	827
13	Mike Wallace	37	26	21	32	24	22	17	18	33	15	10	19	25	16	22	5	15	16	27	19	17	31	20	17	26	16	15	20	29	24	22	32	16	20	777
14	Joe Nemechek	15	15	23	21	39	24	3		19	12	19	16	29	21	21		26	12	11		7	16	11	21	21	18	10		30	21	37	21	12	16	755
15	Jeremy Clements	16	22	27	16	35	21	24	23	23	26	24	14	26	29	26	32	32	31	19	21	18	17	24	39	32	14	14	21	18	23	29	26	24	18	696
16	Josh Wise	31	18	38	18	16	14	31	9	6	14	17	29	17	26	16	13	24			20	19	4	28	29	16	22	33	31	33	33	14	36	DNQ	39	672
17	Timmy Hill **(R)**		29	24	29	32	28	14	33	26	19	22	30	23	15	27	11	23	26	23	22	23	21	31	22	22	36	17	22	22	34	21	33	18	21	655
18	Blake Koch **(R)**		27		30	33	25	16	25	27	18	43	21	34	27	25	14	28	22	18	27	20	28	29	38	23	23	27	27	21	25	18	22	14	23	610
19	Eric McClure	33	25	20	25	21	31	26	32	32	36	25	23	28	18	29	27	37	27	20	23	21	26	35	36	27	28	30	25	24	31	31	24	19	29	572
20	Derrike Cope	25	23	25	23	31	32	27	30	29	24	27		30	23	28	17	29	25	31	25	22	30	30	35	25	24	21	32	26	30	24	30	32	30	559
21	Morgan Shepherd	26	33	18	31	23	37	30	28	28	22	26	20	24	25	34	35	38	34	21	32	32	32	34	42	34	25	24	28	25	27	25	28	28	43	504
22	Ryan Truex **(R)**		14	19	20	17			16	8	25	18	34		20												11	4	13	8	10	34^{1}		8		459
23	Sam Hornish Jr.	36					16	13		7				12		24					6		24						5			12	7	1	7	411
24	Robert Richardson Jr.	32	24	22	37	29	26	28	34	20			22	36	32	31		31	33				23				26	22	29			30	25	22	22	377
25	Scott Wimmer	35	16	33	22	34	33	12	21	24	38	35	15		19		39^{1}			42	13	39	15			24			30	41						340
26	Danica Patrick	14	17	4	33										10			10							24			18			15		11	21	32	321
27	Kevin Lepage	41	37	37	Wth	28	39			34	21	38		33	28			33	29	24	28					31	30	23		27	28	27		20	35	298
28	Dennis Setzer					36^{1}	38	29	37	38	23	28	25	32	35	43	18	35	43	32	34	34	33			35	34	39^{1}	41^{1}		DNQ	DNQ	DNQ			218
29	Jennifer Jo Cobb **(R)**	DNQ	32	31	QL	38	29	37			32	37	26	31		32	29	36	32	35	29	42	33			DNQ	29	DNQ	DNQ		DNQ			DNQ	DNQ	202
30	Charles Lewandoski **(R)**		21	40^{1}		25				31		42	41	DNQ	24	30	37	40	28	22	41	40	22							38	40	33				194
31	Carl Long		36	32	28	41	42	42	40	35	33	34	35	39	31	35	36	42	DNQ	36	33		40			DNQ	41	37	37	34	37	DNQ	37	DNQ		187
32	Tim Andrews			41		30	36	41	36	36	35	36	39^{1}	38	34	40	41	Wth	38	41	39	31	41	DNQ		39	39	38	DNQ	40	DNQ	38	40	42		146
33	J. R. Fitzpatrick	42				20			27			21					10							38	5											145
34	Danny Efland							21			16	23		19		33		30	DNQ	40	26															144
35	Drew Herring												12								7	8	11													139
36	Kevin Conway			43^{2}		22^{2}			24								24	25							QL	29			24			36			26	120
37	Matt Carter						41		39	41	39	Wth			37	36					37^{1}		35			41	17	35	34	32	35	DNQ	DNQ	39	40	119
38	Jeff Green	40		42	38	37	43	43	42	40	34	41		43	40	41	38	43	37		35	33	43	43	43	43	37	36		43	41	43	42	34	DNQ	118
39	Ron Fellows																2							7	11											114
40	Scott Riggs										13					37			36^{1}							37	38	41	36	31	36	39	27		37	112
41	Mikey Kile								29						33					16	15		19													108
42	Johnny Chapman								43	39	37	Wth	36		38				39	38	36	37	38			DNQ	43	34	38	35	38	40	DNQ	40	DNQ	99
43	Joey Gase																						20						23		29	26	29			93
44	Shelby Howard	22	28	29	27		30																													84
45	Tim Schendel				36		35		35				42				25					24	27													84
46	Chase Miller												40	DNQ	41	DNQ	40	DNQ	41	39	31	41	39	DNQ	DNQ	40	40	42	40	39	39	DNQ	39	38	38	81
47	Kelly Bires	43	38	35	43					30				42	8															37						77
48	Donnie Neuenberger	23		26				20				33																								74
49	Andrew Ranger																6			28				37	41										36	72
50	Alex Kennedy					40						32					21							23	33											71
51	Mike Harmon					43		40	38	37	41	Wth	37	40	39			41	40	37	38	38	36				DNQ									71
52	Jacques Villeneuve																3								**27***											61
53	Mark Green																				40	35	37	40		38	42	40	35	36	DNQ	DNQ	DNQ	36	DNQ	61
54	Luis Martinez Jr.												31												19			25								57
55	Angela Cope												28							25									DNQ		32	35				56
56	Fain Skinner																					26				30		DNQ		23					42	55
57	Chris Buescher									17	17																									54
58	Tim George Jr.							36										21						21	DNQ											54
59	Scott Speed																								6							41	43	37	41	53
60	Casey Roderick																							25				DNQ		28		DNQ			27	52
61	Jason Bowles																34							36	13											49
62	Kyle Kelley																							26	14											48
63	Danny O'Quinn Jr.						27		26												42^{1}	36							39		DNQ					48
64	Alex Tagliani																								2											43
65	Landon Cassill	3																																		41
66	Matt Frahm																			26		25												43		38
67	T. J. Duke																																	23	28	37
68	Daryl Harr		35	39									24																					DNQ		34
69	Brett Rowe	DNQ	39	36	40	42	DNQ					40	43		42	DNQ	42				DNQ				DNQ											28
70	Bobby Santos III	17																																		27
71	John Jackson										40^{1}			37					42							DNQ	31	DNQ								22
72	Patrick Sheltra	24																																		20
73	Louis-Philippe Dumoulin																								28											16
74	Benny Gordon																									28										16
75	D. J. Kennington																								40									33		15
76	Doug Harrington																30																			14
77	Maryeve Dufault																								30											14
78	David Green										42^{1}			41						33																14
79	Kevin Swindell											31																								13
80	Stanton Barrett																																		31	13
81	Brad Teague				42							39	38																							13
82	Patrick Carpentier																								32											12
83	Willie Allen				35				41																											12
84	Billy Johnson																33								QL											11
85	Will Kimmel																		35																	9
86	Andy Ponstein															38																				6
87	Dan Clarke																							39												5
88	Chris Lawson				41																															3
	Amber Cope												32^{1}																							0
	Marc Davis																				43^{1}									DNQ						0
	James Hylton										43^{1}																									0
	Jake Crum																											DNQ							DNQ	0
	Jean-François Dumoulin																								DNQ											0
	Chad Finley															Wth																				0
	Jeremy Petty																														Wth					0
	Michel Jourdain Jr.																								QL											0
	Owen Kelly																								QL											0
Ineligible for Nationwide championship points
Pos	Driver	DAY	PHO	LVS	BRI	CAL	TEX	TAL	NSH	RCH	DAR	DOV	IOW	CLT	CHI	MCH	ROA	DAY	KEN	NHA	NSH	LOR	IOW	GLN	CGV	BRI	ATL	RCH	CHI	DOV	KAN	CAL	TEX	PHO	HOM	Points
	Carl Edwards	29	2	**6**	7	**2**	**1***	18	1*	**25**	20	1*	2	2*	2*	1*		14	8	34	1*	5	2*	5	7	4	**1***	2*	2	1*	**2**	1	3*	3	3*	
	Kyle Busch	7	**1***	30*	1*	1	34	1	2		1*	2		3		3		4	3	1				4*		**1***	2	1				2	EX			
	Brad Keselowski	30	34	3	9	10	2	4	3	5	27	12	3	6	30	9		17	1*	**8**	**12**	1					7	**19**	1*	2	1*	6*	5	2	**1**	
	Joey Logano	12	6		5	7	4	2	**4**			13		11		6		1	10	29				3		2			19	13	7	19	8	4	10	
	Denny Hamlin			7						1*	2																						2		5	
	Mark Martin			1		8										7			14																	
	Tony Stewart	1																13																		
	Matt Kenseth													1																						
	Kurt Busch																							**1**												
	Marcos Ambrose																								1											
	Kevin Harvick		3	28	6	3*		39						16	13			**18**	2	2*							4	20			6					
	Clint Bowyer	**2***						22			6	14						34								3				3			4	7	4	
	Kasey Kahne	11			2		11				7			22					4	3						19	5		33	4		28				
	Paul Menard						3			2						**4**								6					9		4	**8**				
	James Buescher				13			23		22		8	9									2		17							18		17	30	14	
	Jimmie Johnson																							2												
	Dale Earnhardt Jr.	4			3		9																													
	Michael McDowell												7				**12***					10	9		3											
	Austin Dillon								7				10								3	14														
	Ryan Newman		4																																	
	David Reutimann						9		14			5				18			18							20										
	Jamie McMurray							34										16									21	31	7	17						
	Brian Vickers																														8	10	10			
	David Stremme								20	9						12			23		16	13				17		13	26		14		34	11	15	
	Ricky Carmichael																9	39										26						15		
	Michael Waltrip	9						33																												
	Parker Kligerman																									9										
	David Mayhew																						10													
	Ron Hornaday Jr.																																	13		
	Cole Whitt													15																						
	Todd Bodine	18																																		
	Jeffrey Earnhardt													35				19																		
	David Starr	21					23																			33										
	Nelson Piquet Jr.																																		24	
	T. J. Bell																							42		DNQ	27	DNQ	43	42	42	23	41		DNQ	
	Max Papis																23																			
	Tony Raines					26										42														DNQ						
	Tomy Drissi																							27	34											
	Kimi Räikkönen													27																						
	Jamie Dick																		30				34										31			
	Robby Gordon																								31											
	J. J. Yeley			34	39		40									39								41		DNQ			42		43		38			
	Clay Greenfield																										35									
	David Ragan																																35			
	Rick Crawford														36																					
	Boris Said																								37											
	Justin Marks		40																																	
	Brian Keselowski																						42	DNQ		42	DNQ	43	DNQ							
	Erik Darnell																															42	DNQ			
	Chris Cook																							QL	QL											
	Brian Simo																							DNQ												
Pos	Driver	DAY	PHO	LVS	BRI	CAL	TEX	TAL	NSH	RCH	DAR	DOV	IOW	CLT	CHI	MCH	ROA	DAY	KEN	NHA	NSH	LOR	IOW	GLN	CGV	BRI	ATL	RCH	CHI	DOV	KAN	CAL	TEX	PHO	HOM	Points

- ^{1} – Post entry, driver and owner did not score points.
- ^{2} – Conway originally registered for Sprint Cup points, but switched to Nationwide at Nashville.
- Kyle Busch was suspended from competing in the second Texas race due to crashing out championship contender Ron Hornaday Jr. during a caution at the 2011 WinStar World Casino 350K earlier that weekend. He was replaced by Denny Hamlin.

=== Manufacturer ===
Pos	Manufacturer	Wins	Points
1	Ford	13	**212**
2	Toyota	10	**194**
3	Chevrolet	4	**174**
4	Dodge	7	**168**

== See also ==
- 2011 NASCAR Sprint Cup Series
- 2011 NASCAR Camping World Truck Series
- 2011 ARCA Racing Series
- 2011 NASCAR Whelen Modified Tour
- 2011 NASCAR Whelen Southern Modified Tour
- 2011 NASCAR Canadian Tire Series
- 2011 NASCAR Corona Series
- 2011 NASCAR Stock V6 Series
