= Matt Carter (racing driver) =

American racing driver (born 1981)

- Born: Matthew Aaron Carter; May 13, 1981 (age 45); Denver, North Carolina, U.S.
- Achievements: 2003 Hickory Motor Speedway track champion
- Awards: 2004 Hooters Pro Cup Series Rookie of the Year; 2008 ARCA RE/MAX Series Rookie of the Year

NASCAR O'Reilly Auto Parts Series career
- 46 races run over 6 years
- 2014 position: 71st
- Best finish: 37th (2011)
- First race: 2007 Sam's Town 250 (Memphis)
- Last race: 2014 Ollie's Bargain Outlet 250 (Michigan)
Wins	Top tens	Poles
0	0	0

NASCAR FedEx Freight Truck Series career
- 1 race run over 1 year
- Best finish: 100th (2003)
- First race: 2003 Advance Auto Parts 250 (Martinsville)
Wins	Top tens	Poles
0	0	0
- Statistics up to date as of June 14, 2014.

Matthew Aaron Carter (born May 13, 1981) is an American stock car racing driver and the son of former NASCAR Sprint Cup Series car owner Travis Carter.

== Early career ==
Before moving on to ARCA and NASCAR, Carter ran in the USAR Hooters Pro Cup Series, where he was named Rookie of the Year in 2004. He scored one win in the series, coming at Iowa Speedway in September 2007.

== ARCA ==
Carter made his debut in the series in 2008. He replaced Frank Kimmel in the No. 46 Stine Seed Ford for Larry Clement and made a run for the championship. He won his first career race at Toledo Speedway after starting 13th. Carted ended the year third in points, earning one win and fourteen top-tens. He also earned Rookie of the Year honors. In 2009, Carter only ran his two races as the No. 46 team cut back its schedule. His best finish was 16th at Iowa Speedway.

== NASCAR ==
Carter's only career Camping World Truck Series start came in 2003 at Martinsville Speedway. Driving the No. 96 HeavyTruckDealers.com Dodge for Carl Long, he finished 17th after starting 14th.

Carter made his then-NASCAR Busch Series debut in 2007 at Memphis Motorsports Park. Driving the No. 40 Dodge for Specialty Racing, he started 31st and finished 39th after a crash midway through the race.

Carter returned to the Nationwide Series and the team in 2009, replacing Brandon Whitt in the No. 61 Ford at New Hampshire. In 15 starts, Carter earned three top-20 finishes, including a career-best of 12th at Bristol Motor Speedway. After the Dollar General 300, he left the team, citing increased frustration with the direction of the team. He was replaced by Kenny Hendrick and Jason Bowles. Carter returned to the Nationwide Series in 2011, driving primarily for start and park operation Fleur-de-lis Motorsports.

Carter made his first start of the 2012 season in the Nationwide Series at Dover International Speedway in June for Rick Ware Racing.

In 2014, Carter joined JGL Racing.

== Motorsports career results ==
=== NASCAR ===
(key) (Bold – Pole position awarded by qualifying time. Italics – Pole position earned by points standings or practice time. * – Most laps led.)

==== Nationwide Series ====
NASCAR Nationwide Series results
Year	Team	No.	Make	1	2	3	4	5	6	7	8	9	10	11	12	13	14	15	16	17	18	19	20	21	22	23	24	25	26	27	28	29	30	31	32	33	34	35	NNSC	Pts	Ref
2007	Specialty Racing	40	Ford	DAY	CAL	MXC	LVS	ATL	BRI	NSH	TEX	PHO	TAL	RCH	DAR	CLT	DOV	NSH	KEN	MLW	NHA	DAY	CHI	GTY	IRP	CGV	GLN	MCH	BRI	CAL	RCH	DOV	KAN	CLT	MEM; 39	TEX	PHO	HOM	149th	46	
2009	Specialty Racing	61	Ford	DAY	CAL	LVS	BRI	TEX	NSH	PHO	TAL	RCH	DAR	CLT	DOV	NSH	KEN	MLW	NHA; 24	DAY; 15	CHI; 32	GTY; 19	IRP; 30	IOW; 21	GLN; 36	MCH; 26	BRI; 12	CGV	ATL; 25	RCH; 33	DOV; 26	KAN; 27	CAL; 25	CLT; 29	MEM	TEX	PHO	HOM	39th	1305	
2010	Specialty Racing	61	Ford	DAY	CAL	LVS	BRI	NSH	PHO	TEX	TAL	RCH	DAR	DOV	CLT	NSH; 42	KEN; 42	ROA	NHA	DAY	CHI	GTY	IRP	IOW															125th	74	
2010	MacDonald Motorsports	82	Dodge																						GLN; 43	MCH	BRI	CGV	ATL	RCH	DOV; DNQ	KAN	CAL	CLT	GTY	TEX	PHO	HOM	125th	74	
2011	Fleur-de-Lis Motorsports	68	Chevy	DAY	PHO	LVS	BRI	CAL	TEX; 41	TAL	NSH; 39	RCH; 41	DAR; 39	DOV; Wth	IOW	CLT	CHI; 37	MCH; 36	ROA	DAY	KEN	NHA																	37th	119	
2011	Rick Ware Racing	71	Ford																				NSH; 37	IRP				BRI; 41		RCH; 35	CHI; 34	DOV; 32	KAN; 35	CLT; DNQ					37th	119	
2011	Rick Ware Racing	41	Chevy																						IOW; 35	GLN	CGV												37th	119	
2011	Go Green Racing	39	Ford																										ATL; 17										37th	119	
2011	Rick Ware Racing	71	Chevy																																TEX; DNQ	PHO; 39	HOM; 40		37th	119	
2012	NEMCO Motorsports	87	Toyota	DAY	PHO	LVS	BRI	CAL	TEX	RCH	TAL	DAR	IOW; QL^{†}	CLT																									62nd	54	
2012	Rick Ware Racing	71	Chevy												DOV; 35	MCH	ROA	KEN	DAY		CHI; 35	IND	IOW	GLN	CGV	BRI						CLT; DNQ	KAN	TEX	PHO	HOM			62nd	54	
2012	Rick Ware Racing	75	Chevy																	NHA; 37									CHI; 38	KEN; 40	DOV								62nd	54	
2012	Go Green Racing	39	Ford																								ATL; 30												62nd	54	
2012	Rick Ware Racing	15	Chevy																									RCH; 39											62nd	54	
2014	JGL Racing	93	Dodge	DAY; DNQ	PHO	LVS																																	71st	15	
2014	MBM Motorsports	13	Toyota				BRI; 37	CAL	TEX	DAR; 36	RCH	TAL	IOW	CLT	DOV																								71st	15	
2014	MBM Motorsports	72	Chevy													MCH; 37	ROA	KEN	DAY	NHA	CHI	IND	IOW	GLN	MOH	BRI	ATL	RCH	CHI	KEN	DOV	KAN	CLT; DNQ	TEX	PHO	HOM			71st	15	
^{†} - Qualified for Joe Nemechek .

==== Craftsman Truck Series ====
NASCAR Craftsman Truck Series results
Year	Team	No.	Make	1	2	3	4	5	6	7	8	9	10	11	12	13	14	15	16	17	18	19	20	21	22	23	24	25	NCTC	Pts	Ref
2003	Carl Long Racing	96	Dodge	DAY	DAR	MMR	MAR	CLT	DOV	TEX	MEM	MLW	KAN	KEN	GTW	MCH	IRP	NSH	BRI	RCH	NHA	CAL	LVS	SBO	TEX	MAR; 17	PHO	HOM	100th	112	

=== ARCA Re/Max Series ===
(key) (Bold – Pole position awarded by qualifying time. Italics – Pole position earned by points standings or practice time. * – Most laps led.)

ARCA Re/Max Series results
Year	Team	No.	Make	1	2	3	4	5	6	7	8	9	10	11	12	13	14	15	16	17	18	19	20	21	22	ARMC	Pts	Ref
2003	BelCar Motorsports	9	Ford	DAY	ATL	NSH	SLM	TOL	KEN	CLT	BLN	KAN	MCH	LER	POC	POC	NSH	ISF	WIN	DSF	CHI	SLM	TAL	CLT	SBO; DNQ	N/A	0	
2008	Clement Racing	46	Ford	DAY; 13	SLM; 3	IOW; 4*	KAN; 11	CAR; 8	KEN; 29	**TOL**; 1*	POC; 12	MCH; 12	CAY; 6	KEN; 7	BLN; 5	POC; 4	NSH; 9	ISF; 4	DSF; 6	CHI; 12	SLM; 2	NJM; 30	TAL; 10	TOL; 2		3rd	5175	
2009	Clement Racing	46	Ford	DAY; 28	SLM	CAR	TAL	KEN	TOL	POC	MCH	MFD	IOW; 16	KEN	BLN	POC	ISF	CHI	TOL	DSF	NJM	SLM	KAN	CAR		91st	240	
