= Luis Martinez Jr. =

American racing driver (born 1990)

- Born: February 15, 1990 (age 36); Long Beach, California, U.S.

NASCAR O'Reilly Auto Parts Series career
- 3 races run over 1 year
- Best finish: 54th (2011)
- First race: 2011 Iowa John Deere Dealers 250 (Iowa)
- Last race: 2011 Virginia 529 College Savings 250 (Richmond)
Wins	Top tens	Poles
0	0	0

Luis Martinez Jr. (born February 15, 1990) is an American professional stock car racing driver. He has raced in the NASCAR Nationwide Series.

== Racing career ==
Martinez started to compete in the NASCAR K&N Pro Series West in 2008. He won the series' Rookie of the Year award in 2010, driving for Sunrise Ford Racing. In 2011, he won his first race at Portland International Raceway after David Mayhew overdrove the last corner on the last lap of the race.

== Motorsports career results ==
=== NASCAR ===
(key) (Bold – Pole position awarded by qualifying time. Italics – Pole position earned by points standings or practice time. * – Most laps led.)

==== Nationwide Series ====
NASCAR Nationwide Series results
Year	Team	No.	Make	1	2	3	4	5	6	7	8	9	10	11	12	13	14	15	16	17	18	19	20	21	22	23	24	25	26	27	28	29	30	31	32	33	34	NNSC	Pts	Ref
2011	Go Green Racing	39	Ford	DAY	PHO	LVS	BRI	CAL	TEX	TAL	NSH	RCH	DAR	DOV	IOW; 31	CLT	CHI	MCH	ROA	DAY	KEN	NHA	NSH	IRP	IOW	GLN	CGV; 19	BRI	ATL	RCH; 25	CHI	DOV	KAN	CLT	TEX	PHO	HOM	54th	57	

==== K&N Pro Series West ====
NASCAR K&N Pro Series West results
Year	Team	No.	Make	1	2	3	4	5	6	7	8	9	10	11	12	13	14	NKNPSWC	Pts	Ref
2008	Richard Childress Racing with Jim Offenbach	31	Chevy	AAS	PHO	CTS	IOW	CNS	SON	IRW	DCS	EVG	MMP; 22	IRW; 18	AMP	AAS		41st	206	
2010	Sunrise Ford Racing	6	Ford	AAS; 5	PHO; 17	IOW; 9	DCS; 19	SON; 7	IRW; 9	PIR; 5	MRP; 9	**CNS**; 3	MMP; 19	AAS; 6	PHO; 28			7th	1593	
2011	Sunrise Ford Racing	6	Ford	PHO; 12	AAS; 7	MMP; 6		LVS; 7	SON; 27	IRW; 13	EVG; 9	**PIR**; 1	CNS; 4	MRP; 11	SPO; 4	AAS; 4	PHO; 25	4th	1942	
2011	Sunrise Ford Racing	06	Ford				IOW; 7											4th	1942	
