= Fain Skinner =

American karting champion and stock car racing driver

- Born: February 21, 1985 (age 41); Live Oak, Florida, U.S.
- Achievements: 1999 World Karting Association National Champion; Four-time Florida Karting Association Champion
- Awards: 2003 FASCAR Sunbelt Super Series Rookie of the Year

NASCAR O'Reilly Auto Parts Series career
- 6 races run over 2 years
- 2011 position: 56th
- Best finish: 56th (2011)
- First race: 2011 Kroger 200 (IRP)
- Last race: 2012 NRA American Warrior 300 (Atlanta)
Wins	Top tens	Poles
0	0	0
- Statistics up to date as of September 1, 2012.

Fain Skinner (born February 21, 1985) is an American professional stock car racing driver who last competed in what is now the NASCAR Xfinity Series part-time in 2012. He has also made starts in the NASCAR K&N Pro Series East and the ARCA Racing Series.

== Racing career ==
Skinner began his racing career at the age of nine, competing in kart racing events; he would go on to score over one hundred wins in kart racing, and was named the 1999 National Champion of the World Karting Association, in addition to winning the Florida Karting Association championship four times.

Moving to competing in stock cars at the age of 15, Skinner established himself in late model racing; he raced in the FASCAR Sunbelt Super Series, a Florida late model racing circuit, from 2003–2005, winning the series' Rookie of the Year award in 2003.

Skinner made his debut in national NASCAR competition in 2011, competing in four races in the Nationwide Series. His debut was at the Kroger 200 at Lucas Oil Raceway at Indianapolis, competing for Rick Ware Racing, and finishing 26th; he would run three races later in the year for Go Green Racing, scoring a best finish of 23rd at Dover International Speedway in September.

In 2012, Skinner made his debut in the ARCA Racing Series, competing in the Lucas Oil Slick Mist 200 at Daytona International Speedway in the No. 39 Chevrolet owned by Mario Gosselin. Skinner ran a consistent race, but was collected in an accident on the final lap of the event, finishing 15th.

Skinner planned to compete in selected events in the NASCAR Camping World Truck Series late in the 2012 season, but his next major race in 2012 was at Bristol Motor Speedway in the Nationwide Series for Rick Ware Racing in August.

== Personal and business life ==
Skinner, who is unrelated to 1995 NASCAR SuperTruck Series presented by Craftsman champion Mike Skinner, is a third-generation resident of Suwannee County, Florida and is a graduate of Florida Gateway College. He and his wife Hannah have two sons. Skinner helps operate the family business, Skinner's Paint and Body Shop, in Live Oak, Florida as well as a Gym; in August 2012, he and his father Ronald received one of Suwannee County's first five liquor licenses.

== Motorsports career results ==
=== NASCAR ===
(key) (Bold – Pole position awarded by qualifying time. Italics – Pole position earned by points standings or practice time. * – Most laps led.)

==== Nationwide Series ====
NASCAR Nationwide Series results
Year	Team	No.	Make	1	2	3	4	5	6	7	8	9	10	11	12	13	14	15	16	17	18	19	20	21	22	23	24	25	26	27	28	29	30	31	32	33	34	NNSC	Pts	Ref
2011	Rick Ware Racing	41	Chevy	DAY	PHO	LVS	BRI	CAL	TEX	TAL	NSH	RCH	DAR	DOV	IOW	CLT	CHI	MCH	ROA	DAY	KEN	NHA	NSH	IRP; 26	IOW	GLN	CGV											56th	55	
2011	Go Green Racing	39	Ford																									BRI; 30	ATL			DOV; 23	KAN	CLT	TEX	PHO	HOM; 42	56th	55	
2011	Go Green Racing	04	Ford																											RCH; DNQ	CHI							56th	55	
2012	Rick Ware Racing	41	Ford	DAY	PHO	LVS	BRI	CAL	TEX	RCH	TAL	DAR	IOW	CLT	DOV	MCH	ROA	KEN	DAY	NHA	CHI	IND	IOW	GLN	CGV	BRI; 28	ATL; 37	RCH	CHI	KEN	DOV	CLT	KAN	TEX	PHO	HOM		66th	23	

==== K&N Pro Series East ====
NASCAR K&N Pro Series East results
Year	Team	No.	Make	1	2	3	4	5	6	7	8	9	10	11	12	NKNPSEC	Pts	Ref
2011	Lori Williams	12	Dodge	GRE	SBO	RCH	IOW	BGS	JFC	LGY	NHA	COL	GRE	NHA	DOV; 15	58th	118	

=== ARCA Racing Series ===
(key) (Bold – Pole position awarded by qualifying time. Italics – Pole position earned by points standings or practice time. * – Most laps led.)

ARCA Racing Series results
Year	Team	No.	Make	1	2	3	4	5	6	7	8	9	10	11	12	13	14	15	16	17	18	19	20	ARSC	Pts	Ref
2012	DGM Racing	39	Ford	DAY; 15	MOB	SLM	TAL	TOL	ELK	POC	MCH	WIN	NJE	IOW	CHI	IRP	POC	BLN	ISF	MAD	SLM	DSF	KAN	107th	155	
