= Go Green Racing =

Former American stock car racing team

- Owner: Archie St. Hilaire
- Base: Mooresville, North Carolina
- Series: NASCAR Xfinity Series
- Race drivers: TBA. TBA
- Manufacturer: Chevrolet
- Opened: 2009

Career
- Debut: Sprint Cup Series: 2012 Bojangles' Southern 500 (Darlington); Xfinity Series: 2009 Kroger On Track for the Cure 250 (Memphis)
- Latest race: Sprint Cup Series: 2013 Toyota/Save Mart 350 (Sonoma); Xfinity Series: 2018 Ford EcoBoost 300 (Homestead–Miami)
- Races competed: Total: 122; Sprint Cup Series: 7 Xfinity Series: 115
- Drivers' Championships: Total: 0 Sprint Cup Series: 0 Xfinity Series: 0
- Race victories: Total: 0 Sprint Cup Series: 0 Xfinity Series: 0
- Pole positions: Total: 0 Sprint Cup Series: 0 Xfinity Series: 0

Go Green Racing is an American professional stock car racing team that is currently on hiatus in the NASCAR Xfinity Series. The team debuted in NASCAR competition in 2009, competing in the Nationwide Series, before adding a part-time Sprint Cup Series team in 2012. The team, which raced with 14 different drivers in the 2011 season, is headquartered in Old Orchard Beach, Maine, but operates from a shop in Mooresville, North Carolina. In 2014, St. Hilaire closed down his Nationwide Series operation to merge the team into Go FAS Racing with Frank Stoddard. In 2018, the team returned to the Xfinity Series with driver Joey Gase, but parted ways with Gase at the end of the year.

== Xfinity Series ==
=== Car No. 35 history ===
On January 5, 2018, Go Green Racing announced that they would be returning to the Xfinity Series full time with Joey Gase. The number was announced as No. 35, and Sparks Energy as the primary sponsor. Go Green fielded cars out of the same shop as SS-Green Light Racing, although the two organizations remained separate. Gase ultimately finished 20th in the final point standings at season's end.

At the end of 2018, MBM Motorsports took over the No. 35 team with Gase still as the driver, and Go Green has been inactive ever since.

==== Car No. 35 results ====
NASCAR Xfinity Series results
Year	Driver	No.	Make	1	2	3	4	5	6	7	8	9	10	11	12	13	14	15	16	17	18	19	20	21	22	23	24	25	26	27	28	29	30	31	32	33	Owners	Pts
2018	Joey Gase	35	Chevy	DAY; 33	ATL; 26	LVS; 20	PHO; 24	CAL; 16	TEX; 20	BRI; 16	RCH; 22	TAL; 21	DOV; 20	CLT; 17	POC; 19	MCH; 39	IOW; 21	CHI; 22	DAY; 32	KEN; 33	NHA; 22	IOW; 17	GLN; 22	MOH; 24	BRI; 18	ROA; 19	DAR; 21	IND; 15	LVS; 15	RCH; 22	CLT; 23	DOV; 30	KAN; 15	TEX; 22	PHO; 22	HOM; 23	21st	495

=== Car No. 79 history ===
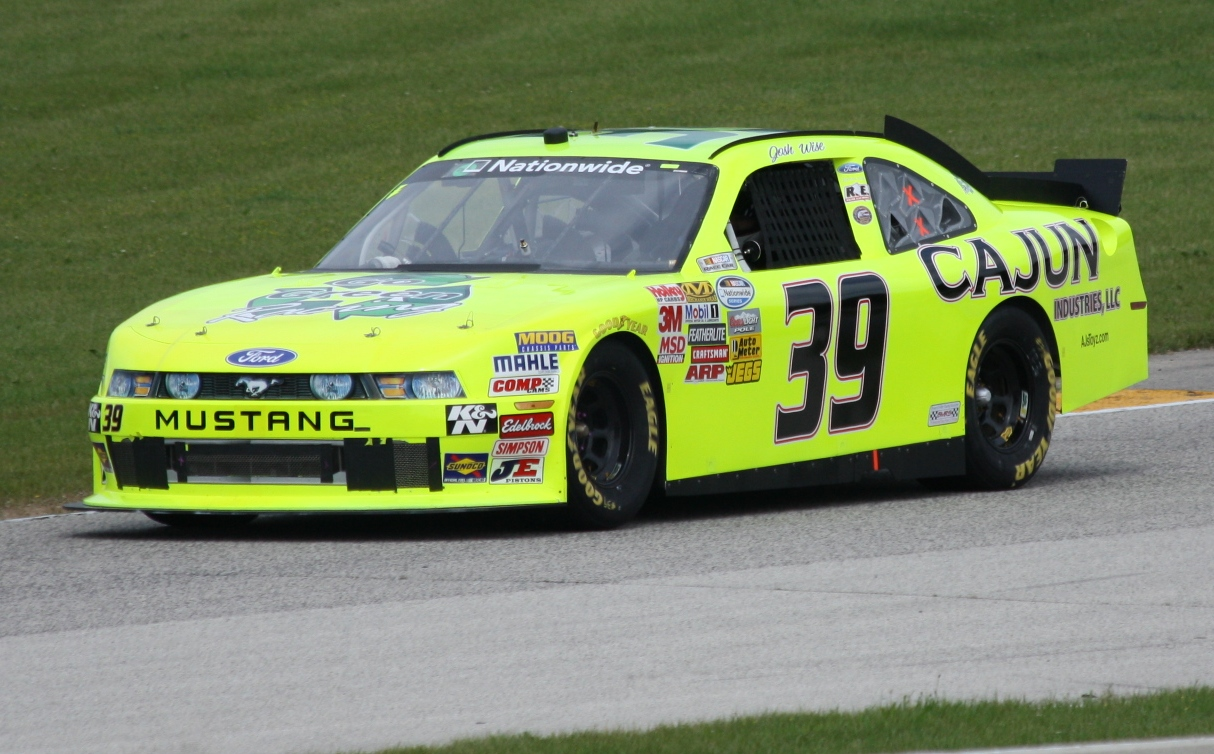
The No. 39 in 2011

Owned by Archie St. Hilaire, Go Green Racing was founded in 2009, making its debut in the Nationwide Series with the No. 39 Ford in the Kroger On Track for the Cure 250 at Memphis Motorsports Park with driver Eddie MacDonald, finishing 22nd. The team ran three races in 2010 with Charles Lewandoski and Sean Caisse driving, before running the full Nationwide Series schedule for the first time in 2011 with Josh Wise, Lewandoski, Danny O'Quinn, Jr., Danny Efland, Luis Martinez, Jr., Will Kimmel, Matt Frahm, Joey Gase, Casey Roderick, Fain Skinner, and Matt Carter all sharing time in the No. 39 car. The No. 39 posted a best finish of 13th, at Road America with Wise driving, and finished 26th in owner standings at the end of the 2011 season.

The No. 39 car started the 2012 season with Joey Gase as its regular driver, competing for Rookie of the Year in the Nationwide Series; however, a lack of funding meant that Gase was released from the ride after the fifth race of the year, with Bires and Frahm each running a race in the car before Josh Richards took over regular driving duties starting at Talladega Superspeedway. Grand-Am driver Matt Bell drove the car at Road America, Jeffrey Earnhardt drove the No. 39 as a Chevrolet at Indy and Charlotte, while Tim Andrews, Carter and Canadian driver Dexter Stacey finished out the season. For 2013, Earnhardt was drive the newly numbered 79 car full-time. However, the team later scaled back to a partial schedule. Earnhardt would leave for JD Motorsports at season's end, and Hilaire subsequently shut down the Nationwide program upon the team's merger with FAS Lane in the Cup Series.

==== Car No. 39/79 results ====
Year	Driver	No.	Make	1	2	3	4	5	6	7	8	9	10	11	12	13	14	15	16	17	18	19	20	21	22	23	24	25	26	27	28	29	30	31	32	33	34	35	Owners	Pts
2009	Eddie MacDonald	39	Ford	DAY	CAL	LVS	BRI	TEX	NSH	PHO	TAL	RCH	DAR	CLT	DOV	NSH	KEN	MLW	NHA	DAY	CHI	GTY	IRP	IOW	GLN	MCH	BRI	CGV	ATL	RCH	DOV	KAN	CAL	CLT	MEM; 22	TEX	PHO	HOM; DNQ	132nd	97
2010	Jason Bowles	39	Ford	DAY	CAL	LVS	BRI; DNQ	NSH	PHO	TEX	TAL	RCH	DAR																										N/A	N/A
2010	Danny O'Quinn Jr.	39	Ford											DOV; DNQ	CLT	NSH	KEN	ROA																					N/A	N/A
2010	Charles Lewandoski	39	Ford																NHA; 31	DAY	CHI	GTY	IRP	IOW	GLN	MCH													N/A	N/A
2010	Sean Caisse	39	Ford																								BRI; 34	CGV	ATL	RCH					GTY; 33	TEX	PHO	HOM; DNQ	N/A	N/A
2010	Alan Tardiff	39	Ford																												DOV; DNQ	KAN	CAL	CLT					N/A	N/A
2011	Josh Wise	39	Ford	DAY; 31	PHO; 18	LVS; 34	BRI; 18			TAL; 31							CHI; 26		ROA; 13	DAY; 24																			26th	604
2011	Charles Lewandoski	39	Ford					CAL; 25				RCH; 31																											26th	604
2011	Danny O'Quinn Jr.	39	Ford						TEX; 27		NSH; 26																												26th	604
2011	Danny Efland	39	Ford										DAR; 16	DOV; 23		CLT; 19		MCH; 33					NSH; 26																26th	604
2011	Luis Martinez Jr.	39	Ford												IOW; 31												CGV; 19			RCH; 25									26th	604
2011	Will Kimmel	39	Ford																		KEN; 35																		26th	604
2011	Matt Frahm	39	Ford																			NHA; 26		IRP; 25												PHO; 43			26th	604
2011	Joey Gase	39	Ford																						IOW; 20						CHI; 23		KAN; 29	CLT; 26	TEX; 29				26th	604
2011	Casey Roderick	39	Ford																							GLN; 25													26th	604
2011	Fain Skinner	39	Ford																									BRI; 30				DOV; 23					HOM; 42		26th	604
2011	Matt Carter	39	Ford																										ATL; 17										26th	604
2012	Joey Gase	39	Ford	DAY; 29	PHO; 25	LVS; 37	BRI; 36	CAL; 23															IOW; 32																31st	544
2012	Kelly Bires	39	Ford						TEX; 22																														31st	544
2012	Matt Frahm	39	Ford							RCH; 32																													31st	544
2012	Josh Richards	39	Ford								TAL; 30	DAR; 25	IOW; 34	CLT; 34	DOV; 22	MCH; 30	ROA; 31	KEN; 20	DAY; 16	NHA; 24	CHI; 20					BRI; 19				KEN; 21									31st	544
2012	Jeffrey Earnhardt	39	Ford																			IND; 21										CLT; 27							31st	544
2012	Matt Bell	39	Ford																					GLN; 36															31st	544
2012	Tim Andrews	39	Ford																						CGV; 17						DOV; 29			TEX; 35					31st	544
2012	Matt Carter	39	Ford																								ATL; 30												31st	544
2012	Dexter Stacey	39	Ford																									RCH; 27	CHI; 24				KAN; 27		PHO; 30	HOM; 43			31st	544
2013	Jeffrey Earnhardt	79	Ford	DAY; 22	PHO; 20	LVS; 26	BRI; 32		TEX; 22		TAL; 16			DOV; 21		MCH; 31	ROA; 26		DAY; 33	NHA; 25					MOH; 18			RCH; 28		KEN; 25			CLT; 30		PHO; 20				27th	600
2013	Paulie Harraka	79	Ford					CAL; 35																															27th	600
2013	Joey Gase	79	Ford							RCH; 30					IOW; 27																								27th	600
2013	Kyle Fowler	79	Ford									DAR; 34	CLT; 26								CHI; 26	IND; 20	IOW; 28			BRI; 29	ATL; 26												27th	600
2013	Bryan Silas	79	Ford															KEN; 26						GLN; 23								KAN; 23		TEX; 29		HOM; 22			27th	600
2013	Maryeve Dufault	79	Ford																										CHI; 31										27th	600
2013	T. J. Duke	79	Ford																												DOV; 25								27th	600

=== Car No. 04 history ===
The No. 04 Ford made its debut as Go Green's second car at the 5-hour Energy 200 at Dover International Speedway in the spring of 2011. Primarily running as a start and park car, Lewandoski, Kelly Bires, Efland, O'Quinn, Benny Gordon, Tim Andrews, and Roderick competed in the car during the year; The No. 04 car posted a best finish of 28th at Bristol Motor Speedway in August with Gordon driving, the only race the car completed all season, and finished 49th in the series owner standings.

For 2012, it was planned for Andrews to make semi-regular starts in the No. 04 car, sharing it with several other drivers; However it never ended up attempting any races.

==== Car No. 04 results ====
Year	Driver	No.	Make	1	2	3	4	5	6	7	8	9	10	11	12	13	14	15	16	17	18	19	20	21	22	23	24	25	26	27	28	29	30	31	32	33	34	Owners	Pts
2011	Charles Lewandoski	04	Ford	DAY	PHO	LVS	BRI	CAL	TEX	TAL	NSH	RCH	DAR	DOV; 42	IOW																							49th	73
2011	Kelly Bires	04	Ford													CLT; 42	CHI	MCH	ROA	DAY	KEN											DOV; 37						49th	73
2011	Danny Efland	04	Ford																			NHA; 40																49th	73
2011	Danny O'Quinn Jr.	04	Ford																				NSH; 42	IRP; 36	IOW	GLN	CGV				CHI; 39		KAN; DNQ					49th	73
2011	Benny Gordon	04	Ford																									BRI; 28	ATL									49th	73
2011	Fain Skinner	04	Ford																											RCH; DNQ								49th	73
2011	Tim Andrews	04	Ford																															CLT; 38	TEX; 40	PHO; 42		49th	73
2011	Casey Roderick	04	Ford																																		HOM; 27	49th	73

== Sprint Cup Series ==
=== Car No. 52 history ===
Paulie Harraka drove the No. 52 Ford at 2013 Sonoma, using Brian Keselowski Motorsports' owners points to make the field. Harraka crashed his car before the start of the race but the team was able to make repairs and finished 39th.

==== Car No. 52 results ====
Year	Driver	No.	Make	1	2	3	4	5	6	7	8	9	10	11	12	13	14	15	16	17	18	19	20	21	22	23	24	25	26	27	28	29	30	31	32	33	34	35	36	NSCC	Pts
2013	Paulie Harraka	52	Ford	DAY	PHO	LVS	BRI	CAL	MAR	TEX	KAN	RCH	TAL	DAR	CLT	DOV	POC	MCH	SON; 39	KEN	DAY	NHA	IND	POC	GLN	MCH	BRI	ATL	RCH	CHI	NHA	DOV	KAN	CLT	TAL	MAR	TEX	PHO	HOM	46th	17

=== Car No. 79 history ===
For the 2012 season, Go Green Racing added a part-time NASCAR Sprint Cup Series team to their racing efforts, with driver Tim Andrews being hired to drive and his father Paul Andrews acting as crew chief; they were the first father and son driver and crew chief combination in the series since 1987. The team planned to attempt 10 to 12 races over the course of the season. Andrews failed to qualify in the team's first effort at the STP 400 at Kansas Speedway; veteran Scott Speed was hired to drive the No. 79 Ford, qualifying for the Bojangles Southern 500 at Darlington Raceway for the team's first race, where he finished 42nd; at Dover later that spring, he qualified for the team's second straight race, only to be caught up in an early wreck and finish 43rd.

==== Car No. 79 results ====
Year	Driver	No.	Make	1	2	3	4	5	6	7	8	9	10	11	12	13	14	15	16	17	18	19	20	21	22	23	24	25	26	27	28	29	30	31	32	33	34	35	36	NSCC	Pts
2012	Tim Andrews	79	Ford	DAY	PHO	LVS	BRI	CAL	MAR	TEX	KAN; DNQ	RCH	TAL																											52nd	14
2012	Scott Speed	79	Ford											DAR; 42	CLT	DOV; 43	POC	MCH	SON	KEN	DAY																			52nd	14
2012	Kelly Bires	79	Ford																			NHA; 42					BRI; DNQ	ATL	RCH	CHI	NHA; 43	DOV; DNQ	TAL	CLT	KAN; 38	MAR	TEX; DNQ	PHO		52nd	14
2012	Mike Skinner	79	Ford																				IND; 42	POC	GLN	MCH														52nd	14
2012	Reed Sorenson	79	Ford																																				HOM; DNQ	52nd	14

=== Car No. 32 history ===
In late 2013, Go Green and FAS Lane Racing announced that they were entering into an alliance to jointly field the No. 32 in the Sprint Cup Series in 2014.

== K&N Pro Series East ==
Go Green Racing has also operated a racing team in the development series K&N Pro Series East; in 2012 they announced plans to have a "Young Guns" competition to select a Maine driver to drive the team's car at New Hampshire Motor Speedway in September, the selected driver was Austin Theriault. The team also regularly enters cars in the TD Bank 250 at Oxford Plains Speedway, considered by racers to be the premier auto race held in the state of Maine; Jeffrey Earnhardt and Kevin Lepage have driven for the team in the event.
