= Dollar General 300 =

Dollar General 300 may refer to two races:

- NASCAR O'Reilly Auto Parts Series at Charlotte Motor Speedway
- NASCAR O'Reilly Auto Parts Series at Chicagoland Speedway
