= 2012 NASCAR Nationwide Series =

American motorsport season

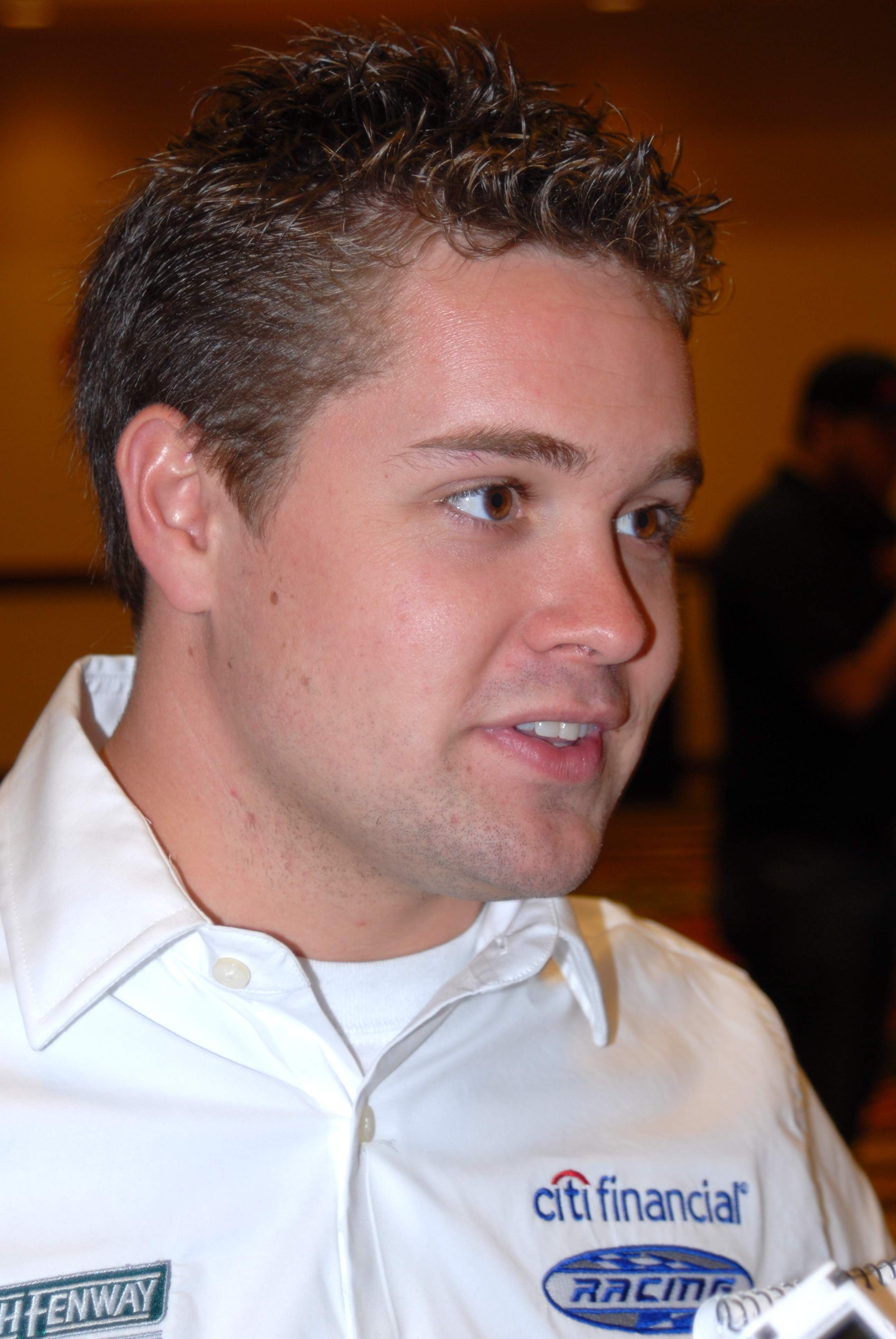
Ricky Stenhouse Jr., the 2012 Nationwide Series champion.

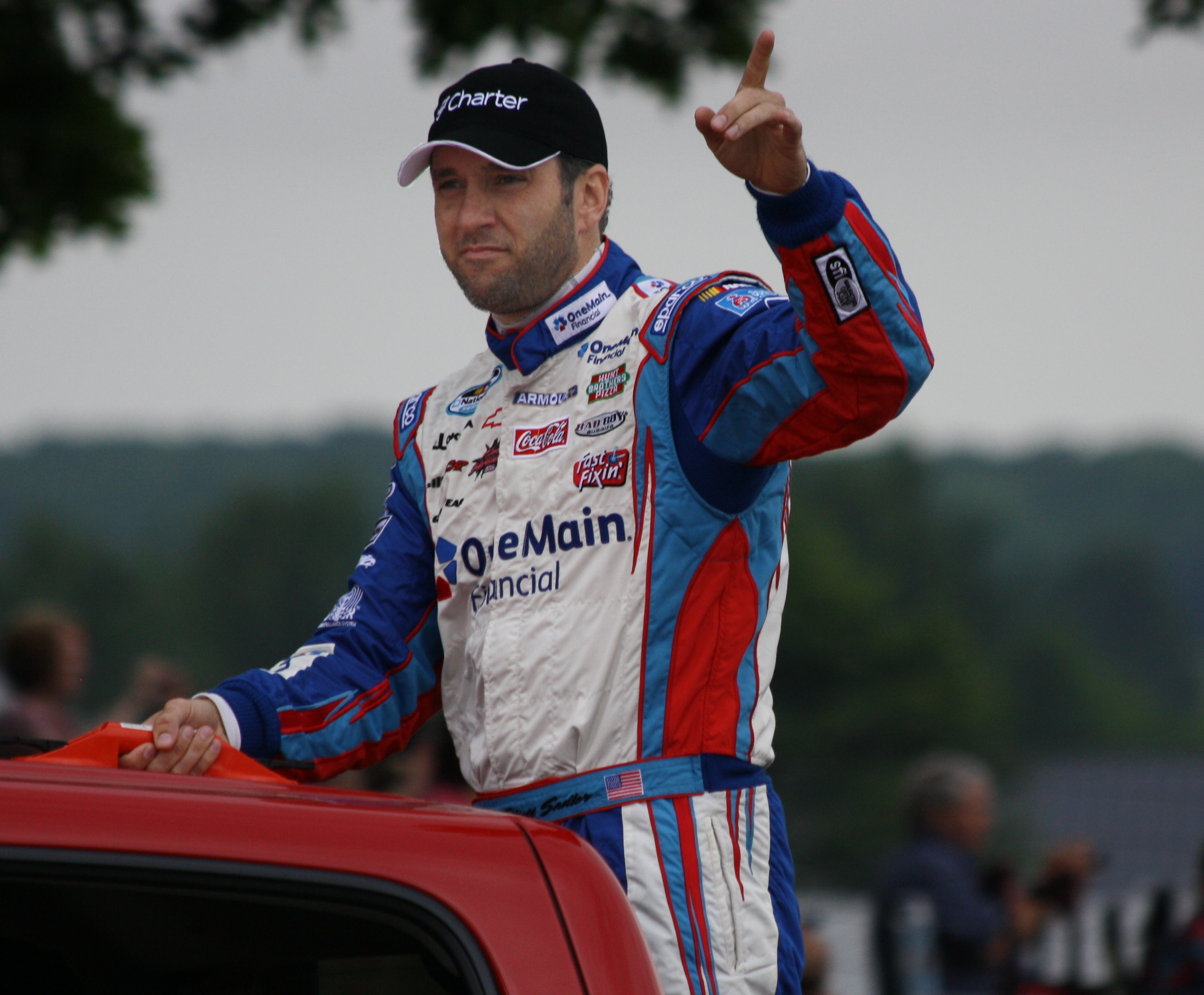
Elliott Sadler finished second behind Stenhouse in the championship by 23 points.

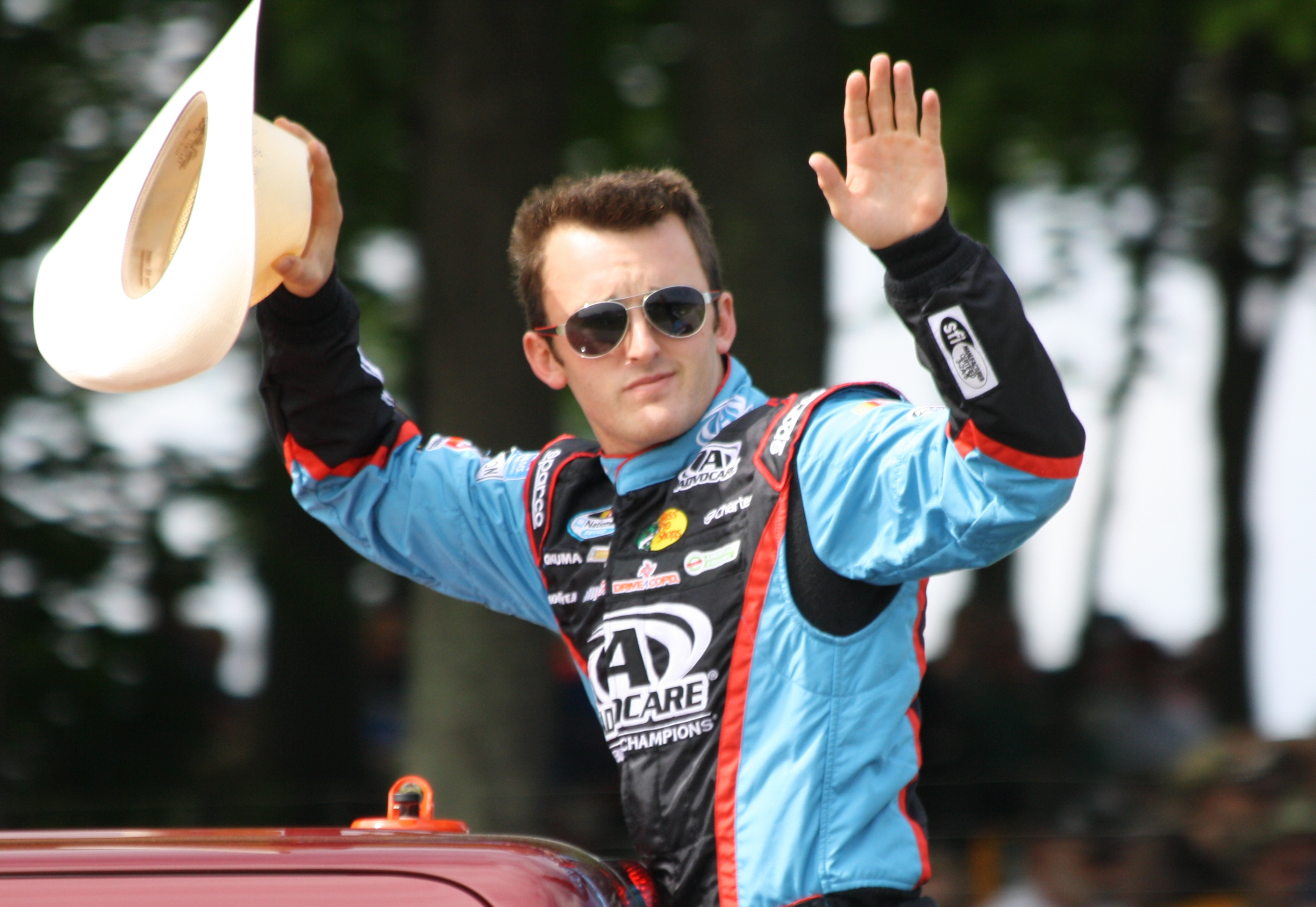
Austin Dillon finished third in the championship, 24 points behind Stenhouse. He also won the Rookie of the year title.

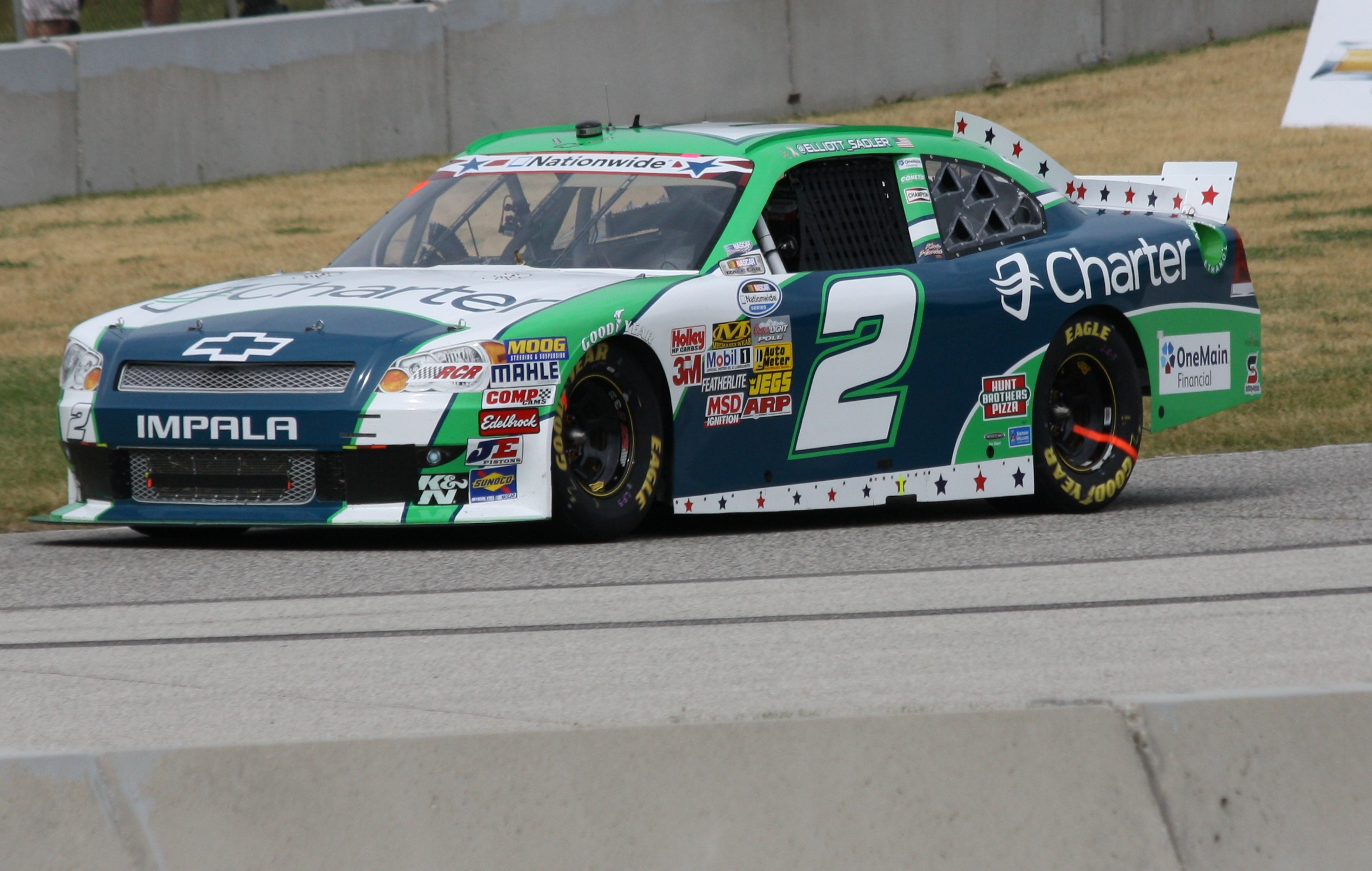
Chevy won the manufacturer's championship with 13 wins and 216 points.

The 2012 NASCAR Nationwide Series was the 31st season of the NASCAR Nationwide Series, the second-tier professional stock car racing series sanctioned by NASCAR in the United States. The season included thirty-three races, down from thirty-four, and began with the DRIVE4COPD 300 at Daytona International Speedway and ended with the Ford EcoBoost 300 at Homestead-Miami Speedway. Chevrolet won the Manufacturer's Championship. Joe Gibbs won the Owners' Championship with the No. 18 car, while Ricky Stenhouse Jr. of Roush Fenway Racing won the Drivers' championship with a sixth-place finish at the final race of the season.

== Teams and drivers ==
=== Complete schedule ===
Team	Manufacturer	No	Race driver	Crew chief
JD Motorsports with Gary Keller	Chevrolet	01	Mike Wallace	Newt Moore
JD Motorsports with Gary Keller	Chevrolet	4	Danny Efland 17	Patrick Magee 9 Carl Harr 1 Thomas Efland 20; Danny Efland 2 Matt Jones 1
JD Motorsports with Gary Keller	Chevrolet	4	Daryl Harr 8	Patrick Magee 9 Carl Harr 1 Thomas Efland 20; Danny Efland 2 Matt Jones 1
JD Motorsports with Gary Keller	Chevrolet	4	Brad Teague 4	Patrick Magee 9 Carl Harr 1 Thomas Efland 20; Danny Efland 2 Matt Jones 1
JD Motorsports with Gary Keller	Chevrolet	4	Matt Bell 1	Patrick Magee 9 Carl Harr 1 Thomas Efland 20; Danny Efland 2 Matt Jones 1
Jeremy Clements Racing	Chevrolet	4	Jeremy Clements 2	Patrick Magee 9 Carl Harr 1 Thomas Efland 20; Danny Efland 2 Matt Jones 1
Rusty Wallace Racing	Ford	4	Steve Wallace 1	Patrick Magee 9 Carl Harr 1 Thomas Efland 20; Danny Efland 2 Matt Jones 1
Randy Hill Racing	Ford	08	Casey Roderick 3	George Ingram 29; Clinton Cram 4
Randy Hill Racing	Ford	08	Kyle Fowler 7	George Ingram 29; Clinton Cram 4
Randy Hill Racing	Ford	08	Tim Andrews 8	George Ingram 29; Clinton Cram 4
Randy Hill Racing	Ford	08	Matt Frahm 3	George Ingram 29; Clinton Cram 4
Randy Hill Racing	Ford	08	Tony Raines 1	George Ingram 29; Clinton Cram 4
Randy Hill Racing	Ford	08	Bryan Silas 1	George Ingram 29; Clinton Cram 4
Randy Hill Racing	Ford	08	Josh Richards 1	George Ingram 29; Clinton Cram 4
Randy Hill Racing	Ford	08	Louis-Philippe Dumoulin 2	George Ingram 29; Clinton Cram 4
Randy Hill Racing	Ford	08	Paulie Harraka 2	George Ingram 29; Clinton Cram 4
Randy Hill Racing	Ford	08	Mike Harmon 1	George Ingram 29; Clinton Cram 4
Randy Hill Racing	Ford	08	Danny Efland 1	George Ingram 29; Clinton Cram 4
Randy Hill Racing	Ford	08	Scott Saunders 2	George Ingram 29; Clinton Cram 4
Randy Hill Racing	Ford	08	Jeffrey Earnhardt 1	George Ingram 29; Clinton Cram 4
Richard Childress Racing	Chevrolet	2	Elliott Sadler	Luke Lambert
Richard Childress Racing	Chevrolet	3	Austin Dillon (R)	Danny Stockman 32; Gil Martin 1
Richard Childress Racing	Chevrolet	33	Tony Stewart 1	Ernie Cope
Richard Childress Racing	Chevrolet	33	Kevin Harvick 13	Ernie Cope
Richard Childress Racing	Chevrolet	33	Brendan Gaughan 10	Ernie Cope
Richard Childress Racing	Chevrolet	33	Paul Menard 7	Ernie Cope
Richard Childress Racing	Chevrolet	33	Ty Dillon 1	Ernie Cope
Richard Childress Racing	Chevrolet	33	Max Papis 1	Ernie Cope
Richard Childress Racing	Chevrolet	51	Ty Dillon 2	Ricky Pearson
Jeremy Clements Racing	Chevrolet	51	Jeremy Clements 31	Ricky Pearson
Roush Fenway Racing	Ford	6	Ricky Stenhouse Jr.	Mike Kelley
JR Motorsports	Chevrolet	7	Danica Patrick	Tony Eury Jr. 26; Ryan Pemberton 7
JR Motorsports	Chevrolet	88	Cole Whitt (R)	Tony Eury Sr. 5 Bruce Cook 28
TriStar Motorsports	Toyota	10	Jeff Green 22	Todd Myers 29; Paul Clapprood 3 Eddie Pardue 1
TriStar Motorsports	Toyota	10	Tony Raines 1	Todd Myers 29; Paul Clapprood 3 Eddie Pardue 1
TriStar Motorsports	Toyota	10	Kevin Lepage 4	Todd Myers 29; Paul Clapprood 3 Eddie Pardue 1
TriStar Motorsports	Toyota	10	Mike Bliss 3	Todd Myers 29; Paul Clapprood 3 Eddie Pardue 1
TriStar Motorsports	Toyota	10	Charles Lewandoski 3	Todd Myers 29; Paul Clapprood 3 Eddie Pardue 1
TriStar Motorsports	Toyota	14	Eric McClure 28	Wes Ward
TriStar Motorsports	Toyota	14	Jeff Green 5	Wes Ward
TriStar Motorsports	Toyota	19	Tayler Malsam 26	Eddie Pardue 29; Paul Clapprood 2 John Quinn 2
TriStar Motorsports	Toyota	19	Alex Popow 1	Eddie Pardue 29; Paul Clapprood 2 John Quinn 2
TriStar Motorsports	Toyota	19	Mike Bliss 4	Eddie Pardue 29; Paul Clapprood 2 John Quinn 2
TriStar Motorsports	Toyota	19	Hal Martin 2	Eddie Pardue 29; Paul Clapprood 2 John Quinn 2
TriStar Motorsports	Toyota	44	Mike Bliss 26	Paul Claprood 28; John Quinn 1
TriStar Motorsports	Toyota	44	Jeff Green 2	Paul Claprood 28; John Quinn 1
TriStar Motorsports	Toyota	44	Hal Martin 1	Paul Claprood 28; John Quinn 1
Tommy Baldwin Racing	Chevrolet	44	John Blankenship 4	Brad Parrott 4
Joe Gibbs Racing	Toyota	11	Brian Scott	Kevin Kidd 32; Adam Stevens 1
Joe Gibbs Racing	Toyota	18	Denny Hamlin 12	Matt Lucas 19; Adam Stevens 14
Joe Gibbs Racing	Toyota	18	Mark Martin 1	Matt Lucas 19; Adam Stevens 14
Joe Gibbs Racing	Toyota	18	Joey Logano 13	Matt Lucas 19; Adam Stevens 14
Joe Gibbs Racing	Toyota	18	Michael McDowell 4	Matt Lucas 19; Adam Stevens 14
Joe Gibbs Racing	Toyota	18	Ryan Truex 2	Matt Lucas 19; Adam Stevens 14
Joe Gibbs Racing	Toyota	18	Drew Herring 1	Matt Lucas 19; Adam Stevens 14
Penske Racing	Dodge	12	Sam Hornish Jr.	Chad Walter 32; Jeremy Bullins 1
Penske Racing	Dodge	22	Brad Keselowski 21	Jeremy Bullins 32; Chad Walter 1
Penske Racing	Dodge	22	Parker Kligerman 3	Jeremy Bullins 32; Chad Walter 1
Penske Racing	Dodge	22	Jacques Villeneuve 2	Jeremy Bullins 32; Chad Walter 1
Penske Racing	Dodge	22	Ryan Blaney 7	Jeremy Bullins 32; Chad Walter 1
R3 Motorsports	Chevrolet	23	Robert Richardson Jr. 16	Greg Conner 18; Jason Miller 15
R3 Motorsports	Chevrolet	23	Bill Prietzel 1	Greg Conner 18; Jason Miller 15
R3 Motorsports	Chevrolet	23	Dexter Stacey 2	Greg Conner 18; Jason Miller 15
Corrie Stott Racing	Chevrolet	23	Jamie Dick 14	Greg Conner 18; Jason Miller 15
RAB Racing with Brack Maggard	Toyota	24	John Wes Townley 1	Howard Bixman 1 Dave Fuge Jr. 6 Dave Fuge 1 Benny Gordon 20; Jamie Lathrop 1 Jason Sciavicco 1 Chris Bohlman 3
RAB Racing with Brack Maggard	Toyota	24	Kenny Wallace 1	Howard Bixman 1 Dave Fuge Jr. 6 Dave Fuge 1 Benny Gordon 20; Jamie Lathrop 1 Jason Sciavicco 1 Chris Bohlman 3
SR^{2} Motorsports	Toyota; Chevrolet	24	Tanner Berryhill 1	Howard Bixman 1 Dave Fuge Jr. 6 Dave Fuge 1 Benny Gordon 20; Jamie Lathrop 1 Jason Sciavicco 1 Chris Bohlman 3
SR^{2} Motorsports	Toyota; Chevrolet	24	Benny Gordon (R) 11	Howard Bixman 1 Dave Fuge Jr. 6 Dave Fuge 1 Benny Gordon 20; Jamie Lathrop 1 Jason Sciavicco 1 Chris Bohlman 3
SR^{2} Motorsports	Toyota; Chevrolet	24	Casey Roderick 6	Howard Bixman 1 Dave Fuge Jr. 6 Dave Fuge 1 Benny Gordon 20; Jamie Lathrop 1 Jason Sciavicco 1 Chris Bohlman 3
SR^{2} Motorsports	Toyota; Chevrolet	24	Tim Bainey Jr. 1	Howard Bixman 1 Dave Fuge Jr. 6 Dave Fuge 1 Benny Gordon 20; Jamie Lathrop 1 Jason Sciavicco 1 Chris Bohlman 3
SR^{2} Motorsports	Toyota; Chevrolet	24	Angela Ruch 1	Howard Bixman 1 Dave Fuge Jr. 6 Dave Fuge 1 Benny Gordon 20; Jamie Lathrop 1 Jason Sciavicco 1 Chris Bohlman 3
SR^{2} Motorsports	Toyota; Chevrolet	24	Jamie Mosley 1	Howard Bixman 1 Dave Fuge Jr. 6 Dave Fuge 1 Benny Gordon 20; Jamie Lathrop 1 Jason Sciavicco 1 Chris Bohlman 3
SR^{2} Motorsports	Toyota; Chevrolet	24	Amber Cope 1	Howard Bixman 1 Dave Fuge Jr. 6 Dave Fuge 1 Benny Gordon 20; Jamie Lathrop 1 Jason Sciavicco 1 Chris Bohlman 3
SR^{2} Motorsports	Toyota; Chevrolet	24	Scott Saunders 1	Howard Bixman 1 Dave Fuge Jr. 6 Dave Fuge 1 Benny Gordon 20; Jamie Lathrop 1 Jason Sciavicco 1 Chris Bohlman 3
SR^{2} Motorsports	Toyota; Chevrolet	24	Tim Connolly 1	Howard Bixman 1 Dave Fuge Jr. 6 Dave Fuge 1 Benny Gordon 20; Jamie Lathrop 1 Jason Sciavicco 1 Chris Bohlman 3
SR^{2} Motorsports	Toyota; Chevrolet	24	Derek White 4	Howard Bixman 1 Dave Fuge Jr. 6 Dave Fuge 1 Benny Gordon 20; Jamie Lathrop 1 Jason Sciavicco 1 Chris Bohlman 3
SR^{2} Motorsports	Toyota; Chevrolet	24	Blake Koch 1	Howard Bixman 1 Dave Fuge Jr. 6 Dave Fuge 1 Benny Gordon 20; Jamie Lathrop 1 Jason Sciavicco 1 Chris Bohlman 3
SR^{2} Motorsports	Toyota; Chevrolet	24	David Starr 3	Howard Bixman 1 Dave Fuge Jr. 6 Dave Fuge 1 Benny Gordon 20; Jamie Lathrop 1 Jason Sciavicco 1 Chris Bohlman 3
Turner Motorsports	Chevrolet	30	James Buescher 20	Trent Owens 22; Mike Hillman Jr. 11
Turner Motorsports	Chevrolet	30	Steve Arpin 2	Trent Owens 22; Mike Hillman Jr. 11
Turner Motorsports	Chevrolet	30	Nelson Piquet Jr. 2	Trent Owens 22; Mike Hillman Jr. 11
Turner Motorsports	Chevrolet	30	Jamie McMurray 1	Trent Owens 22; Mike Hillman Jr. 11
Turner Motorsports	Chevrolet	30	Jason Leffler 2	Trent Owens 22; Mike Hillman Jr. 11
Turner Motorsports	Chevrolet	30	Miguel Paludo 1	Trent Owens 22; Mike Hillman Jr. 11
Turner Motorsports	Chevrolet	30	Alex Tagliani 1	Trent Owens 22; Mike Hillman Jr. 11
Turner Motorsports	Chevrolet	30	Alex Bowman 2	Trent Owens 22; Mike Hillman Jr. 11
Turner Motorsports	Chevrolet	30	Ryan Newman 1	Trent Owens 22; Mike Hillman Jr. 11
Turner Motorsports	Chevrolet	30	Dakoda Armstrong 1	Trent Owens 22; Mike Hillman Jr. 11
Turner Motorsports	Chevrolet	31	Justin Allgaier	Jimmy Elledge
Turner Motorsports	Chevrolet	38	Kasey Kahne 15	Mike Shiplett 23; Trent Owens 10
Turner Motorsports	Chevrolet	38	Brad Sweet (R) 18	Mike Shiplett 23; Trent Owens 10
Go Green Racing Rick Ware Racing	Ford; Chevrolet	39	Joey Gase (R) 6	Clinton Cram 28; Timothy Farrell Jr. 1 George Ingram 4
Go Green Racing Rick Ware Racing	Ford; Chevrolet	39	Kelly Bires 1	Clinton Cram 28; Timothy Farrell Jr. 1 George Ingram 4
Go Green Racing Rick Ware Racing	Ford; Chevrolet	39	Matt Frahm 1	Clinton Cram 28; Timothy Farrell Jr. 1 George Ingram 4
Go Green Racing Rick Ware Racing	Ford; Chevrolet	39	Josh Richards 13	Clinton Cram 28; Timothy Farrell Jr. 1 George Ingram 4
Go Green Racing Rick Ware Racing	Ford; Chevrolet	39	Jeffrey Earnhardt 2	Clinton Cram 28; Timothy Farrell Jr. 1 George Ingram 4
Go Green Racing Rick Ware Racing	Ford; Chevrolet	39	Matt Bell 1	Clinton Cram 28; Timothy Farrell Jr. 1 George Ingram 4
Go Green Racing Rick Ware Racing	Ford; Chevrolet	39	Tim Andrews 3	Clinton Cram 28; Timothy Farrell Jr. 1 George Ingram 4
Go Green Racing Rick Ware Racing	Ford; Chevrolet	39	Matt Carter 1	Clinton Cram 28; Timothy Farrell Jr. 1 George Ingram 4
Go Green Racing Rick Ware Racing	Ford; Chevrolet	39	Dexter Stacey 5	Clinton Cram 28; Timothy Farrell Jr. 1 George Ingram 4
The Motorsports Group	Chevrolet	40	Josh Wise 1	Gary Showalter
The Motorsports Group	Chevrolet	40	Erik Darnell 31	Gary Showalter
The Motorsports Group	Chevrolet	40	J. J. Yeley 1	Gary Showalter
The Motorsports Group	Chevrolet	42	Erik Darnell 1	Mike Sroufe 23; Geoffrey Chapman 10
The Motorsports Group	Chevrolet	42	Josh Wise 26	Mike Sroufe 23; Geoffrey Chapman 10
The Motorsports Group	Chevrolet	42	Matt Frahm 2	Mike Sroufe 23; Geoffrey Chapman 10
The Motorsports Group	Chevrolet	42	Tim Schendel 2	Mike Sroufe 23; Geoffrey Chapman 10
The Motorsports Group	Chevrolet	42	Blake Koch 2	Mike Sroufe 23; Geoffrey Chapman 10
The Motorsports Group	Chevrolet	46	Chase Miller 31	Ben Williams 4 Jacob Richardson 29
The Motorsports Group	Chevrolet	46	Matt DiBenedetto 2	Ben Williams 4 Jacob Richardson 29
The Motorsports Group	Chevrolet	47	Scott Speed 12	Clint Myrick 5 Bobby Burrell 1 Chris Bohlman 24; J. C. Stout 1 James Russell 2
The Motorsports Group	Chevrolet	47	Tim Schendel 1	Clint Myrick 5 Bobby Burrell 1 Chris Bohlman 24; J. C. Stout 1 James Russell 2
The Motorsports Group	Chevrolet	47	Matt DiBenedetto 5	Clint Myrick 5 Bobby Burrell 1 Chris Bohlman 24; J. C. Stout 1 James Russell 2
The Motorsports Group	Chevrolet	47	Stephen Leicht 6	Clint Myrick 5 Bobby Burrell 1 Chris Bohlman 24; J. C. Stout 1 James Russell 2
The Motorsports Group	Chevrolet	47	J. J. Yeley 8	Clint Myrick 5 Bobby Burrell 1 Chris Bohlman 24; J. C. Stout 1 James Russell 2
The Motorsports Group	Chevrolet	47	T. J. Bell 1	Clint Myrick 5 Bobby Burrell 1 Chris Bohlman 24; J. C. Stout 1 James Russell 2
ML Motorsports	Chevrolet; Dodge	70	Johanna Long (R) 21	Mark Gutekunst
ML Motorsports	Chevrolet; Dodge	70	Charles Lewandoski 1	Mark Gutekunst
ML Motorsports	Chevrolet; Dodge	70	Derrike Cope 1	Mark Gutekunst
Robinson-Blakeney Racing	Chevrolet; Dodge	70	David Green 1	Mark Gutekunst
Robinson-Blakeney Racing	Chevrolet; Dodge	70	Tony Raines 7	Mark Gutekunst
Robinson-Blakeney Racing	Chevrolet; Dodge	70	Joe Nemechek 1	Mark Gutekunst
Rick Ware Racing	Chevrolet; Dodge	70	Timmy Hill 1	Mark Gutekunst
Rick Ware Racing	Ford; Chevrolet	41	Blake Koch 5	Chris Wright 7 George Church 23; Jeff Spraker 1 Ryan Southall 2
Rick Ware Racing	Ford; Chevrolet	41	Timmy Hill 21	Chris Wright 7 George Church 23; Jeff Spraker 1 Ryan Southall 2
Rick Ware Racing	Ford; Chevrolet	41	Fain Skinner 2	Chris Wright 7 George Church 23; Jeff Spraker 1 Ryan Southall 2
Rick Ware Racing	Ford; Chevrolet	41	Juan Carlos Blum 3	Chris Wright 7 George Church 23; Jeff Spraker 1 Ryan Southall 2
Rick Ware Racing	Ford; Chevrolet	41	Nur Ali 1	Chris Wright 7 George Church 23; Jeff Spraker 1 Ryan Southall 2
Rick Ware Racing	Ford; Chevrolet	41	Noel Dowler 1	Chris Wright 7 George Church 23; Jeff Spraker 1 Ryan Southall 2
Richard Petty Motorsports	Ford	43	Michael Annett	Philippe Lopez
Hamilton Means Racing	Chevrolet	52	Reed Sorenson 1	Timothy Brown
Hamilton Means Racing	Chevrolet	52	Tim Schendel 8	Timothy Brown
Hamilton Means Racing	Chevrolet	52	Kevin Lepage 4	Timothy Brown
Hamilton Means Racing	Chevrolet	52	Joey Gase 15	Timothy Brown
Hamilton Means Racing	Chevrolet	52	Ryan Ellis 3	Timothy Brown
Hamilton Means Racing	Chevrolet	52	Justin Jennings 2	Timothy Brown
Kyle Busch Motorsports	Toyota	54	Kyle Busch 22	Mike Beam
Kyle Busch Motorsports	Toyota	54	Kurt Busch 11	Mike Beam
MacDonald Motorsports	Dodge; Toyota	81	Jason Bowles (R)	John Monsam
NEMCO Motorsports	Toyota	87	Joe Nemechek 30	Gary Cogswell
Sacred Power Motorsports	Toyota	87	Alex Kennedy 3	Gary Cogswell
RAB Racing with Brack Maggard	Toyota	99	Kenny Wallace 12	Scott Zippadelli 32; Mike Greci 1
RAB Racing with Brack Maggard	Toyota	99	Ryan Truex 3	Scott Zippadelli 32; Mike Greci 1
RAB Racing with Brack Maggard	Toyota	99	John Wes Townley 4	Scott Zippadelli 32; Mike Greci 1
RAB Racing with Brack Maggard	Toyota	99	Victor Gonzalez Jr. 2	Scott Zippadelli 32; Mike Greci 1
RAB Racing with Brack Maggard	Toyota	99	Brett Moffitt 1	Scott Zippadelli 32; Mike Greci 1
RAB Racing with Brack Maggard	Toyota	99	Patrick Carpentier 1	Scott Zippadelli 32; Mike Greci 1
RAB Racing with Brack Maggard	Toyota	99	Alex Bowman 2	Scott Zippadelli 32; Mike Greci 1
Michael Waltrip Racing	Toyota	99	Travis Pastrana 8	Scott Zippadelli 32; Mike Greci 1

=== Limited schedule ===
Team	Manufacturer	No	Race driver	Crew chief	Rounds
SR^{2} Motorsports	Chevrolet; Toyota	00	Angela Ruch	Chris Wright 3 Kevin Eagle 8 Wayne Southard 2	2
SR^{2} Motorsports	Chevrolet; Toyota	00	Derek White	Chris Wright 3 Kevin Eagle 8 Wayne Southard 2	1
SR^{2} Motorsports	Chevrolet; Toyota	00	Blake Koch	Chris Wright 3 Kevin Eagle 8 Wayne Southard 2	8
SR^{2} Motorsports	Chevrolet; Toyota	00	Tanner Berryhill	Chris Wright 3 Kevin Eagle 8 Wayne Southard 2	1
SR^{2} Motorsports	Chevrolet; Toyota	00	Michael McDowell	Chris Wright 3 Kevin Eagle 8 Wayne Southard 2	1
Phoenix Racing	Chevrolet	1	Kurt Busch	Nick Harrison	4
R3 Motorsports	Chevrolet	03	Scott Riggs	Stephen Gonzalez	1
JR Motorsports	Chevrolet	5	Dale Earnhardt Jr.	Bruce Cook 2 Tony Eury Sr. 5	4
JR Motorsports	Chevrolet	5	Ron Fellows	Bruce Cook 2 Tony Eury Sr. 5	3
JR Motorsports	Chevrolet	5	Regan Smith	Rex Stump	1
Team SLR	Chevrolet	8	Scott Lagasse Jr.	Brad Parrott 1 Gene Nead 1 Tommy Baldwin Jr. 1	3
RAB Racing with Brack Maggard	Toyota	09	Kenny Wallace	Scott Zipadelli	1
Jennifer Jo Cobb Racing	Dodge	13	Jennifer Jo Cobb	Eddie Troconis 2 Steve Kuykendall 2	4
Rick Ware Racing	Ford; Chevrolet	15	Timmy Hill	George Church 5 Ron Utter 1 Chris Wright 2 Ken Glen 1 Ryan Southall 3 Keith Plaza 5 Carl Long 1 Timothy Farrell Jr. 4 Sterling Laughlin 2 Stephen Steffy 2 Bryan Honeycutt 1	5
Rick Ware Racing	Ford; Chevrolet	15	Jeffrey Earnhardt	George Church 5 Ron Utter 1 Chris Wright 2 Ken Glen 1 Ryan Southall 3 Keith Plaza 5 Carl Long 1 Timothy Farrell Jr. 4 Sterling Laughlin 2 Stephen Steffy 2 Bryan Honeycutt 1	3
Rick Ware Racing	Ford; Chevrolet	15	Scott Riggs	George Church 5 Ron Utter 1 Chris Wright 2 Ken Glen 1 Ryan Southall 3 Keith Plaza 5 Carl Long 1 Timothy Farrell Jr. 4 Sterling Laughlin 2 Stephen Steffy 2 Bryan Honeycutt 1	3
Rick Ware Racing	Ford; Chevrolet	15	Blake Koch	George Church 5 Ron Utter 1 Chris Wright 2 Ken Glen 1 Ryan Southall 3 Keith Plaza 5 Carl Long 1 Timothy Farrell Jr. 4 Sterling Laughlin 2 Stephen Steffy 2 Bryan Honeycutt 1	6
Rick Ware Racing	Ford; Chevrolet	15	Charles Lewandoski	George Church 5 Ron Utter 1 Chris Wright 2 Ken Glen 1 Ryan Southall 3 Keith Plaza 5 Carl Long 1 Timothy Farrell Jr. 4 Sterling Laughlin 2 Stephen Steffy 2 Bryan Honeycutt 1	1
Rick Ware Racing	Ford; Chevrolet	15	Carl Long	George Church 5 Ron Utter 1 Chris Wright 2 Ken Glen 1 Ryan Southall 3 Keith Plaza 5 Carl Long 1 Timothy Farrell Jr. 4 Sterling Laughlin 2 Stephen Steffy 2 Bryan Honeycutt 1	3
Rick Ware Racing	Ford; Chevrolet	15	Dusty Davis	George Church 5 Ron Utter 1 Chris Wright 2 Ken Glen 1 Ryan Southall 3 Keith Plaza 5 Carl Long 1 Timothy Farrell Jr. 4 Sterling Laughlin 2 Stephen Steffy 2 Bryan Honeycutt 1	1
Rick Ware Racing	Ford; Chevrolet	15	Chris Cook	George Church 5 Ron Utter 1 Chris Wright 2 Ken Glen 1 Ryan Southall 3 Keith Plaza 5 Carl Long 1 Timothy Farrell Jr. 4 Sterling Laughlin 2 Stephen Steffy 2 Bryan Honeycutt 1	2
Rick Ware Racing	Ford; Chevrolet	15	Matt Carter	George Church 5 Ron Utter 1 Chris Wright 2 Ken Glen 1 Ryan Southall 3 Keith Plaza 5 Carl Long 1 Timothy Farrell Jr. 4 Sterling Laughlin 2 Stephen Steffy 2 Bryan Honeycutt 1	1
Rick Ware Racing	Ford; Chevrolet	15	Kelly Bires	George Church 5 Ron Utter 1 Chris Wright 2 Ken Glen 1 Ryan Southall 3 Keith Plaza 5 Carl Long 1 Timothy Farrell Jr. 4 Sterling Laughlin 2 Stephen Steffy 2 Bryan Honeycutt 1	1
Rick Ware Racing	Ford; Chevrolet	15	Stanton Barrett	George Church 5 Ron Utter 1 Chris Wright 2 Ken Glen 1 Ryan Southall 3 Keith Plaza 5 Carl Long 1 Timothy Farrell Jr. 4 Sterling Laughlin 2 Stephen Steffy 2 Bryan Honeycutt 1	1
Rick Ware Racing	Ford; Chevrolet	71	Matt Carter	Stephen Steffy 3 Sterling Laughlin 3 Timothy Farrell Jr. 1 Carl Long 1 Bryan Honeycutt 2 George Church 1 Chris Wright 1	3
Rick Ware Racing	Ford; Chevrolet	71	Michael Guerity	Stephen Steffy 3 Sterling Laughlin 3 Timothy Farrell Jr. 1 Carl Long 1 Bryan Honeycutt 2 George Church 1 Chris Wright 1	1
Rick Ware Racing	Ford; Chevrolet	71	Scott Riggs	Stephen Steffy 3 Sterling Laughlin 3 Timothy Farrell Jr. 1 Carl Long 1 Bryan Honeycutt 2 George Church 1 Chris Wright 1	2
Rick Ware Racing	Ford; Chevrolet	71	Carl Long	Stephen Steffy 3 Sterling Laughlin 3 Timothy Farrell Jr. 1 Carl Long 1 Bryan Honeycutt 2 George Church 1 Chris Wright 1	5
Rick Ware Racing	Ford; Chevrolet	71	Timmy Hill	Stephen Steffy 3 Sterling Laughlin 3 Timothy Farrell Jr. 1 Carl Long 1 Bryan Honeycutt 2 George Church 1 Chris Wright 1	1
Rick Ware Racing	Ford; Chevrolet	75	Scott Riggs	Timothy Farrell Jr. 8 Ryan Southall 3 Stephen Steffy 3 Carl Long 1 Ken Glen 1	9
Rick Ware Racing	Ford; Chevrolet	75	Blake Koch	Timothy Farrell Jr. 8 Ryan Southall 3 Stephen Steffy 3 Carl Long 1 Ken Glen 1	2
Rick Ware Racing	Ford; Chevrolet	75	Michael Guerity	Timothy Farrell Jr. 8 Ryan Southall 3 Stephen Steffy 3 Carl Long 1 Ken Glen 1	1
Rick Ware Racing	Ford; Chevrolet	75	Matt Carter	Timothy Farrell Jr. 8 Ryan Southall 3 Stephen Steffy 3 Carl Long 1 Ken Glen 1	3
Rick Ware Racing	Ford; Chevrolet	75	Carl Long	Timothy Farrell Jr. 8 Ryan Southall 3 Stephen Steffy 3 Carl Long 1 Ken Glen 1	2
Rick Ware Racing	Ford; Chevrolet	75	Timmy Hill	Timothy Farrell Jr. 8 Ryan Southall 3 Stephen Steffy 3 Carl Long 1 Ken Glen 1	1
SunEnergy1 Racing	Toyota	75	Kenny Habul	Randy Cox 2 Jason Overstreet 1	3
Vision Racing	Toyota	17	J. J. Yeley	Adrian Berryhill 3 Patrick Donahue 1	1
Vision Racing	Toyota	17	Tanner Berryhill	Adrian Berryhill 3 Patrick Donahue 1	3
Joe Gibbs Racing	Toyota	20	Joey Logano	Adam Stevens 12; Matt Lucas 8 Kevin Kidd 1	9
Joe Gibbs Racing	Toyota	20	Ryan Truex	Adam Stevens 12; Matt Lucas 8 Kevin Kidd 1	5
Joe Gibbs Racing	Toyota	20	Bubba Wallace	Adam Stevens 12; Matt Lucas 8 Kevin Kidd 1	4
Joe Gibbs Racing	Toyota	20	Michael McDowell	Adam Stevens 12; Matt Lucas 8 Kevin Kidd 1	1
Joe Gibbs Racing	Toyota	20	Clint Bowyer	Adam Stevens 12; Matt Lucas 8 Kevin Kidd 1	1
Joe Gibbs Racing	Toyota	20	Brian Vickers	Adam Stevens 12; Matt Lucas 8 Kevin Kidd 1	1
Richard Childress Racing	Chevrolet	21	Joey Coulter	Harold Holly	2
Young Racing	Dodge	26	John Young	Ed Ash	3
GC Motorsports International	Ford; Dodge	27	David Ragan	Wayne Grubb	2
GC Motorsports International	Ford; Dodge	27	J. J. Yeley	Wayne Grubb	4
GC Motorsports International	Ford; Dodge	27	Andrew Ranger	Wayne Grubb	2
Robinson-Blakeney Racing	Chevrolet; Dodge	28	J. J. Yeley	Mike Chance 4 Jeff Spraker 1	1
Robinson-Blakeney Racing	Chevrolet; Dodge	28	David Green	Mike Chance 4 Jeff Spraker 1	1
Robinson-Blakeney Racing	Chevrolet; Dodge	28	Derrike Cope	Mike Chance 4 Jeff Spraker 1	1
Robinson-Blakeney Racing	Chevrolet; Dodge	28	Kevin Lepage	Mike Chance 4 Jeff Spraker 1	2
Robinson-Blakeney Racing	Chevrolet; Dodge	28	Tony Raines	Jay Robinson	2
Turner Motorsports	Chevrolet	32	Miguel Paludo	Mike Hillman Jr.	1
Tommy Baldwin Racing	Chevrolet	36	Ryan Truex	Brad Parrott	1
Tommy Baldwin Racing	Chevrolet	36	Ryan Blaney	Brad Parrott	6
Tommy Baldwin Racing	Chevrolet	36	Bobby Santos III	Brad Parrott	1
MAKE Motorsports	Chevrolet; Toyota	50	T. J. Bell	Mark Zakalowski 5 Bobby Burrell 22	22
MAKE Motorsports	Chevrolet; Toyota	50	David Starr	Mark Zakalowski 5 Bobby Burrell 22	5
NDS Motorsports	Dodge	53	Eric Curran	Mike Olsen	2
Team Kelley Racing	Chevrolet	59	Kyle Kelley	Robert Rucker	3
Roush Fenway Racing	Ford	60	Trevor Bayne	Chad Norris 5 Scott Graves 4	6
Roush Fenway Racing	Ford	60	Carl Edwards	Chad Norris 5 Scott Graves 4	1
Roush Fenway Racing	Ford	60	Billy Johnson	Chad Norris 5 Scott Graves 4	1
Roush Fenway Racing	Ford	60	Travis Pastrana	Chad Norris 5 Scott Graves 4	1
James Carter Racing	Toyota	72	John Jackson	James Malone 3 Kevin Eagle 2	5
CFK Motorsports	Chevrolet	73	Derrike Cope	Dave Fuge Jr. 1 Dom Turse 1 Bobby Burrell 1	3
Mike Harmon Racing	Chevrolet	74	Mike Harmon	Daniel Kolanda	22
Mike Harmon Racing	Chevrolet	74	David Reutimann	Daniel Kolanda	1
Mike Harmon Racing	Chevrolet	74	Kevin Lepage	Daniel Kolanda	1
Mike Harmon Racing	Chevrolet	74	Scott Riggs	Daniel Kolanda	1
Mike Harmon Racing	Chevrolet	74	Rick Crawford	Daniel Kolanda	1
Mike Harmon Racing	Chevrolet	74	David Green	Daniel Kolanda	1
Ray Hackett Racing	Ford	76	Donnie Neuenberger	Bobby Burrell	1
MacDonald Motorsports	Dodge	82	Blake Koch	Doug Howe	1
Deware Racing Group	Ford	86	Kevin Lepage	Thomas Legeman 1 Rick Markle 8	9
Shepherd Racing Ventures	Chevrolet	89	Morgan Shepherd	Gary Raven 23; Willard Clark 1 William Farrow Jr. 1 David Farrow Jr. 1 Lucas Bowman 5	31
TriStar Motorsports	Toyota	91	Jeff Green	Todd Myers	3
TriStar Motorsports	Toyota	91	Tony Raines	Todd Myers	1
NEMCO Motorsports	Toyota	97	Johnny Sauter	Mike Boerschinger	1
NEMCO Motorsports	Toyota	97	Joe Nemechek	Mike Boerschinger	1
Biagi-DenBeste Racing	Ford	98	Reed Sorenson	Scott Plattenberger 6 Jon Hanson 1	5
Biagi-DenBeste Racing	Ford	98	Kevin Swindell	Scott Plattenberger 6 Jon Hanson 1	2

=== Team changes ===
Discontinued/Suspended operations

- Kevin Harvick closed his team and transferred its cars, crew, and points over to Richard Childress Racing.
- Unable to secure a sponsor for the #66 Toyota driven by Steven Wallace, Rusty Wallace announced on January 6 that his Nationwide Series team Rusty Wallace Racing would be placed on hiatus and had released driver Michael Annett.
- After running a partial schedule in 2011, Team Rensi Motorsports moved to the K&N Pro Series East with development driver Mark Ballas.

Started operations

- Tommy Baldwin Racing returns to the Nationwide Series, fielding a #36 Chevrolet in 6 events for Sprint Cup driver Dave Blaney's son, Ryan Blaney, as well as one race appearances by K&N East Series champion Ryan Truex and Modified driver Bobby Santos III.
- Kyle Busch Motorsports announced on January 19 that driving duties would be split between Kyle Busch and his brother Kurt. Notably, Kyle ran in the Nationwide Series only for KBM, and drove 22 races while Kurt drove the other 11.

=== Driver changes ===
Driver changes

- Danica Patrick raced full-time in 2012 driving the No. 7 Chevrolet for JR Motorsports after running a part-time schedule in 2010 and 2011.
- Tayler Malsam raced full-time in 2012 driving the No. 19 Toyota for TriStar Motorsports, replacing Mike Bliss.
- 2011 ROTY runner-up Blake Koch moved to Rick Ware Racing, replacing Carl Long who drove the car for most of 2011. However, his sponsorship dried up after ESPN denied them ad time, and Koch left RWR.
- Kasey Kahne and USAC driver Brad Sweet split the driving duties of the No. 38 Chevrolet for Turner Motorsports. Sweet contested Rookie of the Year and ran 18 races while Kahne ran the other 15.
- After fielding the #39 Ford for multiple drivers in 2011, Go Green Racing announced on January 6 that Joey Gase would drive the team's #39 entry full-time and compete for Sunoco Rookie of the Year.
- After the shutdown of Rusty Wallace Racing, Michael Annett teamed up with Richard Petty Motorsports to run the #43 Ford full-time.

Entering the series

- Travis Pastrana was to make his NASCAR debut with Pastrana-Waltrip Racing, running 7 races in 2011, beginning at Indianapolis. However, due to injuries he sustained at X Games XVII, his debut was delayed until Richmond in April 2012.
- Austin Dillon moved up to the Nationwide Series to run for Rookie of The Year honors in 2012. Dillon drove a No. 3 Chevrolet for Richard Childress Racing.
- Cole Whitt was announced as the driver of the No. 88 Chevrolet for JR Motorsports on January 4, replacing Aric Almirola who moved up to the Sprint Cup Series with Richard Petty Motorsports.
- Johanna Long announced her move up to the Nationwide Series with ML Motorsports, driving their #70 Chevrolet for 22 races to compete for Rookie of the Year honors.
- On January 9, Phoenix Racing announced that its driver in the Nationwide Series, as in the Sprint Cup Series, would be Kurt Busch, who completed in Nationwide part-time.
- Ryan Blaney, son of Sprint Cup driver Dave Blaney, ran a limited schedule in the Nationwide Series, driving the team's No. 36 for 6 races.
- Former K&N West Series Champion Jason Bowles ran for Rookie of the Year with MacDonald Motorsports.

Changed teams
Exiting the series

- Aric Almirola left the series to drive in the # 43 RPM Sprint Cup Series full-time.

== Schedule ==
No.	Race title	Track	Date
1	DRIVE4COPD 300	Daytona International Speedway, Daytona Beach	February 25
2	Bashas' Supermarkets 200	Phoenix International Raceway, Phoenix	March 3
3	Sam's Town 300	Las Vegas Motor Speedway, Las Vegas	March 10
4	Ford EcoBoost 300	Bristol Motor Speedway, Bristol	March 17
5	Royal Purple 300	Auto Club Speedway, Fontana	March 24
6	O'Reilly Auto Parts 300	Texas Motor Speedway, Fort Worth	April 13
7	Virginia 529 College Savings 250	Richmond International Raceway, Richmond	April 27
8	Aaron's 312	Talladega Superspeedway, Talladega	May 5
9	VFW Sport Clips Help a Hero 200	Darlington Raceway, Darlington	May 11
10	Pioneer Hi-Bred 250	Iowa Speedway, Newton	May 20
11	History 300	Charlotte Motor Speedway, Concord	May 26
12	5-hour Energy 200	Dover International Speedway, Dover	June 2
13	Alliance Truck Parts 250	Michigan International Speedway, Brooklyn	June 16
14	Sargento 200	Road America, Elkhart Lake	June 23
15	Feed the Children 300	Kentucky Speedway, Sparta	June 29
16	Subway Jalapeño 250	Daytona International Speedway, Daytona Beach	July 6
17	F. W. Webb 200	New Hampshire Motor Speedway, Loudon	July 14
18	STP 300	Chicagoland Speedway, Joliet	July 22
19	Indiana 250	Indianapolis Motor Speedway, Speedway	July 28
20	U.S. Cellular 250	Iowa Speedway, Newton	August 4
21	Zippo 200 at The Glen	Watkins Glen International, Watkins Glen	August 11
22	NAPA Auto Parts 200	Circuit Gilles Villeneuve, Montreal	August 18
23	Food City 250	Bristol Motor Speedway, Bristol	August 24
24	NRA American Warrior 300	Atlanta Motor Speedway, Hampton	September 1
25	Virginia 529 College Savings 250	Richmond International Raceway, Richmond	September 7
26	Dollar General 300	Chicagoland Speedway, Joliet	September 15
27	Kentucky 300	Kentucky Speedway, Sparta	September 22
28	OneMain Financial 200	Dover International Speedway, Dover	September 29
29	Dollar General 300	Charlotte Motor Speedway, Concord	October 12
30	Kansas Lottery 300	Kansas Speedway, Kansas City	October 20
31	O'Reilly Auto Parts Challenge	Texas Motor Speedway, Fort Worth	November 3
32	Great Clips 200	Phoenix International Raceway, Avondale	November 10
33	Ford EcoBoost 300	Homestead-Miami Speedway, Homestead	November 17

=== Schedule changes ===
- The Richmond 250 was moved to the weekend before the Aaron's 312.
- The Pioneer Hi-Bred 250 and History 300 were moved to precede the 5-hour Energy 200.
- The Indianapolis weekend race, originally held at Lucas Oil Raceway, was moved to the Indianapolis Motor Speedway as part of "Super Weekend at the Brickyard."
- The Feed The Children 300 was moved to precede the Subway Jalapeño 250.
- Dover Motorsports removed both races from the Nashville Superspeedway.
- The Dollar General 300 was moved to precede the Kansas Lottery 300.
- Kentucky Speedway removed the IndyCar race from its schedule and replaced it with a second Nationwide race: a 300-mile event in September. The Truck undercard race continued.

== Season summary ==
The Nationwide Series started its 2012 season at Daytona. The race was dominated by a mix of tandem and pack drafting. On the final lap, Kurt and Kyle Busch attempted to block the tandem of Joey Logano and Trevor Bayne. When the Busch brothers moved up to block, it resulted in a 10 car collision that wrecked most of the top 10. Part-time Nationwide driver James Buescher sailed through the wreck and scored his first series win. Heading to Phoenix, Kevin Harvick dominated the race, leading 90 laps. On the final pitstop, teammate Sadler got two tires and managed to hold off a charging Brad Keselowski for his first Nationwide win in 14 years. Heading to Las Vegas, defending champion Ricky Stenhouse Jr. held off veteran Mark Martin for his first win of the season. The next week at Bristol, polesitter Logano dominated the race, leading 119 laps. But Elliott Sadler, on the advice of crew chief Luke Lambert, stayed out during the final round of pit stops and held off Kasey Kahne for his second win in four races. In California, Logano won back-to-back poles, but held off Stenhouse for his first win of the season.

Following the off week, teams returned to racing at Texas. There, Stenhouse and Paul Menard were the class of the field, with Menard leading 100 laps. However, Stenhouse rallied from a poor early pitstop and held off Menard for his second win of the season. At Richmond, Harvick, Kurt Busch, and Virginia native Denny Hamlin dominated the race, but Busch would hold off Hamlin to take the first Nationwide win for Kyle Busch Motorsports. The following week at Talladega, a multi-car crash on the last lap forced a red flag. On the restart, Joey Logano edged Cup teammate Kyle Busch by 0.034 seconds to take his second win of the year. At Darlington, Hamlin dominated the race, leading 102 laps. However, a push from Keselowski on a green-white-checkered restart sent Logano to the lead and to his second consecutive win. At Iowa, points leader Stenhouse once again dominated, leading 209 of 250 laps to easily claim his third consecutive Iowa win. At Charlotte, Keselowski stayed out during the final round of pit stops, going 73 laps on a single tank of fuel to claim his first win of the season. At Dover, Logano dominated the race and held off teammates Ryan Truex and Brian Scott to grab the win.

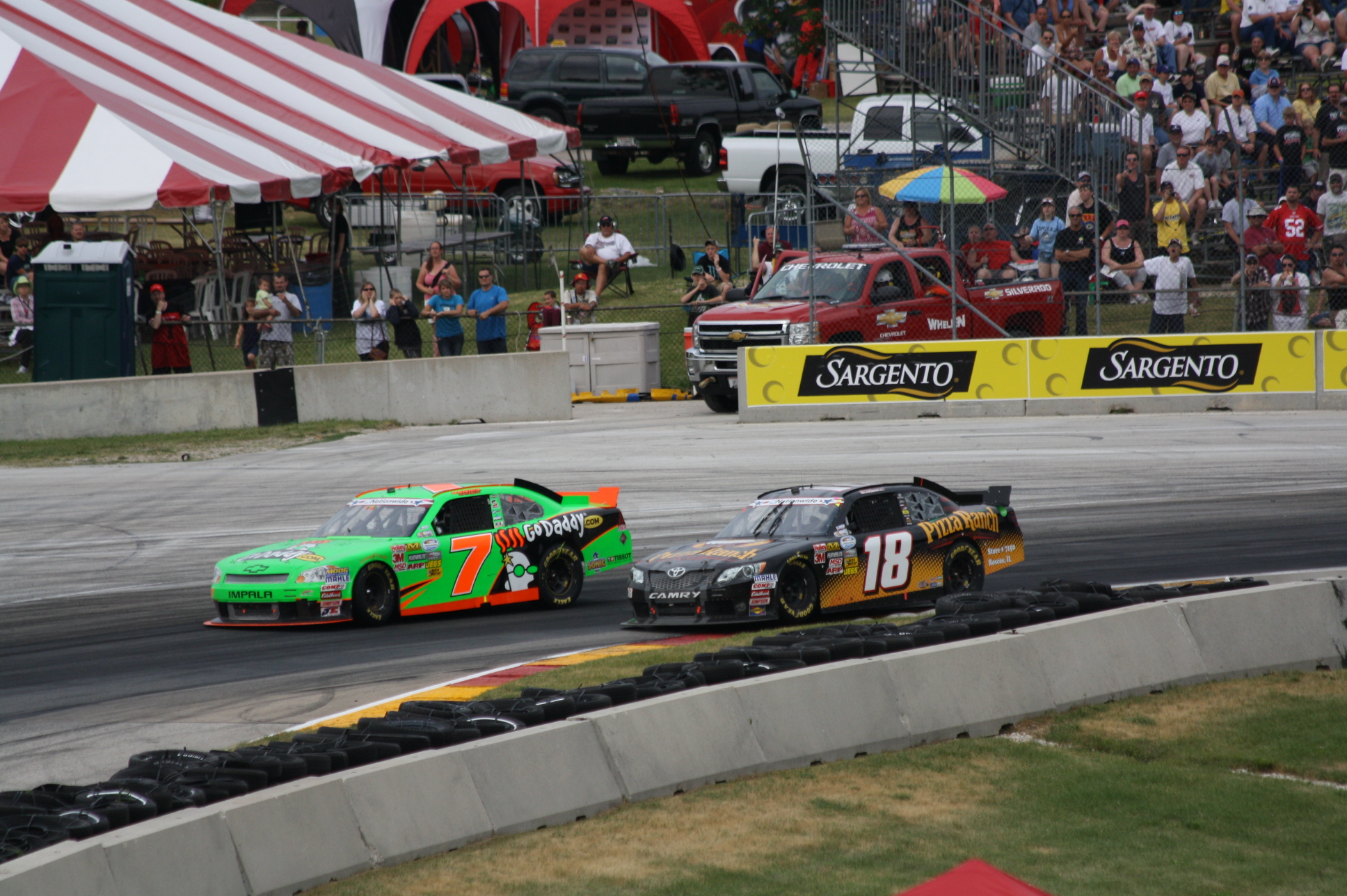
The Sargento 200 at Road America in June

Following the second off weekend, the series returned to action at Michigan, where Logano once again dominated the race, holding off Buescher to grab his second consecutive victory. The following week at Road America, Nelson Piquet Jr. dominated the race from pole, grabbing his first Nationwide win and becoming the first Brazilian to win in one of NASCAR's top three divisions. At Kentucky, Austin Dillon dominated the race, easily holding off the field to take his first career Nationwide win and becoming the first rookie winner since Juan Pablo Montoya. Dillon took over the points lead, but lost it after failing post-race inspection. When the series returned to Daytona, multiple Big Ones took out most of the contenders. However, Kurt Busch stayed out front and pulled a last lap pass on Joey Logano to take his second win of the season. The series headed to Chicago, where Stenhouse dominated most of the day, but a decision to stay out when the leaders pitted on lap 130 cost him later. On lap 166, Stenhouse pitted, handing the lead to points leader Sadler. Sadler managed to hold off both Stenhouse and Illinois native Justin Allgaier on a green-white-checkered to take his third win of the season and win the Nationwide Dash 4 Cash bonus.

The series made its inaugural trip to the Brickyard, where points leader Sadler led after Kyle Busch was involved in a late wreck. However, NASCAR officials penalized Sadler for allegedly jumping the final restart, sending him back to 16th. Cup regular Keselowski took the lead and held off teammate Sam Hornish Jr. to give owner Roger Penske his first stock car win at Indy. At the second race in Iowa, polesitter Elliott Sadler rebounded from the disappointment at Indy and held off Justin Allgaier to grab his fourth win of the season. Heading up north to Watkins Glen, Keselowski dominated the race, but Carl Edwards, making a one-off appearance, passed Keselowski with 10 to go and held on for his first win of the season. The series headed north of the border for its final road course race at Montreal. Jacques Villeneuve dominated the race, but was forced to conserve fuel over two green-white-checkered finishes. On the second attempt, Justin Allgaier pulled a bump and run on Villeneuve on the final lap to take his first win of the year.

Action resumed at the newly reconfigured Bristol. Harvick led the race for 98 laps, seeking the No. 33 team's first win of the year. However, he ran out of fuel during a caution on lap 238, handing the lead to Joey Logano. Logano would then hold off Stenhouse for the victory. At Atlanta, Harvick dominated the race, leading 157 laps. However, a late caution for a crash by Mike Bliss, Buescher, and Kyle Fowler bunched up the field. On the ensuing restart, Stenhouse made a last lap pass on Harvick to take the win. The following week at Richmond, Harvick would make up for the losses and dominated the race, leading 141 laps en route to his first win of the season. Returning to Chicagoland, Stenhouse rallied from an incorrect adjustment on the final pit stop to pass Kyle Busch with 20 to go to take his fifth win of the season as well as the points lead. At Kentucky, polesitter Austin Dillon took advantage of a fast final pitstop to get in front of the field, holding off Hornish to sweep the Kentucky races and put himself back in the championship hunt.

The series returned to Dover, where Logano once again dominated the race, leading 184 of 200 laps en route to his 7th win of the year and the season sweep at the "Monster Mile". Returning to Charlotte, the race was dominated by Cup regulars Keselowski, Logano, and Harvick. The final 30 laps were a fuel mileage race, where Logano, who pitted with 14 to go, retook the lead with 6 to go, rolling to his series high 8th win of the season. At a repaved Kansas, Stenhouse rallied from 2 laps down as well as mid-race contact with Logano to beat Kyle Busch on a green-white-checkered restart to grab his sixth win of the year. At the penultimate race in Phoenix, Logano dominated the race, holding off teammate Brian Vickers on a green-white-checkered finish to score his 9th win of the season while Stenhouse extended his points lead after Sadler crashed late in the race. At the season finale at Homestead, Regan Smith held off a dominant Kyle Busch to score his first Nationwide victory, while Stenhouse finished off his Nationwide Series career with a 6th-place finish and a second consecutive Championship.

== Results and standings ==
=== Races ===
No.	Race	Pole Position	Most Laps Led	Winning driver	Winning manufacturer	No.	Winning team
1	DRIVE4COPD 300	Danica Patrick	Kurt Busch	James Buescher	Chevrolet	30	Turner Motorsports
2	Bashas' Supermarkets 200	Denny Hamlin	Kevin Harvick	Elliott Sadler	Chevrolet	2	Richard Childress Racing
3	Sam's Town 300	Elliott Sadler	Ricky Stenhouse Jr.	Ricky Stenhouse Jr.	Ford	6	Roush Fenway Racing
4	Ford EcoBoost 300	Joey Logano	Joey Logano	Elliott Sadler	Chevrolet	2	Richard Childress Racing
5	Royal Purple 300	Joey Logano	Joey Logano	Joey Logano	Toyota	18	Joe Gibbs Racing
6	O'Reilly Auto Parts 300	Paul Menard	Paul Menard	Ricky Stenhouse Jr.	Ford	6	Roush Fenway Racing
7	Virginia 529 College Savings 250	Kevin Harvick	Kevin Harvick	Kurt Busch	Toyota	54	Kyle Busch Motorsports
8	Aaron's 312	Elliott Sadler	Kyle Busch	Joey Logano	Toyota	18	Joe Gibbs Racing
9	VFW Sport Clips Help a Hero 200	Ricky Stenhouse Jr.	Denny Hamlin	Joey Logano	Toyota	18	Joe Gibbs Racing
10	Pioneer Hi-Bred 250	Elliott Sadler	Ricky Stenhouse Jr.	Ricky Stenhouse Jr.	Ford	6	Roush Fenway Racing
11	History 300	Joey Logano	Kevin Harvick	Brad Keselowski	Dodge	22	Penske Racing
12	5-hour Energy 200	Ryan Truex	Joey Logano	Joey Logano	Toyota	18	Joe Gibbs Racing
13	Alliance Truck Parts 250	Austin Dillon	Paul Menard	Joey Logano	Toyota	18	Joe Gibbs Racing
14	Sargento 200	Nelson Piquet Jr.	Nelson Piquet Jr.	Nelson Piquet Jr.	Chevrolet	30	Turner Motorsports
15	Feed the Children 300	Austin Dillon	Austin Dillon	Austin Dillon	Chevrolet	3	Richard Childress Racing
16	Subway Jalapeño 250	Ricky Stenhouse Jr.	Kurt Busch	Kurt Busch	Chevrolet	1	Phoenix Racing
17	F. W. Webb 200	Brad Keselowski	Brad Keselowski	Brad Keselowski	Dodge	22	Penske Racing
18	STP 300	Ricky Stenhouse Jr.	Ricky Stenhouse Jr.	Elliott Sadler	Chevrolet	2	Richard Childress Racing
19	Indiana 250	Kasey Kahne	Kyle Busch	Brad Keselowski	Dodge	22	Penske Racing
20	U.S. Cellular 250	Elliott Sadler	Justin Allgaier	Elliott Sadler	Chevrolet	2	Richard Childress Racing
21	Zippo 200 at The Glen	Sam Hornish Jr.	Brad Keselowski	Carl Edwards	Ford	60	Roush Fenway Racing
22	NAPA Auto Parts 200	Alex Tagliani	Jacques Villeneuve	Justin Allgaier	Chevrolet	31	Turner Motorsports
23	Food City 250	Trevor Bayne	Kevin Harvick	Joey Logano	Toyota	18	Joe Gibbs Racing
24	NRA American Warrior 300	Kyle Busch	Kevin Harvick	Ricky Stenhouse Jr.	Ford	6	Roush Fenway Racing
25	Virginia 529 College Savings 250	Ricky Stenhouse Jr.	Kevin Harvick	Kevin Harvick	Chevrolet	33	Richard Childress Racing
26	Dollar General 300	Joey Logano	Joey Logano	Ricky Stenhouse Jr.	Ford	6	Roush Fenway Racing
27	Kentucky 300	Austin Dillon	Elliott Sadler	Austin Dillon	Chevrolet	3	Richard Childress Racing
28	OneMain Financial 200	Bubba Wallace	Joey Logano	Joey Logano	Toyota	18	Joe Gibbs Racing
29	Dollar General 300	Elliott Sadler	Joey Logano	Joey Logano	Toyota	20	Joe Gibbs Racing
30	Kansas Lottery 300	Joey Logano	Paul Menard	Ricky Stenhouse Jr.	Ford	6	Roush Fenway Racing
31	O'Reilly Auto Parts Challenge	Kyle Busch	Kevin Harvick	Kevin Harvick	Chevrolet	33	Richard Childress Racing
32	Great Clips 200	Joey Logano	Joey Logano	Joey Logano	Toyota	18	Joe Gibbs Racing
33	Ford EcoBoost 300	Kyle Busch	Kyle Busch	Regan Smith	Chevrolet	5	JR Motorsports

=== Drivers' standings ===
(key) Bold - Pole position awarded by time. Italics - Pole position set by final practice results or rainout. * – Most laps led.

Pos	Driver	DAY	PHO	LVS	BRI	CAL	TEX	RCH	TAL	DAR	IOW	CLT	DOV	MCH	ROA	KEN	DAY	NHA	CHI	IND	IOW	GLN	CGV	BRI	ATL	RCH	CHI	KEN	DOV	CLT	KAN	TEX	PHO	HOM	Points
1	Ricky Stenhouse Jr.	19	3	1*	6	2	1	4	3	**6**	1*	26	32	25	11	8	**2**^{3}	5	**2***	9	5	4	12	2	1	**2**	1	17	9	7	1	4	3	6	1251
2	Elliott Sadler	3	1	**3**	1	9	12	6	10	24	**2**	5	7	11	15	9	6	7	1	15	**1**	12	4	5	4	12	8	5*	4	**3**	4	11	22	9	1228
3	Austin Dillon **(R)**	5	4	7	12	5	5	9	17	5	4	11	6	**5**	18	**1***	4	3	6	5	15	23	9	4	6	6	3	**1**	10	6	2	6	6	5	1227
4	Sam Hornish Jr.	20	6	9	13	13	11	5	12	4	12	9	13	6	5	6	10	4	8	2	3	**3**	2	10	9	30	6	2	18	35	9	7	14	4	1146
5	Michael Annett	27	10	13	11	11	9	8	23	14	14	14	11	12	26	4	3	11	5	6	4	11	28	8	10	5	7	7	3	10	8	17	7	12	1082
6	Justin Allgaier	33	15	8	7	32	7	15	8	13	6	8	5	14	10	5	7	8	3	12	2*	9	1	30	5	13	11	8	30	34	7	8	11	11	1076
7	Cole Whitt **(R)**	4	13	6	16	21	13	19	4	10	7	28	14	4	9	14	29	18	9	17	19	24	33	6	8	14	14	6	6	13	5	12	29	10	994
8	Mike Bliss	39	16	15	15	17	16	17	18	15	15	12	33	13	13	17	8	13	12	11	20	14	13	13	22	15	13	18	11	36	13	18	13	19	902
9	Brian Scott	37	14	34	35	4	37	14	36	7	11	31	3	9	7	30	32	12	11	14	18	10	24	34	11	28	10	11	7	8	26	22	8	7	853
10	Danica Patrick	**38**	21	12	19	35	8	21	13	12	30	13	30	18	12	12	31	14	14	35	11	43	27	9	13	29	12	14	16	11	10	14	10	13	838
11	Joe Nemechek	23	24	20	30	19	17	13	19	11	19	29	19	15		18	22	19	13	18	16	27	30	11	14	8	16	27	17	17	12	20	16	18	816
12	Mike Wallace	28	32	17	23	18	19	24	28	30	21	15	18	20	19	31	36	15	16	20	25	18	7	17	17	21	19	20	21	23	21	24	19	26	749
13	Jason Bowles **(R)**	41	19	27	25	15	18	30	34	21	17	33	15	19	14	22	14	16	23	16	29	17	26	18	16	23	28	16	20	28	20	33	17	29	715
14	Jeremy Clements	25	22	21	20	20	29	33	29	33	23	18	10	31	25	21	11	17	22	10	21	19	25	33	15	24	30	15	27	19	35	16	33	22	701
15	Tayler Malsam	6	20	16	18	16	25	25	24	31	29	20	16	21	30	23	15	20	25	29	22		14	12	18	19	18	23							609
16	Eric McClure	22	28	25	27	26	24	31	27	INJ	INJ	INJ	INJ	INJ	21	26	18	22	24	24	31	26	19	27	21	26	25	22	26	22	15	21	20	27	559
17	Erik Darnell	DNQ	26	35	21	24	23	35	14	29	18	27	27	22	23	25	21	40	30	38	27		16	35	20	18	22	24	31	21	17	25	37	35	558
18	Brad Sweet **(R)**					6			33		13		23	24	20	16	24		19		12		20			20	15	10		15	23	13		17	469
19	Timmy Hill	7^{2}	Wth^{2}				28	26	21	16	25	19	31	26	22	32	9	21	18	23	30	35	36	25	33	31	33	29	24	33	38	39	27	DNQ	452
20	Johanna Long **(R)**	21		19	29		20	20	37		22	22		16		19	12		21	30	13			29		32	21	12			31	36		34	428
21	Danny Efland	13					31		16	20		35		27		34	13	29	32						19		27	30	35	31	14	28		31	327
22	Kenny Wallace	30	36	11	33	7			9					34		11			4^{1}	19							20				18	15		15	311
23	Ryan Truex	31			10		32		11				**2**					10	10			15				16			14					38	298
24	Jamie Dick		23		22					23	24		21	29		24		30	29		24						23	19	25				18		282
25	T. J. Bell	24	29	31	34	27	26	28	31	32	27	30	24	32	37	27	39	35	38	39	36	Wth							41	DNQ		43			258
26	Jeff Green	43	43	40	42	43	43	43	39	19	32	32	17	17	43	42	43	43	43	36	43	40	43	42	35	43	31		15	16	42	37	23	40	256
27	Josh Richards								30	25	34	34	22	30	31	20	16	24	20		34			19				21							256
28	Robert Richardson Jr.	35		24		21	34	34	26			39					17			31				24	31	22				20	39	27		33	248
29	Morgan Shepherd	DNQ	38	22	DNQ	34	DNQ	36	35	22	31	37	29	33	36	35	Wth	32	34	DNQ	35	33		DNQ	34	DNQ	32	31	DNQ	DNQ	32	DNQ	35	DNQ	239
30	Joey Gase **(R)**	29	25	37	36	23					33	25	26				37	27			32			31	43	DNQ	35	35		DNQ	19	31	DNQ	32	236
31	Blake Koch	17	31	18	38	25	36	39	DNQ	34	40		41	36		41	19		36				41	DNQ	36	37^{1}	36		22		36	38	39	39	230
32	Trevor Bayne	11	7	4	8	14																		**16**											208
33	Travis Pastrana							22		17	26	24						31	17	13					26	17									204
34	Benny Gordon **(R)**	12	27	30	24	22	33												31					22	24		29	32							198
35	Kevin Lepage				31	33	42	27	43	35	41	43	39	42		36		33		40				20		33		34	34	26		40	34		175
36	Bubba Wallace										9										7					10			**12**						139
37	Casey Roderick **(R)**	36	17					23		40	20	21			32		27																		136
38	Kyle Fowler			28	28		21					23								32					25					24					127
39	Reed Sorenson	34										16				13				33					32					12					124
40	Daryl Harr		33	26		28					28										33	30	23										28		123
41	Ron Fellows														3							5	5												120
42	Tim Schendel		30	29	37	29	27				42			35	42				33	28	39														113
43	Jeffrey Earnhardt				26				25								30			21										27				23	112
44	Chase Miller	DNQ	41	39	40	38	39	42	41	41	43	40		38	40	39	40	38	40	41	42		42	43	38	42	42	39	38	37	43	DNQ	42	41	107
45	Mike Harmon	DNQ	39	43^{1}		40		41	38	37	35	38	34	43			38	36	39	DNQ	37				39	DNQ	39	36	DNQ		41		36		106
46	Alex Bowman																										17	25	19				15		100
47	Tim Andrews					36			32		37		40			38			37				17	41			43		29			35			100
48	Dexter Stacey																					32	35			27	24				27		30	43	90
49	Jacques Villeneuve														6								3*												82
50	John Blankenship																				23											26	25	36	66
51	Brad Teague				32								25											26					28						65
52	Derek White																					DNQ	18			34					29		31		64
53	Tanner Berryhill							29								28			26							35		38							64
54	Steve Arpin						10				16																								62
55	Kenny Habul														16							20	34												62
56	Scott Lagasse Jr.																											26			24			20	62
57	Matt Frahm							32		28	38				38			25										42							61
58	Kevin Swindell																															9		21	59
59	Alex Kennedy														33							29	15												56
60	Victor Gonzalez Jr.														17							16													55
61	Kyle Kelley														35							21	21												55
62	Matt Carter												35					37	35						30	39	38	40		DNQ					54
63	Derrike Cope	DNQ		32	DNQ					27																							24		49
64	Carl Long																		42		38			37	41	38		37	37		37		41		48
65	Hal Martin																														25	30		30	47
66	Max Papis														4																				41
67	Drew Herring																											4							41
68	Juan Carlos Blum																										26					29		37	40
69	Scott Saunders																				28										34	32			38
70	Billy Johnson																						8												36
71	Brett Moffitt																				9														35
72	Steve Wallace							11																											33
73	John Young														28							DNQ	31												29
74	Andrew Ranger																						32											28	28
75	David Green		35			31																								39					27
76	Angela Cope											36		28																43					25
77	Alex Tagliani																						**22**												23
78	Fain Skinner																							28	37										23
79	Matt DiBenedetto												42	41	41						41	41	40					41							21
80	Tim Connolly																					25													19
81	Charles Lewandoski		34															39										43	43	42					19
82	Amber Cope																	26																	18
83	Matt Bell														34							36													18
84	Bill Prietzel														27																				17
85	Eric Curran																					34	37												17
86	Tim Bainey Jr.												28																						16
87	Jamie Mosley															29																			15
88	Patrick Carpentier																						29												15
89	Stanton Barrett																													29					15
90	Noel Dowler																																32		12
91	Bobby Santos III																33																		11
92	Nur Ali																														33		QL		11
93	John Jackson					42	DNQ				36					DNQ																			10
94	Michael Guerity										39			40																					9
95	Louis-Philippe Dumoulin																					DNQ	38												6
96	Alex Popow																					38													6
97	Chris Cook																					37^{4}	39												5
98	Ryan Ellis														39							DNQ	DNQ												5
	Donnie Neuenberger	DNQ																																	0
Ineligible for Nationwide championship points
Pos	Driver	DAY	PHO	LVS	BRI	CAL	TEX	RCH	TAL	DAR	IOW	CLT	DOV	MCH	ROA	KEN	DAY	NHA	CHI	IND	IOW	GLN	CGV	BRI	ATL	RCH	CHI	KEN	DOV	CLT	KAN	TEX	PHO	HOM	Points
	Joey Logano	16	8		**4***	**1***	15	18	1	1		**6**	1*	1			5			7		22		1			**9***		1*	1*	**3**	10	**1***	16	
	Brad Keselowski	2	2	23	3	3	35	16	20	3		1		10		7	35	**1***		1		2*		32	2		4			18			9		
	Kevin Harvick		5*		9			**3***	22			4*				3	28	2						15*	3*	1*				2		1*			
	Kurt Busch	10*					30	1	6	8	5		4	3	8	2	1*			34	17					3		28							
	James Buescher	1	12	14	14	12		12	7	9		7	9	2		10	34		15	26					23	11		13		9	28				
	Nelson Piquet Jr.														**1***									21											
	Carl Edwards																					1													
	Regan Smith																																	1	
	Kyle Busch	18	11	33	17	8			2*			3					23	28	27	22*		6	10	3	**7**		2		5	4	6	**3**	4	**2***	
	Denny Hamlin	32	**9**				4	2		2*		2				33				4					12	4				5		5			
	Paul Menard						**2***							8*						8		8					5		2		16*				
	Kasey Kahne	9	18	10	2		3	10		18		17						6		**25**		7		14	28				8				5		
	Michael McDowell										3			7	2						6		6						40						
	Ryan Blaney							7^{5}		43^{5}						15^{5}				27^{5}	10^{5}			7^{5}		9		9	13	14	11	2		8	
	Mark Martin			2																															
	Brian Vickers																																2		
	Brendan Gaughan			5		10				26	10								28		14		11					3					26	3	
	Ty Dillon												8							3						7									
	Dale Earnhardt Jr.	15			5		14		5																										
	David Ragan	26					6																												
	Parker Kligerman										8		12						7																
	Jason Leffler																				8												12		
	Tony Stewart	8																																	
	Jamie McMurray																	9																	
	Joey Coulter											10																						14	
	Miguel Paludo														29							13													
	Josh Wise	14	40	41	43	39	40	38	40	39		41	37	39		40	41	41		42		39		40	40	40	41		39	41		42	40	42	
	John Wes Townley								15				20				25							23						32					
	Ryan Newman																															19			
	Bryan Silas																20																		
	Paulie Harraka																									25							21		
	Jennifer Jo Cobb		DNQ	36																											22	DNQ			
	Kelly Bires						22																						42			QL			
	Tony Raines									36			Wth	23	24			23				28			29		34		33	30	30		43		
	David Starr																							39	27	DNQ		33	DNQ	25		23		24	
	J. J. Yeley	40	37	38	39			37														31			42	41	40		23	38	40	41	38	DNQ	
	Dakoda Armstrong																																	25	
	Justin Jennings																				26								32						
	Clint Bowyer																26																		
	Scott Riggs						38	DNQ		38			36	37		37		34		37				38		36	37		36	40		34		DNQ	
	Rick Crawford																							36											
	Scott Speed	DNQ	42	42	41		41	40	42	42		42	38			43																			
	Dusty Davis																				40														
	Stephen Leicht																42	42	41	43		42		DNQ											
	Johnny Sauter	42																																	
	David Reutimann				DNQ																														
Pos	Driver	DAY	PHO	LVS	BRI	CAL	TEX	RCH	TAL	DAR	IOW	CLT	DOV	MCH	ROA	KEN	DAY	NHA	CHI	IND	IOW	GLN	CGV	BRI	ATL	RCH	CHI	KEN	DOV	CLT	KAN	TEX	PHO	HOM	Points

- ^{1} – Post entry, driver and owner did not score points.
- ^{2} – Timmy Hill was originally registered for Sprint Cup points, but switched to Nationwide at Texas.
- ^{3} – Ricky Stenhouse Jr. was awarded the pole after Austin Dillon failed inspection.
- ^{4} – Chris Cook was originally registered for Sprint Cup points, but switched to Nationwide at Montreal.
- ^{5} – Ryan Blaney was originally registered for Nationwide points, but switched to the Trucks at Atlanta.

=== Manufacturer ===
Pos	Manufacturer	Wins	Points
1	Chevrolet	13	**216**
2	Toyota	10	**189**
3	Ford	7	**170**
4	Dodge	3	**151**

== See also ==
- 2012 NASCAR Sprint Cup Series
- 2012 NASCAR Camping World Truck Series
- 2012 NASCAR K&N Pro Series East
- 2012 ARCA Racing Series
- 2012 NASCAR Whelen Modified Tour
- 2012 NASCAR Whelen Southern Modified Tour
- 2012 NASCAR Canadian Tire Series
- 2012 NASCAR Toyota Series
- 2012 NASCAR Stock V6 Series
- 2012 Racecar Euro Series
