= Tim Bainey Jr. =

American racing driver

- Born: Timothy Bainey Jr. April 24, 1978 (age 48); Philipsburg, Pennsylvania, U.S.

NASCAR O'Reilly Auto Parts Series career
- 1 race run over 1 year
- Best finish: 87th (2012)
- First race: 2012 5-hour Energy 200 (Dover)
Wins	Top tens	Poles
0	0	0

NASCAR FedEx Freight Truck Series career
- 8 races run over 2 years
- Best finish: 45th (2009)
- First race: 2009 AAA Insurance 200 (Dover)
- Last race: 2010 TheRaceDayRaffleSeries.com 175 (Loudon)
Wins	Top tens	Poles
0	0	0
- Statistics up to date as of February 25, 2013.

Timothy Bainey Jr. (born April 24, 1978) is an American stock car racing driver. He is a veteran of the Hooters Pro Cup Series and also made starts in what is now the ARCA Menards Series, the NASCAR Xfinity and Truck Series, and the East Series. He was born in Philipsburg, Pennsylvania.

== Racing career ==
Bainey began his racing career at Clearfield Speedway in Pennsylvania in 1988, winning the track championship in 1995. Following competing on a limited schedule in the ARCA Re/MAX Series between 1997 and 2000, Bainey raced for a number of years in the USAR Hooters Pro Cup Series, competing in the series' North Division; he posted one top-five finish and a best national points finish of 21st over eight years and 78 races of competition, while he finished in the top-ten in North Division points three times during his Pro Cup career. Bainey also competed in late model races across southern New England during the early to mid 2000s.

Bainey made his debut in NASCAR competition in the Busch North Series at Holland International Speedway in 2005, finishing 17th in his first race in the series. He made his debut in the Camping World Truck Series at Dover International Speedway in 2009, finishing 15th, his best career finish in the series, and on the lead lap in his first race; he also led a lap during the event. He would make seven additional starts in the series over the next two years, with his last start coming in September 2010 at New Hampshire Motor Speedway in a truck owned by Dale Brackett.

After over a year's hiatus from racing, Bainey returned to NASCAR competition in 2012, driving for SR² Motorsports at Dover in the Nationwide Series 5-hour Energy 200. He started 41st, was wrecked by race leader Joey Logano after 144 laps of competition, and finished 28th.

Bainey also competed in the K&N Pro Series East event at CNB Bank Raceway Park, a track he co-owns along with his father, Tim Bainey Sr., in July 2012, finishing tenth.

== Personal life ==
Bainey is married to Nikki.

== Motorsports career results ==
=== NASCAR ===
(key) (Bold – Pole position awarded by qualifying time. Italics – Pole position earned by points standings or practice time. * – Most laps led.)

==== Nationwide Series ====
NASCAR Nationwide Series results
Year	Team	No.	Make	1	2	3	4	5	6	7	8	9	10	11	12	13	14	15	16	17	18	19	20	21	22	23	24	25	26	27	28	29	30	31	32	33	34	NNSC	Pts	Ref
2002	DRT Enterprises	15	Ford	DAY	CAR	LVS	DAR	BRI	TEX	NSH	TAL	CAL	RCH	NHA	NZH	CLT	DOV	NSH	KEN	MLW	DAY	CHI	GTY	PPR	IRP	MCH	BRI; DNQ	DAR	RCH	DOV	KAN	CLT	MEM; DNQ	ATL	CAR	PHO	HOM	N/A	0	
2012	SR² Motorsports	24	Chevy	DAY	PHO	LVS	BRI	CAL	TEX	RCH	TAL	DAR	IOW	CLT	DOV; 28	MCH	ROA	KEN	DAY	NHA	CHI	IND	IOW	GLN	CGV	BRI	ATL	RCH	CHI	KEN	DOV	CLT	KAN	TEX	PHO	HOM		87th	16	

==== Camping World Truck Series ====
NASCAR Camping World Truck Series results
Year	Team	No.	Make	1	2	3	4	5	6	7	8	9	10	11	12	13	14	15	16	17	18	19	20	21	22	23	24	25	NCWTC	Pts	Ref
2009	Aaron's Lucky Dog Racing Team	00	Chevy	DAY	CAL	ATL	MAR	KAN	CLT	DOV; 15	TEX	MCH	MLW	MEM	KEN	IRP; 31	NSH	BRI; DNQ	CHI	IOW; 21	GTW	NHA; 30	LVS	MAR; DNQ	TAL	TEX	PHO	HOM	45th	366	
2010	Fast Track Racing Enterprises	48	Chevy	DAY	ATL; 31	MAR	NSH; 33	KAN	DOV	CLT	TEX	MCH	IOW	GTY	IRP	POC; 25	NSH	DAR	BRI	CHI	KEN								64th	304	
2010	Brackett Family Motorsports	06	Chevy																			NHA; 27	LVS	MAR	TAL	TEX	PHO	HOM	64th	304	

==== K&N Pro Series East ====
NASCAR K&N Pro Series East results
Year	Team	No.	Make	1	2	3	4	5	6	7	8	9	10	11	12	13	14	NKNPSEC	Pts	Ref
2005		97	Chevy	STA	HOL; 17	ERI	NHA	WFD	ADI	STA	DUB	OXF	NHA	DOV	LRP	TMP		55th	112	
2012	Tim Bainey Sr.	27	Chevy	BRI	GRE	RCH	IOW	BGS	JFC	LGY	CNB; 10	COL	IOW	NHA	DOV	GRE	CAR	56th	34	

=== ARCA Bondo/Mar-Hyde Series ===
(key) (Bold – Pole position awarded by qualifying time. Italics – Pole position earned by points standings or practice time. * – Most laps led.)

ARCA Bondo/Mar-Hyde Series results
Year	Team	No.	Make	1	2	3	4	5	6	7	8	9	10	11	12	13	14	15	16	17	18	19	20	21	22	ABMHSC	Pts	Ref
1997	DRT Enterprises	54	Chevy	DAY	ATL	SLM	CLT	CLT	POC; 11	MCH	SBS	TOL	KIL	FRS	MIN	POC; 16	MCH	DSF	GTW	SLM	WIN	CLT	TAL	ISF	ATL	98th	?	
1998	Jim & Judie Motorsports	42	Chevy	DAY	ATL	SLM	CLT	MEM	MCH	POC; 30	SBS	TOL	PPR	POC; 20	KIL; 10	FRS; 21	ISF	ATL; 39	DSF	SLM	TEX	WIN	CLT; DNQ	TAL	ATL	38th	?	
1999	DRT Enterprises	54	Chevy	DAY; DNQ	ATL; DNQ	SLM; 12		CLT; 31	MCH; DNQ																	48th	630	
1999	Jim & Judie Motorsports	42	Chevy				AND; 17			POC; 40	TOL	SBS	BLN	POC	KIL	FRS	FLM	ISF	WIN	DSF	SLM; 9	CLT	TAL	ATL		48th	630	
2000	Watson Racing	34		DAY; DNQ	SLM	AND	CLT	KIL	FRS	MCH; DNQ																76th	265	
2000	Bowsher Motorsports	21	Ford								POC; 22	TOL	KEN	BLN	POC; 27	WIN	ISF	KEN	DSF	SLM	CLT	TAL	ATL			76th	265	
