= Scott Saunders =

Australian racing driver (born 1988)

- Born: October 17, 1988 (age 38); Brisbane, Queensland, Australia

NASCAR O'Reilly Auto Parts Series career
- 3 races run over 1 year
- Best finish: 69th (2012)
- First race: 2012 U.S. Cellular 250 (Iowa)
- Last race: 2012 O'Reilly Auto Parts Challenge (Texas)
Wins	Top tens	Poles
0	0	0

NASCAR FedEx Freight Truck Series career
- 1 race run over 1 year
- Best finish: 82nd (2013)
- First race: 2013 SFP 250 (Kansas)
Wins	Top tens	Poles
0	0	0
- Statistics up to date as of January 14, 2025.

Scott Saunders (born October 17, 1988) is an Australian former professional stock car racing driver who has competed in the NASCAR Nationwide Series and the NASCAR Camping World Truck Series.

Saunders has also previously competed in the NASCAR K&N Pro Series East, the PASS South Super Late Model Series, the X-1R Pro Cup Series, and the CRA Super Series Southern Division.

== Motorsports results ==
=== NASCAR ===
(key) (Bold - Pole position awarded by qualifying time. Italics - Pole position earned by points standings or practice time. * – Most laps led.)

==== Nationwide Series ====
NASCAR Nationwide Series results
Year	Team	No.	Make	1	2	3	4	5	6	7	8	9	10	11	12	13	14	15	16	17	18	19	20	21	22	23	24	25	26	27	28	29	30	31	32	33	NNSC	Pts	Ref
2012	SR² Motorsports	24	Chevy	DAY	PHO	LVS	BRI	CAL	TEX	RCH	TAL	DAR	IOW	CLT	DOV	MCH	ROA	KEN	DAY	NHA	CHI	IND	IOW; 28	GLN	CGV	BRI	ATL	RCH	CHI	KEN	DOV	CLT					69th	38	
2012	Randy Hill Racing	08	Ford																														KAN; 34	TEX; 32	PHO	HOM	69th	38	

==== Camping World Truck Series ====
NASCAR Camping World Truck Series results
Year	Team	No.	Make	1	2	3	4	5	6	7	8	9	10	11	12	13	14	15	16	17	18	19	20	21	22	NCWTC	Pts	Ref
2013	Jennifer Jo Cobb Racing	0	RAM	DAY	MAR	CAR	KAN; 36	CLT	DOV	TEX	KEN	IOW	ELD	POC	MCH	BRI	MSP	IOW	CHI	LVS	TAL	MAR	TEX	PHO	HOM	82nd	8	

==== K&N Pro Series East ====
NASCAR K&N Pro Series East results
Year	Team	No.	Make	1	2	3	4	5	6	7	8	9	10	11	12	13	14	NKNPSEC	Pts	Ref
2012	MacDonald Motorsports	49	Dodge	BRI; 16	GRE; 18	RCH; 19	IOW	BGS	JFC	LGY	CNB	COL	IOW	NHA	DOV	GRE	CAR	36th	79	
