= SR2 Motorsports =

American stock car racing team

SR^{2} Motorsports
- Owner(s): Jason Sciavicco; Derek White; Benny Gordon
- Base: Mooresville, North Carolina
- Series: Nationwide Series
- Race drivers: Jason White; Harrison Rhodes; Ruben Garcia, Jr. Ryan Ellis; Michael McDowell
- Manufacturer: Toyota
- Opened: 2012
- Closed: 2014

Career
- Debut: 2012 DRIVE4COPD 300 (Daytona)
- Latest race: 2014 Treatmyclot.com 300 (Fontana)
- Races competed: 100
- Drivers' Championships: 0
- Race victories: 0
- Pole positions: 0

SR^{2} Motorsports was a team that competed in the NASCAR Nationwide Series. The team fielded the No. 00 Toyota Camry for Jason White, and the No. 24 Toyota Camry for various drivers. The team was shut down after rising cost of NASCAR to be competitive in the series.

== History ==
Car No. 00 history

SR^{2} Motorsports ran a second car, the No. 00, for Angela Cope at Charlotte in May. She finished 36th. Derek White drove the No. 00 in Watkins Glen, but did not qualify. Blake Koch drove the car for the second part of the season as a start and park, but was replaced for three races by Michael McDowell, Tanner Berryhill, and Angela Cope.

In 2013, Jason White drove the first five races of the season the No. 00 Toyota. Michael McDowell drove for the team at Texas I, and Richmond I. Ken Butler III and Bryan Silas drove the car one race each. Actually, Blake Koch drove for the No. 00 team. The No. 00 team was fielded as a start and park team to help fund the No. 24 car, starting at 5-Hour Energy 200 at Dover at first of June 2013.

=== Car No. 00 results ===
NASCAR Nationwide Series results
| Year | Driver | No. | Make | 1 | 2 | 3 | 4 | 5 | 6 | 7 | 8 | 9 | 10 | 11 | 12 | 13 | 14 | 15 | 16 | 17 | 18 | 19 | 20 | 21 | 22 | 23 | 24 | 25 | 26 | 27 | 28 | 29 | 30 | 31 | 32 | 33 | Owners | Pts |
|---|---|---|---|---|---|---|---|---|---|---|---|---|---|---|---|---|---|---|---|---|---|---|---|---|---|---|---|---|---|---|---|---|---|---|---|---|---|---|
| 2012 | Angela Ruch | 00 | Chevy | DAY | PHO | LVS | BRI | CAL | TEX | RCH | TAL | DAR | IOW | CLT; 36 | DOV | MCH | ROA | KEN | DAY | NHA | CHI | IND | IOW | | | | | | | | | | | | | | 55th | 59 |
| 2012 | Angela Ruch | 00 | Toyota | | | | | | | | | | | | | | | | | | | | | | | | | | | | | CLT; 43 | | | | | 55th | 59 |
| 2012 | Derek White | 00 | Chevy | | | | | | | | | | | | | | | | | | | | | GLN; DNQ | CGV | | | | | | | | | | | | 55th | 59 |
| 2012 | Blake Koch | 00 | Chevy | | | | | | | | | | | | | | | | | | | | | | | BRI; DNQ | ATL; 36 | RCH; 37 | | | | | | | | | 55th | 59 |
| 2012 | Blake Koch | 00 | Toyota | | | | | | | | | | | | | | | | | | | | | | | | | | CHI; 36 | | | | KAN; 36 | TEX; 38 | PHO; 39 | HOM; 39 | 55th | 59 |
| 2012 | Tanner Berryhill | 00 | Toyota | | | | | | | | | | | | | | | | | | | | | | | | | | | KEN; 38 | | | | | | | 55th | 59 |
| 2012 | Michael McDowell | 00 | Toyota | | | | | | | | | | | | | | | | | | | | | | | | | | | | DOV; 40 | | | | | | 55th | 59 |
| 2013 | Jason White | 00 | Toyota | DAY; 24 | PHO; 22 | LVS; 25 | BRI; 30 | CAL; 33 | | | | | | | | | | | | | | | | | | | | | | | | | | | | | 38th | 256 |
| 2013 | Michael McDowell | 00 | Toyota | | | | | | TEX; DNQ | RCH; 22 | | | | | | | | | | | | | | | | BRI; DNQ | | | | | | | | | | | 38th | 256 |
| 2013 | Blake Koch | 00 | Toyota | | | | | | | | TAL; 33 | DAR; 22 | | DOV; 40 | IOW; 36 | | ROA; Wth | KEN; 34 | DAY; DNQ | NHA; 37 | | | IOW; 38 | GLN; 36 | MOH; 40 | | ATL; 40 | | CHI; 38 | KEN; 39 | DOV; 30 | KAN; 37 | CLT; 38 | TEX; 36 | PHO; 38 | HOM | 38th | 256 |
| 2013 | Bryan Silas | 00 | Toyota | | | | | | | | | | CLT; DNQ | | | | | | | | | | | | | | | | | | | | | | | | 38th | 256 |
| 2013 | Ken Butler III | 00 | Toyota | | | | | | | | | | | | | MCH; 34 | | | | | CHI; 38 | | | | | | | | | | | | | | | | 38th | 256 |
| 2013 | David Green | 00 | Toyota | | | | | | | | | | | | | | | | | | | IND; 38 | | | | | | | | | | | | | | | 38th | 256 |
| 2013 | Brett Butler | 00 | Toyota | | | | | | | | | | | | | | | | | | | | | | | | | RCH; DNQ | | | | | | | | | 38th | 256 |
| 2014 | Jason White | 00 | Toyota | DAY; 31 | PHO | LVS | BRI | CAL | TEX | DAR | RCH | TAL | IOW | CLT | DOV | MCH | ROA | KEN | DAY | NHA | CHI | IND | IOW | GLN | MOH | BRI | ATL | RCH | CHI | KEN | DOV | KAN | CLT | TEX | PHO | HOM | 61st | 13 |

Car No. 24 history

SR^{2} Motorsports was founded in 2012, making its debut in the Nationwide Series with the No. 24 Toyota in the 2012 DRIVE4COPD 300 at Daytona International Speedway with Benny Gordon, finishing 12th. In 2012, Benny drove the car for 11 races. Casey Roderick drove the car in five races, David Starr in three races, Derek White in four races. Angela and Amber Cope, Tim Bainey Jr., Tanner Berryhill, Blake Koch, Jamie Mosley, Tim Connolly, Scott Saunders, John Wes Townley and Kenny Wallace each drove the car for one race apiece. The best finishes was a 12th at Daytona with Benny Gordon, and at Talladega with a 15th with John Wes Townley, and the team finished 28th in owner standings at the end of the 2012 season.

For 2013, Blake Koch returned to SR^{2} Motorsports, for a full season in the No. 24 Toyota. He drove the car for the first seven races before switching to the 00. Various drivers drove for the No. 24 team, including Jason White, Brett Butler, and Ken Butler III and as of late, Ryan Ellis.

Harrison Rhodes drove the No. 24 in 2014 in a limited schedule starting at Daytona International Speedway.

=== Car No. 24 results ===
NASCAR Nationwide Series results
| Year | Driver | No. | Make | 1 | 2 | 3 | 4 | 5 | 6 | 7 | 8 | 9 | 10 | 11 | 12 | 13 | 14 | 15 | 16 | 17 | 18 | 19 | 20 | 21 | 22 | 23 | 24 | 25 | 26 | 27 | 28 | 29 | 30 | 31 | 32 | 33 | Owners | Pts |
|---|---|---|---|---|---|---|---|---|---|---|---|---|---|---|---|---|---|---|---|---|---|---|---|---|---|---|---|---|---|---|---|---|---|---|---|---|---|---|
| 2012 | Benny Gordon | 24 | Toyota | DAY; 12 | | | | | | | | | | | | | | | | | | | | | | BRI; 22 | ATL; 24 | | CHI; 29 | KEN; 32 | | | | | | | 28th | 593 |
| 2012 | Benny Gordon | 24 | Chevy | | PHO; 27 | LVS; 30 | BRI; 24 | CAL; 22 | TEX; 33 | | | | | | | | | | | | CHI; 31 | | | | | | | | | | | | | | | | 28th | 593 |
| 2012 | Tanner Berryhill | 24 | Chevy | | | | | | | RCH; 29 | | | | | | | | | | | | | | | | | | | | | | | | | | | 28th | 593 |
| 2012 | John Wes Townley | 24 | Toyota | | | | | | | | TAL; 15 | | | | | | | | | | | | | | | | | | | | | | | | | | 28th | 593 |
| 2012 | Casey Roderick | 24 | Chevrolet | | | | | | | | | DAR; 40 | IOW; 20 | CLT; 21 | | | ROA; 32 | | | | | | | | | | | | | | | | | | | | 28th | 593 |
| 2012 | Casey Roderick | 24 | Toyota | | | | | | | | | | | | | | | | DAY; 27 | | | | | | | | | | | | | | | | | | 28th | 593 |
| 2012 | Tim Bainey Jr. | 24 | Chevy | | | | | | | | | | | | DOV; 28 | | | | | | | | | | | | | | | | | | | | | | 28th | 593 |
| 2012 | Angela Ruch | 24 | Chevy | | | | | | | | | | | | | MCH; 28 | | | | | | | | | | | | | | | | | | | | | 28th | 593 |
| 2012 | Jamie Mosley | 24 | Chevy | | | | | | | | | | | | | | | KEN; 29 | | | | | | | | | | | | | | | | | | | 28th | 593 |
| 2012 | Amber Cope | 24 | Chevy | | | | | | | | | | | | | | | | | NHA; 26 | | | | | | | | | | | | | | | | | 28th | 593 |
| 2012 | Kenny Wallace | 24 | Toyota | | | | | | | | | | | | | | | | | | | IND; 19 | | | | | | | | | | | | | | | 28th | 593 |
| 2012 | Scott Saunders | 24 | Chevy | | | | | | | | | | | | | | | | | | | | IOW; 28 | | | | | | | | | | | | | | 28th | 593 |
| 2012 | Tim Connolly | 24 | Chevy | | | | | | | | | | | | | | | | | | | | | GLN; 25 | | | | | | | | | | | | | 28th | 593 |
| 2012 | Derek White | 24 | Chevy | | | | | | | | | | | | | | | | | | | | | | CGV; 18 | | | | | | | | | | | | 28th | 593 |
| 2012 | Derek White | 24 | Toyota | | | | | | | | | | | | | | | | | | | | | | | | | RCH; 34 | | | | | KAN; 34 | | PHO; 29 | | 28th | 593 |
| 2012 | Blake Koch | 24 | Toyota | | | | | | | | | | | | | | | | | | | | | | | | | | | | DOV; 22 | | | | | | 28th | 593 |
| 2012 | David Starr | 24 | Toyota | | | | | | | | | | | | | | | | | | | | | | | | | | | | | CLT; 25 | | TEX; 23 | | HOM; 24 | 28th | 593 |
| 2013 | Blake Koch | 24 | Toyota | DAY; 38 | PHO; 16 | LVS; 21 | BRI; 25 | CAL; 32 | TEX; 24 | RCH; 25 | | | | | | MCH; 22 | | | | | CHI; 27 | | | | | BRI; 31 | | | | | | | | | | | 31st | 468 |
| 2013 | Jason White | 24 | Toyota | | | | | | | | TAL; 8 | | CLT; 39 | DOV; 32 | | | | | DAY; 35 | | | | | | | | | | | | | | | | | | 31st | 468 |
| 2013 | Bryan Silas | 24 | Toyota | | | | | | | | | DAR; 36 | | | | | | | | | | | | | | | | | | | | | | | | | 31st | 468 |
| 2013 | Ken Butler III | 24 | Toyota | | | | | | | | | | | | IOW; 26 | | | KEN; 24 | | | | IND; 32 | | | | | ATL; 28 | | | | | KAN; 32 | CLT; 39 | | | | 31st | 468 |
| 2013 | Derek White | 24 | Toyota | | | | | | | | | | | | | | ROA; 36 | | | | | | | GLN; 25 | | | | | | | | | | | | | 31st | 468 |
| 2013 | Brett Butler | 24 | Toyota | | | | | | | | | | | | | | | | | NHA; 36 | | | IOW; 33 | | | | | | CHI; 34 | | | | | | | | 31st | 468 |
| 2013 | Alex Kennedy | 24 | Toyota | | | | | | | | | | | | | | | | | | | | | | MOH; 29 | | | | | | | | | | | | 31st | 468 |
| 2013 | Ryan Ellis | 24 | Toyota | | | | | | | | | | | | | | | | | | | | | | | | | RCH; 31 | | KEN; 35 | DOV; 32 | | | TEX; 35 | | HOM; 36 | 31st | 468 |
| 2013 | Kelly Admiraal | 24 | Toyota | | | | | | | | | | | | | | | | | | | | | | | | | | | | | | | | PHO; 31 | | 31st | 468 |
| 2014 | Harrison Rhodes | 24 | Toyota | DAY; 39 | | | | | | | | | | | | | | | | | | | | | | | | | | | | | | | | | 47th | 63 |
| 2014 | Rubén García Jr. | 24 | Toyota | | PHO; 25 | | BRI; 33 | | | | | | | | | | | | | | | | | | | | | | | | | | | | | | 47th | 63 |
| 2014 | Ryan Ellis | 24 | Toyota | | | LVS; 28 | | | | | | | | | | | | | | | | | | | | | | | | | | | | | | | 47th | 63 |
| 2014 | Jason White | 24 | Toyota | | | | | CAL; 32 | TEX | DAR | RCH | TAL | IOW | CLT | DOV | MCH | ROA | KEN | DAY | NHA | CHI | IND | IOW | GLN | MOH | BRI | ATL | RCH | CHI | KEN | DOV | KAN | CLT | TEX | PHO | HOM | 47th | 63 |

Car No. 27 history

The No. 27 Toyota made its debut at the Jeff Foxworthy's Grit Chips 300 at Bristol Motor Speedway in 2013, with Michael McDowell. It was primarily run as a start and park car.

=== Car No. 27 results ===
NASCAR Nationwide Series results
| Year | Driver | No. | Make | 1 | 2 | 3 | 4 | 5 | 6 | 7 | 8 | 9 | 10 | 11 | 12 | 13 | 14 | 15 | 16 | 17 | 18 | 19 | 20 | 21 | 22 | 23 | 24 | 25 | 26 | 27 | 28 | 29 | 30 | 31 | 32 | 33 | Owners | Pts |
|---|---|---|---|---|---|---|---|---|---|---|---|---|---|---|---|---|---|---|---|---|---|---|---|---|---|---|---|---|---|---|---|---|---|---|---|---|---|---|
| 2013 | Michael McDowell | 27 | Toyota | DAY | PHO; Wth | LVS | BRI; 40 | CAL; 36 | | | | | | | | | | | | | | | | | | | | | | | | | | | | | 61st | 12 |
| 2013 | Jason White | 27 | Toyota | | | | | | TEX; DNQ | RCH | | | | | | | | | | | | | | | | | | | | | | | | | | | 61st | 12 |
| 2013 | David Green | 27 | Toyota | | | | | | | | TAL; Wth | DAR | CLT | DOV | IOW | MCH | ROA | KEN | DAY | NHA | CHI | IND | IOW | GLN | MOH | BRI | ATL | RCH | CHI | KEN | DOV | KAN | CLT | TEX | PHO | HOM | 61st | 12 |
