= Chad Walter =

NASCAR crew chief (born 1971)

Personal information
- Full name: Charles David Walter
- Born: June 10, 1971 (age 55) Albion, New York, U.S.

Sport
- Country: United States
- Sport: NASCAR FedEx Freight Truck Series
- Team: 15. Tricon Garage

Charles David Walter (born June 10, 1971) is an American NASCAR crew chief who works for Tricon Garage as the crew chief of their No. 15 Toyota Tundra in the NASCAR FedEx Freight Truck Series.

== Racing career ==
=== 2005–2008: Hendrick Motorsports and JR Motorsports ===
Walter landed his first crew chiefing job in 2005, calling the shots for Hendrick Motorsports' No. 5 Busch Series team with drivers Kyle Busch, Jimmie Johnson, Adrián Fernández, Kyle Krisiloff, and Justin Labonte in 2005 and 2006. He had previously worked as an engineer for Hendrick as well as Dale Earnhardt, Inc.

Walter was the crew chief for the No. 24 Hendrick Motorsports Chevrolet in the Busch Series in 2007, working with drivers Casey Mears and Landon Cassill. In 2008, when Hendrick's Nationwide team merged into JR Motorsports, Walter moved to JRM. Since the No. 24 team was shut down as part of the merger, he became crew chief of the No. 5 car, replacing Mike Bumgarner, who remained with Hendrick.

In late February 2008, Walter was suspended for six races for having an illegal rear spoiler in the opening inspection on Dale Earnhardt Jr.'s racecar. He was fined $25,000 and placed on probation until December 31, 2008. He resigned from JR Motorsports in July 2008 before the race at IRP.

=== 2009–2012: Penske Racing ===
After not working for any team for the remainder of 2008, Walter joined Penske Racing's No. 12 Nationwide Series team as the crew chief for rookie Justin Allgaier for the 2009 season. They did not win any races that year, but they finished sixth in points. The duo remained together in 2010, and they did score their first win at the spring Bristol race. Allgaier finished fourth in points and was the highest finishing Nationwide Series regular in the standings.

Due to sponsor Verizon leaving NASCAR after 2010, the No. 12 team could not find enough sponsorship, and Allgaier left for Turner Motorsports for 2011. However, Walter remained with Penske and continued to crew chief the same car when it was fielded part-time for Sam Hornish Jr. Hornish would run twelve races that year, picking up one win at Phoenix towards the end of the season. Additional sponsorship was found after they scored that win, which enabled the team to go back to full-time in 2012. Despite finishing fourth in the standings, Hornish went winless.

=== 2013–2019: Michael Waltrip Racing, Tommy Baldwin Racing, Richard Childress Racing & DGR-Crosley ===
Walter left for Michael Waltrip Racing in 2013 to work as an engineer. He returned to crew chiefing when MWR fielded a third part-time car, the No. 66, for owner Michael Waltrip, Brett Moffitt, and Jeff Burton, who joined MWR from Richard Childress Racing after semi-retiring.

When MWR closed down after 2015, Walter was picked up by Tommy Baldwin Racing to work on their No. 7 car as the head of engineering. However, TBR would also go on to close down (after 2016), leaving him without a job again.

According to his LinkedIn profile, Walter joined Richard Childress Racing as an engineer in 2017, where according to Racing-Reference, he also served for one race at Talladega as the interim crew chief for Daniel Hemric's No. 21 Xfinity Series team. After one year with RCR, he moved to DGR-Crosley starting in 2018, where he also served as an engineer.

Before the 2019 season, Walter was supposed to be the car chief for Ty Gibbs' No. 17 team in the K&N East Series for DGR-Crosley, but ahead of the season, he was given another hefty suspension, this time for illegally testing in January of that year. His L-6 suspension was originally indefinitely, but the team appealed and the suspension was reduced. It is unclear when exactly he was reinstated by NASCAR, but after returning, he served as the engineer for Tyler Ankrum's No. 17 team in the Truck Series.

=== 2020–2023: GMS Racing and Our Motorsports ===
Walter returned to crew chiefing in 2020, leaving DGR-Crosley to join GMS Racing to work on their new No. 26 truck, driven by Ankrum after he also left DGR. In 2021, GMS switched Walter and their No. 24 crew chief Charles Denike, with Walter becoming the crew chief of the No. 24, now driven by Raphaël Lessard, and Denike becoming the crew chief for the No. 26 of Ankrum.

Walter left GMS to be the crew chief for Our Motorsports' new No. 27 car in the Xfinity Series in 2022, driven by Jeb Burton.

Walter returned to GMS Racing in 2023 to be the crew chief for Rajah Caruth in the No. 24 truck.

=== 2024–2026: Spire Motorsports ===
GMS closed down after the 2023 season and Caruth and Walter moved to Spire Motorsports in 2024 to drive and crew chief the team's new No. 71 truck, respectively. They won their first race together at Las Vegas in March. In 2025, Spire moved Walter from Caruth's No. 71 truck to their No. 77 truck, driven by rookie Andrés Pérez de Lara, the defending ARCA Menards Series champion. He replaced Jason Trinchere as crew chief of the No. 77 truck, who left to crew chief for Haas Factory Team on their No. 41 car driven by Sam Mayer in the Xfinity Series. Corey LaJoie would later finish the year in the No. 77 truck after Pérez de Lara left for Niece Motorsports.

Walter returned as the crew chief of the No. 77 truck in 2026.

=== 2027–present: Tricon Garage ===
Walter moved from Spire to Tricon Garage for 2027 to crew chief their No. 15 truck driven by Sammy Smith. Smith joined the team from JR Motorsports in the O'Reilly Auto Parts Series and Walter replaced Jeff Hensley, who could not finish the 2026 season after getting sepsis.

== Personal life ==
Walter attended Cornell University where he joined the Formula Society of Automotive Engineers' race car design team. His design team won the national championship twice, enhancing his love for racing. He is married to Sherry Walter.
