= 2012 Indiana 250 =

Race details
- Map of Speedway
- Date: July 28, 2012
- Official name: 2012 Indiana 250
- Location: Indianapolis Motor Speedway in Speedway, Indiana
- Course: Oval
- Course length: 2.5 miles (4.0 km)
- Distance: 100 laps, 250 mi (402.336 km)
- Weather: Clear
- Average speed: 126.050 mph (202.858 km/h)
- Attendance: 40,000

Pole position
Driver	Kasey Kahne	Turner Motorsports
- Time: 51.054

Most laps led
Driver	Kyle Busch	Kyle Busch Motorsports
- Laps: 51

Winner
No. 22	Brad Keselowski	Penske Racing

Television in the United States
- Network: ESPN
- Announcers: Marty Reid, Dale Jarrett, Andy Petree

The 2012 Indiana 250 was a NASCAR Nationwide Series race held at Indianapolis Motor Speedway in Speedway, Indiana on July 28, 2012. The race was the first ever race at the Indianapolis Motor Speedway for the Nationwide Series. It was also the 19th race of the 2012 NASCAR Nationwide Series. Kasey Kahne won the pole for the race while Kyle Busch led the most laps. But it was Brad Keselowski who would win the first ever Nationwide Series race at Indianapolis where his owner Roger Penske has 15 Indianapolis 500 wins as an owner at the time.

== Background ==
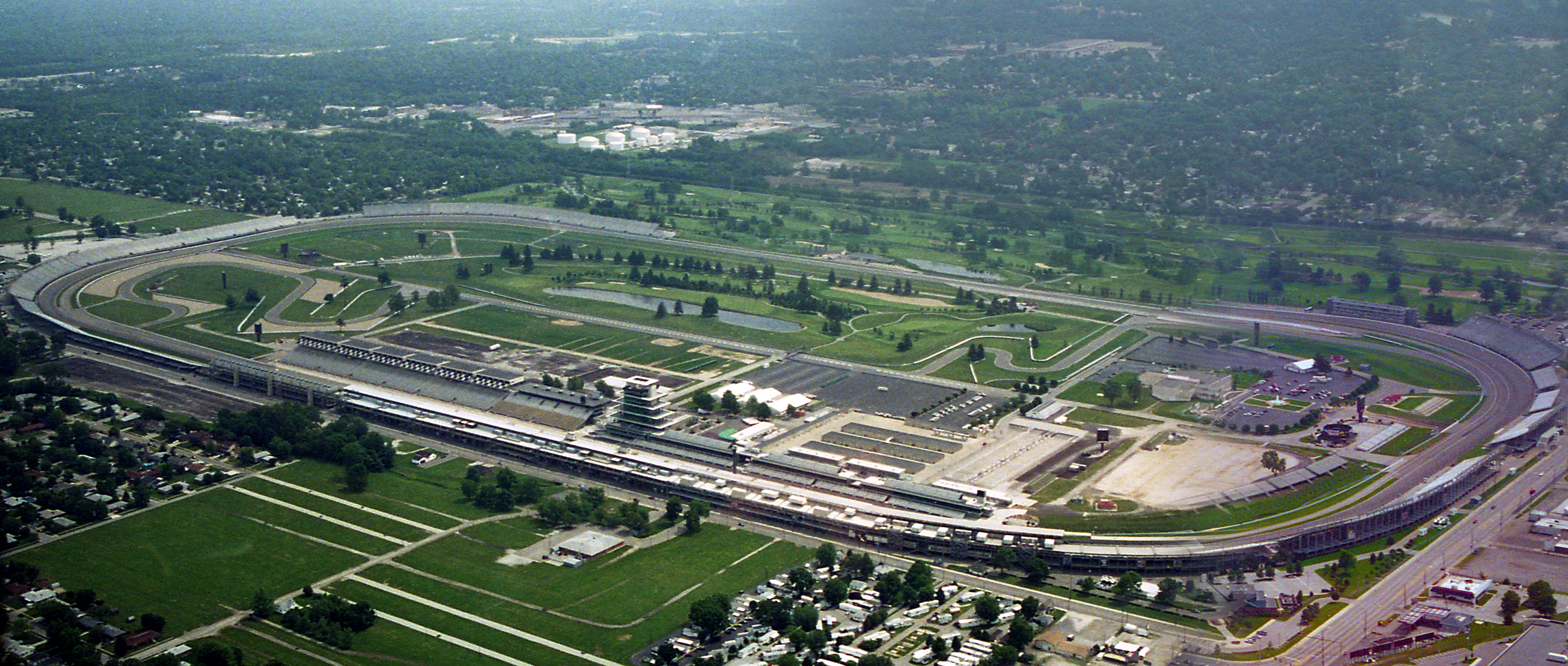
Indianapolis Motor Speedway, the track where the race was held.

The Indianapolis Motor Speedway, located in Speedway, Indiana, (an enclave suburb of Indianapolis) in the United States, is the home of the Indianapolis 500 and the Brickyard 400. It is located on the corner of 16th Street and Georgetown Road, approximately six miles (10 km) west of Downtown Indianapolis.

Constructed in 1909, it is the original speedway, the first racing facility so named. It has a permanent seating capacity estimated at 235,000 with infield seating raising capacity to an approximate 400,000. It is the highest-capacity sports venue in the world.

=== Entry list ===
- (R) denotes rookie driver
- (i) denotes driver who is ineligible for series driver points

#	Driver	Team	Make
01	Mike Wallace	JD Motorsports	Chevrolet
1	Kurt Busch (i)	Phoenix Racing	Chevrolet
2	Elliott Sadler	Richard Childress Racing	Chevrolet
3	Austin Dillon (R)	Richard Childress Racing	Chevrolet
4	Jeremy Clements	Jeremy Clements Racing	Chevrolet
6	Ricky Stenhouse Jr.	Roush Fenway Racing	Ford
7	Danica Patrick	JR Motorsports	Chevrolet
08	Kyle Fowler	Randy Hill Racing	Ford
10	Jeff Green	TriStar Motorsports	Toyota
11	Brian Scott	Joe Gibbs Racing	Toyota
12	Sam Hornish Jr.	Penske Racing	Dodge
14	Eric McClure	TriStar Motorsports	Toyota
15	Scott Riggs (i)	Rick Ware Racing	Ford
18	Denny Hamlin (i)	Joe Gibbs Racing	Toyota
19	Tayler Malsam	TriStar Motorsports	Toyota
20	Joey Logano (i)	Joe Gibbs Racing	Toyota
22	Brad Keselowski (i)	Penske Racing	Dodge
23	Robert Richardson Jr.	R3 Motorsports	Chevrolet
24	Kenny Wallace	SR² Motorsports	Toyota
30	James Buescher (i)	Turner Motorsports	Chevrolet
31	Justin Allgaier	Turner Motorsports	Chevrolet
33	Paul Menard (i)	Richard Childress Racing	Chevrolet
36	Ryan Blaney (i)	Tommy Baldwin Racing	Chevrolet
38	Kasey Kahne (i)	Turner Motorsports	Chevrolet
39	Jeffrey Earnhardt	Rick Ware Racing	Chevrolet
40	Erik Darnell	The Motorsports Group	Chevrolet
41	Timmy Hill	Rick Ware Racing	Ford
42	Josh Wise (i)	The Motorsports Group	Chevrolet
43	Michael Annett	Richard Petty Motorsports	Ford
44	Mike Bliss	TriStar Motorsports	Toyota
46	Chase Miller	The Motorsports Group	Chevrolet
47	Stephen Leicht (i)	The Motorsports Group	Chevrolet
50	T. J. Bell	MAKE Motorsports	Chevrolet
51	Ty Dillon (i)	Richard Childress Racing	Chevrolet
52	Tim Schendel	Hamilton Means Racing	Chevrolet
54	Kyle Busch (i)	Kyle Busch Motorsports	Toyota
70	Johanna Long (R)	ML Motorsports	Chevrolet
74	Mike Harmon	Mike Harmon Racing	Chevrolet
81	Jason Bowles (R)	MacDonald Motorsports	Toyota
86	Kevin Lepage	Deware Racing Group	Ford
87	Joe Nemechek	NEMCO Motorsports	Toyota
88	Cole Whitt (R)	JR Motorsports	Chevrolet
89	Morgan Shepherd	Shepherd Racing Ventures	Chevrolet
98	Reed Sorenson	Biagi-DenBeste Racing	Ford
99	Travis Pastrana	RAB Racing	Toyota
Official Entry list

== Qualifying ==
Kasey Kahne won the pole for the race with a time of 51.054 and a speed of 176.284.

Grid	No.	Driver	Team	Manufacturer	Time	Speed
1	38	Kasey Kahne (i)	Turner Motorsports	Chevrolet	51.054	176.284
2	54	Kyle Busch (i)	Kyle Busch Motorsports	Toyota	51.125	176.039
3	51	Ty Dillon (i)	Richard Childress Racing	Chevrolet	51.225	175.695
4	18	Denny Hamlin (i)	Joe Gibbs Racing	Toyota	51.251	175.606
5	2	Elliott Sadler	Richard Childress Racing	Chevrolet	51.259	175.579
6	20	Joey Logano (i)	Joe Gibbs Racing	Toyota	51.370	175.200
7	3	Austin Dillon (R)	Richard Childress Racing	Chevrolet	51.378	175.172
8	22	Brad Keselowski (i)	Penske Racing	Dodge	51.465	174.876
9	33	Paul Menard (i)	Richard Childress Racing	Chevrolet	51.468	174.866
10	6	Ricky Stenhouse Jr.	Roush Fenway Racing	Ford	51.518	174.696
11	36	Ryan Blaney (i)	Tommy Baldwin Racing	Chevrolet	51.596	174.432
12	44	Mike Bliss	TriStar Motorsports	Toyota	51.601	174.415
13	12	Sam Hornish Jr.	Penske Racing	Dodge	51.652	174.243
14	31	Justin Allgaier	Turner Motorsports	Chevrolet	51.813	173.702
15	11	Brian Scott	Joe Gibbs Racing	Toyota	51.990	173.110
16	4	Jeremy Clements	Jeremy Clements Racing	Chevrolet	52.005	173.060
17	70	Johanna Long (R)	ML Motorsports	Chevrolet	52.078	172.818
18	1	Kurt Busch (i)	Phoenix Racing	Chevrolet	52.110	172.712
19	99	Travis Pastrana	RAB Racing	Toyota	52.138	172.619
20	7	Danica Patrick	JR Motorsports	Chevrolet	52.169	172.516
21	43	Michael Annett	Richard Petty Motorsports	Ford	52.261	172.213
22	19	Tayler Malsam	TriStar Motorsports	Toyota	52.305	172.068
23	01	Mike Wallace	JD Motorsports	Chevrolet	52.520	171.363
24	81	Jason Bowles (R)	MacDonald Motorsports	Toyota	52.577	171.178
25	30	James Buescher (i)	Turner Motorsports	Chevrolet	52.595	171.119
26	24	Kenny Wallace	SR² Motorsports	Toyota	52.602	171.096
27	98	Reed Sorenson	Biagi-DenBeste Racing	Ford	52.675	170.859
28	87	Joe Nemechek	NEMCO Motorsports	Toyota	52.910	170.100
29	08	Kyle Fowler	Randy Hill Racing	Ford	52.996	169.824
30	46	Chase Miller	The Motorsports Group	Chevrolet	53.069	169.591
31	42	Josh Wise (i)	The Motorsports Group	Chevrolet	53.089	169.527
32	47	Stephen Leicht (i)	The Motorsports Group	Chevrolet	53.124	169.415
33	40	Erik Darnell	The Motorsports Group	Chevrolet	53.181	169.233
34	14	Eric McClure	TriStar Motorsports	Toyota	53.187	169.214
35	10	Jeff Green	TriStar Motorsports	Toyota	53.271	168.947
36	86	Kevin Lepage	Deware Racing Group	Ford	53.332	168.754
37	41	Timmy Hill	Rick Ware Racing	Ford	53.547	168.077
38	15	Scott Riggs (i)	Rick Ware Racing	Ford	53.600	167.910
39	39	Jeffrey Earnhardt	Rick Ware Racing	Chevrolet	53.712	167.560
40	88	Cole Whitt (R)	JR Motorsports	Chevrolet	53.723	167.526
41	52	Tim Schendel	Hamilton Means Racing	Chevrolet	53.869	167.072
42	23	Robert Richardson Jr.*	R3 Motorsports	Chevrolet	54.726	164.456
43	50	T. J. Bell	MAKE Motorsports	Chevrolet	54.690	164.564
Failed to qualify, withdrew, or driver changes
44	74	Mike Harmon	Mike Harmon Racing	Chevrolet	55.073	163.419
45	89	Morgan Shepherd	Shepherd Racing Ventures	Chevrolet	55.152	163.185
Official Starting grid

* – Made the field via owners points

== Race ==
Outside pole sitter Kyle Busch took the lead from pole sitter Kasey Kahne after Kahne had trouble getting up to speed on the start and Busch led the first lap. The first caution would fly on lap 15 for it being the competition caution. Denny Hamlin won the race off of pit road and he led the field to the restart on lap 22. On lap 23, Brad Keselowski took the lead from Hamlin. On lap 27, Kyle Busch took the lead from Keselowski. Green flag pitstops soon began around lap 36. Kyle Busch pitted on lap 37 and gave the lead to Kasey Kahne. On lap 39, the second caution would fly for the first accident of the day when Danica Patrick bumped Reed Sorenson in turn 1 and spun Sorenson. Sorenson overcorrected back the right and collected Patrick in the process. Kyle Busch was the new leader and Busch led the field to the restart on lap 48. Busch was looking for his first Nationwide Series win of the season.

=== Final laps ===
But with 38 laps to go, the 3rd caution would fly for debris. Sam Hornish Jr. won the race off of pit road and he led the field to the restart with 33 laps to go. With 29 laps to go, Brad Keselowski took the lead from Hornish which would be the last lead change of the race. With 27 to go, the 4th caution would fly when Brian Scott got loose in turn 4 and spun and collected Ty Dillon giving Dillon damage. The race would restart with 22 laps to go. But on the restart, the 5th and final caution would fly when Kyle Busch got loose under Sam Hornish Jr. and spun off of turn 1 and barely missed the inside wall in the process. But the spin would cost Busch a chance at victory. The race would restart with 18 laps to go. On the restart, Elliott Sadler took the lead from Keselowski, or so he thought. Sadler ended up getting black flagged by NASCAR for passing Keselowski before the start-finish line since Keselowski was the leader. But Sadler argued that Keselowski spun the tires which would have been clean restart for Sadler. Sadler argued until with 12 laps to go when he decided to pit after he was warned he was going to be disqualified for not obeying NASCAR's order. Keselowski pulled away from second place and Keselowski would win the first ever Nationwide Series race at Indianapolis. The win would be Keselowski's 3rd of the season and gave his owner Roger Penske, whose won 15 Indianapolis 500's as an owner in IndyCar, his first win at Indianapolis in all of NASCAR. Sam Hornish Jr., Ty Dillon, Denny Hamlin, and Austin Dillon rounded out the top 5 while Michael Annett, Joey Logano, Paul Menard, Ricky Stenhouse Jr., and Jeremy Clements rounded out the top 10.

== Race results ==
Pos	Car	Driver	Team	Manufacturer	Laps Run	Laps Led	Status	Points
1	22	Brad Keselowski (i)	Penske Racing	Dodge	100	33	running	0
2	12	Sam Hornish Jr.	Penske Racing	Dodge	100	7	running	43
3	51	Ty Dillon (i)	Richard Childress Racing	Chevrolet	100	0	running	0
4	18	Denny Hamlin (i)	Joe Gibbs Racing	Toyota	100	4	running	0
5	3	Austin Dillon (R)	Richard Childress Racing	Chevrolet	100	0	running	39
6	43	Michael Annett	Richard Petty Motorsports	Ford	100	0	running	38
7	20	Joey Logano (i)	Joe Gibbs Racing	Toyota	100	0	running	0
8	33	Paul Menard (i)	Richard Childress Racing	Chevrolet	100	0	running	0
9	6	Ricky Stenhouse Jr.	Roush Fenway Racing	Ford	100	0	running	35
10	4	Jeremy Clements	Jeremy Clements Racing	Chevrolet	100	0	running	34
11	44	Mike Bliss	TriStar Motorsports	Toyota	100	0	running	33
12	31	Justin Allgaier	Turner Motorsports	Chevrolet	100	0	running	32
13	99	Travis Pastrana	RAB Racing	Toyota	100	0	running	31
14	11	Brian Scott	Joe Gibbs Racing	Chevrolet	100	0	running	30
15	2	Elliott Sadler	Richard Childress Racing	Chevrolet	100	0	running	29
16	81	Jason Bowles (R)	MacDonald Motorsports	Toyota	100	0	running	28
17	88	Cole Whitt (R)	JR Motorsports	Chevrolet	100	0	running	27
18	87	Joe Nemechek	NEMCO Motorsports	Toyota	100	0	running	26
19	24	Kenny Wallace	SR² Motorsports	Toyota	100	0	running	25
20	01	Mike Wallace	JD Motorsports	Chevrolet	100	0	running	24
21	39	Jeffrey Earnhardt	Rick Ware Racing	Chevrolet	100	0	running	23
22	54	Kyle Busch (i)	Kyle Busch Motorsports	Toyota	100	51	running	0
23	41	Timmy Hill	Rick Ware Racing	Ford	100	0	running	21
24	14	Eric McClure	TriStar Motorsports	Toyota	100	0	running	20
25	38	Kasey Kahne (i)	Turner Motorsports	Chevrolet	99	4	running	0
26	30	James Buescher (i)	Turner Motorsports	Chevrolet	99	0	running	0
27	36	Ryan Blaney (i)	Tommy Baldwin Racing	Chevrolet	99	0	running	0
28	52	Tim Schendel	Hamilton Means Racing	Chevrolet	99	0	running	16
29	19	Tayler Malsam	TriStar Motorsports	Toyota	99	0	running	15
30	70	Johanna Long (R)	ML Motorsports	Chevrolet	90	0	running	14
31	23	Robert Richardson Jr.	R3 Motorsports	Chevrolet	79	0	running	13
32	08	Kyle Fowler	Randy Hill Racing	Ford	72	0	engine	12
33	98	Reed Sorenson	Biagi-DenBeste Racing	Ford	49	0	crash	11
34	1	Kurt Busch (i)	Phoenix Racing	Chevrolet	41	0	electrical	0
35	7	Danica Patrick	JR Motorsports	Chevrolet	39	0	crash	9
36	10	Jeff Green	TriStar Motorsports	Toyota	23	1	vibration	9
37	15	Scott Riggs (i)	Rick Ware Racing	Ford	18	0	rear gear	0
38	40	Erik Darnell	The Motorsports Group	Chevrolet	17	0	engine	6
39	50	T. J. Bell	MAKE Motorsports	Chevrolet	10	0	overheating	5
40	86	Kevin Lepage	Deware Racing Group	Ford	8	0	drive shaft	4
41	46	Chase Miller	The Motorsprots Group	Chevrolet	6	0	vibration	3
42	42	Josh Wise (i)	The Motorsports Group	Chevrolet	4	0	electrical	0
43	47	Stephen Leicht (i)	The Motorsports Group	Chevrolet	0	0	engine	0
Official Race results

Previous race: 2012 STP 300	NASCAR Nationwide Series; 2012 season	Next race: 2012 U.S. Cellular 250
