= Adam Stevens (NASCAR) =

American NASCAR crew chief (born 1978)

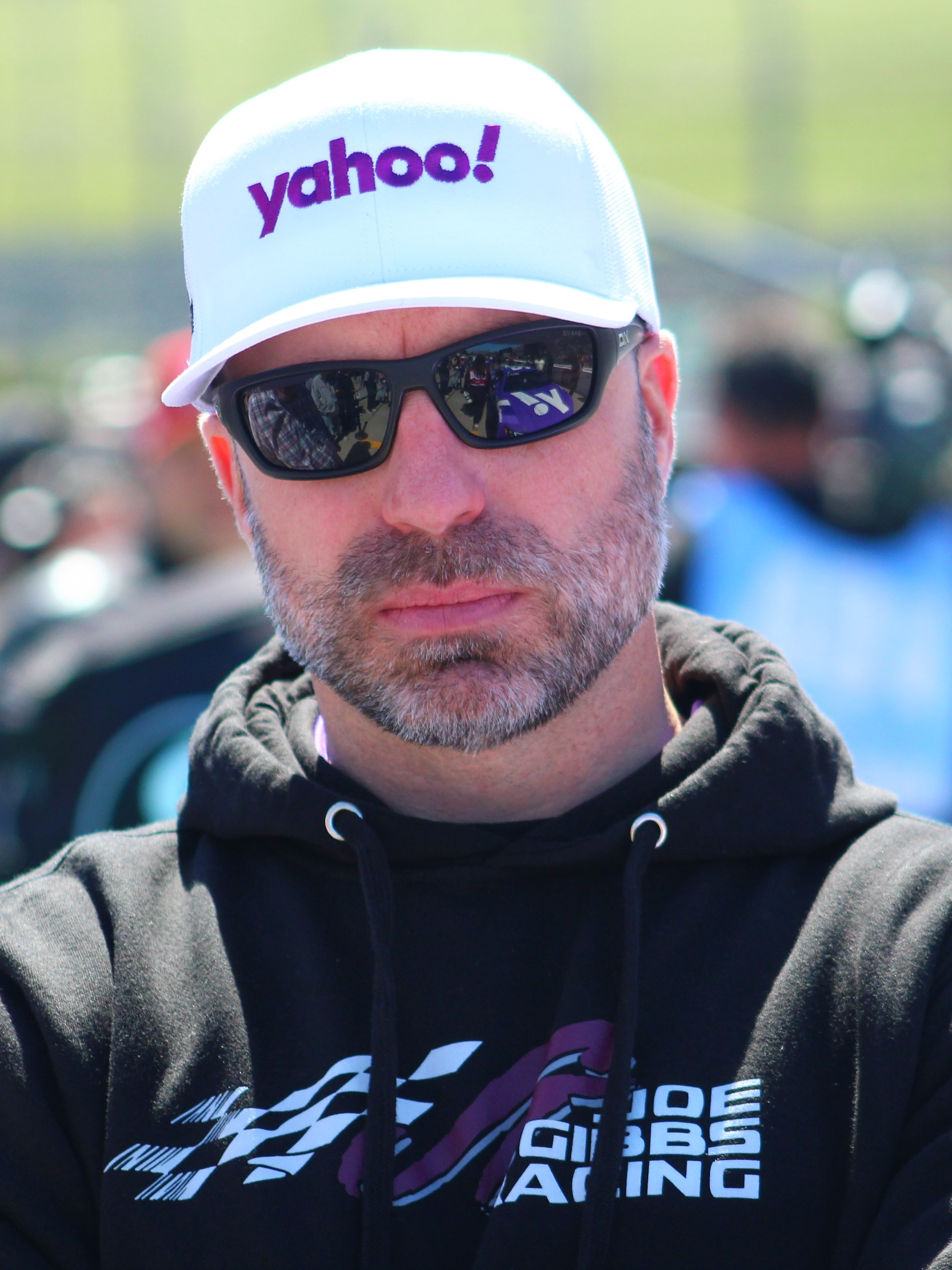
- Stevens at Martinsville Speedway in 2024

Personal information
- Born: Adam Gregory Stevens; July 22, 1978 (age 48) Portsmouth, Ohio, U.S.
- Occupation: Crew chief
- Years active: 1999–present

Sport
- Sport: Auto racing
- League: NASCAR Cup Series
- Team: 20. Joe Gibbs Racing

Adam Gregory Stevens (born July 22, 1978) is a NASCAR Cup Series crew chief for Christopher Bell since 2021. He won the 2015 and 2019 NASCAR Cup Series championship with Kyle Busch and won the 2024 Coca-Cola 600 with Bell.

== Early life ==
Stevens caught the racing bug at a tender, young age from his father Greg Stevens, who raced dune buggies and dirt late model cars. Together, they would go to a nearby race shop with any spare time that they had and they would tinker. Stevens raced at Skyline Speedway in Stewart, Ohio and other dirt tracks in his home state throughout high school and college. In 1999, Stevens raced in one of the biggest dirt Late Model races in the country – The Dirt Late Model Dream at Eldora Speedway in Rossburg, Ohio. Stevens attended Ohio University on his way to earning his bachelor's degree in mechanical engineering in 2002. After realizing during his college years that a driving career wasn't for him, Stevens headed south during the summer break from school to the heart of the NASCAR industry, Charlotte, North Carolina. There, he would go door-to-door, handing out resumes at race shops with hope of landing a job with a NASCAR team upon graduation.

== NASCAR career ==
=== Early career ===
After graduating from Ohio University in the spring of 2002 with his mechanical engineering degree in hand, Stevens’ persistence paid off in August when he landed his first job in NASCAR with Petty Enterprises as a designer. Stevens worked at Petty Enterprises for three years.

=== Joe Gibbs Racing: 2005–present ===
==== Xfinity Team ====
In 2005, Joe Gibbs Racing (JGR) was undergoing an expansion from a two-car team with the Nos. 18 and 20 cars to a third team with the No. 11 car with Jason Leffler. It was looking for race engineers, where he landed with the No. 20 car driven by Tony Stewart with Greg Zipadelli as crew chief. After serving as race engineer with Zipadelli and Stewart from 2005 to 2008 – a stint that included 18 wins and a Sprint Cup championship in 2005, Stewart left the team after the 2008 season to become a team owner at Stewart–Haas Racing. This gave Stevens the opportunity to work with rookie driver Joey Logano as his team engineer, with Zipadelli remaining as crew chief for the 2009 and 2010 seasons.

Another big break would come for Stevens at the end of the 2010 season as the JGR Nationwide Series shop underwent an expansion from two to three cars. Stevens was named crew chief in January 2011 for JGR's new No. 20 Xfinity team, for which Logano was the primary driver with a few others taking turns behind the wheel throughout like Denny Hamlin, Michael McDowell and others. While Stevens and Logano got off to a slow start in 2011, recording just one win, they reeled off nine wins the following year in 2012. But change was on the horizon at JGR once again the following year. Matt Kenseth joined in 2013 to drive the No. 20 Sprint Cup Toyota while Logano moved to the No. 22 team at Penske Racing, setting up another crew chief change for the JGR Xfinity program. Busch had raced for his own Kyle Busch Motorsports team in a select number of Xfinity races in 2012 but decided to move his No. 54 ride back to JGR starting in 2013. With the move, JGR decided to pair Stevens with Busch, who is the all-time leader in Xfinity Series wins. It paid dividends right away as the pair combined for 19 wins, 46 top-five finishes, and 47 top-tens in 52 total Xfinity starts together in 2013 and 2014 which included 25 top-fives in 26 starts in 2014.

==== Cup Series ====
===== Kyle Busch: 2015–2020 =====
In 2015, Stevens was paired off with Kyle Busch in the Cup Series and won the title in their first season together, becoming the first crew chief since Jeff Hammond in 1982 to win the championship in his rookie season.

In 2018 and 2019, Busch and Stevens earned the Regular Season Championship trophy. In 2019 at Homestead, Busch and Stevens clinched their second Cup title.

===== Christopher Bell: 2021–present =====
At the end of the 2020 season, it was announced that Stevens and Busch would no longer be paired with each other and that Stevens would crew-chief the No. 20 car, driven by Christopher Bell.

Bell and Stevens started the 2024 season, with wins at Phoenix, Charlotte, and New Hampshire. During NASCAR's break for the Summer Olympics, Stevens suffered a double knee injury while enjoying vacation time with his family. Stevens underwent successful surgery to repair both knees. In his absence, car chief Chris Sherwood would assume at-track crew chief responsibilities.

Bell and Stevens would start the 2025 season with three consecutive wins at Atlanta, COTA, and Phoenix. It would be the first time this achievement would happen in the and the first since the debut of the Next Gen car.

== Personal life ==
Stevens resides in the Charlotte area with his wife Aubrey and his sons Carter and Ryan. He has four sisters- Kristen, Alison, Katherine, and Elizabeth.
