= NASCAR O'Reilly Auto Parts Series at Indianapolis Motor Speedway =

NASCAR Xfinity Series race at the Indianapolis Motor Speedway oval

NASCAR O'Reilly Auto Parts Series at Indianapolis

NASCAR O'Reilly Auto Parts Series
- Venue: Indianapolis Motor Speedway
- Location: Speedway, Indiana, United States

Circuit information
- Surface: Asphalt
- Length: 2.5 mi (4.0 km)
- Turns: 4

Stock car racing events in the NASCAR O'Reilly Auto Parts Series have been held at Indianapolis Motor Speedway, in Speedway, Indiana, since 2012.

== Current race ==
Pennzoil 250
- Corporate sponsor: Pennzoil (title sponsor); Advance Auto Parts (presenting sponsor)
- First race: 2012
- Distance: 250 miles (400 km)
- Laps: 100; Stages 1/2: 30 each Final stage: 40
- Previous names: Indiana 250 (2012–2013, 2019); Lilly Diabetes 250 (2014–2018)
- Most wins (driver): Kyle Busch (4)
- Most wins (team): Joe Gibbs Racing (4)
- Most wins (manufacturer): Chevrolet (5)

The Pennzoil 250 is a NASCAR O'Reilly Auto Parts Series stock car race held at Indianapolis Motor Speedway. Carson Kvapil is the defending race winner.

=== History ===
In 2012, NASCAR announced that their second-tier series would run a race at IMS. It was called the Indiana 250. From 2014 to 2018, the race was known as the Lilly Diabetes 250.

For 2016, as part of the Xfinity "Dash 4 Cash" format, the race was 250 miles in total, but two 20-lap heat races, similar to the Can-Am Duel, was to be added to be run prior to the 60-lap main event.

On January 15, 2020, new track owner Roger Penske announced that the race would move from the oval to the track's infield road course; Penske had purchased the track in late-2019. Despite the switch, the NASCAR Cup Series' Brickyard 400 continued to race on the oval, although the Cup race did move to the road course the next season. Shell plc took over as title sponsor of the race, renaming it the Pennzoil 150 after their Pennzoil brand.

On March 26, 2020, as part of changes to the 2020 IndyCar Series schedule to account for the COVID-19 pandemic, it was announced that the series' GMR Grand Prix—an IMS road course race typically held as a prelude to the Indianapolis 500—would be postponed to July 4, 2020, and form an IndyCar/NASCAR double-header with the Pennzoil 150.

On September 28, 2023, it was announced that the Cup and Xfinity Series races at Indianapolis would return to the oval in 2024, reviving the Brickyard 400 and the Xfinity race known as the Pennzoil 250.

==== Past winners ====
Year	Date	No.	Driver	Team	Manufacturer	Race Distance		Race Time	Average Speed (mph)	Report	Ref
Year	Date	No.	Driver	Team	Manufacturer	Laps	Miles (km)	Race Time	Average Speed (mph)	Report	Ref
2012	July 28	22	Brad Keselowski	Penske Racing	Dodge	100	250 (402.336)	1:59:00	126.05	Report	
2013	July 27	54	Kyle Busch	Joe Gibbs Racing	Toyota	100	250 (402.336)	1:51:26	134.61	Report	
2014	July 26	3	Ty Dillon	Richard Childress Racing	Chevrolet	100	250 (402.336)	1:49:22	137.153	Report	
2015	July 25	54	Kyle Busch	Joe Gibbs Racing	Toyota	100	250 (402.336)	1:49:52	136.529	Report	
2016*	July 23	18	Kyle Busch	Joe Gibbs Racing	Toyota	63*	157.5 (253.471)	1:09:20	136.298	Report	
2017	July 22	9	William Byron	JR Motorsports	Chevrolet	100	250 (402.336)	1:58:50	126.227	Report	
2018	September 10*	7	Justin Allgaier	JR Motorsports	Chevrolet	100	250 (402.336)	2:13:53	112.038	Report	
2019	September 7	18	Kyle Busch	Joe Gibbs Racing	Toyota	100	250 (402.336)	2:11:21	114.199	Report	
2020 – 2023	Race run on road course layout										
2024	July 20	98	Riley Herbst	Stewart–Haas Racing	Ford	100	250 (402.336)	2:28:08	101.260	Report	
2025	July 26	88	Connor Zilisch	JR Motorsports	Chevrolet	100	250 (402.336)	2:22:59	104.907	Report	
2026	July 25	1	Carson Kvapil	JR Motorsports	Chevrolet	100	250 (402.336)	1:56:20	128.94	Report	
2027	July 24									Report	

- 2016: Race split into a 60-lap feature, preceded by 2x20-lap heat races for the Xfinity Dash 4 Cash program; feature extended due to NASCAR overtime.
- 2018: Race postponed from Saturday to Monday due to rain.

===== Multiple winners (drivers) =====
# Wins	Driver	Years won
4	Kyle Busch	2013, 2015–2016, 2019

===== Multiple winners (teams) =====
# Wins	Team	Years won
4	Joe Gibbs Racing	2013, 2015–2016, 2019
4	JR Motorsports	2017–2018, 2025–2026

===== Manufacturer wins =====
# Wins	Make	Years won
5	(United States) Chevrolet	2014, 2017–2018, 2025–2026
4	(Japan) Toyota	2013, 2015–2016, 2019
1	(United States) Dodge	2012
1	(United States) Ford	2024

==== Qualifying race winners ====
Year	Date	No.	Driver	Team	Manufacturer	Race Distance		Race Time	Average Speed (mph)	Ref
Year	Date	No.	Driver	Team	Manufacturer	Laps	Miles (km)	Race Time	Average Speed (mph)	Ref
2016	July 23	18	Kyle Busch	Joe Gibbs Racing	Toyota	20	50 (80.467)	00:17:21	172.911	
2016	July 23	20	Erik Jones	Joe Gibbs Racing	Toyota	20	50 (80.467)	00:17:24	172.414	

== Former road course race ==
Pennzoil 150

NASCAR Xfinity Series
- Venue: Indianapolis Motor Speedway
- Location: Speedway, Indiana, United States
- First race: 2020
- Last race: 2023
- Distance: 151.218 miles (243.362 km)
- Laps: 62; Stages 1/2: 20 each Final stage: 22
- Most wins (manufacturer): Ford (2)

Circuit information
- Surface: Asphalt
- Length: 2.439 mi (3.925 km)
- Turns: 14

The Pennzoil 150 was a NASCAR Xfinity Series auto race held at the Indianapolis Motor Speedway road course from 2020 to 2023. The race was held on the Saturday before the NASCAR Cup Series' Brickyard 400 in 2020 and Verizon 200 from 2021 to 2023. The IndyCar Series' Grand Prix of Indianapolis was also held on the same day as this race in all four years it was run. The Xfinity and Cup Series races at the track were moved back to the oval in 2024, reviving the Pennzoil 250 and the Brickyard 400.

=== History ===
After longtime NASCAR and IndyCar team owner Roger Penske purchased Indianapolis Motor Speedway from the George family in 2019, it announced on January 15, 2020, that the Xfinity Series race at Indianapolis would move from the oval to the track's infield road course. However, the NASCAR Cup Series race at the track would remain on the oval. The Cup Series race would end up moving to the road course the following year. On February 4, 2020, it was announced that Shell plc, a Penske sponsor of their No. 22 Cup Series car driven by Joey Logano, would become the title sponsor of the race, renaming it the Pennzoil 150 after their Pennzoil brand.

On March 26, 2020, as part of changes to the 2020 IndyCar Series schedule due to the COVID-19 pandemic, it was announced that the series' GMR Grand Prix, an IMS road course race typically held as a prelude to the Indianapolis 500, would be postponed to July 4, 2020, and this would form an IndyCar/NASCAR double-header with the Pennzoil 150.

==== Past winners (road course) ====
Year	Date	No.	Driver	Team	Manufacturer	Race Distance		Race Time	Average Speed (mph)	Report	Ref
Year	Date	No.	Driver	Team	Manufacturer	Laps	Miles (km)	Race Time	Average Speed (mph)	Report	Ref
2020	July 4	98	Chase Briscoe	Stewart–Haas Racing	Ford	62	151.218 (243.362)	2:02:48	73.885	Report	
2021	August 14	22	Austin Cindric	Team Penske	Ford	62	151.218 (243.362)	2:02:54	73.825	Report	
2022	July 30	16	A. J. Allmendinger	Kaulig Racing	Chevrolet	62	151.218 (243.362)	1:56:35	77.825	Report	
2023	August 12	19	Ty Gibbs	Joe Gibbs Racing	Toyota	62	151.218 (243.362)	1:57:34	77.174	Report	

==== Manufacturer wins (road course) ====
# Wins	Make	Years won
2	(United States) Ford	2020, 2021
1	(United States) Chevrolet	2022
1	(Japan) Toyota	2023

Previous race: Hy-Vee PERKS 250	NASCAR O'Reilly Auto Parts Series; Pennzoil 250	Next race: United Rentals Driven to Serve 250
