= O'Reilly Auto Parts 300 =

O'Reilly Auto Parts Series 300 may refer to two races:

- NASCAR O'Reilly Auto Parts Series at Texas Motor Speedway
- NASCAR O'Reilly Auto Parts Series at Homestead–Miami Speedway
