= 2017 PowerShares QQQ 300 =

First race of the 2017 NASCAR Xfinity Series

Race details
- Race 1 of 33 in the 2017 NASCAR Xfinity Series season
- Date: February 25, 2017
- Official name: 36th Annual PowerShares QQQ 300
- Location: Daytona International Speedway in Daytona Beach, Florida
- Course: Permanent racing facility
- Course length: 2.500 miles (4.023 km)
- Distance: 120 laps, 300 mi (482.803 km)
- Scheduled distance: 120 laps, 300 mi (482.803 km)
- Average speed: 117.141 miles per hour (188.520 km/h)

Pole position
Driver	Brandon Jones	Richard Childress Racing
- Time: 48.788

Most laps led
Driver	Elliott Sadler	JR Motorsports
- Laps: 40

Winner
No. 16	Ryan Reed	Roush Fenway Racing

Television in the United States
- Network: Fox Sports 1
- Announcers: Adam Alexander, Michael Waltrip, Kevin Harvick

Radio in the United States
- Radio: Motor Racing Network

The 2017 PowerShares QQQ 300 was the 1st race of the 2017 NASCAR Xfinity Series season and the 36th iteration of the event. The race was held on Saturday, February 25, 2017 in Daytona Beach, Florida at Daytona International Speedway, a 2.5 miles (4.0 km) permanent triangular-shaped superspeedway. The race was extended from the scheduled 120 laps to 124 laps due to NASCAR overtime. Roush Fenway Racing driver Ryan Reed took the lead on the final overtime restart and led the final two laps to earn the victory. It was Reed's first win of the season, and the second of his career. To fill out the podium, Kasey Kahne finished 2nd and Austin Dillon finished 3rd.

== Entry list ==
- (R) denotes rookie driver.
- (i) denotes driver who is ineligible for series driver points.

No.	Driver	Team	Make
00	Cole Custer (R)	Stewart–Haas Racing	Ford
0	Garrett Smithley	JD Motorsports	Chevrolet
01	Harrison Rhodes	JD Motorsports	Chevrolet
1	Elliott Sadler	JR Motorsports	Chevrolet
2	Austin Dillon (i)	Richard Childress Racing	Chevrolet
3	Ty Dillon (i)	Richard Childress Racing	Chevrolet
4	Ross Chastain	JD Motorsports	Chevrolet
5	Michael Annett	JR Motorsports	Chevrolet
6	Bubba Wallace	Roush Fenway Racing	Ford
07	Ray Black Jr.	SS-Green Light Racing	Chevrolet
7	Justin Allgaier	JR Motorsports	Chevrolet
8	Jeff Green	B. J. McLeod Motorsports	Chevrolet
9	William Byron (R)	JR Motorsports	Chevrolet
11	Blake Koch	Kaulig Racing	Chevrolet
13	Mark Thompson	MBM Motorsports	Toyota
14	J. J. Yeley	TriStar Motorsports	Toyota
16	Ryan Reed	Roush Fenway Racing	Ford
18	Daniel Suárez (i)	Joe Gibbs Racing	Toyota
19	Matt Tifft (R)	Joe Gibbs Racing	Toyota
20	Erik Jones (i)	Joe Gibbs Racing	Toyota
21	Daniel Hemric (R)	Richard Childress Racing	Chevrolet
22	Brad Keselowski (i)	Team Penske	Ford
23	Spencer Gallagher (R)	GMS Racing	Chevrolet
24	Scott Lagasse Jr.	JGL Racing	Toyota
25	Chris Cockrum	Chris Cockrum Racing	Chevrolet
28	Dakoda Armstrong	JGL Racing	Toyota
33	Brandon Jones	Richard Childress Racing	Chevrolet
39	Ryan Sieg	RSS Racing	Chevrolet
40	Brandon Hightower	MBM Motorsports	Toyota
42	Tyler Reddick	Chip Ganassi Racing	Chevrolet
44	Benny Gordon	TriStar Motorsports	Toyota
46	Anthony Kumpen	Precision Performance Motorsports	Chevrolet
48	Brennan Poole	Chip Ganassi Racing	Chevrolet
51	Jeremy Clements	Jeremy Clements Racing	Chevrolet
52	Joey Gase	Jimmy Means Racing	Chevrolet
62	Brendan Gaughan	Richard Childress Racing	Chevrolet
74	Mike Harmon	Mike Harmon Racing	Dodge
78	Clint King	B. J. McLeod Motorsports	Chevrolet
88	Kasey Kahne (i)	JR Motorsports	Chevrolet
89	Morgan Shepherd	Shepherd Racing Ventures	Chevrolet
90	Mario Gosselin	DGM Racing	Chevrolet
97	Stephen Leicht	Obaika Racing	Chevrolet
98	Aric Almirola (i)	Biagi–DenBeste Racing	Ford
99	David Starr	B. J. McLeod Motorsports	Chevrolet
Official entry list

== Practice ==
=== First practice ===
The first practice session was held on Friday, February 24, 2017 at 1:00 PM EST. Justin Allgaier was the fastest in the first practice session with a time of 46.418 seconds and a speed of 193.890 mph (312.036 km/h).

Pos	No.	Driver	Team	Manufacturer	Time	Speed
1	7	Justin Allgaier	JR Motorsports	Chevrolet	46.418	193.890
2	22	Brad Keselowski (i)	Team Penske	Ford	46.430	193.840
3	42	Tyler Reddick	Chip Ganassi Racing	Chevrolet	46.485	193.611
Official first practice results

=== Final practice ===
The final practice session took place on Friday, February 24, 2017, at 3:05 PM EST. J. J. Yeley was the fastest in the final practice session with a time of 48.127 seconds and a speed of 187.005 mph (300.955 km/h).

Pos	No.	Driver	Team	Manufacturer	Time	Speed
1	14	J. J. Yeley	TriStar Motorsports	Toyota	48.127	187.005
2	4	Ross Chastain	JD Motorsports	Chevrolet	48.134	186.978
3	44	Benny Gordon	TriStar Motorsports	Toyota	48.168	186.846
Official first practice results

== Qualifying ==
Qualifying took place at 10:30 AM EST. Since Daytona International Speedway is at least 2 miles (3.2 km), the qualifying system was a single car, single lap, two round system where in the first round, everyone would set a time to determine positions 13-40. Then, the fastest 12 qualifiers would move on to the second round to determine positions 1-12.

Brandon Jones won the pole with a time of 48.788 seconds and a speed of 184.472 mph (296.879 km/h).

Morgan Shepherd, Mike Harmon, Stephen Leicht, and Mark Thompson failed to qualify.

=== Full starting lineup ===
Pos.	#	Driver	Team	Make	Time (R1)	Speed (R1)	Time (R2)	Speed (R2)
1	33	Brandon Jones	Richard Childress Racing	Chevrolet			48.788	
2	16	Ryan Reed	Roush Fenway Racing	Ford			48.846	
3	48	Brennan Poole	Chip Ganassi Racing	Chevrolet			48.917	
4	21	Daniel Hemric (R)	Richard Childress Racing	Chevrolet			48.952	
5	3	Ty Dillon (i)	Richard Childress Racing	Chevrolet			48.982	
6	22	Brad Keselowski (i)	Team Penske	Ford			49.026	
7	42	Tyler Reddick	Chip Ganassi Racing	Chevrolet			49.041	
8	11	Blake Koch	Kaulig Racing	Chevrolet			49.048	
9	88	Kasey Kahne(i)	JR Motorsports	Chevrolet			49.134	
10	23	Spencer Gallagher (R)	GMS Racing	Chevrolet			49.159	
11	1	Elliott Sadler	JR Motorsports	Chevrolet			49.183	
12	6	Bubba Wallace	Roush Fenway Racing	Ford			49.239	
Eliminated in Round 1
13	5	Michael Annett	JR Motorsports	Chevrolet	49.264		—	—
14	19	Matt Tifft (R)	Joe Gibbs Racing	Toyota	49.277		—	—
15	7	Justin Allgaier	JR Motorsports	Chevrolet	49.307		—	—
16	2	Austin Dillon (i)	Richard Childress Racing	Chevrolet	49.350		—	—
17	9	William Byron (R)	JR Motorsports	Chevrolet	49.360		—	—
18	62	Brendan Gaughan	Richard Childress Racing	Chevrolet	49.466		—	—
19	20	Erik Jones (i)	Joe Gibbs Racing	Toyota	49.485		—	—
20	00	Cole Custer (R)	Stewart–Haas Racing	Ford	49.494		—	—
21	18	Daniel Suárez(i)	Joe Gibbs Racing	Toyota	49.574		—	—
22	44	Aric Almirola (i)	Biagi–DenBeste Racing	Ford	49.742		—	—
23	28	Dakoda Armstrong	JGL Racing	Toyota	49.960		—	—
24	14	J. J. Yeley	TriStar Motorsports	Toyota	49.963		—	—
25	24	Scott Lagasse Jr.	JGL Racing	Toyota	49.976		—	—
26	0	Garrett Smithley	JD Motorsports	Chevrolet	49.997		—	—
27	44	Benny Gordon	TriStar Motorsports	Toyota	50.028		—	—
28	39	Ryan Sieg	RSS Racing	Chevrolet	50.060		—	—
29	4	Benny Gordon	JD Motorsports	Chevrolet	50.090		—	—
30	46	Anthony Kumpen	Precision Performance Motorsports	Chevrolet	50.206		—	—
31	40	Brandon Hightower	MBM Motorsports	Toyota	50.222		—	—
32	25	Chris Cockrum	Chris Cockrum Racing	Chevrolet	50.231		—	—
33	99	David Starr	B. J. McLeod Motorsports	Chevrolet	50.341		—	—
Qualified by owner's points
34	01	Harrison Rhodes	JD Motorsports	Chevrolet	50.542		—	—
35	52	Joey Gase	Jimmy Means Racing	Chevrolet	50.633		—	—
36	07	Ray Black Jr.	SS-Green Light Racing	Chevrolet	50.661		—	—
37	51	Jeremy Clements	Jeremy Clements Racing	Chevrolet	50.669		—	—
38	78	Clint King	B. J. McLeod Motorsports	Chevrolet	51.068		—	—
39	90	Mario Gosselin	DGM Racing	Chevrolet	51.414		—	—
40	8	Jeff Green	B. J. McLeod Motorsports	Chevrolet	50.953		—	—
Failed to qualify
41	89	Morgan Shepherd	Shepherd Racing Ventures	Chevrolet	50.574		—	—
42	74	Mike Harmon	Mike Harmon Racing	Dodge	51.139		—	—
43	97	Stephen Leicht	Obaika Racing	Chevrolet	52.552		—	—
44	13	Mark Thompson	MBM Motorsports	Toyota	—	—	—	—
Official qualifying results
Official starting lineup

== Race results ==
Stage One Laps: 30

Pos	No	Driver	Team	Make	Points
1	1	Elliott Sadler	JR Motorsports	Chevrolet	10
2	88	Kasey Kahne (i)	JR Motorsports	Chevrolet	0
3	48	Brennan Poole	Chip Ganassi Racing	Chevrolet	8
4	3	Ty Dillon (i)	Richard Childress Racing	Chevrolet	0
5	11	Blake Koch	Kaulig Racing	Chevrolet	6
6	19	Matt Tifft (R)	Joe Gibbs Racing	Toyota	5
7	90	Mario Gosselin	DGM Racing	Chevrolet	4
8	28	Dakoda Armstrong	DGM Racing	Toyota	3
9	62	Brendan Gaughan	Richard Childress Racing	Chevrolet	2
10	2	Austin Dillon (i)	Richard Childress Racing	Chevrolet	0

Stage Two Laps: 30

Pos	No	Driver	Team	Make	Points
1	1	Elliott Sadler	JR Motorsports	Chevrolet	10
2	2	Austin Dillon (i)	Richard Childress Racing	Chevrolet	0
3	3	Ty Dillon (i)	Richard Childress Racing	Chevrolet	0
4	16	Ryan Reed	Roush Fenway Racing	Ford	7
5	22	Brad Keselowski (i)	Team Penske	Ford	0
6	88	Kasey Kahne (i)	JR Motorsports	Chevrolet	0
7	62	Brendan Gaughan	Richard Childress Racing	Chevrolet	4
8	28	Dakoda Armstrong	JGL Racing	Chevrolet	3
9	42	Brennan Poole	Chip Ganassi Racing	Chevrolet	2
10	11	Blake Koch	Kaulig Racing	Chevrolet	1

=== Final Stage Results ===
Laps: 60

Pos	No	Driver	Team	Make	Laps	Status	Points
1	16	Ryan Reed	Roush Fenway Racing	Ford	124	Running	47
2	88	Kasey Kahne (i)	JR Motorsports	Chevrolet	124	Running	0
3	2	Austin Dillon (i)	Richard Childress Racing	Chevrolet	124	Running	0
4	22	Brad Keselowski	Team Penske	Ford	124	Running	0
5	62	Brendan Gaughan	Richard Childress Racing	Chevrolet	124	Running	38
6	24	Scott Lagasse Jr.	JGL Racing	Toyota	124	Running	31
7	52	Joey Gase	Jimmy Means Racing	Chevrolet	124	Running	30
8	0	Garrett Smithley	JD Motorsports	Chevrolet	124	Running	29
9	9	William Byron (R)	JR Motorsports	Chevrolet	124	Running	28
10	01	Harrison Rhodes	JD Motorsports	Chevrolet	124	Running	27
11	19	Matt Tifft (R)	Joe Gibbs Racing	Toyota	124	Running	31
12	28	Dakoda Armstrong	JGL Racing	Chevrolet	124	Running	31
13	40	Brandon Hightower	MBM Motorsports	Toyota	124	Running	24
14	5	Michael Annett	JR Motorsports	Chevrolet	124	Running	23
15	11	Blake Koch	Kaulig Racing	Chevrolet	124	Running	29
16	4	Ross Chastain	JD Motorsports	Chevrolet	124	Running	21
17	90	Mario Gosselin	DGM Racing	Chevrolet	124	Running	24
18	07	Ray Black Jr.	SS-Green Light Racing	Chevrolet	124	Running	19
19	3	Ty Dillon (i)	Richard Childress Racing	Chevrolet	124	Running	0
20	42	Tyler Reddick	Chip Ganassi Racing	Chevrolet	122	Running	19
21	39	Ryan Sieg	RSS Racing	Chevrolet	116	Engine	16
22	46	Anthony Kumpen	Precision Performance Motorsports	Chevrolet	111	Overheating	15
23	98	Aric Almirola (i)	Biagi–DenBeste Racing	Ford	108	Vibration	0
24	1	Elliott Sadler	JR Motorsports	Chevrolet	106	Accident	33
25	14	J. J. Yeley	TriStar Motorsports	Toyota	103	Accident	12
26	48	Brennan Poole	Chip Ganassi Racing	Chevrolet	59	Accident	19
27	44	Benny Gordon	TriStar Motorsports	Toyota	35	Running	10
28	25	Chris Cockrum	Chris Cockrum Racing	Chevrolet	32	Running	9
29	33	Brandon Jones	Richard Childress Racing	Chevrolet	28	Accident	8
30	7	Justin Allgaier	JR Motorsports	Chevrolet	28	Accident	7
31	21	Daniel Hemric (R)	Richard Childress Racing	Chevrolet	28	Accident	6
32	20	Erik Jones	Joe Gibbs Racing	Toyota	28	Accident	0
33	6	Bubba Wallace	Roush Fenway Racing	Ford	28	Accident	4
34	18	Daniel Suárez	Joe Gibbs Racing	Toyota	28	Accident	0
35	51	Jeremy Clements	Jeremy Clements Racing	Chevrolet	23	Accident	2
36	23	Spencer Gallagher (R)	GMS Racing	Chevrolet	22	Accident	1
37	00	Cole Custer	Stewart–Haas Racing	Ford	22	Accident	1
38	78	Clint King	B. J. McLeod Motorsports	Chevrolet	22	Accident	1
39	8	Jeff Green	B. J. McLeod Motorsports	Chevrolet	22	Accident	1
40	99	David Starr	B. J. McLeod Motorsports	Chevrolet	4	Accident	1
Official race results

=== Race statistics ===
- Lead changes: 23 among 7 different drivers
- Cautions/Laps: 10 for 42
- Time of race: 2 hours, 38 minutes, and 47 seconds
- Average speed: 117.141 mph (188.520 km/h)

Previous race: 2016 Ford EcoBoost 300	NASCAR Xfinity Series; 2017 season	Next race: 2017 Rinnai 250
