= 2013 U.S. Cellular 250 =

20th race of the 2013 NASCAR Nationwide Series

2013 U.S. Cellular 250 presented by the Enlist Weed Control System
Race details
- Race 20 of 33 of the 2013 NASCAR Nationwide Series
- Date: August 3, 2013
- Official name: 5th Annual U.S. Cellular 250 presented by the Enlist Weed Control System
- Location: Newton, Iowa, Iowa Speedway
- Course: Permanent racing facility
- Course length: 1.408 km (0.875 miles)
- Distance: 250 laps, 218.75 mi (352.044 km)
- Scheduled distance: 250 laps, 218.75 mi (352.044 km)
- Average speed: 112.211 miles per hour (180.586 km/h)

Pole position
Driver	Drew Herring	Joe Gibbs Racing
- Time: 23.270

Most laps led
Driver	Austin Dillon	Richard Childress Racing
- Laps: 116

Winner
No. 22	Brad Keselowski	Penske Racing

Television in the United States
- Network: ESPN
- Announcers: Marty Reid, Ricky Craven

Radio in the United States
- Radio: Motor Racing Network

The 2013 U.S. Cellular 250 presented by the Enlist Weed Control System was the 20th stock car race of the 2013 NASCAR Nationwide Series and the second iteration of the event. The race was held on Saturday, August 3, 2013, in Newton, Iowa at Iowa Speedway, a 7/8 mile (1.4 km) permanent D-shaped oval racetrack. The race took the scheduled 250 laps to complete. At race's end, Brad Keselowski, driving for Penske Racing, would pull away on the final restart with 35 to go to win his 23rd NASCAR Nationwide Series win and his third win of the season. To fill out the podium, Sam Hornish Jr. of Penske Racing and Brian Vickers of Joe Gibbs Racing would finish second and third, respectively.

== Background ==
Iowa Speedway is a 7/8-mile (1.4 km) paved oval motor racing track in Newton, Iowa, United States, approximately 30 miles (48 km) east of Des Moines. The track was designed with influence from Rusty Wallace and patterned after Richmond Raceway, a short track where Wallace was very successful. It has over 25,000 permanent seats as well as a unique multi-tiered Recreational Vehicle viewing area along the backstretch.

=== Entry list ===
- (R) denotes rookie driver.
- (i) denotes driver who is ineligible for series driver points.

#	Driver	Team	Make	Sponsor
00	Blake Koch	SR² Motorsports	Toyota	SR² Motorsports
01	Mike Wallace	JD Motorsports	Chevrolet	G&K Services
2	Brian Scott	Richard Childress Racing	Chevrolet	Shore Lodge
3	Austin Dillon	Richard Childress Racing	Chevrolet	AdvoCare
4	Daryl Harr	JD Motorsports	Chevrolet	iWorld
5	Brad Sweet	JR Motorsports	Chevrolet	Great Clips
6	Trevor Bayne	Roush Fenway Racing	Ford	Fastenal
7	Regan Smith	JR Motorsports	Chevrolet	TaxSlayer
10	Jeff Green	TriStar Motorsports	Toyota	TriStar Motorsports
11	Elliott Sadler	Joe Gibbs Racing	Toyota	Sport Clips Haircuts
12	Sam Hornish Jr.	Penske Racing	Ford	Penske Rental
14	Eric McClure	TriStar Motorsports	Toyota	Reynolds Wrap, Hefty
15	Carl Long	Rick Ware Racing	Ford	Clawdog.com
19	Mike Bliss	TriStar Motorsports	Toyota	Tweaker Energy Shot
20	Brian Vickers	Joe Gibbs Racing	Toyota	Dollar General
22	Brad Keselowski (i)	Penske Racing	Ford	Discount Tire
23	Richard Harriman	Rick Ware Racing	Ford	Rick Ware Racing
24	Brett Butler	SR² Motorsports	Toyota	Taylor Brooks Salon
29	Kenny Wallace	RAB Racing	Toyota	U.S. Cellular
30	Nelson Piquet Jr. (R)	Turner Scott Motorsports	Chevrolet	Worx Yard Tools
31	Justin Allgaier	Turner Scott Motorsports	Chevrolet	Brandt Professional Agriculture
32	Kyle Larson (R)	Turner Scott Motorsports	Chevrolet	Eveready
33	Ryan Gifford	Richard Childress Racing	Chevrolet	Menards, Rheem
40	Reed Sorenson	The Motorsports Group	Chevrolet	Swisher E-Cigarette
42	T. J. Bell	The Motorsports Group	Chevrolet	The Motorsports Group
43	Michael Annett	Richard Petty Motorsports	Ford	Northland Oil
44	Cole Whitt	TriStar Motorsports	Toyota	TriStar Motorsports
46	Jason Bowles	The Motorsports Group	Chevrolet	The Motorsports Group
50	Danny Efland	MAKE Motorsports	Chevrolet	A-1 Bail Bonds
51	Jeremy Clements	Jeremy Clements Racing	Chevrolet	RepairableVehicles.com
52	Joey Gase	Jimmy Means Racing	Toyota	Iowa Donor Network
54	Drew Herring	Joe Gibbs Racing	Toyota	Monster Energy
60	Travis Pastrana	Roush Fenway Racing	Ford	X Games Los Angeles
70	Johanna Long	ML Motorsports	Chevrolet	Foretravel Motorcoach
74	Kevin Lepage	Mike Harmon Racing	Chevrolet	Country Roads Ride Grouping, I-Car Gold Class
77	Parker Kligerman	Kyle Busch Motorsports	Toyota	Toyota
79	Kyle Fowler	Go Green Racing	Ford	Sarges' Tailgate Grille
87	Travis Sauter	NEMCO Motorsports	Toyota	Lester Buildings
89	Morgan Shepherd	Shepherd Racing Ventures	Chevrolet	Racing with Jesus
99	Alex Bowman (R)	RAB Racing	Toyota	ToyotaCare
Official entry list

== Practice ==
=== First practice ===
The first practice session was held on Friday, August 2, at 3:30 PM CST, and would last for an hour and 20 minutes. Austin Dillon of Richard Childress Racing would set the fastest time in the session, with a lap of 23.374 and an average speed of 134.765 miles per hour (216.883 km/h).

Pos.	#	Driver	Team	Make	Time	Speed
1	3	Austin Dillon	Richard Childress Racing	Chevrolet	23.374	134.765
2	29	Kenny Wallace	RAB Racing	Toyota	23.539	133.820
3	32	Kyle Larson (R)	Turner Scott Motorsports	Chevrolet	23.562	133.690
Full first practice results

=== Second and final practice ===
The second and final practice session, sometimes referred to as Happy Hour, was held on Friday, August 2, at 6:00 PM CST, and would last for an hour and 20 minutes. Austin Dillon of Richard Childress Racing would set the fastest time in the session, with a lap of 23.181 and an average speed of 135.887 miles per hour (218.689 km/h).

Pos.	#	Driver	Team	Make	Time	Speed
1	3	Austin Dillon	Richard Childress Racing	Chevrolet	23.289	135.257
2	32	Kyle Larson (R)	Turner Scott Motorsports	Chevrolet	23.329	135.025
3	77	Parker Kligerman	Kyle Busch Motorsports	Toyota	23.338	134.973
Full Happy Hour practice results

== Qualifying ==
Qualifying was held on Saturday, August 3, at 4:05 PM CST. Each driver would have two laps to set a fastest time; the fastest of the two would count as their official qualifying lap.

Drew Herring of Joe Gibbs Racing would win the pole, setting a time of 23.270 and an average speed of 135.367 miles per hour (217.852 km/h).

No drivers would fail to qualify.

=== Full qualifying results ===
Pos.	#	Driver	Team	Make	Time	Speed
1	54	Drew Herring	Joe Gibbs Racing	Toyota	23.270	135.367
2	7	Regan Smith	JR Motorsports	Chevrolet	23.349	134.909
3	99	Alex Bowman (R)	RAB Racing	Toyota	23.364	134.823
4	2	Brian Scott	Richard Childress Racing	Chevrolet	23.391	134.667
5	22	Brad Keselowski (i)	Penske Racing	Ford	23.393	134.656
6	20	Brian Vickers	Joe Gibbs Racing	Toyota	23.418	134.512
7	6	Trevor Bayne	Roush Fenway Racing	Ford	23.445	134.357
8	3	Austin Dillon	Richard Childress Racing	Chevrolet	23.470	134.214
9	31	Justin Allgaier	Turner Scott Motorsports	Chevrolet	23.501	134.037
10	11	Elliott Sadler	Joe Gibbs Racing	Toyota	23.525	133.900
11	32	Kyle Larson (R)	Turner Scott Motorsports	Chevrolet	23.528	133.883
12	29	Kenny Wallace	RAB Racing	Toyota	23.535	133.843
13	30	Nelson Piquet Jr. (R)	Turner Scott Motorsports	Chevrolet	23.558	133.713
14	12	Sam Hornish Jr.	Penske Racing	Ford	23.579	133.593
15	60	Travis Pastrana	Roush Fenway Racing	Ford	23.585	133.559
16	44	Cole Whitt	TriStar Motorsports	Toyota	23.602	133.463
17	43	Michael Annett	Richard Petty Motorsports	Ford	23.667	133.097
18	40	Reed Sorenson	The Motorsports Group	Chevrolet	23.712	132.844
19	5	Brad Sweet	JR Motorsports	Chevrolet	23.727	132.760
20	77	Parker Kligerman	Kyle Busch Motorsports	Toyota	23.758	132.587
21	70	Johanna Long	ML Motorsports	Chevrolet	23.797	132.370
22	51	Jeremy Clements	Jeremy Clements Racing	Chevrolet	23.827	132.203
23	33	Ryan Gifford	Richard Childress Racing	Chevrolet	23.835	132.159
24	19	Mike Bliss	TriStar Motorsports	Toyota	23.867	131.981
25	24	Brett Butler	SR² Motorsports	Toyota	23.936	131.601
26	14	Eric McClure	TriStar Motorsports	Toyota	24.100	130.705
27	52	Joey Gase	Jimmy Means Racing	Chevrolet	24.216	130.079
28	01	Mike Wallace	JD Motorsports	Chevrolet	24.252	129.886
29	10	Jeff Green	TriStar Motorsports	Toyota	24.308	129.587
30	79	Kyle Fowler	Go Green Racing	Ford	24.313	129.560
31	00	Blake Koch	SR² Motorsports	Toyota	24.494	128.603
32	4	Daryl Harr	JD Motorsports	Chevrolet	24.527	128.430
33	46	Jason Bowles	The Motorsports Group	Chevrolet	24.622	127.934
34	74	Kevin Lepage	Mike Harmon Racing	Chevrolet	24.694	127.561
35	42	T. J. Bell	The Motorsports Group	Chevrolet	24.798	127.026
36	87	Travis Sauter	NEMCO Motorsports	Toyota	24.833	126.847
37	89	Morgan Shepherd	Shepherd Racing Ventures	Chevrolet	24.929	126.359
38	50	Danny Efland	MAKE Motorsports	Chevrolet	24.943	126.288
39	23	Richard Harriman	Rick Ware Racing	Ford	25.206	124.970
40	15	Carl Long	Rick Ware Racing	Ford	25.422	123.908
Official starting lineup

== Race results ==
Fin	St	#	Driver	Team	Make	Laps	Led	Status	Pts	Winnings
1	5	22	Brad Keselowski (i)	Penske Racing	Ford	250	35	running	0	$73,740
2	14	12	Sam Hornish Jr.	Penske Racing	Ford	250	0	running	42	$61,000
3	6	20	Brian Vickers	Joe Gibbs Racing	Toyota	250	8	running	42	$52,000
4	8	3	Austin Dillon	Richard Childress Racing	Chevrolet	250	116	running	42	$44,850
5	11	32	Kyle Larson (R)	Turner Scott Motorsports	Chevrolet	250	0	running	39	$35,725
6	1	54	Drew Herring	Joe Gibbs Racing	Toyota	250	26	running	39	$32,775
7	3	99	Alex Bowman (R)	RAB Racing	Toyota	250	0	running	37	$27,835
8	10	11	Elliott Sadler	Joe Gibbs Racing	Toyota	250	0	running	36	$27,795
9	23	33	Ryan Gifford	Richard Childress Racing	Chevrolet	250	0	running	35	$25,675
10	7	6	Trevor Bayne	Roush Fenway Racing	Ford	250	6	running	35	$25,975
11	2	7	Regan Smith	JR Motorsports	Chevrolet	250	59	running	34	$24,200
12	17	43	Michael Annett	Richard Petty Motorsports	Ford	250	0	running	32	$23,650
13	4	2	Brian Scott	Richard Childress Racing	Chevrolet	250	0	running	31	$25,125
14	13	30	Nelson Piquet Jr. (R)	Turner Scott Motorsports	Chevrolet	250	0	running	30	$22,600
15	19	5	Brad Sweet	JR Motorsports	Chevrolet	250	0	running	29	$23,050
16	20	77	Parker Kligerman	Kyle Busch Motorsports	Toyota	250	0	running	28	$22,125
17	9	31	Justin Allgaier	Turner Scott Motorsports	Chevrolet	250	0	running	27	$21,700
18	24	19	Mike Bliss	TriStar Motorsports	Toyota	248	0	running	26	$21,450
19	21	70	Johanna Long	ML Motorsports	Chevrolet	247	0	running	25	$21,225
20	16	44	Cole Whitt	TriStar Motorsports	Toyota	247	0	running	24	$21,675
21	22	51	Jeremy Clements	Jeremy Clements Racing	Chevrolet	247	0	running	23	$20,875
22	12	29	Kenny Wallace	RAB Racing	Toyota	246	0	running	22	$14,750
23	26	14	Eric McClure	TriStar Motorsports	Toyota	246	0	running	21	$20,600
24	28	01	Mike Wallace	JD Motorsports	Chevrolet	246	0	running	20	$20,475
25	32	4	Daryl Harr	JD Motorsports	Chevrolet	246	0	running	19	$20,825
26	27	52	Joey Gase	Jimmy Means Racing	Chevrolet	244	0	running	18	$14,225
27	15	60	Travis Pastrana	Roush Fenway Racing	Ford	243	0	running	17	$20,100
28	30	79	Kyle Fowler	Go Green Racing	Ford	242	0	running	16	$19,950
29	39	23	Richard Harriman	Rick Ware Racing	Ford	240	0	running	15	$19,825
30	36	87	Travis Sauter	NEMCO Motorsports	Toyota	238	0	running	14	$20,000
31	18	40	Reed Sorenson	The Motorsports Group	Chevrolet	228	0	running	13	$19,550
32	34	74	Kevin Lepage	Mike Harmon Racing	Chevrolet	135	0	vibration	12	$19,455
33	25	24	Brett Butler	SR² Motorsports	Toyota	74	0	brakes	11	$19,335
34	38	50	Danny Efland	MAKE Motorsports	Chevrolet	26	0	brakes	10	$13,215
35	37	89	Morgan Shepherd	Shepherd Racing Ventures	Chevrolet	23	0	brakes	9	$13,097
36	40	15	Carl Long	Rick Ware Racing	Ford	13	0	handling	8	$12,125
37	35	42	T. J. Bell	The Motorsports Group	Chevrolet	6	0	vibration	7	$12,015
38	31	00	Blake Koch	SR² Motorsports	Toyota	5	0	brakes	6	$11,936
39	33	46	Jason Bowles	The Motorsports Group	Chevrolet	4	0	vibration	5	$11,745
40	29	10	Jeff Green	TriStar Motorsports	Toyota	3	0	vibration	4	$11,630
Official race results

== Standings after the race ==
Drivers' Championship standings

Pos	Driver	Points
1	Austin Dillon	698
2	Regan Smith	684 (-14)
3	Sam Hornish Jr.	684 (-14)
4	Elliott Sadler	679 (–19)
5	Brian Vickers	670 (–28)
6	Kyle Larson	651 (–47)
7	Justin Allgaier	648 (–50)
8	Brian Scott	641 (–57)
9	Trevor Bayne	627 (–71)
10	Parker Kligerman	617 (–81)
11	Alex Bowman	553 (–145)
12	Nelson Piquet Jr.	537 (–161)
Official driver's standings

- Note: Only the first 12 positions are included for the driver standings.

Previous race: 2013 Indiana 250	NASCAR Nationwide Series; 2013 season	Next race: 2013 Zippo 200 at The Glen
