= 2011 ARCA Racing Series =

59th season of the ARCA Racing Series

Seasons
- ← 2010 2012 →

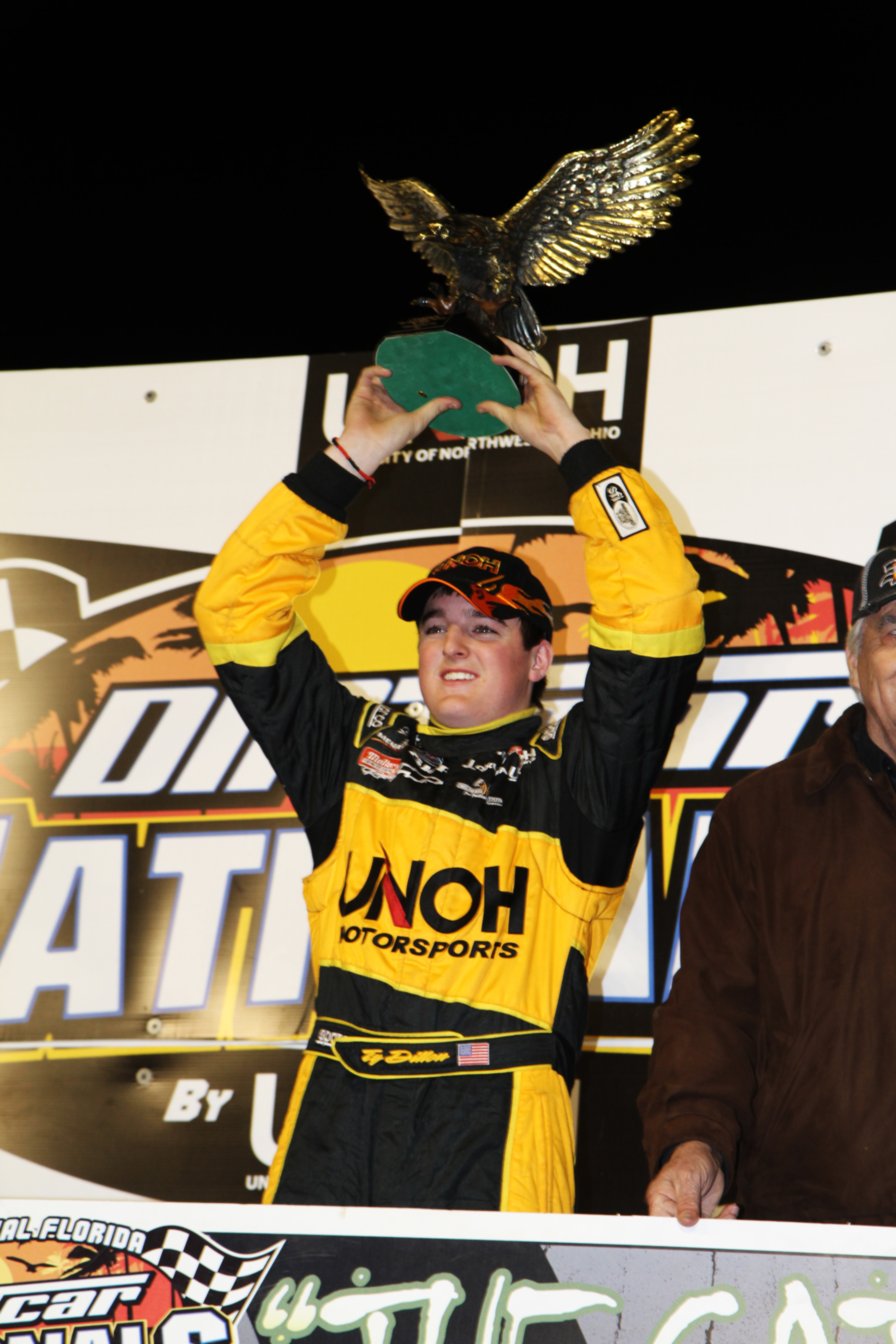
Ty Dillon, the 2011 ARCA champion.

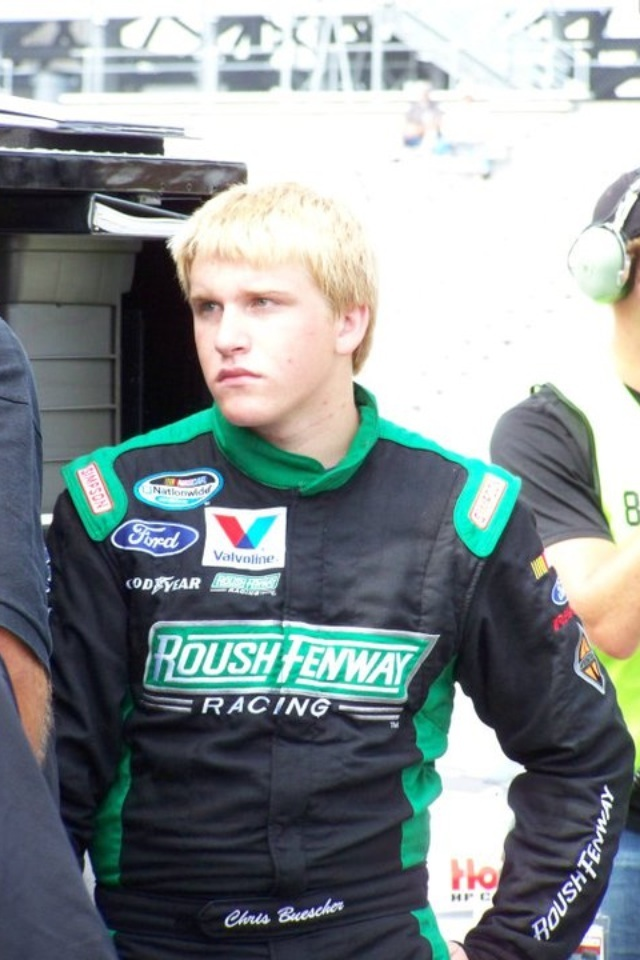
Chris Buescher finished second behind Dillon in the championship by 340 points.

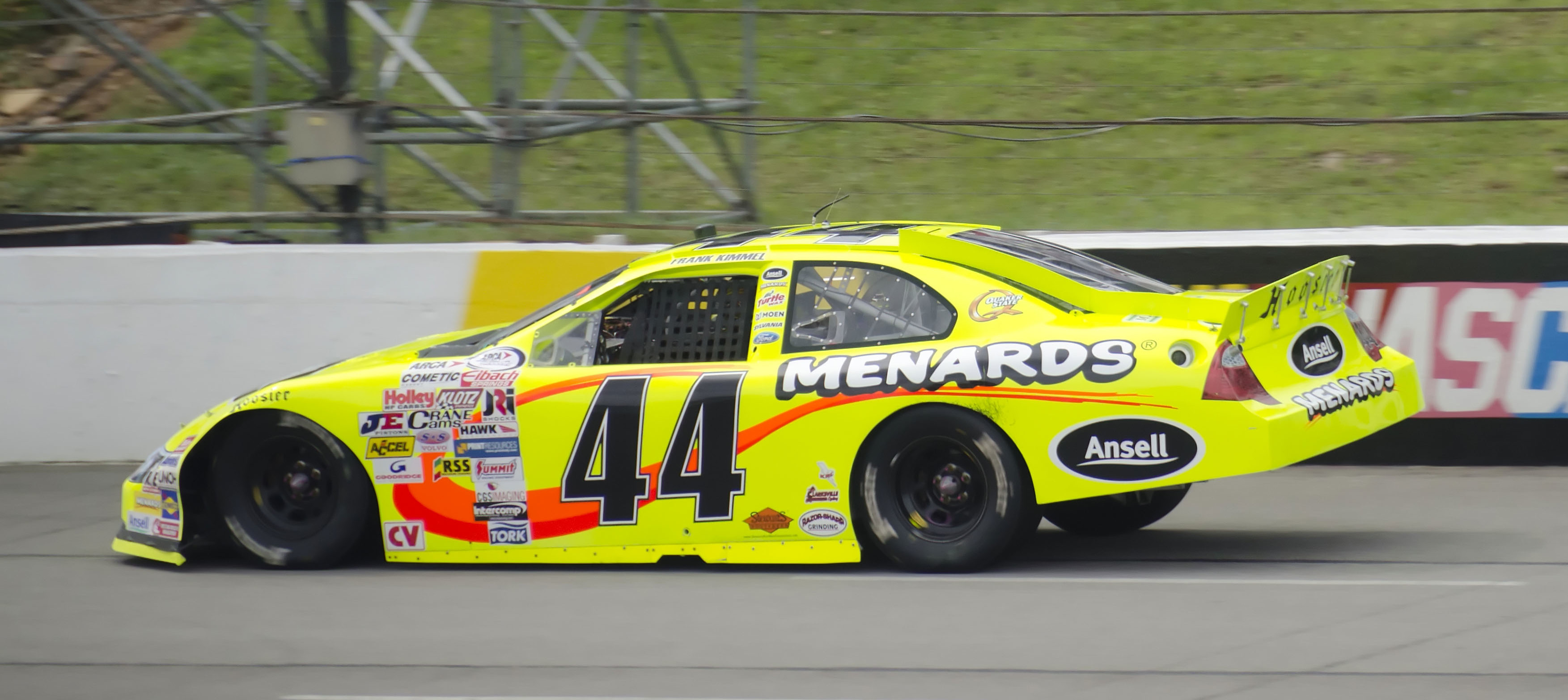
Frank Kimmel, driving the No. 44 car for his family team, finished third in the championship.

The 2011 ARCA Racing Series presented by Menards is the 59th season of the ARCA Racing Series. The season included nineteen races, down from twenty, and began with the Lucas Oil Slick Mist 200 at Daytona International Speedway and ending with the Federated Car Care 200 at Toledo Speedway. Ty Dillon of Richard Childress Racing won the season championship.

== Teams and drivers ==
=== Complete schedule ===
Manufacturer	Team	No.	Driver
Chevrolet	CGH Motorsports	58	Chad Hackenbracht
Chevrolet	Darrell Basham Racing	34	Darrell Basham
Chevrolet	Richard Childress Racing	31	Tim George Jr.
Chevrolet	Richard Childress Racing	41	Ty Dillon
Ford	Andy Belmont Racing	1	Chad McCumbee
Ford	Empire Racing	82	Sean Corr
Ford	Hylton Motorsports	48	James Hylton
Ford	Kimmel Racing	44	Frank Kimmel
Ford	Roulo Brothers Racing	17	Chris Buescher
Chevrolet 12 Ford 7	Hixson Motorsports	23	Nick Igdalsky 5
Chevrolet 12 Ford 7	Hixson Motorsports	23	Levi Youster 12
Chevrolet 12 Ford 7	Hixson Motorsports	23	Rob Jones 2
Chevrolet 6 Ford 13	Wayne Peterson Racing	06	Barry Fitzgerald 1
Chevrolet 6 Ford 13	Wayne Peterson Racing	06	Wayne Peterson 4
Chevrolet 6 Ford 13	Wayne Peterson Racing	06	Tommy O'Leary IV 10
Chevrolet 6 Ford 13	Wayne Peterson Racing	06	Steve Fox 1
Chevrolet 6 Ford 13	Wayne Peterson Racing	06	Mike Harmon 1
Chevrolet 6 Ford 13	Wayne Peterson Racing	06	Don Thompson 1
Chevrolet 6 Ford 13	Wayne Peterson Racing	06	Scott Null 1
Chevrolet 11 Ford 6 Dodge 2	Fast Track Racing	10	Ed Pompa 6
Chevrolet 11 Ford 6 Dodge 2	Fast Track Racing	10	Charlie Vest 2
Chevrolet 11 Ford 6 Dodge 2	Fast Track Racing	10	Marc Easton 3
Chevrolet 11 Ford 6 Dodge 2	Fast Track Racing	10	Robin Bonnano 1
Chevrolet 11 Ford 6 Dodge 2	Fast Track Racing	10	Richard Harriman 4
Chevrolet 11 Ford 6 Dodge 2	Fast Track Racing	10	Rick Clifton 2
Chevrolet 11 Ford 6 Dodge 2	Fast Track Racing	10	A. J. Fike 2 (Note: Entries were fielded in a collaboration with RFMS Racing.)
Chevrolet 11 Ford 6 Dodge 2	Fast Track Racing	10	Tim Mitchell 2
Chevrolet 11 Ford 6 Dodge 2	Fast Track Racing	10	Roby Bujdoso 1 (Note: Entry was fielded in a collaboration with Andy Belmont Racing.)
Ford 11 Chevrolet 7 Dodge 1	Fast Track Racing	11	Bryan Silas 4
Ford 11 Chevrolet 7 Dodge 1	Fast Track Racing	11	Richard Harriman 5
Ford 11 Chevrolet 7 Dodge 1	Fast Track Racing	11	Todd Bowsher 1
Ford 11 Chevrolet 7 Dodge 1	Fast Track Racing	11	Marc Easton 1
Ford 11 Chevrolet 7 Dodge 1	Fast Track Racing	11	Chase Mattioli 1
Ford 11 Chevrolet 7 Dodge 1	Fast Track Racing	11	Rick Clifton 1
Ford 11 Chevrolet 7 Dodge 1	Fast Track Racing	11	Ed Pompa 1
Ford 11 Chevrolet 7 Dodge 1	Fast Track Racing	11	Ryan Glenski 1
Ford 11 Chevrolet 7 Dodge 1	Fast Track Racing	11	Tyler Speer 2
Ford 11 Chevrolet 7 Dodge 1	Fast Track Racing	11	Brad Lloyd 1
Ford 11 Chevrolet 7 Dodge 1	Fast Track Racing	11	Frank Wilson Jr. 1
Chevrolet 7 Toyota 7 Ford 2	Venturini Motorsports	15	Kyle Fowler 3
Chevrolet 7 Toyota 7 Ford 2	Venturini Motorsports	15	Kyle Hadley 1
Chevrolet 7 Toyota 7 Ford 2	Venturini Motorsports	15	Rob Jones 1
Chevrolet 7 Toyota 7 Ford 2	Venturini Motorsports	15	Guy Lamon 1 (Note: Entry was fielded in a collaboration with Andy Belmont Racing.)
Chevrolet 7 Toyota 7 Ford 2	Venturini Motorsports	15	Tom Berte 2
Chevrolet 7 Toyota 7 Ford 2	Venturini Motorsports	15	Josh Richards 1
Chevrolet 7 Toyota 7 Ford 2	Venturini Motorsports	15	Chris Bailey Jr. 1
Chevrolet 7 Toyota 7 Ford 2	Venturini Motorsports	15	Kyle Belmont 1
Chevrolet 7 Toyota 7 Ford 2	Venturini Motorsports	15	Ryan Blaney 1
Chevrolet 7 Toyota 7 Ford 2	Venturini Motorsports	15	Ryan Unzicker 1 (Note: Entry was fielded in a collaboration with Hendren Motorsports.)
Chevrolet 7 Toyota 7 Ford 2	Venturini Motorsports	15	John Blankenship 2
Chevrolet 7 Toyota 7 Ford 2	Venturini Motorsports	15	A. J. Henriksen 1 (Note: Entry was fielded in a collaboration with ECC Motorsports.)
Chevrolet 7 Toyota 7 Ford 2	Venturini Motorsports	15	Joe Cooksey 1 (Note: Entry was fielded in a collaboration with Joe Cooksey Racing.)
Chevrolet 7 Toyota 7 Ford 2	Venturini Motorsports	15	Darren Hagen 1
Chevrolet 7 Toyota 7 Ford 2	Venturini Motorsports	15	Clint King 1
Toyota 10 Chevrolet 9	Venturini Motorsports	25	Steve Arpin 1
Toyota 10 Chevrolet 9	Venturini Motorsports	25	Scott Lagasse Jr. 1
Toyota 10 Chevrolet 9	Venturini Motorsports	25	Max Gresham 6
Toyota 10 Chevrolet 9	Venturini Motorsports	25	Kenzie Ruston 1
Toyota 10 Chevrolet 9	Venturini Motorsports	25	George Miedecke 1
Toyota 10 Chevrolet 9	Venturini Motorsports	25	Josh Richards 2
Toyota 10 Chevrolet 9	Venturini Motorsports	25	Brennan Poole 3
Toyota 10 Chevrolet 9	Venturini Motorsports	25	Ryan Blaney 1
Toyota 10 Chevrolet 9	Venturini Motorsports	25	Clint King 2
Toyota 10 Chevrolet 9	Venturini Motorsports	25	Darren Hagen 1
Toyota 13 Chevrolet 6	Venturini Motorsports	55	Hal Martin 5
Toyota 13 Chevrolet 6	Venturini Motorsports	55	Brennan Poole 1
Toyota 13 Chevrolet 6	Venturini Motorsports	55	John Stancill 1
Toyota 13 Chevrolet 6	Venturini Motorsports	55	Ali Jackson 1
Toyota 13 Chevrolet 6	Venturini Motorsports	55	John Blankenship 1
Toyota 13 Chevrolet 6	Venturini Motorsports	55	Kenzie Ruston 3
Toyota 13 Chevrolet 6	Venturini Motorsports	55	Kyle Fowler 2
Toyota 13 Chevrolet 6	Venturini Motorsports	55	Will Vaught 2
Toyota 13 Chevrolet 6	Venturini Motorsports	55	Alex Bowman 2
Toyota 13 Chevrolet 6	Venturini Motorsports	55	Max Gresham 1
Dodge 2 Ford 17	Martins Motorsports 1 Brad Smith Motorsports 18	26	Tommy Joe Martins 1 (Note: It was a Martins Motorsports entry using Brad Smith Motorsports' owner points.)
Dodge 2 Ford 17	Martins Motorsports 1 Brad Smith Motorsports 18	26	Brad Smith 17
Dodge 2 Ford 17	Martins Motorsports 1 Brad Smith Motorsports 18	26	Con Nicolopoulos 1
Ford 6 Chevrolet 2 Dodge 9 Toyota 2	Andy Belmont Racing 4 Josh Williams Racing 3 Fast Track Racing 11; Hattori Racing Enterprises 2 (Note: All four of these teams shared owner points for one full-time car.)	14	John Ferrier 1
Ford 6 Chevrolet 2 Dodge 9 Toyota 2	Andy Belmont Racing 4 Josh Williams Racing 3 Fast Track Racing 11; Hattori Racing Enterprises 2	14	Barry Fitzgerald 2
Ford 6 Chevrolet 2 Dodge 9 Toyota 2	Andy Belmont Racing 4 Josh Williams Racing 3 Fast Track Racing 11; Hattori Racing Enterprises 2	14	Josh Williams 3
Ford 6 Chevrolet 2 Dodge 9 Toyota 2	Andy Belmont Racing 4 Josh Williams Racing 3 Fast Track Racing 11; Hattori Racing Enterprises 2	14	Richard Harriman 3
Ford 6 Chevrolet 2 Dodge 9 Toyota 2	Andy Belmont Racing 4 Josh Williams Racing 3 Fast Track Racing 11; Hattori Racing Enterprises 2	14	Marc Easton 1
Ford 6 Chevrolet 2 Dodge 9 Toyota 2	Andy Belmont Racing 4 Josh Williams Racing 3 Fast Track Racing 11; Hattori Racing Enterprises 2	14	Terry Evans 1
Ford 6 Chevrolet 2 Dodge 9 Toyota 2	Andy Belmont Racing 4 Josh Williams Racing 3 Fast Track Racing 11; Hattori Racing Enterprises 2	14	Brad Lloyd 4
Ford 6 Chevrolet 2 Dodge 9 Toyota 2	Andy Belmont Racing 4 Josh Williams Racing 3 Fast Track Racing 11; Hattori Racing Enterprises 2	14	Charlie Vest 1
Ford 6 Chevrolet 2 Dodge 9 Toyota 2	Andy Belmont Racing 4 Josh Williams Racing 3 Fast Track Racing 11; Hattori Racing Enterprises 2	14	Chris Coker 1
Ford 6 Chevrolet 2 Dodge 9 Toyota 2	Andy Belmont Racing 4 Josh Williams Racing 3 Fast Track Racing 11; Hattori Racing Enterprises 2	14	Matt DiBenedetto 2
Toyota 2 Chevrolet 17	Ken Schrader Racing	52	Tom Hessert III
Toyota 1 Chevrolet 17 Ford 1	Venturini Motorsports 1 Hixson Motorsports 17; Bull Racing 1	28	Miguel Paludo 1 (Note: It was a Venturini Motorsports entry using Hixson Motorsports' owner points.)
Toyota 1 Chevrolet 17 Ford 1	Venturini Motorsports 1 Hixson Motorsports 17; Bull Racing 1	28	Rob Jones 3
Toyota 1 Chevrolet 17 Ford 1	Venturini Motorsports 1 Hixson Motorsports 17; Bull Racing 1	28	Ron Cox 12
Toyota 1 Chevrolet 17 Ford 1	Venturini Motorsports 1 Hixson Motorsports 17; Bull Racing 1	28	Ed Bull 1 (Note: It was a Bull Racing entry using Hixson Motorsports' owner points.)
Toyota 1 Chevrolet 17 Ford 1	Venturini Motorsports 1 Hixson Motorsports 17; Bull Racing 1	28	Jake Crum 1
Toyota 1 Chevrolet 17 Ford 1	Venturini Motorsports 1 Hixson Motorsports 17; Bull Racing 1	28	Justin Jennings
Toyota 10 Dodge 9	Win-Tron Racing	32	Matt Merrell 1
Toyota 10 Dodge 9	Win-Tron Racing	32	Ryan Wilson 4
Toyota 10 Dodge 9	Win-Tron Racing	32	Chris Windom 2
Toyota 10 Dodge 9	Win-Tron Racing	32	Joey Miller 1
Toyota 10 Dodge 9	Win-Tron Racing	32	Mason Mingus 1

== Schedule ==
The 2011 series schedule was announced in December 2010.

No.	Race title	Track	Date
1	Lucas Oil Slick Mist 200	Daytona International Speedway, Daytona Beach	February 12
2	3 Amigos 250	Talladega Superspeedway, Talladega	April 15
3	Kentuckiana Ford Dealers 200	Salem Speedway, Salem	May 1
4	Menards 200 presented by Federated Car Care	Toledo Speedway, Toledo	May 15
5	ModSpace 150	New Jersey Motorsports Park, Millville	May 22
6	The Messina Wildlife Animal Stopper 150	Chicagoland Speedway, Joliet	June 4
7	Pocono ARCA 200	Pocono Raceway, Pocono	June 11
8	The RainEater Wiper Blades 200	Michigan International Speedway, Brooklyn	June 17
9	Winchester ARCA 200 presented by Federated Auto Parts	Winchester Speedway, Winchester	June 25
10	Hantz Group 200	Berlin Raceway, Marne	July 9
11	Prairie Meadows 200	Iowa Speedway, Newton	July 16
12	Ansell Protective Gloves 200	Lucas Oil Raceway, Brownsburg	July 28
13	Pennsylvania ARCA 125	Pocono Raceway, Pocono	August 6
14	Allen Crowe Memorial 100	Illinois State Fairgrounds Racetrack, Springfield	August 21
15	Herr's Live Life with Flavor! 200	Madison International Speedway, Rutland	August 26
16	Southern Illinois 100	DuQuoin State Fairgrounds Racetrack, Du Quoin	September 5
17	Kentuckiana Ford Dealers ARCA Fall Classic by Federated Car Care	Salem Speedway, Salem	September 17
18	Kansas Lottery 98.9	Kansas Speedway, Kansas City	October 7
19	Federated Car Care 200	Toledo Speedway, Toledo	October 16

=== Calendar changes ===
- Palm Beach International Raceway, Texas Motor Speedway, Mansfield Motorsports Park, and Rockingham Speedway were removed from the schedule.
- Winchester Speedway, Lucas Oil Raceway, and Madison International Speedway were added to the schedule.
- Salem Speedway's race date was moved from April to May.
- New Jersey Motorsports Park's race date moved from August to May.
- Chicagoland Speedway's race date was moved from August to June to coincide with the STP 300 Nationwide Series race.
- Winchester Speedway was added to the schedule.
- Berlin Raceway's race date moved from August to July.
- The Federated Car Care 200, held at Toledo Speedway, was moved from September to October, causing it to become the season ending race.

== Results and standings ==
=== Races ===
No.	Race	Pole position	Most laps led	Winning driver	Manufacturer	No.	Winning team
1	Lucas Oil Slick Mist 200	Ty Dillon	Bobby Gerhart	Bobby Gerhart	Chevrolet	5	Bobby Gerhart Racing
2	3 Amigos 250	Ty Dillon	Ty Dillon	Ty Dillon	Chevrolet	41	Richard Childress Racing
3	Kentuckiana Ford Dealers 200	Ty Dillon	Ty Dillon	Brennan Poole	Chevrolet	55	Venturini Motorsports
4	Menards 200 presented by Federated Car Care	Milka Duno	Frank Kimmel	Ty Dillon	Chevrolet	41	Richard Childress Racing
5	ModSpace 150	Andrew Ranger	George Miedecke	Andrew Ranger	Dodge	53	NDS Motorsports
6	The Messina Wildlife Animal Stopper 150	Josh Richards	Chad Hackenbracht	Ty Dillon	Chevrolet	41	Richard Childress Racing
7	Pocono ARCA 200	Brennan Poole	Chris Buescher	Tim George Jr.	Chevrolet	31	Richard Childress Racing
8	The RainEater Wiper Blades 200	Cale Gale	Cale Gale	Ty Dillon	Chevrolet	41	Richard Childress Racing
9	Winchester ARCA 200 presented by Federated Auto Parts	Ryan Blaney	Ryan Blaney	Dakoda Armstrong	Dodge	22	Cunningham Motorsports
10	Hantz Group 200	Grant Enfinger	Grant Enfinger	Matt Merrell	Dodge	32	Win-Tron Racing
11	Prairie Meadows 200	Ty Dillon	Ty Dillon	Ty Dillon	Chevrolet	41	Richard Childress Racing
12	Ansell Protective Gloves 200	Ty Dillon	Ty Dillon	Ty Dillon	Chevrolet	41	Richard Childress Racing
13	Pennsylvania ARCA 125	Max Gresham	Ty Dillon	Ty Dillon	Chevrolet	41	Richard Childress Racing
14	Allen Crowe Memorial 100	Ty Dillon	Chad McCumbee	Chad McCumbee	Ford	1	Andy Belmont Racing
15	Herr's Live Life with Flavor! 200	Clint King	Chris Buescher	Alex Bowman	Toyota	55	Venturini Motorsports
16	Southern Illinois 100	Ty Dillon	Chris Buescher	Chris Buescher	Ford	17	Roulo Brothers Racing
17	Kentuckiana Ford Dealers ARCA Fall Classic by Federated Car Care	Clint King	Chris Buescher	Chris Buescher	Ford	17	Roulo Brothers Racing
18	Kansas Lottery 98.9	Max Gresham	Ty Dillon	Alex Bowman	Toyota	55	Venturini Motorsports
19	Federated Car Care 200	Tom Hessert III	Tom Hessert III	Chris Buescher	Ford	17	Roulo Brothers Racing

=== Standings ===
No.	Driver	Points	Wins	Top 5	Top 10
1	Ty Dillon	5220	7	13	16
2	Chris Buescher	4880	3	14	16
3	Frank Kimmel	4630	0	3	17
4	Grant Enfinger	4590	0	7	14
5	Chad McCumbee	4465	1	4	15
6	Tom Hessert III	4335	0	7	13
7	Tim George Jr.	4325	1	8	10
8	Chad Hackenbracht	4145	0	3	10
9	Sean Corr	3985	0	0	2
10	Darrell Basham	3310	0	0	0
11	James Hylton	3090	0	0	0
12	Brad Smith	2410	0	0	0
13	Matt Merrell	2350	1	4	6
14	Levi Youster	2305	0	0	0
15	Will Kimmel	2235	0	2	3
16	Maryeve Dufault	2105	0	0	1
17	Ron Cox	2025	0	0	0
18	Milka Duno	1780	0	0	0
19	Richard Harriman	1595	0	0	0
20	Bobby Gerhart	1515	1	2	2

=== Full Drivers' Championship ===
(key) Bold – Pole position awarded by time. Italics – Pole position set by final practice results or rainout. * – Most laps led.

Pos	Driver	DAY	TAL	SLM	TOL	NJE	CHI	POC	MCH	WIN	BER	IOW	IRP	POC	ISF	MAD	DQN	SLM	KAN	TOL	Points
1	Ty Dillon	**11**	**1***	**2***	1	8	1	4	1	4	11	**1***	**1***	1*	**13**	4	**2**	8	7*	2	5220
2	Chris Buescher	2	5	22	5	15	2	2	5	2	7	3	22	3	8	2*	1*	1*	2	1	4880
3	Frank Kimmel	10	2	3	9*	6	7	8	9	8	8	6	12	10	7	6	6	5	9	21	4630
4	Grant Enfinger	9	13	10	2	10	8	3	14	9	**3***	4	9	5	12	14	10	22	3	5	4590
5	Chad McCumbee	8	20	9	7	3	4	6	8	7	15	28	7	26	1*	10	7	9	8	3	4465
6	Tom Hessert III	37	6	7	14	5	6	9	29	5	6	8	5	4	2	5	26	19	13	**4***	4335
7	Tim George Jr.	27	18	11	4	4	32	1	3	11	2	5	28	2	16	9	9	3	16	17	4325
8	Chad Hackenbracht	40	17	19	11	9	20*	7	4	3	5	10	16	7	10	23	14	17	10	8	4145
9	Sean Corr	15	16	14	20	16	13	11	24	13	12	9	27	11	11	7	11	11	14	22	3985
10	Darrell Basham	25	31	12	21	26	17	27	33	19	20	21	15	29	14	20	23	14	25	20	3310
11	James Hylton	18	33	23	27	30	19	21	27	17	22	22	25	27	26	19	29	18	23	30	3090
12	Brad Smith		32	25	28	33	26	22	23	24	23	33	DNQ	23	19	28	32	25	27	32	2410
13	Matt Merrell	3	10	5	3	14	24	10	15	25	1	29									2350
14	Levi Youster			18	22	35	15		20	14	17	18	23	34	17	24	22	30	DNQ	25	2305
15	Will Kimmel		38	29		31	31	32	37	27	27	37		12	4	30	8	2	17	29	2235
16	Maryeve Dufault	28	12	13	23	21	10	12	28	20		25	24	13					18	26	2105
17	Ron Cox			26	16				34	16	18	35	20	40	22	13	17	24	24	34	2025
18	Milka Duno	31	19	17	15	22						23	19	25		18		20	19	18	1780
19	Richard Harriman		23				27	33	35	21	24	39	34	DNQ	31	31	33	26	32	DNQ	1595
20	Bobby Gerhart	1*	3				22	13	12			31	18	18					22	19	1515
21	Max Gresham			15					2		13		11	**6**				10	**4**		1360
22	Tommy O'Leary IV				24		33		32	26	25		DNQ		27		27	27	33	23	1190
23	Rob Jones		24		30		14		17	28	26	34	DNQ		29		31	15	29		1170
24	Jared Marks				13					12		11	30			12		4		10	1150
25	Dakoda Armstrong	20	14	8	8					1			4								1120
26	Bryan Silas	29	30	4		11		17	6			16									1050
27	Josh Williams			6	12	7						32	8							14	990
28	Brennan Poole			1				**5**				14								16	780
29	Benny Chastain	35	27				16	24	25				33	41					28	31	775
30	Ryan Wilson												21	9					11	6	690
31	Tom Berte						21	15	13			27		35					31		670
32	Brett Hudson	43	4	20									10					23			665
33	Andrew Ranger					**1**	5										5				655
34	Will Vaught	DNQ	9												5		3				640
35	Kenzie Ruston				10						10	12	26								635
36	Josh Richards						**3**		10						9						615
37	Nick Igdalsky	34	21			17		19						19							600
38	Marc Easton			24	26		25	28	36		30								34		595
39	Cale Gale								**19***			2							5		595
40	Joey Coulter	21	11						7				29								585
41	Wayne Peterson		29	21		32			39	29	32	36		DNQ					38		585
42	Clint King															**3**		**21**		7	575
43	Con Nicolopoulos				31		30		40	30	28			32	30	33					570
44	Kyle Fowler	16	36				23							24						27	555
45	Matt Lofton	DNQ					18		31			24							6		550
46	Brent Brevak	38	26				9							39		25				33	530
47	Charles Evans Jr.										16					17			DNQ	9	505
48	Hal Martin	30	28				12	30	30												505
49	John Blankenship									10				20					12		480
50	Ryan Blaney									**6***			2								460
51	Buster Graham							20				15		37					20		460
52	Kory Rabenold							16						15				16			455
53	Casey Roderick								21			13	31	30							450
54	Charlie Vest		34							22					25		30	29			450
55	Alex Bowman															1			1		445
56	Joe Mueller									23					21		21	32			435
57	Tim Cowen				17	12							DNQ							28	430
58	Kelly Kovski														6		4				425
59	Frankie Kimmel			27		29												7			380
60	Chris Windom														3		13				380
61	Clay Rogers								26			7	QL						30		375
62	Matt DiBenedetto																	6		12	370
63	Robb Brent								11					8							365
64	Spencer Gallagher												17			15			35		355
65	Brandon Kidd											17	14	38							345
66	Scott Lagasse Jr.		8																15		345
67	Brent Cross	26						23						21							340
68	Roger Carter								38			30		DNQ		16			Wth	DNQ	320
69	Michael Leavine							20						28					26		320
70	Brad Lloyd										29	38	DNQ			22			36		320
71	Rodney Melvin												DNQ		18		16				315
72	Mike Young				19					15											290
73	Rick Clifton								22			26		33							285
74	Mark Littleton														15		20				285
75	Tyler Speer														24		15				265
76	Tim Walter												DNQ			21		28		DNQ	265
77	George Cushman							31						14					DNQ		260
78	Brian Kaltreider							25						17							250
79	Joey Licata	6	37																		245
80	Dale Shearer								Wth				DNQ		23		25	Wth			245
81	Barry Fitzgerald	41	22				29														235
82	Steve Fox							29						16							235
83	Darren Hagen																12	33			235
84	George Miedecke					2*															235
85	James Buescher												3								225
86	Brian Rose	42	7																		225
87	Matt Crafton				18								32								215
88	Ricky Carmichael	4																			210
89	Kyle Martel							14						36							210
90	Patrick Sheltra										4										210
91	Jason Bowles	5																			205
92	Ryan Glenski												6								200
93	A. J. Henriksen												DNQ			11					200
94	John Stancill				6																200
95	Benny Gordon	7																			195
96	Joey Miller															8					190
97	Michael Simko										9									QL	185
98	A. J. Fike														28		28				180
99	Stefan Rzesnowiecky						11														175
100	Chrissy Wallace																			11	175
101	Brian Campbell										14										170
102	Josh Clemons																	12			170
103	Ed Pompa	36												22							170
104	Kevin Swindell	12																			170
105	Mark Thompson	17					34														170
106	J. R. Heffner												13								165
107	Jason Holehouse					13															165
108	Ryan Lynch																	13			165
109	Miguel Paludo	13																			165
110	Eddie Pearson												DNQ				18				165
111	Ryan Heavner																			13	165
112	Tommy Joe Martins	14																			160
113	Pierre Bourque		15																		155
114	Tim Mitchell		39															31	37		155
115	Stephen Sawyer			16																	150
116	Kent Schenkel								16												150
117	Terry Evans									18											140
118	Chase Mattioli							18													140
119	Steve Minghenelli					18															140
120	Tony Palumbo								18												140
121	Drew Charlson	DNQ																		24	135
122	Joe Cooksey																19				135
123	Jordan Dahlke										19										135
124	Ali Jackson					19															135
125	Justin Jennings											19									135
126	Ed Kennedy	19																			135
127	Todd Bowsher			30	25																130
128	Ed Bull					20															130
129	Ryan Unzicker														20						130
130	Jeb Burton										21										125
131	Chad Frewaldt																		21		125
132	Chris Lawson	22	Wth																		120
133	Willie Mullins					23															115
134	Scott Stenzel	23																			115
135	Robin Bonnano					24															110
136	John Ferrier	24																			110
137	Mike Koch																24				110
138	Austin Rettig												DNQ				34			DNQ	110
139	Brandon McReynolds		25																		105
140	Bob Schacht					25															105
141	Jake Crum							26													100
142	Scott Null															26					100
143	Jeff Buice					27															95
144	Will Gallaher															27					95
145	Mike Senica															32				DNQ	95
146	Chris Davis			28																	90
147	Terry Jones	39	35																		90
148	Guy Lamon					28															90
149	Dave Savicki						28														90
150	Scott Bross				29																85
151	Chris Coker															29					85
152	Steve Arpin	32																			75
153	Chris Bailey Jr.									31											75
154	Kyle Belmont										31										75
155	Don Thompson													31							75
156	Steve Blackburn	33																			65
157	Mason Mingus																	34			60
158	Joe Volpe					34															60
159	Mike Harmon												35								55
160	Frank Wilson Jr.																			35	55
161	Roby Bujdoso																			15	
162	Kyle Hadley			31																	
163	Ricky Byers	DNQ																			
164	Nick Tucker																			DNQ	
165	Zach Ralston																			DNQ	
166	Jack Sprague																			Wth	
Pos	Driver	DAY	TAL	SLM	TOL	NJE	CHI	POC	MCH	WIN	BER	IOW	IRP	POC	ISF	MAD	DQN	SLM	KAN	TOL	Points

== See also ==
- 2011 NASCAR Sprint Cup Series
- 2011 NASCAR Nationwide Series
- 2011 NASCAR Camping World Truck Series
- 2011 NASCAR Whelen Modified Tour
- 2011 NASCAR Whelen Southern Modified Tour
- 2011 NASCAR Canadian Tire Series
- 2011 NASCAR Corona Series
