= 2017 Rinnai 250 =

Second race of the 2017 NASCAR Xfinity Series

Race details
- Race 2 of 33 in the 2017 NASCAR Xfinity Series
- Date: March 4, 2017
- Official name: 26th Annual Rinnai 250
- Location: Hampton, Georgia, Atlanta Motor Speedway
- Course: Permanent racing facility
- Course length: 1.54 miles (2.48 km)
- Distance: 163 laps, 251.02 mi (403.977 km)
- Scheduled distance: 163 laps, 251.02 mi (403.977 km)
- Average speed: 128.435 miles per hour (206.696 km/h)

Pole position
Driver	Kyle Busch	Joe Gibbs Racing
- Time: 30.153

Most laps led
Driver	Kevin Harvick	Stewart–Haas Racing
- Laps: 64

Winner
No. 18	Kyle Busch	Joe Gibbs Racing

Television in the United States
- Network: Fox Sports 1
- Announcers: Adam Alexander, Michael Waltrip, Chase Elliott

Radio in the United States
- Radio: Performance Racing Network

The 2017 Rinnai 250 was the second stock car race of the 2017 NASCAR Xfinity Series season, and the 26th iteration of the event. The race was held on Saturday, March 4, 2017, in Hampton, Georgia at Atlanta Motor Speedway, a 1.54 miles (2.48 km) permanent asphalt quad-oval intermediate speedway. The race took the scheduled 163 laps to complete. At race's end, Kyle Busch, driving for Joe Gibbs Racing, would pull away with the lead at the end of the race to win his 87th career NASCAR Xfinity Series win and his first of the season. To fill out the podium, Brad Keselowski of Team Penske and Kyle Larson of Chip Ganassi Racing would finish second and third, respectively.

== Entry list ==
- (R) denotes rookie driver.
- (i) denotes driver who is ineligible for series driver points.

#	Driver	Team	Make
00	Cole Custer (R)	Stewart–Haas Racing	Ford
0	Garrett Smithley	JD Motorsports	Chevrolet
01	Harrison Rhodes	JD Motorsports	Chevrolet
1	Elliott Sadler	JR Motorsports	Chevrolet
2	Austin Dillon (i)	Richard Childress Racing	Chevrolet
3	Ty Dillon (i)	Richard Childress Racing	Chevrolet
4	Ross Chastain	JD Motorsports	Chevrolet
5	Michael Annett	JR Motorsports	Chevrolet
6	Bubba Wallace	Roush Fenway Racing	Ford
07	Ray Black Jr.	SS-Green Light Racing	Chevrolet
7	Justin Allgaier	JR Motorsports	Chevrolet
8	Jeff Green	B. J. McLeod Motorsports	Chevrolet
9	William Byron (R)	JR Motorsports	Chevrolet
11	Blake Koch	Kaulig Racing	Chevrolet
13	Carl Long	MBM Motorsports	Toyota
14	J. J. Yeley	TriStar Motorsports	Toyota
16	Ryan Reed	Roush Fenway Racing	Ford
18	Kyle Busch (i)	Joe Gibbs Racing	Toyota
19	Matt Tifft (R)	Joe Gibbs Racing	Toyota
20	Denny Hamlin (i)	Joe Gibbs Racing	Toyota
21	Daniel Hemric (R)	Richard Childress Racing	Chevrolet
22	Brad Keselowski (i)	Team Penske	Ford
23	Spencer Gallagher (R)	GMS Racing	Chevrolet
24	Corey LaJoie (i)	JGL Racing	Toyota
25	Chris Cockrum	Chris Cockrum Racing	Chevrolet
28	Dakoda Armstrong	JGL Racing	Toyota
33	Brandon Jones	Richard Childress Racing	Chevrolet
39	Ryan Sieg	RSS Racing	Chevrolet
40	Timmy Hill	MBM Motorsports	Toyota
41	Kevin Harvick (i)	Stewart–Haas Racing	Ford
42	Kyle Larson (i)	Chip Ganassi Racing	Chevrolet
48	Brennan Poole	Chip Ganassi Racing	Chevrolet
51	Jeremy Clements	Jeremy Clements Racing	Chevrolet
52	Joey Gase	Jimmy Means Racing	Chevrolet
62	Brendan Gaughan	Richard Childress Racing	Chevrolet
74	Mike Harmon	Mike Harmon Racing	Dodge
78	Clint King	B. J. McLeod Motorsports	Chevrolet
89	Morgan Shepherd	Shepherd Racing Ventures	Chevrolet
90	Brandon Brown	Brandonbilt Motorsports	Chevrolet
93	Jordan Anderson (i)	RSS Racing	Chevrolet
97	Stephen Leicht	Obaika Racing	Chevrolet
98	Aric Almirola (i)	Biagi–DenBeste Racing	Ford
99	David Starr	B. J. McLeod Motorsports with SS-Green Light Racing	Chevrolet
Official entry list

== Practice ==
=== First practice ===
The first practice session was held on Friday, March 3, at 10:00 AM EST and lasted for 55 minutes. Aric Almirola of Biagi–DenBeste Racing set the fastest time in the session, with a lap of 30.567 and an average speed of 181.372 miles per hour (291.890 km/h).

Pos	#	Driver	Team	Make	Time	Speed
1	98	Aric Almirola (i)	Biagi–DenBeste Racing	Ford	30.567	181.372
2	18	Kyle Busch (i)	Joe Gibbs Racing	Toyota	30.597	181.194
3	41	Kevin Harvick (i)	Stewart–Haas Racing	Ford	30.668	180.775
Full first practice results

=== Second practice ===
The second practice session was held on Friday, March 3, at 1:30 PM EST, and lasted for 55 minutes. Daniel Hemric of Richard Childress Racing set the fastest time in the session with a lap of 30.865 and an average speed of 179.621 miles per hour (289.072 km/h).

Pos	#	Driver	Team	Make	Time	Speed
1	21	Daniel Hemric (R)	Richard Childress Racing	Chevrolet	30.865	179.621
2	98	Aric Almirola (i)	Biagi–DenBeste Racing	Ford	31.002	178.827
3	00	Cole Custer (R)	Stewart–Haas Racing	Ford	31.040	178.608
Full second practice results

=== Final practice ===
The final practice session was held on Friday, March 3, at 3:30 PM EST and lasted for 55 minutes. Kyle Busch of Joe Gibbs Racing set the fastest time in the session, with a lap of 30.881 and an average speed of 179.528 miles per hour (288.922 km/h).

Pos	#	Driver	Team	Make	Time	Speed
1	18	Kyle Busch (i)	Joe Gibbs Racing	Toyota	30.881	179.528
2	41	Kevin Harvick (i)	Stewart–Haas Racing	Ford	30.927	179.261
3	98	Aric Almirola (i)	Biagi–DenBeste Racing	Ford	30.966	179.035
Full final practice results

== Qualifying ==
Qualifying was held on Saturday, March 4, at 9:15 AM EST. Since Atlanta Motor Speedway is under 2 miles (3.2 km), the qualifying system was a multi-car system that included three rounds. The first round was 15 minutes, where every driver would be able to set a lap within the 15 minutes. Then, the second round would consist of the fastest 24 cars in Round 1, and drivers would have 10 minutes to set a lap. Round 3 consisted of the fastest 12 drivers from Round 2, and the drivers would have 5 minutes to set a time. Whoever was fastest in Round 3 would win the pole.

Kyle Busch of Joe Gibbs Racing would win the pole after setting a fast enough time in the first two rounds to advance to the next, with Bell achieving a lap in Round 3 with a time of 30.153 and an average speed of 183.862 miles per hour (295.897 km/h).

Three drivers would fail to qualify: Carl Long, Morgan Shepherd, and Mike Harmon.

=== Full qualifying results ===
Pos	#	Driver	Team	Make	Time (R1)	Speed (R1)	Time (R2)	Speed (R2)	Time (R3)	Speed (R3)
1	18	Kyle Busch (i)	Joe Gibbs Racing	Toyota					30.153	183.862
2	9	William Byron	JR Motorsports	Chevrolet					30.167	183.777
3	22	Brad Keselowski (i)	Team Penske	Ford					30.186	183.661
4	42	Kyle Larson (i)	Chip Ganassi Racing	Chevrolet					30.241	183.327
5	20	Denny Hamlin (i)	Joe Gibbs Racing	Toyota					30.278	183.103
6	21	Daniel Hemric (R)	Richard Childress Racing	Chevrolet					30.367	182.567
7	19	Matt Tifft (R)	Joe Gibbs Racing	Toyota					30.410	182.308
8	00	Cole Custer (R)	Stewart–Haas Racing	Ford					30.461	182.003
9	62	Brendan Gaughan	Richard Childress Racing	Chevrolet					30.600	181.176
10	16	Ryan Reed	Roush Fenway Racing	Ford					30.602	181.165
11	48	Brennan Poole	Chip Ganassi Racing	Chevrolet					30.610	181.117
12	41	Kevin Harvick (i)	Stewart–Haas Racing	Ford					30.642	180.928
Eliminated in Round 2
13	6	Bubba Wallace	Roush Fenway Racing	Ford			30.528	181.604	—	—
14	3	Ty Dillon (i)	Richard Childress Racing	Chevrolet			30.574	181.331	—	—
15	98	Aric Almirola (i)	Biagi–DenBeste Racing	Ford			30.578	181.307	—	—
16	7	Justin Allgaier	JR Motorsports	Chevrolet			30.585	181.265	—	—
17	2	Austin Dillon (i)	Richard Childress Racing	Chevrolet			30.595	181.206	—	—
18	5	Michael Annett	JR Motorsports	Chevrolet			30.632	180.987	—	—
19	24	Corey LaJoie (i)	JGL Racing	Toyota			30.788	180.070	—	—
20	14	J. J. Yeley	TriStar Motorsports	Toyota			30.796	180.023	—	—
21	23	Spencer Gallagher (R)	GMS Racing	Chevrolet			30.907	179.377	—	—
22	1	Elliott Sadler	JR Motorsports	Chevrolet	30.179	183.704	—	—	—	—
23	28	Dakoda Armstrong	JGL Racing	Toyota	30.521	181.645	—	—	—	—
24	4	Ross Chastain	JD Motorsports	Chevrolet	30.645	180.910	—	—	—	—
Eliminated in Round 1
25	11	Blake Koch	Kaulig Racing	Chevrolet	30.795	180.029	—	—	—	—
26	93	Jordan Anderson (i)	RSS Racing	Chevrolet	30.816	179.907	—	—	—	—
27	51	Jeremy Clements	Jeremy Clements Racing	Chevrolet	30.865	179.621	—	—	—	—
28	39	Ryan Sieg	RSS Racing	Chevrolet	31.023	178.706	—	—	—	—
29	0	Garrett Smithley	JD Motorsports	Chevrolet	31.225	177.550	—	—	—	—
30	33	Brandon Jones	Richard Childress Racing	Chevrolet	31.247	177.425	—	—	—	—
31	40	Timmy Hill	MBM Motorsports	Toyota	31.250	177.408	—	—	—	—
32	8	Jeff Green	B. J. McLeod Motorsports	Chevrolet	31.367	176.746	—	—	—	—
33	90	Brandon Brown	Brandonbilt Motorsports	Chevrolet	31.376	176.696	—	—	—	—
34	78	Clint King	B. J. McLeod Motorsports	Chevrolet	31.384	176.651	—	—	—	—
35	01	Harrison Rhodes	JD Motorsports	Chevrolet	31.387	176.634	—	—	—	—
36	07	Ray Black Jr.	SS-Green Light Racing	Chevrolet	31.545	175.749	—	—	—	—
37	52	Joey Gase	Jimmy Means Racing	Chevrolet	31.687	174.961	—	—	—	—
38	99	David Starr	BJMM with SS-Green Light Racing	Chevrolet	31.924	173.662	—	—	—	—
39	25	Chris Cockrum	Chris Cockrum Racing	Chevrolet	32.728	169.396	—	—	—	—
40	97	Stephen Leicht	Obaika Racing	Chevrolet	33.580	165.098	—	—	—	—
Failed to qualify
41	13	Carl Long	MBM Motorsports	Toyota	31.837	174.137	—	—	—	—
42	89	Morgan Shepherd	Shepherd Racing Ventures	Chevrolet	32.432	170.942	—	—	—	—
43	74	Mike Harmon	Mike Harmon Racing	Dodge	15:13.779	6.067	—	—	—	—
Official qualifying results
Official starting lineup

== Race results ==
Stage 1 Laps: 40

Pos	#	Driver	Team	Make	Pts
1	22	Brad Keselowski (i)	Team Penske	Ford	0
2	18	Kyle Busch (i)	Joe Gibbs Racing	Toyota	0
3	41	Kevin Harvick (i)	Stewart–Haas Racing	Ford	0
4	20	Denny Hamlin (i)	Joe Gibbs Racing	Toyota	0
5	21	Daniel Hemric (R)	Richard Childress Racing	Chevrolet	6
6	00	Cole Custer (R)	Stewart–Haas Racing	Ford	5
7	9	William Byron	JR Motorsports	Chevrolet	4
8	42	Kyle Larson (i)	Chip Ganassi Racing	Chevrolet	0
9	3	Ty Dillon (i)	Richard Childress Racing	Chevrolet	0
10	1	Elliott Sadler	JR Motorsports	Chevrolet	1

Stage 2 Laps: 40

Pos	#	Driver	Team	Make	Pts
1	41	Kevin Harvick (i)	Stewart–Haas Racing	Ford	0
2	22	Brad Keselowski (i)	Team Penske	Ford	0
3	18	Kyle Busch (i)	Joe Gibbs Racing	Toyota	0
4	42	Kyle Larson (i)	Chip Ganassi Racing	Chevrolet	0
5	20	Denny Hamlin (i)	Joe Gibbs Racing	Toyota	0
6	9	William Byron	JR Motorsports	Chevrolet	5
7	1	Elliott Sadler	JR Motorsports	Chevrolet	4
8	00	Cole Custer (R)	Stewart–Haas Racing	Ford	3
9	21	Daniel Hemric (R)	Richard Childress Racing	Chevrolet	2
10	2	Austin Dillon (i)	Richard Childress Racing	Chevrolet	0

Stage 3 Laps: 83

Pos	#	Driver	Team	Make	Laps	Led	Status	Pts
1	18	Kyle Busch (i)	Joe Gibbs Racing	Toyota	163	26	running	0
2	22	Brad Keselowski (i)	Team Penske	Ford	163	53	running	0
3	42	Kyle Larson (i)	Chip Ganassi Racing	Chevrolet	163	20	running	0
4	41	Kevin Harvick (i)	Stewart–Haas Racing	Ford	163	64	running	0
5	1	Elliott Sadler	JR Motorsports	Chevrolet	163	0	running	37
6	6	Bubba Wallace	Roush Fenway Racing	Ford	163	0	running	31
7	9	William Byron	JR Motorsports	Chevrolet	163	0	running	39
8	2	Austin Dillon (i)	Richard Childress Racing	Chevrolet	163	0	running	0
9	21	Daniel Hemric (R)	Richard Childress Racing	Chevrolet	163	0	running	36
10	00	Cole Custer (R)	Stewart–Haas Racing	Ford	163	0	running	35
11	48	Brennan Poole	Chip Ganassi Racing	Chevrolet	163	0	running	26
12	19	Matt Tifft (R)	Joe Gibbs Racing	Toyota	163	0	running	25
13	62	Brendan Gaughan	Richard Childress Racing	Chevrolet	163	0	running	24
14	33	Brandon Jones	Richard Childress Racing	Chevrolet	163	0	running	23
15	5	Michael Annett	JR Motorsports	Chevrolet	163	0	running	22
16	24	Corey LaJoie (i)	JGL Racing	Toyota	163	0	running	0
17	3	Ty Dillon (i)	Richard Childress Racing	Chevrolet	163	0	running	0
18	16	Ryan Reed	Roush Fenway Racing	Ford	163	0	running	19
19	98	Aric Almirola (i)	Biagi–DenBeste Racing	Ford	163	0	running	0
20	20	Denny Hamlin (i)	Joe Gibbs Racing	Toyota	162	0	running	0
21	28	Dakoda Armstrong	JGL Racing	Toyota	162	0	running	16
22	39	Ryan Sieg	RSS Racing	Chevrolet	161	0	running	15
23	90	Brandon Brown	Brandonbilt Motorsports	Chevrolet	161	0	running	14
24	01	Harrison Rhodes	JD Motorsports	Chevrolet	160	0	running	13
25	4	Ross Chastain	JD Motorsports	Chevrolet	160	0	running	12
26	8	Jeff Green	B. J. McLeod Motorsports	Chevrolet	160	0	running	11
27	0	Garrett Smithley	JD Motorsports	Chevrolet	160	0	running	10
28	23	Spencer Gallagher (R)	GMS Racing	Chevrolet	160	0	running	9
29	07	Ray Black Jr.	SS-Green Light Racing	Chevrolet	159	0	running	8
30	7	Justin Allgaier	JR Motorsports	Chevrolet	159	0	running	7
31	52	Joey Gase	Jimmy Means Racing	Chevrolet	158	0	running	6
32	99	David Starr	BJMM with SS-Green Light Racing	Chevrolet	158	0	running	5
33	40	Timmy Hill	MBM Motorsports	Toyota	156	0	running	4
34	25	Chris Cockrum	Chris Cockrum Racing	Chevrolet	156	0	running	3
35	78	Clint King	B. J. McLeod Motorsports	Chevrolet	139	0	rear gear	2
36	14	J. J. Yeley	TriStar Motorsports	Toyota	128	0	engine	1
37	51	Jeremy Clements	Jeremy Clements Racing	Chevrolet	76	0	suspension	1
38	97	Stephen Leicht	Obaika Racing	Chevrolet	24	0	brakes	1
39	93	Jordan Anderson (i)	RSS Racing	Chevrolet	2	0	ignition	0
40	11	Blake Koch	Kaulig Racing	Chevrolet	2	0	crash	1
Official race results

Previous race: 2017 PowerShares QQQ 300	NASCAR Xfinity Series; 2017 season	Next race: 2017 Boyd Gaming 300
