= Roby Bujdoso =

American racing driver

- Born: March 25, 1993 (age 33); Girard, Ohio, U.S.

ARCA Menards Series career
- 5 races run over 3 years
- Best finish: 66th (2012)
- First race: 2011 Federated Car Care 200 (Toledo)
- Last race: 2013 Menards 200 Presented by Federated Car Care (Toledo)
Wins	Top tens	Poles
0	0	0
- Statistics up to date as of January 24, 2025.

Robert "Roby" Bujdoso (born March 25, 1993) is an American professional former stock car racing driver who has previously competed in the ARCA Racing Series from 2011 to 2015.

== Motorsports results ==
=== ARCA Racing Series ===
(key) (Bold – Pole position awarded by qualifying time. Italics – Pole position earned by points standings or practice time. * – Most laps led.)

ARCA Racing Series results
Year	Team	No.	Make	1	2	3	4	5	6	7	8	9	10	11	12	13	14	15	16	17	18	19	20	21	ARSC	Pts	Ref
2011	Andy Belmont Racing	10	Ford	DAY	TAL	SLM	TOL	NJE	CHI	POC	MCH	WIN	BLN	IOW	IRP	POC	ISF	MAD	DSF	SLM	KAN	TOL; 15			N/A	0	
2012	Csaba Bujdoso	09	Ford	DAY	MOB	SLM	TAL	TOL	ELK	POC	MCH	WIN	NJE	IOW	CHI; 15	IRP	POC	BLN	ISF	MAD	SLM	DSF			66th	315	
2012	Csaba Bujdoso	91	Ford																				KAN; 14		66th	315	
2013	Csaba Bujdoso	91	Ford	DAY	MOB; 20	SLM	TAL	TOL; 33	ELK	POC	MCH	ROA	WIN	CHI	NJM	POC	BLN	ISF	MAD	DSF	IOW	SLM	KEN	KAN	113th	155	
