= Joe Mueller =

American racing driver

- Born: Brighton, Illinois, U.S.

ARCA Menards Series career
- 4 races run over 1 year
- Best finish: 56th (2011)
- First race: 2011 Winchester 200 Presented by Federated Auto Parts (Winchester)
- Last race: 2011 Kentuckiana Ford Dealers ARCA Fall Classic (Salem)
Wins	Top tens	Poles
0	0	0
- Statistics up to date as of January 21, 2025.

Joe Mueller (birth date unknown) is an American former professional stock car racing driver who competed in four races in the ARCA Racing Series in 2011, getting a best finish of 21st at the Illinois State Fairgrounds and DuQuoin State Fairgrounds dirt tracks.

Mueller has made two starts in the Slinger Nationals in 1989.

== Motorsports results ==
=== ARCA Racing Series ===
(key) (Bold – Pole position awarded by qualifying time. Italics – Pole position earned by points standings or practice time. * – Most laps led.)

ARCA Racing Series results
Year	Team	No.	Make	1	2	3	4	5	6	7	8	9	10	11	12	13	14	15	16	17	18	19	ARSC	Pts	Ref
2011	Rockland Motorsports	65	Chevy	DAY	TAL	SLM	TOL	NJE	CHI	POC	MCH	WIN; 23	BLN	IOW	IRP	POC	ISF; 21	MAD	DSF; 21	SLM; 32	KAN	TOL	56th	435	
