= Kenzie Ruston Hemric =

American stock car racing driver

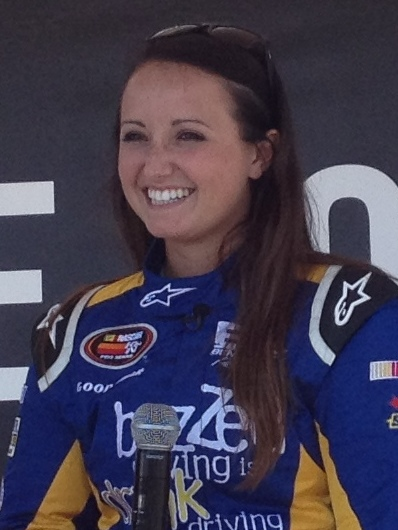
- Ruston at Dover International Speedway in 2014
- Born: Kenzie Ruston; October 12, 1991 (age 35) El Reno, Oklahoma, U.S.
- Relatives: Daniel Hemric (husband)
- Debut season: 2013

NASCAR K&N Pro Series East
- Years active: 2013–2015
- Teams: Turner Scott Motorsports, Ben Kennedy Racing, Rev Racing
- Car number: 4
- Crew chief: Mark Green
- Starts: 44
- Championships: 0
- Wins: 0
- Poles: 0
- Best finish: 6th in 2013
- Finished last season: 11th in 2015

Previous series
- 2011: ARCA Racing Series

Kenzie Ruston Hemric (born October 12, 1991) is an American former professional stock car racing driver. She last competed in the NASCAR K&N Pro Series East in 2015, driving the No. 4 Toyota Camry for Rev Racing. Hemric is married to current NASCAR Craftsman Truck Series driver and 2021 NASCAR Xfinity Champion Daniel Hemric.

Hemric began her professional stock car racing career in the 2011 ARCA Racing Series, driving four races for Venturini Motorsports. She later competed as a NASCAR Drive for Diversity member in the K&N Pro Series East, where she competed for three seasons (2013–15). Her best career finish came in 2014 at Iowa Speedway, where she finished second.

== Racing career ==
=== Early career ===
Ruston both raced and played volleyball in high school before deciding to focus on racing full-time prior to her senior year; she began racing Bandoleros at Texas Motor Speedway (TMS) when she was 14 years old. When she was 16, she switched to Legends car racing, competing in the track's Semi-Pro and Young Lions divisions, finishing third in the latter's Winter Series. In addition, she raced in TMS' Summer Stampede, finishing second, and in the top-ten in Charlotte Motor Speedway's Summer Shootout. Upon turning 17, Ruston moved to North Carolina. In 2009, Ruston won TMS' Winter Series, Summer Stampede and the track's Driver of the Year award, along with the U.S. Legends asphalt championship, the first woman to win the title. The next year, she began racing in super late models, finishing 12th in the PASS Series Southern Division's championship.

=== Stock car racing ===
In 2011, Ruston began competing in stock cars. She made four ARCA Racing Series races with Venturini Motorsports, making her debut at Toledo Speedway in the No. 25 Toyota, and finished tenth. She switched to No. 55 for three additional races, finishing tenth, 12th, and 26th. During the year, she also competed in the Champion Racing Association, winning at Lucas Oil Raceway at Indianapolis. In December, she participated in the Snowball Derby at Five Flags Speedway for Jeff Fultz, finishing 31st after a crash on lap 145.

==== NASCAR ====
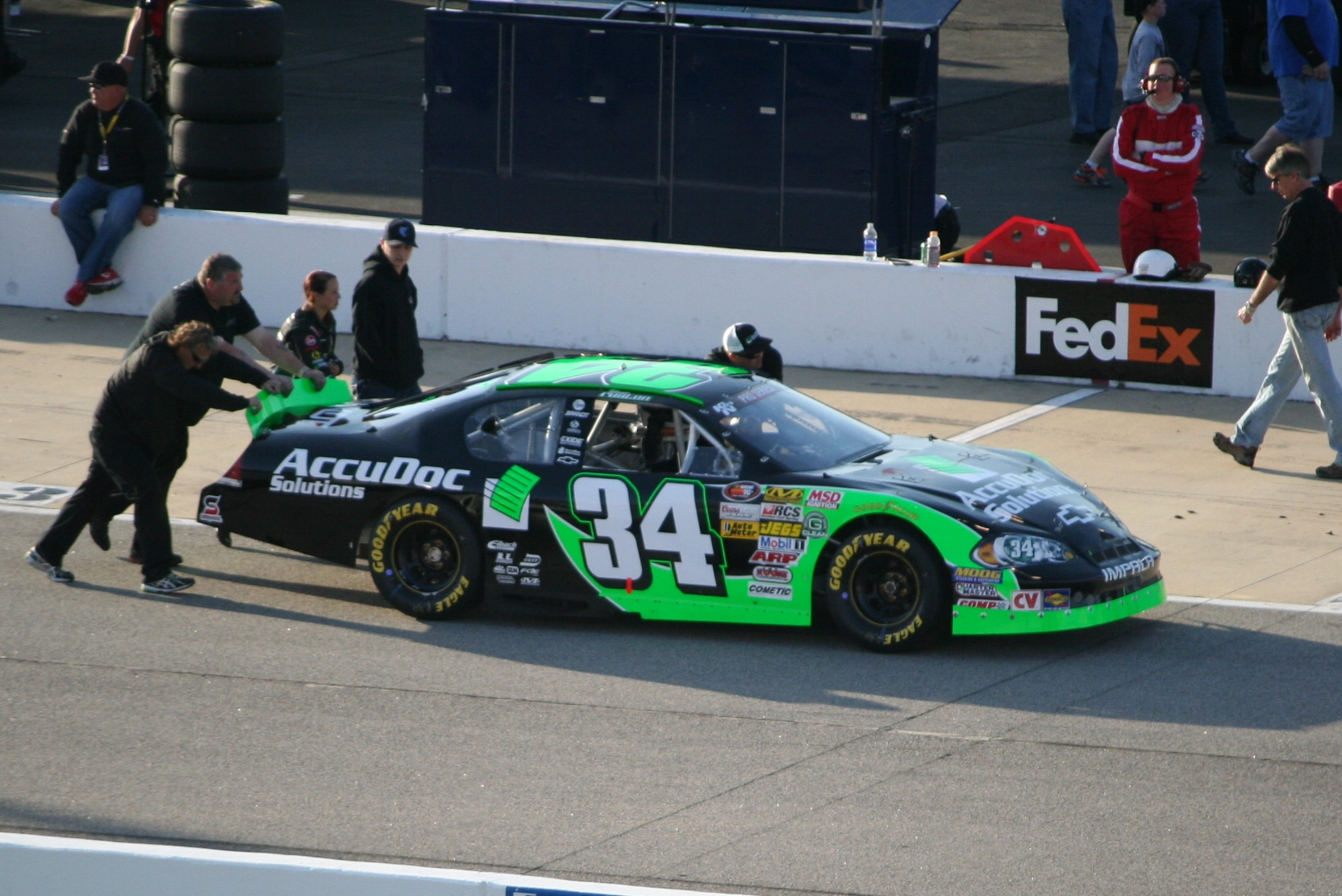
Ruston's No. 34 car at Richmond International Raceway in 2013

In 2013, Ruston was signed by Turner Scott Motorsports to contest the 2013 NASCAR K&N Pro Series East season, and in June, she was named a member of the NASCAR Next program, the first woman to join the program. She ended the year with four top-fives, including a best finish of third at Greenville-Pickens Speedway, and finished sixth in the points standings.

For the 2014 season, Ruston was signed by Ben Kennedy Racing. She was not retained by Kennedy at the end of the season due to sponsorship, being replaced by Kaz Grala.

On January 26, 2015, Ruston was announced as a member of the 2015 Drive for Diversity roster, joining Rev Racing for the full 2015 NASCAR K&N Pro Series East season. She finished 11th in the points standings, with a best finish of sixth at Motordrome Speedway.

== Personal life ==
Ruston's father, Darren, was a dirt bike racer in Oklahoma, while her step-grandfather, Jerry Morrison, was an Oklahoma dirt track racer. The youngest of two daughters, Ruston was a cheerleader and volleyball, soccer, and basketball player in high school.

On July 28, 2015, Ruston became engaged to Camping World Truck Series driver Daniel Hemric. They married on January 7, 2017. In November 2019, the Hemrics announced that they were expecting their first child. Their daughter was born on May 9, 2020. In August 2022, the Hemrics announced that they were expecting their second child. Their son was born on December 23, 2022.

== Motorsports career results ==
=== Career summary ===
| Season | Series | Team | Races | Wins | Top 5s | Top 10s | Poles | Points | Position |
|---|---|---|---|---|---|---|---|---|---|
| 2011 | ARCA Racing Series | Venturini Motorsports | 4 | 0 | 0 | 2 | 0 | 635 | 35th |
| 2013 | K&N Pro Series East | Turner Scott Motorsports | 14 | 0 | 4 | 6 | 0 | 459 | 6th |
| 2014 | K&N Pro Series East | Ben Kennedy Racing | 16 | 0 | 3 | 7 | 0 | 522 | 9th |
| 2015 | K&N Pro Series East | Rev Racing | 13 | 0 | 0 | 4 | 0 | 408 | 11th |

=== NASCAR ===
(key) (Bold – Pole position awarded by qualifying time. Italics – Pole position earned by points standings or practice time. * – Most laps led.)

==== K&N Pro Series East ====
NASCAR K&N Pro Series East results
| Year | Team | No. | Make | 1 | 2 | 3 | 4 | 5 | 6 | 7 | 8 | 9 | 10 | 11 | 12 | 13 | 14 | 15 | 16 | NKNPSEC | Pts | Ref |
|---|---|---|---|---|---|---|---|---|---|---|---|---|---|---|---|---|---|---|---|---|---|---|
| 2013 | Turner Scott Motorsports | 34 | Chevy | BRI; 11 | GRE; 3 | FIF; 5 | RCH; 19 | BGS; 4 | IOW; 26 | LGY; 12 | COL; 8 | IOW; 5 | VIR; 12 | GRE; 8 | NHA; 20 | DOV; 13 | RAL; 11 | | | 6th | 459 | |
| 2014 | Ben Kennedy Racing | 96 | Chevy | NSM; 6 | DAY; 6 | BRI; 22 | GRE; 12 | RCH; 35 | IOW; 13 | BGS; 8 | FIF; 4 | LGY; 3 | NHA; 14 | COL; 12 | IOW; 2 | GLN; 9 | VIR; 11 | GRE; 12 | DOV; 14 | 9th | 522 | |
| 2015 | Rev Racing | 4 | Toyota | NSM; 10 | GRE; 14 | BRI; 27 | IOW; 15 | BGS; 9 | LGY; 12 | COL; 10 | NHA; 16 | IOW; 22 | GLN; 18 | MOT; 6 | VIR; 14 | RCH; 22 | DOV; 13 | | | 11th | 408 | |

=== ARCA Racing Series ===
(key) (Bold – Pole position awarded by qualifying time. Italics – Pole position earned by points standings or practice time. * – Most laps led.)

ARCA Racing Series results
| Year | Team | No. | Make | 1 | 2 | 3 | 4 | 5 | 6 | 7 | 8 | 9 | 10 | 11 | 12 | 13 | 14 | 15 | 16 | 17 | 18 | 19 | ARSC | Pts | Ref |
|---|---|---|---|---|---|---|---|---|---|---|---|---|---|---|---|---|---|---|---|---|---|---|---|---|---|
| 2011 | Venturini Motorsports | 25 | Toyota | DAY | TAL | SLM | TOL; 10 | NJE | CHI | POC | MCH | WIN | | | | | | | | | | | 35th | 635 | |
| 2011 | Venturini Motorsports | 55 | Toyota | | | | | | | | | | BLN; 10 | IOW; 12 | IRP; 26 | POC | ISF | MAD | DSF | SLM | KAN | TOL | 35th | 635 | |

^{*} Season still in progress
^{1} Ineligible for series points
