= Marc Easton =

American racing driver

- Born: December 10, 1983 (age 42); Saranac Lake, New York, U.S.

ARCA Menards Series career
- 19 races run over 3 years
- Best finish: 38th (2011)
- First race: 2009 Pocono 200 (Pocono)
- Last race: 2011 Kansas Lottery 98.9 (Kansas)
Wins	Top tens	Poles
0	0	0
- Statistics up to date as of January 13, 2025.

Marc Easton (born December 10, 1983) is an American former professional stock car racing driver who competed in the ARCA Racing Series from 2009 to 2011.

== Motorsports results ==
=== ARCA Racing Series ===
(key) (Bold – Pole position awarded by qualifying time. Italics – Pole position earned by points standings or practice time. * – Most laps led.)

ARCA Racing Series results
Year	Team	No.	Make	1	2	3	4	5	6	7	8	9	10	11	12	13	14	15	16	17	18	19	20	21	ARSC	Pts	Ref
2009	Fast Track Racing Enterprises	10	Chevy	DAY	SLM	CAR	TAL	KEN	TOL	POC; 35	MCH; 39	MFD; 30	IOW	KEN	BLN						NJE; 33	SLM	KAN	CAR	80th	295	
2009	Fast Track Racing Enterprises	68	Dodge													POC; 34	ISF	CHI	TOL	DSF					80th	295	
2010	Fast Track Racing Enterprises	10	Dodge	DAY	PBE; 32	SLM						IOW; 35	MFD; 25	POC	BLN	NJE	ISF	CHI	DSF	TOL	SLM	KAN	CAR		48th	455	
2010	Fast Track Racing Enterprises	18	Chevy				TEX; 35			POC; 33	MCH														48th	455	
2010	Fast Track Racing Enterprises	10	Chevy					TAL; 40	TOL; 31																48th	455	
2011	Fast Track Racing Enterprises	10	Chevy	DAY	TAL	SLM; 24				POC; 28			BLN; 30	IOW	IRP	POC	ISF	MAD	DSF	SLM					38th	595	
2011	Fast Track Racing Enterprises	10	Ford				TOL; 26	NJE																	38th	595	
2011	Fast Track Racing Enterprises	11	Dodge						CHI; 25																38th	595	
2011	Fast Track Racing Enterprises	14	Dodge								MCH; 36	WIN													38th	595	
2011	Fast Track Racing Enterprises	18	Chevy																		KAN; 34	TOL			38th	595	
