= Matt Merrell =

American racing driver (born 1985)

- Born: April 19, 1985 (age 41); Portland, Texas, U.S.

NASCAR FedEx Freight Truck Series career
- 2 races run over 1 year
- 2012 position: 54th
- Best finish: 54th (2012)
- First race: 2012 Kroger 200 (Martinsville)
- Last race: 2012 Lucas Oil 150 (Phoenix)
Wins	Top tens	Poles
0	0	0

Matt Merrell (born April 19, 1985) is an American former professional stock car racing driver. He has raced in the NASCAR Camping World Truck Series and the ARCA Racing Series, where he scored one win in 2011.

== Motorsports career results ==
=== NASCAR ===
(key) (Bold – Pole position awarded by qualifying time. Italics – Pole position earned by points standings or practice time. * – Most laps led.)

==== Camping World Truck Series ====
NASCAR Camping World Truck Series results
Year	Team	No.	Make	1	2	3	4	5	6	7	8	9	10	11	12	13	14	15	16	17	18	19	20	21	22	NCWTC	Pts	Ref
2012	Win-Tron Racing	35	Chevy	DAY	MAR	CAR	KAN	CLT	DOV	TEX	KEN	IOW	CHI	POC	MCH	BRI	ATL	IOW	KEN	LVS	TAL	MAR; 34	TEX	PHO; 11	HOM	54th	43	

=== ARCA Racing Series ===
(key) (Bold – Pole position awarded by qualifying time. Italics – Pole position earned by points standings or practice time. * – Most laps led.)

ARCA Racing Series results
Year	Team	No.	Make	1	2	3	4	5	6	7	8	9	10	11	12	13	14	15	16	17	18	19	20	21	22	23	ARSC	Pts	Ref
2007	Country Joe Racing	32	Dodge	DAY	USA	NSH	SLM	KAN	WIN	KEN	TOL; 16	IOW	POC	MCH	BLN	KEN	POC	NSH	ISF	MIL	GTW	DSF	CHI	SLM	TAL	TOL	131st	150	
2008	Win-Tron Racing	32	Dodge	DAY	SLM	IOW	KEN	CAR	KEN	TOL	POC	MCH	CAY	KEN; 40	BLN	POC	NSH	ISF	DSF	CHI	SLM; 26	NJE	TAL	TOL			123rd	130	
2009	Win-Tron Racing	32	Dodge	DAY	SLM; 11	CAR; 3	TAL	KEN	TOL; 5	POC; 5	MCH	MFD; 20	IOW; 18	KEN	BLN; 2	POC; 2	ISF; 10	CHI	TOL	DSF	NJE	SLM; 13	KAN	CAR			21st	1865	
2011	Win-Tron Racing	32	Toyota	DAY; 3	TAL; 10			NJE; 14	CHI; 24		MCH; 15																13th	2350	
2011	Win-Tron Racing	32	Dodge			SLM; 5	TOL; 3			POC; 10		WIN; 25	BLN; 1	IOW; 29	IRP	POC	ISF	MAD	DSF	SLM	KAN	TOL					13th	2350	
2012	Win-Tron Racing	32	Toyota	DAY	MOB	SLM	TAL	TOL	ELK	POC	MCH	WIN	NJE	IOW	CHI	IRP	POC; 12	BLN	ISF	MAD	SLM	DSF	KAN				101st	170	
