= John Blankenship =

American racing driver

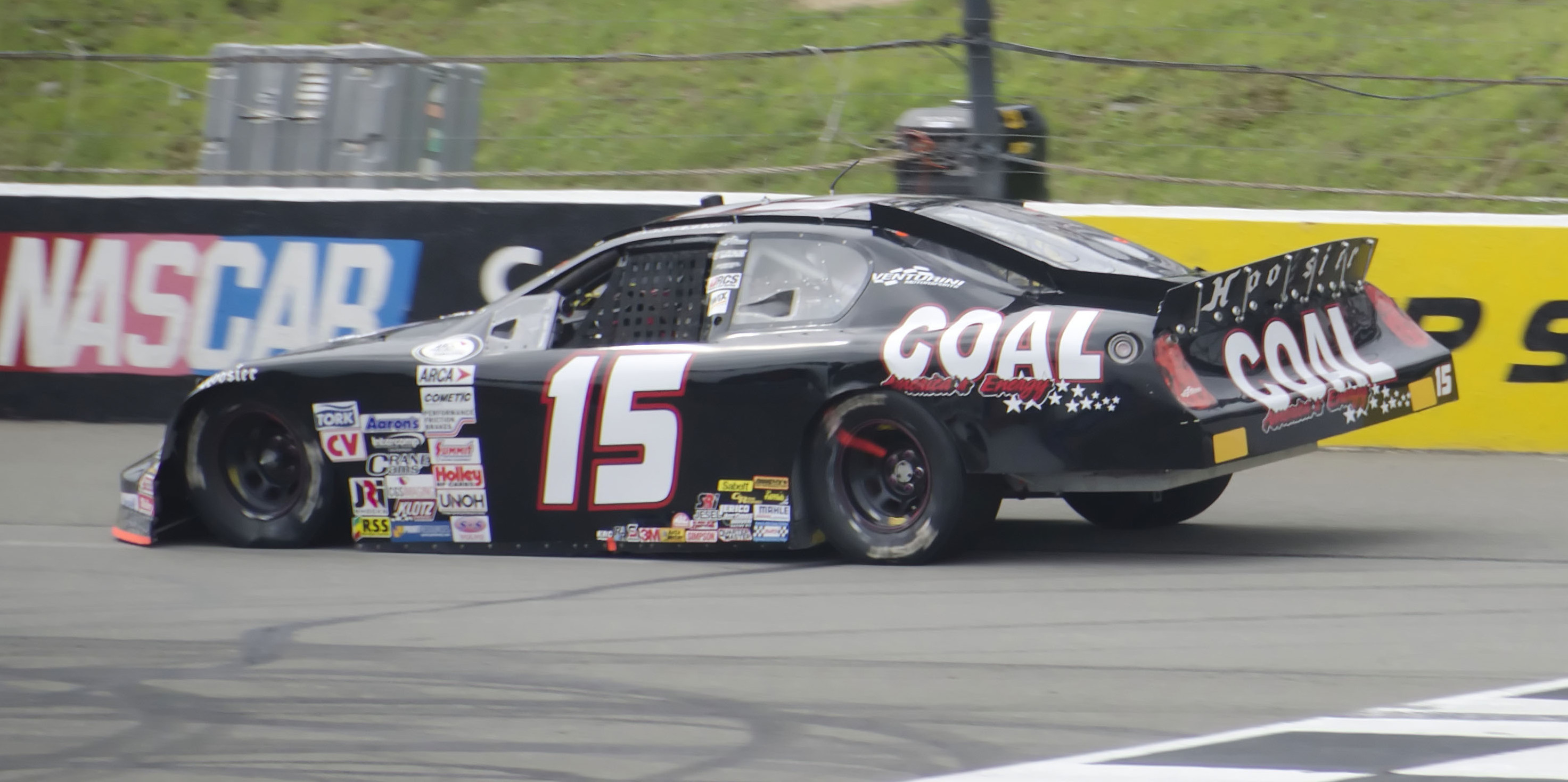
- Blankenship's No. 15 car at Pocono Raceway in 2011
- Born: July 3, 1981 (age 45); Williamson, West Virginia, U.S.

NASCAR O'Reilly Auto Parts Series career
- 4 races run over 1 year
- Best finish: 50th (2012)
- First race: 2012 U.S. Cellular 250 (Iowa)
- Last race: 2012 Ford EcoBoost 300 (Homestead)
Wins	Top tens	Poles
0	0	0

ARCA Menards Series career
- 5 races run over 2 years
- Best finish: 49th (2011)
- First race: 2011 Winchester 200 Presented by Federated Auto Parts (Winchester)
- Last race: 2012 RainEater Wiper Blades 200 (Michigan)
Wins	Top tens	Poles
0	2	0
- Statistics up to date as of January 14, 2025.

John Blankenship (born July 3, 1981) is an American professional stock car racing driver who has competed in the NASCAR Nationwide Series and the ARCA Racing Series.

Blankenship has also previously competed in the NASCAR K&N Pro Series East, the Lucas Oil Late Model Dirt Series, the World of Outlaws Late Model Series, the Lucas Oil Midwest LateModel Racing Association, and the Southern All Star Dirt Racing Series.

== Motorsports results ==
=== NASCAR ===
(key) (Bold - Pole position awarded by qualifying time. Italics - Pole position earned by points standings or practice time. * – Most laps led.)

==== Nationwide Series ====
NASCAR Nationwide Series results
Year	Team	No.	Make	1	2	3	4	5	6	7	8	9	10	11	12	13	14	15	16	17	18	19	20	21	22	23	24	25	26	27	28	29	30	31	32	33	NNSC	Pts	Ref
2012	Tommy Baldwin Racing	44	Chevy	DAY	PHO	LVS	BRI	CAL	TEX	RCH	TAL	DAR	IOW	CLT	DOV	MCH	ROA	KEN	DAY	NHA	CHI	IND	IOW; 23	GLN	CGV	BRI	ATL	RCH	CHI	KEN	DOV	CLT	KAN	TEX; 26	PHO; 25	HOM; 36	50th	66	

==== K&N Pro Series East ====
NASCAR K&N Pro Series East results
Year	Team	No.	Make	1	2	3	4	5	6	7	8	9	10	11	12	NKNPSEC	Pts	Ref
2011	Venturini Motorsports	25	Toyota	GRE	SBO	RCH	IOW	BGS	JFC	LGY	NHA	COL; 22	GRE	NHA	DOV	59th	97	

=== ARCA Racing Series ===
(key) (Bold – Pole position awarded by qualifying time. Italics – Pole position earned by points standings or practice time. * – Most laps led.)

ARCA Racing Series results
Year	Team	No.	Make	1	2	3	4	5	6	7	8	9	10	11	12	13	14	15	16	17	18	19	20	ARSC	Pts	Ref
2011	Venturini Motorsports	55	Chevy	DAY	TAL	SLM	TOL	NJE	CHI	POC	MCH	WIN; 10	BLN	IOW	IRP									49th	480	
2011	Venturini Motorsports	15	Chevy													POC; 20	ISF	MAD	DSF	SLM				49th	480	
2011	Venturini Motorsports	15	Toyota																		KAN; 12	TOL		49th	480	
2012	Venturini Motorsports	20	Chevy	DAY	MOB; DNQ																			56th	380	
2012	Venturini Motorsports	20	Toyota			SLM; 15	TAL	TOL	ELK	POC														56th	380	
2012	Venturini Motorsports	66	Toyota								MCH; 6	WIN	NJE	IOW	CHI	IRP	POC	BLN	ISF	MAD	SLM	DSF	KAN	56th	380	
