= Will Vaught =

American racing driver

- Born: October 13, 1986 (age 40); Crane, Missouri, U.S.

ARCA Menards Series career
- 5 races run over 2 years
- Best finish: 34th (2011)
- First race: 2006 Kansas Lottery $200 Grand (Kansas)
- Last race: 2011 Southern Illinois 100 (DuQuoin)
Wins	Top tens	Poles
0	3	0
- Statistics up to date as of January 21, 2025.

Will Vaught (born October 13, 1986) is an American professional stock car racing driver who has previously competed in the ARCA Racing Series from 2011 to 2012.

Vaught also competed in series such as the Lucas Oil Late Model Dirt Series, the World of Outlaws Late Model Series, the Lucas Oil Midwest LateModel Racing Association, and the MARS Racing Series.

== Motorsports results ==
=== ARCA Racing Series ===
(key) (Bold – Pole position awarded by qualifying time. Italics – Pole position earned by points standings or practice time. * – Most laps led.)

ARCA Racing Series results
Year	Team	No.	Make	1	2	3	4	5	6	7	8	9	10	11	12	13	14	15	16	17	18	19	20	21	22	23	ARSC	Pts	Ref
2006	Vision Racing	37	Chevy	DAY	NSH	SLM	WIN	KEN	TOL	POC	MCH	KAN; DNQ	KEN	BLN	POC	GTW; 34	NSH	MCH	ISF	MIL	TOL	DSF	CHI	SLM	TAL	IOW	149th	85	
2006	Vision Racing	13	Chevy									KAN; 30															149th	85	
2011	Will Vaught	54	Chevy	DAY; DNQ																							34th	640	
2011	Phoenix Racing	51	Chevy		TAL; 9	SLM	TOL	NJE	CHI	POC	MCH	WIN	BLN	IOW	IRP	POC											34th	640	
2011	Venturini Motorsports	55	Chevy														ISF; 5	MAD	DSF; 3	SLM	KAN	TOL					34th	640	
