= Richard Harriman =

American racing driver (born 1987)

- Born: September 29, 1987 (age 39); Snohomish, Washington, U.S.

NASCAR O'Reilly Auto Parts Series career
- 2 races run over 2 years
- 2014 position: 76th
- Best finish: 76th (2014)
- First race: 2013 U.S. Cellular 250 (Iowa)
- Last race: 2014 EnjoyIllinois.com 300 (Chicago)
Wins	Top tens	Poles
0	0	0

NASCAR FedEx Freight Truck Series career
- 4 races run over 2 years
- First race: 2009 AAA Insurance 200 (IRP)
- Last race: 2009 Ford 200 (Homestead–Miami)
Wins	Top tens	Poles
0	0	0

Richard Harriman (born September 29, 1987) is an American professional stock car racing driver. He last competed part-time in the NASCAR Nationwide Series, driving the No. 23 Chevrolet for Rick Ware Racing.

== Racing career ==
=== NASCAR Nationwide Series ===
In 2013, Harriman made his Nationwide Series debut. He drove the No. 23 Ford for Rick Ware Racing at Iowa, finishing 29th after starting 39th.

In 2014, Harriman returned to the No. 23 Chevrolet and drove at Chicagoland. He finished 32nd after starting 38th due to suspension problems.

=== NASCAR Camping World Truck Series ===
In 2009, Harriman made his NASCAR debut. He drove the No. 48 Chevrolet Silverado for Andy Hillenburg’s Fast Track Racing Enterprises. His first race was at Lucas Oil Raceway (then Indianapolis Raceway Park), where he finished 27th after starting 31st. In his next race at Loudon, he qualified in 28th place and again finished 27th.

== Motorsports career results ==
=== NASCAR ===
(key) (Bold – Pole position awarded by qualifying time. Italics – Pole position earned by points standings or practice time. * – Most laps led.)

==== Nationwide Series ====
NASCAR Nationwide Series results
Year	Team	No.	Make	1	2	3	4	5	6	7	8	9	10	11	12	13	14	15	16	17	18	19	20	21	22	23	24	25	26	27	28	29	30	31	32	33	NNSC	Pts	Ref
2013	Rick Ware Racing	23	Ford	DAY	PHO	LVS	BRI	CAL	TEX	RCH	TAL	DAR	CLT	DOV	IOW	MCH	ROA	KEN	DAY	NHA	CHI	IND	IOW; 29	GLN	MOH	BRI	ATL	RCH	CHI	KEN	DOV	KAN	CLT	TEX	PHO	HOM	77th	15	
2014	Rick Ware Racing	23	Chevy	DAY	PHO	LVS	BRI	CAL	TEX	DAR	RCH	TAL	IOW	CLT	DOV	MCH	ROA	KEN	DAY	NHA	CHI; 32	IND	IOW	GLN	MOH	BRI	ATL	RCH	CHI	KEN	DOV	KAN	CLT	TEX	PHO	HOM	76th	12	

==== Camping World Truck Series ====
NASCAR Camping World Truck Series results
Year	Team	No.	Make	1	2	3	4	5	6	7	8	9	10	11	12	13	14	15	16	17	18	19	20	21	22	23	24	25	NCWTC	Pts	Ref
2009	Fast Track Racing Enterprises	48	Chevy	DAY	CAL	ATL	MAR	KAN	CLT	DOV	TEX	MCH	MLW	MEM	KEN	IRP; 27	NSH	BRI	CHI	IOW	GTW	NHA; 27	LVS	MAR	TAL	TEX			56th	292	
2009	Fast Track Racing Enterprises	47	Chevy																								PHO; 31	HOM; 35	56th	292	
2010	Fast Track Racing Enterprises	48	Chevy	DAY	ATL	MAR	NSH	KAN	DOV	CLT	TEX	MCH	IOW	GTW; DNQ	IRP	POC	NSH	DAR	BRI	CHI	KEN	NHA	LVS	MAR	TAL	TEX	PHO	HOM	NA	-	

=== ARCA Racing Series ===
(key) (Bold – Pole position awarded by qualifying time. Italics – Pole position earned by points standings or practice time. * – Most laps led.)

ARCA Racing Series results
Year	Team	No.	Make	1	2	3	4	5	6	7	8	9	10	11	12	13	14	15	16	17	18	19	20	ARSC	Pts	Ref
2010	Fast Track Racing Enterprises	18	Dodge	DAY	PBE	SLM	TEX	TAL	TOL	POC	MCH	IOW	MFD	POC	BLN	NJE; 34	ISF; 26		DSF; 32					44th	530	
2010	Fast Track Racing Enterprises	10	Dodge															CHI; 37		TOL; 27	SLM; 26	KAN; 34	CAR	44th	530	
2011	Fast Track Racing Enterprises	11	Chevy	DAY	TAL; 23	SLM	TOL	NJE													KAN; 32			19th	1595	
2011	Fast Track Racing Enterprises	10	Chevy						CHI; 27		MCH; 35				IRP; 34			MAD; 31						19th	1595	
2011	Andy Belmont Racing	14	Dodge							POC; 33						POC; DNQ			DSF; 33					19th	1595	
2011	Fast Track Racing Enterprises	11	Ford									WIN; 21	BLN; 24							SLM; 26				19th	1595	
2011	Fast Track Racing Enterprises	18	Chevy											IOW; 39			ISF; 31							19th	1595	
2011	Fast Track Racing Enterprises	18	Ford																			TOL; DNQ		19th	1595	
2012	Fast Track Racing Enterprises	10	Ford	DAY	MOB	SLM	TAL	TOL	ELK	POC	MCH	WIN	NJE	IOW	CHI; 29	IRP	POC	BLN	ISF	MAD	SLM	DSF	KAN	135th	85	
