= Kyle Fowler =

American racing driver

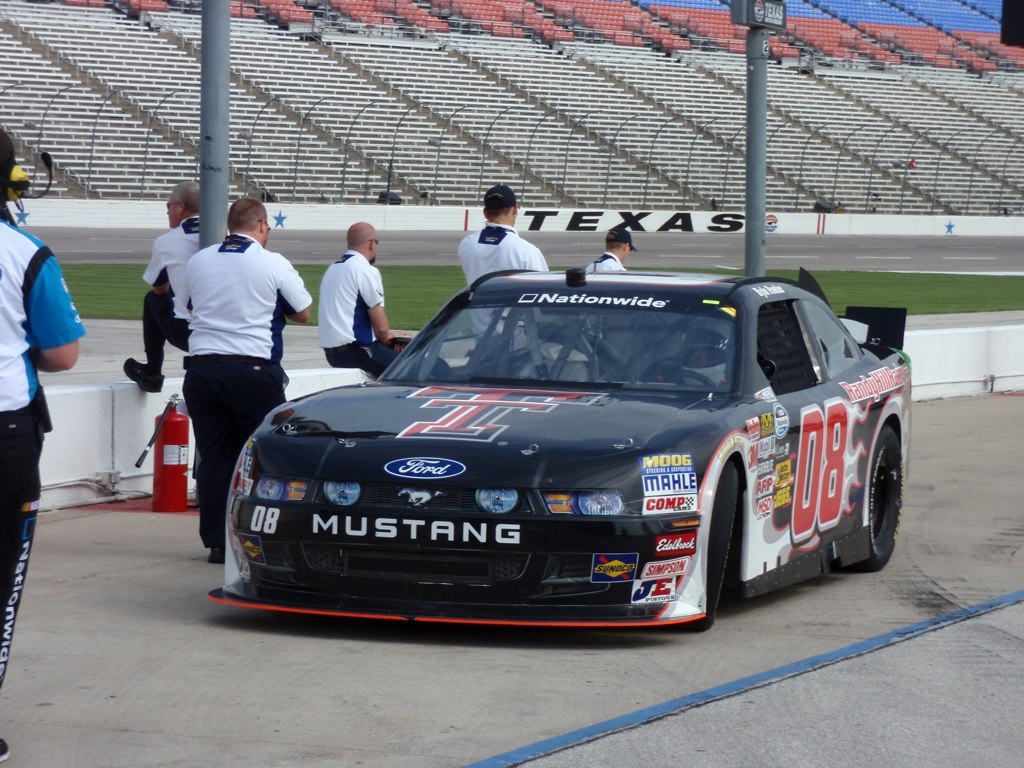
- Fowler's 2012 Nationwide Series car
- Born: June 7, 1992 (age 34); Smyrna, Georgia, U.S.

NASCAR Cup Series career
- 2 races run over 2 years
- 2015 position: 50th
- Best finish: 50th (2015)
- First race: 2014 Goody's Headache Relief Shot 500 (Martinsville)
- Last race: 2015 Goody's Headache Relief Shot 500 (Martinsville)
Wins	Top tens	Poles
0	0	0

NASCAR O'Reilly Auto Parts Series career
- 16 races run over 4 years
- 2015 position: 106th
- Best finish: 38th (2012)
- First race: 2012 Sam's Town 300 (Las Vegas)
- Last race: 2015 Hisense 300 (Charlotte)
Wins	Top tens	Poles
0	0	0

NASCAR FedEx Freight Truck Series career
- 1 race run over 1 year
- 2015 position: 101st
- Best finish: 101st (2015)
- First race: 2015 North Carolina Education Lottery 200 (Charlotte)
Wins	Top tens	Poles
0	0	0
- Statistics up to date as of November 1, 2015.

Kyle Fowler (born June 7, 1992) is an American former professional stock car racing driver. He has previously competed in the NASCAR Sprint Cup Series, the NASCAR Xfinity Series, the NASCAR Camping World Truck Series, and the ARCA Racing Series.

== Career ==
Born in Smyrna, Georgia, Fowler started racing at the age of four racing in Quarter Midget racing, competing all over the country winning numerous championships in various divisions (Sr. Honda, Lite 160 and Lite AA). At the age of eight, Fowler moved to the Bandolero Series where he was the GA State Champion. At the age of twelve, Fowler moved to Legends car racing at tracks such as Atlanta Motor Speedway, Charlotte Motor Speedway and many other tracks throughout the south-east and beyond. Fowler had a banner season in 2006 in which he competed for five championships in different Legends Car series around the region and won three of them and finished second in the other two.

Fowler then moved up to late model racing, competing in the GAS Series where he was the rookie of the year in 2007, where he made a big splash by posting fourteen top-ten finishes in seventeen starts. The season ended with a solid top-fifteen run in the Snowflake 100 at Five Flags Speedway where more than 75 Late Models were on hand for the biggest Pro Late Model race of the season.

2008 saw Fowler try his hand in the nationally-televised ASA Late Model Series. He scored a career-best second-place finish at Lanier National Speedway (GA) in the James Garrison Memorial 100. He backed that up with a pole position and a runner-up finish at Peach State Speedway (GA) just a few weeks later. In 2009, Fowler started off the year with another runner-up finish in the prestigious SpeedFest at Lanier National Speedway (GA). In April, he made his first-ever K&N Pro Series East start for Ken Schrader Racing.

It was on to the ARCA Racing Series in 2010 where he made five starts and had four finishes inside the top-twenty, while getting the chance to hone his skills with the help of veteran NASCAR driver Ken Schrader and Ken Schrader Racing.

In 2011, Fowler raced with the Venturini Motorsports team gaining three top-three qualifying spots, He led laps at the Daytona International Speedway and Chicagoland Speedway. Mechanical failure cost him four of the year's five races.

In 2012, Fowler drove in the Nationwide Series for team owner Randy Hill, running the No. 08 Ford. Hill ran a low budget team that ran with engines less powerful than their rivals. Fowler ran seven races, with a best of 21st at Texas. In 2013, Fowler drove a limited Nationwide Series schedule with Go Green Racing.

In 2014, Fowler made his Sprint Cup Series debut in the Goody's Headache Relief Shot 500 at Martinsville Speedway.

== Motorsports career results ==
=== NASCAR ===
(key) (Bold – Pole position awarded by qualifying time. Italics – Pole position earned by points standings or practice time. * – Most laps led.)

==== Sprint Cup Series ====
NASCAR Sprint Cup Series results
Year	Team	No.	Make	1	2	3	4	5	6	7	8	9	10	11	12	13	14	15	16	17	18	19	20	21	22	23	24	25	26	27	28	29	30	31	32	33	34	35	36	NSCC	Pts	Ref
2014	Go FAS Racing	32	Ford	DAY	PHO	LVS	BRI	CAL	MAR	TEX	DAR	RCH	TAL	KAN	CLT	DOV	POC	MCH	SON	KEN	DAY	NHA	IND	POC	GLN	MCH	BRI	ATL	RCH	CHI	NHA	DOV	KAN	CLT	TAL	MAR; 28	TEX	PHO	HOM	64th	0^{1}	
2015	Go FAS Racing	32	Ford	DAY	ATL	LVS	PHO	CAL	MAR	TEX	BRI	RCH	TAL	KAN	CLT	DOV	POC	MCH	SON	DAY	KEN	NHA	IND	POC	GLN	MCH	BRI	DAR	RCH	CHI	NHA	DOV	CLT	KAN	TAL	MAR; 41	TEX	PHO	HOM	50th	3	

==== Xfinity Series ====
NASCAR Xfinity Series results
Year	Team	No.	Make	1	2	3	4	5	6	7	8	9	10	11	12	13	14	15	16	17	18	19	20	21	22	23	24	25	26	27	28	29	30	31	32	33	NXSC	Pts	Ref
2012	Randy Hill Racing	08	Ford	DAY	PHO	LVS; 28	BRI; 28	CAL	TEX; 21	RCH	TAL	DAR	IOW	CLT; 23	DOV	MCH	ROA	KEN	DAY	NHA	CHI	IND; 32	IOW	GLN	CGV	BRI	ATL; 25	RCH	CHI	KEN	DOV	CLT; 24	KAN	TEX	PHO	HOM	38th	127	
2013	Go Green Racing	79	Ford	DAY	PHO	LVS	BRI	CAL	TEX	RCH	TAL	DAR; 34	CLT; 26	DOV	IOW	MCH	ROA	KEN	DAY	NHA	CHI; 26	IND; 20	IOW; 28	GLN	MOH	BRI; 29	ATL; 26	RCH	CHI	KEN	DOV	KAN	CLT	TEX	PHO	HOM	43rd	119	
2014	DRG Motorsports	86	Chevy	DAY	PHO	LVS	BRI	CAL	TEX	DAR	RCH	TAL	IOW	CLT; 32	DOV	MCH	ROA	KEN	DAY	NHA	CHI	IND	IOW	GLN	MOH	BRI	ATL	RCH	CHI	KEN	DOV	KAN	CLT	TEX	PHO	HOM	75th	12	
2015	JGL Racing	26	Toyota	DAY	ATL	LVS	PHO	CAL	TEX	BRI	RCH	TAL	IOW	CLT; 27	DOV	MCH	CHI	DAY	KEN	NHA	IND	IOW	GLN	MOH	BRI	ROA	DAR	RCH	CHI	KEN	DOV	CLT	KAN	TEX	PHO	HOM	106th	0^{1}	

==== Camping World Truck Series ====
NASCAR Camping World Truck Series results
Year	Team	No.	Make	1	2	3	4	5	6	7	8	9	10	11	12	13	14	15	16	17	18	19	20	21	22	23	NCWTC	Pts	Ref
2015	MAKE Motorsports	1	Chevy	DAY	ATL	MAR	KAN	CLT; 20	DOV	TEX	GTW	IOW	KEN	ELD	POC	MCH	BRI	MSP	CHI	NHA	LVS	TAL	MAR	TEX	PHO	HOM	101st	0^{1}	

^{*} Season still in progress
^{1} not eligible for series points

==== Camping World East Series ====
NASCAR Camping World East Series results
Year	Team	No.	Make	1	2	3	4	5	6	7	8	9	10	11	NCWEC	Pts	Ref
2009	Ken Schrader Racing	52	Chevy	GRE	TRI; 13	IOW	SBO	GLN	NHA	TMP	ADI	LRP	NHA	DOV	53rd	124	

=== ARCA Racing Series ===
(key) (Bold – Pole position awarded by qualifying time. Italics – Pole position earned by points standings or practice time. * – Most laps led.)

ARCA Racing Series results
Year	Team	No.	Make	1	2	3	4	5	6	7	8	9	10	11	12	13	14	15	16	17	18	19	20	ARSC	Pts	Ref
2010	Eddie Sharp Racing	6	Toyota	DAY	PBE	SLM	TEX	TAL	TOL; 15	POC	MCH	IOW; 22	MFD	POC	BLN	NJE	ISF							35th	750	
2010	Ken Schrader Racing	52	Chevy															CHI; 12	DSF	TOL	SLM	KAN; 14	CAR; 17	35th	750	
2011	Venturini Motorsports	15	Chevy	DAY; 16	TAL; 36	SLM	TOL	NJE	CHI; 23	POC	MCH	WIN	BLN	IOW	IRP									44th	555	
2011	Venturini Motorsports	55	Chevy													POC; 24	ISF	MAD	DSF	SLM	KAN			44th	555	
2011	Venturini Motorsports	55	Toyota																			TOL; 27		44th	555	
