= Benny Gordon =

American stock car racing driver

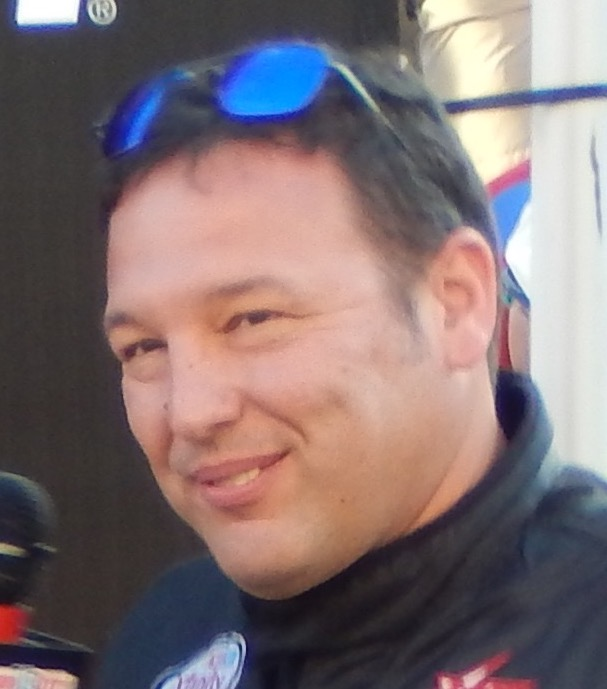
- Gordon at Bristol Motor Speedway in 2015
- Born: Benjamin Stark Gordon; November 29, 1970 (age 55); DuBois, Pennsylvania, U.S.
- Achievements: 2005, 2008 USAR Hooters Pro Cup Series Champion; 2004, 2006 USAR Hooters Pro Cup Series Northern Division Champion
- Awards: 2003 USAR Hooters Pro Cup Series Rookie of the Year

NASCAR O'Reilly Auto Parts Series career
- 27 races run over 6 years
- 2017 position: 70th
- Best finish: 34th (2012)
- First race: 2009 Nashville 300 (Nashville)
- Last race: 2017 PowerShares QQQ 300 (Daytona)
Wins	Top tens	Poles
0	1	0

NASCAR FedEx Freight Truck Series career
- 2 races run over 2 years
- 2008 position: 99th
- Best finish: 85th (2007)
- First race: 2007 Toyota Tundra Milwaukee 200 (Milwaukee)
- Last race: 2008 Ohio 250 (Mansfield)
Wins	Top tens	Poles
0	0	0
- Statistics up to date as of February 25, 2017.

Benjamin Stark Gordon (born November 29, 1970) is an American former professional stock car racing driver.

== Racing career ==
=== Early career ===
Prior to moving up to NASCAR's big leagues, Gordon competed in the NASCAR-sanctioned Slim Jim All Pro Series in the late 1990s and early 2000s. Good runs in the series allowed him to move up to the USAR Hooters Pro Cup Series, where he was Rookie of the Year in 2003. He went on to win the Northern Division in four of the following five seasons, except for 2007 where he finished second. He would add overall series championships in 2005 and 2008. His brother Todd would serve as his crew chief.

=== NASCAR ===
Gordon's first NASCAR national touring series race was in the Camping World Truck Series (then Craftsman Truck Series) in 2007 at the Milwaukee Mile, where he finished 15th. It was his only Truck Series start that season. He returned for one more Truck Series start the following year, finishing 31st at Mansfield Motorsports Park, a track where he has won multiple USAR races.

In 2009, Gordon left USARacing full-time to enter his own team in the Nationwide Series. Driving the No. 72 Ford Fusion, he has made six starts and finished in the top-20 twice, with a best finish of 12th at Iowa Speedway.

After making one start in the series in 2011, Gordon returned to the Nationwide Series in 2012, driving the No. 24 SR² Motorsports Toyota on a part-time basis. He finished 12th in the series' season-opening race at Daytona International Speedway; he filed to run for Rookie of the Year in the series shortly thereafter. However, without sponsorship, Gordon moved to the position of crew chief, hiring other sponsored drivers to drive the No. 24; for 2013, he was promoted to team manager and lead crew chief for the SR² team.

SR² Motorsports shut down after 2013, leaving Gordon without work. He made one attempt in the Nationwide Series in 2014, failing to qualify the TriStar Motorsports No. 91 car at Daytona in July. In 2015, Gordon entered the season without a ride, but with the closure of Vision Racing, Gordon bought the team's assets and rebranded the team as PEG Racing. Gordon finished 13th in his first attempt at Talladega. Gordon also finished in the top-five at the Subway Firecracker 250 at Daytona in the same year. It was Gordon's best finish since Daytona in 2012. It was also Gordon's first top-five and -ten finish. Gordon later made three races including Bristol, Richmond, and Chicagoland but the results were poor. In 2016, Gordon drove one race for TriStar Motorsports in the No. 14 Toyota Camry at Daytona, and finished 35th due to a transmission issue.

== Motorsports career results ==
=== NASCAR ===
(key) (Bold – Pole position awarded by qualifying time. Italics – Pole position earned by points standings or practice time. * – Most laps led.)

==== Xfinity Series ====
NASCAR Xfinity Series results
Year	Team	No.	Make	1	2	3	4	5	6	7	8	9	10	11	12	13	14	15	16	17	18	19	20	21	22	23	24	25	26	27	28	29	30	31	32	33	34	35	NXSC	Pts	Ref
2009	VSI Racing	72	Ford	DAY	CAL	LVS	BRI; DNQ	TEX	NSH; 36	PHO	TAL	RCH; 37	DAR	CLT	DOV	NSH	KEN; DNQ	MLW	NHA; 31	DAY	CHI	GTY	IRP	IOW; 12	GLN	MCH	BRI; 18	CGV	ATL	RCH; 30	DOV	KAN	CAL	CLT	MEM	TEX	PHO	HOM; DNQ	75th	436	
2011	Go Green Racing	04	Ford	DAY	PHO	LVS	BRI	CAL	TEX	TAL	NSH	RCH	DAR	DOV	IOW	CLT	CHI	MCH	ROA	DAY	KEN	NHA	NSH	IRP	IOW	GLN	CGV	BRI; 28	ATL	RCH	CHI	DOV	KAN	CLT	TEX	PHO	HOM		74th	16	
2012	SR² Motorsports	24	Toyota	DAY; 12																						BRI; 22	ATL; 24	RCH	CHI; 29	KEN; 32	DOV	CLT	KAN	TEX	PHO	HOM			34th	198	
2012	SR² Motorsports	24	Chevy		PHO; 27	LVS; 30	BRI; 24	CAL; 22	TEX; 33	RCH	TAL	DAR	IOW	CLT	DOV	MCH	ROA	KEN	DAY	NHA	CHI; 31	IND	IOW	GLN	CGV														34th	198	
2014	Martins Motorsports	67	Ford	DAY	PHO	LVS	BRI	CAL	TEX	DAR	RCH	TAL	IOW	CLT	DOV	MCH; QL^{†}	ROA	KEN																					NA	-	
2014	TriStar Motorsports	91	Toyota																DAY; DNQ	NHA	CHI	IND	IOW	GLN	MOH	BRI	ATL	RCH	CHI	KEN	DOV	KAN	CLT	TEX	PHO	HOM			NA	-	
2015	Vision Racing	17	Toyota	DAY	ATL	LVS	PHO	CAL	TEX	BRI	RCH	TAL; 13	IOW	CLT	DOV	MCH	CHI																						50th	60	
2015	PEG Racing	66	Toyota															DAY; 5	KEN	NHA	IND	IOW	GLN	MOH	BRI; 37	ROA	DAR	RCH; 38	CHI; 36	KEN	DOV	CLT	KAN	TEX	PHO	HOM			50th	60	
2016	TriStar Motorsports	14	Toyota	DAY; 35	ATL	LVS	PHO	CAL	TEX	BRI	RCH	TAL; 14	DOV	CLT	POC	MCH	IOW	DAY; 23	KEN	NHA	IND	IOW	GLN	MOH	BRI	ROA	DAR	RCH	CHI	KEN	DOV	CLT	KAN	TEX	PHO	HOM			47th	51	
2017	TriStar Motorsports	44	Toyota	DAY; 27	ATL	LVS	PHO	CAL	TEX	BRI	RCH	TAL	CLT	DOV	POC	MCH	IOW	DAY	KEN	NHA	IND	IOW	GLN	MOH	BRI	ROA	DAR	RCH	CHI	KEN	DOV	CLT	KAN	TEX	PHO	HOM			70th	10	
^{†} - Qualified for Tommy Joe Martins

==== Craftsman Truck Series ====
NASCAR Craftsman Truck Series results
Year	Team	No.	Make	1	2	3	4	5	6	7	8	9	10	11	12	13	14	15	16	17	18	19	20	21	22	23	24	25	NCTC	Pts	Ref
2007	Xpress Motorsports	16	Ford	DAY	CAL	ATL	MAR	KAN	CLT	MFD	DOV	TEX	MCH	MLW; 15	MEM	KEN	IRP	NSH	BRI	GTW	NHA	LVS	TAL	MAR	ATL	TEX	PHO	HOM	85th	118	
2008	North South Motorsports	66	Ford	DAY	CAL	ATL	MAR	KAN	CLT	MFD; 31	DOV	TEX	MCH	MLW	MEM	KEN	IRP	NSH	BRI	GTW	NHA	LVS	TAL	MAR	ATL	TEX	PHO	HOM	99th	70	

==== K&N Pro Series East ====
NASCAR K&N Pro Series East results
Year	Team	No.	Make	1	2	3	4	5	6	7	8	9	10	11	12	13	14	NKNPSEC	Pts	Ref
2011	VSI Racing	66	Chevy	GRE; 15	SBO; 26	RCH; 12	IOW; 16	BGS; 23	JFC; 10	LGY		COL; 23						18th	1217	
2011	VSI Racing	66	Toyota								NHA; 5			NHA; 35	DOV; 6			18th	1217	
2011	VSI Racing	66	Ford										GRE; 25					18th	1217	
2012	VSI Racing	66	Toyota	BRI	GRE	RCH	IOW	BGS	JFC	LGY	CNB; 9	COL	IOW	NHA	DOV	GRE	CAR	55th	35	

^{*} Season still in progress
^{1} Ineligible for series points

=== ARCA Racing Series ===
(key) (Bold – Pole position awarded by qualifying time. Italics – Pole position earned by points standings or practice time. * – Most laps led.)

ARCA Racing Series results
Year	Team	No.	Make	1	2	3	4	5	6	7	8	9	10	11	12	13	14	15	16	17	18	19	20	ARSC	Pts	Ref
2011	VSI Racing	09	Ford	DAY; 7	TAL	SLM	TOL	NJE	CHI	POC	MCH	WIN	BLN	IOW	IRP	POC	ISF	MAD	DSF	SLM	KAN	TOL		95th	195	
2014	Wes Gonder Racing	11	Ford	DAY; 34	MOB	SLM	TAL	TOL	NJE	POC	MCH	ELK	WIN	CHI	IRP	POC	BLN	ISF	MAD	DSF	SLM	KEN	KAN	145th	60	

Sporting positions
Preceded by Clay Rogers	USAR Hooters Pro Cup Series Champion; 2005	Succeeded by Clay Rogers
Preceded by Bobby Gill	USAR Hooters Pro Cup Series Champion; 2008	Succeeded by Clay Rogers
