= Madison Speedway =

Racetrack in Madison, Minnesota, U.S.

- Location: Madison, Minnesota
- Coordinates: 45.00523°N 96.19427°W
- Capacity: 2,000
- Operator: Lac qui Parle Racing Association
- Opened: 1979
- Major events: DRC Street Stock Tour, Structural Buildings Late Model Challenge Series

Clay Oval
- Length: 0.6 km (0.37 mi)

Madison Speedway is a 3/8, black gumbo clay oval racetrack located in Madison, Minnesota. It is situated south of town across the train tracks on U.S. Highway 75 (Eighth Avenue).

== Track information ==
The track currently runs on Saturday nights with WISSOTA sanctioning in five of their seven divisions. The track also runs a local division of Pure Stocks.

== Weekly program ==
Madison Speedway has a program complete with Madison Pure Stocks, WISSOTA Street Stocks, WISSOTA Midwest Modifieds, WISSOTA Super Stocks, WISSOTA Modifieds, Gen X Late Models, and WISSOTA Hornets.
