= Clint King =

American racing driver (born 1995)

- Born: August 26, 1995 (age 31); Denton, North Carolina, U.S.
- Achievements: 2019 Southeast Super Truck Series champion

NASCAR O'Reilly Auto Parts Series career
- 5 races run over 2 years
- 2017 position: 81st
- Best finish: 50th (2016)
- First race: 2016 Virginia 529 College Savings 250 (Richmond)
- Last race: 2017 Rinnai 250 (Atlanta)
Wins	Top tens	Poles
0	0	0
- Statistics up to date as of March 4, 2017.

Clint King (born August 26, 1995) is an American professional stock car racing driver. He has raced in the NASCAR Xfinity Series, ARCA Racing Series and K&N Pro Series East.

== Racing career ==
King grew up racing late models, scoring a victory in the UARA-Stars series at Kingsport Speedway. After running NASCAR, he competed in the Southeast Super Truck Series, winning the 2019 SSTS championship.

=== ARCA Racing Series ===
Debuting in the ARCA Racing Series in 2011, King won the pole for his first race with Venturini Motorsports. He finished third in that race, but won the pole in his second career start too. He started three races in 2011 with a best finish of third in his first race, at Madison International Speedway. King expanded his schedule to six races in 2012, not winning any poles but finishing out of the top ten only once. His only start in 2013 was a seventh at Berlin Raceway. On January 9, 2017, Lira Motorsports announced that King would drive the Lucas Oil Complete Engine Treatment 200 at Daytona International Speedway.

=== K&N Pro Series East ===
MacDonald Motorsports gave King his first ride in the K&N Pro Series East in 2013, where he finished sixteenth. In 2014, King ran four races for his family team with a best finish of eleventh.

=== Xfinity Series ===
King broke into the NASCAR Xfinity Series in 2016, driving the No. 15 Ford for B. J. McLeod Motorsports at Richmond International Raceway. King finished 30th that first race, but then improved to 26th in his other two outings, at Charlotte Motor Speedway and Texas Motor Speedway. After the 2016 season, team owner B. J. McLeod hinted at King running full-time in 2017 contingent on sponsorship. He is rumored to run the 2017 season opener at Daytona International Speedway. He ran the first two races of the season in the No. 78 Chevy, then McLeod went back to it since then several other drivers have been in the No. 78.

== Personal life ==
King is the manager of Warehouse Design who sponsored him in his career.

== Motorsports career results ==
=== NASCAR ===
(key) (Bold – Pole position awarded by qualifying time. Italics – Pole position earned by points standings or practice time. * – Most laps led.)

==== Xfinity Series ====
NASCAR Xfinity Series results
Year	Team	No.	Make	1	2	3	4	5	6	7	8	9	10	11	12	13	14	15	16	17	18	19	20	21	22	23	24	25	26	27	28	29	30	31	32	33	NXSC	Pts	Ref
2016	B. J. McLeod Motorsports	15	Ford	DAY	ATL	LVS	PHO	CAL	TEX	BRI	RCH	TAL	DOV	CLT	POC	MCH	IOW	DAY	KEN	NHA	IND	IOW	GLN	MOH	BRI	ROA	DAR	RCH; 30	CHI	KEN	DOV	CLT; 26	KAN	TEX; 26	PHO	HOM	50th	41	
2017	B. J. McLeod Motorsports	78	Chevy	DAY; 38	ATL; 35	LVS	PHO	CAL	TEX	BRI	RCH	TAL	CLT	DOV	POC	MCH	IOW	DAY	KEN	NHA	IND	IOW	GLN	MOH	BRI	ROA	DAR	RCH	CHI	KEN	DOV	CLT	KAN	TEX	PHO	HOM	81st	3	

==== K&N Pro Series East ====
NASCAR K&N Pro Series East results
Year	Team	No.	Make	1	2	3	4	5	6	7	8	9	10	11	12	13	14	15	16	NKNPSEC	Pts	Ref
2013	MacDonald Motorsports	49	Toyota	BRI	GRE	FIF	RCH	BGS; 16	IOW	LGY	COL	IOW	VIR	GRE	NHA	DOV	RAL			59th	28	
2014	David King	07	Chevy	NSM; 26	DAY; DNQ		GRE; 14													27th	108	
2014	David King	07	Toyota			BRI; 11		RCH; 34	IOW	BGS	FIF	LGY	NHA	COL	IOW	GLN	VIR	GRE	DOV	27th	108	

=== ARCA Racing Series ===
(key) (Bold – Pole position awarded by qualifying time. Italics – Pole position earned by points standings or practice time. * – Most laps led.)

ARCA Racing Series results
Year	Team	No.	Make	1	2	3	4	5	6	7	8	9	10	11	12	13	14	15	16	17	18	19	20	21	ARSC	Pts	Ref
2011	Venturini Motorsports	25	Chevy	DAY	TAL	SLM	TOL	NJE	CHI	POC	MCH	WIN	BLN	IOW	IRP	POC	ISF	**MAD**; 3	DSF	**SLM**; 21	KAN				42nd	575	
2011	Venturini Motorsports	15	Toyota																			TOL; 7			42nd	575	
2012	Venturini Motorsports	66	Chevy	DAY	MOB; 5	SLM; 6	TAL	TOL; 4	ELK	POC	MCH	WIN; 12	NJE	IOW	CHI	IRP	POC								26th	1200	
2012	Venturini Motorsports	15	Toyota															BLN; 6	ISF						26th	1200	
2012	Venturini Motorsports	15	Chevy																	MAD; 5	SLM	DSF	KAN		26th	1200	
2013	Venturini Motorsports	55	Toyota	DAY	MOB	SLM	TAL	TOL	ELK	POC	MCH	ROA	WIN	CHI	NJE	POC	BLN; 7	ISF	MAD	DSF	IOW	SLM	KEN	KAN	102nd	195	
2017	Lira Motorsports	58	Ford	DAY; 9	NSH	SLM	TAL	TOL	ELK	POC	MCH	MAD	IOW	IRP	POC	WIN	ISF	ROA	DSF	SLM	CHI	KEN	KAN		85th	185	

=== CARS Late Model Stock Car Tour ===
(key) (Bold – Pole position awarded by qualifying time. Italics – Pole position earned by points standings or practice time. * – Most laps led. ** – All laps led.)

CARS Late Model Stock Car Tour results
Year	Team	No.	Make	1	2	3	4	5	6	7	8	9	10	CLMSCTC	Pts	Ref
2015	Greg Marlowe	07	Chevy	SNM; 17	ROU; 11	HCY; 8	SNM; 12	TCM; 9	MMS	ROU	CON	MYB	HCY	21st	108	

=== CARS Pro Late Model Tour ===
(key)

CARS Pro Late Model Tour results
Year	Team	No.	Make	1	2	3	4	5	6	7	8	9	10	11	12	13	CPLMTC	Pts	Ref
2022	N/A	07	Chevy	CRW; 8	HCY	GPS	FCS	TCM	HCY	ACE	MMS; 17	TCM	ACE	SBO	CRW		27th	41	
2023	N/A	07	Chevy	SNM	HCY	ACE; 9	NWS; DNQ	TCM	DIL; 10	CRW	WKS	HCY					24th	74	
2023	N/A	6	Chevy										TCM; 8	SBO	TCM	CRW	24th	74	

^{*} Season still in progress
^{1} Ineligible for series points
