= Tim Andrews =

American racing driver and pit crew member

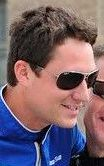
- Andrews in 2012
- Born: Timothy Jason Andrews; January 15, 1983 (age 43); Mooresville, North Carolina, U.S.

NASCAR O'Reilly Auto Parts Series career
- 46 races run over 5 years
- 2013 position: 78th
- Best finish: 32nd (2011)
- First race: 2009 Nashville 300 (Nashville)
- Last race: 2013 Aaron's 312 (Talladega)
| Wins | Top tens | Poles |
|---|---|---|
| 0 | 0 | 0 |

NASCAR FedEx Freight Truck Series career
- 7 races run over 3 years
- Best finish: 67th (2010)
- First race: 2009 EnjoyIllinois.com 225 (Chicago)
- Last race: 2011 WinStar World Casino 400K (Texas)
| Wins | Top tens | Poles |
|---|---|---|
| 0 | 0 | 0 |
- Statistics up to date as of May 17, 2020.

Timothy Jason Andrews (born January 15, 1983) is an American former professional stock car racing driver, engineer, and crew chief. He is the son of championship-winning NASCAR crew chief Paul Andrews.

== Racing career ==
=== Driving career ===
Andrews began his NASCAR racing career in the Busch North Series in 2002, finishing sixth at New Hampshire Motor Speedway. He ran for Rookie of the Year in the series in 2003, finishing fourth in the first race of the year, but lost his ride midway through the season due to loss of sponsorship.

Andrews ran a limited schedule in the Busch North Series, renamed the Busch East Series in 2006 and the Camping World East Series in 2008, from 2004 to 2008; he scored his first career win in the series at Dover Motor Speedway in September 2006 in the Sunoco 150, beating former Winston Cup Series driver Steve Park in a green–white–checkered finish for the victory. In 2007, Andrews made his debut in the ARCA Re/MAX Series at Nashville Superspeedway, running a limited schedule in the series that year.

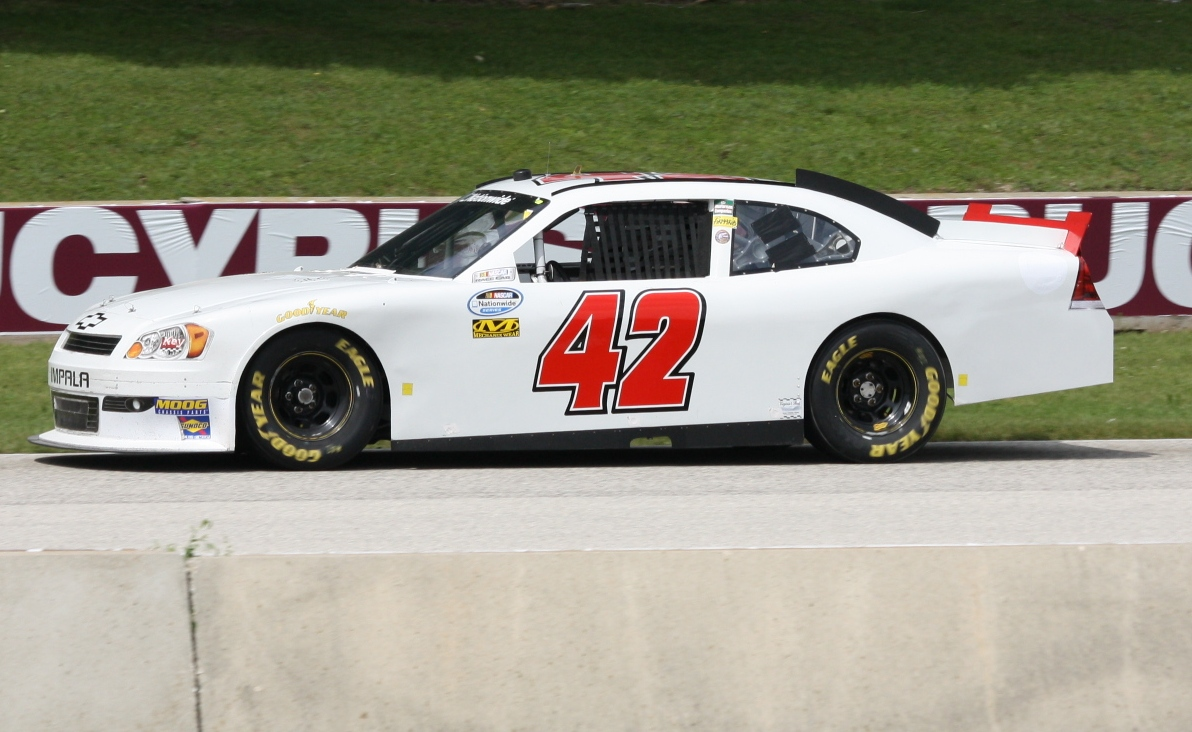
Andrews drove the Key Motorsports No. 42 at Road America in 2011.

Andrews moved up to NASCAR's national touring series in 2009, making his debut in the Nationwide Series at Nashville in the Nashville 300, finishing 33rd. He ran three further races during the 2009 season, and five in 2010, before attempting the majority of the 2011 Nationwide Series season. Andrews took over the 2nd Chance Motorsports No. 79 following the firing of previous driver Jennifer Jo Cobb; he was fired by the team after the STP 300 at Chicagoland Speedway in an incident in which the team's owner fired the entire team, with instructions to "find [their] own way back to Charlotte". He drove most of the remainder of the year for Key Motorsports.

Andrews joined Go Green Racing for three of the last four races of the 2011 Nationwide Series season; he returned to the team in 2012, with plans to run a limited schedule in the Nationwide Series (in association with Randy Hill Racing) and Sprint Cup Series. The team hired Paul Andrews as crew chief for its Sprint Cup Series team, making it the first father and son driver and crew chief combination in the series since 1987. The team planned to make its Cup Series debut at Bristol Motor Speedway in March, but delayed its first appearance on the track until the STP 400 at Kansas Speedway in late April.

=== Crew member career ===
In 2013, Andrews joined his father, Paul at Cunningham Motorsports as both a crew chief and driving instructor in the ARCA and K&N Series. This began with him crew chiefing Michel Disdier's No. 22 Dodge at the ARCA season-opener at Daytona. In 2014, he worked for TriStar Motorsports as the car chief for the No. 19 Toyota Camry in the Nationwide Series driven by Mike Bliss.

In 2016, Andrews became the crew chief for the upstart Contreras Motorsports team in the Truck Series, which fielded the No. 71 for driver-owners Carlos Contreras and Enrique Contreras III. However, a few races into the season, the Contreras team reduced their schedule from full-time to part-time, with other part-time teams in the series, particularly Ranier Racing with MDM, using their owner points and bringing in their own crew members and equipment for the No. 71. Various other crew chiefs replaced Andrews on the pit box for the team both when that occurred and in races where the Contreras' still fielded the truck.

== Motorsports career results ==
=== NASCAR ===
(key) (Bold – Pole position awarded by qualifying time. Italics – Pole position earned by points standings or practice time. * – Most laps led.)

==== Sprint Cup Series ====
NASCAR Sprint Cup Series results
| Year | Team | No. | Make | 1 | 2 | 3 | 4 | 5 | 6 | 7 | 8 | 9 | 10 | 11 | 12 | 13 | 14 | 15 | 16 | 17 | 18 | 19 | 20 | 21 | 22 | 23 | 24 | 25 | 26 | 27 | 28 | 29 | 30 | 31 | 32 | 33 | 34 | 35 | 36 | NSCC | Pts | Ref |
|---|---|---|---|---|---|---|---|---|---|---|---|---|---|---|---|---|---|---|---|---|---|---|---|---|---|---|---|---|---|---|---|---|---|---|---|---|---|---|---|---|---|---|
| 2012 | Go Green Racing | 79 | Ford | DAY | PHO | LVS | BRI | CAL | MAR | TEX | KAN; DNQ | RCH | TAL | DAR | CLT | DOV | POC | MCH | SON | KEN | DAY | NHA | IND | POC | GLN | MCH | BRI | ATL | RCH | CHI | NHA | DOV | TAL | CLT | KAN | MAR | TEX | PHO | HOM | 78th | 0^{1} | |

==== Nationwide Series ====
NASCAR Nationwide Series results
| Year | Team | No. | Make | 1 | 2 | 3 | 4 | 5 | 6 | 7 | 8 | 9 | 10 | 11 | 12 | 13 | 14 | 15 | 16 | 17 | 18 | 19 | 20 | 21 | 22 | 23 | 24 | 25 | 26 | 27 | 28 | 29 | 30 | 31 | 32 | 33 | 34 | 35 | NNSC | Pts | Ref |
|---|---|---|---|---|---|---|---|---|---|---|---|---|---|---|---|---|---|---|---|---|---|---|---|---|---|---|---|---|---|---|---|---|---|---|---|---|---|---|---|---|---|
| 2009 | Rick Ware Racing | 31 | Chevy | DAY | CAL | LVS | BRI | TEX | NSH; 33 | PHO | TAL | RCH | DAR | CLT | DOV | NSH | KEN | MLW | NHA | DAY | CHI | GTY | IRP | IOW | GLN | MCH | BRI | CGV | ATL | RCH | DOV; 31 | KAN | CAL | CLT; 26 | MEM | TEX | PHO | HOM; 30 | 85th | 292 | |
| 2010 | 2nd Chance Motorsports | 79 | Ford | DAY | CAL | LVS | BRI | NSH | PHO | TEX | TAL | RCH | DAR | DOV | CLT | NSH | KEN | ROA | NHA | DAY | CHI | GTY | IRP | IOW | GLN | MCH | BRI | CGV | ATL | RCH | DOV; 36 | KAN; 38 | CAL | CLT | GTY; 35 | TEX; 39 | PHO; 35 | HOM; DNQ | 88th | 266 | |
| 2011 | Rick Ware Racing | 68 | Ford | DAY | PHO | LVS; 41 | BRI | | | | | | | | | | | | | | | | | | | | | | | | | | | | | | | | 32nd | 146 | |
| 2011 | 2nd Chance Motorsports | 79 | Ford | | | | | CAL; 30 | TEX; 36 | TAL; 41 | NSH; 36 | RCH; 36 | DAR; 35 | DOV; 36 | | CLT; 38 | CHI; 34 | | | | | | | | | | | | | | | | | | | | | | 32nd | 146 | |
| 2011 | Key Motorsports | 46 | Chevy | | | | | | | | | | | | IOW; 39 | | | | | | | | | | | | | | | | | | | | | | | | 32nd | 146 | |
| 2011 | Key Motorsports | 42 | Chevy | | | | | | | | | | | | | | | MCH; 41 | ROA; 41 | DAY; Wth | KEN; 38 | NHA; 41 | NSH; 39 | | IOW; 41 | GLN; DNQ | CGV | BRI; 39 | ATL; 39 | RCH; 38 | CHI; DNQ | DOV; 40 | KAN; DNQ | | | | | | 32nd | 146 | |
| 2011 | Key Motorsports | 40 | Chevy | | | | | | | | | | | | | | | | | | | | | IRP; 31 | | | | | | | | | | | | | | | 32nd | 146 | |
| 2011 | Go Green Racing | 04 | Ford | | | | | | | | | | | | | | | | | | | | | | | | | | | | | | | CLT; 38 | TEX; 40 | PHO; 42 | HOM | | 32nd | 146 | |
| 2012 | Randy Hill Racing | 08 | Ford | DAY | PHO | LVS | BRI | CAL; 36 | TEX | RCH | TAL; 32 | DAR | IOW; 37 | CLT | DOV; 40 | MCH | ROA | KEN; 38 | DAY | NHA | CHI; 37 | IND | IOW | GLN | | BRI; 37 | ATL | RCH | CHI; 43 | KEN | | | | | | | | | 47th | 100 | |
| 2012 | Go Green Racing | 39 | Ford | | | | | | | | | | | | | | | | | | | | | | CGV; 17 | | | | | | DOV; 29 | CLT | KAN | TEX; 35 | PHO | HOM | | | 47th | 100 | |
| 2013 | KH Motorsports | 92 | Ford | DAY | PHO | LVS | BRI | CAL | TEX | RCH | TAL; 30 | DAR | CLT | DOV | IOW | MCH | ROA | KEN | DAY | NHA | CHI | IND | IOW | GLN | MOH | BRI | ATL | RCH | CHI | KEN | DOV | KAN | CLT | TEX | PHO | HOM | | | 78th | 14 | |

==== Camping World Truck Series ====
NASCAR Camping World Truck Series results
| Year | Team | No. | Make | 1 | 2 | 3 | 4 | 5 | 6 | 7 | 8 | 9 | 10 | 11 | 12 | 13 | 14 | 15 | 16 | 17 | 18 | 19 | 20 | 21 | 22 | 23 | 24 | 25 | NCWTC | Pts | Ref |
|---|---|---|---|---|---|---|---|---|---|---|---|---|---|---|---|---|---|---|---|---|---|---|---|---|---|---|---|---|---|---|---|
| 2009 | MB Motorsports | 63 | Ford | DAY | CAL | ATL | MAR | KAN | CLT | DOV | TEX | MCH | MLW | MEM | KEN | IRP | NSH | BRI | CHI; 25 | IOW | GTW | NHA | LVS | MAR | TAL | | | | 72nd | 176 | |
| 2009 | MB Motorsports | 36 | Ford | | | | | | | | | | | | | | | | | | | | | | | TEX; 25 | PHO | HOM | 72nd | 176 | |
| 2010 | Team Gill Racing | 95 | Dodge | DAY | ATL | MAR | NSH | KAN; DNQ | DOV; 31 | CLT | TEX | MCH | IOW | GTY | IRP | | | | | CHI; 36 | KEN; 36 | NHA | LVS | MAR | TAL | TEX | PHO | HOM | 67th | 286 | |
| 2010 | Team Gill Racing | 46 | Dodge | | | | | | | | | | | | | POC; 18 | NSH | DAR | BRI | | | | | | | | | | 67th | 286 | |
| 2011 | Tagsby Racing | 73 | Chevy | DAY | PHO | DAR | MAR | NSH | DOV | CLT | KAN | TEX; 21 | KEN | IOW | NSH | IRP | POC | MCH | BRI | ATL | CHI | NHA | KEN | LVS | TAL | MAR | | | 93rd | 0^{1} | |
| 2011 | Tagsby Racing | 65 | Chevy | | | | | | | | | | | | | | | | | | | | | | | | TEX; DNQ | HOM | 93rd | 0^{1} | |
| 2012 | Mike Harmon Racing | 74 | Chevy | DAY | MAR | CAR | KAN | CLT | DOV | TEX | KEN | IOW | CHI | POC | MCH | BRI | ATL | IOW | KEN; DNQ | LVS | TAL | MAR | TEX | PHO | HOM | | | | NA | 0^{1} | |

==== Camping World East Series ====
NASCAR Camping World East Series results
| Year | Team | No. | Make | 1 | 2 | 3 | 4 | 5 | 6 | 7 | 8 | 9 | 10 | 11 | 12 | 13 | 14 | 15 | 16 | 17 | 18 | 19 | NCWESC | Pts | Ref |
|---|---|---|---|---|---|---|---|---|---|---|---|---|---|---|---|---|---|---|---|---|---|---|---|---|---|
| 2002 | Marsh Racing | 31 | Chevy | LEE | NHA | NZH | SEE | BEE | STA | HOL | WFD | TMP | NHA; 6 | STA | GLN | ADI | THU | BEE | NHA | DOV | STA | LRP | 53rd | 150 | |
| 2003 | Melissa Masessa | 11 | Chevy | LEE; 4 | STA; 12 | ERI; 11 | BEE; 9 | STA; 17 | HOL; 5 | TMP; 19 | | | | | | | | | | | | | 24th | 1034 | |
| 2003 | Ray Penfold | 0 | Pontiac | | | | | | | | NHA; 19 | WFD | SEE | GLN | ADI | BEE | THU | NHA | STA | LRP | | | 24th | 1034 | |
| 2004 | Paul Andrews Racing | 9 | Chevy | LEE | TMP | LIM; 30 | SEE | STA | HOL; 5 | LER | WFD | NHA; 15 | ADI | GLN; 31 | NHA | DOV; 22 | | | | | | | 26th | 513 | |
| 2005 | Glynn Motorsports | 9 | Chevy | STA; 4 | HOL | ERI | NHA; 20 | WFD | ADI | STA | DUB | OXF | NHA | DOV; 5 | LRP | TMP | | | | | | | 41st | 263 | |
| 2006 | Paul Andrews Racing | 9 | Chevy | GRE | STA | HOL | TMP | ERI | NHA; 36 | ADI | WFD | NHA | DOV; 1* | LRP | | | | | | | | | 42nd | 236 | |
| 2007 | Paul Andrews Racing | 9 | Chevy | GRE | ELK | IOW | SBO | STA | NHA | TMP | NSH; 8 | ADI | LRP | MFD | NHA | DOV; 26 | | | | | | | 44th | 227 | |
| 2008 | Sadler Brothers Racing | 95 | Chevy | GRE | IOW | SBO | GLN | NHA | TMP | NSH | ADI | LRP | MFD | NHA | DOV; 25 | STA | | | | | | | 73rd | 88 | |

=== ARCA Racing Series ===
(key) (Bold – Pole position awarded by qualifying time. Italics – Pole position earned by points standings or practice time. * – Most laps led.)

ARCA Racing Series results
| Year | Team | No. | Make | 1 | 2 | 3 | 4 | 5 | 6 | 7 | 8 | 9 | 10 | 11 | 12 | 13 | 14 | 15 | 16 | 17 | 18 | 19 | 20 | 21 | 22 | 23 | ARSC | Pts | Ref |
|---|---|---|---|---|---|---|---|---|---|---|---|---|---|---|---|---|---|---|---|---|---|---|---|---|---|---|---|---|---|
| 2007 | Cunningham Motorsports | 4 | Dodge | DAY | USA | NSH; 6 | SLM | KAN | WIN | KEN | TOL | IOW | **POC**; 3 | MCH; 24 | BLN | | | | | | | | | | TAL; 31 | TOL | 44th | 740 | |
| 2007 | Cunningham Motorsports | 56 | Dodge | | | | | | | | | | | | | KEN; 24 | POC | NSH | ISF | MIL | GTW | DSF | CHI | SLM | | | 44th | 740 | |
| 2010 | Allgaier Motorsports | 63 | Chevy | DAY | PBE | SLM | TEX; 34 | TAL | TOL | POC | MCH | IOW | MFD | POC | BLN | NJE | ISF | CHI | DSF | TOL | SLM | KAN | CAR | | | | 130th | 60 | |
| 2012 | NDS Motorsports | 53 | Dodge | DAY | MOB | SLM | TAL | TOL | ELK | POC | MCH | WIN | NJE | IOW | CHI; 9 | IRP | POC | BLN | ISF | MAD | SLM | DSF; C | KAN | | | | 94th | 185 | |
