= Casey Roderick =

American racing driver (born 1992)

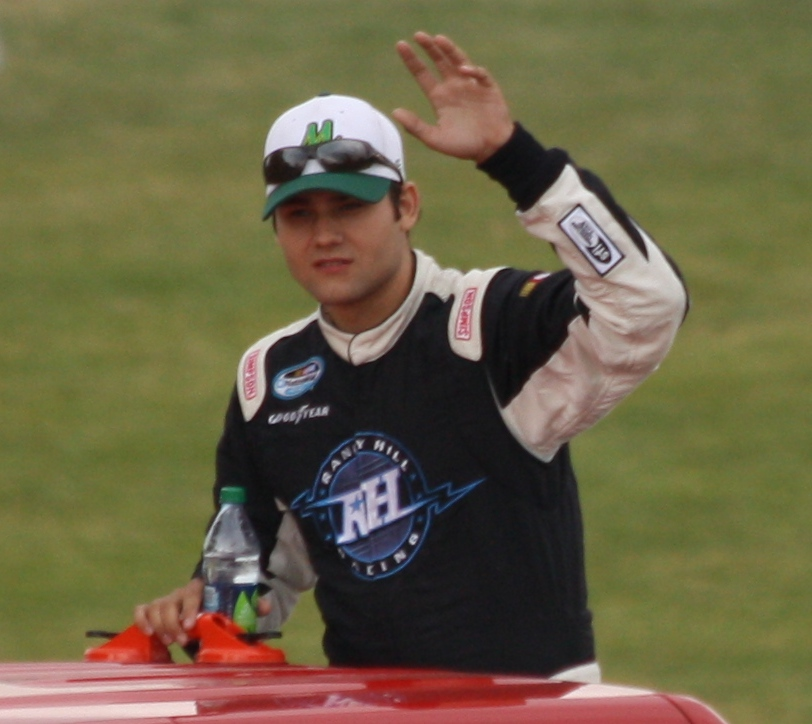
- Roderick at Road America in 2012
- Born: Casey Alan Roderick; August 8, 1992 (age 34); Lawrenceville, Georgia, U.S.
- Achievements: 2015, 2016, 2018 Blizzard Series Champion; 2016, 2017 Show Me The Money Pro Late Model Series Champion; 2018 Allen Turner Pro Late Model Series Champion; 2014 World Crown 300 Winner; 2014 Rattler 250 Winner; 2018, 2024 Alabama 200 Winner; 2020 All American 400 Winner; 2022 Snowflake 100 Winner; 2023 Red Eye 100 Winner; 2024 ASA STARS National Tour Champion
- Awards: 2018 Georgia Racing Hall of Fame Driver of the Year

NASCAR O'Reilly Auto Parts Series career
- 12 races run over 3 years
- 2018 position: 61st
- Best finish: 37th (2012)
- First race: 2011 Zippo 200 at the Glen (Watkins Glen)
- Last race: 2018 U.S. Cellular 250 (Iowa)
| Wins | Top tens | Poles |
|---|---|---|
| 0 | 0 | 0 |

NASCAR FedEx Freight Truck Series career
- 1 race run over 1 year
- 2011 position: 99th
- Best finish: 99th (2011)
- First race: 2011 VFW 200 (Michigan)
| Wins | Top tens | Poles |
|---|---|---|
| 0 | 0 | 0 |
- Statistics up to date as of July 28, 2022.

Casey Alan Roderick (born August 8, 1992) is an American professional stock car racing driver. He currently competes in the Southern Super Series competition across the south east and various short tracks all over the country.

== Racing career ==
A native of Lawrenceville, Georgia, Roderick began his racing career in Legends car racing, competing in the Atlanta Motor Speedway's Summer Shootout Series, scoring multiple wins despite inferior equipment. He moved up to late model racing in 2008, competing for Bill Elliott; he spent two years with Elliott's development-driver program, which included running a number of ARCA Racing Series events in a car jointly fielded by Elliott and Phoenix Racing, scoring a pole position at Palm Beach International Raceway, and a win in the series at New Jersey Motorsports Park in 2010; Roderick won the event despite starting 34th in the 35 car field; he was described as a "legitimate protege of...Elliott" by team co-owner Russ Sutton, and "the genuine article" by Elliott himself.

Despite the win, Roderick was released from the Elliott driver development program at the end of 2010 in favor of Elliott's son, Chase. He joined Randy Hill Racing in 2011, running four ARCA races before making his debut in the NASCAR Nationwide Series at Watkins Glen International in a car jointly fielded by RHR and Go Green Racing, and the Camping World Truck Series at Michigan International Speedway with RSS Racing.

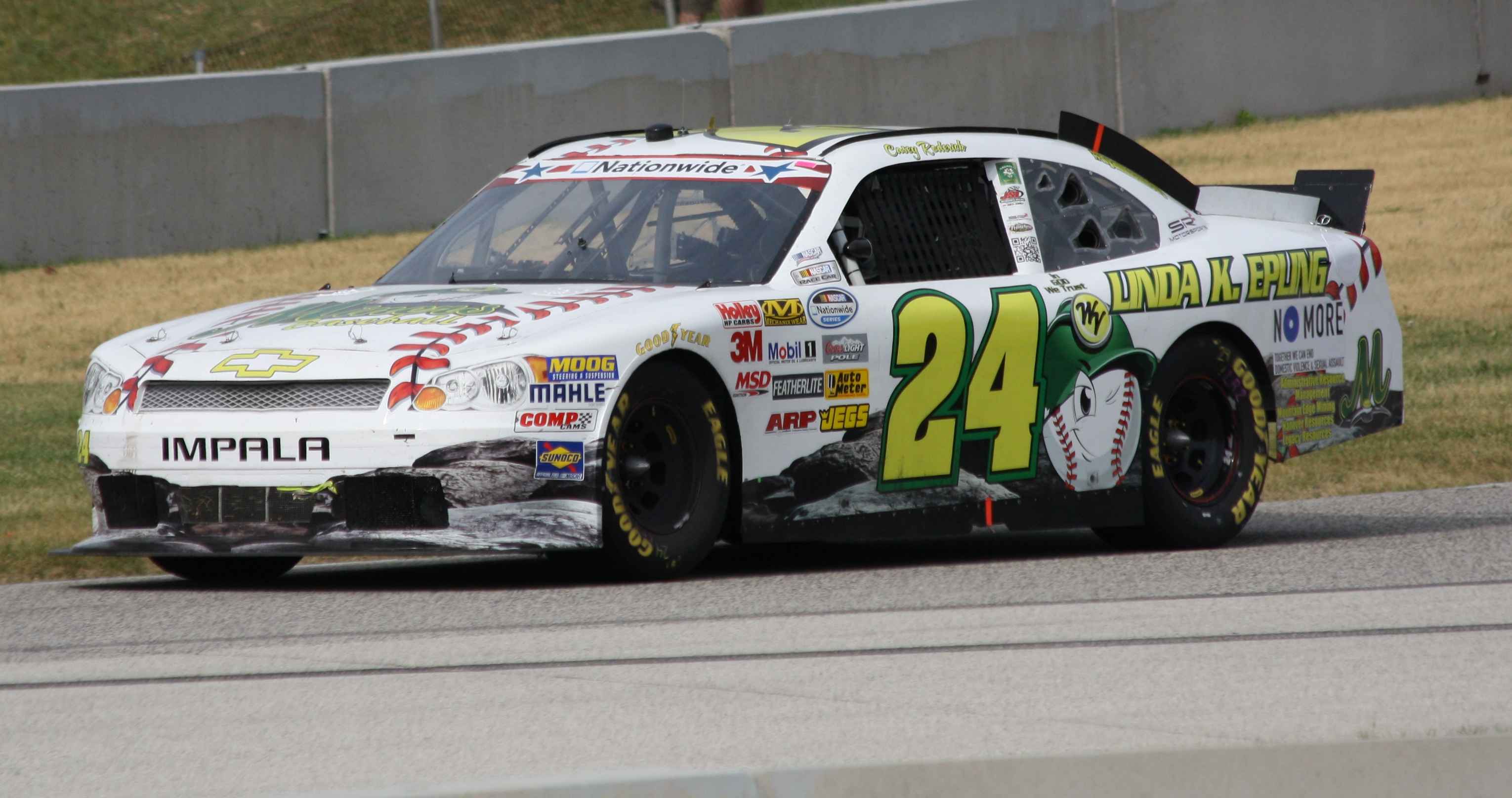
Roderick at Road America in 2012

Roderick started the 2012 season with Randy Hill Racing, driving the No. 08 in the Nationwide Series as a contender for the series' Rookie of the Year award; after two races however, a lack of sponsorship sidelined the team. He returned to competition at Richmond International Raceway in late April, sponsored by the West Virginia Miners baseball team, but was afterwards released by RHR. Joining SR² Motorsports with the Miners sponsorship, Roderick competed in the next three races, but once again faced sponsorship issues forcing the skipping of races after the May event at Charlotte Motor Speedway. He returned to the series and the No. 24 for the summer races at Road America and Daytona International Speedway.

Starting 2013 without a ride, in May Roderick returned to late model racing, competing in the Southern Super Series starting at Five Flags Speedway in May. Since joining Graham Motorsports in 2013, his accomplishments include winning the Rattler 250, World Crown 300, Blizzard Series in 2015 and 2016 and finishing third in the Southern Super Series in 2015. He won eight races driving for Ronnie Sanders in the red 18 in 2016, and won the pro late model championship at Montgomery Motor Speedway as well.

Roderick returned to the NASCAR Xfinity Series in 2018, driving the No. 23 Chevrolet Camaro for GMS Racing at Iowa, where he would finish 15th. His last start previously was at Daytona in 2012.

== Motorsports career results ==
=== Stock car career summary ===
| Season | Series | Team | Races | Wins | Top 5 | Top 10 | Points | Position |
|---|---|---|---|---|---|---|---|---|
| 2009 | ARCA Re/Max Series | Phoenix Racing | 1 | 0 | 1 | 1 | 480 | 63rd |
| 2010 | ARCA Racing Series | Phoenix Racing | 5 | 1 | 1 | 2 | 695 | 39th |
| 2011 | ARCA Racing Series | Phoenix Racing | 1 | 0 | 0 | 0 | 450 | 53rd |
| 2011 | ARCA Racing Series | Randy Hill Racing | 3 | 0 | 0 | 0 | 450 | 53rd |
| 2011 | NASCAR Camping World Truck Series | RSS Racing | 1 | 0 | 0 | 0 | 0 | NC† |
| 2011 | NASCAR Nationwide Series | Go Green Racing | 2 | 0 | 0 | 0 | 52 | 60th |
| 2011 | NASCAR Nationwide Series | Randy Hill Racing | 1 | 0 | 0 | 0 | 52 | 60th |
| 2012 | NASCAR Nationwide Series | Randy Hill Racing | 3 | 0 | 0 | 0 | 136 | 37th |
| 2012 | NASCAR Nationwide Series | SR² Motorsports | 5 | 0 | 0 | 0 | 136 | 37th |
| 2015 | CARS Super Late Model Tour | Danny Graham | 1 | 0 | 0 | 0 | 14 | 58th |
| 2017 | CARS Super Late Model Tour | Ronnie Sanders | 2 | 0 | 2 | 2 | 31 | 35th |
| 2018 | CARS Super Late Model Tour | Ronnie Sanders | 2 | 1 | 2 | 2 | 0 | N/A |
| 2018 | NASCAR Xfinity Series | GMS Racing | 1 | 0 | 0 | 0 | 22 | 61st |
| 2019 | CARS Super Late Model Tour | Ronnie Sanders | 2 | 0 | 1 | 1 | 0 | N/A |
| 2020 | CARS Super Late Model Tour | N/A | 1 | 1 | 1 | 1 | 0 | N/A |
| 2023 | ASA STARS National Tour | Anthony Campi Racing | 5 | 1 | 3 | 4 | 342 | 8th |
| 2024 | ASA STARS National Tour | Anthony Campi Racing | 10 | 1 | 8 | 9 | 743 | **1st** |
| 2024 | CARS Pro Late Model Tour | Ty King Motorsports | 1 | 0 | 0 | 0 | 0 | N/A |
| 2025 | ASA STARS National Tour | Rette Jones Racing | 1 | 0 | 0 | 0 | 42 | 53rd |
| 2025 | CARS Pro Late Model Tour | Ty King Motorsports | 2 | 0 | 1 | 1 | 59 | 33rd |
| 2026 | IHRA Pro Late Model Series | Ty King Motorsports | 2 | 1 | 2 | 2 | 0 | N/A |
| 2026 | ASA STARS National Tour | Rette Jones Racing | 8 | 0 | 1 | 4 | | |
| 2026 | ASA STARS National Tour | Ty King Motorsports | 1 | 0 | 0 | 0 | | |

=== NASCAR ===
(key) (Bold – Pole position awarded by qualifying time. Italics – Pole position earned by points standings or practice time. * – Most laps led.)

==== Xfinity Series ====
NASCAR Xfinity Series results
| Year | Team | No. | Make | 1 | 2 | 3 | 4 | 5 | 6 | 7 | 8 | 9 | 10 | 11 | 12 | 13 | 14 | 15 | 16 | 17 | 18 | 19 | 20 | 21 | 22 | 23 | 24 | 25 | 26 | 27 | 28 | 29 | 30 | 31 | 32 | 33 | 34 | NXSC | Pts | Ref |
|---|---|---|---|---|---|---|---|---|---|---|---|---|---|---|---|---|---|---|---|---|---|---|---|---|---|---|---|---|---|---|---|---|---|---|---|---|---|---|---|---|
| 2011 | Go Green Racing | 39 | Ford | DAY | PHO | LVS | BRI | CAL | TEX | TAL | NSH | RCH | DAR | DOV | IOW | CLT | CHI | MCH | ROA | DAY | KEN | NHA | NSH | IRP | IOW | GLN; 25 | CGV | BRI | ATL | | | | | | | | | 60th | 52 | |
| 2011 | Randy Hill Racing | 08 | Ford | | | | | | | | | | | | | | | | | | | | | | | | | | | RCH; DNQ | CHI | | | CLT; DNQ | TEX | PHO | | 60th | 52 | |
| 2011 | Randy Hill Racing | 70 | Chevy | | | | | | | | | | | | | | | | | | | | | | | | | | | | | DOV; 28 | KAN | | | | | 60th | 52 | |
| 2011 | Go Green Racing | 04 | Ford | | | | | | | | | | | | | | | | | | | | | | | | | | | | | | | | | | HOM; 27 | 60th | 52 | |
| 2012 | Randy Hill Racing | 08 | Ford | DAY; 36 | PHO; 17 | LVS | BRI | CAL | TEX | RCH; 23 | TAL | | | | | | | | | | | | | | | | | | | | | | | | | | | 37th | 136 | |
| 2012 | SR² Motorsports | 24 | Chevy | | | | | | | | | DAR; 40 | IOW; 20 | CLT; 21 | DOV | MCH | ROA; 32 | KEN | | | | | | | | | | | | | | | | | | | | 37th | 136 | |
| 2012 | SR² Motorsports | 24 | Toyota | | | | | | | | | | | | | | | | DAY; 27 | NHA | CHI | IND | IOW | GLN | CGV | BRI | ATL | RCH | CHI | KEN | DOV | CLT | KAN | TEX | PHO | HOM | | 37th | 136 | |
| 2018 | GMS Racing | 23 | Chevy | DAY | ATL | LVS | PHO | CAL | TEX | BRI | RCH | TAL | DOV | CLT | POC | MCH | IOW | CHI | DAY | KEN | NHA | IOW; 15 | GLN | MOH | BRI | ROA | DAR | IND | LVS | RCH | CLT | DOV | KAN | TEX | PHO | HOM | | 61st | 22 | |

==== Camping World Truck Series ====
NASCAR Camping World Truck Series results
| Year | Team | No. | Make | 1 | 2 | 3 | 4 | 5 | 6 | 7 | 8 | 9 | 10 | 11 | 12 | 13 | 14 | 15 | 16 | 17 | 18 | 19 | 20 | 21 | 22 | 23 | 24 | 25 | NCWTC | Pts | Ref |
|---|---|---|---|---|---|---|---|---|---|---|---|---|---|---|---|---|---|---|---|---|---|---|---|---|---|---|---|---|---|---|---|
| 2011 | RSS Racing | 93 | Chevy | DAY | PHO | DAR | MAR | NSH | DOV | CLT | KAN | TEX | KEN | IOW | NSH | IRP | POC | MCH; 29 | BRI | ATL | CHI | NHA | KEN | LVS | TAL | MAR | TEX | HOM | 99th | 0^{1} | |

* Season still in progress
^{1} not eligible for series points

=== ARCA Racing Series ===
(key) (Bold – Pole position awarded by qualifying time. Italics – Pole position earned by points standings or practice time. * – Most laps led.)

ARCA Racing Series results
| Year | Team | No. | Make | 1 | 2 | 3 | 4 | 5 | 6 | 7 | 8 | 9 | 10 | 11 | 12 | 13 | 14 | 15 | 16 | 17 | 18 | 19 | 20 | 21 | ARSC | Pts | Ref |
|---|---|---|---|---|---|---|---|---|---|---|---|---|---|---|---|---|---|---|---|---|---|---|---|---|---|---|---|
| 2009 | Phoenix Racing | 51 | Dodge | DAY | SLM | CAR | TAL | KEN | TOL | POC | MCH | MFD | IOW | KEN | BLN | POC | ISF | CHI | TOL | DSF | NJE | SLM | KAN | CAR; 2 | 63rd | 480 | |
| 2010 | Phoenix Racing | 51 | Dodge | DAY | **PBE**; 21 | SLM | TEX | TAL | TOL | POC | MCH | IOW; 7 | MFD | POC | BLN | NJE; 1 | ISF | | | | | KAN; 36 | CAR | | 39th | 695 | |
| 2010 | Phoenix Racing | 51 | Chevy | | | | | | | | | | | | | | | CHI; 32 | DSF | TOL | SLM | | | | 39th | 695 | |
| 2011 | Phoenix Racing | 51 | Chevy | DAY | TAL | SLM | TOL | NJE | CHI | POC | MCH; 21 | WIN | BLN | | | | | | | | | | | | 53rd | 450 | |
| 2011 | Randy Hill Racing | 08 | Chevy | | | | | | | | | | | IOW; 13 | IRP; 31 | | | | | | | | | | 53rd | 450 | |
| 2011 | Randy Hill Racing | 08 | Ford | | | | | | | | | | | | | POC; 30 | ISF | MAD | DSF | SLM | KAN | TOL | | | 53rd | 450 | |

=== CARS Super Late Model Tour ===
(key)

CARS Super Late Model Tour results
| Year | Team | No. | Make | 1 | 2 | 3 | 4 | 5 | 6 | 7 | 8 | 9 | 10 | 11 | 12 | 13 | CSLMTC | Pts | Ref |
|---|---|---|---|---|---|---|---|---|---|---|---|---|---|---|---|---|---|---|---|
| 2015 | Danny Graham | 7R | Ford | SNM | ROU | HCY; 19 | SNM | TCM | MMS | ROU | CON | MYB | HCY | | | | 58th | 14 | |
| 2017 | Ronnie Sanders | 18 | Ford | CON | DOM | DOM | HCY | HCY | BRI | AND; 3 | ROU; 2 | TCM | ROU | HCY | CON | SBO | 35th | 31 | |
| 2018 | Ronnie Sanders | 18 | Ford | MYB | NSH; 1 | ROU | HCY | BRI | AND; 2 | HCY | ROU | SBO | | | | | N/A | 0 | |
| 2019 | Ronnie Sanders | 18 | Ford | SNM | HCY | NSH; 11 | MMS | BRI; 2* | HCY | ROU | SBO | | | | | | N/A | 0 | |
| 2020 | N/A | 25R | Toyota | SNM | HCY | JEN | HCY | FCS | BRI | FLC | NSH; 1 | | | | | | N/A | 0 | |

=== CARS Pro Late Model Tour ===
(key)

CARS Pro Late Model Tour results
| Year | Team | No. | Make | 1 | 2 | 3 | 4 | 5 | 6 | 7 | 8 | 9 | 10 | 11 | 12 | 13 | CPLMTC | Pts | Ref |
|---|---|---|---|---|---|---|---|---|---|---|---|---|---|---|---|---|---|---|---|
| 2024 | Ty King | 62 | N/A | SNM | HCY | OCS | ACE | TCM | CRW | HCY | NWS; 18 | ACE | FLC | SBO | TCM | NWS | N/A | 0 | |
| 2025 | Ty King | 62R | N/A | AAS | CDL; 20 | OCS | ACE | NWS | CRW | HCY | | | | | | | 33rd | 59 | |
| 2025 | Ty King | 62 | N/A | | | | | | | | HCY; 5 | AND | FLC | SBO | TCM | NWS | 33rd | 59 | |

=== IHRA Pro Late Model Series ===
(key) (Bold – Pole position awarded by qualifying time. Italics – Pole position earned by points standings or practice time. * – Most laps led. ** – All laps led.)

IHRA Pro Late Model Series
| Year | Team | No. | Make | 1 | 2 | 3 | ISCSS | Pts | Ref |
|---|---|---|---|---|---|---|---|---|---|
| 2026 | Ty King Motorsports | 62 | Toyota | DUB | **CDL**; 1* | AND; 3 | N/A | 0 | |

=== ASA STARS National Tour ===
(key) (Bold – Pole position awarded by qualifying time. Italics – Pole position earned by points standings or practice time. * – Most laps led. ** – All laps led.)

ASA STARS National Tour results
| Year | Team | No. | Make | 1 | 2 | 3 | 4 | 5 | 6 | 7 | 8 | 9 | 10 | 11 | 12 | ASNTC | Pts | Ref |
|---|---|---|---|---|---|---|---|---|---|---|---|---|---|---|---|---|---|---|
| 2023 | Anthony Campi Racing | 18C | Chevy | FIF; 1 | | | | | | | | | | | | 8th | 342 | |
| 2023 | Anthony Campi Racing | 18R | Chevy | | MAD; 4 | | HCY; 12 | | | | | | | | | 8th | 342 | |
| 2023 | Anthony Campi Racing | 18 | Chevy | | | NWS; 7 | | MLW; 3 | AND | WIR | TOL | WIN | NSV | | | 8th | 342 | |
| 2024 | Anthony Campi Racing | 26R | Chevy | NSM; 3 | FIF; 11 | HCY; 2 | MAD; 2 | | AND; 6 | | | | **NSV**; 2 | | | 1st | 743 | |
| 2024 | Anthony Campi Racing | 26 | Chevy | | | | | MLW; 3 | | **OWO**; 5 | **TOL**; 1* | **WIN**; 5 | | | | 1st | 743 | |
| 2025 | Rette Jones Racing | 30R | Ford | NSM | FIF | DOM | HCY | NPS | MAD | SLG | AND | OWO | TOL | WIN | NSV; 12 | 53rd | 42 | |
| 2026 | Rette Jones Racing | 30 | Ford | NSM; 26 | FIF; 6 | HCY; 21 | SLG; 13 | MAD; 11 | NPS; 6 | OWO; 8 | TRI; 4 | WIN; Wth | | | | -* | -* | |
| 2026 | Ty King Motorsports | 62 | N/A | | | | | | | | | | NSV; 13 | NSM | | -* | -* | |
