= Second Chance Motorsports =

Second Chance Motorsports may refer to either of two motorsports teams:

- 2nd Chance Motorsports
- Chance 2 Motorsports
