= Chris Lawson (NASCAR) =

American racing driver

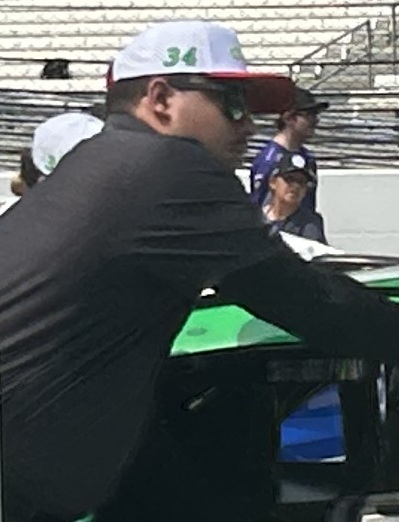
- Lawson at Indianapolis Motor Speedway in 2026
- Born: Christopher W. Lawson; November 6, 1985 (age 41) Medway, Ohio, U.S.

ARCA Racing Series career
- Debut season: 2011
- Former teams: Fast Track Racing
- Starts: 1
- Wins: 0
- Poles: 0
- Best finish: 132nd in 2011
- Finished last season: 132nd (2011)

NASCAR O'Reilly Auto Parts Series career
- 4 races run over 4 years
- 2011 position: 88th
- Best finish: 88th (2011)
- First race: 2009 Kroger 200 (IRP)
- Last race: 2011 Scotts EZ Seed 300 (Bristol)
Wins	Top tens	Poles
0	0	0

NASCAR FedEx Freight Truck Series career
- 1 race run over 1 year
- 2009 position: 89th
- Best finish: 89th (2009)
- First race: 2009 Heluva Good! 200 (New Hampshire)
Wins	Top tens	Poles
0	0	0
- Statistics up to date as of December 30, 2024.

Christopher W. Lawson (born November 6, 1985) is an American professional stock car racing crew chief who works for Front Row Motorsports as the crew chief of their No. 34 Ford Mustang Dark Horse in the NASCAR Cup Series driven by Todd Gilliland. He previously worked with Gilliland in the NASCAR West Series for Bill McAnally Racing, where the duo won two consecutive championships in 2016 and 2017 and twelve races together, as well as in the Truck Series for FRM. He is the 2022 Truck Series championship-winning crew chief with driver Zane Smith at FRM. Prior to becoming a crew chief, Lawson was a driver for underfunded, start and park teams in NASCAR and ARCA until 2011.

== Racing career ==
=== Driving career ===
Lawson gained notoriety in 2011 as the driver who replaced Jennifer Jo Cobb at Bristol Motor Speedway in the 2nd Chance Motorsports No. 79 entry after Cobb left the team on the day of the race after a dispute with team owner Rick Russell on being told to start and park in that race. Rookie of the year contender Charles Lewandoski was initially set to be the team's substitute driver, but was unable to get prepared in the car in time for the start of the race, so Russell then got Lawson to jump in Cobb's car and start and park it. Lawson had failed to qualify for the Bristol race in another start and park entry, the No. 03 for R3 Motorsports. He was the only DNQ for the race, and was still at the track when it was about to start. This race would end up being Lawson's last as a driver.

=== Crew chiefing career ===
In 2019, Lawson served as Tanner Gray's crew chief in the ARCA Menards Series for DGR-Crosley.

On December 14, 2023, FRM announced that Lawson would not continue as crew chief of the No. 38 truck in 2024 with new driver Layne Riggs and would take a step back to become a consultant as he would pursue other projects outside of NASCAR. However, the consultant work and side projects did not end up happening as Lawson would sign with Rick Ware Racing on January 16 to be the crew chief of their No. 51 car driven by Justin Haley in the NASCAR Cup Series for the 2024 season.

On December 12, 2024, Front Row Motorsports announced that Lawson would be returning to their team in 2025 as the crew chief of the No. 34 car in the Cup Series where he would reunite with Todd Gilliland.

== Motorsports career results ==
=== NASCAR ===
(key) (Bold – Pole position awarded by qualifying time. Italics – Pole position earned by points standings or practice time. * – Most laps led.)

==== Nationwide Series ====
NASCAR Nationwide Series results
Year	Team	No.	Make	1	2	3	4	5	6	7	8	9	10	11	12	13	14	15	16	17	18	19	20	21	22	23	24	25	26	27	28	29	30	31	32	33	34	35	NNSC	Pts	Ref
2007	Jimmy Means Racing	52	Ford	DAY	CAL	MXC	LVS	ATL	BRI	NSH	TEX	PHO	TAL	RCH	DAR	CLT	DOV	NSH	KEN	MLW	NHA	DAY	CHI	GTY	IRP	CGV	GLN	MCH	BRI	CAL	RCH	DOV	KAN	CLT	MEM; DNQ	TEX	PHO	HOM	N/A	0	
2009	Jimmy Means Racing	52	Chevy	DAY	CAL	LVS	BRI	TEX	NSH	PHO	TAL	RCH	DAR	CLT	DOV	NSH	KEN	MLW	NHA	DAY	CHI	GTY	IRP; 36	IOW	GLN	MCH	BRI	CGV	ATL	RCH; DNQ	DOV	KAN	CAL	CLT	MEM	TEX	PHO; DNQ	HOM	141st	55	
2010	Jimmy Means Racing	52	Ford	DAY	CAL	LVS	BRI; DNQ	NSH	PHO	TEX	TAL	RCH	DAR	DOV	CLT																								122nd	83	
2010	Jimmy Means Racing	52	Chevy													NSH; 40	KEN	ROA	NHA; DNQ	DAY	CHI	GTY; DNQ	IRP; 41	IOW	GLN	MCH	BRI; DNQ	CGV	ATL	RCH	DOV	KAN	CAL	CLT	GTY	TEX	PHO	HOM	122nd	83	
2011	R3 Motorsports	03	Dodge	DAY	PHO	LVS	BRI; DNQ																																88th	3	
2011	2nd Chance Motorsports	79	Ford				BRI; 41	CAL	TEX	TAL	NSH	RCH	DAR	DOV	IOW	CLT	CHI	MCH	ROA	DAY	KEN	NHA	NSH	IRP	IOW	GLN	CGV	BRI	ATL	RCH	CHI	DOV	KAN	CLT	TEX	PHO	HOM		88th	3	

==== Camping World Truck Series ====
NASCAR Camping World Truck Series results
Year	Team	No.	Make	1	2	3	4	5	6	7	8	9	10	11	12	13	14	15	16	17	18	19	20	21	22	23	24	25	NCWTC	Pts	Ref
2009	Fast Track Racing Enterprises	47	Chevy	DAY	CAL	ATL	MAR	KAN	CLT	DOV	TEX	MCH	MLW	MEM	KEN	IRP	NSH	BRI	CHI	IOW	GTW	NHA; 33	LVS	MAR	TAL	TEX	PHO	HOM	106th	64	

=== ARCA Racing Series ===
(key) (Bold – Pole position awarded by qualifying time. Italics – Pole position earned by points standings or practice time. * – Most laps led.)

ARCA Racing Series results
Year	Team	No.	Make	1	2	3	4	5	6	7	8	9	10	11	12	13	14	15	16	17	18	19	ARSC	Pts	Ref
2011	Fast Track Racing	18	Dodge	DAY; 22	TAL	SLM	TOL	NJE	CHI	POC	MCH	WIN	BLN	IOW	IRP	POC	ISF	MAD	DSF	SLM	KAN	TOL	132nd	120	
