= 2nd Chance Motorsports =

Former NASCAR team

- Owner: Rick Russell
- Series: Nationwide Series
- Race drivers: 79. Chris Lawson; Jennifer Jo Cobb; Tim Andrews
- Manufacturer: Ford Motor Company
- Opened: 2010 NASCAR Nationwide Series
- Closed: 2011 NASCAR Nationwide Series

Career
- Debut: 2010 Dover 200 (Dover)
- Latest race: 2011 STP 300 (Chicagoland)
- Races competed: 17
- Drivers' Championships: 0
- Race victories: 0
- Pole positions: 0

2nd Chance Motorsports was a NASCAR team owned by Rick Russell. It ran the No. 79 Ford Mustang in the Nationwide Series.

== History ==
The team's brief history started when Rick Russell formed his race team in the month of September. After a failed partnership with Specialty Racing, Russell formed his own team. Tim Andrews debuted the team's No. 79 at the fall Dover race with his father Paul Andrews as crew chief. The team made the final five races of the season, but started and parked all of them. Tim moved to Fleur-de-lis Motorsports, and Jennifer Jo Cobb agreed to run the first five races of 2011. However, due to a disagreement between Cobb and Russell over to start and park the 79 at Bristol, and a contract dispute, she and most of the team left 10 minutes before the start of the race and the driver was replaced by Chris Lawson. Russell then hired driver Tim Andrews. After crew chief Kevin Eagle told Russell that he would leave the team after Chicagoland, Russell fired the entire team and did not allow them to collect their belongings until police stepped in. Quote from Tim Andrews, "After the team and I loaded the hauler after the weekend [owner Rick Russell] fired us all and told us to find our own way home". Andrews then moved to Key Motorsports and Russell has not been involved in the sport since.

=== Car No. 79 results ===
Year	Driver	No.	Make	1	2	3	4	5	6	7	8	9	10	11	12	13	14	15	16	17	18	19	20	21	22	23	24	25	26	27	28	29	30	31	32	33	34	35	Owners	Pts
2010	Tim Andrews	79	Ford	DAY	CAL	LVS	BRI	NSH	PHO	TEX	TAL	RCH	DAR	DOV	CLT	NSH	KEN	ROA	NHA	DAY	CHI	GTY	IRP	IOW	GLN	MCH	BRI	CGV	ATL	RCH	DOV; 36	KAN; 38	CAL	CLT	GTY; 35	TEX; 39	PHO; 35	HOM; DNQ	55th	291
2011	Jennifer Jo Cobb	79	Ford	DAY; DNQ	PHO; 32	LVS; 31	BRI; QL																																45th	102
2011	Chris Lawson	79	Ford				BRI; 41																																45th	102
2011	Tim Andrews	79	Ford					CAL; 30	TEX; 36	TAL; 41	NSH; 36	RCH; 36	DAR; 35	DOV; 36	IOW	CLT; 38	CHI; 34	MCH	ROA	DAY	KEN	NHA	NSH	IRP	IOW	GLN	CGV	BRI	ATL	RCH	CHI	DOV	KAN	CLT	TEX	PHO	HOM		45th	102
