= Paul Andrews (NASCAR) =

American NASCAR crew chief

Paul R. Andrews (born May 25, 1957) is an American crew chief known for his work in the NASCAR Cup Series. He was the crew chief for Bobby Labonte's No. 43 team for Petty Enterprises until August 2007. He was the crew chief for Alan Kulwicki's 1992 NASCAR Winston Cup Series championship. He had 12 victories and 30 pole positions in his career as a NASCAR Cup crew chief.

== Biography ==
Andrews was born in Bangor, Maine. His parents divorced when he was 12 months old. He was raised by his mother's parents in Pineville, Louisiana. They moved to Monroe, Louisiana, when he was ten years old. After he graduated from high school in Monroe, he decided to live with his mother in St. Louis. They did not get along very well. He said, "I was young and set in my ways and thought I knew everything like every child does." He worked for his stepfather as a maintenance man at the motel that his stepfather managed. Andrews needed parts to repair a broken vacuum cleaner, so he went to the O.K. Vacuum repair shop co-owned by Rusty Wallace's father and uncle. Gary Wallace, Rusty's uncle, had a conversation with Andrews about vacuum cleaners and other topics. Gary Wallace offered Andrews a job. Andrews helped move the vacuum cleaner repair shop to a larger facility. Andrews worked closely with Rusty Wallace and the two got to know each other well. After work, he helped fix Wallace's USAC stock car, starting in 1979. He moved with Wallace to the ASA in 1983 when the team won the championship. Wallace moved from USAC to NASCAR in 1984, and Andrews moved to Louisiana to run Wallace's Sportsman for his driver Nicki Fraisson. Andrews quit in 1986.

Independent NASCAR driver Alan Kulwicki was talking with his friend Wallace at the 1986 NASCAR Awards banquet and he asked Wallace for some advice on whom to hire as his new crew chief. Rusty suggested Andrews. Andrews was ready to return to racing. He moved to NASCAR in 1988 as Kulwicki's crew chief, and he remained Kulwicki's crew chief until Kulwicki died in an airplane crash on April 1, 1993. Andrews was scheduled to be on the airplane, but remained with the pit crew to work on improving pit stop times. He remained with the team after it was purchased by Geoffrey Bodine. Hooters wanted the team to hire driver Loy Allen, Jr. and sell the team to Allen's father.

In 1999, Andrews joined Dale Earnhardt, Inc. with driver Steve Park Earning the #1 Chevrolet team two wins. He was named Labonte's crew chief in 2006.

Andrews was seriously injured in a fall in his shop on August 15, 2007, several days after he was released as Labonte's crew chief. He fell approximately 30 feet off a ladder while changing a light bulb. He was airlifted to Carolinas Medical Center. Andrews suffered a compression fracture of his spine, a crushed left ankle and some broken bones in his right ankle.

Andrews was hired by Michael Waltrip Racing to be Waltrip's crew chief for the 2008 season.

== Personal life ==
His son Tim Andrews was a developmental driver for Petty Enterprises. He would race in NASCAR's three national series.
