= Jennifer Jo Cobb =

American racing driver (born 1973)

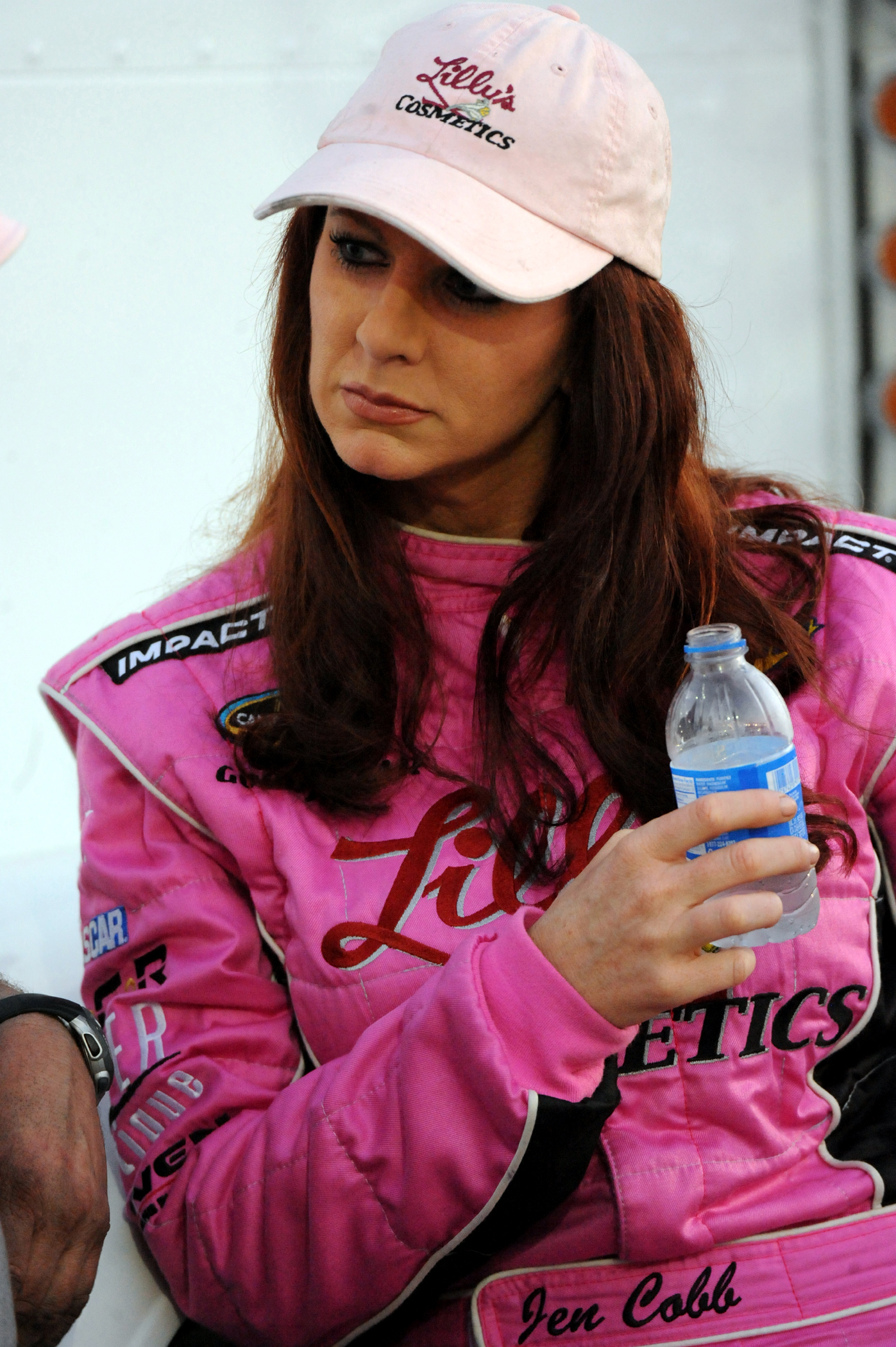
- Cobb in 2011
- Born: June 12, 1973 (age 53); Kansas City, Kansas, U.S.

NASCAR O'Reilly Auto Parts Series career
- 31 races run over 12 years
- 2018 position: 107th
- Best finish: 29th (2011)
- First race: 2004 Ford 300 (Homestead)
- Last race: 2018 Sparks Energy 300 (Talladega)
Wins	Top tens	Poles
0	0	0

NASCAR FedEx Freight Truck Series career
- 234 races run over 17 years
- 2024 position: 64th
- Best finish: 16th (2014)
- First race: 2008 O'Reilly Auto Parts 250 (Kansas)
- Last race: 2024 Kubota Tractor 200 (Kansas)
Wins	Top tens	Poles
0	1	0

ARCA Menards Series career
- 9 races run over 7 years
- Best finish: 54th (2004)
- First race: 2002 BPU 200 (Kansas)
- Last race: 2010 Lucas Oil Slick Mist 200 (Daytona)
Wins	Top tens	Poles
0	3	0
- Statistics up to date as of September 27, 2024.

Jennifer Jo Cobb (born June 12, 1973) is an American professional stock car racing driver and team owner. She last competed part-time in the NASCAR Craftsman Truck Series, driving the No. 10 truck for her own team, Jennifer Jo Cobb Racing. She has also previously competed in the NASCAR Xfinity Series, ARCA Menards Series and the NASCAR Whelen Euro Series.

== Racing career ==
Cobb started racing in 1991 at Lakeside Speedway. Her father, Joe Cobb, races at Lakeside Speedway in the modified division. Since 2002, she has made nine starts in the ARCA Racing Series, including three top-10s in three starts in 2004 while driving for Keith Murt.

In 2004, Cobb made her NASCAR debut in the Busch Series at Homestead-Miami Speedway. She drove the No. 50 Vassarette Chevrolet for Keith Coleman Racing and finished 43rd due to a crash on lap 2.

In 2006, Cobb created a line of clothing for female race fans called Driver Boutique. Proceeds from the sales of this line go towards her racing efforts, and she has attempted to qualify for various Busch and ARCA races in 2007 with the Driver Boutique sponsorship.

On July 19, 2008, she competed in the Camping World Truck Series event at the Built Ford Tough 225. She started in 35th and finished 26 driving the No. 74 Dodge for The Annexus Group completing 144 laps. On April 27, 2009 she competed at the O'Reilly Auto Parts 250 driving the No. 73 Dodge for Derrike Cope Inc. She started 34th and completed 72 laps before experiencing engine trouble, finishing 26th out of 35 drivers winning a purse of $10,680.

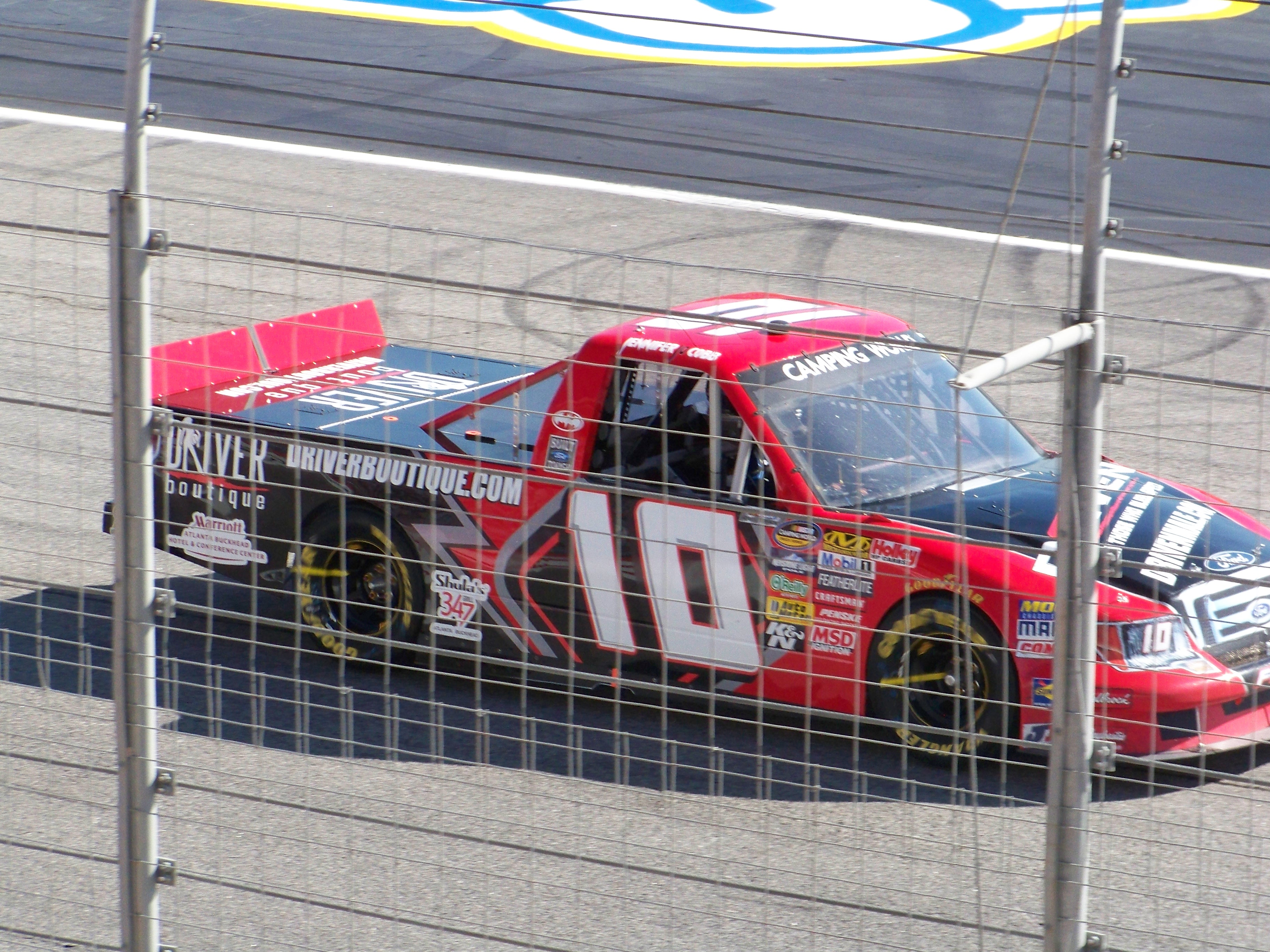
Cobb's 2010 truck at Atlanta

In 2010, Cobb announced that she would run full-time in the truck series, after purchasing the assets of the No. 10 truck team from Rick Crawford, whose Circle Bar Racing downsized from a two-truck operation to one — Crawford's own No. 14 (which would also close down early in the season). Cobb kept the same truck number and owner points from Circle Bar. Also that year, Cobb became the highest female points finisher in history in any of the three major NASCAR Series to that time, achieving 17th place.

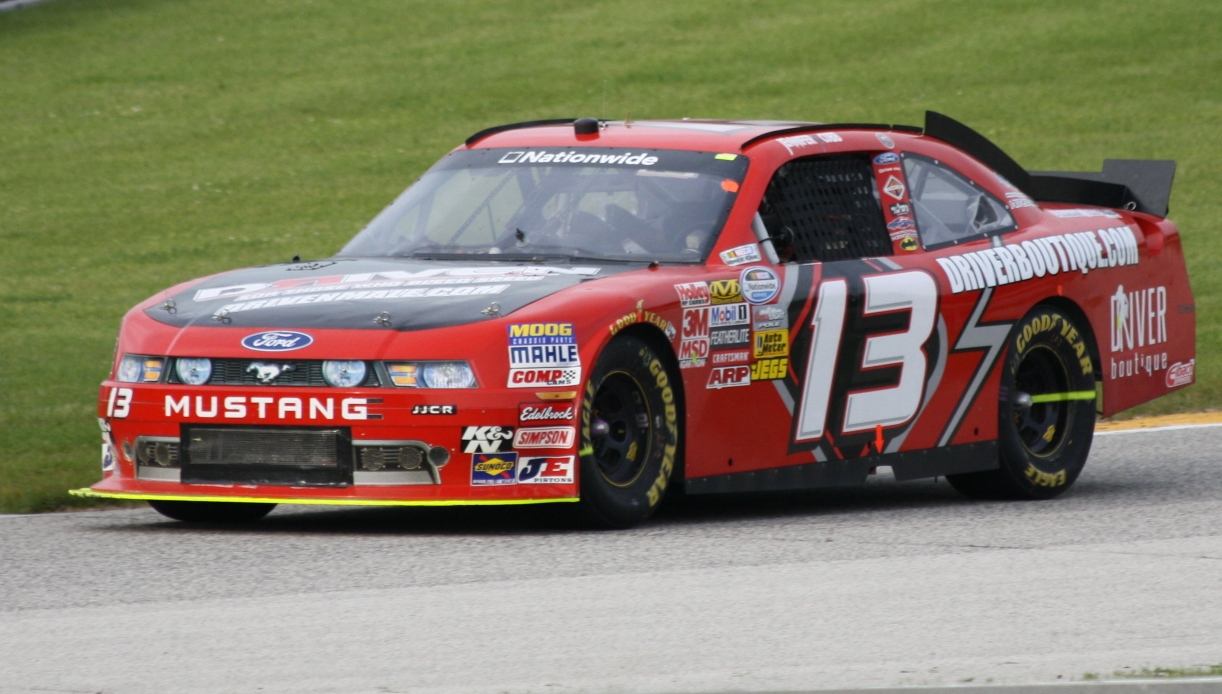
Cobb's No. 13 Nationwide car at Road America in 2011

For 2011, Cobb continued racing her own No. 10 truck full-time in the Camping World Truck Series, and also drove the first five races in the Nationwide Series in the No. 79 for 2nd Chance Motorsports. On the truck side, Cobb became the highest finishing female in Truck Series history by finishing 6th at the 2011 NextEra Energy Resources 250. She would hold this record for nine years, when Natalie Decker broke the record with a fifth-place finish, also at the season-opening Daytona race, in 2020. Cobb later announced that she would run the full season with 2nd Chance Motorsports in their No. 79 Ford and run for Rookie of the Year. Cobb later gave her truck's owners points to Chase Mattioli and his team while she also started her own driver development program with Cody Cambensy planning to drive in the Truck Series in 2011. She later left 2nd Chance Motorsports after a dispute with owner Rick Russell over whether to start and park after losing their second car at Las Vegas. Rick Ware Racing later gave her a ride in the No. 41.

In early 2011, Cobb for her own team called Jennifer Jo Cobb Racing and partnered with U.S. Army Family and MWR Command to launch Driven 2 Honor, a promotion honoring women in the U.S. military. Cobb hosted two female service members and their guests at the first five Nationwide races of the 2011 NASCAR season.

=== 2012–2018 ===
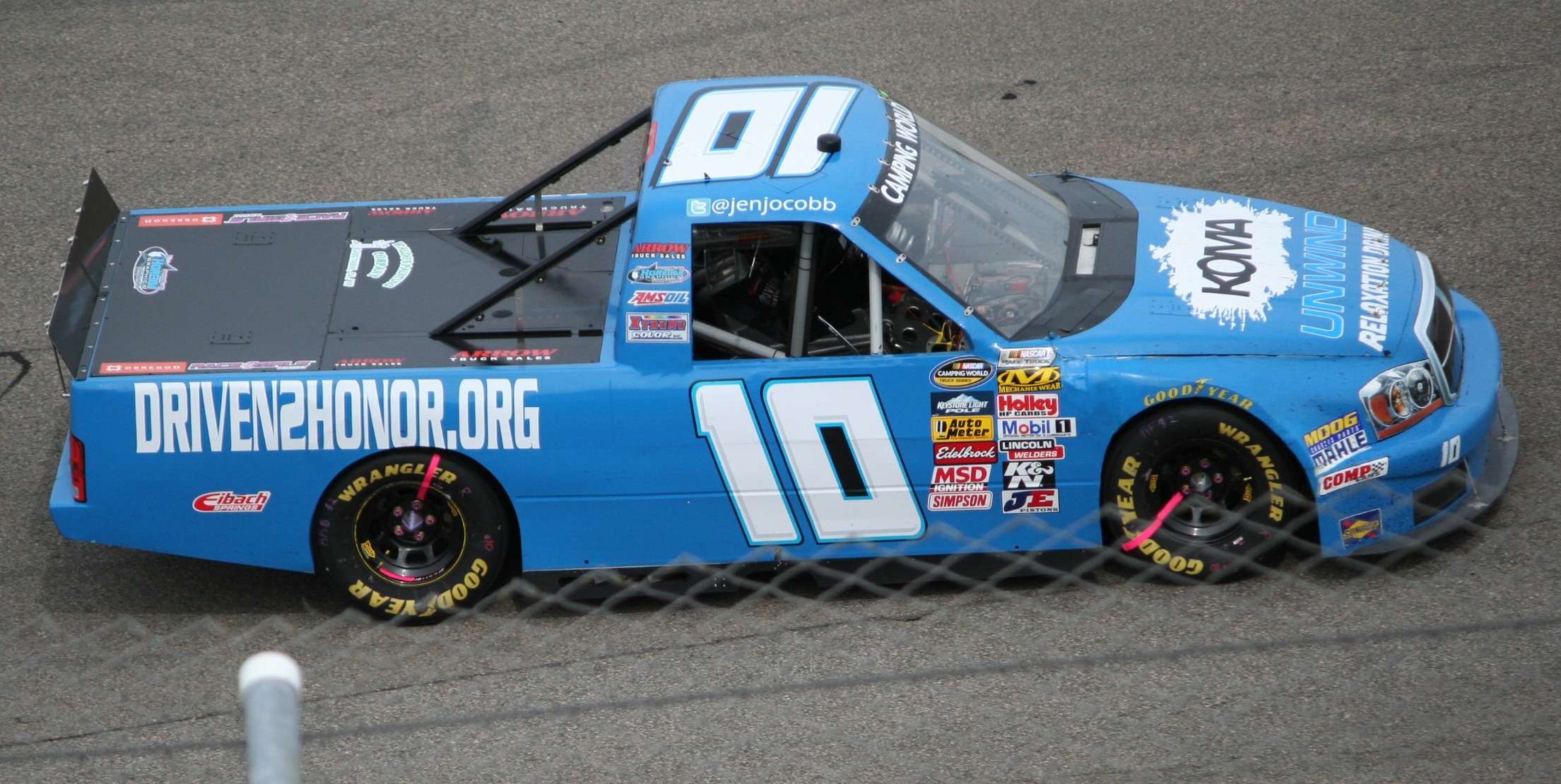
Cobb's 2013 truck at Rockingham Speedway

In 2012 Cobb ran the entire Camping World Truck Series schedule in the No. 10, along with selected Nationwide Series races in the No. 13. She returned to the Camping World Truck Series for 2013.

For the 2014 season, Cobb again ran in the Truck Series in her own No. 10 Chevrolet Silverado. The team began the season with a 21st-place finish in the NextEra Energy Resources 250. At the SFP 250 Cobb raced to 13th place which earned her highest finish of the season, she then had another strong run at the North Carolina Education Lottery 200 (Charlotte) finishing 16th. However, since that 16th-place finish, the team has seen a decline in performance as they have only managed to eclipse a best of 20th on three occasions (Dover, Kentucky, and Michigan).

Cobb also ran one race in the No. 87 car for Rick Ware Racing at the Kansas Lottery 300 finishing 24th, which was her first Nationwide Series start of 2014.

On May 29, 2015, Cobb angrily approached the race car driven by Tyler Reddick on foot after apparently by being spun out by Reddick's truck at the Lucas Oil 200. It was expected that Cobb would be the first driver penalized under the new NASCAR rule instituted after Kevin Ward Jr. died in a similar incident. She wound up receiving a $5,000 fine from the officials.

During practice for the 2015 Chevrolet Silverado 250 at Canadian Tire Motorsport Park, Cobb crashed and was subsequently caught on camera removing a cell phone from her truck. Cobb was given a P3 penalty by NASCAR for having a non-engine electronic component in her truck. As a result, Cobb was fined $5,000, plus an additional $2,500 for an infraction occurring while still on probation for the incident with Reddick. Cobb was the first driver penalized by NASCAR under the no cell phone rule since it was implemented following the 2012 Daytona 500.

In 2018, Cobb joined Racing Total for her NASCAR Whelen Euro Series debut at Circuit Ricardo Tormo in Valencia.

=== 2020–2024 ===
In 2020, Cobb led a career-high 16 laps at Talladega Superspeedway before finishing 24th.

In April 2021, it was announced that Cobb would make her NASCAR Cup Series debut in the spring race at Talladega, driving the No. 15 for Rick Ware Racing. However, NASCAR announced on April 19 that she would not be approved to run the race. This was likely due to how the race itself would have been her first time in a Cup car because of the lack of practice and qualifying. NASCAR also did not approve James Davison and Keith McGee to make their Cup and Truck Series debuts, respectively, at Talladega in 2020 for the same reason. J. J. Yeley would replace Cobb in the RWR No. 15 in the race. That year she withdrew from the Rackley Roofing 200. 2022 began with Cobb again missing the season opener at Daytona. The week of the second race at Las Vegas, Cobb released a statement that she would be scaling her operation back to part time, citing funding and equipment issues.

2025 was the first season since her debut in 2008 that she did not compete in the Truck Series.

== Personal life ==
Cobb is married to, but currently separated from, NASCAR crew chief and former driver Eddie Troconis, who was Cobb's crew chief in the Xfinity Series in 2012. They married in 2015. Cobb had reportedly been dating spotter Clayton Hughes at the time of Troconis' arrest in January 2022 for assaulting Hughes. In September 2026, Tracey Hughes, the ex-wife of Clayton Hughes, was awarded $850,002 in a lawsuit accusing Cobb of having an affair with Clayton.

== Motorsports career results ==
=== NASCAR ===
(key) (Bold – Pole position awarded by qualifying time. Italics – Pole position earned by points standings or practice time. * – Most laps led.)

==== Xfinity Series ====
NASCAR Xfinity Series results
Year	Team	No.	Make	1	2	3	4	5	6	7	8	9	10	11	12	13	14	15	16	17	18	19	20	21	22	23	24	25	26	27	28	29	30	31	32	33	34	35	NXSC	Pts	Ref
2004	Keith Coleman Racing	50	Chevy	DAY	CAR	LVS	DAR	BRI	TEX	NSH	TAL	CAL	GTY	RCH	NZH	CLT	DOV	NSH	KEN	MLW	DAY	CHI	NHA	PPR	IRP	MCH	BRI	CAL	RCH	DOV	KAN	CLT	MEM	ATL	PHO	DAR	HOM; 43		149th	34	
2005	Red Cactus Racing	73	Chevy	DAY	CAL	MXC	LVS	ATL	NSH	BRI	TEX	PHO	TAL	DAR	RCH	CLT	DOV	NSH	KEN	MLW	DAY	CHI	NHA	PPR; DNQ	GTY	IRP	GLN	MCH	BRI	CAL	RCH	DOV	KAN	CLT	MEM	TEX	PHO	HOM	N/A	-	
2006	Jay Robinson Racing	49	Ford	DAY	CAL	MXC	LVS	ATL	BRI	TEX	NSH	PHO	TAL	RCH	DAR	CLT	DOV	NSH	KEN	MLW	DAY	CHI	NHA	MAR	GTY	IRP	GLN	MCH	BRI	CAL	RCH	DOV	KAN; 43	CLT	MEM	TEX	PHO	HOM	149th	34	
2007	Mike Harmon Racing	44	Chevy	DAY	CAL	MXC	LVS	ATL	BRI	NSH	TEX	PHO	TAL	RCH	DAR	CLT	DOV	NSH	KEN	MLW	NHA	DAY	CHI	GTY	IRP	CGV	GLN	MCH	BRI	CAL	RCH	DOV	KAN; DNQ	CLT	MEM	TEX	PHO; DNQ	HOM; DNQ	N/A	-	
2008	CFK Motorsports	78	Dodge	DAY	CAL	LVS	ATL	BRI	NSH	TEX	PHO	MXC	TAL	RCH	DAR	CLT	DOV	NSH	KEN	MLW	NHA	DAY	CHI	GTY	IRP	CGV	GLN	MCH	BRI	CAL	RCH	DOV	KAN; 30	CLT	MEM	TEX	PHO	HOM	127th	73	
2009	Derrike Cope Inc.	79	Dodge	DAY	CAL	LVS	BRI	TEX	NSH	PHO	TAL	RCH	DAR	CLT	DOV	NSH	KEN	MLW	NHA	DAY	CHI	GTY	IRP	IOW	GLN	MCH	BRI	CGV	ATL	RCH	DOV	KAN; DNQ	CAL	CLT	MEM	TEX	PHO		N/A	-	
2009	Mike Harmon Racing	84	Dodge																																			HOM; DNQ	N/A	-	
2010	Baker Curb Racing	27	Ford	DAY	CAL	LVS	BRI	NSH	PHO	TEX	TAL	RCH	DAR	DOV	CLT	NSH	KEN	ROA	NHA	DAY; 43																			116th	95	
2010	Jennifer Jo Cobb Racing	13	Ford																		CHI; DNQ	GTY	IRP	IOW	GLN	MCH	BRI	CGV	ATL	RCH	DOV	KAN; 34	CAL	CLT	GTY	TEX	PHO	HOM	116th	95	
2011	2nd Chance Motorsports	79	Ford	DAY; DNQ	PHO; 32	LVS; 31	BRI; QL^{†}																																29th	202	
2011	Rick Ware Racing	41	Ford					CAL; 38	TEX; 29	TAL; 37	NSH	RCH																											29th	202	
2011	Jennifer Jo Cobb Racing	13	Ford										DAR; 32	DOV; 37	IOW; 26	CLT; 31	CHI	MCH; 32	ROA; 29	DAY; 36				IRP; 42															29th	202	
2011	Jennifer Jo Cobb Racing	13	Dodge																		KEN; 32	NHA; 35	NSH; 29		IOW; 33	GLN	CGV	BRI; DNQ	ATL; 29	RCH; DNQ	CHI; DNQ	DOV	KAN; DNQ	CLT	TEX	PHO; DNQ	HOM; DNQ		29th	202	
2012	Jennifer Jo Cobb Racing	13	Dodge	DAY	PHO; DNQ	LVS; 36	BRI	CAL	TEX	RCH	TAL	DAR	IOW	CLT	DOV	MCH	ROA	KEN	DAY	NHA	CHI	IND	IOW	GLN	CGV	BRI	ATL	RCH	CHI	KEN	DOV	CLT							130th	0^{1}	
2012	Jennifer Jo Cobb Racing	13	Chevy																														KAN; 22	TEX; DNQ	PHO	HOM			130th	0^{1}	
2013	Rick Ware Racing	23	Ford	DAY	PHO	LVS	BRI	CAL	TEX	RCH	TAL	DAR	CLT	DOV	IOW	MCH	ROA	KEN	DAY	NHA	CHI	IND	IOW	GLN	MOH	BRI	ATL	RCH	CHI	KEN	DOV	KAN; 26	CLT	TEX	PHO	HOM			124th	0^{1}	
2014	Rick Ware Racing	87	Chevy	DAY	PHO	LVS	BRI	CAL	TEX	DAR	RCH	TAL	IOW	CLT	DOV	MCH	ROA	KEN	DAY	NHA	CHI	IND	IOW	GLN	MOH	BRI	ATL	RCH	CHI	KEN	DOV	KAN; 24	CLT	TEX	PHO	HOM			112th	0^{1}	
2015	Jennifer Jo Cobb Racing	10	Chevy	DAY	ATL	LVS	PHO	CAL	TEX	BRI	RCH	TAL	IOW	CLT	DOV	MCH	CHI	DAY	KEN	NHA	IND	IOW	GLN	MOH	BRI	ROA	DAR	RCH	CHI	KEN	DOV	CLT	KAN; 29	TEX	PHO	HOM			110th	0^{1}	
2016	Rick Ware Racing	25	Chevy	DAY	ATL	LVS	PHO	CAL	TEX	BRI	RCH	TAL	DOV	CLT	POC	MCH	IOW	DAY	KEN	NHA	IND	IOW	GLN	MOH	BRI	ROA	DAR	RCH	CHI	KEN	DOV	CLT	KAN; 29	TEX	PHO	HOM			123rd	0^{1}	
2017	B. J. McLeod Motorsports	78	Chevy	DAY	ATL	LVS	PHO	CAL	TEX	BRI	RCH	TAL	CLT	DOV	POC	MCH	IOW	DAY	KEN	NHA	IND	IOW	GLN	MOH	BRI	ROA	DAR	RCH	CHI	KEN	DOV	CLT	KAN; 35	TEX	PHO	HOM			113th	0^{1}	
2018	JP Motorsports	55	Toyota	DAY	ATL	LVS	PHO	CAL	TEX	BRI	RCH	TAL; 29	DOV	CLT	POC	MCH	IOW	CHI	DAY	KEN	NHA	IOW	GLN	MOH	BRI	ROA	DAR	IND	LVS	RCH	CLT	DOV	KAN	TEX	PHO	HOM			107th	0^{1}	
^{†} – Qualified but replaced by Chris Lawson

==== Craftsman Truck Series ====
NASCAR Craftsman Truck Series results
Year	Team	No.	Make	1	2	3	4	5	6	7	8	9	10	11	12	13	14	15	16	17	18	19	20	21	22	23	24	25	NCTC	Pts	Ref
2008	Derrike Cope Inc.	74	Dodge	DAY	CAL	ATL	MAR	KAN; 33	CLT	MFD	DOV	TEX	MCH	MLW	MEM	KEN; 26	IRP	NSH	BRI	GTW	NHA	LVS	TAL	MAR	ATL	TEX	PHO	HOM	90th	85	
2009	Derrike Cope Inc.	73	Dodge	DAY	CAL	ATL	MAR	KAN; 26	CLT	DOV	TEX	MCH	MLW	MEM	KEN	IRP	NSH	BRI	CHI	IOW	GTW	NHA	LVS	MAR					92nd	85	
2009	Boys Will Be Boys Racing	50	Dodge																						TAL; 36	TEX	PHO	HOM	92nd	85	
2010	Jennifer Jo Cobb Racing	10	Ford	DAY; 34	ATL; 21	MAR; 26	NSH; 25	KAN; 28	DOV; 22	CLT; 18	TEX; 14	MCH; 21	IOW; 25	GTY; 20	IRP; 26	POC; 27	NSH; 19	DAR; 14	BRI; 28	CHI; 22	KEN; 23	NHA; 22	LVS; 21	MAR; 33	TAL; 23	TEX; 24	PHO; 23	HOM; 24	17th	2326	
2011	Jennifer Jo Cobb Racing	10	Ford	DAY; 6	PHO	DAR	MAR	NSH; DNQ	DOV	CLT	KAN; 27	TEX	KEN; 30	IOW	NSH; 23	IRP; 32	POC	MCH	BRI; DNQ	ATL; 23	CHI; 29	NHA; 35			TAL; DNQ	MAR; DNQ		HOM; 35	90th	0^{1}	
2011	Jennifer Jo Cobb Racing	10	Dodge																				KEN; 20	LVS; 18			TEX; 20		90th	0^{1}	
2012	Jennifer Jo Cobb Racing	10	Ford	DAY; DNQ																									27th	248	
2012	Jennifer Jo Cobb Racing	8	Ram		MAR; 34																								27th	248	
2012	Jennifer Jo Cobb Racing	10	Ram			CAR; DNQ	KAN; 25	CLT; 26	DOV; 26	TEX; 32		IOW; 29	CHI; 23	POC; 36	MCH; 22	BRI; DNQ	ATL; DNQ	IOW; 30	KEN; 16	LVS; 28	TAL; 27	MAR	TEX; 27	PHO; DNQ	HOM; 31				27th	248	
2012	Jennifer Jo Cobb Racing	0	Ram								KEN; DNQ																		27th	248	
2013	Jennifer Jo Cobb Racing	10	Chevy	DAY; 35			KAN; 17		DOV; 27																				25th	262	
2013	Jennifer Jo Cobb Racing	10	Ram		MAR; 36	CAR; 31		CLT; DNQ		TEX; 27	KEN; 26	IOW; 32	ELD			BRI; DNQ	MSP; 23	IOW; 26	CHI; 28	LVS; 23	TAL; DNQ	MAR; DNQ	TEX; 29	PHO; 25	HOM; DNQ				25th	262	
2013	Jennifer Jo Cobb Racing	10	Ford											POC; 32	MCH; 25														25th	262	
2014	Jennifer Jo Cobb Racing	10	Chevy	DAY; 21		KAN; 13	CLT; 16		TEX; 20		KEN; 24	IOW; 30		POC; 24	MCH; 20			CHI; 21	NHA; 22	LVS; 22	TAL; 18		TEX; 24	PHO; 23	HOM; 32				16th	444	
2014	Jennifer Jo Cobb Racing	10	Ram		MAR; 27			DOV; 20		GTW; 27			ELD; DNQ			BRI; 27	MSP; 23					MAR; 28							16th	444	
2015	Jennifer Jo Cobb Racing	10	Chevy	DAY; 18	ATL; 26	MAR; 24	KAN; 19	CLT; 19	DOV; 32	TEX; 19	GTW; 20	IOW; 21	KEN; 23	ELD; 27	POC; 26	MCH; 19	BRI; 25	MSP; 20	CHI; 23	NHA; 22	LVS; 21	TAL; 32	MAR; 31	TEX; 24	PHO; 22	HOM; 26			17th	473	
2016	Jennifer Jo Cobb Racing	10	Chevy	DAY; DNQ	ATL; 29	MAR	KAN; 24	DOV; 30	CLT; 28	TEX; DNQ			KEN; 24													HOM; DNQ			30th	113	
2016	Jennifer Jo Cobb Racing	1	Chevy								IOW; 28	GTW; 29		ELD; 26	POC; 28	BRI	MCH; 17	MSP; 24	CHI; 22	NHA; 25	LVS; 27	TAL; DNQ	MAR	TEX; 30	PHO; 24				30th	113	
2017	Jennifer Jo Cobb Racing	10	Chevy	DAY; DNQ	ATL; DNQ	MAR	KAN; 27	CLT; 27	DOV; 30	TEX; 19	GTW; 30		KEN; 21	ELD	POC; 18	MCH; 22	BRI; 30	MSP; 27	CHI; 24	NHA; 24	LVS; 18	TAL; 19	MAR; 28	TEX; 22	PHO; 27				25th	221	
2017	Jennifer Jo Cobb Racing	0	Chevy									IOW; DNQ														HOM; 31			25th	221	
2018	Jennifer Jo Cobb Racing	10	Chevy	DAY; 31	ATL; 26	LVS; 24	MAR; 29	DOV; 22	KAN; 22	CLT; 26	TEX; 24	IOW; 22	GTW; 22	CHI; 24	KEN; 29	ELD; DNQ	POC; 22	MCH; 23	BRI; DNQ	MSP; 29	LVS; 12	TAL; 11	MAR; 29	TEX; 24	PHO; 31	HOM; 28			20th	271	
2019	Jennifer Jo Cobb Racing	10	Chevy	DAY; DNQ	ATL; 22	LVS; 27	MAR	TEX; 18	DOV; 25		CLT; DNQ	TEX; 18		GTW; 24	CHI; 21	KEN; 22	POC; 21	ELD; 19	MCH; 19	BRI; 22	MSP; 23	LVS; 24	TAL; 27	MAR; 27	PHO; DNQ	HOM; 28			21st	268	
2019	Jennifer Jo Cobb Racing	0	Chevy							KAN; 23			IOW; 25																21st	268	
2020	Jennifer Jo Cobb Racing	10	Chevy	DAY; DNQ	LVS; DNQ	CLT; 26	ATL; 36	HOM; 27	POC; 32	KEN; 37	TEX; 29	KAN; 31	KAN; 32	MCH; 28	DAY; 31	DOV; 29	GTW; 31	DAR; 30	RCH; 36	BRI; 28	LVS; 34	TAL; 24	KAN; 29	TEX; 24	MAR; 29	PHO; 31			30th	158	
2021	Jennifer Jo Cobb Racing	10	Chevy	DAY; 18	DAY; 35	LVS; 29	ATL; 38	BRI; 33	RCH; 38		DAR; 24	COA; DNQ					KNX; 25												35th	107	
2021	Jennifer Jo Cobb Racing	10	Ford							KAN; 37			CLT; 33	TEX; 31	NSH; Wth	POC; 31		GLN; 36	GTW; 38	DAR; 36	BRI; 27	LVS; 27	TAL; 31	MAR; 36	PHO; DNQ				35th	107	
2022	Jennifer Jo Cobb Racing	10	Chevy	DAY; DNQ	LVS	ATL	COA	MAR	BRI	DAR	KAN	TEX	CLT	GTW	SON; Wth	KNO								TAL; 32	HOM	PHO			77th	5	
2022	Jennifer Jo Cobb Racing	10	Ford														NSH; DNQ	MOH	POC	IRP	RCH	KAN	BRI						77th	5	
2023	Jennifer Jo Cobb Racing	10	Chevy	DAY	LVS	ATL	COA	TEX	BRI	MAR	KAN	DAR	NWS	CLT	GTW	NSH	MOH	POC	RCH	IRP	MLW	KAN; 34	BRI	TAL; DNQ	HOM	PHO			80th	3	
2024	Jennifer Jo Cobb Racing	10	Chevy	DAY; DNQ	ATL	LVS	BRI	COA	MAR	TEX	KAN; 32	DAR	NWS	CLT; DNQ	GTW	NSH	POC	IRP	RCH	MLW	BRI	KAN; 31	TAL	HOM	MAR	PHO			68th	11	

==== Whelen Euro Series – Elite 1 ====
NASCAR Whelen Euro Series – Elite 1 results
Year	Team	No.	Make	1	2	3	4	5	6	7	8	9	10	11	12	13	NWES	Pts	Ref
2019	Alex Caffi Motorsport	1	Ford	VAL	VAL	FRA	FRA	BRH; 27	BRH; 27	MOS	MOS	VEN	HOC	HOC	ZOL	ZOL	44th	20	

==== Whelen Euro Series – Elite 2 ====
NASCAR Whelen Euro Series – Elite 2 results
Year	Team	No.	Make	1	2	3	4	5	6	7	8	9	10	11	12	13	NWES	Pts	Ref
2018	Racing-Total	10	Chevy	VAL; 17	VAL; 19	FRA	FRA	BRH	BRH	TOU	TOU	HOC	HOC	ZOL	ZOL		38th	38	
2019	Racing-Total JJCR	10	Chevy	VAL; DNS	VAL; 20	FRA	FRA	BRH	BRH	MOS	MOS	VEN	HOC	HOC	ZOL	ZOL	41st	17	

^{*} Season still in progress
^{1} Ineligible for series points

=== ARCA Racing Series ===
(key) (Bold – Pole position awarded by qualifying time. Italics – Pole position earned by points standings or practice time. * – Most laps led.)

ARCA Racing Series results
Year	Team	No.	Make	1	2	3	4	5	6	7	8	9	10	11	12	13	14	15	16	17	18	19	20	21	22	23	ARSC	Pts	Ref
2002	Roberts-Albright Racing	0	Pontiac	DAY	ATL	NSH	SLM	KEN	CLT	KAN; 16	POC	MCH	TOL	SBO	KEN	BLN	POC	NSH	ISF	WIN	DSF	CHI	SLM	TAL	CLT		130th	150	
2003	Cunningham Motorsports	4	Ford	DAY	ATL	NSH	SLM	TOL	KEN	CLT	BLN	KAN; 33	MCH	LER	POC	POC	NSH	ISF	WIN	DSF	CHI	SLM	TAL	CLT	SBO		179th	65	
2004	KLM Motorsports	19	Chevy	DAY	NSH	SLM	KEN	TOL	CLT	KAN; 9	POC	MCH	SBO	BLN	KEN	GTW	POC	LER	NSH; 7	ISF	TOL	DSF	CHI; 10	SLM	TAL		54th	560	
2007	Jennifer Jo Cobb Racing	82	Chevy	DAY; DNQ	USA	NSH	SLM	KAN; 25	WIN	KEN	TOL	IOW	POC	MCH	BLN	KEN	POC	NSH	ISF	MIL	GTW	DSF	CHI	SLM	TAL	TOL	137th	130	
2008	Rick Markle Racing	68	Dodge	DAY	SLM	IOW	KEN	CAR	KEN	TOL	POC	MCH	CAY	KEN	BLN	POC	NSH	ISF	DSF	CHI; 19	SLM	NJE	TAL	TOL			122nd	135	
2009	Hylton Motorsports	08	Ford	DAY	SLM	CAR	TAL	KEN	TOL	POC	MCH	MFD	IOW	KEN	BLN	POC	ISF	CHI	TOL	DSF	NJE	SLM	KAN; 39	CAR			154th	35	
2010	Bowsher-Mooi Motorsports	21	Chevy	DAY; 19	PBE	SLM	TEX	TAL	TOL	POC	MCH	IOW	MFD	POC	BLN	NJE	ISF	CHI	DSF	TOL	SLM	KAN	CAR				101st	145	
