= Start and park =

Term used to describe the practice of starting races but parking after a few laps

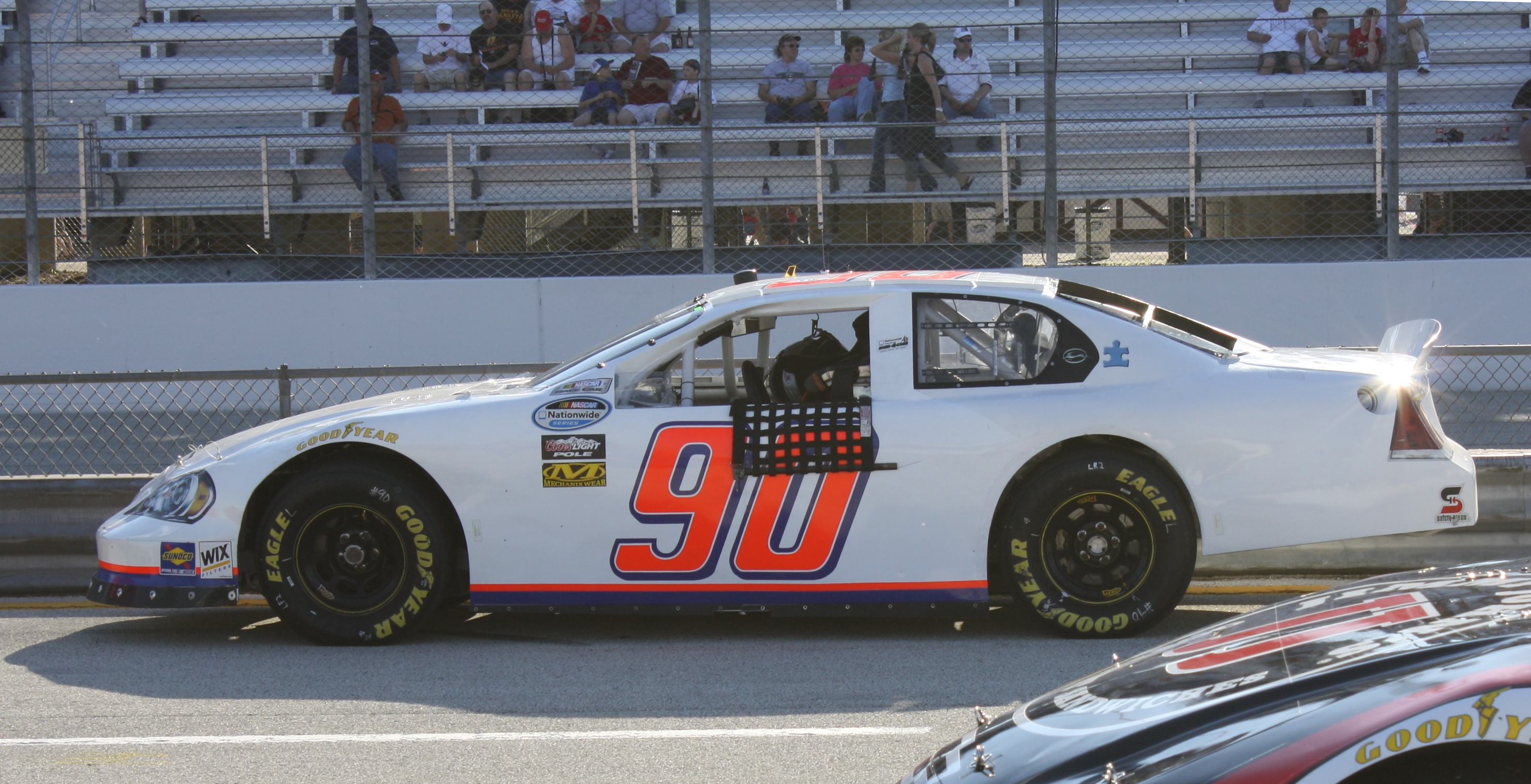
Johnny Chapman and MSRP were one of the more notable start and park combinations in NASCAR in the late 2000s.

Start and park is a term used in auto racing, particularly in NASCAR-sanctioned races, to describe the practice of racing teams starting races but pulling the car off the track after just a few laps in order to collect prize money while avoiding expenses such as replacement tires, engine wear and tear, and hiring a pit crew. The practice has existed due to the relatively high purse for even a back-of-the-pack finish, as well as the high costs of fielding a car for an entire race. While start-and-park entries occasionally act as "field fillers" (a term typically used outside of NASCAR when a small number of teams show up to a racetrack), the practice is criticized in instances when they take spots away from teams intending to run the full race.

In some cases, a team will use a start-and-park car to help fund another competitive car in the same or a different series. This practice was prevalent in NASCAR's second national series O'Reilly Auto Parts Series, notably by The Motorsports Group, RSS Racing (only number 38 or 93 to help fund the no. 39 team) and TriStar Motorsports. However, there are some cases in which a small underfunded team does use this money to eventually run full races, or conserve the car. Teams like NEMCO Motorsports, Leavine Family Racing, and Phil Parsons Racing have done this in the past, before transitioning to running full races. Other reasons possible are for better funded teams to have a used engine available, especially with a NASCAR rule imposed that requires teams to run a previously raced engine in multiple races. Such start and park teams may have a deal with a works-level team for engines. When the engine is used for a few laps in testing mode, the car can be parked after a few laps and the engine be used in another race by another team. (The rule states if a team won a race, the engine must be reused by the same team.) Likewise, the smaller team can use the engine from the works team's non-winning race engine and use it in their operation for the works team while the works team uses the previously used team by the smaller team in a future race.

A visible increase in the presence of starting and parking in the 21st century made it one of the more polarizing and controversial topics in the sport. In 2013 and 2014, changes in the structuring of prize money awards and qualifying procedures made starting and parking less attractive, encouraging (or forcing) low-budget teams to run full races. Further reductions in field size and the structuring of qualifying and structure of prize money later in the decade have curbed the practice considerably, particularly at the Cup level.

== Description ==
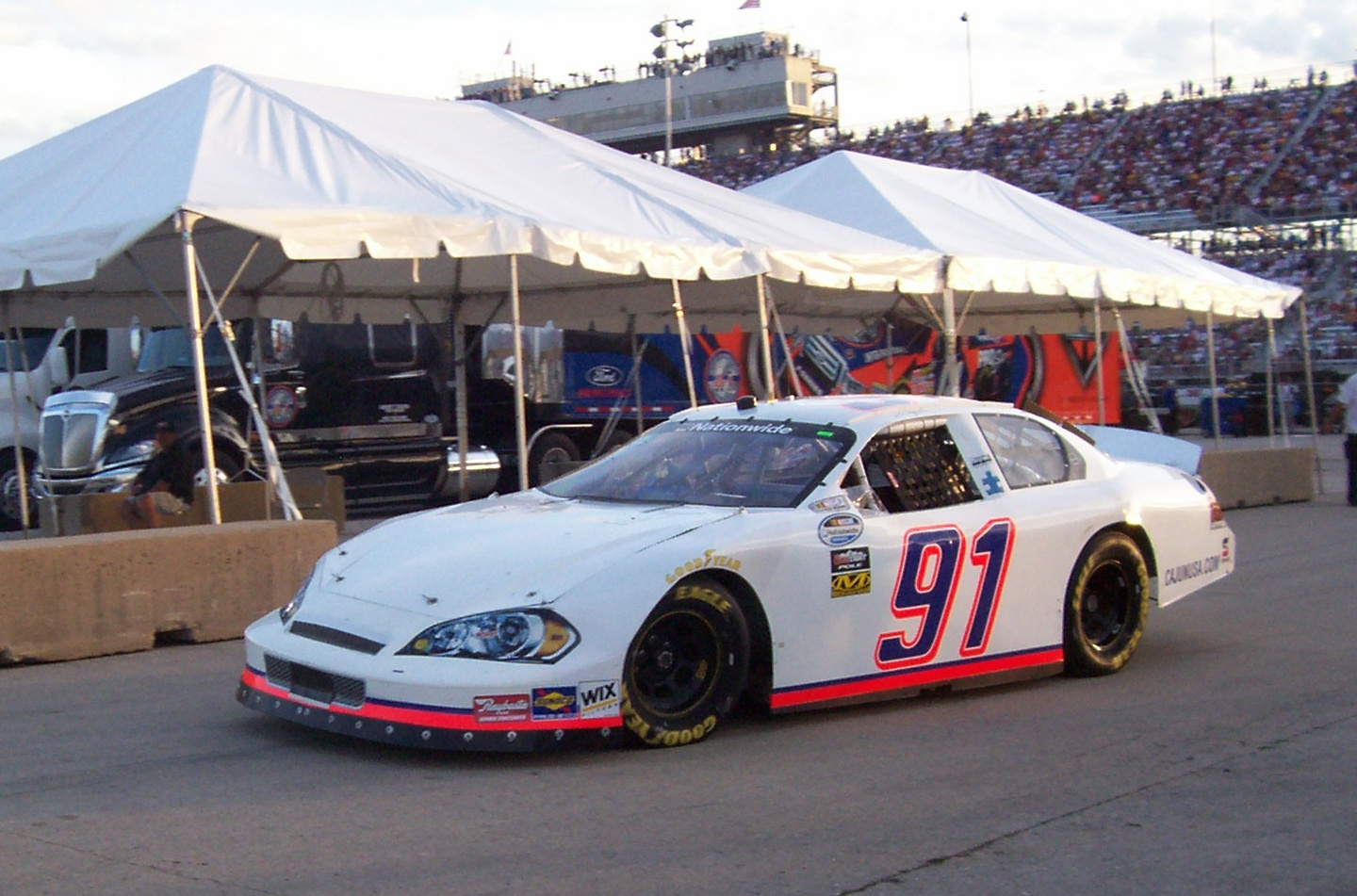
Terry Cook's 91 MSRP Chevy in 2009.

A start and park occurs when a race team pulls out of an event early on, rather than completing the full race, and will be credited with a did not finish (DNF). The practice is the result of the high costs of running full-length races including hiring a pit crew, as well as the high payout from simply starting a race. For example, at a June 2009 Cup Series race, Joe Nemechek earned $64,725 after finishing 41st in a start and park effort, while Dexter Bean ran the entire race to a 36th-place finish and earned only $725 more ($65,450). New teams may start and park to gain funds, experience, and information to run future races competitively. Cup teams such as Germain Racing, Tommy Baldwin Racing, and Phil Parsons Racing have parked in many of their early starts, before finding sponsorship and success in later endeavors.

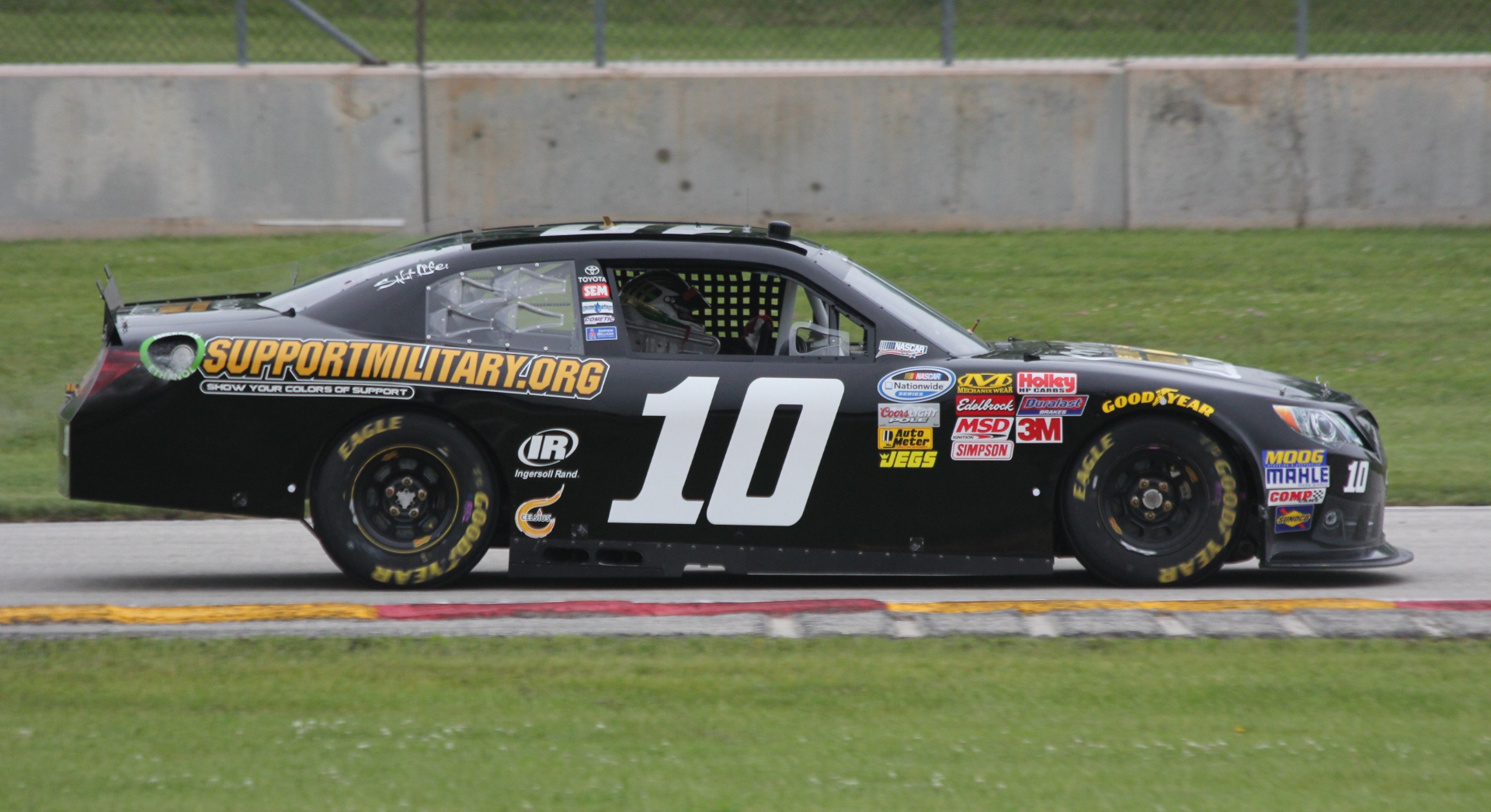
Jeff Green's No. 10 TriStar Toyota in 2014.

Another popular practice among start and park teams was to field one or multiple additional cars to earn money so their primary cars could run the full race. For example, since 2011, 2000 Busch Series Champion Jeff Green has start and parked in most of his starts for TriStar Motorsports, while the team's other cars (which often have some sponsorship) have run the full race. Green's entry, according to owner Mark Smith, acts as somewhat of an R&D car, and allows the team to field multiple full-time entries. Green had the most last place finishes in every year in the now O'Reilly Auto Parts Series between 2011 and 2013 — a total of 37 last place finishes — and set the series record for career last place finishes in 2015 with 76. Another notable example is The Motorsports Group (formerly Key Motorsports), whose main car is a No. 40 car driven by Mike Bliss. Between 2011 and 2014, the team fielded No. 42, No. 46, and No. 47 cars as start and park entries to fund the No. 40, though they stopped running the No. 42 and No. 47 teams after 2013.

=== Identifying a start and park ===
When retiring from a race, a start and park team will usually list a mechanical failure as the reason for not finishing (transmission, electrical, overheating, suspension, etc...) as required by NASCAR. Because of this, there is no official way to determine if a team intended to not finish without impounding the race car for a full inspection. This was done at a Sprint Cup race at Auto Club Speedway in 2010, where NASCAR impounded Prism Motorsports' 41st finishing No. 66 car driven by Dave Blaney after Blaney qualified fifth and led three laps before retiring with an "engine issue". NASCAR currently does not keep start-and-park statistics.

Besides back of the pack finishes, another way to identify start and park teams is by monitoring the number of laps a team completes over the course of the season, or the percentage of each race the entry competes in. Phil Parsons Racing and Michael McDowell, for example, completed 34 percent of the laps possible during their 2013 season, while the team with new driver Josh Wise completed over 90 percent the next year.

=== Field fillers ===
"Field filler" is a term describing teams and drivers that enter a race only when there are not enough entries to fill the full starting grid, thus guaranteeing the team a spot in the field. Frequently, these entries have no intention or capability of running competitively, either starting and parking or running the full race well below the pace of the leaders. The term is occasionally used interchangeably with the term "backmarker" as used in events outside of NASCAR, such as Formula One and IndyCar.

Like start-and-parking, the practice in NASCAR has been the subject of criticism, mainly due to the safety issues of cars running well below reasonable speeds, or creating accidents that collect competitive drivers running for the championship. NASCAR has also been accused of allowing noncompetitive entries into the race — or inviting the teams themselves — in order to fill the full 40-car starting grid (such as two 2004 incidents mentioned below).

== Instances ==
=== Use in championship-deciding races ===
In a couple of cases, a team that entered the season finale with the points lead entered additional cars in order to maximize their chances of clinching the season championship. The extra car would prevent the contender from finishing last and would provide a back-up car in case the primary car suffered a mechanical failure at the starting grid (or failed to qualify altogether). The additional entry could also serve as a blocker of competing drivers, or could drop to the back of the field to allow the primary car to gain positions and points sufficient to clinch the championship, although unsportsmanlike conduct was never officially used nor condoned.

- For the 1981 season deciding race at Riverside International Raceway, Junior Johnson & Associates entered Richard Childress in the No. 41 car, in what would be his final start as a driver, in an effort to protect Darrell Waltrip's championship hopes (who entered the race with 83-point gap to championship rival Bobby Allison). Childress parked the car after five laps as intended; the backup plan was that if Waltrip had problems with his No. 11 car prior to the start of the race, he could switch to the No. 41. The team repeated the effort again for Waltrip's second championship in the 1982 season decider with J. D. McDuffie in the No. 70 car. DiGard Motorsports and Hagan Racing would also employ this strategy for the next 2 season finales at Riverside with Jimmy Insolo and Joe Millikan respectively.
- During the 1993 Hooters 500, the season finale, Dale Earnhardt, driving for Richard Childress Racing (RCR), entered the race with the championship lead. Mathematically, as long as Earnhardt did not finish worse than 34th, he would accumulate enough points to clinch the 1993 NASCAR Winston Cup Championship, his sixth title. RCR entered veteran Neil Bonnett in a second car numbered 31, and Bonnett qualified 35th as a team backup. The team arranged that Bonnett would step aside from the No. 31 car at the last minute in the event that Earnhardt's car, after pre-race inspection, suffered mechanical failure on the grid or during the pace laps. If Earnhardt started the race in the No. 31 car, by rule, he would be awarded full points for that entry. Earnhardt started in his primary car as expected, and Bonnett pulled off the track to finish last after five laps. The team gave the reason of "engine failure". Bonnett's intentional start and park helped maximize Earnhardt's finishing position, as only seven other cars had to drop out for Earnhardt to clinch the title.
- At the 1995 season finale, the NAPA 500, Hendrick Motorsports entered a fourth car just for this race just in case the unforeseen were to hit Jeff Gordon's car. If problems were to befall Gordon's car, the car would immediately pull off the track and retire from the race, or if Gordon's car had a problem found in inspection and was unable to make the start, Gordon could jump into the backup car and start the race in that car. This was the No. 58 Chevrolet with "Racing for a Reason" on the quarterpanels. Racing for a Reason referred to finding a cure for leukemia, a disease that owner Rick Hendrick had been diagnosed with. The team had originally hired Jimmy Horton to drive the car in the race. Horton qualified the car in 34th, but was unable to race it due to serious injuries suffered in a crash in the ARCA Bondo Mar-Hyde Series support race the day before the NAPA 500. Jeff Purvis was then hired to sub for Horton in the No. 58 and drove the car to a 26th-place finish, eight laps down. Gordon finished 32nd, 14 laps down, as the No. 24 car was struggling all day, but managed to clinch the championship nonetheless due to points difference between him and eventual race winner (and championship rival) Dale Earnhardt, helped by Gordon's teammate Ken Schrader suffering from an engine failure early in the race.
- During the 2003 season finale of the Craftsman Truck Series at Homestead–Miami Speedway, a four-way battle for the championship was set up between Brendan Gaughan, Travis Kvapil, and Ted Musgrave (and Dennis Setzer, whose team did not field an extra truck for the race). In an attempt to ensure victory, Musgrave's owner Jim Smith entered a total of five trucks, all with sponsorship, to run the full race. Kvapil's Xpress Motorsports team also entered a second truck (No. 11) with former series champion Jack Sprague (who had moved to the team after losing his ride in the Cup Series earlier in the year), and Gaughan's Orleans Racing entered a No. 61 truck for Scott Lynch, their developmental driver. Smith's No. 7 truck driven by Tyler Walker was involved in several incidents, and would finish seven laps down. The most controversial result of the five Ultra Motorsports trucks occurred on lap 100 when Smith's No. 10 truck driven by Marty Houston (whose brother Andy drove the full-time No. 2) spun exiting turn four, coming down the track and spinning out Gaughan, who was t-boned in the driver's side on the frontstretch by a third truck. The incident cost Gaughan the championship, eventually claimed by Kvapil after Musgrave was black flagged late in the running for a restart violation.

=== 2004 ===
In 2004, Phoenix Racing, a team known for its prowess at superspeedways, and veteran driver Joe Ruttman, gained notoriety for failing to hire a pit crew during the Subway 400 at Rockingham Speedway. NASCAR black flagged Ruttman's No. 09 Dodge for not having a pit crew and parking the car after only one lap. The team earned $54,196 for their efforts, but were referred to as "sort of a sham" by NASCAR vice president Jim Hunter. It had been rumored, however, that NASCAR itself had contacted teams (including Phoenix) to fill the 43-car field after only 37 entries planned on running the race, an accusation the sanctioning body denied. Kirk Shelmerdine's No. 72 Ford was also black flagged eight minutes into the race for not maintaining minimum speed on the one mile track, adding to the speculation. Although Phoenix Racing owner James Finch vowed never to start-and-park again, the team would start-and-park again in the future. Two races later at Darlington, Andy Hillenburg (one of the drivers believed to be a field filler at Rockingham) was spun by Tony Stewart and collected Jeff Gordon in the process, after Hillenburg was running well below the pace of the leaders.

=== 2009–2012 ===
By mid-to-late 2000s, the number of start and park teams had noticeably increased. Second national series (now NASCAR O'Reilly Auto Parts Series) director Joe Balash stated that the growing purses available for competing, primarily from the ESPN media contract from 2007-14, was responsible for the increase, while drivers and car owners cited the state of the economy and costs of competing as the reason for the prevalence of the practice. Among the most well-known examples was the Nationwide Series team MSRP Motorsports, which famously started and parked their unsponsored No. 90 and No. 91 cars in nearly 198 starts from 2009 to 2010. They ran only two full races, at Watkins Glen in 2009 with Dave Blaney (this car only had a sponsor because another car carrying the sponsor failed to qualify), and at Road America in 2010 with Patrick Long (a sponsored road course ringer) driving the car.

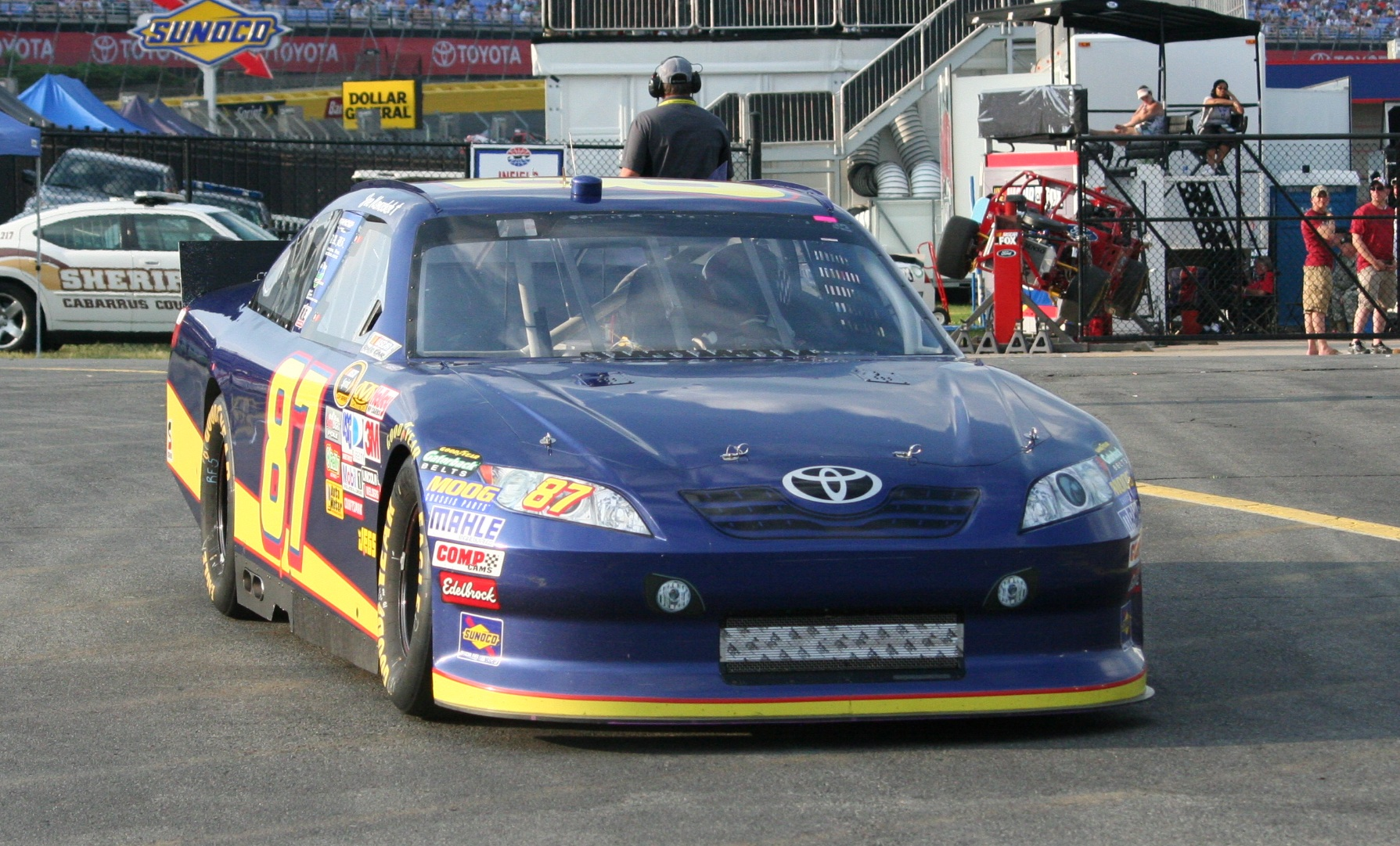
Joe Nemechek's 87 car in 2011.

In 2009, several Cup teams start-and-parked on a regular basis, including the No. 66 of Prism Motorsports (MSRP's Cup team), the No. 36 of rookie team Tommy Baldwin Racing, the No. 87 of Joe Nemechek's NEMCO Motorsports, Front Row Motorsports' No. 37, and the No. 71 of TRG Motorsports. While Prism and NEMCO ran almost exclusively start and park (NEMCO used the funds from the Cup team to support the unsponsored No. 87 Nationwide Series team), TBR ran some full races when funding and resources were available. Front Row's No. 37 car was run to support their full-time No. 34 car run by John Andretti, with both cars advertising owner Bob Jenkins' Taco Bell and Long John Silver's franchises. TRG meanwhile would run full races with 2000 Cup champion Bobby Labonte and sponsor Taxslayer, while parking with David Gilliland when there was no sponsor. Phoenix Racing, which had sponsorship from Miccosukee Resort & Gaming, ran full races in Hendrick Chevys for Brad Keselowski (10 races) and Ron Fellows (two races), while often parking in Dodges with veterans Sterling Marlin and Mike Bliss. Fellows ran competitively during his road course races, and Keselowski scored his and Finch's first victory at Talladega. Aric Almirola ran the full race at Loudon, finishing 29th in a Dodge. The fall race at Martinsville saw Sterling Marlin attempt to run the full race, but brake failure cut Marlin's race short after 355 laps. He would finish 35th in what would be his final start.

During the first twelve races of the 2009 NASCAR Sprint Cup season, Blaney, the driver of Prism's No. 66 Toyota, earned over $1.1 million after completing only two of the races and 21% of all possible laps. At the June 2009 Camping World Truck Series race at Texas, 10 of the 33 entrants parked their trucks by the end of lap 26.

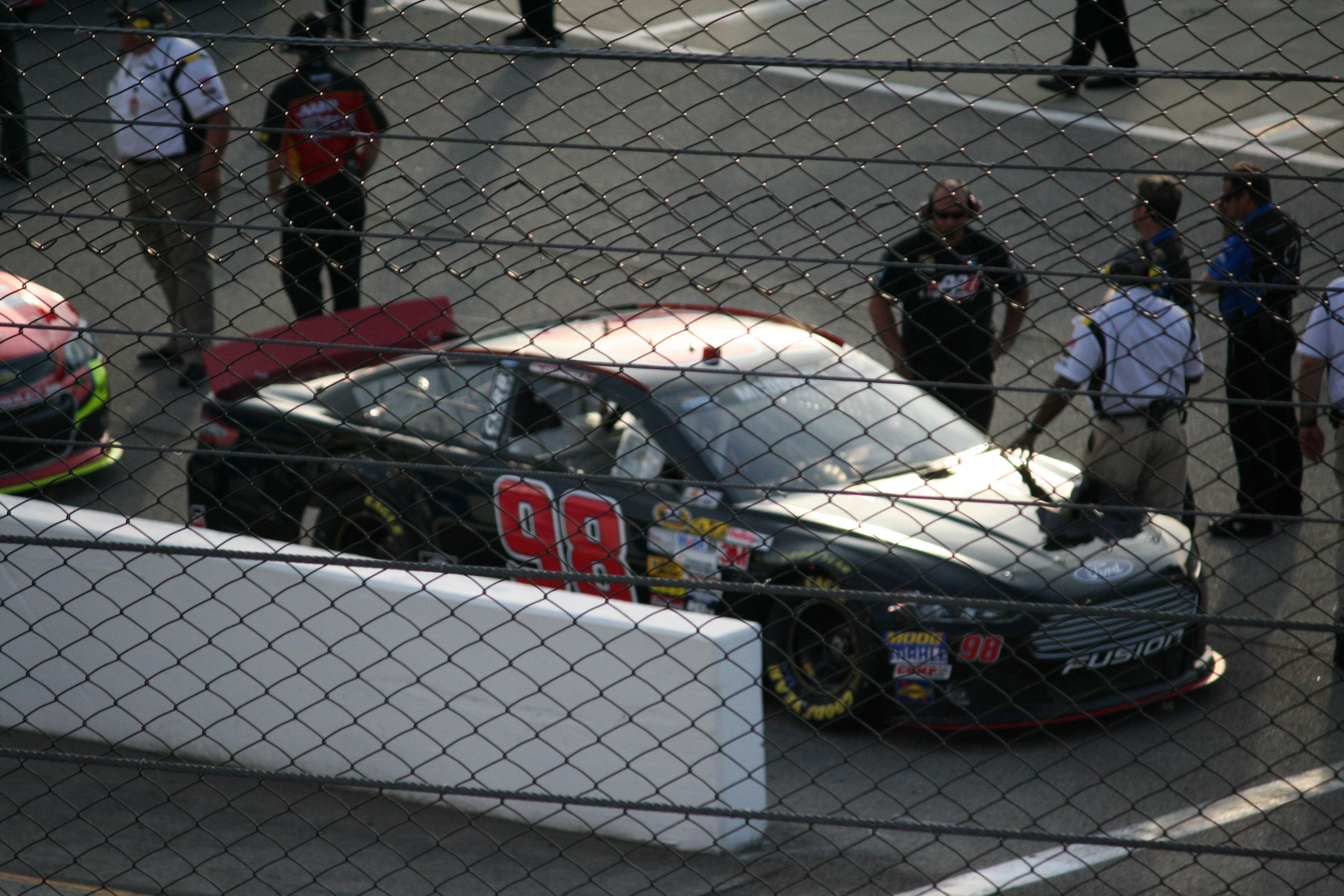
Phil Parsons Racing, one of the most notable start and park organizations, began running full races on a regular basis in 2014.

On March 19, 2011, before the start of the NASCAR Nationwide race at Bristol Motor Speedway, driver Jennifer Jo Cobb refused to start and walked away from the No. 79 2nd Chance Motorsports car after she was allegedly instructed less than ten minutes prior to the race by car owner Rick Russell to start and park rather than race to completion, and that the team would be replacing her the following week. Russell's argument was that their secondary car was heavily damaged the previous week at Las Vegas. Cobb said that she had agreed to race carefully to completion to preserve the car for future races, but objected to Russell telling her to start and park, especially in light of her contract that required her to pay for tires and engines. The team replaced her with Chris Lawson, who ran four laps before parking the car. Cobb is the first driver to publicly refuse to start a race when instructed to start and park.

=== 2013–2015 ===
In an effort to reduce start and park entries, in 2013 NASCAR reduced the size of the Nationwide Series starting grid from 43 cars (then the size of a Cup Series field) to 40 cars. In 2013 and 2014, the sport restructured the prize money structures of its national series, and eliminated the top 35 rule which previously guaranteed the top 35 teams in terms of owners' points a spot in the field. These changes gradually diminished the number of start and parks by 2013, but they still appeared on a weekly basis. Following a race manipulation scheme at 2013 Federated Auto Parts 400, it was clarified that start and park entries are not subject to a rule requiring competitors to compete within the fullest of their ability that was developed after the incident.

By 2014, starting and parking was mostly nonexistent in the Sprint Cup Series, with even former parker Phil Parsons Racing (the successor to MSRP and Prism) implementing measures and making partnerships to run full races. Only one car practiced start and park in 2014, the No. 93 BK Racing Toyota, part of a team that fields three other cars that run the full distances. The 93 was mainly entered when there were fewer than 43 entries just to bring the field to 43 cars.

The only instance of start and park during the 2015 season came at the Sprint Showdown at Charlotte Motor Speedway. After completing just 18 of the 40 laps, Mike Bliss took his unsponsored No. 32 FAS Lane Racing car behind the wall with a reported vibration. On lap 20, Landon Cassill and his No. 40 Hillman–Circle Sport Chevy exited the race claiming engine troubles. At the same time, the No. 7 Tommy Baldwin Racing entry of Alex Bowman withdrew from the race citing electrical issues. Starting in 2015, NASCAR reduced the field of the NASCAR Camping World Truck Series from 36 to 32 trucks, trying to avoid start and parks.

=== 2016–present ===
For the 2016 season, NASCAR implemented a charter system in the Cup Series, under which 36 specified teams were granted "charters" giving them guaranteed placement in all Cup Series races. At the same time, the race field was reduced from 43 to 40. As teams must have competed in the Cup Series full-time for the past three consecutive seasons (beginning from the establishment of the system in 2016; charters are otherwise transferrable between teams) in order to have acquired a charter, teams can be forced, at NASCAR's discretion (for instance, in 2023, although Rick Ware Racing's No. 51 met the criteria, the team was not stripped of the charter), to sell their charters if they finish in the bottom three of the owners' standings for three seasons in a row, and only up to four positions are available to non-chartered teams, this system primarily rewards established teams that have committed to participate across the entire season. These changes, as well as a reduced fixed purse for non-chartered teams, effectively reduces the viability of start and park strategies, but has also reduced the ability of new teams with sponsors to develop. Unsponsored teams stay out much longer than previously. However, they still park if they cannot afford to run the full race. Whereas at the Cup level starting and parking has been practically abolished, in the Xfinity Series and Craftsman Truck Series this operation continued to exist with multiple teams. In 2019, to further discourage the practice, NASCAR reduced the field of Xfinity Series from 40 to 38 cars and again to 36 cars in 2020, although they have since reinstated 38 cars in 2022. During the two-season (2020-21) pandemic changes where teams did not have practice or qualifying for most races, NASCAR reverted to 40 cars.

Since 2018, a NASCAR rule in all series require teams to reuse engines in multiple races, and with many teams leasing engines from factory teams, allows for a ruse. A fully funded team may use a start and park team to break in, or test, a new engine in practice, qualifying, and the race, before parking the car, which would allow the fully funded team to take the engine back, evaluate the engine with oil analysis, and legally reuse the engine that would have very few laps, but has been broken in, for a future race. The start and park team would be allowed to use a non-race winning engine used by fully funded team for its further races, which would allow both teams to get around the used engine rules, often for teams to help analyse the engine in further races. The only exception is when a specific team wins a race, that engine must be reused by that team with that number only.

A variation of start and park occurred at 2019 Ford EcoBoost 400, where the No. 77 of Spire Motorsports (a chartered entry; the remaining involved cars did not have any charters), No. 52 of Rick Ware Racing, and No. 15 of Premium Motorsports started the race, and then parked strategically during the later stages of the race; all teams involved reported that the retirement of each cars were for supposed mechanical issues. This action, designed to ensure that Premium Motorsports' No. 27 could claim the most owner points of all non-charter teams, was viewed as a form of race manipulation by NASCAR, resulting in sanctions for teams involved.
