= Randy Hill =

American businessman and NASCAR team owner (born 1967)

- Born: Randal W. Hill; September 26, 1967 (age 59); Dallas, Texas
- Occupations: Entrepreneur; NASCAR team owner (2011–2012)

Randal W. Hill (born September 26, 1967) is a Texas-based entrepreneur. He is known for his involvement in the semi trailer industry, particularly in repurposing retired transport trailers for storage and agricultural use. Hill has been named Republican Business Leader of the Year by the National Republican Congressional Committee, named Distinguished Alumni of the Year by the Dallas Christian School, and has served on the Texas Emerging Technology Fund (TETF) by the appointment of Governor Rick Perry.

In 2011, Hill launched a NASCAR team, Randy Hill Racing.

== Early life ==
Hill was born in Dallas, Texas and raised in the Dallas areas of Oak Cliff and Garland. He graduated from Dallas Christian High School in 1986 and attended in Abilene Christian University, where he played on the football team as a defensive tackle. He earned a degree in Journalism and Mass Communication.

== Career ==
Hill began his career as a sales representative for Transport International Pool, a subsidiary of GE Capital, which specialized in leasing and selling transport trailers. The company leased and sold trailers that were marketed exclusively as a mode of transport. In 1995, he founded Advanced Trailer, a company focused on repurposing retired transport trailers.

In response to growing demand from retailers for seasonal storage, Hill’s company began converting retired trailers for use as storage units. Advanced Trailer also converted ocean containers from steamship lines for public storage use.

In 1996, researchers at Texas Tech University in Lubbock developed a new method of transporting and drying peanuts. Advanced Trailer sold its first modified trailers for this purpose to farmers in West Texas and later expanded operations to include a facility in Vienna, Georgia. The company has since supplied trailers to multiple states and countries.

The trailers have also been adapted for drying various agricultural products, including grass seed, hay, almonds, and macadamia nuts. Hill has worked on trailer applications for heavy haul transport and equipment used in sectors such as oil and gas, wind energy, and military logistics. He holds patents related to agricultural drying processes, including those relevant to biofuel and biomass energy production.

== Personal life ==
Hill, his wife Janeé, and son Randal Harrell Hill reside in Fort Worth, Texas. Hill has three daughters, Miranda, Maggie and Macie, who live in Abilene. He has an interest in ranching, hunting, and fishing in West Texas. He is a member of the ACU Letterman's Association. Hill has also participated in community and educational initiatives connected to Abilene Christian University and Dallas Christian School.

In 2011, Hill established Randy Hill Racing, which competed in the ARCA Racing Series and NASCAR Nationwide Series.
