= Chuck Barnes Jr. =

American racing driver

- Born: June 1, 1982 (age 44); Louisville, Kentucky, U.S.

ARCA Menards Series career
- 3 races run over 2 years
- Best finish: 69th (2006)
- First race: 2006 Hantz Group 200 (Toledo)
- Last race: 2007 Eddie Gilstrap Motors Fall Classic by Advance Auto Parts (Salem)
- First win: 2006 Hantz Group 200 (Toledo)
Wins	Top tens	Poles
1	3	0
- Statistics up to date as of January 15, 2024.

Chuck Barnes Jr. (born June 1, 1982) is an American professional stock car racing driver who has previously competed in the ARCA Re/Max Series.

== Racing career ==
Barnes first began his racing career at the age of eleven, racing go-karts, where he went on to win several championships through the 1997 season. In 1997, he raced his ever first stock car race at Salem Speedway, finishing in seventh. He then competed in his first full season of stock car racing in 1998, finishing in the top-twenty in points at Louisville Motor Speedway in the NASCAR Sportsman Division and was the rookie of the year in the Street Stock division. In 2000, Barnes Jr. won the Salem Speedway Street Stock Championship with three feature wins, making him the youngest driver in the history of Salem Speedway to win a championship at the age of eighteen.

In 2001, Barnes made his first start in the ASA CRA Super Series, and went on to win the series championship in 2004, winning two races at Shady Bowl Speedway and Nashville Fairgrounds Speedway. Late in the following year, Barnes Jr. would participate in the Race for the Ride at North Wilkesboro Speedway.

In 2006, Barnes made his debut in the ARCA Re/Max Series at Toledo Speedway, driving the No. 35 Chevrolet for TC Motorsports. After starting in sixth, Barnes Jr. went on to win the race, holding off multi-time series champion Frank Kimmel. Barnes Jr. had previously tested for Kimmel's team earlier in the year at Salem. He then attempted two more ARCA races that year, finishing fourth at Salem and failing to qualify for the inaugural race at Iowa Speedway. It was also during this year that he attempted to make his debut in the NASCAR Busch Series at Memphis International Raceway, driving the No. 07 Chevrolet for TC Motorsports, where he ultimately failed to qualify. He then attempted one more ARCA race in 2007, finishing one lap down in eighth at Salem.

After his NASCAR and ARCA career ended, Barnes has since competed in series such as the ASA Southern Super Series, the CRA JEGS All-Stars Tour, and the CRA Street Stock Series.

== Personal life ==
Barnes is the son of fellow racing driver Chuck Barnes Sr., who has competed in series such as the ASA CRA Super Series, the ALL PRO Super Series, the Frank Kimmel Street Stock Nationals, and the CRA Street Stock Series. They, along with Barnes' mother, also own Barnes Auto Services, which opened the same year Barnes was born.

== Motorsports results ==
=== NASCAR ===
(key) (Bold – Pole position awarded by qualifying time. Italics – Pole position earned by points standings or practice time. * – Most laps led.)

==== Busch Series ====
NASCAR Busch Series results
Year	Team	No.	Make	1	2	3	4	5	6	7	8	9	10	11	12	13	14	15	16	17	18	19	20	21	22	23	24	25	26	27	28	29	30	31	32	33	34	35	NBSC	Pts	Ref
2006	TC Motorsports	07	Chevy	DAY	CAL	MXC	LVS	ATL	BRI	TEX	NSH	PHO	TAL	RCH	DAR	CLT	DOV	NSH	KEN	MLW	DAY	CHI	NHA	MAR	GTY	IRP	GLN	MCH	BRI	CAL	RCH	DOV	KAN	CLT	MEM; DNQ	TEX	PHO	HOM	N/A	0	

=== ARCA Re/Max Series ===
(key) (Bold – Pole position awarded by qualifying time. Italics – Pole position earned by points standings or practice time. * – Most laps led.)

ARCA Re/Max Series results
Year	Team	No.	Make	1	2	3	4	5	6	7	8	9	10	11	12	13	14	15	16	17	18	19	20	21	22	23	ARMC	Pts	Ref
2006	TC Motorsports	35	Chevy	DAY	NSH	SLM	WIN	KEN	TOL	POC	MCH	KAN	KEN	BLN	POC	GTW	NSH	MCH	ISF	MIL	TOL; 1	DSF	CHI	SLM; 4	TAL	IOW; DNQ	69th	470	
2007	TC Motorsports	35	Chevy	DAY	USA	NSH	SLM	KAN	WIN	KEN	TOL	IOW	POC	MCH	BLN	KEN	POC	NSH	ISF	MIL	GTW	DSF	CHI	SLM; 8	TAL	TOL	115th	190	
