= Josh Krug =

American racing driver

- Born: January 14, 1986 (age 40); Omaha, Nebraska, U.S.

ARCA Menards Series career
- 30 races run over 3 years
- Best finish: 10th (2007)
- First race: 2005 Harley-Davidson of Cincinnati 150 (Kentucky)
- Last race: 2007 Hantz Group 200 (Toledo)
Wins	Top tens	Poles
0	6	0
- Statistics up to date as of January 12, 2024.

Josh Krug (born January 14, 1986) is an American professional stock car racing and dirt track racing driver who competed in the ARCA Racing Series.

== Racing career ==
Krug began his professional racing career in 2003, driving dirt late models, where he would win several feature races. In the following year, he made the transition to asphalt racing, driving in the ASA Late Model Series, where he won six straight late model races at I-70 Speedway. In October of that year, he was given the opportunity to participate in the Race for the Ride at North Wilkesboro Speedway. Krug was one of the final ten drivers out of four-hundred candidates testing for Roush Racing at North Wilkesboro and Darlington Raceway the following month.

In 2005, Krug announced that he would run a limited schedule in the ASA Late Model Series, along with select starts in the ARCA Re/Max Series after purchasing a car previously owned by A. J. Foyt Racing. He ran the No. 39 Chevrolet for his ARCA debut at Kentucky Speedway, where he would qualify twelfth but finish three laps down in 21st. He made three more starts that year, failing to finish in all of them. He ran another partial schedule in the series in 2006, scoring two top-tens in five starts with a best finish of seventh at Michigan Speedway. He also attempted two NASCAR Busch Series race late into the year, driving the No. 37 Chevrolet for Vision Racing, but failed to qualify at both Richmond International Raceway and Phoenix International Raceway.

In 2007, Krug attempted to run the full ARCA schedule, driving the No. 23 Chevrolet/Pontiac for Hixson Motorsports. After failing to qualify for the season opening race at Daytona International Speedway, Krug made the remaining races on his way to finish tenth in the final points standings with four top-ten finishes with a best result of fifth at the Milwaukee Mile. He also attempted to make the Busch Series race at Kansas Speedway, driving the No. 61 Chevrolet for Brian Carter Racing, where he would ultimately fail to qualify.

After 2007, Krug has since transitioned back to late model and dirt racing, winning three Cornhusker Classic titles at I-80 Speedway.

== Personal life ==
Krug attended the University of Nebraska–Lincoln with a degree in mechanical engineering.

Krug currently works as a product developer at Speedway Motors.

== Motorsports results ==
=== NASCAR ===
(key) (Bold – Pole position awarded by qualifying time. Italics – Pole position earned by points standings or practice time. * – Most laps led.)

==== Busch Series ====
NASCAR Busch Series results
Year	Team	No.	Make	1	2	3	4	5	6	7	8	9	10	11	12	13	14	15	16	17	18	19	20	21	22	23	24	25	26	27	28	29	30	31	32	33	34	35	NBSC	Pts	Ref
2006	Vision Racing	37	Chevy	DAY	CAL	MXC	LVS	ATL	BRI	TEX	NSH	PHO	TAL	RCH	DAR	CLT	DOV	NSH	KEN	MLW	DAY	CHI	NHA	MAR	GTY	IRP	GLN	MCH	BRI	CAL	RCH; DNQ	DOV	KAN	CLT	MEM	TEX	PHO; DNQ	HOM	N/A	0	
2007	Brian Carter Racing	61	Chevy	DAY	CAL	MXC	LVS	ATL	BRI	NSH	TEX	PHO	TAL	RCH	DAR	CLT	DOV	NSH	KEN	MLW	NHA	DAY	CHI	GTY	IRP	CGV	GLN	MCH	BRI	CAL	RCH	DOV	KAN; DNQ	CLT	MEM	TEX	PHO	HOM	N/A	0	

=== ARCA Re/Max Series ===
(key) (Bold – Pole position awarded by qualifying time. Italics – Pole position earned by points standings or practice time. * – Most laps led.)

ARCA Re/Max Series results
Year	Team	No.	Make	1	2	3	4	5	6	7	8	9	10	11	12	13	14	15	16	17	18	19	20	21	22	23	ARMC	Pts	Ref
2005	Pat Krug Racing	39	Chevy	DAY	NSH	SLM	KEN; 21	TOL	LAN	MIL	POC	MCH	KAN; 40	KEN	BLN	POC	GTW	LER	NSH								97th	260	
2005	Pat Krug Racing	74	Chevy																	MCH; 33	ISF	TOL	DSF				97th	260	
2005	Pat Krug Racing	2	Chevy																					CHI; 37	SLM	TAL	97th	260	
2006	Pat Krug Racing	74	Chevy	DAY	NSH; 22	SLM	WIN																				58th	610	
2006	Hixson Motorsports	2	Chevy					KEN; 10	TOL	POC																	58th	610	
2006	Hixson Motorsports	74	Chevy								MCH; 7	KAN; 39	KEN; 30	BLN	POC	GTW	NSH	MCH	ISF	MIL	TOL	DSF	CHI	SLM	TAL	IOW	58th	610	
2007	Hixson Motorsports	23	Chevy	DAY; DNQ	USA; 21	NSH; 21	SLM; 24	KAN; 16		KEN; 13		IOW; 9	POC; 17	MCH; 35	BLN; 10	KEN; 32	POC; 9	NSH; 38	ISF; 25	MIL; 5	GTW; 22	DSF; 12	CHI; 15	SLM; 21	TAL; 23	TOL; 30	10th	4080	
2007	Hixson Motorsports	23	Pontiac						WIN; 18		TOL; 30																10th	4080	
