= Matt McCall (NASCAR) =

American racing driver and crew chief

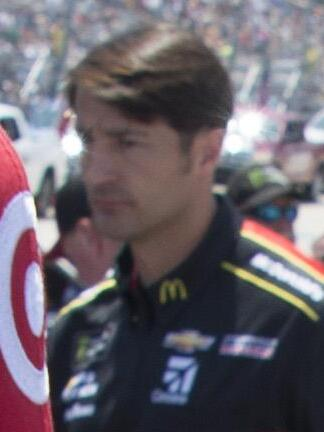
- McCall at Dover Motor Speedway in 2017
- Born: Matthew D. McCall; July 3, 1981 (age 45); Denver, North Carolina, U.S.
- Achievements: 2004 HMS Track Champion; 2005, 2009 UARA-Stars Champion

NASCAR O'Reilly Auto Parts Series career
- 5 races run over 1 year
- Best finish: 79th (2006)
- First race: 2006 Sharpie Mini 300 (Bristol)
- Last race: 2006 Goody's 250 (Martinsville)
Wins	Top tens	Poles
0	0	0

NASCAR FedEx Freight Truck Series career
- 2 races run over 2 years
- 2013 position: 64th
- Best finish: 64th (2013)
- First race: 2003 Advance Auto Parts 200 (Martinsville)
- Last race: 2013 UNOH 200 (Bristol)
Wins	Top tens	Poles
0	0	0
- Statistics up to date as of November 21, 2024.

Matthew D. McCall (born July 3, 1981) is an American professional stock car racing former driver, engineer and crew chief. He currently works for Spire Motorsports as the Cup Series competition director. He previously crew chiefed for Chip Ganassi Racing and RFK Racing and prior to that was an engineer for Richard Childress Racing and a development driver for Yates Racing.

== Racing career ==
McCall began racing at the age of nine, running go-karts. At the age of thirteen, he moved to the adult leagues, collecting over 150 wins, before moving to the World Karting Association Dirt Series. During that time, McCall collected the WKA's Most Improved Driver and Grand National Champion awards.

McCall's major racing debut came in 1999, when began running Super Sport races at Hickory Motor Speedway, finishing fourth in points. The next year, he won Rookie of the Year and Mechanic of the Year awards. He would be runner-up for the track championship the following season. He won six races apiece in 2003 and 2004 and won the track championship the later year. He also made his Craftsman Truck Series debut the next year at Martinsville Speedway, finishing 21st. In 2005, he won the UARA-Stars championship. He also competed in the Roush Racing: Driver X program and was a top-four finalist. He later signed a driver development contract with Yates Racing.

In 2006, McCall made his debut in the ARCA Re/MAX Series at Daytona, where he started and finished second. He also ran five Busch races for Yates, his best finish being a 24th at Bristol Motor Speedway. He was released after the season; he then joined Richard Childress Racing as an engineer, while racing in regional events and graduating from the University of North Carolina at Charlotte in 2003 with a degree in engineering. In 2009, he won a USAR event at Bristol.

In 2013, McCall acted as interim crew chief for Jeff Burton in the Brickyard 400; later in the year he returned to on-track competition, driving the No. 92 Chevrolet for RBR Enterprises in the Camping World Truck Series' UNOH 200 at Bristol, finishing 22nd in the event. After the 2014 season with Richard Childress Racing, he left to become the crew chief for Jamie McMurray starting in 2015. McCall and McMurray made the NASCAR playoffs in 2015, 2016 and 2017 but failed to make it in 2018. With the departure of McMurray after the 2018 season, McCall became the crew chief for Kurt Busch, who took over the No. 1 car for 2019. On July 13, 2019, McCall clinched his first win as crew chief during the Quaker State 400 at Kentucky Speedway.

With CGR closing down and selling its NASCAR team to Trackhouse Racing Team after the 2021 season, McCall moved to RFK Racing to crew chief their No. 6 car, driven by new driver/co-owner Brad Keselowski, in 2022. On March 24, 2022, McCall was suspended for four races and fined US$100,000 for an L2 Penalty during post-race inspection after the 2022 Folds of Honor QuikTrip 500 at Atlanta. The penalty came under Sections 14.1 and 14.5 in the NASCAR Rule Book, both of which pertain to the modification of a single source supplied part. In addition, the No. 6 team was docked 100 driver and owner points and 10 playoff points. Team engineer Josh Sell was announced as Keselowski's crew chief for the 2022 Texas Grand Prix. On April 13, Scott Miller, NASCAR's senior vice president of competition, explained that the repairs No. 6's rear fascia did not meet original specifications, as a critical dimension of the part was altered. On November 7, 2024, McCall announced he would not return to RFK Racing in 2025. Jeremy Bullins, who previously crew chiefed Keselowski at Team Penske, replaced McCall as crew chief of the No. 6 car.

== Motorsports career results ==
=== NASCAR ===
(key) (Bold – Pole position awarded by qualifying time. Italics – Pole position earned by points standings or practice time. * – Most laps led.)

==== Busch Series ====
NASCAR Busch Series results
Year	Team	No.	Make	1	2	3	4	5	6	7	8	9	10	11	12	13	14	15	16	17	18	19	20	21	22	23	24	25	26	27	28	29	30	31	32	33	34	35	NNSC	Pts	Ref
2006	Robert Yates Racing	90	Ford	DAY	CAL	MXC	LVS	ATL	BRI; 24	TEX	NSH; 42	PHO	TAL	RCH	DAR	CLT	DOV; 41	NSH; 34	KEN	MLW	DAY	CHI	NHA	MAR; 26	GTY	IRP	GLN	MCH	BRI	CAL	RCH	DOV	KAN	CLT	MEM	TEX	PHO	HOM	79th	314	
2007	Roush Fenway Racing	60	Ford	DAY	CAL	MXC	LVS	ATL	BRI	NSH	TEX	PHO	TAL	RCH	DAR	CLT	DOV	NSH	KEN	MLW	NHA	DAY	CHI	GTY	IRP	CGV	GLN	MCH	BRI	CAL	RCH	DOV	KAN	CLT	MEM; QL^{†}	TEX	PHO	HOM	NA	-	
^{†} - Qualified for Carl Edwards

==== Camping World Truck Series ====
NASCAR Camping World Truck Series results
Year	Team	No.	Make	1	2	3	4	5	6	7	8	9	10	11	12	13	14	15	16	17	18	19	20	21	22	23	24	25	NCWTC	Pts	Ref
2003	McCall Motorsports	56	Chevy	DAY	DAR	MMR	MAR	CLT	DOV	TEX	MEM	MLW	KAN	KEN	GTW	MCH	IRP	NSH	BRI	RCH	NHA	CAL	LVS	SBO	TEX	MAR; 21	PHO	HOM	105th	100	
2013	RBR Enterprises	92	Chevy	DAY	MAR	CAR	KAN	CLT	DOV	TEX	KEN	IOW	ELD	POC	MCH	BRI; 22	MSP	IOW	CHI	LVS	TAL	MAR	TEX	PHO	HOM				64th	22	

^{*} Season still in progress
^{1} Ineligible for series points

=== ARCA Re/Max Series ===
(key) (Bold – Pole position awarded by qualifying time. Italics – Pole position earned by points standings or practice time. * – Most laps led.)

ARCA Re/Max Series results
Year	Team	No.	Make	1	2	3	4	5	6	7	8	9	10	11	12	13	14	15	16	17	18	19	20	21	22	23	ARMC	Pts	Ref
2006	Robert Yates Racing	55	Ford	DAY; 2	NSH	SLM	WIN	KEN; 3	TOL	POC	MCH	KAN	KEN	BLN	POC	GTW	NSH	MCH	ISF	MIL	TOL	DSF	CHI	SLM	TAL	IOW	71st	445	
