= Justin Diercks =

American stock car racing driver

- Born: April 4, 1980 (age 46); Davenport, Iowa, U.S.
- Achievements: 2004, 2005 NASCAR Midwest Series Champion

NASCAR O'Reilly Auto Parts Series career
- 14 races run over 2 years
- Best finish: 73rd (2007)
- First race: 2006 Circuit City 250 (Richmond)
- Last race: 2007 Meijer 300 (Kentucky)
Wins	Top tens	Poles
0	0	0
- Statistics up to date as of January 15, 2012.

Justin Diercks (born April 4, 1980) is an American professional stock car racing driver. He previously drove the No. 70 car for ML Motorsports. He made his Busch Series debut in 2006 in the Circuit City 250 at Richmond International Raceway. He made a total of seven Busch Series starts in 2006 with a best finish of 28th. He attempted four more races but failed to qualify for them. Diercks returned to the team in 2007, running an additional seven races. On June 29, 2007, Diercks and ML Motorsports mutually agreed to part ways. They had a best finish of 22nd at the beginning of the 2007 season.

== Motorsports career results ==
=== NASCAR ===
(key) (Bold – Pole position awarded by qualifying time. Italics – Pole position earned by points standings or practice time. * – Most laps led.)

==== Busch Series ====
NASCAR Busch Series results
Year	Team	No.	Make	1	2	3	4	5	6	7	8	9	10	11	12	13	14	15	16	17	18	19	20	21	22	23	24	25	26	27	28	29	30	31	32	33	34	35	NBSC	Pts	Ref
2006	ML Motorsports	70	Chevy	DAY	CAL	MXC	LVS	ATL	BRI	TEX	NSH	PHO	TAL	RCH; 43	DAR	CLT	DOV	NSH; 32	KEN; 33	MLW	DAY	CHI; DNQ	NHA	MAR	GTY; 28	IRP; 31	GLN	MCH	BRI	CAL	RCH; DNQ	DOV	KAN; 32	CLT	MEM; 30	TEX; DNQ	PHO	HOM; DNQ	80th	311	
2007	ML Motorsports	70	Chevy	DAY; DNQ	CAL	MXC	LVS; 22	ATL	BRI	NSH; 24	TEX; 24	PHO	TAL; 40	RCH; 28	DAR	CLT	DOV	NSH; 43	KEN; 31	MLW	NHA	DAY	CHI	GTY	IRP	CGV	GLN	MCH	BRI	CAL	RCH	DOV	KAN	CLT	MEM	TEX	PHO	HOM	73rd	505	

=== ARCA Re/Max Series ===
(key) (Bold – Pole position awarded by qualifying time. Italics – Pole position earned by points standings or practice time. * – Most laps led.)

ARCA Re/Max Series results
Year	Team	No.	Make	1	2	3	4	5	6	7	8	9	10	11	12	13	14	15	16	17	18	19	20	21	22	23	ARMC	Pts	Ref
2006	ML Motorsports	70	Chevy	DAY; 26	NSH; 35	SLM	WIN																		TAL; 35	IOW; 34	74th	435	
2006	ML Motorsports	70	Ford					KEN; 15	TOL	POC	MCH	KAN	KEN	BLN	POC	GTW	NSH	MCH	ISF	MIL	TOL	DSF	CHI	SLM			74th	435	

Sporting positions
Preceded by Steve Carlson	NASCAR International Truck & Engine Midwest Series Champion; 2004, 2005	Succeeded by Tim Schendel
