= Auggie Vidovich =

American racing driver (born 1981)

- Born: August Louis Vidovich II; February 20, 1981 (age 45); Lakeside, California, U.S.
- Achievements: 2003 NASCAR AutoZone Elite Division, Southwest Series champion

NASCAR O'Reilly Auto Parts Series career
- 21 races run over 1 year
- 2006 position: 33rd
- Best finish: 33rd (2006)
- First race: 2006 StonebridgeRacing.com 200 (Dover)
- Last race: 2006 Ford 300 (Homestead)
Wins	Top tens	Poles
0	0	0

NASCAR FedEx Freight Truck Series career
- 4 races run over 4 years
- 2006 position: 75th
- Best finish: 62nd (1999)
- First race: 1998 Dodge California Truck Stop 300 (Mesa Marin)
- Last race: 2006 City of Mansfield 250 (Mansfield)
Wins	Top tens	Poles
0	0	0
- Statistics up to date as of September 4, 2020.

August Louis Vidovich II (born February 20, 1981) is an American professional stock car racing driver.

== Racing career ==
Vidovich was born in Lakeside, California. Vidovich has competed in the Elite Division Southwest Series for several years. He had a NASCAR Craftsman Truck Series start in 1998 and two starts in 1999. He won the Southwest Series championship in 2003, and finished second in 2000, 2001, and 2005. In 2005, Vidovich won the Toyota All-Star Challenge. At the end of that season, Vidovich tried out for Roush Racing's Truck Series team in the team's TV show on the Discovery Channel, Roush Racing: Driver X, but was not selected. However, in the spring of 2006, Roush did decide to hire Vidovich to run one Truck race in place of David Ragan. Midway through the 2006 season, he was signed to pilot the No. 4 GEICO Dodge Charger for the Biagi Brothers in the Busch Series, and recorded a best finish of 15th at the Milwaukee Mile. He raced in 21 of 35 events and finished 33rd in the standings. In 2007, Vidovich was to have remained with Biagi running full-time and the team switching from Dodge to Toyota, but the team shut down in January of that year due to lack of sponsorship after GEICO left for Phoenix Racing's No. 7 car of Mike Wallace. He raced in one NASCAR Camping World West Series race in 2008. In 2009, Vidovich qualified Carl Edwards' No. 60 car for Roush in the now-O'Reilly Auto Parts Series in a number of the standalone races when Edwards was at whatever track the Cup Series was racing at that weekend. In 2010, Vidovich raced in four West races; he won the Irwindale Speedway race and finished fourth at Phoenix International Raceway. These were his last NASCAR starts.

== Motorsports career results ==
=== NASCAR ===
(key) (Bold – Pole position awarded by qualifying time. Italics – Pole position earned by points standings or practice time. * – Most laps led.)

==== Nationwide Series ====
NASCAR Nationwide Series results
Year	Team	No.	Make	1	2	3	4	5	6	7	8	9	10	11	12	13	14	15	16	17	18	19	20	21	22	23	24	25	26	27	28	29	30	31	32	33	34	35	NBSC	Pts	Ref
2006	Biagi-DenBeste Racing	4	Dodge	DAY	CAL	MXC	LVS	ATL	BRI	TEX	NSH	PHO	TAL	RCH	DAR	CLT	DOV; 29	NSH; 33	KEN; 34	MLW; 15	DAY	CHI; 32	NHA; 28	MAR; 25	GTY; 21	IRP; 34	GLN; 21	MCH; 38	BRI; 32	CAL; 43	RCH; 27	DOV; 27	KAN; 20	CLT; 33	MEM; 15	TEX; 38	PHO; 33	HOM; 32	33rd	1628	
2007	Roush Fenway Racing	6	Ford	DAY	CAL	MXC	LVS	ATL	BRI	NSH	TEX	PHO	TAL	RCH	DAR	CLT	DOV	NSH	KEN	MLW	NHA	DAY	CHI	GTY	IRP	CGV	GLN	MCH	BRI	CAL	RCH	DOV	KAN	CLT	MEM; QL^{†}	TEX	PHO	HOM	N/A	0	
2008	Roush Fenway Racing	6	Ford	DAY	CAL	LVS	ATL	BRI	NSH	TEX	PHO	MXC	TAL	RCH	DAR	CLT	DOV	NSH	KEN	MLW; QL^{†}	NHA	DAY	CHI	GTY	IRP	CGV	GLN	MCH	BRI	CAL	RCH	DOV	KAN	CLT	MEM; QL^{†}	TEX	PHO	HOM	N/A	0	
2009	Roush Fenway Racing	60	Ford	DAY	CAL	LVS	BRI	TEX	NSH	PHO	TAL	RCH	DAR	CLT	DOV	NSH	KEN	MLW	NHA	DAY	CHI	GTY	IRP	IOW; QL^{‡}	GLN	MCH	BRI	CGV	ATL	RCH	DOV	KAN	CAL	CLT	MEM; QL^{‡}	TEX	PHO	HOM	N/A	0	
^{†} – Qualified for David Ragan · ^{‡} – Qualified for Carl Edwards

==== Craftsman Truck Series ====
NASCAR Craftsman Truck Series results
Year	Team	No.	Make	1	2	3	4	5	6	7	8	9	10	11	12	13	14	15	16	17	18	19	20	21	22	23	24	25	26	27	NCTC	Pts	Ref
1998	Auggie Vidovich	5	Ford	WDW	HOM	PHO	POR	EVG	I70	GLN	TEX	BRI	MLW	NZH	CAL	PPR	IRP	NHA	FLM	NSV	HPT	LVL	RCH	MEM	GTY	MAR	SON	MMR; 25	PHO	LVS	95th	88	
1999	Auggie Vidovich	5	Ford	HOM	PHO	EVG	MMR; 30	MAR	MEM	PPR	I70	BRI	TEX	PIR; 22	GLN	MLW	NSV	NZH	MCH	NHA	IRP	GTY	HPT	RCH	LVS; DNQ	LVL	TEX	CAL			62nd	222	
2001	Jim Mills	70	Chevy	DAY	HOM	MMR	MAR	GTY	DAR	PPR	DOV	TEX	MEM	MLW	KAN	KEN	NHA	IRP	NSH	CIC	NZH	RCH	SBO	TEX	LVS	PHO; DNQ	CAL				N/A	0	
2006	Roush Racing	6	Ford	DAY	CAL	ATL	MAR	GTY	CLT	MFD; 19	DOV	TEX	MCH	MLW	KAN	KEN	MEM	IRP	NSH	BRI	NHA	LVS	TAL	MAR	ATL	TEX	PHO	HOM			75th	106	

==== K&N Pro Series West ====
NASCAR K&N Pro Series West results
Year	Team	No.	Make	1	2	3	4	5	6	7	8	9	10	11	12	13	14	NKNPSWC	Pts	Ref
2001	Info not available	59	Chevy	PHO	LVS	TUS	MMR	CAL	IRW	LAG	KAN	EVG	CNS	IRW	RMR	LVS; 16	IRW	51st	115	
2006	Biagi-DenBeste Racing	57	Ford	PHO	PHO; 24	S99	IRW	SON	DCS	IRW	EVG	S99	**CAL**; 29*	CTS	AMP			44th	172	
2008	Viva Motorsports	84	Chevy	AAS	PHO	CTS	IOW	CNS	SON	IRW	DCS	EVG	MMP	IRW	AMP; 23	AAS		69th	94	
2010	James Cass	50	Chevy	AAS; 21	PHO; 14	IOW	DCS											22nd	620	
2010	James Cass	59	Chevy						IRW; 1*	PIR	MRP	CNS	MMP	AAS				22nd	620	
2010	Steve McGowan Motorsports	19	Chevy					SON; DNQ							PHO; 4			22nd	620	

Sporting positions
Preceded by Eddy McKean	NASCAR AutoZone Elite Division, Southwest Series Champion; 2003	Succeeded by Jim Pettit II
