= 2006 NASCAR Busch Series =

American motorsport season

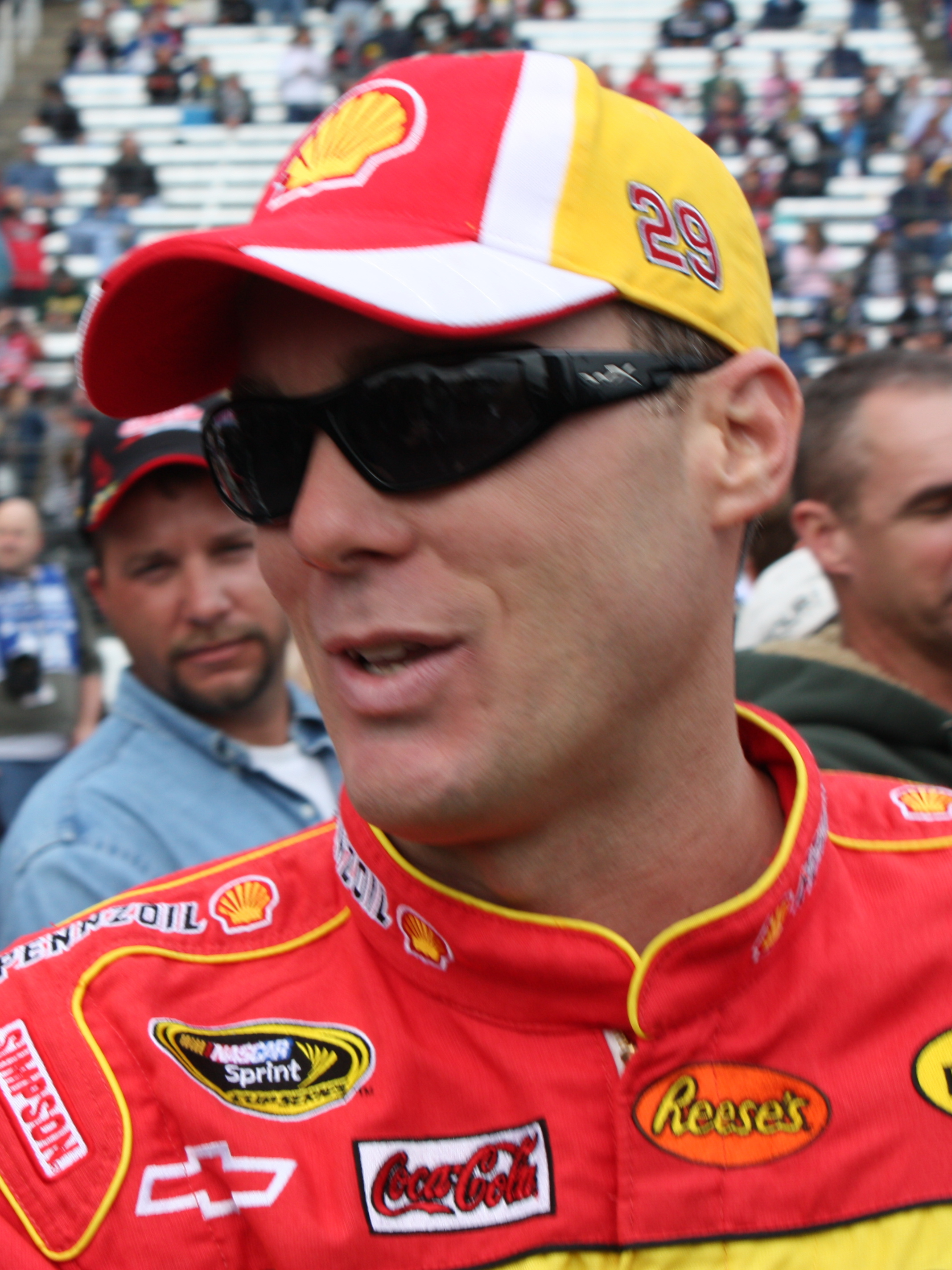
Kevin Harvick, pictured in 2010, the 2006 Busch Series champion

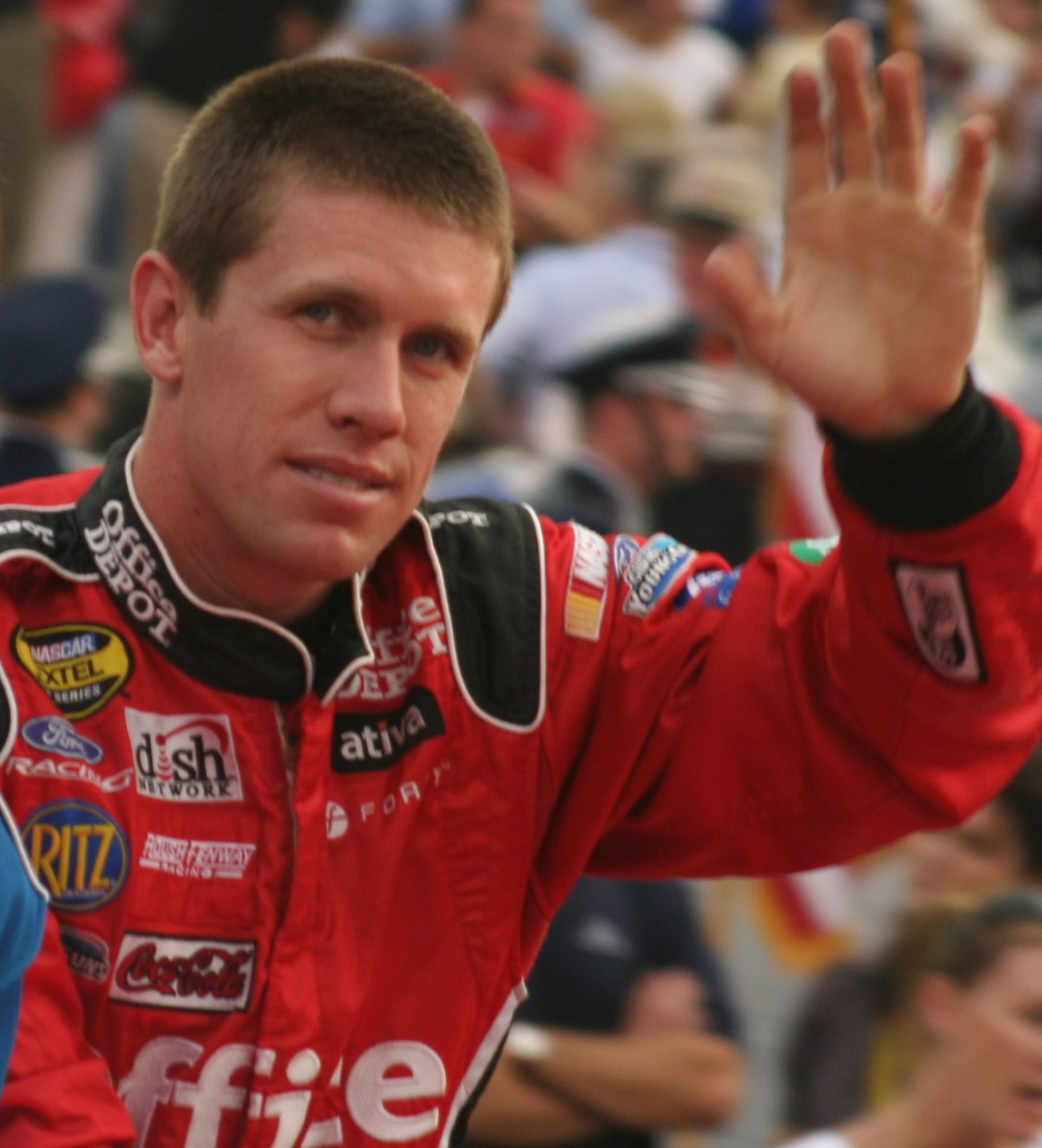
Carl Edwards, pictured in 2007, finished second in the standings.

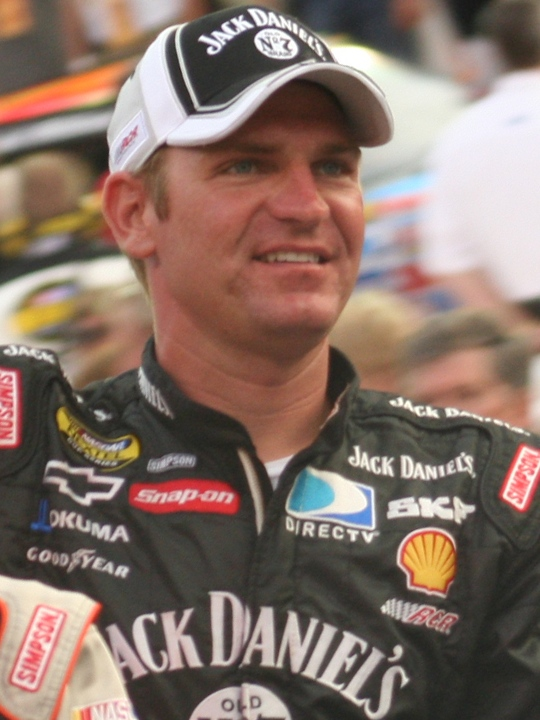
Clint Bowyer, pictured in 2007, finished third in the standings.

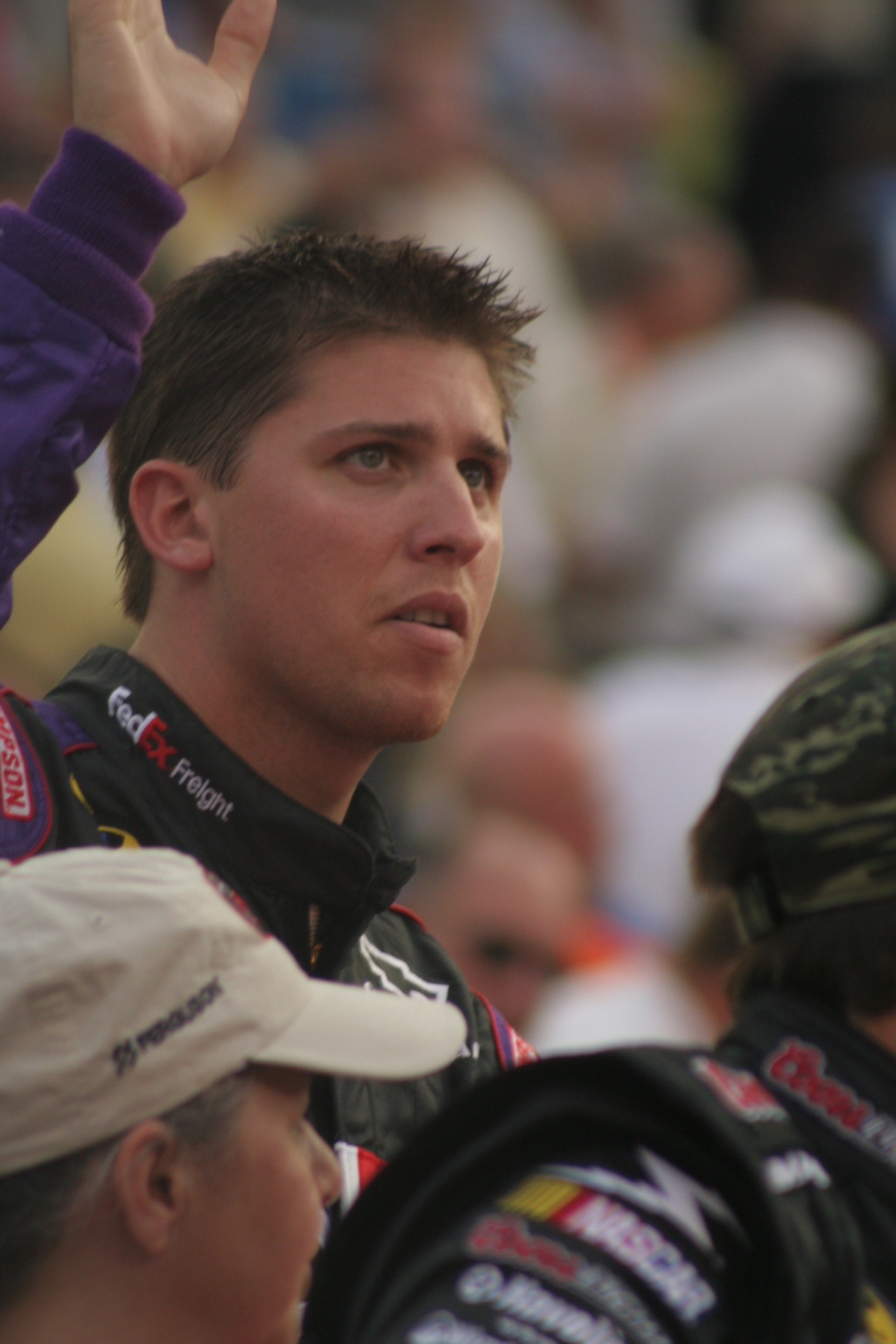
Denny Hamlin, pictured in 2007, finished fourth in the standings.

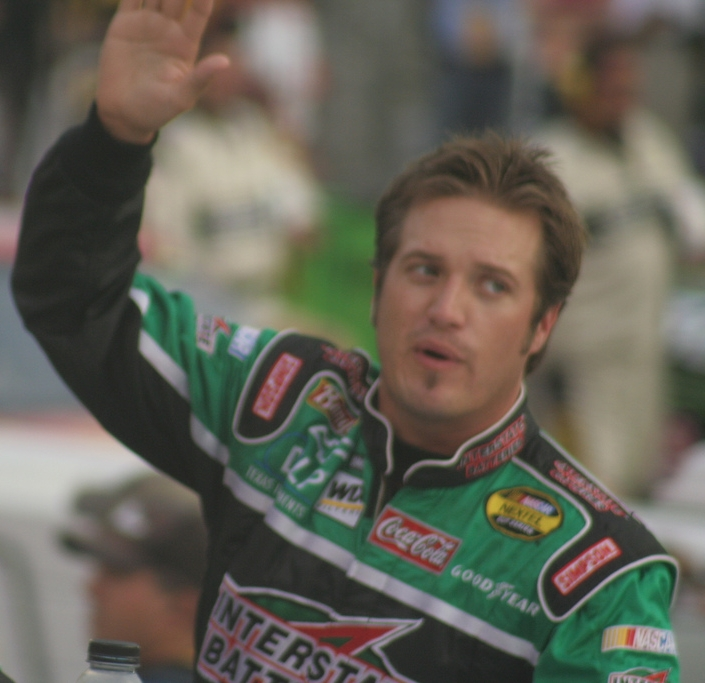
J. J. Yeley, pictured in 2007, finished fifth in the standings.

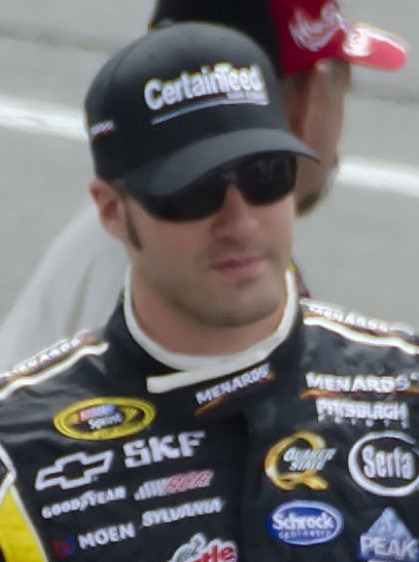
Paul Menard, pictured in 2011, who finished sixth in points, was the highest-finishing series regular in the standings.

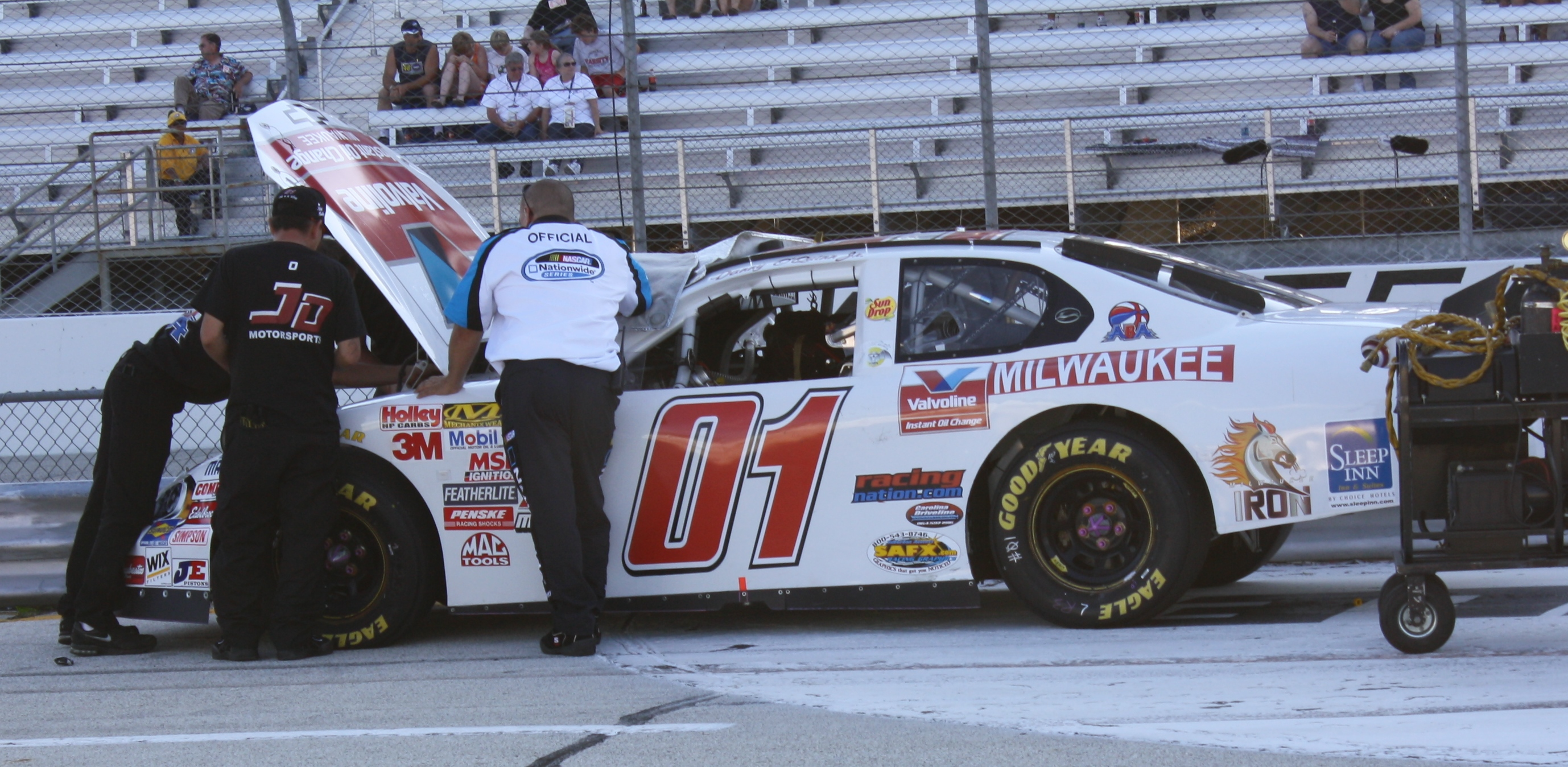
Danny O'Quinn Jr., 2009 car shown, won Rookie of the Year.

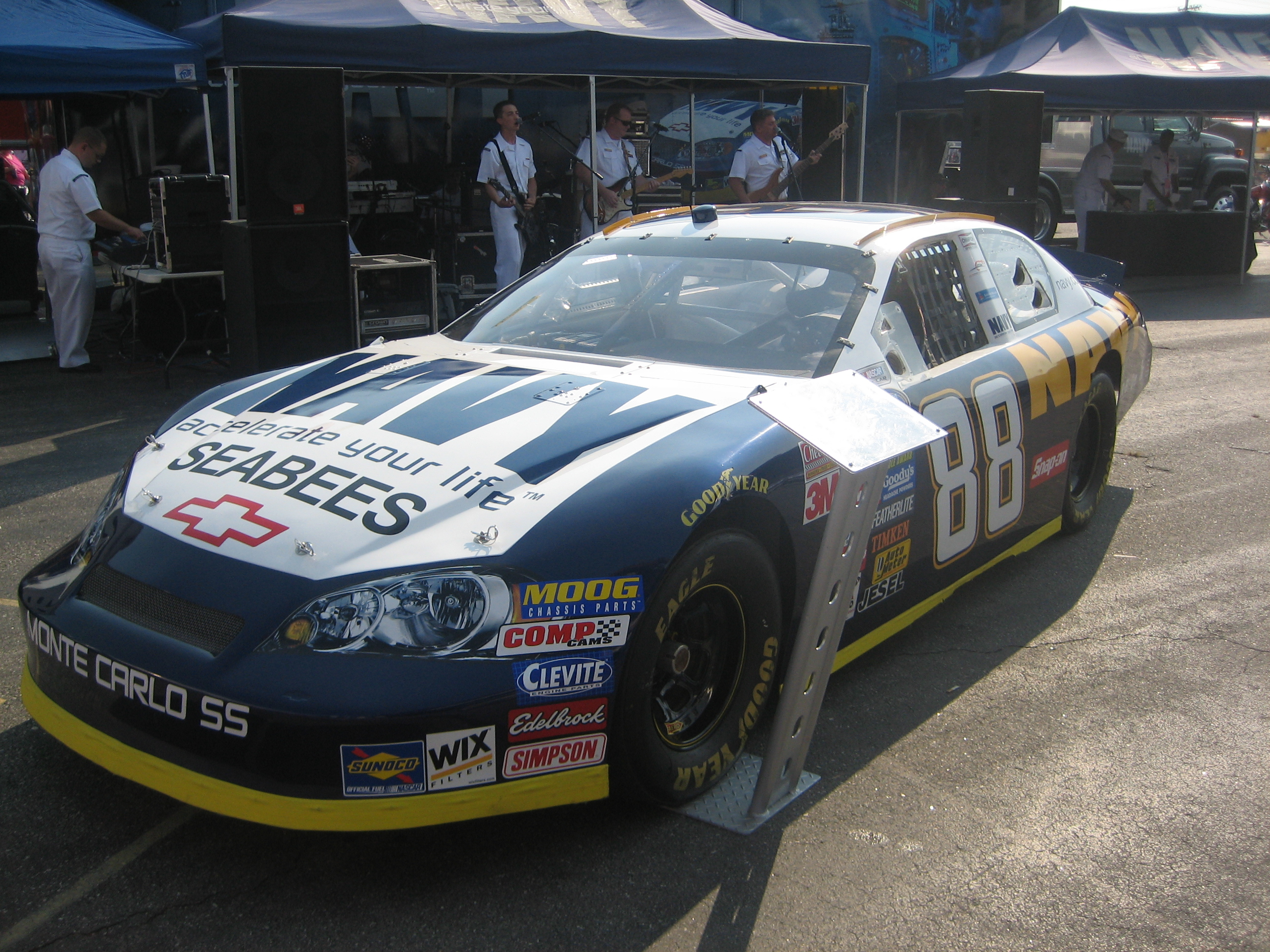
Chevy, 2007 car shown, won the manufacturer's championship.

The 2006 NASCAR Busch Series opened on February 18, 2006, at Daytona International Speedway, and concluded on November 18, 2006, at Homestead-Miami Speedway. Kevin Harvick, driving for his own team, Kevin Harvick, Inc., as well as for Richard Childress Racing, was declared champion.

This was the Final Season that Fox Sports/FX, TNT, and NBC covered the Busch Series. Starting in 2007, as part of a new TV contract with the television networks of The Walt Disney Company, ESPN2 televised the entire Busch season with select races on ABC.

== Invasion of the "Busch Whackers" ==
There has been some controversy of the use of NEXTEL Cup teams with their drivers in Busch Series races, most notably at NEXTEL Cup tracks where there are Busch Series support races. This has been dubbed by Fox Sports announcer Mike Joy as "Busch Whacking", and many underfunded (or one-car) teams have failed to qualify for these races because of this. Out of the 35 races that were run in the 2006 Busch Series season, 33 of those races were won by NEXTEL Cup Series drivers. The only 2 non-NEXTEL Cup Series drivers that won Busch Series races in 2006 were David Gilliland at Kentucky and Paul Menard at Milwaukee. The 2006 season has been notable for those "double duty" drivers even traveling to sites where there are stand-alone races at Nashville Superspeedway, Kentucky Speedway, Autódromo Hermanos Rodriguez and The Milwaukee Mile just to name a few, even on the rare weeks where there are no NEXTEL Cup races. Kentucky was the big upset where one of the underfunded one-car teams (Gilliland's No.84 entry) took advantage and pulled off the big upset.

In the end, Kevin Harvick, who at the time drove for Richard Childress Racing in the Cup series, won the 2006 championship on October 13, the second of his career having previously won in 2001 (when the death of Dale Earnhardt forced him into doing double-duty between the Busch and then-Winston Cup series; he won Cup Rookie of the Year to go with his Busch title in 2001). After Harvick won the title, talk began about limiting the number of "Busch Whackers" (Cup drivers) in each race or capping the double-dippers appearances for the entire season or even having a "Chase for the NEXTEL Cup" playoff system in place for the 2007 season since Harvick was so dominant during 2006 as NEXTEL Cup drivers won every race but two in the season. Ultimately, no changes were made until 2011, where NASCAR announced that Cup drivers could only run for points in one series. A limit over the number of races Cup drivers could run was not put into effect until over a decade later in 2017. The Busch/Nationwide/Xfinity Series did not have a playoffs ("Chase") until 2016, ten years later.

== Schedule ==
| No. | Race title | Track | Date |
|---|---|---|---|
| 1 | Hershey's Kissables 300 | Daytona International Speedway, Daytona Beach, Florida | February 18 |
| 2 | Stater Bros. 300 | California Speedway, Fontana, California | February 25 |
| 3 | Telcel-Motorola 200 | Autódromo Hermanos Rodríguez, Mexico City, Mexico | March 5 |
| 4 | Sam's Town 300 | Las Vegas Motor Speedway, Las Vegas, Nevada | March 11 |
| 5 | Nicorette 300 | Atlanta Motor Speedway, Hampton, Georgia | March 18 |
| 6 | Sharpie Mini 300 | Bristol Motor Speedway, Bristol, Tennessee | March 25 |
| 7 | O'Reilly 300 | Texas Motor Speedway, Fort Worth, Texas | April 8 |
| 8 | Pepsi 300 | Nashville Superspeedway, Gladeville, Tennessee | April 15 |
| 9 | Bashas' Supermarkets 200 | Phoenix International Raceway, Avondale, Arizona | April 21 |
| 10 | Aaron's 312 | Talladega Superspeedway, Talladega, Alabama | April 29 |
| 11 | Circuit City 250 presented by FUNAI | Richmond International Raceway, Richmond, Virginia | May 5 |
| 12 | Diamond Hill Plywood 200 | Darlington Raceway, Darlington, South Carolina | May 12 |
| 13 | Carquest Auto Parts 300 | Lowe's Motor Speedway, Concord, North Carolina | May 26 |
| 14 | StonebridgeRacing.com 200 | Dover International Speedway, Dover, Delaware | June 3 |
| 15 | Federated Auto Parts 300 | Nashville Superspeedway, Gladeville, Tennessee | June 10 |
| 16 | Meijer 300 presented by Oreo | Kentucky Speedway, Sparta, Kentucky | June 17 |
| 17 | AT&T 250 | Milwaukee Mile, West Allis, Wisconsin | June 24 |
| 18 | Winn-Dixie 250 presented by PepsiCo | Daytona International Speedway, Daytona Beach, Florida | June 30 |
| 19 | USG Durock 300 | Chicagoland Speedway, Joliet, Illinois | July 8 |
| 20 | New England 200 | New Hampshire International Speedway, Loudon, New Hampshire | July 15 |
| 21 | Goody's 250 | Martinsville Speedway, Ridgeway | July 22 |
| 22 | Busch Silver Celebration 250 presented by Shop 'n Save | Gateway International Raceway, Madison, Illinois | July 29 |
| 23 | Kroger 200 benefiting Riley Hospital for Children | O'Reilly Raceway Park, Brownsburg, Indiana | August 5 |
| 24 | Zippo 200 | Watkins Glen International, Watkins Glen, New York | August 12 |
| 25 | Carfax 250 | Michigan International Speedway, Brooklyn, Michigan | August 19 |
| 26 | Food City 250 | Bristol Motor Speedway, Bristol, Tennessee | August 25 |
| 27 | Ameriquest 300 | California Speedway, Fontana, California | September 2 |
| 28 | Emerson Radio 250 | Richmond International Raceway, Richmond, Virginia | September 8 |
| 29 | Dover 200 | Dover International Speedway, Dover, Delaware | September 23 |
| 30 | Yellow Transportation 300 | Kansas Speedway, Kansas City, Kansas | September 30 |
| 31 | Dollar General 300 | Lowe's Motor Speedway, Concord, North Carolina | October 13 |
| 32 | Sam's Town 250 | Memphis Motorsports Park, Millington, Tennessee | October 28 |
| 33 | O'Reilly Challenge | Texas Motor Speedway, Fort Worth, Texas | November 4 |
| 34 | Arizona.Travel 200 | Phoenix International Raceway, Avondale, Arizona | November 11 |
| 35 | Ford 300 | Homestead-Miami Speedway, Homestead, Florida | November 18 |

== Teams and drivers ==
=== Complete schedule ===
| Manufacturer | Team | No. | Driver | Crew chief |
|---|---|---|---|---|
| Chevrolet | Dale Earnhardt, Inc. | 11 | Paul Menard | Dan Stillman |
| Chevrolet | Davis Motorsports | 0 | Kertus Davis 26 | Adam Risher |
| Chevrolet | Davis Motorsports | 0 | Randy LaJoie 1 | Adam Risher |
| Chevrolet | Davis Motorsports | 0 | Morgan Shepherd 6 | Adam Risher |
| Chevrolet | Davis Motorsports | 0 | P. J. Jones 1 | Adam Risher |
| Chevrolet | Davis Motorsports | 0 | Chris Wimmer 1 | Adam Risher |
| Chevrolet | Duesenberg & Leik Motorsports | 01 | Jay Sauter | Fred Wanke |
| Chevrolet | Haas CNC Racing | 00 | Johnny Sauter | Harold Holly 31; Bootie Barker 4 |
| Chevrolet | Hendrick Motorsports | 5 | Kyle Busch 34 | Chad Walter |
| Chevrolet | Hendrick Motorsports | 5 | Justin Labonte 1 | Chad Walter |
| Chevrolet | Joe Gibbs Racing | 18 | J. J. Yeley | Jason Ratcliff |
| Chevrolet | Joe Gibbs Racing | 20 | Denny Hamlin | Dave Rogers |
| Chevrolet | JR Motorsports | 88 | Mark McFarland (R) 21 | Richard Hubbs; Wes Ward |
| Chevrolet | JR Motorsports | 88 | Martin Truex Jr. 3 | Richard Hubbs; Wes Ward |
| Chevrolet | JR Motorsports | 88 | Robby Gordon 2 | Richard Hubbs; Wes Ward |
| Chevrolet | JR Motorsports | 88 | Shane Huffman 9 | Richard Hubbs; Wes Ward |
| Chevrolet | Kevin Harvick, Inc. | 33 | Tony Stewart 10 | Wally Rogers; Charlie Wilson |
| Chevrolet | Kevin Harvick, Inc. | 33 | Kevin Harvick 4 | Wally Rogers; Charlie Wilson |
| Chevrolet | Kevin Harvick, Inc. | 33 | Ron Fellows 2 | Wally Rogers; Charlie Wilson |
| Chevrolet | Kevin Harvick, Inc. | 33 | Ron Hornaday Jr. 14 | Wally Rogers; Charlie Wilson |
| Chevrolet | Kevin Harvick, Inc. | 33 | Aaron Fike 3 | Wally Rogers; Charlie Wilson |
| Chevrolet | Kevin Harvick, Inc. | 33 | Sean Caisse 1 | Wally Rogers; Charlie Wilson |
| Chevrolet | Kevin Harvick, Inc. | 33 | Cale Gale 1 | Wally Rogers; Charlie Wilson |
| Chevrolet | Kevin Harvick, Inc. | 77 | Burney Lamar (R) 29 | Gene Nead; Stacy Johnson; Dana Brugman |
| Chevrolet | Kevin Harvick, Inc. | 77 | Jeff Burton 1 | Gene Nead; Stacy Johnson; Dana Brugman |
| Chevrolet | Kevin Harvick, Inc. | 77 | Bobby Labonte 5 | Gene Nead; Stacy Johnson; Dana Brugman |
| Chevrolet | McGill Motorsports | 36 | Tim Sauter 29 | Ricky Pearson |
| Chevrolet | McGill Motorsports | 36 | Max Papis 2 | Ricky Pearson |
| Chevrolet | McGill Motorsports | 36 | Jeff Green 1 | Ricky Pearson |
| Chevrolet | McGill Motorsports | 36 | Stanton Barrett 1 | Ricky Pearson |
| Chevrolet | McGill Motorsports | 36 | Brent Sherman 2 | Ricky Pearson |
| Chevrolet | Richard Childress Racing | 2 | Clint Bowyer | Dan Deeringhoff |
| Chevrolet | Richard Childress Racing | 21 | Jeff Burton 5 | Pat Smith; Shane Wilson; Todd Berrier 4 |
| Chevrolet | Richard Childress Racing | 21 | Kevin Harvick 30 | Pat Smith; Shane Wilson; Todd Berrier 4 |
| Dodge | Biagi Brothers Racing | 4 | Mark Green 11 | Jon Wolfe 24; Mike Harvick 11 |
| Dodge | Biagi Brothers Racing | 4 | Paul Tracy 1 | Jon Wolfe 24; Mike Harvick 11 |
| Dodge | Biagi Brothers Racing | 4 | Boris Said 1 | Jon Wolfe 24; Mike Harvick 11 |
| Dodge | Biagi Brothers Racing | 4 | Auggie Vidovich 21 | Jon Wolfe 24; Mike Harvick 11 |
| Dodge | Biagi Brothers Racing | 4 | Kevin Hamlin 1 | Jon Wolfe 24; Mike Harvick 11 |
| Dodge | Chip Ganassi Racing | 41 | Reed Sorenson 34 | Brian Pattie |
| Dodge | Chip Ganassi Racing | 41 | David Stremme 1 | Brian Pattie |
| Dodge | Evernham Motorsports | 9 | Kasey Kahne 17 | Trip Bruce |
| Dodge | Evernham Motorsports | 9 | Jeremy Mayfield 1 | Trip Bruce |
| Dodge | Evernham Motorsports | 9 | Boris Said 5 | Trip Bruce |
| Dodge | Evernham Motorsports | 9 | Scott Riggs 7 | Trip Bruce |
| Dodge | Evernham Motorsports | 9 | Erin Crocker 5 | Trip Bruce |
| Dodge | FitzBradshaw Racing | 12 | David Reutimann 1 | Paul Wolfe |
| Dodge | FitzBradshaw Racing | 12 | Joel Kauffman (R) 13 | Paul Wolfe |
| Dodge | FitzBradshaw Racing | 12 | Tracy Hines (R) 4 | Paul Wolfe |
| Dodge | FitzBradshaw Racing | 12 | Mike Skinner 10 | Paul Wolfe |
| Dodge | FitzBradshaw Racing | 12 | Carlos Contreras 4 | Paul Wolfe |
| Dodge | FitzBradshaw Racing | 12 | Kevin Hamlin 1 | Paul Wolfe |
| Dodge | FitzBradshaw Racing | 12 | Scott Wimmer 1 | Paul Wolfe |
| Dodge | FitzBradshaw Racing | 12 | Ted Musgrave 1 | Paul Wolfe |
| Dodge | Rusty Wallace, Inc. | 64 | Steve Wallace 15 | Bryant Frazier |
| Dodge | Rusty Wallace, Inc. | 64 | Jamie McMurray 20 | Bryant Frazier |
| Ford | Brewco Motorsports | 27 | David Green 27 | Stewart Cooper |
| Ford | Brewco Motorsports | 27 | Casey Atwood 8 | Stewart Cooper |
| Ford | Wood Brothers/JTG Racing | 47 | Jon Wood | Jay Guy 23; Jerry Pitts 7 David Hyder 5 |
| Ford | Wood Brothers/JTG Racing | 59 | Stacy Compton | Ernie Cope 23; Jay Guy 11 |
| Ford | ppc Racing | 10 | John Andretti (R) | Rick Gay 24; Steve Plattenberger 11 |
| Ford | ppc Racing | 22 | Kenny Wallace | Randy Cox 18; Todd Gordon 17 |
| Ford | Robert Yates Racing | 90 | Elliott Sadler 7 | Raymond Fox 22; Skip Eyler 3 Jerry Pitts 4 Cully Barraclough 7 |
| Ford | Robert Yates Racing | 90 | Marc Goossens 1 | Raymond Fox 22; Skip Eyler 3 Jerry Pitts 4 Cully Barraclough 7 |
| Ford | Robert Yates Racing | 90 | Stephen Leicht 20 | Raymond Fox 22; Skip Eyler 3 Jerry Pitts 4 Cully Barraclough 7 |
| Ford | Robert Yates Racing | 90 | Matt McCall 5 | Raymond Fox 22; Skip Eyler 3 Jerry Pitts 4 Cully Barraclough 7 |
| Ford | Robert Yates Racing | 90 | David Gilliland 2 | Raymond Fox 22; Skip Eyler 3 Jerry Pitts 4 Cully Barraclough 7 |
| Ford | Roush Racing | 06 | Todd Kluever (R) | Mike Kelley |
| Ford | Roush Racing | 50 | Danny O'Quinn Jr. (R) 33 | Drew Blickensderfer |
| Ford | Roush Racing | 50 | David Ragan 2 | Drew Blickensderfer |
| Ford | Roush Racing | 60 | Carl Edwards | Pierre Kuettel |
| Ford | Team Rensi Motorsports | 25 | Ashton Lewis | Charlie Lewis 12; Todd Brewer 23 |
| Ford | Team Rensi Motorsports | 35 | Regan Smith | Chris Wright |
| Dodge Ford | Brewco Motorsports 34; Michael Waltrip Racing 1 (Note: Michael Waltrip Racing fielded the No. 99 Dodge in all races and Brewco Motorsports fielded the No. 66 Ford in all races, except at Nashville (Race 8), where they swept their entries for one-race deal. So, at Nashville (Race 8), Michael Waltrip Racing fielded the No. 66 Dodge for David Reutimann while Brewco Motorsports fielded the No. 99 Ford for Michael Waltrip.) | | | |
| Dodge Ford | Brewco Motorsports 34; Michael Waltrip Racing 1 | 66 | Ken Schrader 8 | Newt Moore 34; Cully Barraclough 1 |
| Dodge Ford | Brewco Motorsports 34; Michael Waltrip Racing 1 | 66 | Scott Wimmer 16 | Newt Moore 34; Cully Barraclough 1 |
| Dodge Ford | Brewco Motorsports 34; Michael Waltrip Racing 1 | 66 | Jorge Goeters (R) 1 | Newt Moore 34; Cully Barraclough 1 |
| Dodge Ford | Brewco Motorsports 34; Michael Waltrip Racing 1 | 66 | David Reutimann 1 | Newt Moore 34; Cully Barraclough 1 |
| Dodge Ford | Brewco Motorsports 34; Michael Waltrip Racing 1 | 66 | Greg Biffle 4 | Newt Moore 34; Cully Barraclough 1 |
| Dodge Ford | Brewco Motorsports 34; Michael Waltrip Racing 1 | 66 | Bobby Labonte 2 | Newt Moore 34; Cully Barraclough 1 |
| Dodge Ford | Brewco Motorsports 34; Michael Waltrip Racing 1 | 66 | Jason Keller 2 | Newt Moore 34; Cully Barraclough 1 |
| Dodge Ford | Brewco Motorsports 34; Michael Waltrip Racing 1 | 66 | Brad Coleman 1 | Newt Moore 34; Cully Barraclough 1 |
| Dodge Ford | Michael Waltrip Racing 34; Brewco Motorsports 1 | 99 | Michael Waltrip 21 | Cully Barraclough 9 Newt Moore 1 Jerry Baxter 25 |
| Dodge Ford | Michael Waltrip Racing 34; Brewco Motorsports 1 | 99 | David Reutimann 12 | Cully Barraclough 9 Newt Moore 1 Jerry Baxter 25 |
| Dodge Ford | Michael Waltrip Racing 34; Brewco Motorsports 1 | 99 | Darrell Waltrip 1 | Cully Barraclough 9 Newt Moore 1 Jerry Baxter 25 |
| Dodge Ford | Michael Waltrip Racing 34; Brewco Motorsports 1 | 99 | Joey Miller 1 | Cully Barraclough 9 Newt Moore 1 Jerry Baxter 25 |
| Ford Chevrolet | Jay Robinson Racing (Note: At Kentucky (Race 16), Jamie Mosley wrecked the team's primary car (a Ford) and they had to run their backup car (a Chevrolet)) | 49 | Steve Grissom 2 | Kenneth Campbell |
| Ford Chevrolet | Jay Robinson Racing | 49 | Derrike Cope 10 | Kenneth Campbell |
| Ford Chevrolet | Jay Robinson Racing | 49 | Eduardo Goeters 1 | Kenneth Campbell |
| Ford Chevrolet | Jay Robinson Racing | 49 | Jorge Goeters (R) 6 | Kenneth Campbell |
| Ford Chevrolet | Jay Robinson Racing | 49 | Shane Hall 10 | Kenneth Campbell |
| Ford Chevrolet | Jay Robinson Racing | 49 | Randy LaJoie 1 | Kenneth Campbell |
| Ford Chevrolet | Jay Robinson Racing | 49 | Jamie Mosley 1 | Kenneth Campbell |
| Ford Chevrolet | Jay Robinson Racing | 49 | John Finger 1 | Kenneth Campbell |
| Ford Chevrolet | Jay Robinson Racing | 49 | Dexter Bean 1 | Kenneth Campbell |
| Ford Chevrolet | Jay Robinson Racing | 49 | Jennifer Jo Cobb 1 | Kenneth Campbell |
| Ford Chevrolet | Jay Robinson Racing | 49 | Morgan Shepherd 1 | Kenneth Campbell |
| Dodge Chevrolet | Phoenix Racing | 1 | Jason Keller 8 | Marc Reno |
| Dodge Chevrolet | Phoenix Racing | 1 | Mike Wallace 23 | Marc Reno |
| Dodge Chevrolet | Phoenix Racing | 1 | Cale Gale 3 | Marc Reno |
| Dodge Chevrolet | Phoenix Racing | 1 | Scott Pruett 1 | Marc Reno |

=== Limited schedule ===
| Manufacturer | Team | No. | Race driver | Round(s) |
|---|---|---|---|---|
| Chevrolet | Richard Childress Racing | 29 | Kevin Harvick | 1 |
| Chevrolet | Richard Childress Racing | 29 | Jeff Burton | 10 |
| Chevrolet | Richard Childress Racing | 29 | Timothy Peters | 1 |
| Chevrolet | Hendrick Motorsports | 48 | Jimmie Johnson | 3 |
| Chevrolet | Hendrick Motorsports | 57 | Brian Vickers | 8 |
| Chevrolet | Hendrick Motorsports | 57 | Adrián Fernández | 2 |
| Chevrolet | Robby Gordon Motorsports | 7 | Robby Gordon | 2 |
| Chevrolet | Dale Earnhardt, Inc. | 8 | Dale Earnhardt Jr. | 5 |
| Chevrolet | Dale Earnhardt, Inc. | 8 | Martin Truex Jr. | 3 |
| Chevrolet | Dale Earnhardt, Inc. | 8 | Tony Stewart | 1 |
| Chevrolet | Joe Gibbs Racing | 19 | Aric Almirola | 9 |
| Chevrolet | Joe Gibbs Racing | 19 | Tony Stewart | 1 |
| Chevrolet | Keith Coleman Racing | 26 | Joey McCarthy | 1 |
| Chevrolet | Keith Coleman Racing | 26 | Carl Long | 1 |
| Chevrolet | Duesenberg & Leik Motorsports | 26 | Dwayne Leik | 1 |
| Chevrolet | SKI Motorsports | 30 | Mike Bliss | 4 |
| Chevrolet | Marsh Racing | 31 | Steve Park | 6 |
| Chevrolet | Marsh Racing | 31 | Peyton Sellers | 2 |
| Chevrolet | Frank Cicci Racing | 34 | Paul Tracy | 5 |
| Chevrolet | Frank Cicci Racing | 34 | Todd Bodine | 2 |
| Chevrolet | Frank Cicci Racing | 34 | Carlos Pardo | 1 |
| Chevrolet | Frank Cicci Racing | 34 | Scott Lynch | 1 |
| Chevrolet | Frank Cicci Racing | 34 | Mike Bliss | 4 |
| Chevrolet | Frank Cicci Racing | 34 | Jason Keller | 1 |
| Chevrolet | Frank Cicci Racing | 34 | Kertus Davis | 2 |
| Chevrolet | Frank Cicci Racing | 34 | Jeff Fuller | 2 |
| Chevrolet | Frank Cicci Racing | 34 | Kim Crosby | 1 |
| Chevrolet | Frank Cicci Racing | 34 | Kevin Lepage | 1 |
| Chevrolet | Frank Cicci Racing | 34 | Brian Simo | 1 |
| Chevrolet | Vision Racing | 37 | Josh Krug | 2 |
| Chevrolet | Vision Racing | 37 | Randy LaJoie | 2 |
| Chevrolet | Mac Hill Motorsports | 56 | Kevin Lepage | 7 |
| Chevrolet | Mac Hill Motorsports | 56 | Chris Cook | 2 |
| Chevrolet | Mac Hill Motorsports | 56 | Kevin Grubb | 5 |
| Chevrolet | Mac Hill Motorsports | 56 | Tim Schendel | 1 |
| Chevrolet | Keith Coleman Racing | 23 | Chris Wimmer (R) | 8 |
| Chevrolet | Keith Coleman Racing | 23 | Marc Mitchell | 1 |
| Chevrolet | Keith Coleman Racing | 23 | Carl Long | 5 |
| Chevrolet | Keith Coleman Racing | 23 | Stan Boyd | 1 |
| Chevrolet | Keith Coleman Racing | 23 | Eduardo Troconis | 1 |
| Chevrolet | Keith Coleman Racing | 23 | Brad Keselowski | 8 |
| Chevrolet | Keith Coleman Racing | 23 | Brian Keselowski | 1 |
| Chevrolet | Horn Auto Racing | 58 | Chris Horn | 3 |
| Chevrolet | MacDonald Motorsports | 58 | Donnie Neuenberger | 2 |
| Chevrolet | MacDonald Motorsports | 58 | Patrick Goeters | 1 |
| Chevrolet | S.W.A.T. Racing | 62 | Larry Hollenbeck | 1 |
| Chevrolet | Silva Motorsports | 65 | Stan Silva Jr. | 2 |
| Chevrolet | ML Motorsports | 70 | Justin Diercks | 11 |
| Chevrolet | RB1 Motorsports | 71 | Ron Young | 3 |
| Chevrolet | Henderson Motorsports | 75 | Caleb Holman | 4 |
| Chevrolet | Team Johnson Racing | 76 | Jerick Johnson | 1 |
| Chevrolet | Furniture Row Racing | 78 | Jerry Robertson | 12 |
| Chevrolet | Odle Motorsports | 79 | Chris Wimmer | 1 |
| Chevrolet | Odle Motorsports | 79 | Shelby Howard | 1 |
| Chevrolet | Richardson Racing | 80 | Robert Richardson Jr. | 3 |
| Chevrolet | JR Motorsports | 83 | Shane Huffman | 1 |
| Chevrolet | Clay Andrews Racing | 84 | David Gilliland | 9 |
| Chevrolet | Premier Motorsport | 85 | John Hayden | 3 |
| Chevrolet | NEMCO Motorsports | 87 | Joe Nemechek | 2 |
| Chevrolet | Stanton Barrett Racing | 95 | Stanton Barrett | 2 |
| Chevrolet | Matt Kobyluck Racing | 04 | Matt Kobyluck | 2 |
| Chevrolet | Morgan-McClure Motorsports | 04 | Eric McClure | 3 |
| Chevrolet | Ginn Racing | 04 | Kraig Kinser | 1 |
| Chevrolet | Day Enterprise Racing | 05 | Chad Chaffin | 3 |
| Chevrolet | Day Enterprise Racing | 05 | Brad Teague | 3 |
| Chevrolet | Day Enterprise Racing | 05 | Justin Ashburn | 1 |
| Chevrolet | Day Enterprise Racing | 05 | Morgan Shepherd | 1 |
| Chevrolet | Day Enterprise Racing | 05 | Brett Rowe | 2 |
| Chevrolet | TC Motorsports | 07 | David Odell | 4 |
| Chevrolet | TC Motorsports | 07 | Chuck Barnes Jr. | 1 |
| Chevrolet | Boys Racing | 08 | Trevor Boys | 1 |
| Chevrolet | Braun-Akins Racing | 32 | Jason Leffler | 9 |
| Chevrolet | Braun-Akins Racing | 32 | Dave Blaney | 7 |
| Chevrolet | Braun-Akins Racing | 32 | Chase Pistone | 1 |
| Chevrolet | Braun-Akins Racing | 38 | Ryan Moore | 1 |
| Chevrolet | Braun-Akins Racing | 38 | Jason Leffler | 26 |
| Dodge | Braun-Akins Racing | 38 | A. J. Foyt IV (R) | 7 |
| Dodge | FitzBradshaw Racing | 14 | Tracy Hines (R) | 7 |
| Dodge | FitzBradshaw Racing | 14 | Carlos Contreras | 2 |
| Dodge | FitzBradshaw Racing | 14 | Steadman Marlin | 1 |
| Dodge | FitzBradshaw Racing | 14 | A. J. Foyt IV | 1 |
| Dodge | FitzBradshaw Racing | 14 | Ricky Craven | 1 |
| Dodge | FitzBradshaw Racing | 14 | Ted Musgrave | 4 |
| Dodge | FitzBradshaw Racing | 14 | Scott Wimmer | 2 |
| Dodge | FitzBradshaw Racing | 14 | Willie Allen | 2 |
| Dodge | FitzBradshaw Racing | 44 | David Reutimann | 1 |
| Dodge | Carver Racing | 40 | Kevin Conway | 3 |
| Dodge | Carver Racing | 58 | Kevin Conway | 3 |
| Dodge | Chip Ganassi Racing | 42 | Casey Mears | 9 |
| Dodge | Chip Ganassi Racing | 42 | Juan Pablo Montoya | 4 |
| Dodge | Curb Agajanian Performance Group | 43 | Aaron Fike | 13 |
| Dodge | Curb Agajanian Performance Group | 43 | Kertus Davis | 1 |
| Dodge | Curb Agajanian Performance Group | 43 | Chris Cook | 4 |
| Dodge | Curb Agajanian Performance Group | 43 | P. J. Jones | 4 |
| Dodge | Curb Agajanian Performance Group | 43 | Erin Crocker | 1 |
| Dodge | Penske Racing | 39 | Kurt Busch | 7 |
| Dodge | Penske Racing | 39 | Sam Hornish Jr. | 2 |
| Dodge | Penske Racing | 39 | Ryan Newman | 5 |
| Dodge | Penske Racing | 02 | Ryan Newman | 1 |
| Dodge | Rusty Wallace, Inc. | 61 | Steve Wallace | 2 |
| Dodge | Tom Eriksen Racing | 67 | Rogelio López | 1 |
| Dodge | TW Motorsports | 68 | Jimmy Morales | 1 |
| Dodge | Bryan Racing | 68 | Dawayne Bryan | 1 |
| Dodge | Robert Torriere Racing | 79 | Butch Leitzinger | 1 |
| Dodge | Sadler Brothers Racing | 95 | Steadman Marlin | 6 |
| Dodge | Sadler Brothers Racing | 95 | Chad Chaffin | 1 |
| Dodge | Ashton Gray Racing | 08 | Jason White | 5 |
| Ford | Long Brothers Racing | 89 | Richard Landreth | 2 |
| Ford | Long Brothers Racing | 89 | Carl Long | 1 |
| Ford | Roush Racing | 6 | Mark Martin | 7 |
| Ford | Roush Racing | 6 | David Ragan | 1 |
| Ford | Roush Racing | 16 | Greg Biffle | 26 |
| Ford | Roush Racing | 17 | Matt Kenseth | 21 |
| Ford | ppc Racing | 15 | Michel Jourdain Jr. | 3 |
| Ford | Brewco Motorsports | 37 | Brad Coleman | 1 |
| Ford | Chris Diederich Racing | 65 | Spencer Clark | 1 |
| Ford | Donnie Neuenberger | 52 | Donnie Neuenberger | 1 |
| Chevrolet Dodge | MacDonald Motorsports | 72 | Jerry Robertson | 1 |
| Chevrolet Dodge | MacDonald Motorsports | 72 | Stanton Barrett | 8 |
| Chevrolet Dodge | MacDonald Motorsports | 72 | Donnie Neuenberger | 1 |
| Chevrolet Dodge | MacDonald Motorsports | 72 | Eric McClure | 1 |
| Chevrolet Dodge | MacDonald Motorsports | 72 | Randy MacDonald | 2 |
| Chevrolet Dodge | MacDonald Motorsports | 72 | D. J. Kennington | 4 |
| Chevrolet Dodge | MacDonald Motorsports | 72 | Brad Baker | 1 |
| Chevrolet Ford | Jay Robinson Racing | 28 | Shane Hall | 6 |
| Chevrolet Ford | Jay Robinson Racing | 28 | Randy MacDonald | 1 |
| Chevrolet Ford | Jay Robinson Racing | 28 | Jorge Goeters (R) | 1 |
| Chevrolet Ford | Jay Robinson Racing | 28 | James Hylton | 1 |
| Chevrolet Ford | Jay Robinson Racing | 28 | Josh Richeson | 1 |
| Chevrolet Ford | Jay Robinson Racing | 28 | Todd Shafer | 1 |
| Chevrolet Ford | Jay Robinson Racing | 28 | Hermie Sadler | 1 |
| Chevrolet Ford | Jay Robinson Racing | 28 | Derrike Cope | 1 |
| Chevrolet Ford | Jeff Spraker Racing | 63 | Jeff Spraker | 1 |
| Chevrolet Ford | Jeff Spraker Racing | 63 | Dexter Bean | 1 |
| Chevrolet Ford | Jeff Spraker Racing | 63 | Jorge Goeters | 2 |

== Races ==
=== Hershey's Kissables 300 ===
The Hershey's Kissables 300 race was held on February 18, 2006, at Daytona International Speedway. J. J. Yeley won the pole.

Top ten results

1. #33 - Tony Stewart
2. #77 - Burney Lamar
3. #2 - Clint Bowyer
4. #47 - Jon Wood
5. #29 - Kevin Harvick
6. #32 - Jason Leffler
7. #06 - Todd Kluever
8. #18 - J. J. Yeley
9. #41 - Reed Sorenson
10. #4 - Mark Green

Failed to qualify: Kertus Davis (#0), Jay Sauter (#01), Kevin Lepage (#56), Chad Chaffin (#05), Larry Hollenbeck (#62), Chris Wimmer (#23).

=== Stater Brothers 300 ===
On February 25, 2006, the Busch Series took to California Speedway for this 300-mile race. Carl Edwards was the polesitter.

Top ten results

1. #16 - Greg Biffle
2. #39 - Ryan Newman
3. #60 - Carl Edwards
4. #21 - Jeff Burton
5. #64 - Jamie McMurray
6. #17 - Matt Kenseth
7. #18 - J. J. Yeley
8. #33 - Kevin Harvick
9. #57 - Brian Vickers
10. #20 - Denny Hamlin

Failed to qualify: Derrike Cope (#49), Chris Wimmer (#23), David Gilliland (#84).

- Matt Kenseth suffered a 25-point penalty for an unapproved adjustment found in his car during opening day inspection.

=== Telcel-Motorola 200 ===
This road-course race took place on March 5, 2006 at Autódromo Hermanos Rodriguez in Mexico City, Mexico. Boris Said won the pole.

Top ten results

1. #20 - Denny Hamlin
2. #9 - Boris Said
3. #21 - Kevin Harvick
4. #18 - J. J. Yeley
5. #11 - Paul Menard
6. #00 - Johnny Sauter
7. #5 - Kyle Busch
8. #60 - Carl Edwards
9. #90 - Marc Goossens
10. #64 - Jamie McMurray

Failed to qualify: Eduardo Goeters (#49), Stan Silva Jr. (#65), and Chris Wimmer (#23).

- This was Hamlin's first career Busch Series victory.

=== Sam's Town 300 ===
On March 11, 2006, the Busch Series raced at Las Vegas Motor Speedway. Matt Kenseth started from the pole position.

Top ten results

1. #9 - Kasey Kahne
2. #17 - Matt Kenseth
3. #21 - Kevin Harvick
4. #16 - Greg Biffle
5. #60 - Carl Edwards
6. #20 - Denny Hamlin
7. #64 - Jamie McMurray
8. #18 - J. J. Yeley
9. #2 - Clint Bowyer
10. #41 - Reed Sorenson

Failed to qualify: Jorge Goeters (#49), Kertus Davis (#0), Chris Wimmer (#23).

- Spencer Clark made his only career Busch Series start in this race. He would pass away two months later.

=== Nicorette 300 ===
The Nicorette 300 was held on March 18 at Atlanta Motor Speedway. Kyle Busch was the polesitter.

Top ten results

1. #21 - Jeff Burton
2. #9 - Kasey Kahne
3. #16 - Greg Biffle
4. #17 - Matt Kenseth
5. #18 - J. J. Yeley
6. #32 - Jason Leffler
7. #57 - Brian Vickers
8. #77 - Burney Lamar
9. #64 - Jamie McMurray
10. #11 - Paul Menard

Failed to qualify: Jorge Goeters (#49), Steadman Marlin (#95), Chris Wimmer (#23)

=== Sharpie Mini 300 ===
This race was held on March 25 at Bristol Motor Speedway. Qualifying was snowed out and the field was set by current owner points. As a result, Kevin Harvick started from pole. The race was also halted by snow and drivers, crews, and fans amused themselves by throwing snowballs and building a snowman. The race was restarted after a 90-minute delay and run full-distance.

Top Ten results

1. #5 - Kyle Busch
2. #21 - Kevin Harvick
3. #17 - Matt Kenseth
4. #20 - Denny Hamlin
5. #60 - Carl Edwards
6. #9 - Scott Riggs
7. #33 - Ron Hornaday Jr.
8. #22 - Kenny Wallace
9. #10 - John Andretti
10. #00 - Johnny Sauter

Failed to qualify: Caleb Holman (#75), Brad Teague (#05), Jerry Robertson (#72), Shane Hall (#28)

=== O'Reilly 300 ===
This race was held on April 8 at Texas Motor Speedway. Denny Hamlin won the pole, the first of his Busch series career. The race finished under a green-white-checker finish.

Top ten results

1. #39 - Kurt Busch
2. #16 - Greg Biffle
3. #32 - Casey Mears
4. #5 - Kyle Busch
5. #17 - Matt Kenseth
6. #21 - Jeff Burton
7. #11 - Paul Menard
8. #33 - Kevin Harvick
9. #66 - Scott Wimmer
10. #20 - Denny Hamlin

Failed to qualify: Kertus Davis (#0), Jorge Goeters (#49), Chris Wimmer (#23)

- This was Kurt Busch's first career Busch Series victory, coming in his first Busch Series start. Busch was the last driver to accomplish this feat until Ty Gibbs in 2022.
- Matt Kenseth suffered a 25-point penalty for an unapproved adjustment to his car found in post-race inspection.

=== Pepsi 300 ===
This race was on held April 15 at Nashville Superspeedway. Denny Hamlin won his second pole in a row.

Top ten results

1. #21 - Kevin Harvick
2. #2 - Clint Bowyer
3. #20 - Denny Hamlin
4. #18 - J. J. Yeley
5. #60 - Carl Edwards
6. #47 - Jon Wood
7. #77 - Burney Lamar
8. #22 - Kenny Wallace
9. #11 - Paul Menard
10. #99 - Michael Waltrip

Failed to qualify: Jason White (#08)

=== Bashas' Supermarkets 200 ===
This race was held April 21 at Phoenix International Raceway. Jason Leffler won the pole. The race finished under a green-white-checker finish as Kevin Harvick won his second race in a row.

Top ten results:

1. #21 - Kevin Harvick
2. #41 - Reed Sorenson
3. #60 - Carl Edwards
4. #39 - Kurt Busch
5. #6 - Mark Martin
6. #17 - Matt Kenseth
7. #16 - Greg Biffle
8. #27 - David Green
9. #42 - Casey Mears
10. #64 - Jamie McMurray

Failed to qualify: Jay Sauter (#01), Chris Cook (#56), Jorge Goeters (#49), and Marc Mitchell (#23).

=== Aaron's 312 ===
This race was held April 29 at Talladega Superspeedway. J. J. Yeley won the pole.

Top ten results

1. #8 - Martin Truex Jr.
2. #21 - Kevin Harvick
3. #5 - Kyle Busch
4. #57 - Brian Vickers
5. #2 - Clint Bowyer
6. #16 - Greg Biffle
7. #88 - Mark McFarland
8. #00 - Johnny Sauter
9. #11 - Paul Menard
10. #60 - Carl Edwards

Failed to qualify: none

- Tony Stewart flipped during the race when Stewart was turned by Kenny Wallace.
- Kevin Harvick, Burney Lamar, who finished 20th, and Tony Stewart, who finished 39th, all suffered 25 point penalties for unapproved adjustments to their cars.

=== Circuit City 250 ===
This race was held May 5 and May 6 at Richmond International Raceway. Jason Leffler won the pole. The race start was delayed approximately 1 hour for rain, after 13 laps rain fell again and the race was stopped for approximately another 43 minutes. The race eventually finished after midnight local time, resulting in the race occurring over two days. Kevin Harvick won his third Busch race of the year.

Top ten results

1. #21 - Kevin Harvick
2. #29 - Jeff Burton
3. #17 - Matt Kenseth
4. #16 - Greg Biffle
5. #39 - Ryan Newman
6. #60 - Carl Edwards
7. #2 - Clint Bowyer
8. #11 - Paul Menard
9. #5 - Kyle Busch
10. #20 - Denny Hamlin

Failed to qualify: Jason Keller (#34), Jorge Goeters (#28), Shane Hall (#49), Kevin Conway (#40), Joel Kauffman (#12), Kertus Davis (#0), A. J. Foyt IV (#14)

=== Diamond Hill Plywood 200 ===
This race was held May 12 at Darlington Raceway. Denny Hamlin won from the pole.

1. #20 - Denny Hamlin
2. #17 - Matt Kenseth
3. #64 - Jamie McMurray
4. #6 - Mark Martin
5. #16 - Greg Biffle
6. #5 - Kyle Busch
7. #21 - Kevin Harvick
8. #60 - Carl Edwards
9. #18 - J. J. Yeley
10. #38 - Jason Leffler

Failed to qualify: Derrike Cope (#49), Morgan Shepherd (#0), Shane Hall (#28), Caleb Holman (#75)

=== Carquest Auto Parts 300 ===
This race was held May 27 at Lowe's Motor Speedway. Matt Kenseth won the pole.

Top ten results

1. #60 - Carl Edwards
2. #39 - Kurt Busch
3. #18 - J. J. Yeley
4. #42 - Casey Mears
5. #8 - Martin Truex Jr.
6. #29 - Jeff Burton
7. #48 - Jimmie Johnson
8. #21 - Kevin Harvick
9. #06 - Todd Kluever
10. #35 - Regan Smith

Failed to qualify: Aaron Fike (#43), David Gilliland (#84), Stanton Barrett (#72), Joel Kauffman (#12), Eric McClure (#04), Kevin Conway (#40), Kertus Davis (#34)

=== Stonebridgeracing.com 200 ===
This race was held June 3 at Dover International Speedway. Qualifying was rained out, and the field was set by the rulebook, with the top 30 teams taking the first fifteen rows. Because of that, Kevin Harvick was awarded the pole position.

Top ten results:

1. #29 - Jeff Burton
2. #60 - Carl Edwards
3. #39 - Kurt Busch
4. #2 - Clint Bowyer
5. #33 - Ron Hornaday Jr.
6. #5 - Kyle Busch
7. #20 - Denny Hamlin
8. #16 - Greg Biffle
9. #18 - J. J. Yeley
10. #41 - Reed Sorenson

Failed to qualify: none

=== Federated Auto Parts 300 ===
This race was held June 10 at Nashville Superspeedway. Todd Kluever won the pole.

top ten results

1. #60 - Carl Edwards
2. #2 - Clint Bowyer
3. #21 - Kevin Harvick
4. #20 - Denny Hamlin
5. #11 - Paul Menard
6. #99 - David Reutimann
7. #66 - Greg Biffle
8. #47 - Jon Wood
9. #25 - Ashton Lewis
10. #50 - Danny O'Quinn Jr.

Failed to qualify: Jerry Robertson (#78), John Hayden (#85)

=== Meijer 300 ===
This race was held June 17 at Kentucky Speedway. Denny Hamlin won the pole. In a stunning upset, David Gilliland became the first winner in the 2006 season that was not on a team with a Nextel Cup driver.

Top ten results:

1. #84 - David Gilliland*
2. #18 - J. J. Yeley
3. #20 - Denny Hamlin
4. #1 - Mike Wallace
5. #25 - Ashton Lewis
6. #21 - Kevin Harvick
7. #66 - Greg Biffle
8. #99 - David Reutimann
9. #11 - Paul Menard
10. #90 - Stephen Leicht

Failed to qualify: John Hayden (#85), David Odell (#07), Stan Boyd (#23)

- Gilliland's victory came in his seventh career Busch Series start, with a prior best finish of 29th.
- Gilliland's victory, along with Paul Menard's victory next week at Milwaukee, were the only Busch Series races in 2006 to be won by non-full-time Cup Series drivers.
- Jeff Fuller was involved in a severe crash where, trying to avoid the spinning car of Jason Leffler, Fuller hit the inside wall at full speed, and the car practically imploded on impact. Fuller suffered a broken wrist and thumb.
- On lap 140, a fire alarm went off in the FX broadcasting booth, with lead broadcaster Phil Parsons jokingly stating there was "nothing to be alarmed about".

=== AT&T 250 ===
This race was held June 24 at The Milwaukee Mile. Aric Almirola won the pole in the car normally driven by Denny Hamlin who actually drove the race in the car and started from the back. As a result, Paul Menard started the race from the pole position.

Top ten results

1. #11 - Paul Menard*
2. #20 - Denny Hamlin
3. #18 - J. J. Yeley
4. #38 - Jason Leffler
5. #1 - Mike Wallace
6. #59 - Stacy Compton
7. #50 - Danny O'Quinn Jr.
8. #22 - Kenny Wallace
9. #00 - Johnny Sauter
10. #99 - David Reutimann

Failed to qualify: none

- This was Menard's first Busch Series victory.
- Menard's victory was only one all season by a full-time Busch Series driver who wasn't also full-time in the Cup Series.
- Kevin Harvick was involved in a late-race wreck and finished 19th, his lowest-finishing race result in 2006.
- Only 41 cars started the race, instead of the usual 43.

=== Winn-Dixie 250 ===
The Winn-Dixie 250 was held June 30 at Daytona International Speedway. J. J. Yeley won the pole.

Top ten results:

1. #8 - Dale Earnhardt Jr.
2. #57 - Brian Vickers
3. #21 - Kevin Harvick
4. #18 - J. J. Yeley
5. #60 - Carl Edwards
6. #2 - Clint Bowyer
7. #1 - Mike Wallace
8. #88 - Martin Truex Jr.
9. #16 - Greg Biffle
10. #10 - John Andretti

Failed to qualify: none

- Kevin Harvick and Burney Lamar, who finished 22nd, suffered 50 point penalties for unapproved adjustments found on their cars during post-race inspection.
- This was the final Busch Series race to be broadcast on FOX until 2015.

=== USG Durock 300 ===
This race was held on July 8 at Chicagoland Speedway. Carl Edwards won the pole.

Top ten results

1. #42 - Casey Mears
2. #60 - Carl Edwards
3. #29 - Jeff Burton
4. #21 - Kevin Harvick
5. #17 - Matt Kenseth
6. #39 - Kurt Busch
7. #2 - Clint Bowyer
8. #41 - Reed Sorenson
9. #33 - Tony Stewart
10. #18 - J. J. Yeley

Failed to qualify: Derrike Cope (#49), Justin Diercks (#70), Carl Long (#23)

- This was Mears' first career NASCAR victory, which he won using an alternate fuel strategy.

=== New England 200 ===
The New England 200 was held July 15 at New Hampshire International Speedway. Kyle Busch won the pole. Clint Bowyer dominated early in the race but Carl Edwards captured the victory.

Top ten results:

1. #60 - Carl Edwards
2. #21 - Kevin Harvick
3. #20 - Denny Hamlin
4. #11 - Paul Menard
5. #2 - Clint Bowyer
6. #00 - Johnny Sauter
7. #9 - Scott Riggs
8. #18 - J. J. Yeley
9. #66 - Scott Wimmer
10. #16 - Greg Biffle

Failed to qualify: none

- Aaron Fike was black-flagged on lap 60 for intentionally throwing his glove on the track to cause a caution.

=== Goody's 250 ===
The Goody's 250 was held July 22 at Martinsville Speedway. Clint Bowyer won the pole.

Top ten results

1. #21 - Kevin Harvick
2. #2 - Clint Bowyer
3. #20 - Denny Hamlin
4. #41 - Reed Sorenson
5. #00 - Johnny Sauter
6. #60 - Carl Edwards
7. #10 - John Andretti
8. #38 - Jason Leffler
9. #18 - J. J. Yeley
10. #01 - Jay Sauter

Failed to qualify: Richard Landreth (#89)

- This was the first Busch Series race held at Martinsville since October 1994.
- Darrell Waltrip and Ricky Craven both made their final career NASCAR starts in this race. Waltrip finished 28th while Craven finished 39th. This was also Waltrip's first Busch Series start since 1995.

=== Busch Silver Celebration 250 ===
The Busch Silver Celebration 250 was held July 29 at Gateway International Raceway. Denny Hamlin won the pole.

Top ten results

1. #60 - Carl Edwards
2. #2 - Clint Bowyer
3. #20 - Denny Hamlin
4. #41 - Reed Sorenson
5. #21 - Kevin Harvick
6. #66 - Scott Wimmer
7. #27 - David Green
8. #5 - Kyle Busch
9. #22 - Kenny Wallace
10. #56 - Kevin Grubb

Failed to qualify: Brad Teague (#05), Shane Hall (#49), Kevin Hamlin (#12)

- Tim Sauter, who finished 22nd, suffered a 50-point penalty for illegal shocks found on his car during post-race inspection.

=== Kroger 200 ===
The Kroger 200 was held August 5 at O'Reilly Raceway Park. Denny Hamlin won his second pole in a row for the second time in 2006.

Top ten results

1. #21 - Kevin Harvick
2. #41 - Reed Sorenson
3. #18 - J. J. Yeley
4. #16 - Greg Biffle
5. #29 - Jeff Burton
6. #50 - Danny O'Quinn Jr.
7. #01 - Jay Sauter
8. #20 - Denny Hamlin
9. #11 - Paul Menard
10. #60 - Carl Edwards

Failed to qualify: Todd Shafer (#28)

=== Zippo 200 ===
This race was held August 12 at Watkins Glen International. Kurt Busch won the race from the pole. Kurt Busch and Robby Gordon cut off track several times to duel on the final lap.

Top ten results: 202.45 miles/83 laps due to green-white-checkered rule.

1. #39 - Kurt Busch
2. #7 - Robby Gordon
3. #64 - Jamie McMurray
4. #66 - Greg Biffle
5. #10 - John Andretti
6. #88 - Martin Truex Jr.
7. #21 - Kevin Harvick
8. #9 - Boris Said
9. #33 - Ron Fellows
10. #1 - Scott Pruett

Failed to qualify: Stan Silva Jr. (#65), Eduardo Troconis (#23), John Finger (#49)

=== Carfax 250 ===
This race was held August 19 at Michigan International Speedway. Mark Martin won the pole.

Top ten results: 128 laps/256 miles due to green-white-checkered rule.

1. #8 - Dale Earnhardt Jr.
2. #42 - Casey Mears
3. #88 - Robby Gordon
4. #17 - Matt Kenseth
5. #6 - Mark Martin
6. #20 - Denny Hamlin
7. #41 - Reed Sorenson
8. #21 - Kevin Harvick
9. #18 - J. J. Yeley
10. #29 - Jeff Burton

Failed to qualify: Jerry Robertson (#78), Dexter Bean (#49)

- Earnhardt's victory came under controversy after he spun Carl Edwards out of the race lead with two laps to go.
- Final Busch Series win for DEI.

=== Food City 250 ===
This race was held August 25 at Bristol Motor Speedway. Ryan Newman won the pole.

Top ten results:

1. #17 - Matt Kenseth
2. #21 - Kevin Harvick
3. #33 - Ron Hornaday Jr.
4. #9 - Kasey Kahne
5. #38 - Jason Leffler
6. #39 - Ryan Newman
7. #5 - Kyle Busch
8. #60 - Carl Edwards
9. #99 - David Reutimann
10. #11 - Paul Menard

Failed to qualify: Carl Long (#89), Caleb Holman (#75), D. J. Kennington (#72), Brad Keselowski (#23)

=== Ameriquest 300 ===
This race was held September 2 at California Speedway. Clint Bowyer won the pole.

Top ten results:

1. #9 - Kasey Kahne
2. #21 - Kevin Harvick
3. #6 - Mark Martin
4. #11 - Paul Menard
5. #25 - Ashton Lewis
6. #33 - Tony Stewart
7. #17 - Matt Kenseth
8. #47 - Jon Wood
9. #88 - Robby Gordon
10. #01 - Jay Sauter

Failed to qualify: Derrike Cope (#49)

- Brad Keselowski made his Busch Series debut in this race, driving the #23 Chevy for Keith Coleman Racing. Keselowski started 32nd, and finished 37th.

=== Emerson Radio 250 ===
This race was held September 8 at Richmond International Raceway. Jeff Burton won the pole.

Top ten results:

1. #21 - Kevin Harvick
2. #16 - Greg Biffle
3. #17 - Matt Kenseth
4. #11 - Paul Menard
5. #41 - Reed Sorenson
6. #20 - Denny Hamlin
7. #32 - Dave Blaney
8. #66 - Scott Wimmer
9. #60 - Carl Edwards
10. #9 - Scott Riggs

Failed to qualify: Chris Cook (#43), Hermie Sadler (#28), Justin Diercks (#70), Josh Krug (#37), Shane Hall (#49)

=== Dover 200 ===
This race was held September 23 at Dover International Speedway. Scott Riggs won the pole. Clint Bowyer held off Matt Kenseth in a green-white-checker finish.

Top ten results:

1. #2 - Clint Bowyer
2. #17 - Matt Kenseth
3. #21 - Kevin Harvick
4. #64 - Jamie McMurray
5. #38 - Jason Leffler
6. #41 - Reed Sorenson
7. #5 - Kyle Busch
8. #16 - Greg Biffle
9. #18 - J. J. Yeley
10. #99 - Michael Waltrip

Failed to qualify: none

=== Yellow Transportation 300 ===
The Yellow Transportation 300 was held September 30 at Kansas Speedway. Matt Kenseth won the pole.

Top ten results:

1. #21 - Kevin Harvick*
2. #17 - Matt Kenseth
3. #5 - Kyle Busch
4. #33 - Tony Stewart
5. #2 - Clint Bowyer
6. #60 - Carl Edwards
7. #41 - Reed Sorenson
8. #16 - Greg Biffle
9. #77 - Bobby Labonte
10. #11 - Paul Menard

Failed to qualify: Randy LaJoie (#37), Steadman Marlin (#95)

- With this victory, Harvick extended his points lead to 729 points over 2nd-place Carl Edwards, giving him a near four-race long lead in the championship, since the maximum amount of points that can be earned in a race is 190. Harvick could mathematically win the championship next week at Charlotte if he scores at least 32 more points than Edwards.

=== Dollar General 300 ===
This race was held October 13 at Lowe's Motor Speedway. Carl Edwards started from the pole. Kevin Harvick, despite failing to finish on the lead lap for the only time in the 2006 season, clinched the Busch Series Championship following a wreck involving second-place driver Carl Edwards and Casey Mears on lap 199 (at the start-finish line from lap 198 to lap 199) of a scheduled 200-lap race.

Top ten results: 203 laps/304.5 miles due to the green-white-checker rule

1. #32 - Dave Blaney*
2. #99 - Michael Waltrip
3. #59 - Stacy Compton
4. #17 - Matt Kenseth
5. #50 - Danny O'Quinn Jr.
6. #00 - Johnny Sauter
7. #2 - Clint Bowyer
8. #20 - Denny Hamlin
9. #33 - Kevin Harvick*
10. #25 - Ashton Lewis

Failed to qualify: Tim Sauter (#36), Kertus Davis (#0), Robert Richardson Jr. (#80), Eric McClure (#04), Derrike Cope (#49)

- This would be Blaney's first and only career Busch Series victory.
- Harvick locked-up the championship with four races remaining, making it the earliest championship victory in a season in NASCAR history.
- Edwards crashing out allowed Harvick to extend his points lead to 775 points ahead of 2nd-place with four races left, enough to mathematically win the title since the maximum amount of points earned in four races is 760.

=== Sam's Town 250 ===
This race was held October 28 at Memphis Motorsports Park. Johnny Sauter won the pole.

Top ten results:

1. #21 - Kevin Harvick
2. #2 - Clint Bowyer
3. #60 - Carl Edwards
4. #00 - Johnny Sauter
5. #88 - Shane Huffman
6. #20 - Denny Hamlin
7. #41 - Reed Sorenson
8. #50 - Danny O'Quinn Jr.
9. #9 - Kasey Kahne
10. #18 - J. J. Yeley

Failed to qualify: Ron Young (#71), Stanton Barrett (#95), Chris Wimmer (#0), Shane Hall (#49), Richard Landreth (#89), Chuck Barnes Jr. (#07), Brett Rowe (#05)

- Juan Pablo Montoya made his NASCAR debut in this race, starting 9th and finishing 11th.

=== O'Reilly Challenge ===
This race was held on November 4 at Texas Motor Speedway. Mark Martin won the pole.Former series champion Randy LaJoie.

Top ten results:

1. #21 - Kevin Harvick
2. #19 - Tony Stewart
3. #29 - Jeff Burton
4. #6 - Mark Martin
5. #33 - Ron Hornaday Jr.
6. #18 - J. J. Yeley
7. #60 - Carl Edwards
8. #20 - Denny Hamlin
9. #77 - Bobby Labonte
10. #06 - Todd Kluever

Failed to qualify: Justin Diercks (#70), Robert Richardson Jr. (#80), Jerry Robertson (#78), Derrike Cope (#49), Jorge Goeters (#63)

- Former series champion Randy LaJoie made his final career NASCAR start in this race, starting 43rd and finishing 41st.

=== Arizona.Travel 200 ===
The Arizona.Travel 200 was held November 11 at Phoenix International Raceway. Matt Kenseth won the race from the pole.

Top ten results: 203 miles/203 laps due to green-white-checkered rule.

1. #17 - Matt Kenseth
2. #21 - Kevin Harvick
3. #20 - Denny Hamlin
4. #2 - Clint Bowyer
5. #60 - Carl Edwards
6. #18 - J. J. Yeley
7. #41 - Reed Sorenson
8. #88 - Shane Huffman
9. #33 - Ron Hornaday Jr.
10. #5 - Kyle Busch

Failed to qualify: Mike Skinner (#12), D. J. Kennington (#72), Shane Hall (#49), Josh Krug (#37)

- 2006 IndyCar champion Sam Hornish Jr. made his NASCAR debut in this race.
- This was the last Busch Series race to air on NBC until 2015.

=== Ford 300 ===
The Ford 300 was held November 18 at Homestead-Miami Speedway. Kevin Harvick won the pole.

Top ten results:

1. #17 - Matt Kenseth
2. #60 - Carl Edwards
3. #11 - Paul Menard
4. #20 - Denny Hamlin
5. #18 - J. J. Yeley
6. #21 - Kevin Harvick
7. #8 - Dale Earnhardt Jr.
8. #9 - Kasey Kahne
9. #06 - Todd Kluever
10. #00 - Johnny Sauter

Failed to qualify: Robert Richardson Jr. (#80), Justin Diercks (#70), D. J. Kennington (#72), Kertus Davis (#0), Kraig Kinser (#04), Dawayne Bryan (#68), Morgan Shepherd (#49), Trevor Boys (#08), Brett Rowe (#05)

- This was the final Busch Series broadcast on TNT, as ESPN/ABC took over exclusive rights for the series from 2007-2014.

== Final standings ==
=== Full Drivers' Championship ===
(key) Bold – Pole position awarded by time. Italics – Pole position set by owner's points. * – Most laps led.

| Pos | Driver | DAY | CAL | MXC | LVS | ATL | BRI | TEX | NSH | PHO | TAL | RCH | DAR | CLT | DOV | NSH | KEN | MIL | DAY | CHI | NHA | MAR | GTY | IRP | GLN | MCH | BRI | CAL | RCH | DOV | KAN | CLT | MEM | TEX | PHO | HOM | Pts |
|---|---|---|---|---|---|---|---|---|---|---|---|---|---|---|---|---|---|---|---|---|---|---|---|---|---|---|---|---|---|---|---|---|---|---|---|---|---|
| 1 | Kevin Harvick | 5 | 8 | 3 | 3* | 11 | 2* | 8 | 1 | 1 | 2 | 1 | 7 | 8 | 13 | 3 | 6 | 19 | 3 | 4 | 2 | 1* | 5 | 1* | 7 | 8 | 2 | 2 | 1* | 3 | 1 | 9 | 1 | 1* | 2 | **6** | 5648 |
| 2 | Carl Edwards | 39 | **3** | 8 | 5 | 24 | 5 | 43 | 5 | 3 | 10 | 6 | 8 | 1 | 2* | 1* | 36 | 21 | 5 | **2** | 1 | 6 | 1 | 10 | 27 | 23 | 8 | 12 | 9 | 26 | 6 | 27* | 3 | 7 | 5 | 2 | 4824 |
| 3 | Clint Bowyer | 3 | 16 | 16 | 9 | 14 | 12 | 18 | 2 | 21 | 5 | 7 | 17 | 36 | 4 | 2 | 12 | 18 | 6 | 7 | 5* | **2** | 2 | 40 | 16 | 12 | 23 | **13** | 37 | 1 | 5 | 7 | 2 | 17 | 4 | 11 | 4683 |
| 4 | Denny Hamlin | 14 | 10 | 1* | 6 | 38 | 4 | **10** | **3*** | 39 | 30 | 10 | **1** | 29 | 7 | 4 | **3** | 2 | 30 | 14 | 3 | 3 | **3*** | **6** | 12 | 6 | 22 | 15 | 6 | 40 | 33 | 8 | 6 | 8 | 3 | 4 | 4667 |
| 5 | J. J. Yeley | **8** | 7 | 4 | 8 | 5 | 29 | 42 | 4 | 11 | 34 | 31 | 9 | 3 | 9 | 16 | 2 | 3 | **4** | 10 | 8 | 9 | 37 | 3 | 11 | 9 | 12 | 40 | 13 | 9 | 11 | 32 | 10 | 6 | 6 | 5 | 4487 |
| 6 | Paul Menard | 38 | 17 | 5 | 20 | 10 | 16 | 7 | 9 | 17 | 9 | 8 | 13 | 24 | 35 | 5 | 9 | 1* | 37 | 39 | 4 | 12 | 35 | 9 | 18 | 25 | 10 | 4 | 4 | 37 | 10 | 13 | 23 | 27 | 37 | 3 | 4075 |
| 7 | Kyle Busch | 25 | 23 | 7 | 19 | **40** | 1 | 4 | 30 | 12 | 3 | 9 | 6 | 23 | 6 | 31 | 13* | 24 | 16 | 42 | **16** | 20 | 8 | 21 | 37 | 14 | 7 | 11 | 12 | 7 | 3 | 12 | | 32 | 10 | 41 | 3921 |
| 8 | Johnny Sauter | 35 | 13 | 6 | 15 | 12 | 10 | 14 | 27 | 36 | 8 | 11 | 34 | 11 | 21 | 14 | 32 | 9 | 21 | 17 | 6 | 5 | 18 | 42 | 19 | 35 | 11 | 31 | 15 | 24 | 35 | 6 | **4*** | 35 | 11 | 10 | 3794 |
| 9 | Greg Biffle | 31 | 1* | | 4 | 3 | 28 | 2 | | 6 | 6 | 4 | 5 | 12 | 8 | 7 | 7 | | 9 | 24 | 10 | 17 | | 4 | 4 | 43 | 37 | 23 | 2 | 8 | 8 | 41 | | 23 | 12 | 38 | 3789 |
| 10 | Reed Sorenson | 9 | 11 | 36 | 10 | 42 | 27 | 13 | 19 | 2 | 17 | 36 | 23 | 21 | 10 | 23 | 39 | | 40 | 8 | 17 | 4 | 4 | 2 | 28 | 7 | 42 | 19 | 5 | 6 | 7 | 38 | 7 | 36 | 7 | 42 | 3670 |
| 11 | Kenny Wallace | 13 | 34 | 19 | 32 | 19 | 8 | 27 | 8 | 28 | 13 | 23 | 16 | 13 | 16 | 11 | 20 | 8 | 14 | 29 | 27 | 13 | 9 | 20 | 31 | 18 | 29 | 36 | 24 | 14 | 22 | 19 | 14 | 16 | 31 | 26 | 3626 |
| 12 | John Andretti **(R)** | 34 | 19 | 23 | 42 | 20 | 9 | 19 | 28 | 34 | 16 | 19 | 15 | 17 | 19 | 18 | 15 | 12 | 10 | 25 | 18 | 7 | 26 | 27 | 5 | 30 | 14 | 29 | 16 | 19 | 23 | 25 | 35 | 15 | 25 | 16 | 3562 |
| 13 | Jason Leffler | 6 | 22 | 17 | 11 | 6 | 32 | 17 | 35 | **22*** | 18 | **24** | 10 | 18 | 34 | 43 | 40 | 4 | 18 | 19 | 14 | 8 | 33 | 19 | 35 | 13 | 5 | 24 | 20 | 5 | 31 | 28 | 34 | 43 | 14 | 19 | 3554 |
| 14 | Jon Wood | 4 | 18 | 27 | 14 | 13 | 17 | 26 | 6 | 23 | 19 | 38 | 33 | 37 | 40 | 8 | 22 | 14 | 34 | 21 | 20 | 21 | 15 | 14 | 29 | 36 | 28 | 8 | 25 | 38 | 15 | 23 | 29 | 12 | 38 | 18 | 3381 |
| 15 | Ashton Lewis | 12 | 29 | 13 | 13 | 17 | 30 | 38 | 11 | 20 | 33 | 26 | 20 | 28 | 42 | 9 | 5 | 16 | 17 | 35 | 24 | 27 | 16 | 22 | 33 | 39 | 18 | 5 | 31 | 25 | 14 | 11 | 37 | 25 | 24 | 20 | 3376 |
| 16 | Stacy Compton | 27 | 24 | 43 | 33 | 27 | 14 | 22 | 20 | 26 | 26 | 37 | 14 | 30 | 12 | 19 | 24 | 6 | 20 | 20 | 25 | 15 | 17 | 12 | 30 | 41 | 16 | 18 | 34 | 20 | 34 | 3 | 24 | 22 | 22 | 17 | 3339 |
| 17 | Todd Kluever **(R)** | 7 | 12 | 32 | 21 | 18 | 34 | 21 | 32 | 42 | 27 | 22 | 32 | 9 | 18 | **17** | 17 | 23 | 25 | 18 | 13 | 30 | 13 | 24 | 38 | 37 | 39 | 27 | 36 | 13 | 37 | 18 | 16 | 10 | 18 | 9 | 3304 |
| 18 | Matt Kenseth | | 6 | | 2 | 4 | 3 | 5 | | 7 | | 3 | 2* | 38* | 26 | | | | | 5 | | | | | | 4 | 1 | 7 | 3 | 2 | **2*** | 4 | | 26 | **1*** | 1* | 3221 |
| 19 | Danny O'Quinn Jr. **(R)** | 18 | 31 | 26 | 25 | 25 | 11 | 32 | 14 | 14 | 38 | 20 | 38 | 22 | 24 | 10 | 23 | 7 | 41 | 31 | 29 | 22 | 24 | 6 | 25 | 20 | 26 | | 14 | | 18 | 5 | 9 | 30 | 32 | 35 | 3163 |
| 20 | Regan Smith | 26 | 28 | 25 | 22 | 21 | 38 | 34 | 13 | 27 | 37 | 21 | 19 | 10 | 39 | 35 | 16 | 22 | 15 | 28 | 35 | 14 | 23 | 11 | 23 | 31 | 19 | 28 | 26 | 17 | 19 | 37 | 21 | 20 | 29 | 31 | 3136 |
| 21 | Jay Sauter | DNQ | 41 | 24 | 34 | 29 | 23 | 40 | 18 | DNQ | 15 | 17 | 40 | 39 | 20 | 13 | 29 | 11 | 36 | 27 | 19 | 10 | 11 | 7 | 26 | 26 | 43 | 10 | 17 | 31 | 29 | 40 | 26 | 39 | 17 | 30 | 2879 |
| 22 | Burney Lamar **(R)** | 2 | 21 | 18 | 26 | 8 | 20 | 39 | 7 | 19 | 20 | 27 | 21 | 26 | 32 | 12 | 19 | 35 | 22 | 23 | | 23 | 12 | 16 | 20 | 38 | 24 | 14 | 33 | 39 | | | 38 | | | | 2710 |
| 23 | David Green | 37 | 20 | 35 | 29 | 36 | 25 | 16 | 29 | 9 | 24 | 12 | 24 | 14 | 17 | 21 | 21 | 17 | 23 | 22 | 22 | 31 | 7 | 28 | 15 | 32 | 21 | 26 | | | | | | | | | 2573 |
| 24 | Mike Wallace | | | | | | | | | 18 | 12 | 13 | 41 | 34 | 14 | | 4 | 5 | 7 | | 12 | 11 | 29 | 13 | | | 15 | 34 | 19 | 22 | 28 | 29 | 18 | 13 | 19 | 25 | 2479 |
| 25 | Jamie McMurray | 16 | 5 | 10 | 7 | 9 | | 15 | | 10 | 36 | | 3 | 43 | | | | | 11 | 40 | 32 | | | | 3 | | 30 | 17 | 11 | 4 | | 31 | | | 15 | | 2297 |
| 26 | Michael Waltrip | 15 | 26 | 40 | 24 | 22 | 26 | 25 | 10 | 13 | 14 | 25 | | 20 | 31 | | | | 38 | 11 | 23 | | | | 13 | 17 | | | | 10 | | 2 | | | 39 | | 2126 |
| 27 | Tim Sauter | 19 | 25 | 30 | 41 | 31 | 21 | 37 | 36 | 24 | 21 | 39 | 37 | 27 | 28 | 24 | 28 | 27 | 24 | 33 | 26 | 19 | 22 | 33 | | | 34 | | 35 | 28 | 25 | DNQ | 31 | | | | 2109 |
| 28 | Jeff Burton | 30 | 4 | | | 1* | | 6 | | | | 2 | | 6 | 1 | | | | | 3 | 21 | | | 5 | | 10 | 33 | | **40** | | 40 | 35 | | 3 | | | 2040 |
| 29 | Scott Wimmer | | 14 | | | | | 9 | | | | 16 | 26 | 25 | 15 | | | 29 | 33 | | 9 | | 6 | | | 42 | 17 | 25 | 8 | 11 | | 21 | | 11 | 42 | 15 | 2002 |
| 30 | Mark McFarland **(R)** | 22 | 30 | 15 | 27 | 15 | 31 | 23 | 33 | 16 | 7 | 34 | 18 | 33 | 30 | 22 | 26 | 33 | | | 11 | 16 | 25 | 17 | | | | | | | | | | | | | 1975 |
| 31 | Kasey Kahne | 33 | | | 1 | 2 | | 11 | | | | 40* | 11 | 16 | 22 | | | | 35 | 30 | | | | | | | 4 | 1 | | | 16 | 43 | 8 | 24 | | 8 | 1954 |
| 32 | Stephen Leicht **(R)** | | | | 18 | | | 20 | | | 31 | | 25 | | | | 10 | 13 | 26 | | 33 | | 38 | | 36 | 33 | 35 | 33 | | 23 | 12 | 14 | 19 | 19 | 27 | 27 | 1790 |
| 33 | Auggie Vidovich | | | | | | | | | | | | | | 29 | 33 | 34 | 15 | | 32 | 28 | 25 | 21 | 34 | 21 | 28 | 32 | 43 | 27 | 27 | 20 | 33 | 15 | 38 | 33 | 32 | 1628 |
| 34 | David Reutimann | 29 | | | | | | | 34 | | | | 22 | | | 6 | 8 | 10 | | | | | 14 | 36 | | | 9 | 20 | 39 | | 13 | 20 | | 14 | | 12 | 1598 |
| 35 | Ron Hornaday Jr. | | | | | | 7 | | 17 | 35 | | 14 | | | 5 | | | 20 | | | | 24 | 20 | 23 | | | 3 | | 41 | | | | | 5 | 9 | 36 | 1536 |
| 36 | Steve Wallace | | | | | | 33 | | 12 | | | 28 | | | 38 | 15 | 11 | 25 | | | | 35 | 31 | 30 | | 24 | | | | 21 | 24 | | 20 | 31 | 16 | 22 | 1528 |
| 37 | Tony Stewart | 1 | | | 12 | | | | | | 39 | | 29 | 42 | | | | | 12 | 9 | | | | | | 11 | | 6 | | | 4 | 16 | | 2 | | | 1461 |
| 38 | Casey Mears | | 40 | | | 16 | | 3 | | 8 | | | | 4 | | | | | | 1 | | | | | | 2 | | 16 | | | | 26 | | | | | 1200 |
| 39 | Kurt Busch | | | | | | | 1* | | 4 | | | | 2 | 3 | | | | | 6* | | | | | 1* | 21* | | | | | | | | | | | 1160 |
| 40 | Kertus Davis | DNQ | 42 | | DNQ | 35 | 40 | DNQ | 43 | 41 | 32 | DNQ | 42 | DNQ | 27 | | | 36 | 31 | 34 | 31 | 42 | 39 | | | 40 | 38 | 35 | 42 | 41 | 36 | DNQ | QL | 37 | 40 | DNQ | 1119 |
| 41 | Jason Keller | 11 | 15 | 22 | 16 | 23 | 15 | 28 | 16 | | | DNQ | | | | | | | | | | | | 15 | | | | | | | | | 12 | | | | 1116 |
| 42 | Brian Vickers | 32 | 9 | | | 7 | | | | | 4 | | 12 | | | | | | 2 | | | | | | | 16 | | | | | | | | | | 13 | 1062 |
| 43 | Aaron Fike | 43 | 36 | 28 | 40 | 26 | 18 | 31 | 15 | 31 | 23 | 35 | 43 | DNQ | | 42 | 31 | | | | 30 | | | | | | | | | | | | | | | | 1004 |
| 44 | Mark Martin | | | | | | | 24 | | 5 | | | 4 | 32 | | | | | | | | | | | | **5** | | 3* | | | | | | **4** | | | 973 |
| 45 | Mark Green | 10 | 43 | | 31 | 28 | 22 | 33 | 38 | 15 | 28 | 15 | 27 | | | | QL | | | | | | | | | | | | | | | | QL | | | | 934 |
| 46 | Mike Skinner | | | | | | | | | | | | | | 25 | 26 | | | | | | | | 18 | | 29 | 13 | | 32 | | | 10 | | 21 | DNQ | 24 | 874 |
| 47 | Dave Blaney | | | | | | | | | | | | | 15 | | | | | | 13 | 15 | | | | 40 | | | | 7 | 16 | | 1 | | | | | 854 |
| 48 | Scott Riggs | | | | | | 6 | | | 37 | 11 | | | | | | | | | | 7 | | | | | 19 | | | 10 | **12** | | | | | | | 850 |
| 49 | Shane Huffman | | | | | | | | | | | | | | | | | | | | | | 27 | | | | 31 | | 22 | 36 | 21 | 39 | 5 | 42 | 8 | 37 | 841 |
| 50 | Martin Truex Jr. | | | | | | | | | | 1* | | | 5 | | | | | 8 | 16 | | | | | 6 | | | | | 30* | | | | | | | 835 |
| 51 | Aric Almirola | | | | | | | | | | | 32 | | | 11 | | | **QL** | | | | QL | | 38 | | 27 | 20 | | 18 | | 30 | 15 | | | 13 | | 833 |
| 52 | Casey Atwood | | | | | | | | | | | | | | | | | QL | | | | | | | | | | | 23 | 29 | 17 | 17 | 17 | 18 | 23 | 21 | 814 |
| 53 | Dale Earnhardt Jr. | 17* | | | | | | | | | | | | | | | | | 1* | 15 | | | | | | 1 | | | | | | | | | | 7 | 761 |
| 54 | Bobby Labonte | | | | | | | | | | | | | | | | | | | 12 | | | | | | 15 | | | | | 9 | 22 | | 9 | 34 | 29 | 755 |
| 55 | Tracy Hines **(R)** | 20 | 33 | | 38 | 41 | 13 | 30 | | 43 | 25 | | | | | | | | 29 | 41 | 34 | | | | | | | | | | | | | | | | 752 |
| 56 | David Gilliland **(R)** | | DNQ | | 39 | | | 29 | | 33 | | 30 | | DNQ | | | 1 | | | 26 | | 36 | | 29 | | | | | 30 | | | | | | | | 733 |
| 57 | Joel Kauffman **(R)** | | 27 | 34 | 43 | 32 | 42 | 35 | 23 | 30 | | DNQ | 35 | DNQ | | | 27 | 31 | | | | | | | | | | | | | | | | | | | 716 |
| 58 | Boris Said | | | **2** | | | | | | | | | | 31 | | 39 | 14 | | | | | 18 | | | 8 | | | | | | | | | | | | 663 |
| 59 | Ken Schrader | 36 | | | 17 | 37 | 37 | | | 25 | 22 | | | | | | | | | | | | | | | | 25 | | | 15 | | | | | | | 662 |
| 60 | Ryan Newman | | 2 | | | 39 | | | | | | 5 | 30 | | | | | | | | | | | | 40 | | **6*** | | | | | | | | | | 659 |
| 61 | Stanton Barrett | | | | | | | | 21 | | | 42 | | DNQ | 22 | | | | | | 41 | | 42 | | | | | 32 | 28 | 32 | | | DNQ | | 26 | | 606 |
| 62 | Mike Bliss | | | | | | 36 | 12 | 26 | 38 | | | 31 | | | | | | | | | Wth | 36 | | | | | 30 | | | 27 | | | | | | 596 |
| 63 | Elliott Sadler | 28 | 32 | | | 30 | | | | 32 | | 18 | | 19 | | | | | | 38 | | | | | | | | | | | | | | | | | 550 |
| 64 | Robby Gordon | | | | | | | | | | | | | 40 | | | | | | | | | | | 2 | 3 | | 9 | | | | | | | | | 526 |
| 65 | Kevin Lepage | DNQ | | | 23 | | 19 | | 39 | | | | 36 | | | | | | 19 | 43 | | | | | | | 27 | | | | | | | | | | 523 |
| 66 | Jerry Robertson | | | | | | DNQ | | | 40 | | 29 | | | | DNQ | | | | 36 | | 32 | | | | DNQ | | 39 | 29 | | 42 | | 42 | DNQ | 41 | | 477 |
| 67 | Erin Crocker | | | | | | | | 37 | | | | | | | | | 28 | | | | | 19 | 26 | | | | | | | | | | | 30 | 28 | 474 |
| 68 | Juan Pablo Montoya | | | | | | | | | | | | | | | | | | | | | | | | | | | | | | | | 11 | 28 | 20 | 14 | 438 |
| 69 | Carlos Contreras | | | 11 | | | | | | | | | | | | | | | | | | 29 | | | 32 | | | 38 | | | | | 39 | | | 33 | 437 |
| 70 | Shane Hall | | | | | | DNQ | | 41 | | | DNQ | DNQ | | | 37 | 38 | | 43 | | 40 | 43 | DNQ | 37 | | | 36 | | DNQ | 35 | | | DNQ | | DNQ | | 422 |
| 71 | Ted Musgrave | | | | | | | | | | | | | | | | | | | | | | | 25 | | | | | 21 | | 30 | 24 | | 34 | | | 418 |
| 72 | Brad Keselowski | | | | | | | | | | | | | | | | | | | | | | | | | | DNQ | 37 | 38 | | 26 | 34 | 41 | 29 | | 39 | 414 |
| 73 | Kevin Grubb | | | | | | | | | | | | | | | 25 | 25 | | | | | 33 | 10 | | | | | | 43 | | | | | | | | 413 |
| 74 | A. J. Foyt IV | 42 | 38 | 21 | 37 | 33 | 35 | 41 | | | | DNQ | | | | | | | | | | | | | | | | | | | | | | | | | 400 |
| 75 | P. J. Jones | | | | | | | | | | | | | | | | | | 13 | | | | | 39 | 43 | | | 22 | | | | | | | 21 | | 376 |
| 76 | Paul Tracy | 24 | | 37 | 36 | | | | | | 35 | | | | | | | | 28 | | | | | | | | | 42 | | | | | | | | | 372 |
| 77 | Steve Park | | | | 30 | | | | | | | 41 | 39 | | 37 | | | | | | | | 30 | 32 | | | | | | | | | | | | | 351 |
| 78 | Chris Cook | | | 20 | | | | | | DNQ | | | | | | 28 | 30 | | | | | | | | 34 | | | | DNQ | | | | | | | | 316 |
| 79 | Matt McCall | | | | | | 24 | | 42 | | | | | | 41 | 34 | | | | | | 26 | | | | | | | | | | | | | | | 314 |
| 80 | Justin Diercks | | | | | | | | | | | 43 | | | | 32 | 33 | | | DNQ | | | 28 | 31 | | | | | DNQ | | 32 | | 30 | DNQ | | DNQ | 311 |
| 81 | Cale Gale | | | | | | | | | | | | | | | 20 | | | | 37 | | | | | | 34 | | | | | | | 25 | | | | 309 |
| 82 | Jorge Goeters **(R)** | | | 14 | DNQ | DNQ | 41 | DNQ | 24 | DNQ | | DNQ | | | | | | | | | | | | | | | | | | | | | | DNQ | | 40 | 295 |
| 83 | Derrike Cope | | DNQ | | | | | | | | 40 | | DNQ | | 33 | | | 34 | | DNQ | 36 | | | | | | | DNQ | | 33 | | DNQ | | DNQ | | | 287 |
| 84 | Jimmie Johnson | | | | | | | | | | | | | 7 | | | | | | | | | | | | | | 21 | | | | 42 | | | | | 283 |
| 85 | Steadman Marlin | 41 | | | | DNQ | | | 31 | | 29 | | | | | 38 | | | 39 | | | | | | | | | | | | DNQ | | | | | | 281 |
| 86 | Kevin Conway **(R)** | | | | 28 | 34 | 43 | | | | | DNQ | 28 | DNQ | | | | | | | | | | | | | | | | | | | | | | | 253 |
| 87 | Adrián Fernández | | | 12 | | | | | | | | | | | | | | | | | | | | | 17 | | | | | | | | | | | | 239 |
| 88 | Jason White | | | | | | | | DNQ | | | | | | | 36 | | 30 | | | | 34 | 41 | | | | | | | | | | | | | | 229 |
| 89 | Carl Long | | | | | | | | | | | | | | | 41 | | | | DNQ | 38 | 41 | 34 | 43 | | | DNQ | | | | | | | | | | 224 |
| 90 | Chad Chaffin | DNQ | | | | | | 36 | 22 | | | | | | | | | | | | | | | | | | | | | | | | | 33 | | | 216 |
| 91 | Michel Jourdain Jr. | | | 38 | | | | | | | | | | | | | 18 | | | | | | | | 39 | | | | | | | | | | | | 214 |
| 92 | David Ragan | | | | | | | | | | | | | | | | | | | | | | | | | | | 41 | | 18 | | 36 | | | | | 204 |
| 93 | David Odell | | | | | | | | 25 | | | | | | | 30 | DNQ | | | | | | 40 | | | | | | | | | | | | | | 204 |
| 94 | Ron Fellows | | | 33 | | | | | | | | | | | | | | | | | | | | | 9 | | | | | | | | | | | | 202 |
| 95 | Morgan Shepherd | | | | | | | | | | | | DNQ | 41 | 43 | 40 | 42 | | | | 42 | | | 41 | | | | | | | | | | | | DNQ | 194 |
| 96 | Donnie Neuenberger | 23 | 39 | | | | | | | | 41 | | | | | | | | Wth | | | | | | | | | | | 34 | | | | | | | 180 |
| 97 | Max Papis | | | | | | | | | | | | | | | | | | | | | | | | 14 | | | | | | | | | 40 | | | 164 |
| 98 | Steve Grissom | 21 | | | | | | | | | | | | | | | | | | | | | | | | | 40 | | | | | | | | | | 148 |
| 99 | Marc Goossens | | | 9 | | | | | | | | | | | | | | | | | | | | | | | | | | | | | | | | | 143 |
| 100 | Brent Sherman | | | | | | | | | | | | | | | | | | | | | | | | | | | | | | | | | | 28 | 34 | 140 |
| 101 | Randy LaJoie | | | 41 | | | | | | | | | | 35 | | | | | | | | | | | | | | | | | DNQ | | QL | 41 | | | 138 |
| 102 | Joe Nemechek | 40 | | | | | | | | | | | | | | | | | | | | | | | | | | | | | | | | | | 23 | 137 |
| 103 | Willie Allen | | | | | | | | | | | | | | | | | | | | | | | | | | | | | | | | 28 | | 35 | | 137 |
| 104 | Scott Pruett | | | | | | | | | | | | | | | | | | | | | | | | 10 | | | | | | | | | | | | 134 |
| 105 | Timothy Peters | | | | | | | | | | | | | | | | | | | | | | | | | | | | | | | | 13 | | | | 124 |
| 106 | Chris Wimmer **(R)** | DNQ | DNQ | DNQ | DNQ | DNQ | 39 | DNQ | 40 | | | | | | | | | | | | | | | | | | | | | 43 | | | DNQ | | | | 123 |
| 107 | Jeff Fuller | | | | | | | | | | | | | | | 27 | 41 | | | | | | | | | | | | | | | | | | | | 122 |
| 108 | Brad Coleman | | | | | | | | | | | | | | | 27 | | | | | | | | | | | | | | | 41 | | | | | | 116 |
| 109 | Peyton Sellers | | | | | | | | | | | | | | | | | | | | 37 | | | | | | | | | | | | 33 | | | | 116 |
| 110 | Ron Young | | | | | Wth | | | | | | | | | | | | | | | | 40 | 32 | | | | | | | | | | DNQ | | | | 110 |
| 111 | Todd Bodine | | 37 | | | | | | | | | | | | 36 | | | | | | | | | | | | | | | | | | | | | | 107 |
| 112 | Chris Horn | | | | | | | | | | | | | | | | 37 | 39 | | Wth | | | | | | | | | | | 38 | | | | | | 101 |
| 113 | Brian Simo | | | | | | | | | | | | | | | | | | | | | | | | 22 | | | | | | | | | | | | 97 |
| 114 | Jeff Green | | | | | | | | | | | | | | | | | | | | | | | | | 22 | | | | | | | | | | | 97 |
| 115 | Justin Labonte | | | | | | | | | | | | | | | | | | | | | | | | | | | | | | | | 22 | | | | 97 |
| 116 | Butch Leitzinger | | | | | | | | | | | | | | | | | | | | | | | | 24 | | | | | | | | | | | | 91 |
| 117 | Sam Hornish Jr. | | | | | | | | | | | | | | | | | | | | | | | | | | | | | | | | | | 36 | 43 | 89 |
| 118 | David Stremme | | | | | | | | | | | | | | | | | 26 | | | | | | | | | | | | | | | | | | | 85 |
| 119 | Matt Kobyluck | | | | | | | | | | | | | | | | | | | | 39 | | | | 42 | | | | | | | | | | | | 83 |
| 120 | Kevin Hamlin | | | | | | | | | | | | | | | | | | 27 | | | QL | DNQ | | | | | | | | | | QL | | | | 82 |
| 121 | D. J. Kennington | | | | | | | | | | | | | | | | | | | | | | | | | | DNQ | | | | | | 27 | | DNQ | DNQ | 82 |
| 122 | Darrell Waltrip | | | | | | | | | | | | | | | | | | | | | 28 | | | | | | | | | | | | | | | 79 |
| 123 | Rogelio López | | | 29 | | | | | | | | | | | | | | | | | | | | | | | | | | | | | | | | | 76 |
| 124 | Ryan Moore | | | | | | | | | 29 | | | | | | | | | | | | | | | | | | | | | | | | | | | 76 |
| 125 | Eric McClure | | | | | | | | | | | | | DNQ | | | 43 | | | | | Wth | | | | | 41 | | | | | DNQ | | | | | 74 |
| 126 | Brad Baker | | | | | | | | | | | | | | | | | | | | | | | | | | | | | | | 30 | | | | | 73 |
| 127 | Patrick Goeters | | | 31 | | | | | | | | | | | | | | | | | | | | | | | | | | | | | | | | | 70 |
| 128 | Dwayne Leik | | | | | | | | | | | | | | | | | | 32 | | | | | | | | | | | | | | | | | | 67 |
| 129 | Dexter Bean | | | | | | | | | | | | | | | | | | | | | | | | | DNQ | | | | | | | 32 | | | | 67 |
| 130 | Caleb Holman | | | | | | DNQ | | | | | 33 | DNQ | | | | | | | | | Wth | | | | | DNQ | | | | | | | | | | 64 |
| 131 | Jeremy Mayfield | | 35 | | | | | | | | | | | | | | | | | | | | | | | | | | | | | | | | | | 63 |
| 132 | Spencer Clark | | | | 35 | | | | | | | | | | | | | | | | | | | | | | | | | | | | | | | | 58 |
| 133 | Jamie Mosley | | | | | | | | | | | | | | | | 35 | | | | | | | | | | | | | | | | | | | | 58 |
| 134 | Joey Miller | | | | | | | | | | | | | | | | | | | | | | | | | | | | | | | | 36 | | | | 55 |
| 135 | Chase Pistone | | | | | | | | | | | | | | | | | | | | | 37 | | | | | | | | | | | | | | | 52 |
| 136 | Randy MacDonald | | | | | | | | | | 43 | | | | | | | | | | | 38 | | 35 | | | | | | | | | | | | | 49 |
| 137 | Brad Teague | | | | | | DNQ | | | | | | | | | | | 38 | | | | | DNQ | | | | | | | | | | | | | | 49 |
| 138 | Jimmy Morales | | | 39 | | | | | | | | | | | | | | | | | | | | | | | | | | | | | | | | | 46 |
| 139 | Ricky Craven | | | | | | | | | | | | | | | | | | | | | 39 | | | | | | | | | | | | | | | 46 |
| 140 | Kim Crosby | | | | | | | | | | | | | | | | | 38 | | | | | | | | | | | | | | | | | | | 43 |
| 141 | Shelby Howard | | | | | | | | | | | | | | | | | | | | | | | | | | | | | | | | 40 | | | | 43 |
| 142 | James Hylton | | | | | | | | | | | | | | | | | 41 | | | | | | | | | | | | | | | | | | | 40 |
| 143 | Carlos Pardo | | | 42 | | | | | | | | | | | | | | | | | | | | | | | | | | | | | | | | | 37 |
| 144 | Justin Ashburn | | | | | | | | | | 42 | | | | | | | | | | | | | | | | | | | | | | | | | | 37 |
| 145 | Jeff Spraker | | | | | | | | | | | | | | | | | | 42 | | | | | | | | | | | | | | | | | | 37 |
| 146 | Sean Caisse | | | | | | | | | | | | | | | | | | | | | | | | | | | | | 42 | | | | | | | 37 |
| 147 | Scott Lynch | | | | | 43 | | | | | | | | | | | | | | | | | | | | | | | | | | | | | | | 34 |
| 148 | Josh Richeson | | | | | | | | | | | | | | | | | | | | | | 43 | | | | | | | | | | | | | | 34 |
| 149 | Jennifer Jo Cobb | | | | | | | | | | | | | | | | | | | | | | | | | | | | | | 43 | | | | | | 34 |
| 150 | Tim Schendel | | | | | | | | | | | | | | | | | | | | | | | | | | | | | | | | 43 | | | | 34 |
| 151 | Brian Keselowski | | | | | | | | | | | | | | | | | | | | | | | | | | | | | | | | | | 43 | | 34 |
| 152 | John Hayden | | | | | | | | | | | | | | | DNQ | DNQ | 32 | | | | | | | | | | | | | | | | | | | |
| 153 | Jerick Johnson | | | | | | | | | | | | | | | | | 37 | | | | | | | | | | | | | | | | | | | |
| 154 | Joey McCarthy | | | | | | | | | | | | | | | | | | | | 43 | | | | | | | | | | | | | | | | |
| 155 | Larry Hollenbeck | DNQ | | | | | | | | | | | | | | | | | | | | | | | | | | | | | | | | | | | |
| 156 | Eduardo Goeters | | | DNQ | | | | | | | | | | | | | | | | | | | | | | | | | | | | | | | | | |
| 157 | Stan Silva Jr. | | | DNQ | | | | | | | | | | | | | | | | | | | | | DNQ | | | | | | | | | | | | |
| 158 | Marc Mitchell | | | | | | | | | DNQ | | | | | | | | | | | | | | | | | | | | | | | | | | | |
| 159 | Stan Boyd | | | | | | | | | | | | | | | | DNQ | | | | | | | | | | | | | | | | | | | | |
| 160 | Richard Landreth | | | | | | | | | | | | | | | | | | | | | DNQ | | | | | | | | | | | DNQ | | | | |
| 161 | Todd Shafer | | | | | | | | | | | | | | | | | | | | | | | DNQ | | | | | | | | | | | | | |
| 162 | Eduardo Troconis | | | | | | | | | | | | | | | | | | | | | | | | DNQ | | | | | | | | | | | | |
| 163 | John Finger | | | | | | | | | | | | | | | | | | | | | | | | DNQ | | | | | | | | | | | | |
| 164 | Josh Krug | | | | | | | | | | | | | | | | | | | | | | | | | | | | DNQ | | | | | | DNQ | | |
| 165 | Hermie Sadler | | | | | | | | | | | | | | | | | | | | | | | | | | | | DNQ | | | | QL | | | | |
| 166 | Robert Richardson Jr. | | | | | | | | | | | | | | | | | | | | | | | | | | | | | | | DNQ | | DNQ | | DNQ | |
| 167 | Chuck Barnes Jr. | | | | | | | | | | | | | | | | | | | | | | | | | | | | | | | | DNQ | | | | |
| 168 | Brett Rowe | | | | | | | | | | | | | | | | | | | | | | | | | | | | | | | | DNQ | | | DNQ | |
| 169 | Kraig Kinser | | | | | | | | | | | | | | | | | | | | | | | | | | | | | | | | | | | DNQ | |
| 170 | Dawayne Bryan | | | | | | | | | | | | | | | | | | | | | | | | | | | | | | | | | | | DNQ | |
| 171 | Trevor Boys | | | | | | | | | | | | | | | | | | | | | | | | | | | | | | | | | | | DNQ | |
| 172 | Hank Parker Jr. | | | | | | | | | | | | | | | | | QL | | | | | | | | | | | | | | | | | | | |
| 173 | Dennis Setzer | | | | | | | | | | | | | | | | | QL | | | | QL | | | | | | | | | | | | | | | |
| 174 | Brandon Miller | | | | | | | | | | | | | | | | | | | | | | | | | | | | | | | | QL | | | | |
| 175 | Peter Shepherd III | | | | | | | | | | | | | | | | | | | | | | | | | | | | | | | | QL | | | | |
| Pos | Driver | DAY | CAL | MXC | LVS | ATL | BRI | TEX | NSH | PHO | TAL | RCH | DAR | CLT | DOV | NSH | KEN | MIL | DAY | CHI | NHA | MAR | GTY | IRP | GLN | MCH | BRI | CAL | RCH | DOV | KAN | CLT | MEM | TEX | PHO | HOM | Pts |

=== Declaring for points in one series: Rules change for 2011 ===
This was the fifth-to-last season where Cup Series drivers could run for points in another series. NASCAR implemented this change after Cup drivers were winning the Busch/Nationwide championships over the series regulars for 5 years straight (2006-2010). If the change had been implemented for the 2006 season, Menard would have been the champion. The rest of the top 10 in the standings would have been Johnny Sauter in 2nd, Kenny Wallace (who finished 11th in points), John Andretti (12th), Jason Leffler (13th), Jon Wood (14th), Ashton Lewis (15th), Stacy Compton (16th), Todd Kluever (17th), and Danny O'Quinn Jr. (19th).

== Rookies ==
- A. J. Foyt IV – Released midseason from the #38 Great Clips team after team switched from Dodge to Chevrolet (Foyt IV is under contract to Dodge Motorsports and could not break the contract)
- Joel Kauffman – Fired midseason from the #12 SuperCuts Dodge
- Todd Kluever – #06 3M Ford
- Mark McFarland – Fired midseason from the #88 United States Navy Chevrolet
- Burney Lamar – Fired midseason from the #77 Dollar General Chevrolet
- Danny O’Quinn Jr. – #50 World Financial Group Ford
- Chris Wimmer

Also, John Andretti was officially considered a Busch Series rookie of the year contender for 2006, even though he is a Winston/Nextel Cup veteran.

ROTY favorite Lamar was released early from his ride at KHI while leading the standings. Eventually, the ROTY came down to a fight between NEXTEL Cup veteran John Andretti and former USAR Pro Cup driver Danny O'Quinn Jr. Eventually, O'Quinn Jr., despite being pulled from his ride for two races in favor of David Ragan to prepare him for his full time Cup season in 2007, still managed to hold off Andretti to win the award by only a single point. Another preseason favorite and 2005 NCTS Rookie of the Year, Todd Kluever, struggled in his transition to the Busch Series. Another USAR driver, Mark McFarland, had an up and down year and was replaced by Shane Huffman. Joel Kauffman and Chris Wimmer made bids for ROTY, but were released from their rides. A. J. Foyt IV, in his transition to stock cars, was released due to a Dodge development deal.

== See also ==
- 2006 NASCAR Nextel Cup Series
- 2006 NASCAR Craftsman Truck Series
- 2006 ARCA Re/Max Series
- 2006 NASCAR Whelen Modified Tour
- 2006 NASCAR Whelen Southern Modified Tour
