= Roush Racing: Driver X =

US television program

- Genre: Auto racing
- Country of origin: United States
- Original language: English
- No. of seasons: 1
- No. of episodes: 13

Production
- Production company: Brainbox Entertainment

Original release
- Network: Discovery Channel
- Release: October 24, 2005 – February 6, 2006

Roush Racing: Driver X is a television show on the Discovery Channel that documented the selection of NASCAR drivers for Roush Racing. During occasional years, Jack Roush, the owner of Roush Racing, auditioned drivers from around the world to hire a driver in the NASCAR Craftsman Truck Series. This audition was informally known as The Gong Show. In 2005, the Discovery Channel decided to film and air these tests as Roush Racing: Driver X. The show aired every Monday at 7:00 p.m. EST and at 11:00 p.m. EST/6:00 p.m. CST and at 10:00 p.m. CST on the Discovery Channel.

Roush Racing: Driver X was produced for Discovery Channel by Brainbox Entertainment.

== Background ==
For many years, Roush Racing recruited its developmental drivers through an elimination style of testing entitled The Gong Show. The first competition was held in 1985 for Roush's road racing program. The first combine for the stock car program was held in 1999. The process would begin when Roush solicited applications from thousands of drivers from all levels or racing. They would then put through a series of tests, gauging not only driving skills, but also public relations talent and personality traits. Eventually, the field would be narrowed down to an elite group who are allowed to race Roush vehicles, often Truck Series vehicles, in an attempt to assess driving ability. Those with the fastest times progress, and ultimately the best drivers are awarded with a contract to drive for Roush in the Truck Series or Busch Series (now Xfinity Series). Winners of the program include Kurt Busch, Carl Edwards and David Ragan.

The term "Gong Show" comes from the 1970s talent show spoof "The Gong Show."

== 2005 competition ==
In 2005, the process was documented in the Discovery Channel television series Roush Racing: Driver X, which followed the stories of those involved in the 2005 Gong Show.

=== Drivers ===
- Justin Allgaier
- Tim Andrews
- Chuck Barnes
- Sam Beam
- Jason Boyd
- Jeff Choquette
- Johnny Clark
- Erik Darnell
- Sondi Eden
- Nevin George
- James Gue
- Jason Hogan
- Matthew Jaskol
- Bud Kaeding
- Travis Kittleson
- Michael Lewis
- Scott Lynch
- Matt McCall
- Danny O'Quinn
- Christi Passmore
- Michael Pickens
- Bubba Pollard
- David Ragan
- Peter Shepherd
- Auggie Vidovich II
- Nathan Werner

== Results and other development deals ==
The 2005 winner was Erik Darnell, who won a full-time ride in the NASCAR Craftsman Truck Series for Roush Racing in the #99 Ford F-150. He scored two wins over three Truck Series seasons with Roush, and would later run seven races in the Cup Series for fellow Ford team Yates Racing in 2009. David Ragan drove a limited number of races in the #6 Ford F-150 in 2006. He earned two Cup Series victories with Roush and Front Row Motorsports before retiring at the end of the 2019 season. Danny O'Quinn won a ride in the #50 World Financial Group Ford Fusion for Roush in the next level up in NASCAR, the Busch Series.

Pete Shepherd was signed to a driver development deal with Roush Racing, running in the ARCA RE/MAX Series in 2006. Also, Matt McCall signed with Yates Racing (then known as Robert Yates Racing) after the show concluded to co-pilot the #90 Ford in the NASCAR Busch Series for 2006. He is currently a crew chief for Chip Ganassi Racing. In 2008, Justin Allgaier won the ARCA Series Championship, and signed a deal to race for Penske Racing in the Nationwide Series (formerly the Busch Series). He went on to get his first win in 2010, and later competed for HScott Motorsports in the Cup Series; he currently races for JR Motorsports in the now-O'Reilly Auto Parts Series and Cup Series and won the 2024 championship for the team.

== Previous Gong Show winners ==
Year	Winner	Runner(s) Up
2004	Todd Kluever	Erik Darnell, Danny O'Quinn, David Ragan, Bobby Santos III, Matt McCall, David Gilliland, Kevin Conway, Timothy Peters, Regan Smith, Auggie Vidovich II, Clay Rogers, Michael Pickens, Nate Monteith, Wade Day, Jason Boyd, Dustin Skinner, Josh Krug, Jason Hogan, Chris Bristol, Morty Buckles
2002	Carl Edwards	
2000	Chuck Hossfeld and Nathan Haseleu	Scott Riggs, Timothy Peters
1999	Kurt Busch	Jon Wood
