= 2026 Speedweeks =

Car-racing event at Daytona, Florida, USA

The 2026 Speedweeks Presented by AdventHealth at Daytona International Speedway marks the commencement of the NASCAR season, featuring a series of events that will lead up to the 2026 Daytona 500.

== Background ==
Daytona International Speedway, the track where Speedweeks took place

Speedweeks, officially known as "Speedweeks Presented by AdventHealth," is an annual series of racing events held at Daytona International Speedway in Daytona Beach, Florida. This event traditionally kicks off the NASCAR season, culminating with the Daytona 500.

== Events ==
=== Wednesday, February 11 ===
==== Daytona 500 Practice 1 ====
The first practice session for the 2026 Daytona 500 took place at 10:00 A.M EST. Austin Cindric led the session, clocking a fastest lap of 48.025 seconds at a speed of 187.402 mph (301.594 km/h).

Corey LaJoie, driving for RFK Racing's No. 99 car, was the fastest among the "open" competitors, posting a lap of 48.253 seconds and a speed of 186.517 mph (300.170 km/h).

The session primarily consisted of single-car runs as teams focused on shakedowns in preparation for the upcoming qualifying events. There was limited drafting practice near the end of the session.

==== Daytona 500 Qualifying ====
Kyle Busch secured the pole position for the Daytona 500 during Wednesday's single-car qualifying session, clocking a lap time of 49.006 seconds at a speed of 183.651 mph (295.558 km/h).

Joining Busch on the front row is Chase Briscoe of Joe Gibbs Racing for the second straight year, who posted a lap time of 49.022 seconds and had a speed of 183.587 mph (295.455 km/h).

The "Open" cars locked in is reigning Craftsman Truck Series champion Corey Heim and Justin Allgaier, driving for 23XI Racing and JR Motorsports respectively, secured their spots in the Daytona 500 based on their qualifying speeds.

=== Thursday, February 12 ===
==== General Tire 200 Practice ====
The first and only practice session was held at 4:00 PM, and lasted for 55 minutes.

Jake Finch, driving for Nitro Motorsports, would set the fastest time in the session, with a lap of 48.878, and a speed of 184.132 miles per hour (296.332 km/h).

==== Fresh From Florida 250 Practice ====
The first and only practice session was held on Thursday, February 12, at 5:00 PM EST, and lasted for 50 minutes.

Kaden Honeycutt, driving for Tricon Garage, would set the fastest time in the session, with a lap time of 48.439, and a speed of 185.801 miles per hour (299.018 km/h).

==== America 250 Florida Duel at Daytona ====
In the Duels, Kyle Busch started on the pole for Duel 1 while Chase Briscoe started on the pole for Duel 2. During the first Duel, RFK Racing dominated the majority of the race, seeking to help Corey LaJoie clinch among the "Open" cars, as he had not qualified for the race. Unfortunately for LaJoie, a last lap wreck ended his chances of making the 500. Casey Mears, despite a spin earlier in the race, dodged LaJoie during the wreck, clinching his spot into the race, as well as making his first Daytona 500 start since 2019's race. During the second Duel, which ran caution-free, Chase Elliott finished 0.065 seconds ahead of Carson Hocevar. Anthony Alfredo originally got into the 500 as the last open car, but due to tech finding cooling hoses not secured, B. J. McLeod got in instead.

=== Friday, February 13 ===
==== General Tire 200 Qualifying ====
Qualifying was held on Friday, February 13, at 1:30 PM EST. Gus Dean, driving for Nitro Motorsports, would score the pole for the race after setting the fastest time between the overall groups, with a lap of 49.133, and a speed of 183.176 miles per hour (294.793 km/h). Jake Bollman, who originally won the pole, was disqualified from his starting position after discovering a height violation during post-qualifying inspection.

==== Fresh From Florida 250 Qualifying ====
Ty Majeski would score the pole after advancing from the preliminary round and setting the fastest time in Round 2, with a lap of 50.881, and a speed of 176.883 miles per hour (284.666 km/h).

==== United Rentals 300 Practice ====
Practice took place at 4:35 P.M EST. Jeb Burton topped the session, clocking a fastest lap of 48.735 seconds at a speed of 184.672 mph (297.201 km/h).

==== Daytona 500 Practice 2 ====
The second practice session for the Daytona 500 took place at 5:35 P.M EST. Austin Dillon topped the session, clocking a fastest lap of 46.006 seconds at a speed of 195.627 mph (314.831 km/h).

==== Fresh From Florida 250 ====
In a wild finish, Chandler Smith, driving for Front Row Motorsports, would make a four-wide tri-oval pass underneath John Hunter Nemechek on the final lap to earn his 8th career NASCAR Craftsman Truck Series win, and his first of the season. Gio Ruggiero finished second, and Christian Eckes finished third. Ty Majeski and Nemechek rounded out the top five, while Ricky Stenhouse Jr., Brenden Queen, Kaden Honeycutt, Tyler Ankrum, and Stewart Friesen rounded out the top ten. The race would also produce the most lead changes in series history, with 32 lead changes among 12 drivers. This was the first race for Ram as a manufacturer since 2012, and the first NASCAR sanctioned race for Tony Stewart since 2016. Alongside Stewart, Travis Pastrana and Cleetus McFarland were also notables for the event.

=== Saturday, February 14 ===
==== United Rentals 300 Qualifying ====
Austin Hill, would score the pole after advancing from the preliminary round and setting the fastest time in Round 2, with a lap of 49.390, and a speed of 182.223 miles per hour (293.259 km/h). He would beat his teammate Jesse Love by 0.001 seconds.

==== General Tire 200 ====
The race featured several cautions, including one for Mini Tyrrell's spin and another for Alli Owens' engine blowout. Isabella Robusto led 11 laps, the most by a female driver in ARCA competition since 1989, but ultimately finished 37th due to mechanical issues. In the end, Gio Ruggiero took the win in the season opener, leading the final six laps after a wild wreck involving Jake Finch and Gus Dean sent the race into overtime. The victory marks his first superspeedway win and the first for Joe Gibbs Racing in the ARCA Menards Series.

==== Daytona 500 Practice 3 ====
The third and final practice session for the Daytona 500 took place at 3:00 P.M EST. Ryan Preece topped the session, clocking a fastest lap of 46.558 seconds at a speed of 192.672 mph (310.076 km/h).

==== United Rentals 300 ====
The race started with an early caution. Austin Hill won the first stage under the yellow due to a spin by Corey Day. Hill continued his dominance at Superspeedway tracks, winning the next stage, which led to him winning the race over teammate Jesse Love. The win was Hill's fourth in five seasons at Daytona.

=== Sunday, February 15 ===
==== Daytona 500 ====
NASCAR moved the Daytona 500 start time forward an hour to 1:30 p.m. eastern time due to the threat of rain in the evening. Zane Smith won stage one after staying out in the middle of pit cycles, as well as getting his first career stage win. Stage two featured a battle between polesitter Kyle Busch and Kyle Larson for the lead for the majority of the stage. Bubba Wallace, however, won the second stage, after narrowly avoiding "The Big One", caused by Denny Hamlin tapping Justin Allgaier's rear bumper, triggering a 20-car pileup on the tri-oval. After a restart with five laps remaining, Tyler Reddick escaped two wrecks and passed Chase Elliott for the win exiting turn four.
