= Ryan Mathews =

Ryan Mathews, Matthews or Mattheus may refer to:

- Ryan Mathews (American football) (born 1987), American football running back
- Ryan Mattheus (born 1983), American baseball player
- Ryan Mathews (racing driver) (born 1980), American racecar driver
- Ryan Matthews (90210), a character on the television show 90210
