= Danny O'Quinn Jr. =

American racing driver (born 1985)

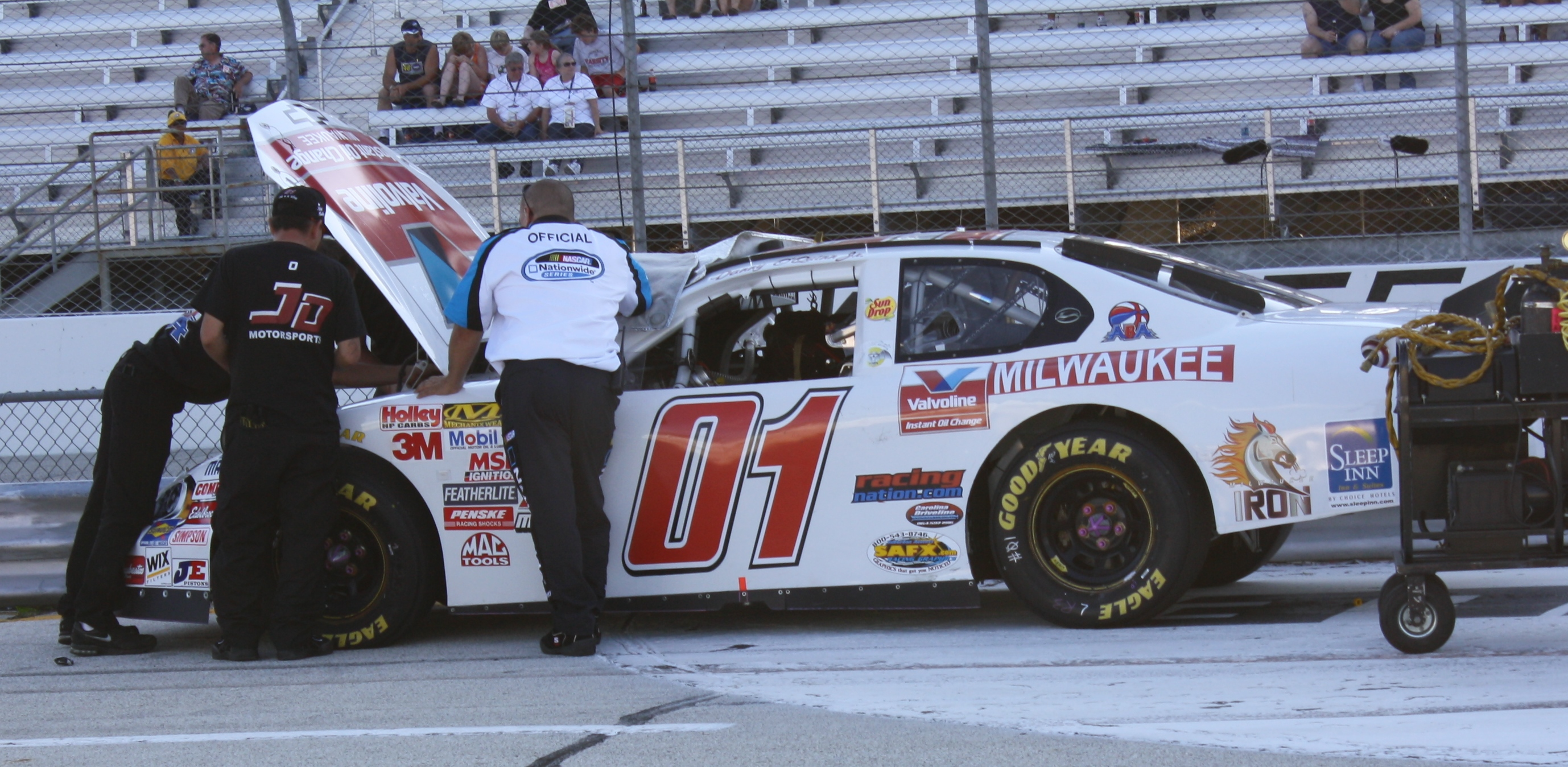
- O'Quinn in the No. 01 in 2009
- Born: Daniel Lee O'Quinn Jr. May 7, 1985 (age 41); Coeburn, Virginia, U.S.
- Achievements: 2002 UARA-Stars Champion; Innagural UARA-Stars Champion (2002)
- Awards: 2003 USAR Hooters Pro Cup Series Southern Division Rookie of the Year; 2006 Busch Series Rookie of the Year

NASCAR O'Reilly Auto Parts Series career
- 106 races run over 6 years
- 2011 position: 63rd
- Best finish: 19th (2006, 2009)
- First race: 2006 Hershey's Kissables 300 (Daytona)
- Last race: 2011 Dollar General 300 (Chicago)
Wins	Top tens	Poles
0	5	0

NASCAR FedEx Freight Truck Series career
- 2 races run over 1 year
- Best finish: 65th (2007)
- First race: 2007 Toyota Tundra 200 (Nashville)
- Last race: 2007 O'Reilly 200 (Bristol)
Wins	Top tens	Poles
0	1	0

Daniel Lee O'Quinn Jr. (born May 7, 1985) is an American professional stock car racer from Coeburn, Virginia. Now retired, he competed in the NASCAR Nationwide Series and was a winner of the Roush Racing: Driver X competition.

== Background ==
O'Quinn began racing go-karts at the age of seven and won four championships. He won over 130 races, and one Tennessee state championship between 1992 and 1998.

In 1999, O'Quinn became the Street Stock rookie of the year at Lonesome Pine Raceway. He moved up to a late model car in 2000 and won the track championship and the Rookie of the Year award. In 2001, he raced both at Lonesome Pine and the ARA series. He had three wins and four poles. He also attended the University of Virginia's College at Wise in 2003–2005, but put his collegiate pursuits on hold as his professional racing career took off.

In 2002, O'Quinn won the UARA late model touring series national championship.

== Move to national driver ==
O'Quinn moved up to the USAR Hooters Pro Cup (Southern Series) in 2003, and became the Southern Series Rookie of the Year. In 2004, he won the Food City 250 at his home race track of Lonesome Pine Raceway in Coeburn, Virginia. He became the youngest driver to win in series history, and finished seventh overall in points. In 2005, he had six starts in the ARCA series and three sixth-place finishes.

== NASCAR career ==
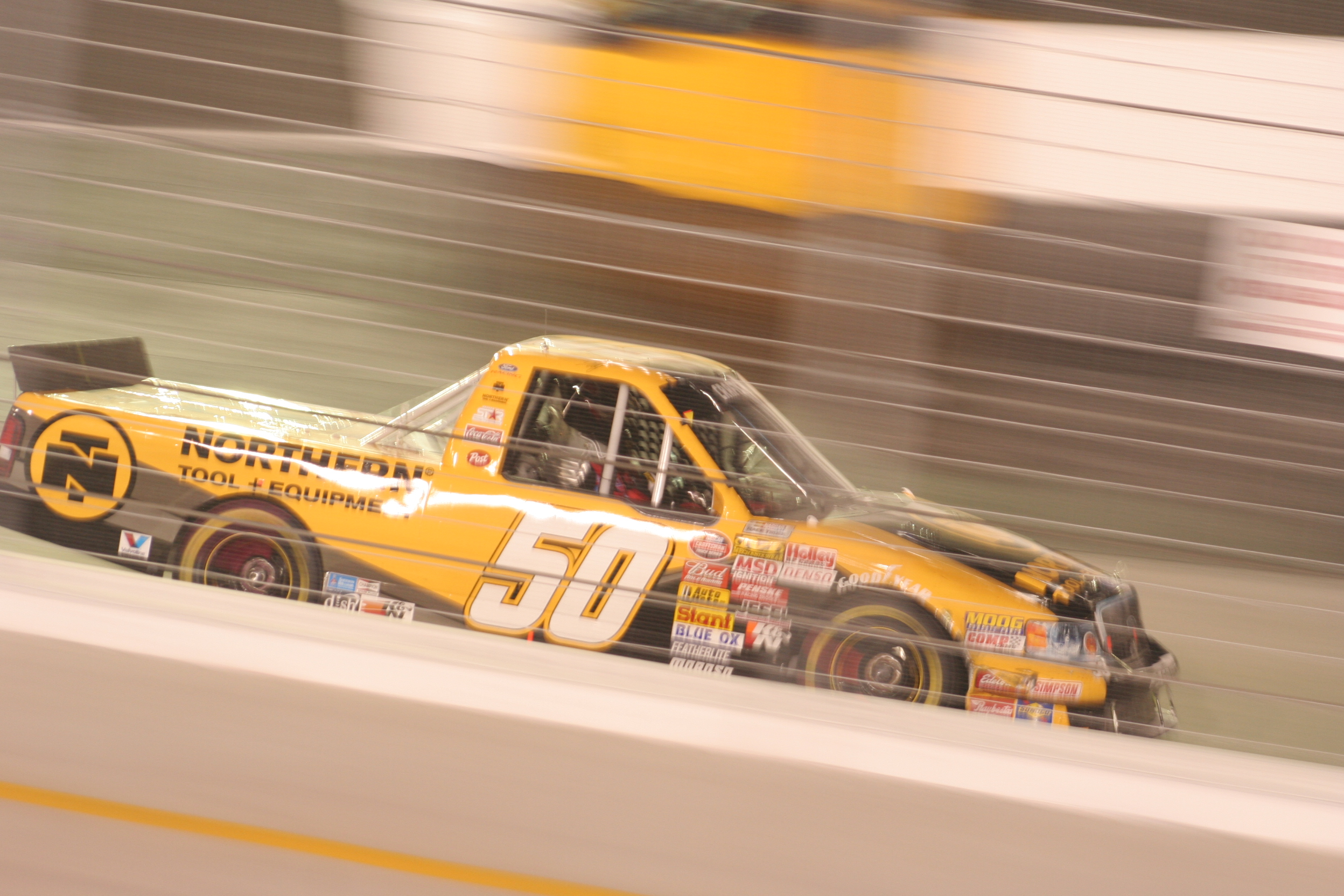
Quinn racing in the O'Reilly 200 at Bristol Motor Speedway in 2007

In the fall of 2005, O'Quinn was a contestant on Roush Racing: Driver X. He was ultimately runner-up in the competition, but skipped the Craftsman Truck Series and proceeded directly to the Busch Series with Driver X winner Erik Darnell being inked to the Roush truck contract.

In 2006, O'Quinn raced the World Financial Group No. 50 Ford in the Busch Series. He got his first top-ten finish at Nashville Superspeedway after starting second, and followed it up with top-tens at Milwaukee, ORP, Memphis and Charlotte, where he scored a career best finish of fifth. O'Quinn was named Busch Series Rookie of the Year after the 2006 Season Finale at Homestead-Miami Speedway beating former NASCAR Winston Cup driver John Andretti and teammate Todd Kluever, among others, for the award. In 2007, O'Quinn made occasional starts in No. 17 Dish Network Ford and also ran part-time with Mac Hill Motorsports in the No. 56 Chevy.

After driving part-time in 2007 in selected races with Roush Fenway Racing. O'Quinn announced his departure from the team, due to a lack of sponsorship which prohibited from landing a full-time ride with the team. He then signed on to drive the No. 56 Chevy for Mac Hill Motorsports part-time for the remainder of the year. He made only one start in 2008 for Mac Hill, where he finished 28th at Richmond. He ended the year driving the No. 35 Team Rensi Motorsports Ford on a part-time basis, with a best finish of 40th. He signed with JD Motorsports in 2009, and drove the No. 01 Sun Drop Chevrolet Impala. Following the Food City 250 on August 21, 2009, O'Quinn left the JD Motorsports team. He finished the year by start and parking for K-Automotive Motorsports and Fitz Racing. In 2011, O'Quinn joined Go Green Racing, where he ran five races.

After O'Quinn's NASCAR career stalled, he moved back to Virginia to help run the family trailer business. O'Quinn also occasionally raced at the Lonesome Pine Raceway.

== Motorsports career results ==
=== NASCAR ===
(key) (Bold – Pole position awarded by qualifying time. Italics – Pole position earned by points standings or practice time. * – Most laps led.)

==== Nationwide Series ====
NASCAR Nationwide Series results
Year	Team	No.	Make	1	2	3	4	5	6	7	8	9	10	11	12	13	14	15	16	17	18	19	20	21	22	23	24	25	26	27	28	29	30	31	32	33	34	35	NNSC	Pts	Ref
2006	Roush Fenway Racing	50	Ford	DAY; 18	CAL; 31	MXC; 26	LVS; 25	ATL; 25	BRI; 11	TEX; 32	NSH; 14	PHO; 14	TAL; 38	RCH; 20	DAR; 38	CLT; 22	DOV; 24	NSH; 10	KEN; 23	MLW; 7	DAY; 41	CHI; 31	NHA; 29	MAR; 22	GTY; 24	IRP; 6	GLN; 25	MCH; 20	BRI; 26	CAL	RCH; 14	DOV	KAN; 18	CLT; 5	MEM; 9	TEX; 30	PHO; 32	HOM; 35	19th	3163	
2007	Mac Hill Motorsports	56	Chevy	DAY	CAL	MXC	LVS	ATL	BRI; 21	NSH; 23	TEX	PHO						NSH; 29											BRI; 18	CAL	RCH; 27	DOV	KAN	CLT	MEM; 15	TEX	PHO	HOM	48th	952	
2007	Roush Fenway Racing	17	Ford										TAL; 11	RCH	DAR	CLT	DOV		KEN; 38	MLW																			48th	952	
2007	Roush Fenway Racing	26	Ford																		NHA; 22	DAY	CHI	GTY															48th	952	
2007	Stanton Barrett Motorsports	30	Chevy																						IRP; 22	CGV	GLN	MCH											48th	952	
2008	Mac Hill Motorsports	56	Chevy	DAY; DNQ	CAL	LVS	ATL	BRI; DNQ	NSH	TEX	PHO	MXC	TAL	RCH	DAR	CLT	DOV	NSH													RCH; 24	DOV	KAN						91st	205	
2008	Day Enterprise Racing	05	Chevy																KEN; DNQ	MLW	NHA	DAY	CHI	GTY	IRP	CGV	GLN	MCH	BRI	CAL									91st	205	
2008	Team Rensi Motorsports	35	Ford																															CLT; 40	MEM; 42	TEX; 42	PHO; 43	HOM; DNQ	91st	205	
2009	JD Motorsports	0	Chevy	DAY; 23																																			19th	2404	
2009	JD Motorsports	01	Chevy		CAL; 33	LVS; 18	BRI; 37	TEX; 29	NSH; 32	PHO; 21	TAL; 37	RCH; 20	DAR; 27	CLT; 24	DOV; 21	NSH; 18	KEN; 18	MLW; 27	NHA; 26	DAY; 30	CHI; 29	GTY; 18	IRP; 34	IOW; 24	GLN; 25	MCH; 31	BRI; 32	CGV	ATL	RCH									19th	2404	
2009	Whitney Motorsports	26	Dodge																												DOV; 34								19th	2404	
2009	SK Motorsports	44	Chevy																													KAN; 43							19th	2404	
2009	SK Motorsports	07	Chevy																														CAL; 34	CLT; 37	MEM; 42	TEX; 35	PHO; 35	HOM; 35	19th	2404	
2010	D'Hondt Humphrey Motorsports	90	Chevy	DAY	CAL; DNQ	LVS; 38	BRI; 41	NSH; 43	PHO; 42	TEX; 39	TAL	RCH; DNQ	DAR; 40		CLT; 38	NSH; 38	KEN; 41	ROA	NHA; 37	DAY	CHI; 41	GTY; 37	IRP; 38	IOW; 38	GLN	MCH			ATL; 38	RCH	DOV; 37	KAN; 39	CAL; 35	CLT	GTY; 42	TEX; DNQ	PHO; 37	HOM; DNQ	42nd	1043	
2010	Go Green Racing	39	Ford											DOV; DNQ																									42nd	1043	
2010	Baker Curb Racing	27	Ford																								BRI; 16	CGV											42nd	1043	
2011	Go Green Racing	39	Ford	DAY	PHO	LVS	BRI	CAL	TEX; 27	TAL	NSH; 26	RCH	DAR	DOV	IOW	CLT	CHI	MCH	ROA	DAY	KEN	NHA																	63rd	48	
2011	Go Green Racing	04	Ford																				NSH; 42	IRP; 36	IOW	GLN	CGV	BRI	ATL	RCH	CHI; 39	DOV	KAN; DNQ	CLT	TEX	PHO	HOM		63rd	48	

==== Craftsman Truck Series ====
NASCAR Craftsman Truck Series results
Year	Team	No.	Make	1	2	3	4	5	6	7	8	9	10	11	12	13	14	15	16	17	18	19	20	21	22	23	24	25	NCTC	Pts	Ref
2007	Roush Fenway Racing	50	Ford	DAY	CAL	ATL	MAR	KAN	CLT	MFD	DOV	TEX	MCH	MLW	MEM	KEN	IRP	NSH; 17	BRI; 10	GTW	NHA	LVS	TAL	MAR	ATL	TEX	PHO	HOM	65th	246	

=== ARCA Re/Max Series ===
(key) (Bold – Pole position awarded by qualifying time. Italics – Pole position earned by points standings or practice time. * – Most laps led.)

ARCA Re/Max Series results
Year	Team	No.	Make	1	2	3	4	5	6	7	8	9	10	11	12	13	14	15	16	17	18	19	20	21	22	23	ARMC	Pts	Ref
2005	Bob Aiello	62	Ford	DAY	NSH	SLM	KEN; 37	TOL	LAN	MIL	POC																39th	965	
2005	Danny O'Quinn Jr.	32	Ford									MCH; 6	KAN	KEN; 16	BLN	POC	GTW; 6	LER	NSH; 6	MCH; Wth	ISF	TOL	DSF	CHI; 12	SLM	TAL	39th	965	
2006	Roush Fenway Racing	39	Ford	DAY; 37	NSH	SLM	WIN	KEN	TOL	POC	MCH	KAN	KEN	BLN	POC	GTW	NSH	MCH	ISF	MIL	TOL	DSF	CHI	SLM	TAL	IOW	174th	45	

=== CARS Late Model Stock Car Tour ===
(key) (Bold – Pole position awarded by qualifying time. Italics – Pole position earned by points standings or practice time. * – Most laps led. ** – All laps led.)

CARS Late Model Stock Car Tour results
Year	Team	No.	Make	1	2	3	4	5	6	7	8	9	10	11	12	13	CLMSCTC	Pts	Ref
2017	Wade Lopez	96	Ford	CON	DOM	DOM	HCY	HCY	BRI; 25	AND	ROU	TCM	ROU	HCY; 7	CON; 21	SBO	28th	46	
2018	Wade Lopez	96	Ford	TCM	MYB	ROU	HCY	BRI; 16	ACE	CCS	KPT; 21	HCY	WKS	OCS	SBO		39th	29	
