= 2006 Dover 400 =

Race details
- Race 28 of 36 in the 2006 NASCAR Nextel Cup Series
- 2006 Dover 400 program cover
- Date: September 24, 2006
- Location: Dover International Speedway, Dover, Delaware
- Course: Permanent racing facility
- Course length: 1 miles (1.6 km)
- Distance: 400 laps, 400 mi (643.737 km)
- Weather: Temperatures up to 82.4 °F (28.0 °C); wind speeds up to 26.35 miles per hour (42.41 km/h)
- Average speed: 111.966 mph (180.192 km/h)
- Attendance: 145,000

Pole position
| Driver | Jeff Gordon | Hendrick Motorsports |
- Time: 23.053

Most laps led
| Driver | Matt Kenseth | Roush Racing |
- Laps: 215

Winner
| No. 31 | Jeff Burton | Richard Childress Racing |

Television in the United States
- Network: Turner Network Television
- Announcers: Bill Weber, Benny Parsons, Wally Dallenbach Jr.
- Nielsen ratings: 3.8 (Final)

Radio in the United States
- Radio: Motor Racing Network
- Booth announcers: Joe Moore, Barney Hall
- Turn announcers: Mike Bagley, Dan Hubbard, Dave Moody, Jeff Streigle

The 2006 Dover 400 was the twenty-eighth stock car race of the 2006 NASCAR Nextel Cup Series and the second in the ten-race season-ending Chase for the Nextel Cup. It was held on September 24, 2006 at Dover International Speedway in Dover, Delaware, before a crowd of 145,000. The 400-lap race was won by Jeff Burton of Richard Childress Racing, who started from 19th position. Carl Edwards of Roush Racing finished second and Jeff Gordon of Hendrick Motorsports came in third.

Although Gordon won the pole position, he was immediately passed by Ryan Newman at the start of the race. 27 laps later Carl Edwards took the lead for 21 laps. David Stremme briefly held the lead until Elliott Sadler moved in front of him to claim the position, only to lose it to Matt Kenseth on lap 74. Kenseth led more laps than any other driver (215), during which Reed Sorenson and Greg Biffle also led. Burton close the gap to Kenseth by the 375th lap and battled him for the position over the next 20 laps until he moved ahead on lap 395. Burton maintained the lead for the remaining five laps to win the race. There were ten cautions and twelve lead changes by nine different drivers during the race.

It was Burton's first win of the 2006 season, the 18th of his career, and it ended a 175-race winless streak. The result advanced him to the lead of the Drivers' Championship, six points ahead of Gordon (who moved up to second). Chevrolet maintained its lead in the Manufacturers' Championship, 42 points ahead of Ford and 45 in front of Dodge with seven races left in the season.

== Background ==
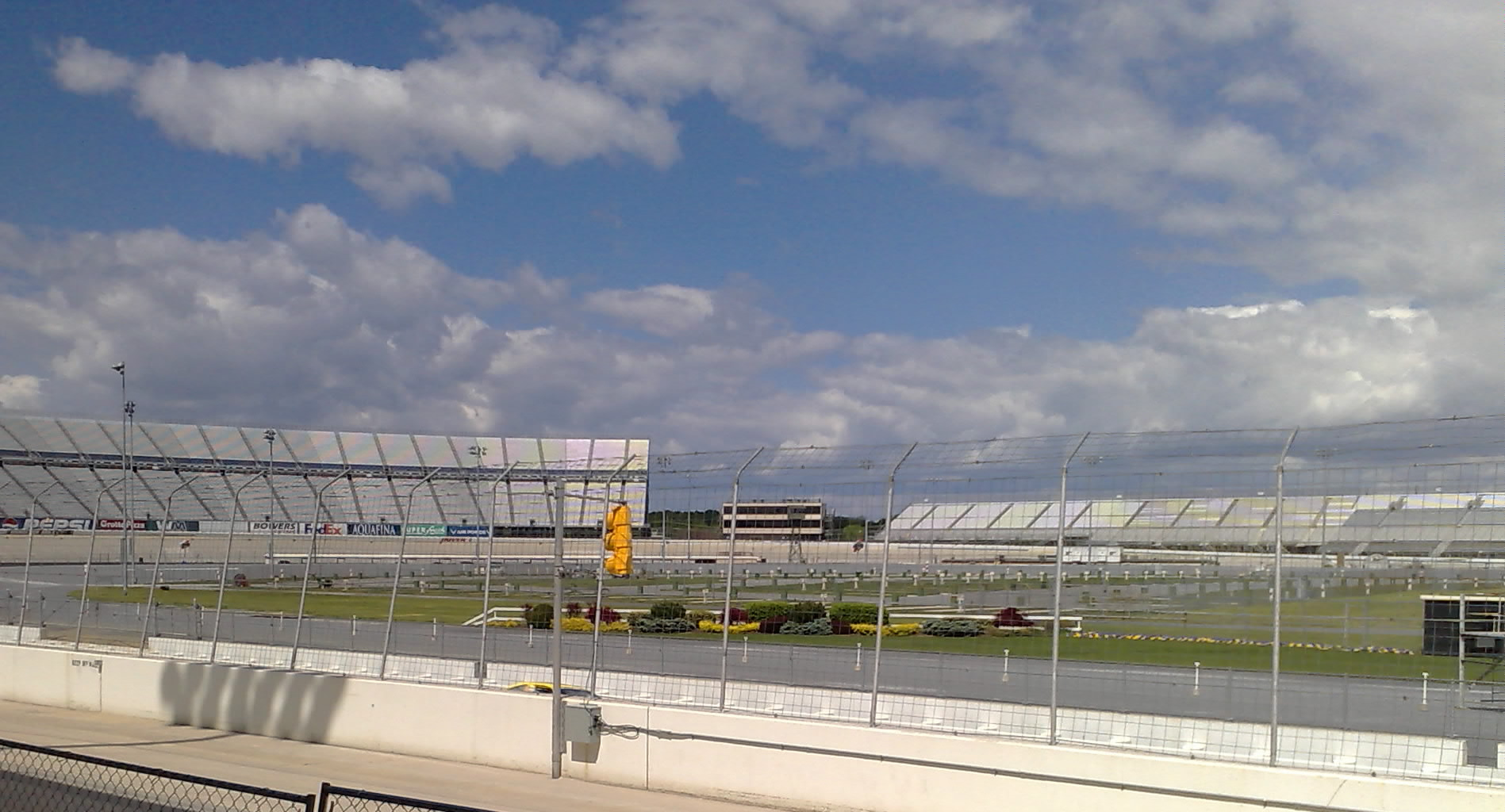
Dover International Speedway, where the race was held.

The 2006 Dover 400 was the twenty-eighth of thirty-six scheduled stock car races of the 2006 NASCAR Nextel Cup Series and the second in the ten-race season-ending Chase for the Nextel Cup. It took place on September 24, 2006, in Dover, Delaware, at Dover International Speedway, a short track which holds NASCAR races. The NASCAR event makes use of the track's standard configuration, a four-turn short track oval that is 1 mile (1.6 km) long. The track's turns are banked at twenty-four degrees; both the front stretch (the location of the finish line) and the backstretch are banked at nine degrees.

Before the race, Kevin Harvick led the Drivers' Championship with 5,230 points, ahead of Denny Hamlin in second and Matt Kenseth third. Jeff Gordon and Jeff Burton were fourth and fifth, and Mark Martin, Dale Earnhardt Jr., Kasey Kahne, Jimmie Johnson and Kyle Busch rounded out the top ten drivers competing for the 2006 Chase for the Nextel Cup. Chevrolet led the Manufacturers' Championship with 204 points; Ford was second on 167 points, followed by Dodge on 162. Johnson was the race's defending champion.

After winning the previous race (at New Hampshire Motor Speedway), Harvick said his team hoped to stay competitive and was looking forward to the remainder of the season: "I am confident, [crew chief] Todd [Berrier] is confident, everybody is confident, but we aren't going to get cocky about it." Gordon stated he was not focussed on winning races, citing the average finishing position of 2005 champion Tony Stewart during that year's final ten races. Kenseth hoped he would secure a top-five finishing position at Dover, where he débuted in 1998, although he did not rule out the possibility of challenging for the victory.

Heading into the event, Roush Racing announced that Craftsman Truck Series driver David Ragan would make his début in the Nextel Cup Series in the team's No. 6 car. Ragan said he was looking forward to competing; "I never thought that the day would come this soon. It just goes to show that hard work and determination really can pay off. I have gotten a lot of racing experience in the Craftsman Truck Series that will help race with the guys in the Nextel Cup Series." Team owner Jack Roush stated the race would allow his team to evaluate Ragan's performance in view of a possible full-time race seat in 2007.

== Practice and qualifying ==
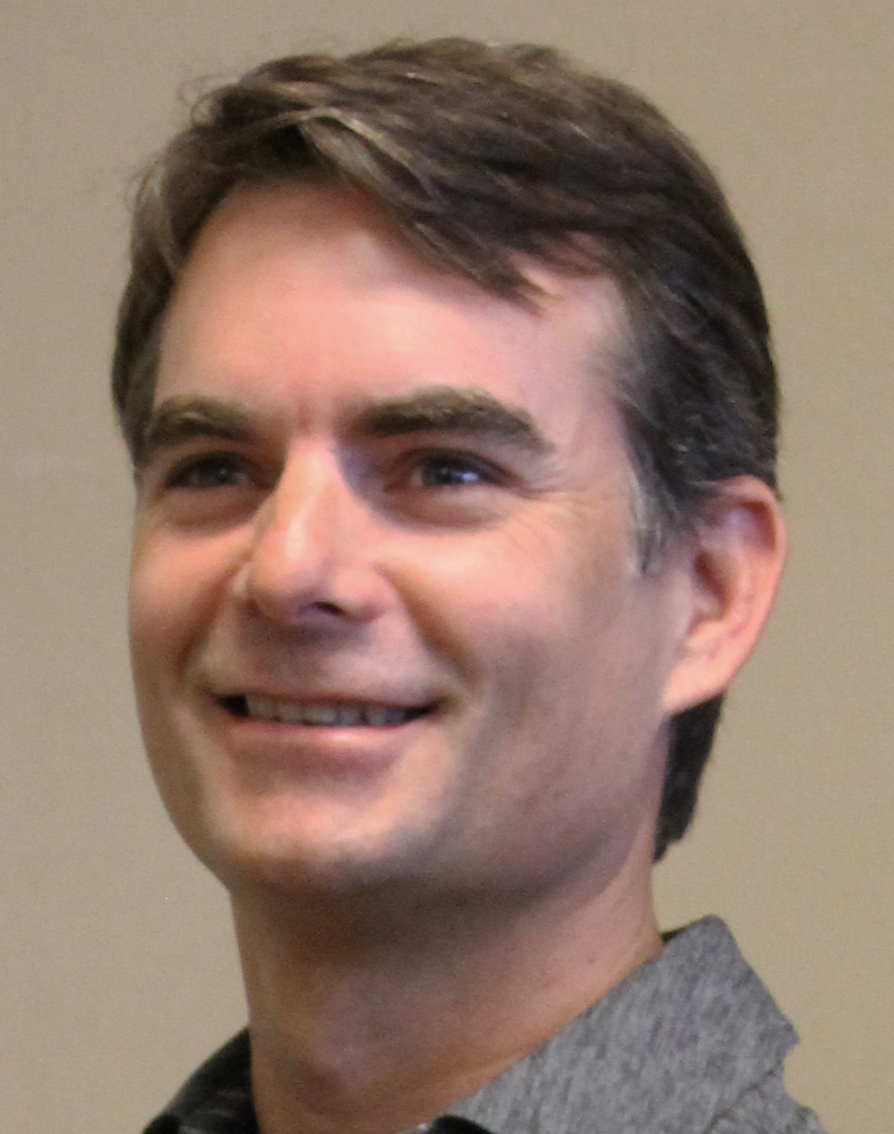
Jeff Gordon (pictured in 2015) had the 55th pole position of his career.

Three practice session were held before the Sunday race: one on Friday and two on Saturday. The first session lasted 85 minutes, the second 60 minutes and the third 45 minutes. In the first practice session, Kahne was fastest with a time of 22.936 seconds; Greg Biffle was second and Gordon third. Edwards took fourth, and Scott Riggs placed fifth. Ryan Newman, J. J. Yeley, Joe Nemechek, Robby Gordon and Kurt Busch rounded out the session's top ten drivers. Tony Raines, Casey Mears and David Gilliland switched to back-up cars after they crashed.

Forty-seven cars were entered in the qualifier on Friday afternoon; according to NASCAR's qualifying procedure forty-three were allowed to race. Each driver ran two laps, with the starting order determined by their fastest lap times. Gordon clinched the 55th pole position of his career, and his first since the 2005 Dodge/Save Mart 350, with a time of 23.053 seconds which was recorded near the session's conclusion. He was joined on the grid's front row by Riggs and had the pole position until Gordon's lap. Riggs missed a gear shift on his lap which meant he overrevved his engine, and was required to change his car's power plant. Kenseth qualified third, Newman fourth and Nemechek fifth. Edwards, Reed Sorenson, Biffle, Martin and Kurt Busch rounded out the top ten qualifiers. Earnhardt, a Chase for the Nextel Cup driver, qualified thirteenth, and Johnson, another driver in the Chase, started eighteenth. Yeley crashed on his first lap after leaving turn one, and his rear-end contacted the wall; he was checked at the infield care center, and later released to continue racing. The four drivers who failed to qualify were Morgan Shepherd, Kenny Wallace, Chad Blount and Donnie Neuenberger. After the qualifier Gordon said: "It feels like my first pole ever. When it goes by for a while, you feel like you lost that magic touch or that combination that it took to get on poles. (It's) really the best car we have out there right now for this type of race track."

On Saturday morning Ryan Newman was fastest in the second practice session with a time of 23.655 seconds, ahead of Kahne and Stewart. Riggs was fourth-fastest; Clint Bowyer was fifth and Kenseth sixth. Kurt Busch, Biffle, Brian Vickers and Kyle Busch followed in the top ten. Of the other drivers in the Chase, Hamlin was twelfth-fastest and Harvick set the fourteenth-fastest time. Later that day, Earnhardt paced the final practice session (which was delayed by five minutes after paper notes left on Burton's car blew off and were scattered across turn one) with a lap of 23.798; Riggs was second and Edwards third. Sorenson was fourth-fastest, ahead of Kahne and Bowyer. Martin was seventh-fastest, Harvick eighth-, Kurt Busch ninth- and Johnson tenth-fastest. Other Chase drivers included Kyle Busch in thirteenth and Kenseth in fifteenth.

=== Qualifying results ===
| Grid | Car | Driver | Team | Manufacturer | Time | Speed |
|---|---|---|---|---|---|---|
| 1 | 24 | Jeff Gordon | Hendrick Motorsports | Chevrolet | 23.053 | 156.162 |
| 2 | 10 | Scott Riggs | Evernham Motorsports | Dodge | 23.068 | 156.060^{1} |
| 3 | 17 | Matt Kenseth | Roush Racing | Ford | 23.079 | 155.986 |
| 4 | 12 | Ryan Newman | Penske Racing South | Dodge | 23.096 | 155.871 |
| 5 | 01 | Joe Nemechek | Ginn Racing | Chevrolet | 23.158 | 155.454 |
| 6 | 99 | Carl Edwards | Roush Racing | Ford | 23.171 | 155.367 |
| 7 | 41 | Reed Sorenson | Chip Ganassi Racing | Dodge | 23.174 | 155.346 |
| 8 | 16 | Greg Biffle | Roush Racing | Ford | 23.188 | 155.253 |
| 9 | 6 | Mark Martin | Roush Racing | Ford | 23.212 | 155.092 |
| 10 | 2 | Kurt Busch | Penske Racing South | Dodge | 23.222 | 155.025 |
| 11 | 49 | Kevin Lepage | BAM Racing | Dodge | 23.235 | 154.939 |
| 12 | 14 | Sterling Marlin | MB2 Motorsports | Chevrolet | 23.266 | 154.732 |
| 13 | 8 | Dale Earnhardt Jr. | Dale Earnhardt, Inc. | Chevrolet | 23..279 | 154.646 |
| 14 | 7 | Robby Gordon | Robby Gordon Motorsports | Chevrolet | 23.296 | 154.533 |
| 15 | 25 | Brian Vickers | Hendrick Motorsports | Chevrolet | 23.302 | 154.493 |
| 16 | 7 | Clint Bowyer | Richard Childress Racing | Chevrolet | 23.314 | 154.414 |
| 17 | 45 | Kyle Petty | Petty Enterprises | Dodge | 23.327 | 154.328 |
| 18 | 48 | Jimmie Johnson | Hendrick Motorsports | Chevrolet | 23.329 | 154.314 |
| 19 | 31 | Jeff Burton | Richard Childress Racing | Chevrolet | 23.331 | 154.301 |
| 20 | 40 | David Stremme | Chip Ganassi Racing | Dodge | 23.334 | 154.281 |
| 21 | 9 | Kasey Kahne | Evernham Motorsports | Dodge | 23.340 | 154.242 |
| 22 | 20 | Tony Stewart | Joe Gibbs Racing | Chevrolet | 23.367 | 154.063 |
| 23 | 11 | Denny Hamlin | Joe Gibbs Racing | Chevrolet | 23.368 | 154.057 |
| 24 | 42 | Casey Mears | Chip Ganassi Racing | Dodge | 23.369 | 154.050 |
| 25 | 29 | Kevin Harvick | Richard Childress Racing | Chevrolet | 23.380 | 153.978 |
| 26 | 43 | Bobby Labonte | Petty Enterprises | Dodge | 23.385 | 153.945 |
| 27 | 5 | Kyle Busch | Hendrick Motorsports | Chevrolet | 23.439 | 153.590 |
| 28 | 66 | Jeff Green | Haas CNC Racing | Chevrolet | 23.453 | 153.499 |
| 29 | 55 | Michael Waltrip | Waltrip-Jasper Racing | Dodge | 23.467 | 153.407 |
| 30 | 32 | Travis Kvapil | PPI Motorsports | Chevrolet | 23.497 | 153.211^{1} |
| 31 | 74 | Derrike Cope | McGlynn Racing | Dodge | 23.515 | 153.094 |
| 32 | 26 | Jamie McMurray | Roush Racing | Ford | 23.524 | 153.035 |
| 33 | 1 | Martin Truex Jr. | Dale Earnhardt, Inc. | Chevrolet | 23.551 | 152.860 |
| 34 | 88 | Dale Jarrett | Robert Yates Racing | Ford | 23.580 | 152.672 |
| 35 | 19 | Elliott Sadler | Evernham Motorsports | Dodge | 23.651 | 152.213 |
| 36 | 21 | Ken Schrader | Wood Brothers Racing | Ford | 23.664 | 152.130 |
| 37 | 6 | David Ragan | Roush Racing | Ford | 23.746 | 151.605 |
| 38 | 22 | Dave Blaney | Bill Davis Racing | Dodge | 23.748 | 151.592 |
| 39 | 38 | David Gilliland | Robert Yates Racing | Ford | 23.756 | 151.541 |
| 40 | 61 | Stanton Barrett | Front Row Motorsports | Dodge | 23.758 | 151.528 |
| 41 | 96 | Tony Raines | Hall of Fame Racing | Chevrolet | 23.936 | 150.401 |
| 42 | 18 | J. J. Yeley | Joe Gibbs Racing | Chevrolet | – | –^{1} |
| 43 | 4 | Scott Wimmer | Morgan–McClure Motorsports | Chevrolet | 23.765 | 151.483 |
Failed to qualify
| 44 | 89 | Morgan Shepherd | Shepherd Racing Ventures | Dodge | 23.843 | 150.988 |
| 45 | 78 | Kenny Wallace | Furniture Row Racing | Chevrolet | 23.872 | 150.804 |
| 46 | 34 | Chad Blount | Front Row Motorsports | Chevrolet | 24.350 | 147.844 |
| 47 | 52 | Donnie Neuenberger | Rick Ware Racing | Dodge | 25.098 | 143.438 |
^{1} Moved to the back of the field for changing engines (#10, #32) and for going to a backup car (#18)

== Race ==
Live television coverage of the race began at 12:30 p.m. Eastern Daylight Time in the United States on TNT. Around the start of the race, weather conditions were partly cloudy with an air temperature of 74 °F (23 °C). Pastor Dan Schafer, of Calvary Assembly of God, began pre-race ceremonies with an invocation. Reality television personality and singer Brooke Hogan performed the national anthem, and wrestler Hulk Hogan commanded the drivers to start their engines. During the pace laps, three drivers moved to the rear of the field because of unapproved changes: Yeley had switched to his back-up car, and Riggs and Travis Kvapil had changed their engines.

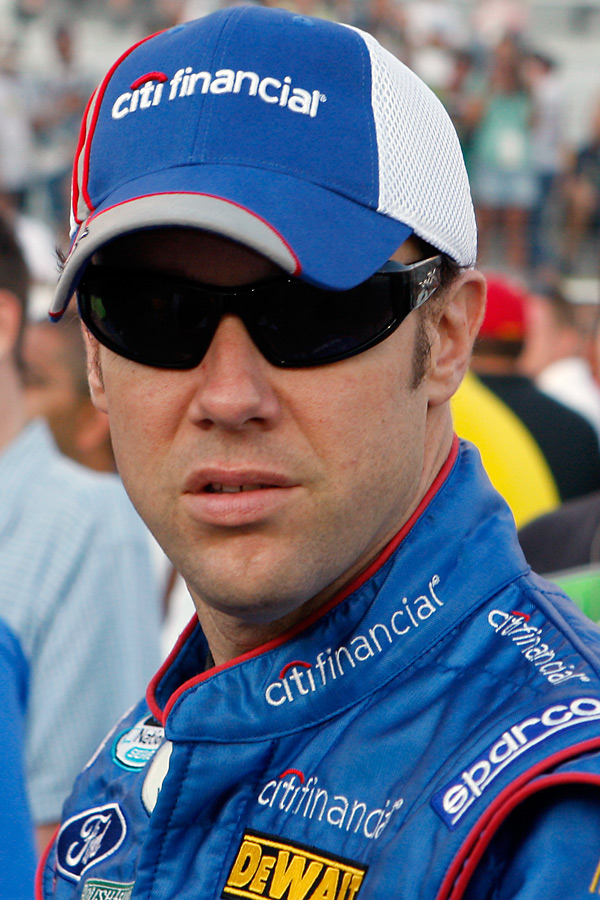
Matt Kenseth (pictured in 2009) led the race for 215 laps, more than any other driver.

The race started at 1:10 p.m. Newman accelerated faster than Gordon off the line and passed him around the outside in the first turn. The first caution was prompted two laps later when Kvapil spun after leaving turn four and hit the inside frontstretch wall, and heavily damaged his car but continued. After starting from 25th, Harvick had moved up to 21st by the first caution. Newman maintained the first position at the lap eight restart. Biffle was passed by Martin for seventh place on the next lap. Stewart lost control of his car and spun in turns three and four; he went up the track and collected Kahne, who was sent into the inside wall, causing the second caution on lap 13. Both Stewart and Kahne had heavy damage to their cars. Newman remained at the leader at the lap-16 restart. Seven laps later, Ken Schrader made contact with the rear-end of Ragan, who was sent spinning at turn four and stopped on the frontstretch, which triggered the third caution. Some of the leaders chose to make pit stops for tires and car adjustments under caution. Johnson was required to move to the end of the longest line, after a crew member allowed one of his tires to roll outside his pit stall.

Newman elected to not make a pit stop, and remained the leader at the lap-27 restart, followed by Edwards. Two laps later, Edwards passed Newman for the lead and began to pull away from the field. Kenseth passed underneath Newman for second on the 33rd lap. Martin had fallen back to 13th by lap 36, and Johnson had moved up to 32nd over the same distance. The fourth caution was necessitated on lap 48 when Ragan went up the track; he made contact with the backstretch wall and spun down the track, heavily damaging the right-front quarter of his car. The leaders, including Edwards, made pit stops for car adjustments. Edwards missed his pit box and had to reverse which caused him to rejoin in 23rd. David Stremme led the field on the lap-53 restart, ahead of Elliott Sadler. Stremme lost the lead on the same lap when Sadler got ahead of him. Kenseth passed Newman for second place on lap 63. Eleven laps later, Kenseth took the lead from Sadler when he passed underneath him. Kurt Busch was passed by Kyle Busch for third place on lap 95, while Earnhardt got ahead of Newman for fifth one lap later.

Robby Gordon's tire went down and made heavy contact with the turn three wall, which necessitated the fifth caution. During the caution, the leaders elected to make pit stops. Kenseth remained at the leader at the lap-105 restart; he was followed by Sadler and Kyle Busch. On lap 106, Kyle Busch (who was attempting to move in front of Sadler) reported that his engine was failing, and fell down to 25th by the 110th lap. He entered pit road two laps later, and was taken to the garage to retire. Sadler passed Kenseth to reclaim the lead on lap 113, but Kenseth regained the position nine laps later. Sadler fell down to third on lap 130 after he was passed by Kurt Busch and Sorenson. Biffle moved in front of Earnhardt for fourth position on the 141st lap, while Sorenson moved ahead of Kurt Busch for second six laps later. The sixth caution was triggered on lap 165 when debris from Jamie McMurray's car was located in turns three and four. The leaders, including Kenseth, chose to make pit stops during the caution. Kenseth parked on his pit box line which required his team to push him into the position and fell down to 20th. Sorenson gained the first place and maintained it at the lap-169 restart.

Kenseth moved into 15th place by the 176th lap. The seventh caution came out on lap 185 when Kevin Lepage lost control of his car in turn two, and went backwards into the outside wall, heavily damaging his deck lid. Some drivers made pit stops for tires during the caution. Sorenson maintained his lead at the lap 190-restart. Stanton Barrett hit the turn four wall near the start-finish line after he lost control of his car on lap 206, which caused the eighth caution to be displayed, and the leaders (including Sorenson) made pit stops. Biffle chose to stay out and led the field at the lap 214-restart, ahead of Sadler and Johnson. Biffle pulled away from the field, while Kenseth moved back into ninth on lap 224. Johnson moved ahead of Sadler for second eleven laps later, while Earnhardt was passed for Kenseth on the same lap. Kenseth moved ahead of teammate McMurray for fifth on the 237th lap, and Earnhardt had moved down to ninth by lap 240. Sadler fell to fifth when he was passed by Martin and Kenseth on lap 242. Kenseth passed teammate Martin to move into third place seven laps later.

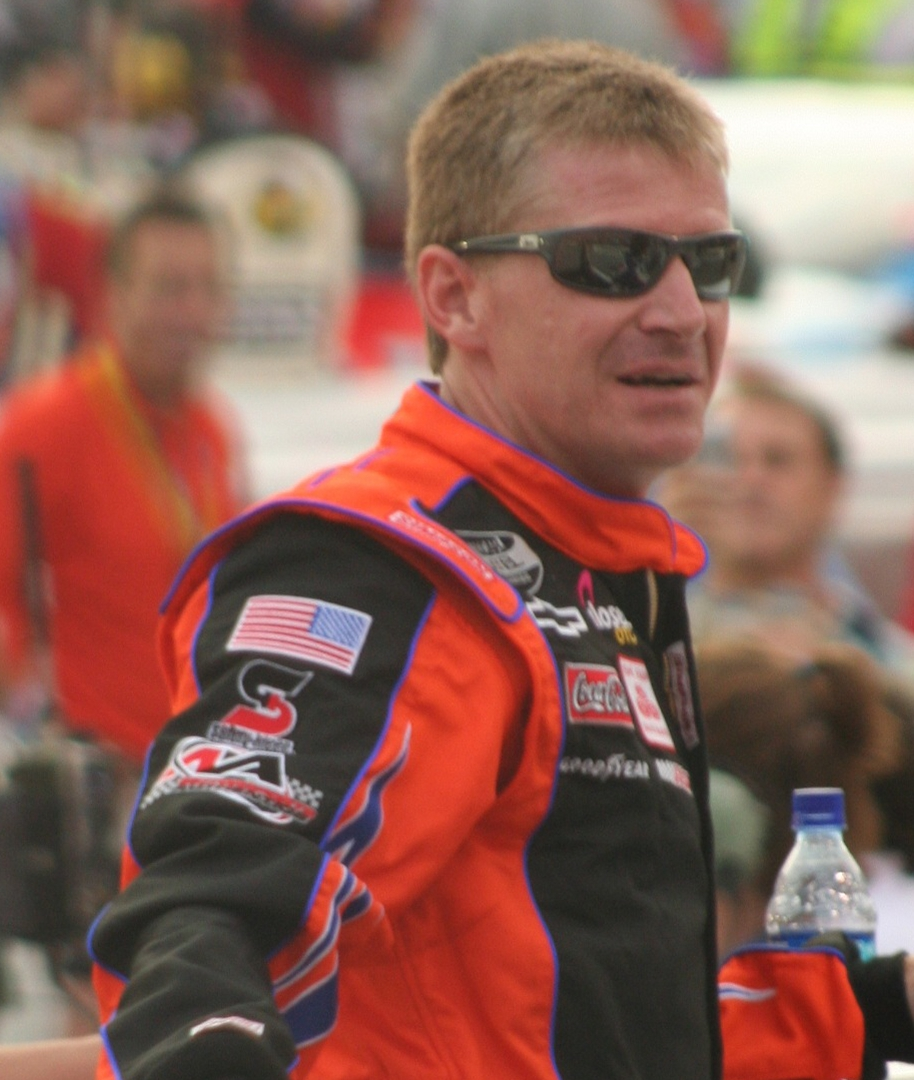
Jeff Burton (pictured in 2007) won the race after passing Kenseth, and ended a 175-race winless streak.

Martin lost fourth position when he was passed by Kurt Busch on lap 251. Kenseth moved ahead of Johnson to claim second place eleven laps later. Green-flag pit stops began on lap 264 when Biffle stopped for four tires and fuel, and Kenseth took over the lead. A flat right-front tire slowed Earnhardt on lap 282; he made a pit stop on the same lap. Sadler and Martin made their pit stops for four tires on laps 285 and 286, and Johnson made a pit stop three laps later. On lap 298, Riggs' right-front tire failed and hit the turn three wall, prompting the ninth caution which allowed officials to clear the track of debris. Riggs had a small fire at his front-end. During the caution, the top-ten leaders made pit stops for tires and fuel. Kenseth remained the leader at the lap-306 restart. The tenth (and final) caution was required on lap 324 when Yeley lost control of his car leaving turn four; he spun on the backstretch and his rear-end made light contact with the wall. Some of the leaders made pit stops under caution. Kenseth remained the leader at the lap-328 restart, followed by Kurt Busch, Sorenson, Burton and Jeff Gordon.

Earnhardt reported a second flat tire and dropped to 26th after reducing his speed. Burton passed Sorenson for third place on lap 340 after a five-lap battle, and Bowyer took sixth from Gordon on the same lap. Harvick was afflicted with an engine problem and switched ignition systems. Gordon lost sixth position when he was passed by Kurt Busch on the 355th lap, while Burton had closed the gap to Kenseth to one second. On lap 371, Gordon got ahead of Bowyer to move back into sixth, while Harvick drove to his garage with smoke billowing from his engine on the same lap and retired. Burton had closed up to Kenseth by lap 375, and attempted to overtake Kenseth over the following ten laps but was unable to get ahead. Kenseth went up the track on the 390th lap, and fended off Burton's attempt to pass him. The battle concluded on lap 395 when Burton moved in front of Kenseth for the lead on the backstretch. Burton started to slowly open a gap between himself and Kenseth. On the final lap, Kenseth and Sorenson ran out of fuel, and Burton maintained the lead to win the race, which ended a 175-race winless streak. Edwards finished second, ahead of Jeff Gordon in third, Kurt Busch in fourth and Biffle fifth. Martin Truex Jr., Bobby Labonte, Bowyer, Hamlin and Kenseth rounded out the top ten finishers. The race had a total of ten cautions and twelve lead changes by nine different drivers.

=== Post-race comments ===
Burton appeared in victory lane to celebrate his first win of the season in front of the crowd; earning him $230,370. He was happy with the result: "That was a heck of a race. It was so much fun racing Matt. I am so appreciative for everyone on this car who stuck with us through times that were tough.", and, "It has been a long time. felt like if we just kept putting ourselves in position then we'd have a good chance. We've been doing that this year." Second-place finisher Edwards congratulated Burton on his victory and said the race was "fun": "We had an awesome Ford Fusion. That's the best car I've ever had here and that was a lot more fun than in the past."

Kahne admitted that his chances of winning the championship were over after his lap 13 crash: "We all thought we had a shot to win the Nextel Cup, but you can't have two rough weeks I don't think. We'd have to win the final eight races to win the Cup." However, Kahne hoped that he would win more races before the season ended. Stewart was upset for damaging Kahne's car: "Wrecking is one thing, but when you take out somebody that's in the Chase, you've screwed up a whole team's year by one race."

The result left Burton leading the Drivers' Championship with 5,351 points, ahead of Jeff Gordon on 5,345. Kenseth and Hamlin were tied for fourth place with 5,335 points each, and both were 36 points ahead of Harvick who fell to fifth. Martin, Earnhardt, Johnson, Kahne and Kyle Busch rounded out the top ten. In the Manufacturers' Championship, Chevrolet maintained the lead with 213 points. Ford remained in second with 171, three points ahead of Dodge. The race took three hours, thirty-four minutes and twenty-one seconds to complete, and the margin of victory was 7.955 seconds.

=== Race results ===
| Pos | Car | Driver | Team | Manufacturer | Laps run | Points |
|---|---|---|---|---|---|---|
| 1 | 31 | Jeff Burton | Richard Childress Racing | Chevrolet | 400 | 185^{1} |
| 2 | 99 | Carl Edwards | Roush Racing | Ford | 400 | 175^{1} |
| 3 | 24 | Jeff Gordon | Hendrick Motorsports | Chevrolet | 400 | 165 |
| 4 | 2 | Kurt Busch | Penske Racing South | Dodge | 400 | 160 |
| 5 | 16 | Greg Biffle | Roush Racing | Ford | 400 | 160^{1} |
| 6 | 1 | Martin Truex Jr. | Dale Earnhardt, Inc. | Chevrolet | 400 | 150 |
| 7 | 43 | Bobby Labonte | Petty Enterprises | Dodge | 400 | 146 |
| 8 | 07 | Clint Bowyer | Richard Childress Racing | Chevrolet | 400 | 142 |
| 9 | 11 | Denny Hamlin | Joe Gibbs Racing | Chevrolet | 400 | 138 |
| 10 | 17 | Matt Kenseth | Roush Racing | Ford | 399 | 144^{2} |
| 11 | 41 | Reed Sorenson | Chip Ganassi Racing | Dodge | 399 | 135^{1} |
| 12 | 22 | Dave Blaney | Bill Davis Racing | Dodge | 399 | 127 |
| 13 | 48 | Jimmie Johnson | Hendrick Motorsports | Chevrolet | 399 | 124 |
| 14 | 6 | Mark Martin | Roush Racing | Ford | 399 | 121 |
| 15 | 88 | Dale Jarrett | Robert Yates Racing | Ford | 398 | 118 |
| 16 | 19 | Elliott Sadler | Evernham Motorsports | Dodge | 398 | 120^{1} |
| 17 | 26 | Jamie McMurray | Roush Racing | Ford | 398 | 112 |
| 18 | 40 | David Stremme | Chip Ganassi Racing | Dodge | 398 | 114^{1} |
| 19 | 21 | Ken Schrader | Wood Brothers Racing | Ford | 397 | 106 |
| 20 | 66 | Jeff Green | Haas CNC Racing | Chevrolet | 397 | 103 |
| 21 | 8 | Dale Earnhardt Jr. | Dale Earnhardt, Inc. | Chevrolet | 397 | 100 |
| 22 | 42 | Casey Mears | Chip Ganassi Racing | Dodge | 397 | 97 |
| 23 | 96 | Tony Raines | Hall of Fame Racing | Chevrolet | 397 | 94 |
| 24 | 12 | Ryan Newman | Penske Racing South | Dodge | 397 | 96^{1} |
| 25 | 45 | Kyle Petty | Petty Enterprises | Dodge | 396 | 88 |
| 26 | 01 | Joe Nemechek | Ginn Racing | Chevrolet | 396 | 85 |
| 27 | 38 | David Gilliland | Robert Yates Racing | Ford | 396 | 82 |
| 28 | 55 | Michael Waltrip | Waltrip-Jasper Racing | Dodge | 396 | 79 |
| 29 | 25 | Brian Vickers | Hendrick Motorsports | Chevrolet | 395 | 76 |
| 30 | 18 | J. J. Yeley | Joe Gibbs Racing | Chevrolet | 395 | 73 |
| 31 | 14 | Sterling Marlin | MB2 Motorsports | Chevrolet | 393 | 75^{1} |
| 32 | 29 | Kevin Harvick | Richard Childress Racing | Chevrolet | 366 | 67 |
| 33 | 20 | Tony Stewart | Joe Gibbs Racing | Chevrolet | 303 | 64 |
| 34 | 10 | Scott Riggs | Evernham Motorsports | Dodge | 295 | 61 |
| 35 | 61 | Stanton Barrett | Front Row Motorsports | Dodge | 202 | 58 |
| 36 | 4 | Scott Wimmer | Morgan-McClure Motorsports | Chevrolet | 199 | 55 |
| 37 | 49 | Kevin Lepage | BAM Racing | Dodge | 182 | 52 |
| 38 | 9 | Kasey Kahne | Evernham Motorsports | Dodge | 172 | 49 |
| 39 | 32 | Travis Kvapil | PPI Motorsports | Chevrolet | 118 | 46 |
| 40 | 5 | Kyle Busch | Hendrick Motorsports | Chevrolet | 100 | 43 |
| 41 | 7 | Robby Gordon | Robby Gordon Motorsports | Chevrolet | 98 | 40 |
| 42 | 06 | David Ragan | Roush Racing | Ford | 46 | 0 |
| 43 | 74 | Derrike Cope | McGlynn Racing | Dodge | 39 | 34 |
^{1} Includes five bonus points for leading a lap^{2} Includes ten bonus points for leading the most laps

== Standings after the race ==
Drivers' Championship standings
| Pos | +/– | Driver | Points |
|---|---|---|---|
| 1 | 4 | Jeff Burton | 5,351 |
| 2 | 2 | Jeff Gordon | 5,345 (−6) |
| 3 | | Matt Kenseth | 5,333 (−18) |
| 4 | 2 | Denny Hamlin | 5,333 (−18) |
| 5 | 2 | Kevin Harvick | 5,297 (−54) |
| 6 | | Mark Martin | 5,276 (−75) |
| 7 | | Dale Earnhardt Jr. | 5,249 (−102) |
| 8 | 1 | Jimmie Johnson | 5,215 (−136) |
| 9 | 1 | Kasey Kahne | 5,169 (−182) |
| 10 | | Kyle Busch | 5,127 (−224) |

Manufacturers' Championship standings
| Pos | +/– | Manufacturer | Points |
|---|---|---|---|
| 1 | | Chevrolet | 213 |
| 2 | | Ford | 171 (−42) |
| 3 | | Dodge | 168 (−45) |

- Note: Only the top ten positions are included for the driver standings. These drivers qualified for the Chase for the Nextel Cup.

| Previous race: 2006 Sylvania 300 | Nextel Cup Series; 2006 season | Next race: 2006 Banquet 400 |
