= Ryan Hackett =

American stock car racing driver

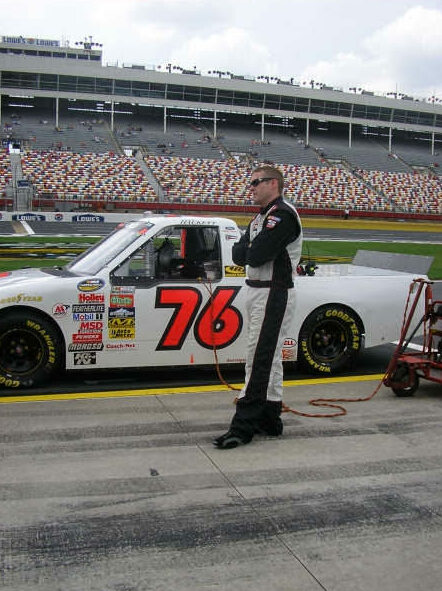
- Hackett in 2009
- Born: July 30, 1982 (age 44); La Plata, Maryland, U.S.

NASCAR O'Reilly Auto Parts Series career
- 1 race run over 1 year
- Best finish: 133rd (2008)
- First race: 2008 Lipton Tea 250 (Richmond)
Wins	Top tens	Poles
0	0	0

NASCAR FedEx Freight Truck Series career
- 12 races run over 5 years
- 2012 position: 62nd
- Best finish: 41st (2009)
- First race: 2008 Ford 200 (Homestead)
- Last race: 2012 Fred's 250 (Talladega)
Wins	Top tens	Poles
0	0	0
- Statistics up to date as of November 17, 2012.

Ryan Orion Hackett (born July 30, 1982) is an American stock car racing driver.

== Racing career ==
Hackett started racing go-karts as a child at Stateline Speedway in King George, Virginia and by age 15 had won his first track championship. In 1998 at 16, he started racing dirt late model cars at Virginia Motor Speedway and Potomac Speedway. In most races, he was the youngest competitor in the field, racing against 30- to 40-year-old men. He won his first dirt late model race in 1999 at the age of 17.

=== ARCA Re/Max Series ===
Hackett continued to race NASCAR late models and, in 2005, he competed in his first race in the ARCA RE/MAX Series, racing in the Hantz Group 200 at Michigan International Speedway. Hackett would start the race in 29th position and finish 12th, earning the race's "Hard Charger Award." He would race in another five ARCA events in the next three years, finishing 12th in the 2006 Pocono 200 at Pocono Raceway, 16th in the 2006 Hantz Group 200 at Michigan, and 14th at the 2008 Kentuckiana Ford Dealers 200 at Salem Speedway.

=== NASCAR ===
==== 2008 season ====
In 2008 Hackett raced in his first NASCAR Nationwide Series race, the Lipton Tea 250, at Richmond International Raceway. He would start 43rd and finish the race 35th. Later in the season, he ran his first Craftsman Truck Series race, the Ford 200 at Homestead-Miami Speedway. He qualified 26th, but his day was cut short due to engine troubles and he finished 34th.

==== 2009 season ====
For his father's team, Hackett would race in seven Camping World Truck Series while also attempting two NASCAR Nationwide Series events. Hackett scored his first top twenty of his NASCAR career with an 18th-place finish in the North Carolina Education Lottery 200 at Lowe's Motor Speedway in May. The following race at Dover, he scored his best qualifying position of 21st. Hackett would lead the first laps of his NASCAR career in the Michigan 200 at Michigan International Speedway and ran in the top ten before an accident cut his day short. For his efforts, Hackett was awarded the "WIX Lap Leader Award" for the race. Hackett made his superspeedway debut in the Mountain Dew 250 at Talladega. He made an impressive run in practice, finishing with the fourth quickest overall time/speed. However, his race was ended prematurely as he had axle problems end his day after only half of the race was complete.

==== 2010 season ====
In mid January 2010, Hackett announced that his team would attempt the season opening NextEra Energy Resources 250 at the historic Daytona International Speedway. This would mark Hackett's first ever visit to the famed track in any series. Hackett also announced that Sears Sand & Gravel of Gloucester, Virginia would serve as primary sponsor of the truck at Daytona. He would qualify for the race in the 27th spot and finish the race with a career best 15th-place result. Hackett would race in the following weeks E-Z-GO 200 at Atlanta Motor Speedway where he would start the race 27th and finish in 30th after a broken crossmember.

==== 2011 season ====
Hackett would attempt just one race in the 2011 Camping World Truck Series season in the Coca-Cola 250 at Talladega. Hackett would start the race in 30th position and would finish on the lead lap in 22nd place.

==== 2012 season ====
In 2012, Hackett would once again make his only Truck Series appearance of the season at Talladega in the Fred's 250. He would once again start in 30th position and finish again on the lead lap, however this time improving his finish position to 17th. Hackett would also run a near full schedule at Potomac Speedway finishing fourth in points in the Super Late Model Division and second in points, with two wins in the Late Model Division despite only running a partial schedule.

== Motorsports career results ==
=== NASCAR ===
(key) (Bold – Pole position awarded by qualifying time. Italics – Pole position earned by points standings or practice time. * – Most laps led.)

==== Nationwide Series ====
NASCAR Nationwide Series results
Year	Team	No.	Make	1	2	3	4	5	6	7	8	9	10	11	12	13	14	15	16	17	18	19	20	21	22	23	24	25	26	27	28	29	30	31	32	33	34	35	NNSC	Pts	Ref
2008	Ray Hackett Racing	76	Ford	DAY	CAL	LVS	ATL	BRI	NSH	TEX	PHO	MXC	TAL	RCH; 35	DAR	CLT	DOV	NSH; DNQ	KEN	MLW	NHA	DAY	CHI	GTY	IRP	CGV	GLN	MCH	BRI; DNQ	CAL	RCH	DOV	KAN	CLT	MEM	TEX	PHO	HOM	133rd	58	
2009	Ray Hackett Racing	76	Ford	DAY	CAL	LVS	BRI	TEX	NSH; DNQ	PHO	TAL	RCH	DAR	CLT	DOV	NSH	KEN	MLW	NHA	DAY	CHI	GTY	IRP	IOW	GLN	MCH	BRI	CGV	ATL	RCH	DOV	KAN	CAL	CLT	MEM	TEX	PHO	HOM	NA	-	
2010	Ray Hackett Racing	76	Ford	DAY	CAL	LVS	BRI	NSH	PHO	TEX	TAL	RCH	DAR	DOV	CLT	NSH	KEN	ROA	NHA	DAY	CHI	GTY	IRP	IOW	GLN	MCH	BRI; DNQ	CGV	ATL	RCH	DOV	KAN	CAL	CLT	GTY	TEX	PHO	HOM	NA	-	

==== Camping World Truck Series ====
NASCAR Camping World Truck Series results
Year	Team	No.	Make	1	2	3	4	5	6	7	8	9	10	11	12	13	14	15	16	17	18	19	20	21	22	23	24	25	NCWTC	Pts	Ref
2008	Ray Hackett Racing	76	Ford	DAY	CAL	ATL	MAR	KAN	CLT	MFD	DOV	TEX	MCH	MLW	MEM	KEN	IRP	NSH	BRI	GTW	NHA	LVS	TAL	MAR	ATL	TEX	PHO	HOM; 31	111th	61	
2009	Ray Hackett Racing	76	Ford	DAY	CAL	ATL	MAR	KAN; 28	CLT; 18	DOV; 29	TEX; 27	MCH; 22	MLW	MEM	KEN; 33	IRP	NSH	BRI	CHI; DNQ	IOW	GTW	NHA	LVS	MAR	TAL; 31	TEX	PHO	HOM	41st	398	
2010	Ray Hackett Racing	76	Ford	DAY; 15	ATL; 30	MAR	NSH	KAN	DOV	CLT	TEX	MCH	IOW	GTY; DNQ	IRP	POC	NSH	DAR	BRI	CHI	KEN	NHA	LVS	MAR	TAL	TEX	PHO	HOM	76th	191	
2011	Ray Hackett Racing	76	Ford	DAY	PHO	DAR	MAR	NSH	DOV	CLT	KAN	TEX	KEN	IOW	NSH	IRP	POC	MCH	BRI	ATL	CHI	NHA	KEN	LVS	TAL; 22	MAR	TEX	HOM	65th	22	
2012	Ray Hackett Racing	76	Ford	DAY	MAR	CAR	KAN	CLT	DOV	TEX	KEN	IOW	CHI	POC	MCH	BRI	ATL	IOW	KEN	LVS	TAL; 17	MAR	TEX	PHO	HOM				62nd	27	

=== ARCA Re/Max Series ===
(key) (Bold – Pole position awarded by qualifying time. Italics – Pole position earned by points standings or practice time. * – Most laps led.)

ARCA Re/Max Series results
Year	Team	No.	Make	1	2	3	4	5	6	7	8	9	10	11	12	13	14	15	16	17	18	19	20	21	22	23	ARSC	Pts	Ref
2005	Ray Hackett Racing	6	Ford	DAY	NSH	SLM	KEN	TOL	LAN	MIL	POC	MCH	KAN	KEN	BLN	POC	GTW	LER	NSH	MCH; 12	ISF	TOL	DSF	CHI	SLM	TAL	116th	170	
2006	Ray Hackett Racing	33	Ford	DAY	NSH	SLM	WIN	KEN	TOL	POC; 12	MCH	KAN	KEN	BLN				MCH; 16	ISF	MIL	TOL	DSF	CHI; DNQ	SLM	TAL	IOW	77th	400	
2006	Ray Hackett Racing	12	Ford												POC; 35	GTW	NSH										77th	400	
2007	Ray Hackett Racing	33	Ford	DAY	USA	NSH	SLM	KAN	WIN	KEN	TOL	IOW	POC; DNQ	MCH	BLN	KEN; DNQ	POC										141st	120	
2007	Ray Hackett Racing	83	Ford															NSH; 32	ISF	MIL	GTW	DSF	CHI	SLM	TAL	TOL	141st	120	
2008	Ray Hackett Racing	39	Ford	DAY	SLM; 14	IOW	KAN	CAR	KEN	TOL	POC	MCH	CAY	KEN	BLN	POC	NSH	ISF	DSF	CHI	SLM	NJE	TAL	TOL			109th	160	
