= Donnie Neuenberger =

American racing driver (born 1962)

- Born: August 10, 1962 (age 64); Brandywine, Maryland, U.S.

NASCAR O'Reilly Auto Parts Series career
- 40 races run over 11 years
- 2013 position: 64th
- Best finish: 48th (2011)
- First race: 2002 Little Trees 300 (Charlotte)
- Last race: 2013 5-hour Energy 200 (Dover)
Wins	Top tens	Poles
0	0	0

NASCAR FedEx Freight Truck Series career
- 25 races run over 9 years
- 2015 position: 61st
- Best finish: 46th (2010)
- First race: 2000 Daytona 250 (Daytona)
- Last race: 2015 WinStar World Casino & Resort 400 (Texas)
Wins	Top tens	Poles
0	2	0
- Statistics up to date as of May 5, 2015.

Donnie Neuenberger (born August 10, 1962) is an American former professional stock car racing driver.

== Racing career ==
=== NASCAR ===
==== Nationwide Series ====
Neuenberger made his Busch Series debut at Lowe's Motor Speedway in fall 2002. With his alma mater, the University of Maryland, College Park on the No. 77 Moy Racing Ford, he started in 41st and finished 26th.

Neuenberger was then able to run more races in 2003, as most of his NASCAR Craftsman Truck Series schedule emptied out. Driving Moy Racing and Means Racing (No. 52), he improved on his debut with a twentieth place finish in the season opener at Daytona. He was 21st at Talladega, 42nd at Dover, and thirtieth at Daytona in the July race for Moy. In two races for Means Racing, he finished 41st at Texas and 36th at Dover.

Neuenberger planned to compete in a full season run in 2004. With sponsorship from BG Products, Neuenberger made and ran the first five races of 2004. However, it did not go very well, as his best finish in that span was 33rd at Rockingham, hat race being the only one he finished. After not qualifying for two races with the team, Neuenberger made his final race of the season at Talladega, where he matched his best finish of the year, 33rd and had his best start, thirtieth.

After Talladega, Neuenberger was diagnosed with cancer, and did not race for the rest of the year.

Neuenberger was able to return to the track in what many consider a feel-good story. The MacDonald Motorsports No. 72 team invited him back to Daytona to drive the P4OT.com Chevy. Neuenberger jumped at the chance and enjoyed brief media limelight for his jump back to the track. After qualifying 37th, Neuenberger was running mid-pack before engine problems showed and he finished 38th. Means Racing wanted Neuenberger back as well. He would drive both races at Dover for the team, finishing 39th in both. Notably, in the fall, Neuenberger was involved in a thirteen-car pileup on lap two. His No. 52 Plan B Technologies Ford flipped twice before landing on all four wheels, allowing Neuenberger to drive away.

In 2008, with sponsorship from Royal Farms, Neuenberger finished fourteenth at Talladega, his highest finishing position in the series.

In 2009, Neuenberger ran three more races for Means Racing, earning a best finish of 28th.

In 2010, Neuenberger drove part-time in the No. 52 IHOP Chevrolet for Means in one race at Talladega.

Neuenberger has not raced in the series since 2013 at Dover.

==== Camping World Truck Series ====
Neuenberger made his NASCAR debut in the inaugural Craftsman Truck Series race at Daytona in 2000. He started the race in 26th position in the No. 84 eBay Ford. Neuenberger was able to avoid a large wreck and finished in the ninth position. In addition to the season opener, Nueunberger drove in the 2000 season finale. After starting 34th, Neuenberger took the No. 51 Line-X Chevy to a 30th-place position.

Neuenberger's runs in 2000 earned him a part-time ride in 2001. He returned to Daytona, driving the No. 51 Baltimore Ravens Chevy, finishing 15th. That would be his best finish in 2001. He ran five other races with sponsorship from IHOP. He was 28th at Darlington Speedway, 30th at Dover, 19th at Texas, 26th at Richmond and 36th in the fall race at Texas. His best qualifying effort came in the spring race at Texas, where he started 19th.

Neuenberger and IHOP would also return for two races in 2002. He was 25th at Daytona and 29th at Texas, where he had his best qualifying effort of 29th for 2002. He did not finish either race due to crashes.

Neuenberger drove two races in 2003 for Rodney Smith, owner of the No. 66 Dodge. At Charlotte and Texas, Neuenberger finished in the 25th position. His better qualifying effort came at Texas, where he started 23rd.

Neuenberger finished in the fourteenth position at Talladega sponsored by Royal Farms Gas Stations, his highest finishing Nationwide spot ever following a top-25 in Dover last fall with planbtech.net on board. In 2010, he finished ninth in the season opener at Daytona International Speedway in the No. 6 EZ-Slider Chevrolet for Rick Ware Racing. It was his first race in ten years at the track, and he scored the same result as he had in 2000. Neuenberger drove in select races throughout the season and continued to do so with the team through 2012. He would return to the series in 2015, running two races for MAKE Motorsports.

=== Other series ===
Neuenberger attempted the NASCAR Nextel Cup Series races at Dover in 2006 but failed to qualify for both. He made appearances in the now ARCA Menards Series between 1999 and 2014. He has run four races in the now ARCA Menards Series East, all at Dover. His best finish was twentieth in 2006. He also competed in the Goody's Dash Series.

== Motorsports career results ==
=== NASCAR ===
(key) (Bold – Pole position awarded by qualifying time. Italics – Pole position earned by points standings or practice time. * – Most laps led.)

==== Nextel Cup Series ====
NASCAR Nextel Cup Series results
Year	Team	No.	Make	1	2	3	4	5	6	7	8	9	10	11	12	13	14	15	16	17	18	19	20	21	22	23	24	25	26	27	28	29	30	31	32	33	34	35	36	NNCC	Pts	Ref
2006	Rick Ware Racing	52	Dodge	DAY	CAL	LVS	ATL	BRI	MAR	TEX	PHO	TAL	RCH	DAR	CLT	DOV; DNQ	POC	MCH	SON	DAY	CHI	NHA	POC	IND	GLN	MCH	BRI	CAL	RCH	NHA	DOV; DNQ	KAN	TAL	CLT	MAR	ATL	TEX	PHO	HOM	NA	-	

==== Nationwide Series ====
NASCAR Nationwide Series results
Year	Team	No.	Make	1	2	3	4	5	6	7	8	9	10	11	12	13	14	15	16	17	18	19	20	21	22	23	24	25	26	27	28	29	30	31	32	33	34	35	NNSC	Pts	Ref
2002	Jimmy Means Racing	52	Ford	DAY	CAR	LVS	DAR	BRI	TEX	NSH	TAL	CAL	RCH	NHA	NZH	CLT	DOV	NSH	KEN	MLW	DAY	CHI	GTY	PPR	IRP	MCH	BRI	DAR	RCH	DOV; DNQ	KAN								104th	85	
2002	Moy Racing	77	Ford																													CLT; 26	MEM	ATL	CAR	PHO	HOM		104th	85	
2003	Moy Racing	77	Ford	DAY; 20	CAR	LVS	DAR	BRI		TAL; 21	NSH	CAL	RCH	GTY	NZH	CLT	DOV; 42	NSH	KEN	MLW	DAY; 30	CHI	NHA	PPR	IRP	MCH	BRI	DAR	RCH										74th	408	
2003	Jimmy Means Racing	52	Ford						TEX; 41																					DOV; 36	KAN	CLT	MEM	ATL	PHO	CAR	HOM		74th	408	
2004	Moy Racing	77	Ford	DAY; 38	CAR; 33	LVS; 41	DAR; 38	BRI; 43	TEX; DNQ	NSH	TAL; 33	CAL	GTY	RCH	NZH	CLT	DOV	NSH	KEN	MLW	DAY	CHI	NHA	PPR	IRP	MCH	BRI	CAL	RCH	DOV	KAN	CLT	MEM	ATL	PHO	DAR	HOM		75th	300	
2005	MacDonald Motorsports	72	Chevy	DAY; 38	CAL	MXC	LVS	ATL	NSH	BRI	TEX	PHO																											101st	129	
2005	Jimmy Means Racing	52	Ford										TAL; DNQ	DAR	RCH	CLT	DOV; 39	NSH	KEN	MLW	DAY; DNQ	CHI	NHA	PPR	GTY	IRP	GLN	MCH	BRI	CAL	RCH	DOV; 43	KAN	CLT	MEM	TEX	PHO	HOM	101st	129	
2006	Glynn Motorsports	58	Chevy	DAY; 23	CAL; 39	MXC	LVS	ATL	BRI	TEX	NSH	PHO																											96th	180	
2006	MacDonald Motorsports	72	Chevy										TAL; 41	RCH	DAR	CLT	DOV	NSH	KEN	MLW	DAY	CHI	NHA	MAR	GTY	IRP	GLN	MCH	BRI	CAL	RCH								96th	180	
2006	Donnie Neuenberger	52	Ford																													DOV; 34	KAN	CLT	MEM	TEX	PHO	HOM	96th	180	
2007	Jimmy Means Racing	52	Ford	DAY	CAL	MXC	LVS	ATL	BRI	NSH	TEX	PHO	TAL; 38	RCH	DAR	CLT	DOV; 39	NSH	KEN	MLW	NHA	DAY; 41	CHI	GTY	IRP	CGV	GLN	MCH	BRI	CAL	RCH	DOV; 25	KAN	CLT	MEM	TEX	PHO	HOM	99th	228	
2008	Jimmy Means Racing	52	Chevy	DAY; DNQ	CAL	LVS	ATL	BRI	NSH				TAL; 14	RCH	DAR	CLT						DAY; 34	CHI	GTY	IRP	CGV	GLN	MCH; 31	BRI	CAL	RCH					TEX; 38	PHO	HOM	70th	396	
2008	JD Motorsports	0	Chevy							TEX; DNQ	PHO	MXC																											70th	396	
2008	Jimmy Means Racing	52	Ford														DOV; 34	NSH	KEN	MLW	NHA																		70th	396	
2008	Jimmy Means Racing	52	Dodge																													DOV; 43	KAN	CLT	MEM				70th	396	
2009	Jimmy Means Racing	52	Chevy	DAY; 36	CAL	LVS	BRI	TEX	NSH	PHO	TAL; 28	RCH	DAR	CLT	DOV	NSH	KEN	MLW	NHA	DAY; 42	CHI	GTY	IRP	IOW	GLN	MCH	BRI	CGV	ATL	RCH	DOV	KAN	CAL	CLT	MEM	TEX	PHO	HOM	103rd	171	
2010	Jimmy Means Racing	52	Chevy	DAY; Wth	CAL	LVS	BRI	NSH	PHO	TEX	TAL; 38	RCH	DAR	DOV	CLT	NSH	KEN	ROA	NHA	DAY	CHI	GTY	IRP	IOW	GLN	MCH	BRI	CGV	ATL	RCH	DOV; DNQ	KAN	CAL	CLT	GTY	TEX	PHO	HOM	139th	49	
2011	MacDonald Motorsports	81	Dodge	DAY; 23	PHO	LVS; 26	BRI	CAL	TEX	TAL; 20	NSH	RCH	DAR	DOV; 33	IOW	CLT	CHI	MCH	ROA	DAY	KEN	NHA	NSH	IRP	IOW	GLN	CGV	BRI	ATL	RCH	CHI	DOV	KAN	CLT	TEX	PHO	HOM		48th	74	
2012	Ray Hackett Racing	76	Ford	DAY; DNQ	PHO	LVS	BRI	CAL	TEX	RCH	TAL	DAR	IOW	CLT	DOV	MCH	ROA	KEN	DAY	NHA	CHI	IND	IOW	GLN	CGV	BRI	ATL	RCH	CHI	KEN	DOV	CLT	KAN	TEX	PHO	HOM			NA	-	
2013	Jimmy Means Racing	52	Chevy	DAY	PHO	LVS	BRI	CAL	TEX	RCH	TAL; 19	DAR	CLT	DOV	IOW	MCH	ROA	KEN	DAY	NHA	CHI	IND	IOW	GLN	MOH	BRI	ATL	RCH	CHI	KEN									64th	35	
2013	Rick Ware Racing	23	Ford																												DOV; 34	KAN	CLT	TEX	PHO	HOM			64th	35	

==== Camping World Truck Series ====
NASCAR Camping World Truck Series results
Year	Team	No.	Make	1	2	3	4	5	6	7	8	9	10	11	12	13	14	15	16	17	18	19	20	21	22	23	24	25	NCWTC	Pts	Ref
2000	Long Brothers Racing	84	Ford	DAY; 9	HOM	PHO	MMR	MAR	PIR	GTY	MEM	PPR	EVG	TEX	KEN	GLN	MLW	NHA	NZH	MCH	IRP	NSV							60th	291	
2000	DGN Racing	21	Ford																				CIC; DNQ	RCH	DOV; DNQ	TEX			60th	291	
2000	Ware Racing Enterprises	51	Chevy																								CAL; 30		60th	291	
2001	Ware Racing Enterprises	51	Chevy	DAY; 15	HOM	MMR	MAR	GTY	DAR; 28	PPR	DOV; 30	TEX; 19	MEM	MLW	KAN	KEN	NHA	IRP	NSH	CIC	NZH								50th	516	
2001	Ware Racing Enterprises	81	Chevy																			RCH; 26	SBO	TEX; 36	LVS	PHO	CAL		50th	516	
2002	Ware Racing Enterprises	81	Dodge	DAY; 25	DAR	MAR	GTY	PPR		TEX; 29	MEM	MLW	KAN	KEN	NHA	MCH	IRP	NSH	RCH	TEX	SBO	LVS	CAL	PHO	HOM				71st	164	
2002	Team Racing	86	Chevy						DOV; DNQ																				71st	164	
2003	MLB Motorsports	66	Dodge	DAY	DAR	MMR	MAR	CLT; 25	DOV	TEX; 25	MEM	MLW	KAN	KEN	GTW	MCH	IRP	NSH	BRI	RCH	NHA	CAL	LVS	SBO	TEX	MAR	PHO	HOM	86th	176	
2009	GunBroker Racing	21	Dodge	DAY	CAL	ATL	MAR	KAN	CLT; 35	DOV	TEX	MCH	MLW	MEM	KEN	IRP	NSH	BRI	CHI	IOW	GTW	NHA	LVS	MAR	TAL	TEX	PHO	HOM	108th	58	
2010	Rick Ware Racing	6	Chevy	DAY; 9	ATL; 24	MAR	NSH	KAN	DOV; 35	CLT		MCH; 25	IOW	GTY	IRP	POC	NSH	DAR	BRI	CHI	KEN								46th	609	
2010	Rick Ware Racing	16	Chevy								TEX; 33																		46th	609	
2010	Rick Ware Racing	6	Dodge																			NHA; 35	LVS	MAR					46th	609	
2010	Rick Ware Racing	47	Chevy																						TAL; 17	TEX	PHO	HOM	46th	609	
2011	Rick Ware Racing	07	Chevy	DAY; 33	PHO	DAR	MAR	NSH	DOV	CLT	KAN	TEX	KEN	IOW	NSH	IRP	POC	MCH	BRI	ATL	CHI	NHA	KEN	LVS					104th	0^{1}	
2011	Rick Ware Racing	16	Chevy																						TAL; 32	MAR	TEX	HOM	104th	0^{1}	
2012	Rick Ware Racing	1	Chevy	DAY	MAR	CAR	KAN	CLT	DOV	TEX	KEN	IOW	CHI	POC	MCH	BRI	ATL	IOW	KEN	LVS	TAL; 30	MAR	TEX	PHO	HOM				99th	0^{1}	
2015	MAKE Motorsports	1	Chevy	DAY; 31	ATL	MAR	KAN	CLT	DOV																				61st	29	
2015	MAKE Motorsports	50	Chevy							TEX; 28	GTW	IOW	KEN	ELD	POC	MCH	BRI	MSP	CHI	NHA	LVS	TAL	MAR	TEX	PHO	HOM			61st	29	

==== Goody's Dash Series ====
NASCAR Goody's Dash Series results
Year	Team	No.	Make	1	2	3	4	5	6	7	8	9	10	11	12	13	14	15	16	17	18	19	20	21	NGDS	Pts	Ref
1992	DGN Racing	14	Chevy	DAY	HCY	LON	FLO	LAN	SUM; 19	STH	BGS	MYB; 13	NRV; 15	SUM; 13	ACE; 11	HCY	VOL								26th	602	
1993	DGN Racing	14	Chevy	DAY; 13	NSV; 8	SUM; 12	VOL; 16	MAR; 19	LON; 11	411; 16	LAN	HCY	SUM	FLO	BGS	MYB	NRV	HCY; 9	VOL						15th	997	
1994	N/A	43	Chevy	DAY; 29	VOL; 19		SUM; 8	CAR; 13	411; 9	HCY; 18															21st	1125	
1994	N/A	77	Pontiac			FLO; 14					LAN; 13		SUM; 17	FLO	BGS	MYB	NRV	ASH	VOL	HCY					21st	1125	
1994	N/A	77	Chevy									BRI; 30													21st	1125	
1995	N/A	14	Chevy	DAY; 9	FLO	LAN	MYB	SUM	HCY	CAR	STH	BRI	SUM	GRE	BGS	MYB	NSV	FLO	NWS	VOL	HCY	HOM			N/A	0	
1996	N/A	00	Ford	DAY; 19	HOM																				49th	362	
1996	N/A	96	Ford			MYB; 28	SUM																		49th	362	
1996	DGN Racing	14	Chevy					NSV; 10	TRI	CAR	HCY	FLO	BRI	SUM	GRE	SNM	BGS	MYB	LAN	STH	FLO	NWS	VOL	HCY	49th	362	
1997	DGN Racing	14	Pontiac	DAY; 7	HOM	KIN	MYB	LAN	CAR	TRI	FLO	HCY	BRI	GRE	SNM	CLT; 12	MYB	LAN; DNQ	SUM	STA	HCY	USA	CON	HOM	41st	434	
1998	DGN Racing	14	Pontiac	DAY; 12	HCY; 16	CAR; DNQ	CLT; 38	TRI; 22	LAN; 8	BRI; 11	SUM; 20	GRE; 22	ROU; 21		MYB; 15	CON; 9	HCY; 15	LAN; 18	STA; 16	LOU; 18	VOL	USA; 9	HOM; 26		13th	2081	
1998	N/A	7	Pontiac											SNM; 12											13th	2081	
1999	DGN Racing	14	Pontiac	DAY; DNQ	HCY; 9	CAR; 9	CLT; 36	BRI; 29	LOU; 16	SUM; 23	GRE; 19	ROU; 12	STA	MYB; 23	HCY	LAN	USA	JAC	LAN						22nd	940	
2000	DGN Racing	14	Chevy	DAY; DNQ	MON	STA	JAC	CAR	CLT	SBO	ROU	LOU	SUM	GRE	SNM	MYB	BRI	HCY	JAC	USA	LAN				87th	22	

=== ARCA Racing Series ===
(key) (Bold – Pole position awarded by qualifying time. Italics – Pole position earned by points standings or practice time. * – Most laps led.)

ARCA Racing Series results
Year	Team	No.	Make	1	2	3	4	5	6	7	8	9	10	11	12	13	14	15	16	17	18	19	20	21	22	23	ARSC	Pts	Ref
1999		14	Ford	DAY; DNQ	ATL	SLM	AND	CLT	MCH	POC	TOL	SBS	BLN	POC	KIL	FRS	FLM	ISF	WIN	DSF	SLM	CLT	TAL	ATL			NA	-	
2005		67	Ford	DAY	NSH	SLM	KEN	TOL	LAN	MIL	POC	MCH	KAN	KEN	BLN	POC	GTW	LER	NSH	MCH	ISF	TOL	DSF	CHI	SLM	TAL; DNQ	201st	25	
2012	Carter 2 Motorsports	40	Dodge	DAY; DNQ	MOB	SLM																					103rd	165	
2012	Carter 2 Motorsports	97	Chevy				TAL; 18	TOL	ELK	POC	MCH	WIN	NJE	IOW	CHI	IRP	POC	BLN	ISF	MAD	SLM	DSF	KAN				103rd	165	
2013	Donnie Neuenberger	19	Chevy	DAY; 18	MOB	SLM	TAL; 32	TOL	ELK	POC	MCH	ROA	WIN	CHI	NJE	POC	BLN	ISF	MAD	DSF	IOW	SLM	KEN	KAN			98th	210	
2014	Carter 2 Motorsports	40	Dodge	DAY	MOB	SLM	TAL; 30	TOL	NJE	POC	MCH	ELK	WIN	CHI	IRP	POC	BLN	ISF	MAD	DSF	SLM	KEN	KAN				141st	80	
2015	Carter 2 Motorsports	40	Dodge	DAY; QL^{†}	MOB	NSH	SLM	TAL	TOL	NJE	POC	MCH	CHI	WIN	IOW	IRP	POC	BLN	ISF	DSF	SLM	KEN	KAN				NA	-	
^{†} - Qualified for Roger Carter

== Health ==
After his 2004 race at Talladega, Neuenberger was diagnosed with cancer after nerves were pinched by a tumor during a race. He was treated with chemotherapy. Neuenberger did not race for the rest of the year while recovering.
