= D'Hondt Humphrey Motorsports =

Former NASCAR team

D'Hondt Motorsports
- Owner: Eddie D'Hondt
- Base: Denver, North Carolina
- Series: Nationwide Series; ARCA RE/MAX Series
- Race drivers: 90. Danny O'Quinn, Jr.; 91. David Gilliland; 92. Kyle Busch

Career
- Drivers' Championships: 0

D'Hondt Motorsports was a NASCAR Nationwide Series and ARCA RE/MAX Series team owned by current Spire Motorsports spotter Eddie D'Hondt. The team most notably fielded the Nos. 90 and 91 cars in the 2010 NASCAR Nationwide Series season.

Owner Eddie D’Hondt began his career in NASCAR in 1981 driving Street Stocks at Islip Speedway and Riverhead Raceway on Long Island. In 1986, he moved to the NASCAR Whelen Modified Tour, then moving south to Charlotte, North Carolina in 1996 to begin a career in the NASCAR Winston Cup Series. He started his Cup career working for famed owner Harry Ranier. After climbing his way up within the Cup series, managing and owning teams, he now serves as a full-time spotter for the Spire Motorsports No. 7 car driven by Justin Haley.

== NASCAR Nationwide Series ==
D'Hondt entered NASCAR in 2007 as a partner in Riley-D'Hondt Motorsports with Bill and Bob Riley and Jim Matthews as co-owners. They made their debut at Richmond International Raceway in the Busch Series with Bobby Santos III qualifying seventh in the No. 91 Toyota Camry and finishing thirtieth. David Green drove the next three races in the 91 and had a best finish of eleventh before Santos drove the car at Loudon, starting 4th and finishing 33rd. Santos also drove two races in a second car, the No. 92, in two races but did not finish either of them. In addition, Marc Goossens drove in the Sprint Cup Series at Infineon Raceway, where he finished 36th. After the season, Riley left leaving D'Hondt as the sole owner. The team's only start in 2008 came at Watkins Glen International, where Kyle Busch finished second in the No. 92 Zippo Toyota.

In 2010, D'Hondt formed a partnership with Randy Humphrey of Prism Motorsports and fielded two Nationwide Series entries that were owned by MSRP Motorsports, Prism's former nome de pleur. Danny O'Quinn, Jr. drove the No. 90 for 20 races and David Gilliland drove the No. 91 for 16 races, with Chase Miller driving the car for 7 races. Both teams started and parked for the season and did not continue beyond 2010.

=== Car No. 90 results ===
| Year | Driver | No. | Make | 1 | 2 | 3 | 4 | 5 | 6 | 7 | 8 | 9 | 10 | 11 | 12 | 13 | 14 | 15 | 16 | 17 | 18 | 19 | 20 | 21 | 22 | 23 | 24 | 25 | 26 | 27 | 28 | 29 | 30 | 31 | 32 | 33 | 34 | 35 | Owners | Pts |
|---|---|---|---|---|---|---|---|---|---|---|---|---|---|---|---|---|---|---|---|---|---|---|---|---|---|---|---|---|---|---|---|---|---|---|---|---|---|---|---|---|
| 2008 | Steve Grissom | 90 | Chevy | DAY; 43 | | | | | | | | | | | | | | | | | | | | | | | | | | | | | | | | | | | 38th | 1505 |
| 2008 | Scott Lynch | 90 | Chevy | | CAL; 41 | | | | | | | | | | | | | | | | | | | | | | | | | | | | | | | | | | 38th | 1505 |
| 2008 | Todd Bodine | 90 | Chevy | | | LVS; 37 | | | | | | | | | | | | | | | | | | | | | | | | | | | | | | | | | 38th | 1505 |
| 2008 | Johnny Chapman | 90 | Chevy | | | | ATL; 38 | BRI; 38 | NSH; 39 | TEX; 39 | PHO; 38 | | TAL; 39 | RCH; 42 | DAR; 38 | CLT; DNQ | DOV; 39 | NSH; 37 | KEN; 36 | MLW; 39 | NHA; 38 | DAY; 40 | CHI; 37 | GTY; 35 | IRP; 41 | | | MCH; 39 | BRI; DNQ | CAL; 39 | RCH; 43 | DOV; 38 | KAN; DNQ | CLT; 41 | MEM; DNQ | TEX; 39 | | | 38th | 1505 |
| 2008 | Chris Cook | 90 | Chevy | | | | | | | | | MXC; 40 | | | | | | | | | | | | | | | GLN; 43 | | | | | | | | | | | | 38th | 1505 |
| 2008 | Don Thomson Jr. | 90 | Chevy | | | | | | | | | | | | | | | | | | | | | | | CGV; 40 | | | | | | | | | | | | | 38th | 1505 |
| 2008 | Terry Cook | 90 | Chevy | | | | | | | | | | | | | | | | | | | | | | | | | | | | | | | | | | PHO; 40 | HOM; 42 | 38th | 1505 |
| 2009 | Johnny Chapman | 90 | Chevy | DAY; DNQ | CAL; 39 | LVS; 42 | BRI; 41 | TEX; 43 | NSH; 43 | | TAL; DNQ | RCH; 43 | DAR; 42 | CLT; 42 | DOV; 40 | NSH; 38 | KEN; 39 | MLW; 43 | NHA; 43 | DAY; 43 | CHI; DNQ | GTY; 39 | IRP; 41 | IOW; 42 | | MCH; 39 | BRI; 43 | | ATL; 42 | RCH; 42 | DOV; 40 | KAN; 42 | CAL; 42 | CLT; 43 | MEM; DNQ | TEX; 40 | PHO; 40 | HOM; 42 | 43rd | 1319 |
| 2009 | Dave Blaney | 90 | Chevy | | | | | | | PHO; 43 | | | | | | | | | | | | | | | | | | | | | | | | | | | | | 43rd | 1319 |
| 2009 | Mike Bliss | 90 | Chevy | | | | | | | | | | | | | | | | | | | | | | GLN; 43 | | | | | | | | | | | | | | 43rd | 1319 |
| 2009 | Chris Cook | 90 | Chevy | | | | | | | | | | | | | | | | | | | | | | | | | CGV; 41 | | | | | | | | | | | 43rd | 1319 |
| 2010 | Danny O'Quinn Jr. | 90 | Chevy | DAY | CAL; DNQ | LVS; 38 | BRI; 41 | NSH; 43 | PHO; 42 | TEX; 39 | TAL | RCH; DNQ | DAR; 40 | | CLT; 38 | NSH; 38 | KEN; 41 | | NHA; 37 | DAY | CHI; 41 | GTY; 37 | IRP; 38 | IOW; 38 | GLN | MCH | | | ATL; 38 | RCH | DOV; 37 | KAN; 39 | CAL; 35 | CLT | GTY; 42 | TEX; DNQ | PHO; 37 | HOM; DNQ | 39th | 1249 |
| 2010 | Chase Miller | 90 | Chevy | | | | | | | | | | | DOV; 40 | | | | | | | | | | | | | BRI; 40 | CGV | | | | | | | | | | | 39th | 1249 |
| 2010 | Patrick Long | 90 | Toyota | | | | | | | | | | | | | | | ROA; 14 | | | | | | | | | | | | | | | | | | | | | 39th | 1249 |

=== Car No. 91 results ===
| Year | Driver | No. | Make | 1 | 2 | 3 | 4 | 5 | 6 | 7 | 8 | 9 | 10 | 11 | 12 | 13 | 14 | 15 | 16 | 17 | 18 | 19 | 20 | 21 | 22 | 23 | 24 | 25 | 26 | 27 | 28 | 29 | 30 | 31 | 32 | 33 | 34 | 35 | Owners | Pts |
|---|---|---|---|---|---|---|---|---|---|---|---|---|---|---|---|---|---|---|---|---|---|---|---|---|---|---|---|---|---|---|---|---|---|---|---|---|---|---|---|---|
| 2007 | Bobby Santos III | 91 | Toyota | DAY | CAL | MXC | LVS | ATL | BRI | NSH | TEX | PHO | TAL | RCH; 30 | DAR | | | | | | NHA; 33 | DAY | CHI | GTY | IRP | CGV | GLN | MCH | BRI | CAL | RCH | DOV | KAN | CLT | MEM | TEX | PHO | HOM | 55th | 431 |
| 2007 | David Green | 91 | Toyota | | | | | | | | | | | | | CLT; 28 | DOV | NSH; 11 | KEN; 26 | MLW | | | | | | | | | | | | | | | | | | | 55th | 431 |
| 2008 | Larry Gunselman | 91 | Ford | DAY; DNQ | | | | | | | | | TAL; 43 | | | | | | | | | | | | | | | | | | | | | | | | | | 40th | 1328 |
| 2008 | Larry Gunselman | 91 | Chevy | | CAL; 42 | LVS; 38 | ATL; 39 | BRI; 39 | NSH; 42 | TEX; 41 | PHO; 39 | MXC; 41 | | | | | | | | | | | | | | | | | | | | | | | | | | | 40th | 1328 |
| 2008 | Kenny Hendrick | 91 | Chevy | | | | | | | | | | | RCH; 43 | | CLT; 41 | | | | | | | | | | | | | | | | | | | | | | | 40th | 1328 |
| 2008 | Terry Cook | 91 | Chevy | | | | | | | | | | | | DAR; 41 | | DOV; 41 | | | MLW; 41 | | | | | IRP; 43 | | | | | | | | | CLT; 42 | | | | | 40th | 1328 |
| 2008 | Justin Hobgood | 91 | Chevy | | | | | | | | | | | | | | | NSH; 41 | KEN; 38 | | NHA; DNQ | DAY; DNQ | CHI; DNQ | GTY; 39 | | | | MCH; 40 | BRI; 43 | CAL; 38 | RCH; 41 | DOV; 42 | KAN; 42 | | MEM; 40 | TEX; DNQ | PHO; 41 | | 40th | 1328 |
| 2008 | Scott Steckly | 91 | Chevy | | | | | | | | | | | | | | | | | | | | | | | CGV; 41 | | | | | | | | | | | | | 40th | 1328 |
| 2008 | Michael McDowell | 91 | Chevy | | | | | | | | | | | | | | | | | | | | | | | | GLN; 42 | | | | | | | | | | | | 40th | 1328 |
| 2008 | Todd Bodine | 91 | Chevy | | | | | | | | | | | | | | | | | | | | | | | | | | | | | | | | | | | HOM; 43 | 40th | 1328 |
| 2009 | Terry Cook | 91 | Chevy | DAY; DNQ | CAL; 37 | LVS; 41 | BRI; 40 | TEX; 42 | NSH; 42 | PHO; 42 | | RCH; 41 | DAR; 41 | CLT; 40 | DOV; 41 | | | MLW; 39 | | DAY; DNQ | CHI; 41 | | IRP; 40 | | | MCH; 38 | BRI; 42 | | | | | KAN; 41 | CAL; 41 | CLT; DNQ | | TEX; 41 | PHO; 39 | HOM; 40 | 41st | 1472 |
| 2009 | Justin Hobgood | 91 | Chevy | | | | | | | | TAL; DNQ | | | | | | | | | | | | | | | | | | | RCH; 39 | | | | | MEM; 41 | | | | 41st | 1472 |
| 2009 | Kelly Bires | 91 | Chevy | | | | | | | | | | | | | NSH; 37 | | | NHA; 41 | | | | | | | | | | | | | | | | | | | | 41st | 1472 |
| 2009 | Jeff Green | 91 | Chevy | | | | | | | | | | | | | | KEN; DNQ | | | | | | | | | | | | | | | | | | | | | | 41st | 1472 |
| 2009 | Chase Miller | 91 | Chevy | | | | | | | | | | | | | | | | | | | GTY; 42 | | IOW; 40 | | | | | | | DOV; 39 | | | | | | | | 41st | 1472 |
| 2009 | Dave Blaney | 91 | Chevy | | | | | | | | | | | | | | | | | | | | | | GLN; 13 | | | | ATL; 43 | | | | | | | | | | 41st | 1472 |
| 2009 | Tom Hubert | 91 | Chevy | | | | | | | | | | | | | | | | | | | | | | | | | CGV; 43 | | | | | | | | | | | 41st | 1472 |
| 2010 | Stephen Leicht | 91 | Chevy | DAY | CAL; DNQ | LVS; DNQ | | | | | | | | | | | | | | | | | | | | | | | | | | | | | | | | | 42nd | 1109 |
| 2010 | David Gilliland | 91 | Chevy | | | | BRI; 42 | | PHO; 41 | TEX; 41 | TAL | RCH; 39 | DAR; 41 | DOV; 43 | CLT; 41 | | | | NHA; 38 | DAY | CHI; 39 | | | | | | BRI; 41 | CGV | | | DOV; 38 | KAN; 41 | CAL; 36 | CLT | | TEX; 40 | PHO; 39 | HOM; 40 | 42nd | 1109 |
| 2010 | Chase Miller | 91 | Chevy | | | | | NSH; DNQ | | | | | | | | NSH; 39 | KEN; 39 | ROA | | | | GTY; 36 | IRP; 37 | IOW; 41 | GLN | MCH | | | ATL; 37 | RCH | | | | | GTY; 36 | | | | 42nd | 1109 |

=== Car No. 92 results ===
| Year | Driver | No. | Make | 1 | 2 | 3 | 4 | 5 | 6 | 7 | 8 | 9 | 10 | 11 | 12 | 13 | 14 | 15 | 16 | 17 | 18 | 19 | 20 | 21 | 22 | 23 | 24 | 25 | 26 | 27 | 28 | 29 | 30 | 31 | 32 | 33 | 34 | 35 | Owners | Pts |
|---|---|---|---|---|---|---|---|---|---|---|---|---|---|---|---|---|---|---|---|---|---|---|---|---|---|---|---|---|---|---|---|---|---|---|---|---|---|---|---|---|
| 2007 | Bobby Santos III | 92 | Toyota | DAY | CAL | MXC | LVS | ATL | BRI | NSH | TEX | PHO | TAL | RCH | DAR | CLT | DOV | NSH; 37 | KEN | MLW | NHA | DAY | CHI | GTY | IRP | CGV | GLN | MCH | BRI | CAL | RCH | DOV | KAN | CLT; 39 | MEM | TEX | PHO | HOM | 74th | 98 |
| 2008 | Kyle Busch | 92 | Toyota | DAY | CAL | LVS | ATL | BRI | NSH | TEX | PHO | MXC | TAL | RCH | DAR | CLT | DOV | NSH | KEN | MLW | NHA | DAY | CHI | GTY | IRP | CGV | GLN; 2 | MCH | BRI | CAL | RCH | DOV | KAN | CLT | MEM | TEX | PHO | HOM | 65th | 175 |

== ARCA RE/MAX Series ==
On October 24, 2008, D'Hondt Motorsports announced 20-year-old female Alli Owens would drive for them part-time in the ARCA RE/MAX Series in 2009 with sponsorship from ElectrifyingCareers.com. Owens had career best finishes in 9 of the 10 races she ran for the team then left to join another team in October 2009.

On September 10, 2009 D'Hondt Motorsports announced that they would be running the ARCA RE/MAX Series race at Rockingham Speedway on October 11, debuting 17-year-old Johanna Long, sponsored by Grandma Ruby's. They also announced that Owens would not be returning in 2010.
