= 2006 Neighborhood Excellence 400 =

Race details
- Race 13 of 36 in the 2006 NASCAR Nextel Cup Series season
- 2006 Neighborhood Excellence 400 program cover
- Date: June 4, 2006
- Official name: Neighborhood Excellence 400 presented by Bank of America
- Location: Dover International Speedway, Dover, Delaware
- Course: Permanent racing facility
- Course length: 1 miles (1.609 km)
- Distance: 400 laps, 400 mi (643.738 km)
- Weather: Mild with temperatures approaching 75.2 °F (24.0 °C); wind speeds up to 11.39 miles per hour (18.33 km/h)
- Average speed: 109.865 miles per hour (176.811 km/h)
- Attendance: 145,000

Pole position
Driver	Ryan Newman	Penske Racing
- Time: 23.281

Most laps led
Driver	Jamie McMurray	Roush Racing
- Laps: 95

Winner
No. 17	Matt Kenseth	Roush Racing

Television in the United States
- Network: FX
- Announcers: Mike Joy, Darrell Waltrip and Larry McReynolds

The 2006 Neighborhood Excellence 400 presented by Bank of America was the thirteenth race of the 2006 NASCAR Nextel Cup Series season. It was held on Sunday, June 4, 2006, at Dover International Speedway in Dover, Delaware and contested over 400 laps and 400 miles (640 kilometres) on the 1-mile (1.6-kilometre) concrete oval. Matt Kenseth of Roush Racing won the race, giving him his second win of the season. Jamie McMurray, his teammate, finished second and Kevin Harvick finished third. Ricky Rudd made a brief return to the Cup Series in relief of Tony Stewart.

== Qualifying ==
Pos	Car #	Driver	Make	Primary Sponsor	Speed	Time	Behind
1	12	Ryan Newman	Dodge	Alltel	154.633	23.281	0.000
2	19	Jeremy Mayfield	Dodge	Dodge Dealers / UAW	154.361	23.322	-0.041
3	24	Jeff Gordon	Chevrolet	DuPont	154.063	23.367	-0.086
4	2	Kurt Busch	Dodge	Miller Lite	153.774	23.411	-0.130
5	29	Kevin Harvick	Chevrolet	GM Goodwrench	153.662	23.428	-0.147
6	6	Mark Martin	Ford	AAA Insurance	153.531	23.448	-0.167
7	11	Denny Hamlin	Chevrolet	FedEx Kinko's	153.466	23.458	-0.177
8	38	Elliott Sadler	Ford	M&M's	153.302	23.483	-0.202
9	26	Jamie McMurray	Ford	IRWIN Industrial Tools	153.146	23.507	-0.226
10	20	Ricky Rudd	Chevrolet	The Home Depot	152.931	23.540	-0.259
11	8	Dale Earnhardt Jr	Chevrolet	Budweiser	152.847	23.553	-0.272
12	66	Jeff Green	Chevrolet	Windows Live OneCare	152.769	23.565	-0.284
13	01	Joe Nemechek	Chevrolet	U.S. Army	152.769	23.565	-0.284
14	18	JJ Yeley	Chevrolet	Imitrex / GSK	152.626	23.587	-0.306
15	10	Scott Riggs	Dodge	Valvoline / Stanley Tools	152.588	23.593	-0.312
16	00	Hermie Sadler	Chevrolet	UWFUSA.com	152.588	23.593	-0.312
17	31	Jeff Burton	Chevrolet	Cingular Wireless	152.581	23.594	-0.313
18	49	Kevin Lepage	Dodge	State Water Heaters	152.542	23.600	-0.319
19	17	Matt Kenseth	Ford	DEWALT	152.478	23.610	-0.329
20	16	Greg Biffle	Ford	National Guard	152.342	23.631	-0.350
21	1	Martin Truex Jr	Chevrolet	Bass Pro Shops / Tracker	152.336	23.632	-0.351
22	7	Clint Bowyer	Chevrolet	Jack Daniel's	152.329	23.633	-0.352
23	14	Sterling Marlin	Chevrolet	Waste Management	152.220	23.650	-0.369
24	25	Brian Vickers	Chevrolet	GMAC	152.123	23.665	-0.384
25	99	Carl Edwards	Ford	Office Depot	151.841	23.709	-0.428
26	9	Kasey Kahne	Dodge	Dodge Dealers / UAW	151.803	23.715	-0.434
27	32	Travis Kvapil	Chevrolet	Tide-Downy	151.260	23.800	-0.519
28	43	Bobby Labonte	Dodge	Cheerios / Betty Crocker	151.235	23.804	-0.523
29	40	David Stremme	Dodge	Lone Star Steakhouse / Saloon	151.197	23.810	-0.529
30	5	Kyle Busch	Chevrolet	Kellogg's	151.045	23.834	-0.553
31	22	Dave Blaney	Dodge	Caterpillar	150.975	23.845	-0.564
32	96	Tony Raines	Chevrolet	DLP HDTV	150.918	23.854	-0.573
33	55	Michael Waltrip	Dodge	NAPA Auto Parts	150.710	23.887	-0.606
34	42	Casey Mears	Dodge	Texaco / Havoline	150.640	23.898	-0.617
35	45	Kyle Petty	Dodge	Wells Fargo	150.552	23.912	-0.631
36	74	Derrike Cope	Dodge	Sundance Vacations / Royal Admin. Svcs	150.546	23.913	-0.632
37	78	Kenny Wallace	Chevrolet	Furniture Row Racing	150.533	23.915	-0.634
38	21	Ken Schrader	Ford	Little Debbie	150.432	23.931	-0.650
39	41	Reed Sorenson	Dodge	Target	150.275	23.956	-0.675
40	88	Dale Jarrett	Ford	UPS	150.175	23.972	-0.691
41	7	Robby Gordon	Chevrolet	Menards / MAPEI	149.514	24.078	-0.797
42	48	Jimmie Johnson	Chevrolet	Lowe's	146.484	24.576	-1.295
43	4	Scott Wimmer	Chevrolet	AERO Exhaust	150.483	23.923	-0.642
Failed to qualify
44	95	Stanton Barrett	Chevrolet	TheRaceSpace.com		23.947	
45	34	Carl Long	Chevrolet	Oak Glove Co.		24.250	
46	61	Chad Chaffin	Dodge	Continental Fire & Safety / RoadLoans	0.000	0.000	0.000
47	52	Donnie Neuenberger	Dodge	Cox Mechanical / Plan B Tool	0.000	0.000	0.000

== Results ==
POS	ST	#	DRIVER	SPONSOR / OWNER	CAR	LAPS	MONEY	STATUS	LED	PTS
1	19	17	Matt Kenseth	DeWalt (Jack Roush)	Ford	400	323591	running	83	185
2	9	26	Jamie McMurray	Irwin Industrial Tools (Jack Roush)	Ford	400	239600	running	95	180
3	5	29	Kevin Harvick	GM Goodwrench (Richard Childress)	Chevrolet	400	198586	running	0	165
4	17	31	Jeff Burton	Cingular Wireless (Richard Childress)	Chevrolet	400	164245	running	48	165
5	30	5	Kyle Busch	Kellogg's (Rick Hendrick)	Chevrolet	400	132925	running	22	160
6	42	48	Jimmie Johnson	Lowe's (Rick Hendrick)	Chevrolet	400	153261	running	0	150
7	26	9	Kasey Kahne	Dodge Dealers / UAW (Ray Evernham)	Dodge	400	135039	running	0	146
8	20	16	Greg Biffle	National Guard (Jack Roush)	Ford	400	112800	running	2	147
9	6	6	Mark Martin	AAA Insurance (Jack Roush)	Ford	400	107950	running	39	143
10	11	8	Dale Earnhardt Jr.	Budweiser (Dale Earnhardt, Inc.)	Chevrolet	400	130241	running	1	139
11	7	11	Denny Hamlin	FedEx Kinko's (Joe Gibbs)	Chevrolet	400	94200	running	0	130
12	3	24	Jeff Gordon	DuPont (Rick Hendrick)	Chevrolet	400	133011	running	81	132
13	28	43	Bobby Labonte	Cheerios / Betty Crocker (Petty Enterprises)	Dodge	400	126136	running	0	124
14	1	12	Ryan Newman	Alltel (Roger Penske)	Dodge	400	134533	running	12	126
15	25	99	Carl Edwards	Office Depot (Jack Roush)	Ford	400	104125	running	2	123
16	4	2	Kurt Busch	Miller Lite (Roger Penske)	Dodge	400	122658	running	0	115
17	22	07	Clint Bowyer	Jack Daniel's (Richard Childress)	Chevrolet	400	93150	running	0	112
18	2	19	Jeremy Mayfield	Dodge Dealers / UAW (Ray Evernham)	Dodge	400	120316	running	14	114
19	39	41	Reed Sorenson	Target (Chip Ganassi)	Dodge	400	91600	running	0	106
20	15	10	Scott Riggs	Valvoline / Stanley Tools (James Rocco)	Dodge	400	85200	running	0	103
21	34	42	Casey Mears	Texaco / Havoline (Chip Ganassi)	Dodge	400	116983	running	0	100
22	21	1	Martin Truex Jr.	Bass Pro Shops / Tracker (Dale Earnhardt, Inc.)	Chevrolet	399	107783	running	0	97
23	24	25	Brian Vickers	GMAC (Rick Hendrick)	Chevrolet	399	89925	running	0	94
24	40	88	Dale Jarrett	UPS (Yates Racing)	Ford	399	112400	running	0	91
25	10	20	Tony Stewart	Home Depot / Powerade (Joe Gibbs)	Chevrolet	398	130786	running	0	88
26	32	96	Tony Raines	DLP HDTV (Bill Saunders)	Chevrolet	398	79100	running	0	85
27	35	45	Kyle Petty	Wells Fargo (Petty Enterprises)	Dodge	398	102608	running	0	82
28	12	66	Jeff Green	Windows Live OneCare (Gene Haas)	Chevrolet	398	99958	running	0	79
29	27	32	Travis Kvapil	Tide / Downy (Cal Wells)	Chevrolet	398	89308	running	0	76
30	31	22	Dave Blaney	Caterpillar (Bill Davis)	Dodge	398	87047	running	0	73
31	23	14	Sterling Marlin	Waste Management (Nelson Bowers)	Chevrolet	398	74350	running	0	70
32	33	55	Michael Waltrip	NAPA Auto Parts (Doug Bawel)	Dodge	397	74200	running	0	67
33	38	21	Ken Schrader	Little Debbie (Wood Brothers)	Ford	397	102214	running	0	64
34	43	4	Scott Wimmer	AERO Exhaust (Larry McClure)	Chevrolet	396	73850	running	0	61
35	13	01	Joe Nemechek	U.S. Army (Nelson Bowers)	Chevrolet	396	99995	running	0	58
36	41	7	Robby Gordon	Menards / MAPEI (Robby Gordon)	Chevrolet	394	73525	running	0	55
37	36	74	Derrike Cope	Sundance Vacations / Royal Admin. Svc (Raynard McGlynn)	Dodge	393	73375	running	0	52
38	37	78	Kenny Wallace	Furniture Row Racing (Barney Visser)	Chevrolet	378	73265	running	0	49
39	18	49	Kevin Lepage	State Water Heaters (Beth Ann Morgenthau)	Dodge	299	73155	engine	0	46
40	8	38	Elliott Sadler	M&M's (Yates Racing)	Ford	296	100933	crash	0	43
41	29	40	David Stremme	Lone Star Steakhouse & Saloon (Chip Ganassi)	Dodge	290	80895	overheating	1	45
42	14	18	J.J. Yeley	Imitrex (Joe Gibbs)	Chevrolet	286	107385	crash	0	37
43	16	00	Hermie Sadler	UWFUSA.com (Mike Anderson)	Chevrolet	136	73033	transmission	0	34
Failed to qualify, withdrew, or driver changes:
POS	NAME	NBR	SPONSOR	OWNER	CAR					
44	Stanton Barrett	95	TheRaceSpace.com	Stanton Barrett	Chevrolet					
45	Carl Long	34	Oak Glove Co.	Bob Jenkins	Chevrolet					
46	Chad Chaffin	61	Continental Fire & Safety / RoadLoans	Jeff Stec	Dodge					
47	Donnie Neuenberger	52	Cox Mechanical / Plan B Tool	Rick Ware	Dodge					
DC	Ricky Rudd	20	Home Depot / Powerade	Joe Gibbs	Chevrolet					

Failed to qualify: Carl Long (#34), Donnie Neuenberger (#52), Chad Chaffin (#61), and Stanton Barrett (#95).

== Race statistics ==
- Time of race: 3:38:27
- Average Speed: 109.865 miles per hour (176.811 km/h)
- Pole Speed: 154.633 miles per hour (248.858 km/h)
- Cautions: 9 for 51 laps
- Margin of Victory: 0.787 seconds
- Lead changes: 23
- Percent of race run under caution: 12.8%
- Average green flag run: 34.9 laps

Previous race: 2006 Coca-Cola 600	Nextel Cup Series; 2006 season	Next race: 2006 Pocono 500
