= Brian Johnson Jr. =

American racing driver

- Born: May 17, 1979 (age 47)
- Achievements: 2009 ARCA West Series Champion

NASCAR FedEx Freight Truck Series career
- 4 races run over 2 years
- Best finish: 60th (2011)
- First race: 2010 Kroger 250 (Martinsville)
- Last race: 2011 Fast Five 225 (Joliet)
Wins	Top tens	Poles
0	0	0
- Statistics up to date as of February 10, 2012.

Brian Johnson Jr. (born May 17, 1979) is an American stock car racing driver. He last drove the No. 73 Chevrolet Silverado for Tagsby Racing in the NASCAR Camping World Truck Series.

== Racing career ==
Johnson started competing in the ASA Midwest Tour in 2007, he competed in ten events and posted four top-tens and two top-fives and finished tenth in the point standings. In 2008, he competed on a part-time basis in the ARCA West Series racing in three events, posting a win at Auto Clearing Motor Speedway along with two top-fives and two top-tens as well as one pole. Johnson would win the 2009 ARCA West Series Championship in domination fashion. He posted three wins, five top-fives, six top-tens and five poles in eight total races.

=== NASCAR ===
In March 2010, Johnson signed on to drive select races with Ray Hackett Racing starting with the Kroger 250 at Martinsville Speedway. Johnson started the race in 28th position and finished 32nd after a Lap 114 accident. In Johnson's next race, the Nashville 200 at Nashville Superspeedway, he would start 31st and finish in 30th position.

== Motorsports career results ==
=== NASCAR ===
(key) (Bold – Pole position awarded by qualifying time. Italics – Pole position earned by points standings or practice time. * – Most laps led.)

==== Camping World Truck Series ====
NASCAR Camping World Truck Series results
Year	Team	No.	Make	1	2	3	4	5	6	7	8	9	10	11	12	13	14	15	16	17	18	19	20	21	22	23	24	25	NCWTC	Pts	Ref
2010	Ray Hackett Racing	76	Ford	DAY	ATL	MAR; 32	NSH; 30	KAN	DOV	CLT	TEX	MCH	IOW	GTY	IRP	POC	NSH	DAR	BRI	CHI	KEN	NHA	LVS	MAR	TAL	TEX	PHO		86th	140	
2010	Tagsby Racing	73	Chevy																									HOM; DNQ	86th	140	
2011	Tagsby Racing	73	Chevy	DAY	PHO	DAR	MAR	NSH; DNQ	DOV	CLT	KAN	TEX	KEN	IOW	NSH	IRP	POC	MCH	BRI; 27	ATL	CHI; 26	NHA	KEN	LVS	TAL	MAR	TEX	HOM	60th	35	

=== ARCA Re/Max Series ===
(key) (Bold – Pole position awarded by qualifying time. Italics – Pole position earned by points standings or practice time. * – Most laps led.)

ARCA Re/Max Series results
Year	Team	No.	Make	1	2	3	4	5	6	7	8	9	10	11	12	13	14	15	16	17	18	19	20	21	ARSC	Pts	Ref
2009	Venturini Motorsports	35	Chevy	DAY	SLM	CAR	TAL	KEN	TOL; 33	POC	MCH	MFD	IOW	KEN	BLN	POC	ISF	CHI	TOL	DSF	NJE	SLM	KAN	CAR	151st	65	
