= Ray Hackett Racing =

Former NASCAR team

- Owner: Ray Hackett
- Base: Salisbury, North Carolina
- Series: Camping World Truck Series; Nationwide Series; ARCA Racing Series
- Race drivers: Rick Crawford, Ryan Hackett, Brian Johnson Jr., Ryan Mathews, Donnie Neuenberger, Alli Owens
- Manufacturer: Ford

Career
- Debut: Nationwide Series: 2008 Lipton Tea 250 (Richmond); Camping World Truck Series: 2008 Ford 200 (Homestead); ARCA Re/Max Series: 2005 Hantz Group 200 (Michigan)
- Latest race: Camping World Truck Series: 2012 Fred's 250 (Talladega); ARCA Re/Max Series: 2008 Kentuckiana Ford Dealers 200 (Salem)
- Races competed: Total: 24; Nationwide Series: 1 Camping World Truck Series: 17; ARCA Re/Max Series: 6
- Drivers' Championships: Total: 0 Nationwide Series: 0 Camping World Truck Series: 0 ARCA Re/Max Series: 0
- Race victories: Total: 0 Nationwide Series: 0 Camping World Truck Series: 0 ARCA Re/Max Series: 0
- Pole positions: Total: 0 Nationwide Series: 0 Camping World Truck Series: 0 ARCA Re/Max Series: 0

Ray Hackett Racing (RHR) was a stock car racing team owned by Ray Hackett. The team competed from 2005 to 2012, fielding entries in the NASCAR Nationwide Series, NASCAR Camping World Truck Series and ARCA Re/Max Series. Ryan Hackett started the majority of the races the team competed in.

== Nationwide Series ==
The team made its NASCAR Nationwide Series debut at Richmond International Raceway, where Ryan Hackett finished 35th. Hackett failed to qualify at Nashville Superspeedway and Bristol Motor Speedway later that year.

On April 4, 2009, RHR announced plans for a limited NASCAR Nationwide Series schedule, starting at Nashville Superspeedway with Hackett behind the wheel. He failed to qualify at Nashville and did not attempt a Nationwide race for the rest of the season.

Hackett failed to qualify in his only attempt of the 2010 season, which came at Bristol Motor Speedway.

For 2012, the team moved into a new race shop in Salisbury, North Carolina and signed Donnie Neuenberger to drive the season-opening race at Daytona International Speedway. He failed to qualify.

=== Car No. 76 results ===
Year	Driver	No.	Make	1	2	3	4	5	6	7	8	9	10	11	12	13	14	15	16	17	18	19	20	21	22	23	24	25	26	27	28	29	30	31	32	33	34	35	Owners	Pts
2008	Ryan Hackett	76	Ford	DAY	CAL	LVS	ATL	BRI	NSH	TEX	PHO	MXC	TAL	RCH; 35	DAR	CLT	DOV	NSH; DNQ	KEN	MLW	NHA	DAY	CHI	GTY	IRP	CGV	GLN	MCH	BRI; DNQ	CAL	RCH	DOV	KAN	CLT	MEM	TEX	PHO	HOM		
2009	Ryan Hackett	76	Ford	DAY	CAL	LVS	BRI	TEX	NSH; DNQ	PHO	TAL	RCH	DAR	CLT	DOV	NSH	KEN	MLW	NHA	DAY	CHI	GTY	IRP	IOW	GLN	MCH	BRI	CGV	ATL	RCH	DOV	KAN	CAL	CLT	MEM	TEX	PHO	HOM		
2010	Ryan Hackett	76	Ford	DAY	CAL	LVS	BRI	NSH	PHO	TEX	TAL	RCH	DAR	DOV	CLT	NSH	KEN	ROA	NHA	DAY	CHI	GTY	IRP	IOW	GLN	MCH	BRI; DNQ	CGV	ATL	RCH	DOV	KAN	CAL	CLT	GTY	TEX	PHO	HOM		
2012	Donnie Neuenberger	76	Ford	DAY; DNQ	PHO	LVS	BRI	CAL	TEX	RCH	TAL	DAR	IOW	CLT	DOV	MCH	ROA	KEN	DAY	NHA	CHI	IND	IOW	GLN	CGV	BRI	ATL	RCH	CHI	KEN	DOV	CLT	KAN	TEX	PHO	HOM				

== Camping World Truck Series ==
=== No. 75 history ===
A second RHR entry, Ryan Mathews drove the No. 75 in two events in 2009 with a best finish of 25th.

==== Truck No. 75 results ====
Year	Driver	No.	Make	1	2	3	4	5	6	7	8	9	10	11	12	13	14	15	16	17	18	19	20	21	22	23	24	25	Owners	Pts
2009	Ryan Mathews	75	Ford	DAY	CAL	ATL	MAR	KAN	CLT	DOV	TEX; 25	MCH; 26	MLW	MEM	KEN	IRP	NSH	BRI	CHI	IOW	GTW	NHA	LVS	MAR	TAL	TEX	PHO	HOM		

=== No. 76 history ===
RHR made its NASCAR Camping World Truck Series debut in the 2008 season finale, where Ryan Hackett finished 34th at Homestead-Miami Speedway.

Hackett drove seven races in 2009, and recorded a top-twenty finish at Charlotte Motor Speedway.

In 2010, Hackett drove the first two races of the season for the team. RHR then signed Brian Johnson Jr. to a two-race deal after seeing him race in the Toyota All-Star Showdown in January. Johnson drove for the team at Martinsville Speedway and Nashville Superspeedway. The team later signed Truck Series veteran Rick Crawford to drive the No. 76 at Kansas Speedway. A potential full-time schedule was disrupted by sponsorship issues after five races.

Before the 2011 season, RHR signed Alli Owens to run the season-opening race at Daytona International Speedway. Owens failed to make the field by five spots. Hackett made the team's only other 2011 attempt, finishing 22nd at Talladega Superspeedway.

The team's only race in 2012 was with Hackett driving at Talladega; he finished 17th.

==== Truck No. 76 results ====
Year	Driver	No.	Make	1	2	3	4	5	6	7	8	9	10	11	12	13	14	15	16	17	18	19	20	21	22	23	24	25	Owners	Pts
2008	Ryan Hackett	76	Ford	DAY	CAL	ATL	MAR	KAN	CLT	MFD	DOV	TEX	MCH	MLW	MEM	KEN	IRP	NSH	BRI	GTW	NHA	LVS	TAL	MAR	ATL	TEX	PHO	HOM; 31		
2009	Ryan Hackett	76	Ford	DAY	CAL	ATL	MAR	KAN; 28	CLT; 18	DOV; 29	TEX; 27	MCH; 22	MLW	MEM	KEN; 33	IRP	NSH	BRI	CHI; DNQ	IOW	GTW	NHA	LVS	MAR	TAL; 31	TEX	PHO	HOM		
2010	Ryan Hackett	76	Ford	DAY; 15	ATL; 30									GTY; DNQ	IRP	POC	NSH	DAR	BRI	CHI	KEN	NHA	LVS	MAR	TAL	TEX	PHO	HOM		
2010	Brian Johnson Jr.	76	Ford			MAR; 32	NSH; 30																							
2010	Rick Crawford	76	Ford					KAN; 31	DOV	CLT	TEX	MCH	IOW																	
2011	Alli Owens	76	Ford	DAY; DNQ	PHO	DAR	MAR	NSH	DOV	CLT	KAN	TEX	KEN	IOW	NSH	IRP	POC	MCH	BRI	ATL	CHI	NHA	KEN	LVS						
2011	Ryan Hackett	76	Ford																						TAL; 22	MAR				
2011	Derek White	76	Ford																								TEX; DNQ	HOM; DNQ		
2012	Derek White	76	Ford	DAY; DNQ	MAR	CAR	KAN	CLT	DOV	TEX	KEN	IOW	CHI	POC	MCH	BRI	ATL	IOW	KEN	LVS										
2012	Ryan Hackett	76	Ford																		TAL; 17	MAR	TEX	PHO	HOM					

== ARCA Re/Max Series ==
Ryan Hackett drove six ARCA Re/Max Series races for the team between 2005 and 2008, scoring a best race finish of 12th.
