= Ryan Mathews (racing driver) =

American racing driver (born 1978)

- Born: July 1, 1978 (age 48); Lake Geneva, Wisconsin, U.S.

NASCAR FedEx Freight Truck Series career
- 19 races run over 3 years
- Best finish: 24th (2007)
- First race: 2007 Ohio 250 (Mansfield)
- Last race: 2009 Lucas Oil 200 (Iowa)
Wins	Top tens	Poles
0	2	1
- Statistics up to date as of November 19, 2013.

Ryan Mathews (born July 1, 1978) is an American stock car racing driver from Lake Geneva, Wisconsin. He was a part-time driver of the No. 75 Ray Hackett Racing Ford in the NASCAR Craftsman Truck Series in 2009. His career also went through ASA, ARCA, and the NASCAR K&N Pro Series East.

== Background ==
Mathews' education background is in engineering from Kettering University in Flint, Michigan. During his time there, he also served as a contributing member of Kappa Sigma chapter of Theta Xi fraternity.

Mathews began racing in a kart at the age fof fifteen. He moved to a mini-sprint car at Wilmot Speedway in Wilmot, Wisconsin, and was the track rookie of the year and fourth overall. He finished second in mini-sprint points at Wilmot in 1996, and fourth overall in the Wisconsin Mini-sprint Association (which included races at the Calumet County Racing Association). He had five wins on the season, and recorded three wins at Wilmot in 1997. Late in 1997, he raced the one mile dirt track at Springfield, Illinois, in an ARCA series event.

Mathews moved to the Mid-American SuperTruck Series on asphalt in 1998. He had three top-five finishes as a rookie, and two features wins and a pole position in 1999 and 2000. He then moved to the Super Late Models at Slinger Super Speedway in 2001, and was the series Rookie of the Year.

In 2003, Mathews quit his job as an engineer at Harley Davidson to race full-time. He competed in the Midwest All-Star Racing Series (MARS), and he won his fiftieth race on a short track that season. He competed in the Slinger Nationals, and finished fifth against nationally known drivers. Another season highlight was finishing third at Madison International Speedway ahead of Kurt Busch and Matt Kenseth. He moved to the American Speed Association National Series in 2004 as well as selected Super Late Model events. In 2005. he competed in six different Super Late Model series from Minnesota to Florida. He earned 34 top-tens, seventeen top-fives, and one win during the 2005 season. He also finished top-five in points in three major touring series that same year. In 2006, he competed in the ARCA series with Eddie Sharp Racing where his best finish was second at Michigan Speedway.

== NASCAR career ==
Mathews started racing in the Craftsman Truck Series at the seventh race of 2007 for Bill Davis Racing after Tyler Walker was suspended for violating NASCAR's substance abuse policy, and the team had lost its sponsor. He earned his first pole position on July 13, 2007, at Kentucky Speedway, and finished fourth in the race. His other top-ten finish in 2007 was a sixth-place finish at Memphis Motorsports Park. Mathews competed in one NASCAR event in 2008 for the newly formed CHS Motorsports. The one event was the Chevy Silverado 350K at Texas Motor Speedway. He would start the race in 34th and finish 33rd. For the 2009 season, Mathews signed on to drive in select races for Ray Hackett Racing in the No. 75 Ford F-150, starting with the WinStar World Casino 400 at Texas Motor Speedway. He would also drive select races for CHS Motorsports.

== Motorsports career results ==
=== NASCAR ===
(key) (Bold – Pole position awarded by qualifying time. Italics – Pole position earned by points standings or practice time. * – Most laps led.)

==== Camping World Truck Series ====
NASCAR Camping World Truck Series results
Year	Team	No.	Make	1	2	3	4	5	6	7	8	9	10	11	12	13	14	15	16	17	18	19	20	21	22	23	24	25	NCWTC	Pts	Ref
2007	Bill Davis Racing	36	Toyota	DAY	CAL	ATL	MAR	KAN	CLT	MFD; 18	DOV; 15	TEX; 21	MCH; 16	MLW; 14	MEM; 6														24th	1494	
2007	Bill Davis Racing	22	Toyota													**KEN**; 4	IRP; 25	NSH; 16	BRI; 31	GTW; 18	NHA; 13	LVS	TAL	MAR					24th	1494	
2007	Bobby Hamilton Racing	4	Dodge																						ATL; 16	TEX	PHO	HOM	24th	1494	
2008	CHS Motorsports	41	Dodge	DAY	CAL	ATL	MAR	KAN	CLT	MFD	DOV	TEX	MCH	MLW	MEM	KEN	IRP	NSH	BRI	GTW	NHA	LVS	TAL	MAR	ATL	TEX; 33	PHO	HOM	108th	64	
2009	Ray Hackett Racing	75	Ford	DAY	CAL	ATL	MAR	KAN	CLT	DOV	TEX; 25	MCH; 26	MLW	MEM															67th	195	
2009	CHS Motorsports	41	Dodge												KEN; DNQ	IRP	NSH; 29	BRI	CHI; 35	IOW; 34	GTW	NHA	LVS	MAR	TAL	TEX	PHO	HOM	67th	195	

==== K&N Pro Series East ====
NASCAR K&N Pro Series East results
Year	Team	No.	Make	1	2	3	4	5	6	7	8	9	10	11	12	13	14	NKNPSEC	Pts	Ref
2013	Ray Hackett Racing	76	Ford	BRI	GRE	FIF	RCH	BGS	IOW	LGY	COL	IOW	VIR	GRE	NHA	DOV	RAL; 19	63rd	25	

=== ARCA Re/Max Series ===
(key) (Bold – Pole position awarded by qualifying time. Italics – Pole position earned by points standings or practice time. * – Most laps led.)

ARCA Re/Max Series results
Year	Team	No.	Make	1	2	3	4	5	6	7	8	9	10	11	12	13	14	15	16	17	18	19	20	21	22	23	ARSC	Pts	Ref
1997	Bigelow Racing	12	Pontiac	DAY	ATL	SLM	CLT	CLT	POC	MCH	SBS	TOL	KIL	FRS	MIN	POC	MCH	DSF	GTW	SLM	WIN	CLT	TAL	ISF; 36	ATL		NA	-	
2006	Eddie Sharp Racing	22	Dodge	DAY	NSH	SLM	WIN	KEN	TOL; 18	POC	MCH; 13	KAN; 13	KEN; 41			GTW; 7	NSH; 25	MCH; 2	ISF	MIL; 5	TOL	DSF	CHI; DNQ	SLM; 12	TAL	IOW	28th	1630	
2006	Cunningham Motorsports	4	Dodge											BLN; 6	POC												28th	1630	
2007	Cunningham Motorsports	4	Dodge	DAY	USA; 31	NSH	SLM	KAN	WIN	KEN	TOL	IOW	POC	MCH	BLN	KEN	POC	NSH	ISF	MIL	GTW	DSF	CHI	SLM	TAL	TOL	162nd	75	

=== CARS Super Late Model Tour ===
(key)

CARS Super Late Model Tour results
Year	Team	No.	Make	1	2	3	4	5	6	7	8	9	CSLMTC	Pts	Ref
2018	Ryan Mathews	21	Ford	MYB	NSH	ROU	HCY	BRI	AND	HCY; DNQ	ROU	SBO; 16	44th	19	
