= Alli Owens =

American racing driver (born 1988)

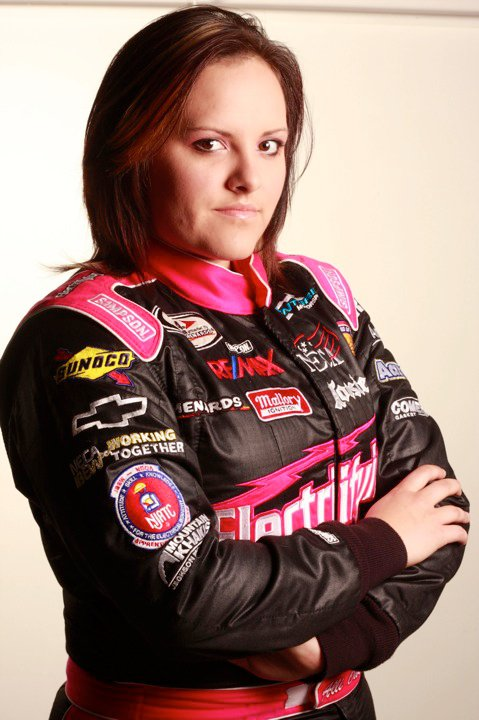
- Owens in 2010
- Born: Alexandra Owens; September 2, 1988 (age 38); South Daytona, Florida, U.S.

NASCAR O'Reilly Auto Parts Series career
- 1 race run over 1 year
- 2016 position: 79th
- Best finish: 79th (2016)
- First race: 2016 Virginia 529 College Savings 250 (Richmond)
Wins	Top tens	Poles
0	0	0

ARCA Menards Series career
- 34 races run over 4 years
- ARCA no., team: No. 68 (Kimmel Racing); No. 93 (Costner Motorsports)
- Best finish: 20th (2009)
- First race: 2008 ARCA 200 at Daytona (Daytona)
- Last race: 2026 Alabama Manufactured Housing 200 (Talladega)
Wins	Top tens	Poles
0	3	0
- Statistics up to date as of April 25, 2026.

Alexandra "Alli" Owens (born September 2, 1988) is an American professional stock car racing driver. She competes part-time in the ARCA Menards Series, driving the No. 68 Ford for Kimmel Racing, and the No. 93 Chevrolet for Costner Motorsports. She previously competed part-time in the NASCAR Xfinity Series, driving the No. 97 Chevrolet Camaro for Obaika Racing, and part-time in the then ARCA Racing Series from 2008 to 2010.

== Racing career ==
Owens began racing in BMX bicycles at the age of eight which put her on a path to train for the Olympics, but she switched to racing on four wheels at age twelve. Starting out in quarter midgets, she competed in local dirt track races and then raced cars on pavement by age fifteen.

Owens made her ARCA Re/Max Series debut in 2008, driving a limited schedule in the No. 12 ElectriyingCareers.com Chevrolet for DGM Racing, owned by Mario Gosselin. In her twelve races that year, she had a best race finish of 15th place, which she achieved on three occasions (Rockingham, Kentucky and Chicago).

In 2009, Owens and her sponsor moved from DGM to D'Hondt Motorsports to run ten races in the No. 19 Toyota. Owens had a career best second place starting spot in the season opening Lucas Oil Slick Mist 200 at Daytona, but would finish 40th after an early accident. Additionally, she would score her first top-ten finish as well career best sixth-place finish at Talladega in April, and would follow that up with another top-ten in her next start at Pocono.

In 2010, Owens would race in nine events with Venturini Motorsports, who she raced with in her last race of the 2009 season in preparation for the following year. ElectrifyingCareers.com returned as her sponsor. Owens ran third at Daytona in February 2010 for more than half the race before being shuffled out of the draft. She would score one top-ten finish, a ninth place showing at Salem in April.

Owens would make the jump to the NASCAR Camping World Truck Series for the 2011 season, driving the No. 76 Ford for Ray Hackett Racing. However, just a few months prior to the season, she would learn that her sponsor, ElectrifyingCareers.com, would be unable to renew their sponsorship. She was able to raise enough donations through fans and local businesses to make it to the season-opening race, though she failed to qualify. It was her only race of the season. Owens did receive offers from sponsors, but declined some of them because they wanted her to do a bikini photoshoot like other female racing drivers have done. She would then be without a ride in NASCAR and ARCA for about five years. However, in January 2012, Owens did return to ARCA in the series' offseason Daytona test session, driving the No. 1 for Andy Belmont with sponsorship from Baby Jock. Despite this, she did not end up attempting the race there the following month. She was seeking a ride in 2012 in either NASCAR or ARCA, however, she did not end up getting one due to lack of sponsorship.

In late August 2016, it was announced that Owens would drive the No. 97 Chevrolet Camaro for Obaika Racing at Richmond International Raceway, making her Xfinity Series debut.

In November 2025, it was announced Owens would compete for Kimmel Racing in 2026 for five to eight races, starting at Daytona. She would also participate with the team in the pre-season test for the ARCA Menards Series at the same track, where she set the 19th quickest time between the two sessions held.

== Personal life ==
Owens is a native of South Daytona, Florida. She got married and then had two children. After she attempted the Daytona Truck race in 2011, she became pregnant with her first child and had to step away from racing for the rest of the season. Her baby was born later that year in October.

== Motorsports career results ==
=== Stock car career summary ===
Season	Series	Team	Races	Wins	Top 5	Top 10	Points	Position
2008	2008 ARCA Re/Max Series	DGM Racing	12	0	0	0	1530	24th
2009	ARCA Re/Max Series	D'Hondt Motorsports	10	0	0	2	1895	20th
2009	ARCA Re/Max Series	Venturini Motorsports	1	0	0	0	1895	20th
2010	ARCA Racing Series	Venturini Motorsports	8	0	0	1	1410	22nd
2011	NASCAR Camping World Truck Series	Ray Hackett Racing	0	0	0	0	0	119th
2016	NASCAR Xfinity Series	Obaika Racing	1	0	0	0	5	79th
2026	ARCA Menards Series	Kimmel Racing	1	0	0	0	14	129th
2026	ARCA Menards Series	Costner Motorsports	1	0	0	0	14	129th

=== NASCAR ===
(key) (Bold – Pole position awarded by qualifying time. Italics – Pole position earned by points standings or practice time. * – Most laps led.)

==== Xfinity Series ====
NASCAR Xfinity Series results
Year	Team	No.	Make	1	2	3	4	5	6	7	8	9	10	11	12	13	14	15	16	17	18	19	20	21	22	23	24	25	26	27	28	29	30	31	32	33	NXSC	Pts	Ref
2016	Obaika Racing	97	Chevy	DAY	ATL	LVS	PHO	CAL	TEX	BRI	RCH	TAL	DOV	CLT	POC	MCH	IOW	DAY	KEN	NHA	IND	IOW	GLN	MOH	BRI	ROA	DAR	RCH; 36	CHI	KEN	DOV	CLT	KAN	TEX	PHO	HOM	79th	5	

==== Camping World Truck Series ====
NASCAR Camping World Truck Series results
Year	Team	No.	Make	1	2	3	4	5	6	7	8	9	10	11	12	13	14	15	16	17	18	19	20	21	22	23	24	25	NCWTC	Pts	Ref
2011	Ray Hackett Racing	76	Ford	DAY; DNQ	PHO	DAR	MAR	NSH	DOV	CLT	KAN	TEX	KEN	IOW	NSH	IRP	POC	MCH	BRI	ATL	CHI	NHA	KEN	LVS	TAL	MAR	TEX	HOM	119th	0^{1}	

=== ARCA Menards Series ===
(key) (Bold – Pole position awarded by qualifying time. Italics – Pole position earned by points standings or practice time. * – Most laps led.)

ARCA Menards Series results
Year	Team	No.	Make	1	2	3	4	5	6	7	8	9	10	11	12	13	14	15	16	17	18	19	20	21	AMSC	Pts	Ref
2008	DGM Racing	12	Chevy	DAY; 41	SLM	IOW; 27	KAN; 18	CAR; 15	KEN	TOL	POC; 24	MCH; 24	CAY	KEN; 15	BLN	POC	NSH; 29	ISF	DSF	CHI; 15	SLM	NJE; 27	TAL; 41	TOL; 22	24th	1530	
2009	D'Hondt Motorsports	19	Toyota	DAY; 40	SLM	CAR; 12	TAL; 6	KEN	TOL	POC; 10	MCH; 16	MFD	IOW	KEN; 13	BLN	POC; 22	ISF	CHI; 19	TOL	DSF	NJE; 17	SLM	KAN; 12		20th	1895	
2009	Venturini Motorsports	35	Chevy																					CAR; 13	20th	1895	
2010	Venturini Motorsports	15	Chevy	DAY; 23	PBE	SLM; 9	TEX; 24	TAL; 32	TOL	POC; 20	MCH; 13	IOW	MFD	POC	BLN	NJE		CHI; 14	DSF	TOL	SLM	KAN	CAR		22nd	1410	
2010	Venturini Motorsports	15	Toyota														ISF; 30								22nd	1410	
2026	Kimmel Racing	68	Ford	DAY; 34	PHO	KAN																			129th	14	
2026	Costner Motorsports	93	Chevy				TAL; 40	GLN	TOL	MCH	POC	BER	ELK	CHI	LRP	IRP	IOW	ISF	MAD	DSF	SLM	BRI	KAN		129th	14	

^{*} Season still in progress
^{1} Ineligible for series points
