= 2007 NASCAR Busch Series =

American motorsport season

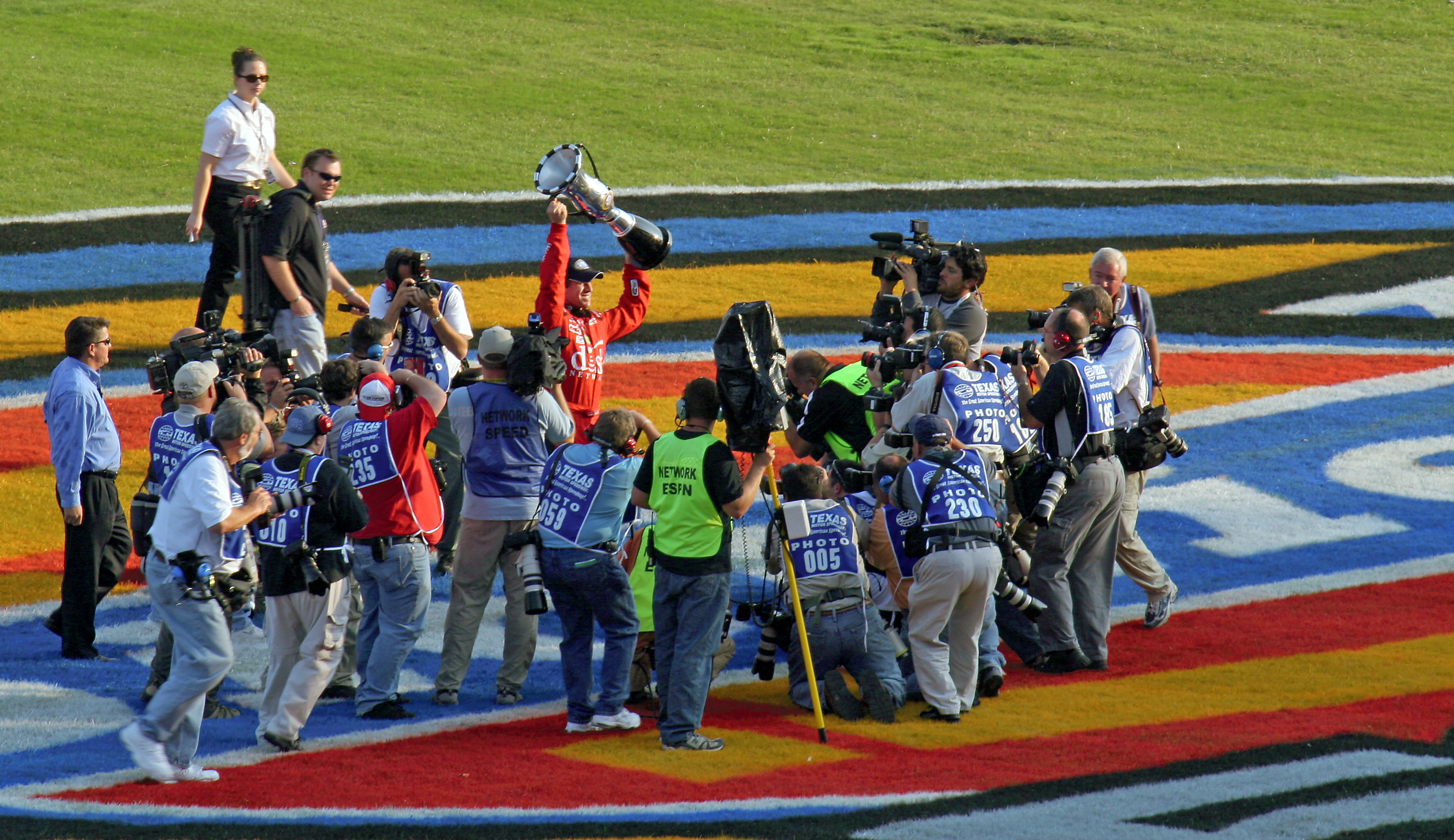
Carl Edwards celebrating his 2007 Busch Series championship.

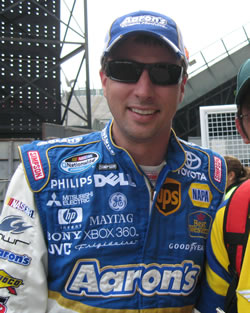
David Reutimann finished second in points.

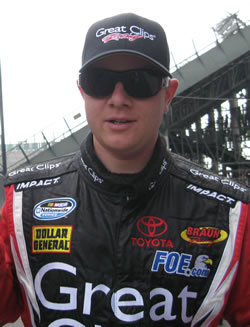
Jason Leffler, who finished third in points, was the highest-finishing series regular in the standings.

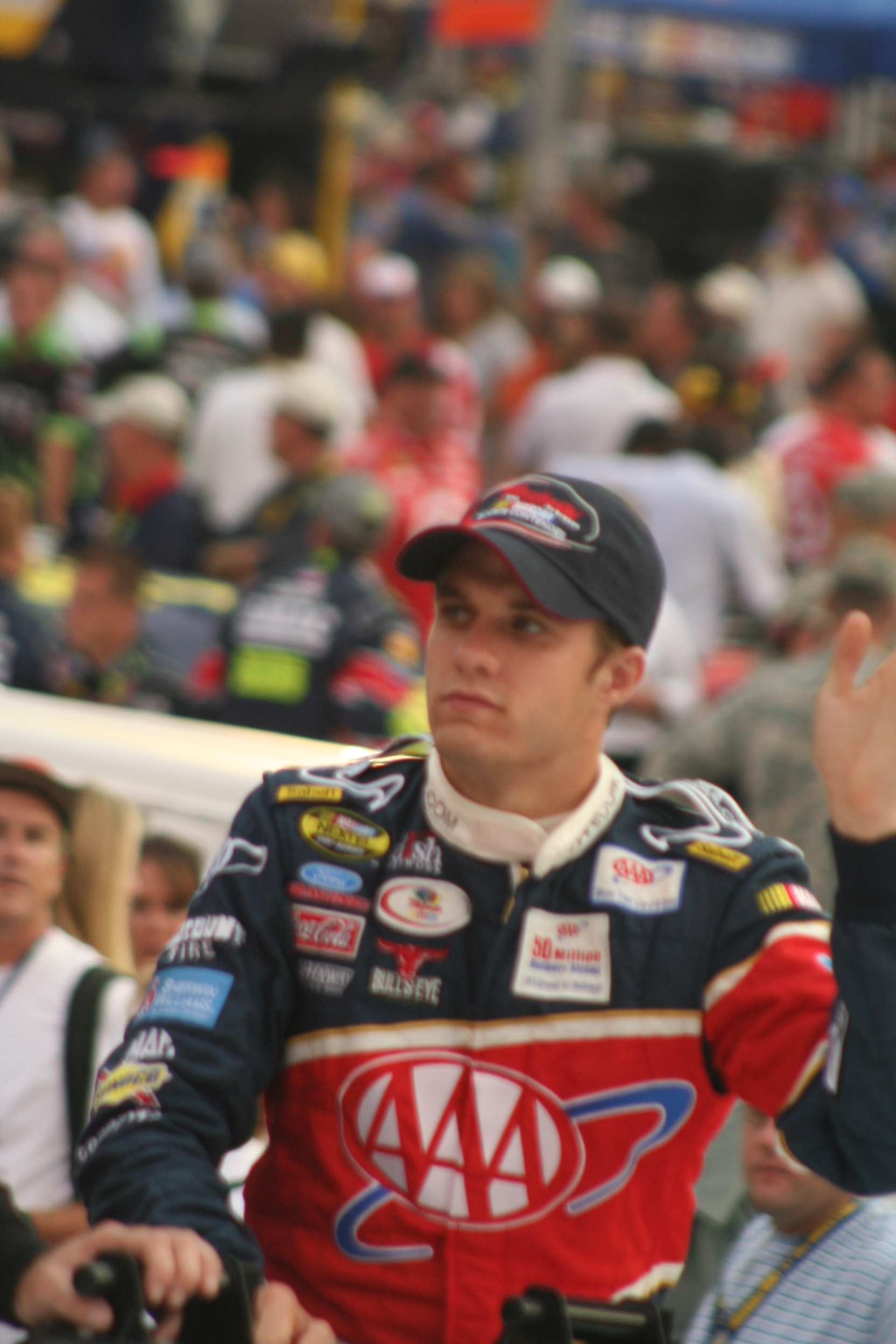
David Ragan, the 2007 Busch Series Rookie of the Year.

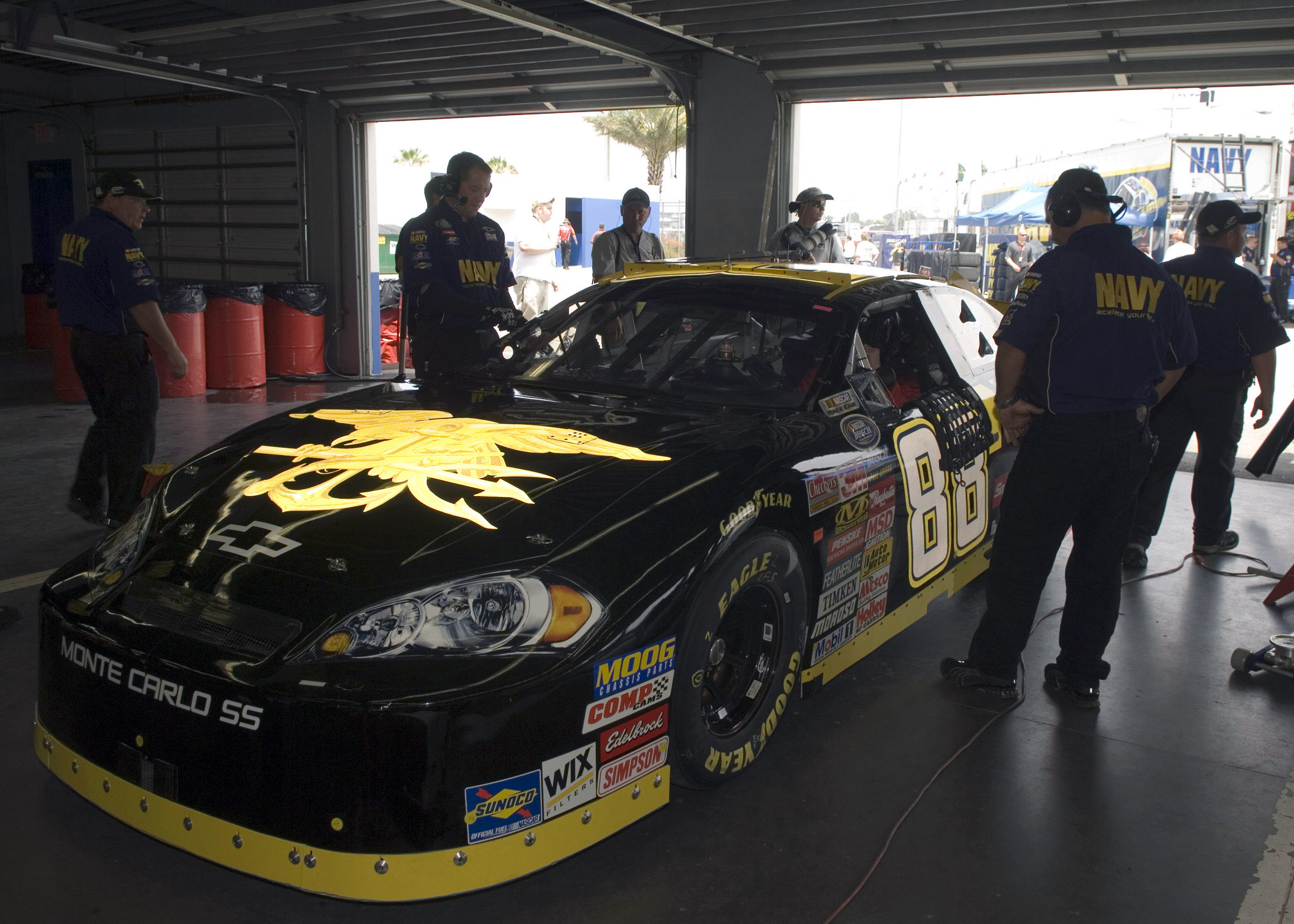
Chevy won their 5th straight manufacturer's championship.

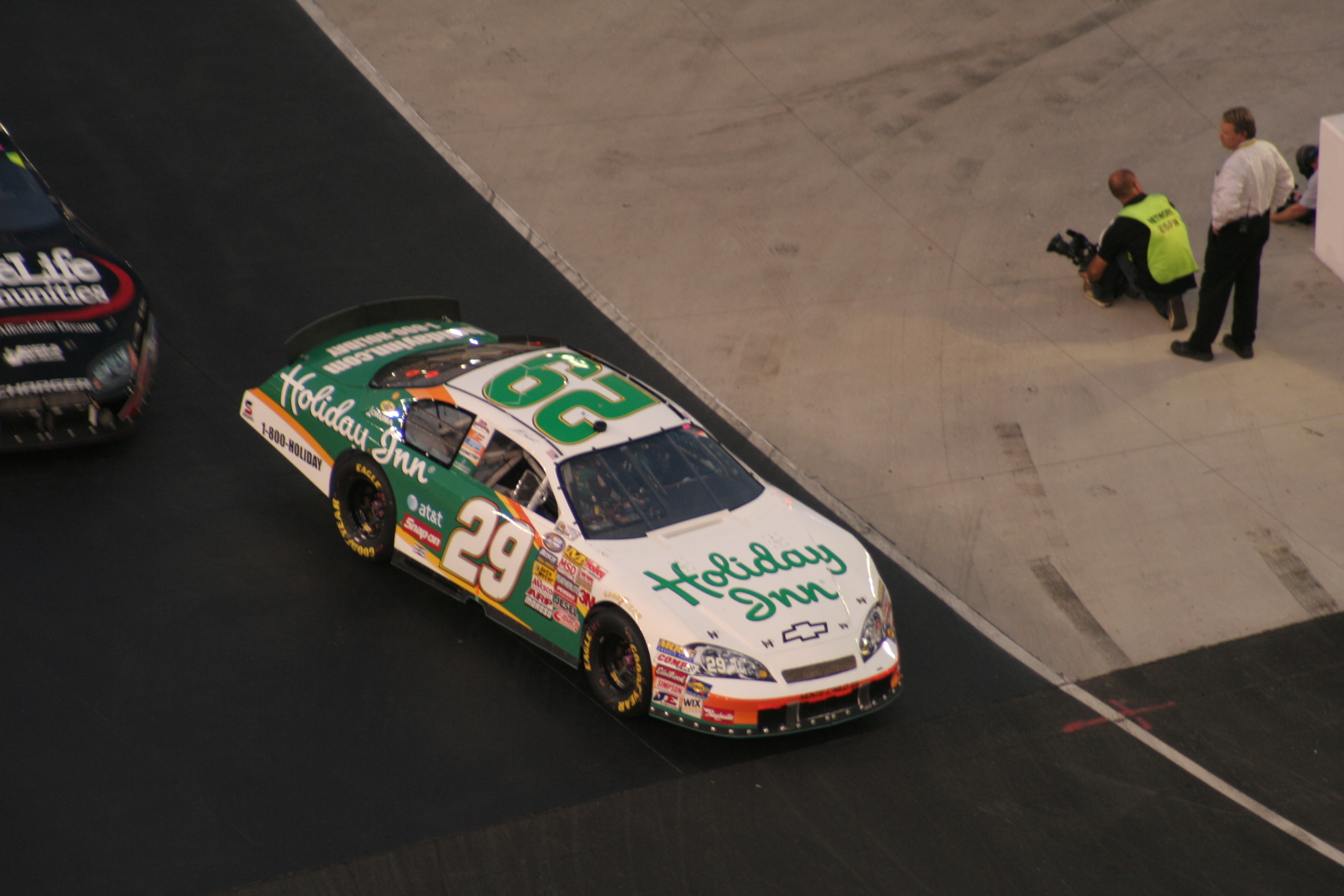
The No. 29 Richard Childress Racing Holiday Inn Chevrolet driven by Jeff Burton, and Scott Wimmer won the 2007 NASCAR Busch Series Owner's championship.

The 2007 NASCAR Busch Series was the 26th season of the NASCAR Busch Series, the second national professional stock car racing series sanctioned by NASCAR in the United States. It began on February 17 with the Orbitz 300 at Daytona International Speedway and concluded on November 17 with the Ford 300 at Homestead–Miami Speedway. Carl Edwards clinched the series championship on November 3 during the O'Reilly Challenge with 2 races remaining. The 2007 season was the final season of the series under Anheuser-Busch's sponsorship. In 2008, the Busch Series became the Nationwide Series sponsored by insurance company Nationwide Insurance with a $70 million contract for 7 years. Also, Toyota joined the series as the fourth manufacturer.

== Top stories ==
=== Buschwhackers ===
The domination of the series by "Buschwhackers" continued in 2007. In the first 28 races, only two drivers not with regular Nextel Cup Series schedules drove their cars to victory from start to finish: Stephen Leicht (Meijer 300, Kentucky Speedway) and Jason Leffler (Kroger 200, O'Reilly Raceway Park). A third, Aric Almirola, was the official winner of the AT&T 250 at the Milwaukee Mile; Almirola qualified the car for Denny Hamlin who was racing at Sonoma in the Cup Series and was not scheduled to start, but was forced to as Hamlin was delayed in returning from Sonoma. Hamlin was placed in the car after arriving and drove nearly the entire race, winning, but he failed to receive credit because he failed to start. 32 of the 35 races were won by Cup Series drivers in 2007.

Meanwhile, Carl Edwards led Kevin Harvick by 733 points in the championship standings, a reversal from 2006 when Harvick beat Edwards by a record 824 points. At one time, Edwards' lead was 871 points prior to a stretch of five consecutive races outside the top 10 in the finishing order (in three of those races he finished 23rd or worse). There were more Busch only regulars near the top of the standings, but only because the Cup drivers ran fewer cumulative races than in 2006.

=== Owner's Championship ===
The Owner's Championship went to the No. 29 car of Richard Childress Racing driven by Scott Wimmer and Jeff Burton. This is the second time in Busch Series history where the driver's and owner's points champions were different. The previous instance also involved RCR and happened in 2003. Hendrick Motorsports driver Brian Vickers won the series points title as a driver, but RCR's No. 21 car earned more total points with Johnny Sauter and Kevin Harvick sharing the ride. It would happen several more times afterwards.

=== 2008 NASCAR Nationwide Series ===
After 26 years of Anheuser-Busch sponsoring the series with their Busch Beer brand they decided not to renew their sponsorship for the 2008 season. Rumored sponsorship deals for the series included Subway, KFC, Wal-Mart, And Culvers, however, those deals fell through. On October 10, 2007, chairman Brian France announced that insurance company Nationwide had signed a seven-year $60 million deal to sponsor the series. Nationwide also replaces Allstate as the official insurance company of NASCAR.

== Schedule ==
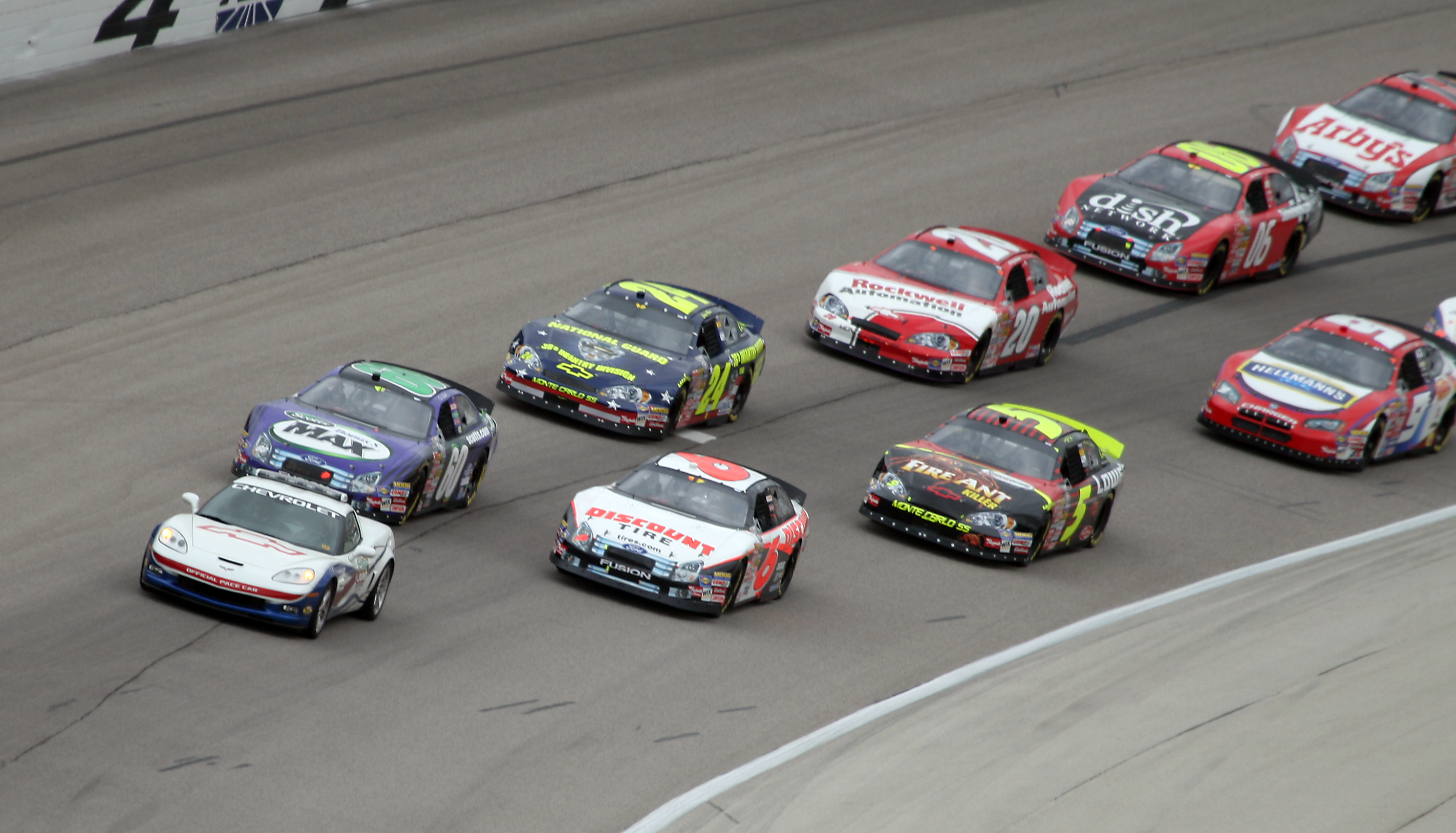
Busch cars pacing at Texas during the 2007 O'Reilly 300

The official 2007 Busch Series schedule was announced on October 2, 2006. The only major schedule change was the addition of the first NASCAR race in Canada at Circuit Gilles Villeneuve, which replaces last year's race at Martinsville. This marked the first time in Busch Series history that there are two consecutive road courses on the schedule. The order of races in July was also shuffled.

No.	Race title	Track	Location	Date
1	Orbitz 300	Daytona International Speedway	Daytona Beach, Florida	February 17
2	Stater Brothers 300	California Speedway	Fontana, California	February 24
3	Telcel-Motorola México 200	Autódromo Hermanos Rodríguez	Mexico City, Mexico	March 4
4	Sam's Town 300	Las Vegas Motor Speedway	Las Vegas, Nevada	March 10
5	Nicorette 300	Atlanta Motor Speedway	Hampton, Georgia	March 17
6	Sharpie Mini 300	Bristol Motor Speedway	Bristol, Tennessee	March 24
7	Pepsi 300	Nashville Superspeedway	Lebanon, Tennessee	April 7
8	O'Reilly 300	Texas Motor Speedway	Fort Worth, Texas	April 14
9	Bashas' Supermarkets 200	Phoenix International Raceway	Avondale, Arizona	April 20
10	Aaron's 312	Talladega Superspeedway	Lincoln, Alabama	April 28
11	Circuit City 250	Richmond International Raceway	Richmond, Virginia	May 4
12	Diamond Hill Plywood 200	Darlington Raceway	Darlington, South Carolina	May 11
13	Carquest Auto Parts 300	Lowe's Motor Speedway	Concord, North Carolina	May 26
14	Dover 200	Dover International Speedway	Dover, Delaware	June 2
15	Federated Auto Parts 300	Nashville Superspeedway	Lebanon, Tennessee	June 9
16	Meijer 300	Kentucky Speedway	Sparta, Kentucky	June 16
17	AT&T 250	Milwaukee Mile	West Allis, Wisconsin	June 23
18	Camping World 200	New Hampshire International Speedway	Loudon, New Hampshire	June 30
19	Winn-Dixie 250	Daytona International Speedway	Daytona Beach, Florida	July 6
20	USG Durock 300	Chicagoland Speedway	Joliet, Illinois	July 14
21	Gateway 250	Gateway International Raceway	Madison, Illinois	July 21
22	Kroger 200	O'Reilly Raceway Park	Brownsburg, Indiana	July 28
23	NAPA Auto Parts 200	Circuit Gilles Villeneuve	Montreal, Quebec, Canada	August 4
24	Zippo 200	Watkins Glen International	Watkins Glen, New York	August 11
25	Carfax 250	Michigan International Speedway	Cambridge Township, Michigan	August 18
26	Food City 250	Bristol Motor Speedway	Bristol, Tennessee	August 24
27	Camping World 300 presented by RVs.com	California Speedway	Fontana, California	September 1
28	Emerson Radio 250	Richmond International Raceway	Richmond, Virginia	September 7
29	RoadLoans.com 200	Dover International Speedway	Dover, Delaware	September 22
30	Yellow Transportation 300	Kansas Speedway	Kansas City, Kansas	September 29
31	Dollar General 300	Lowe's Motor Speedway	Concord, North Carolina	October 12
32	Sam's Town 250	Memphis Motorsports Park	Millington, Tennessee	October 27
33	O'Reilly Challenge	Texas Motor Speedway	Fort Worth, Texas	November 3
34	Arizona.Travel 200	Phoenix International Raceway	Avondale, Arizona	November 10
35	Ford 300	Homestead–Miami Speedway	Homestead, Florida	November 17

ESPN2 covered the majority of the Busch Series in 2007 with ESPN on ABC covering six races as part of the new television package. The primary commentators for ESPN were Jerry Punch, Rusty Wallace and Andy Petree.

== Teams and drivers ==
=== Complete schedule ===
Manufacturer	Team	No.	Driver	Crew chief
Chevrolet	D.D.L. Motorsports	0	Eric McClure 32	Steve Jenkins 17; Tyler Roach 5 Mike Tichenor 13
Chevrolet	D.D.L. Motorsports	0	J. R. Fitzpatrick 2	Steve Jenkins 17; Tyler Roach 5 Mike Tichenor 13
Chevrolet	D.D.L. Motorsports	0	Kevin Lepage 1	Steve Jenkins 17; Tyler Roach 5 Mike Tichenor 13
Chevrolet	Jay Robinson Racing	28	Robert Richardson Jr. 16	Steve Plattenberger 17; Jay Robinson 1 Wayne Carroll Jr. 11; Kenneth Campbell 6
Chevrolet	Jay Robinson Racing	28	Jeff Green 3	Steve Plattenberger 17; Jay Robinson 1 Wayne Carroll Jr. 11; Kenneth Campbell 6
Chevrolet	Jay Robinson Racing	28	Germán Quiroga 1	Steve Plattenberger 17; Jay Robinson 1 Wayne Carroll Jr. 11; Kenneth Campbell 6
Chevrolet	Jay Robinson Racing	28	Johnny Sauter 6	Steve Plattenberger 17; Jay Robinson 1 Wayne Carroll Jr. 11; Kenneth Campbell 6
Chevrolet	Jay Robinson Racing	28	Derrike Cope 5	Steve Plattenberger 17; Jay Robinson 1 Wayne Carroll Jr. 11; Kenneth Campbell 6
Chevrolet	Jay Robinson Racing	28	Niclas Jönsson 1	Steve Plattenberger 17; Jay Robinson 1 Wayne Carroll Jr. 11; Kenneth Campbell 6
Chevrolet	Jay Robinson Racing	28	Blake Bjorklund 3	Steve Plattenberger 17; Jay Robinson 1 Wayne Carroll Jr. 11; Kenneth Campbell 6
Chevrolet	Joe Gibbs Racing	18	Aric Almirola 8	Jason Ratcliff
Chevrolet	Joe Gibbs Racing	18	Tony Stewart 3	Jason Ratcliff
Chevrolet	Joe Gibbs Racing	18	Brad Coleman (R) 17	Jason Ratcliff
Chevrolet	Joe Gibbs Racing	18	Kevin Conway 7	Jason Ratcliff
Chevrolet	Joe Gibbs Racing	20	Denny Hamlin 22	Dave Rogers
Chevrolet	Joe Gibbs Racing	20	Tony Stewart 1	Dave Rogers
Chevrolet	Joe Gibbs Racing	20	Aric Almirola 10	Dave Rogers
Chevrolet	Joe Gibbs Racing	20	Travis Kittleson 1	Dave Rogers
Chevrolet	Joe Gibbs Racing	20	J. J. Yeley 1	Dave Rogers
Chevrolet	JR Motorsports	88	Shane Huffman 18	Wes Ward 31; Tony Eury Sr. 4
Chevrolet	JR Motorsports	88	Dale Earnhardt Jr. 1	Wes Ward 31; Tony Eury Sr. 4
Chevrolet	JR Motorsports	88	Brad Keselowski (R) 14	Wes Ward 31; Tony Eury Sr. 4
Chevrolet	JR Motorsports	88	Andy Pilgrim 2	Wes Ward 31; Tony Eury Sr. 4
Chevrolet	Kevin Harvick, Inc.	33	Tony Stewart 8	Dan Stillman
Chevrolet	Kevin Harvick, Inc.	33	Kevin Harvick 8	Dan Stillman
Chevrolet	Kevin Harvick, Inc.	33	Ron Fellows 3	Dan Stillman
Chevrolet	Kevin Harvick, Inc.	33	Tony Raines 9	Dan Stillman
Chevrolet	Kevin Harvick, Inc.	33	Cale Gale 7	Dan Stillman
Chevrolet	Kevin Harvick, Inc.	77	Bobby Labonte 19	Wally Rogers
Chevrolet	Kevin Harvick, Inc.	77	Kertus Davis 5	Wally Rogers
Chevrolet	Kevin Harvick, Inc.	77	Kevin Harvick 4	Wally Rogers
Chevrolet	Kevin Harvick, Inc.	77	Ron Hornaday Jr. 5	Wally Rogers
Chevrolet	Kevin Harvick, Inc.	77	Scott Wimmer 1	Wally Rogers
Chevrolet	Kevin Harvick, Inc.	77	Brandon Miller 1	Wally Rogers
Chevrolet	McGill Motorsports	36	Brent Sherman 30	Ricky Pearson
Chevrolet	McGill Motorsports	36	Jeremy Clements 5	Ricky Pearson
Chevrolet	Phoenix Racing	1	J. J. Yeley 30	Marc Reno 6 Chuck Meyers 29
Chevrolet	Phoenix Racing	1	Johnny Benson 1	Marc Reno 6 Chuck Meyers 29
Chevrolet	Phoenix Racing	1	Max Papis 2	Marc Reno 6 Chuck Meyers 29
Chevrolet	Phoenix Racing	1	Sterling Marlin 2	Marc Reno 6 Chuck Meyers 29
Chevrolet	Phoenix Racing	7	Mike Wallace	Fred Wanke 29; Gere Kennon Jr. 6
Chevrolet	Richard Childress Racing	21	Kevin Harvick 14	Shane Wilson
Chevrolet	Richard Childress Racing	21	Timothy Peters 7	Shane Wilson
Chevrolet	Richard Childress Racing	21	P. J. Jones 1	Shane Wilson
Chevrolet	Richard Childress Racing	21	Scott Wimmer 6	Shane Wilson
Chevrolet	Richard Childress Racing	21	Tim McCreadie 6	Shane Wilson
Chevrolet	Richard Childress Racing	21	Clint Bowyer 1	Shane Wilson
Chevrolet	Richard Childress Racing	29	Scott Wimmer 16	Pat Smith
Chevrolet	Richard Childress Racing	29	Jeff Burton 19	Pat Smith
Dodge	Chip Ganassi Racing	41	Reed Sorenson 18	Brian Pattie 18; Brad Parrott 17
Dodge	Chip Ganassi Racing	41	Scott Pruett 3	Brian Pattie 18; Brad Parrott 17
Dodge	Chip Ganassi Racing	41	David Stremme 5	Brian Pattie 18; Brad Parrott 17
Dodge	Chip Ganassi Racing	41	Scott Lagasse Jr. 2	Brian Pattie 18; Brad Parrott 17
Dodge	Chip Ganassi Racing	41	Bryan Clauson 5	Brian Pattie 18; Brad Parrott 17
Dodge	Chip Ganassi Racing	41	A. J. Allmendinger 2	Brian Pattie 18; Brad Parrott 17
Dodge	Chip Ganassi Racing	42	Juan Pablo Montoya 17	Brad Parrott 18; Brian Pattie 14; Eddie Buffington 3
Dodge	Chip Ganassi Racing	42	Kevin Hamlin 7	Brad Parrott 18; Brian Pattie 14; Eddie Buffington 3
Dodge	Chip Ganassi Racing	42	Michael Valiante 1	Brad Parrott 18; Brian Pattie 14; Eddie Buffington 3
Dodge	Chip Ganassi Racing	42	David Stremme 1	Brad Parrott 18; Brian Pattie 14; Eddie Buffington 3
Dodge	Chip Ganassi Racing	42	A. J. Allmendinger 5	Brad Parrott 18; Brian Pattie 14; Eddie Buffington 3
Dodge	Chip Ganassi Racing	42	Dario Franchitti 4	Brad Parrott 18; Brian Pattie 14; Eddie Buffington 3
Dodge	Fitz Racing	22	David Stremme 8	Paul Wolfe
Dodge	Fitz Racing	22	Carlos Contreras 1	Paul Wolfe
Dodge	Fitz Racing	22	Mike Bliss 22	Paul Wolfe
Dodge	Fitz Racing	22	Josh Wise 1	Paul Wolfe
Dodge	Fitz Racing	22	Patrick Carpentier 2	Paul Wolfe
Dodge	Fitz Racing	22	Robby Gordon 1	Paul Wolfe
Dodge	Gillett Evernham Motorsports	9	Kasey Kahne 18	Mike Shiplett
Dodge	Gillett Evernham Motorsports	9	Scott Riggs 4	Mike Shiplett
Dodge	Gillett Evernham Motorsports	9	Boris Said 4	Mike Shiplett
Dodge	Gillett Evernham Motorsports	9	Elliott Sadler 2	Mike Shiplett
Dodge	Gillett Evernham Motorsports	9	Chase Miller 6	Mike Shiplett
Dodge	Gillett Evernham Motorsports	9	Deac McCaskill 1	Mike Shiplett
Dodge	Rusty Wallace, Inc.	66	Steve Wallace 34	Bryant Frazier 20; Steve Darne 9 Gio Edward Liberati 2 Shane Huffman 4
Dodge	Rusty Wallace, Inc.	66	Reed Sorenson 1	Bryant Frazier 20; Steve Darne 9 Gio Edward Liberati 2 Shane Huffman 4
Ford	Brewco Motorsports 26; Baker Curb Racing 9	27	Ward Burton 16	Stewart Cooper 31; Newt Moore 3 Shawn Parker 1
Ford	Brewco Motorsports 26; Baker Curb Racing 9	27	Jorge Goeters 3	Stewart Cooper 31; Newt Moore 3 Shawn Parker 1
Ford	Brewco Motorsports 26; Baker Curb Racing 9	27	Jason Keller 6	Stewart Cooper 31; Newt Moore 3 Shawn Parker 1
Ford	Brewco Motorsports 26; Baker Curb Racing 9	27	Bobby East 3	Stewart Cooper 31; Newt Moore 3 Shawn Parker 1
Ford	Brewco Motorsports 26; Baker Curb Racing 9	27	Johnny Sauter 1	Stewart Cooper 31; Newt Moore 3 Shawn Parker 1
Ford	Brewco Motorsports 26; Baker Curb Racing 9	27	Robby Gordon 2	Stewart Cooper 31; Newt Moore 3 Shawn Parker 1
Ford	Brewco Motorsports 26; Baker Curb Racing 9	27	Casey Atwood 2	Stewart Cooper 31; Newt Moore 3 Shawn Parker 1
Ford	Brewco Motorsports 26; Baker Curb Racing 9	27	Brad Baker 2	Stewart Cooper 31; Newt Moore 3 Shawn Parker 1
Ford	Brewco Motorsports 26; Baker Curb Racing 9	37	Jamie McMurray 10	Newt Moore 31; Stewart Cooper 4
Ford	Brewco Motorsports 26; Baker Curb Racing 9	37	Greg Biffle 11	Newt Moore 31; Stewart Cooper 4
Ford	Brewco Motorsports 26; Baker Curb Racing 9	37	Johnny Sauter 1	Newt Moore 31; Stewart Cooper 4
Ford	Brewco Motorsports 26; Baker Curb Racing 9	37	Bobby East 6	Newt Moore 31; Stewart Cooper 4
Ford	Brewco Motorsports 26; Baker Curb Racing 9	37	John Graham 4	Newt Moore 31; Stewart Cooper 4
Ford	Brewco Motorsports 26; Baker Curb Racing 9	37	Casey Atwood 2	Newt Moore 31; Stewart Cooper 4
Ford	Brewco Motorsports 26; Baker Curb Racing 9	37	Brad Baker 1	Newt Moore 31; Stewart Cooper 4
Ford	Carl A. Haas Motorsports	14	Kyle Krisiloff (R)	Todd Gordon 6 Travis Carter 23; Bryant Frazier 6
Ford	Robert Yates Racing	90	Stephen Leicht	Cully Barraclough
Ford	Roush Racing	6	David Ragan (R)	Mike Kelley
Ford	Roush Racing	16	Todd Kluever 14	Eddie Pardue
Ford	Roush Racing	16	Greg Biffle 19	Eddie Pardue
Ford	Roush Racing	16	Travis Kvapil 1	Eddie Pardue
Ford	Roush Racing	16	Colin Braun 1	Eddie Pardue
Ford	Roush Racing	60	Carl Edwards	Pierre Kuettel
Ford	Team Rensi Motorsports	25	David Gilliland 19	Todd Brewer
Ford	Team Rensi Motorsports	25	Kenny Wallace 1	Todd Brewer
Ford	Team Rensi Motorsports	25	Richard Johns 15	Todd Brewer
Ford	Team Rensi Motorsports	35	Bobby Hamilton Jr.	Chris Wright
Ford	Wood Brothers/JTG Racing	47	Jon Wood 13	Scott Zipadelli
Ford	Wood Brothers/JTG Racing	47	Travis Kvapil 1	Scott Zipadelli
Ford	Wood Brothers/JTG Racing	47	Kelly Bires 19	Scott Zipadelli
Ford	Wood Brothers/JTG Racing	47	Andy Lally 2	Scott Zipadelli
Ford	Wood Brothers/JTG Racing	59	Marcos Ambrose (R)	Greg Conner 21; Ernie Cope 14
Toyota	Braun Racing	10	John Andretti 1	Trent Owens
Toyota	Braun Racing	10	Dave Blaney 22	Trent Owens
Toyota	Braun Racing	10	Todd Bodine 1	Trent Owens
Toyota	Braun Racing	10	Mike Bliss 1	Trent Owens
Toyota	Braun Racing	10	John Graham 2	Trent Owens
Toyota	Braun Racing	10	Brian Vickers 6	Trent Owens
Toyota	Braun Racing	10	Brent Sherman 2	Trent Owens
Toyota	Braun Racing	38	Jason Leffler	Todd Lohse
Toyota	Michael Waltrip Racing	99	David Reutimann	Jerry Baxter

=== Part-time schedule ===
Manufacturer	Team	No.	Driver	Crew chief	Rounds
Chevrolet	Brian Carter Racing	61	Josh Krug	Brian Carter	1
Chevrolet	Brian Carter Racing	61	Travis Kittleson	Brian Carter	1
Chevrolet	CJM Racing	12	Marc Mitchell	Matthew Gimbel	1
Chevrolet	CJM Racing	11	Marc Mitchell	Todd Gordon	1
Chevrolet	CJM Racing	11	Jason Keller	Todd Gordon	15
Chevrolet	Dale Earnhardt, Inc.	11	Martin Truex Jr.	Kevin Manion	2
Chevrolet	Dale Earnhardt, Inc.	8	Martin Truex Jr.	Kevin Manion	1
Chevrolet	Dale Earnhardt, Inc.	8	Dale Earnhardt Jr.	Tony Eury Jr.	4
Chevrolet	Dale Earnhardt, Inc.	15	Paul Menard	Mike Greci	11
Chevrolet	D.D.L. Motorsports	00	Mike Potter	Michael Walters	2
Chevrolet	D.D.L. Motorsports	01	Morgan Shepherd	William Technier 8 Mike Tichenor 7 Michael Walters 10	5
Chevrolet	D.D.L. Motorsports	01	Kevin Lepage	William Technier 8 Mike Tichenor 7 Michael Walters 10	2
Chevrolet	D.D.L. Motorsports	01	Shelby Howard	William Technier 8 Mike Tichenor 7 Michael Walters 10	2
Chevrolet	D.D.L. Motorsports	01	Danny Efland	William Technier 8 Mike Tichenor 7 Michael Walters 10	4
Chevrolet	D.D.L. Motorsports	01	Joe Fox	William Technier 8 Mike Tichenor 7 Michael Walters 10	2
Chevrolet	D.D.L. Motorsports	01	Kertus Davis	William Technier 8 Mike Tichenor 7 Michael Walters 10	9
Chevrolet	Frank Cicci Racing	34	Steve Grissom	James Daly	1
Chevrolet	Frank Cicci Racing	34	Jay Sauter	James Daly	5
Chevrolet	Frank Cicci Racing	34	Brian Simo	James Daly	1
Chevrolet	Ginn Racing	4	Regan Smith	Doug Randolph	17
Chevrolet	Henderson Motorsports	75	Caleb Holman	Darrell Holman	1
Chevrolet	Hendrick Motorsports	5	Kyle Busch	Mike Bumgarner	19
Chevrolet	Hendrick Motorsports	5	Adrián Fernández	Mike Bumgarner	1
Chevrolet	Hendrick Motorsports	5	Mark Martin	Mike Bumgarner	3
Chevrolet	Hendrick Motorsports	5	Casey Mears	Mike Bumgarner	1
Chevrolet	Hendrick Motorsports	5	Landon Cassill	Mike Bumgarner	2
Chevrolet	Hendrick Motorsports	24	Casey Mears	Chad Walter	19
Chevrolet	Hendrick Motorsports	24	Landon Cassill	Chad Walter	4
Chevrolet	Hendrick Motorsports	48	Jimmie Johnson	Chad Knaus 1 Chad Walter 2	3
Chevrolet	Horn Automotive	58	Chris Horn	Fred Horn	4
Chevrolet	Jay Robinson Racing	49	Derrike Cope	Randy Huffman 1 Mark Fordham 3	4
Chevrolet	Jeff Spraker Racing	63	Kerry Earnhardt	Jeff Spraker	1
Chevrolet	Jeff Spraker Racing	63	Mike MacKenzie	Jeff Spraker	1
Chevrolet	Keith Coleman Racing	23	Brad Keselowski (R)	Ronnie Griffin	14
Chevrolet	MacDonald Motorsports	71	Randy MacDonald	James Daly	1
Chevrolet	MacDonald Motorsports	71	Trevor Boys	James Daly	2
Chevrolet	MacDonald Motorsports	71	Eddie MacDonald	James Daly	1
Chevrolet	RB1 Motorsports	71	Ron Young	Greg Tester	4
Chevrolet	Mac Hill Motorsports	56	Danny O'Quinn Jr.	Tony Lambert	6
Chevrolet	Mac Hill Motorsports	56	Dange Hanniford	Tony Lambert	1
Chevrolet	Mac Hill Motorsports	56	A. J. Frank	Tony Lambert	1
Chevrolet	Mac Hill Motorsports	56	Frank Kreyer	Tony Lambert	4
Chevrolet	Mac Hill Motorsports	56	Larry Foyt	Tony Lambert	1
Chevrolet	Mike Harmon Racing	44	Mike Harmon	Steve Kuykendall 9 Donnie Richardson 4 Mike Harmon 1	8
Chevrolet	Mike Harmon Racing	44	Johnny Borneman III	Steve Kuykendall 9 Donnie Richardson 4 Mike Harmon 1	1
Chevrolet	Mike Harmon Racing	44	Jennifer Jo Cobb	Steve Kuykendall 9 Donnie Richardson 4 Mike Harmon 1	3
Chevrolet	Mike Harmon Racing	48	Mike Harmon	Steve Kuykendall 9 Donnie Richardson 4 Mike Harmon 1	2
Chevrolet	ML Motorsports	70	Justin Diercks	Tom Sokoloski	8
Chevrolet	ML Motorsports	70	Mark Green	Tom Sokoloski	10
Chevrolet	Premier Motorsport	85	Brett Rowe	Dan Kinney	1
Chevrolet	NEMCO Motorsports	87	Joe Nemechek	Mike Boerschinger	3
Chevrolet	Richard Childress Racing	2	Clint Bowyer	Dan Deeringhoff	21
Chevrolet	Richard Childress Racing	2	Kenny Wallace	Dan Deeringhoff	1
Chevrolet	Richardson Racing	80	Robert Richardson Jr.	Jay Robinson	1 (Note: Entry was fielded in a collaboration with Jay Robinson Racing.)
Chevrolet	SKI Motorsports	30	Stanton Barrett	Mike Dayton	16
Chevrolet	SKI Motorsports	30	Danny O'Quinn Jr.	Mike Dayton	1
Chevrolet	SKI Motorsports	31	Jeff Fuller	Doug Hodge	1
Chevrolet	Team Johnson Racing	76	Jerick Johnson	Gene Allnut	6
Chevrolet	Central Coast Racing	13	Todd Souza	Michael Muñoz	2
Chevrolet	Transnet Racing	98	Alex García	Jason Roche	4
Dodge	Fitz Racing	44	Rubén Pardo	Randy Nelson; Jerry Kelly	2
Dodge	Fitz Racing	44	Mike Bliss	Randy Nelson; Jerry Kelly	1
Dodge	Fitz Racing	44	Carlos Contreras	Randy Nelson; Jerry Kelly	1
Dodge	Fitz Racing	44	Mark Green	Randy Nelson; Jerry Kelly	1
Dodge	Gillett Evernham Motorsports	19	Patrick Carpentier	Kevin Kidd	1
Dodge	Whitney Motorsports	19	Brian Keselowski	Bob Keselowski	1
Dodge	Whitney Motorsports	49	Brian Keselowski	Bob Keselowski	3
Dodge	MacDonald Motorsports	72	D. J. Kennington	Robbie Wethington 11; James Daly 6	14
Dodge	MacDonald Motorsports	72	Kevin Lepage	Robbie Wethington 11; James Daly 6	1
Dodge	MacDonald Motorsports	72	Randy MacDonald	Robbie Wethington 11; James Daly 6	1
Dodge	MacDonald Motorsports	72	Marc Mitchell	Robbie Wethington 11; James Daly 6	1
Dodge	Pennington Motorsports	08	Jason White	Barry Dodson	2
Dodge	Penske Racing	12	Sam Hornish Jr.	Matthew Gimbel	9
Dodge	Penske Racing	12	Kurt Busch	Matthew Gimbel	3
Dodge	Penske Racing	12	Ryan Newman	Matthew Gimbel	8
Dodge	Penske Racing	39	Kurt Busch	Troy Raker	1
Dodge	Rusty Wallace, Inc.	64	Chase Austin	Steve Darne	1
Dodge	Sadler Brothers Racing	95	Blake Feese	Joey Jones	1
Dodge	Tom Eriksen Racing	67	Rogelio López	Tom Eriksen	1
Dodge	Tom Eriksen Racing	68	Antonio Pérez	Troy Williams	1
Ford	AFR Motorsports	34	Brian Pannone	Bob Farmer	1
Ford	AFR Motorsports	50	Brian Pannone	Jeff Barrister	1
Ford	Brewco Motorsports	43	Bobby East	Newt Moore	1
Ford	John Young Racing	46	John Young	Ed Ash	1
Ford	Means Racing	52	Brad Teague	Jimmy Means	7
Ford	Means Racing	52	Kevin Lepage	Jimmy Means	5
Ford	Means Racing	52	Donnie Neuenberger	Jimmy Means	4
Ford	Means Racing	52	Jamie Mosley	Jimmy Means	1
Ford	Means Racing	52	Ian Henderson	Jimmy Means	2
Ford	Means Racing	52	Scott Gaylord	Jimmy Means	2
Ford	Means Racing	52	Chris Lawson	Jimmy Means	1
Ford	Robby Gordon Motorsports	55	Robby Gordon	Eddie Buffington 7 Dana Brugman 1	8
Ford	Roush Racing	06	Mark Martin	Chad Norris	2
Ford	Roush Racing	17	Matt Kenseth	Drew Blickensderfer	24
Ford	Roush Racing	17	Michel Jourdain Jr.	Drew Blickensderfer	2
Ford	Roush Racing	17	Danny O'Quinn Jr.	Drew Blickensderfer	2
Ford	Roush Racing	26	Greg Biffle	Pat Tryson	1
Ford	Roush Racing	26	Jamie McMurray	Chad Norris	12
Ford	Roush Racing	26	Todd Kluever	Chad Norris	2
Ford	Roush Racing	26	Danny O'Quinn Jr.	Chad Norris	1
Ford	Specialty Racing	40	Matt Carter	Doug Taylor	1
Toyota	Braun Racing	32	Dave Blaney	???	2
Toyota	Braun Racing	32	Michael Waltrip	???	1
Toyota	Braun Racing	32	Bill Elliott	???	1
Toyota	Braun Racing	32	Brian Vickers	???	1
Toyota	Germain Racing	03	Todd Bodine	Doug Chouinard	5
Toyota	Michael Waltrip Racing	00	Michael McDowell	Randy Goss 3 Butch Hylton 1	3
Toyota	Michael Waltrip Racing	44	Dale Jarrett	Randy Goss 3 Butch Hylton 1	1
Toyota	Riley-D'Hondt Motorsports	91	Bobby Santos III	Gene Nead 2 Jerry Pitts 3	2
Toyota	Riley-D'Hondt Motorsports	91	David Green	Gene Nead 2 Jerry Pitts 3	3
Toyota	Riley-D'Hondt Motorsports	92	Bobby Santos III	Lance Dieters	2
Chevrolet Ford	Day Enterprise Racing	05	Brett Rowe	Tom Perkins	6
Chevrolet Ford	Day Enterprise Racing	05	Justin Ashburn	Tom Perkins	4
Chevrolet Ford	Day Enterprise Racing	05	Brad Teague	Tom Perkins	1
Chevrolet Dodge	Fridel-Carter Motorsports	54	Brad Teague	Robert Larkins	1
Chevrolet Dodge	Fridel-Carter Motorsports	54	Carl Long	Jon Sykes 2 Dom Turse 1	3
Chevrolet Ford	Revelocity Racing	73	Brett Rowe	Tom Perkins	3
Dodge Ford	Faith Motorsports	89	Morgan Shepherd	Walter Tollett 15; James Graham 6	20
Dodge Ford	Faith Motorsports	89	Brad Teague	Walter Tollett 15; James Graham 6	1 (Note: Entry was fielded in a collaboration with Means Racing.)

== Races ==
=== Orbitz 300 ===
The Orbitz 300 was held February 16 at Daytona International Speedway. Aric Almirola won the pole. Kevin Harvick won a relatively quick race from the 31st starting position. There were two early cautions: the first one on lap 4 for a three-car incident and the second one for "the Big One" on lap 16 involving 12 cars. The race was clean afterward. This was the first race televised on ESPN2 as part of the 2007 television package that lasted until 2014.

Top ten results:

Pos.	No.	Driver	Make	Team
1	21	Kevin Harvick	Chevrolet	Richard Childress Racing
2	32	Dave Blaney	Toyota	Braun Racing
3	60	Carl Edwards	Ford	Roush Fenway Racing
4	2	Clint Bowyer	Chevrolet	Richard Childress Racing
5	06	Mark Martin	Ford	Roush Fenway Racing
6	11	Martin Truex Jr.	Chevrolet	Dale Earnhardt, Inc.
7	8	Dale Earnhardt Jr.	Chevrolet	Dale Earnhardt, Inc.
8	33	Tony Stewart	Chevrolet	Kevin Harvick, Inc.
9	20	Denny Hamlin	Chevrolet	Joe Gibbs Racing
10	26	Greg Biffle	Ford	Roush Fenway Racing

Did not qualify: Casey Mears (#24), David Stremme (#22), Justin Diercks (#70), J. J. Yeley (#1), Brad Keselowski (#23), Brad Teague (#52)

=== Stater Brothers 300 ===
The Stater Brothers 300 was held February 24 at California Speedway. Dave Blaney won the pole, the first pole for Toyota in the Busch Series. The race had a short field of only 41 cars.

Top ten results:

Pos.	No.	Driver	Make	Team
1	17	Matt Kenseth	Ford	Roush Fenway Racing
2	24	Casey Mears	Chevrolet	Hendrick Motorsports
3	5	Kyle Busch	Chevrolet	Hendrick Motorsports
4	60	Carl Edwards	Ford	Roush Fenway Racing
5	16	Greg Biffle	Ford	Roush Fenway Racing
6	33	Kevin Harvick	Chevrolet	Kevin Harvick, Inc.
7	29	Jeff Burton	Chevrolet	Richard Childress Racing
8	20	Denny Hamlin	Chevrolet	Joe Gibbs Racing
9	4	Regan Smith	Chevrolet	Ginn Racing
10	10	Dave Blaney	Toyota	Braun Racing

Did not qualify: None.

=== Telcel-Motorola México 200 ===
The Telcel-Motorola México 200 was held March 4 at Autódromo Hermanos Rodríguez. The race was broadcast on ESPN2 in English and en español on ESPN Deportes. Scott Pruett won the pole. Juan Pablo Montoya made contact with his leading teammate Scott Pruett on a restart after coming back from a fuel-filler problem, spinning Pruett and going on to win the race, becoming the first non-American to win a NASCAR race since Ron Fellows in 2001.

Top ten results:

Pos.	No.	Driver	Make	Team
1	42	Juan Pablo Montoya (R)	Dodge	Chip Ganassi Racing
2	20	Denny Hamlin	Chevrolet	Joe Gibbs Racing
3	9	Boris Said	Dodge	Evernham Motorsports
4	60	Carl Edwards	Ford	Roush Fenway Racing
5	41	Scott Pruett	Dodge	Chip Ganassi Racing
6	38	Jason Leffler	Toyota	Braun Racing
7	27	Jorge Goeters	Ford	Brewco Motorsports
8	59	Marcos Ambrose (R)	Ford	Wood Brothers/JTG Racing
9	5	Adrián Fernández	Chevrolet	Hendrick Motorsports
10	47	Jon Wood	Ford	Wood Brothers/JTG Racing

Did not qualify: None

=== Sam's Town 300 ===
The Sam's Town 300 was held March 10 at Las Vegas Motor Speedway. Kevin Harvick won the pole. In a challenging race that was held on a newly banked racetrack, many teams, especially cup teams with drivers racing on Sunday, tried to find a setup that would work with their cars. Grip and aerodynamics became major issues as the race set a record for number of caution flags with 12 for 58 laps. This included a red flag with 10 laps to go for a hard crash into the wall by Reed Sorenson. Las Vegas natives, Kyle and Kurt Busch dominated the race, leading 123 of 200 laps, with 81 and 42 led respectively. However, Jeff Burton had been consistently quicker than the younger Busch and had taken the lead for 31 laps. Coming to the checkers, two-time Las Vegas winner Jeff Burton took his No. 29 Holiday Inn Chevy to the outside and banged fenders with Kyle who got loose under Burton and spun down on the apron and hit the outside wall after taking the second position. Out of respect for Busch leaving him room to pass, Jeff Burton pulled alongside Kyle's wrecked car to shake hands with him before going to victory lane and receive his checkered flag. This was the first NASCAR race broadcast on ABC since the 2000 Brickyard 400 seven years earlier.

Top ten results:

Pos.	No.	Driver	Make	Team
1	29	Jeff Burton	Chevrolet	Richard Childress Racing
2	5	Kyle Busch	Chevrolet	Hendrick Motorsports
3	33	Tony Stewart	Chevrolet	Kevin Harvick, Inc.
4	12	Kurt Busch	Dodge	Penske Racing South
5	22	David Stremme	Dodge	Fitz Motorsports
6	60	Carl Edwards	Ford	Roush Fenway Racing
7	21	Kevin Harvick	Chevrolet	Richard Childress Racing
8	77	Bobby Labonte	Chevrolet	Kevin Harvick, Inc.
9	88	Shane Huffman	Chevrolet	JR Motorsports
10	59	Marcos Ambrose (R)	Ford	Wood Brothers/JTG Racing

Did not qualify: None.

Note: No. 52-Kevin Lepage withdrew from the race prior to qualifying.

=== Nicorette 300 ===
The Nicorette 300 was held March 17 at Atlanta Motor Speedway. Kyle Busch won the pole. From the drop of the green flag, it appeared as though Kyle Busch would walk away with an easy victory. He proved his dominance by leading 143 of 195 laps. However, a loose lugnut after the final pit stop forced Busch to go to the tail end of the longest line, handing the lead to Jeff Burton. Burton would hold off RCR teammate Kevin Harvick for the win while Kyle Busch rallied to third after his penalty.

Top ten results:

Pos.	No.	Driver	Car	Team
1	29	Jeff Burton	Chevrolet	Richard Childress Racing
2	21	Kevin Harvick	Chevrolet	Richard Childress Racing
3	5	Kyle Busch	Chevrolet	Hendrick Motorsports
4	60	Carl Edwards	Ford	Roush Fenway Racing
5	24	Casey Mears	Chevrolet	Hendrick Motorsports
6	2	Clint Bowyer	Chevrolet	Richard Childress Racing
7	9	Kasey Kahne	Dodge	Evernham Motorsports
8	42	Juan Pablo Montoya (R)	Dodge	Chip Ganassi Racing
9	17	Matt Kenseth	Ford	Roush Fenway Racing
10	20	Tony Stewart	Chevrolet	Joe Gibbs Racing

Did not qualify: Jay Sauter (#34)

=== Sharpie Mini 300 ===
The Sharpie Mini 300 was held March 24 at Bristol Motor Speedway. Steve Wallace won his first career pole. This would be the last Busch Series race before Bristol would be repaved with new concrete and progressive banking. For the second consecutive week, Kyle Busch again proved he had the car to beat. He and series points leader Carl Edwards proved they had the cars to beat. The biggest controversy of the race came after a crash at lap 182 by David Reutimann. At the point of the crash, some of the leaders elected to come down pit road for tires and some gas on lap 188. Although the electronic light was green, signaling that pit road was open, the flagman near the light was still waving the pit road closed flag. The pit crews of Ryan Newman, Carl Edwards, and Dale Earnhardt Jr. argued with NASCAR officials about the call. Eventually, NASCAR controversially decided to let all of the cars pit and maintain their position in the field. After the confusion was sorted out, Busch took off with Edwards in pursuit. However, Mike Wallace, running on the tail end of the lead lap (Mike was in front of the leader), jumbled up the 9th restart. Mike's mistake forced Edwards into the rear bumper of Kyle Busch. Edwards would inherit the lead and would hold off teammate Matt Kenseth for his first win since Gateway in 2006.

Top ten results:

Pos.	No.	Driver	Make	Team
1	60	Carl Edwards	Ford	Roush Fenway Racing
2	17	Matt Kenseth	Ford	Roush Fenway Racing
3	5	Kyle Busch	Chevrolet	Hendrick Motorsports
4	12	Ryan Newman	Dodge	Penske Racing
5	2	Clint Bowyer	Chevrolet	Richard Childress Racing
6	8	Dale Earnhardt Jr.	Chevrolet	Dale Earnhardt, Inc.
7	37	Greg Biffle	Ford	Brewco Motorsports
8	33	Kevin Harvick	Chevrolet	Kevin Harvick, Inc.
9	29	Scott Wimmer	Chevrolet	Richard Childress Racing
10	22	Mike Bliss	Dodge	Fitz Motorsports

Did not qualify: None only 43 entries.

=== Pepsi 300 ===
The Pepsi 300 was held April 7 at Nashville Superspeedway. David Stremme won the pole. From the drop of the green flag, it appeared as though new manufacturer Toyota would steal the show and walk off with its first Busch Series win. However, Carl Edwards spoiled the party, coming back from a loose wheel penalty to pass Busch regular Jason Leffler with 25 laps to go to win his second consecutive race and extend his points lead.

Top ten results:

Pos.	No.	Driver	Make	Team
1	60	Carl Edwards	Ford	Roush Fenway Racing
2	99	David Reutimann	Toyota	Michael Waltrip Racing
3	10	Dave Blaney	Toyota	Braun Racing
4	38	Jason Leffler	Toyota	Braun Racing
5	4	Regan Smith	Chevrolet	Ginn Racing
6	88	Shane Huffman	Chevrolet	JR Motorsports
7	29	Scott Wimmer	Chevrolet	Richard Childress Racing
8	90	Stephen Leicht	Ford	Robert Yates Racing
9	35	Bobby Hamilton Jr.	Ford	Team Rensi Motorsports
10	22	Mike Bliss	Dodge	Fitz Motorsports

Did not qualify: None only 43 entries.

=== O'Reilly 300 ===
The O'Reilly 300 was held April 14 at Texas Motor Speedway. David Ragan won his first career Busch Pole Award. The race, for the third time of the season, was dominated again by Kyle Busch, who hoped to turn his strong runs into a win. However, that day would not come as an unlucky caution during a green flag pit stop would again cost Kyle the victory. Former Formula 1 driver Juan Pablo Montoya appeared to have his second Busch Series win in the bag until he hit the clutch during a pit stop, leaving him with a loose lugnut. Juan would tangle with fellow rookie Marcos Ambrose and finish 30th. Denny Hamlin would hold the lead until Matt Kenseth, who had recovered from an early spin, took the lead with 11 laps left and would go on to win in Texas.

Top ten results:

Pos.	No.	Driver	Make	Team
1	17	Matt Kenseth	Ford	Roush Fenway Racing
2	20	Denny Hamlin	Chevrolet	Joe Gibbs Racing
3	60	Carl Edwards	Ford	Roush Fenway Racing
4	24	Casey Mears	Chevrolet	Hendrick Motorsports
5	6	David Ragan	Ford	Roush Fenway Racing
6	99	David Reutimann	Toyota	Michael Waltrip Racing
7	5	Kyle Busch	Chevrolet	Hendrick Motorsports
8	12	Kurt Busch	Dodge	Penske Racing
9	15	Paul Menard	Chevrolet	Dale Earnhardt, Inc.
10	29	Jeff Burton	Chevrolet	Richard Childress Racing

Did not qualify: Robert Richardson Jr. (#80)

=== Bashas' Supermarkets 200 ===
The Bashas' Supermarkets 200 was held April 20 at Phoenix International Raceway. Kyle Busch won the pole. The early portion of the race was dominated again by Busch. However, lady luck would, for the fourth time this season, deal Busch a bad hand. While running fifth after a restart, Busch attempted to pass Ryan Newman and thought he had cleared him. However, Busch came back down on Ryan's front bumper and they both ended up crashing. Running a partial schedule, Clint Bowyer would dominate the race, leading 120 of the 200 laps. His only contender seemed to be Matt Kenseth, who had previously passed Bowyer with 33 to go but Bowyer passed him back with 14 to go and held on to win his first race since Dover last fall.

Top ten results:

Pos.	No.	Driver	Make	Team
1	2	Clint Bowyer	Chevrolet	Richard Childress Racing
2	17	Matt Kenseth	Ford	Roush Fenway Racing
3	29	Jeff Burton	Chevrolet	Richard Childress Racing
4	20	Denny Hamlin	Chevrolet	Joe Gibbs Racing
5	60	Carl Edwards	Ford	Roush Fenway Racing
6	37	Greg Biffle	Ford	Brewco Motorsports
7	24	Casey Mears	Chevrolet	Hendrick Motorsports
8	4	Regan Smith	Chevrolet	Ginn Racing
9	77	Kevin Harvick	Chevrolet	Kevin Harvick, Inc.
10	10	Dave Blaney	Toyota	Braun Racing

Did not qualify: Brian Pannone (#50)

=== Aaron's 312 ===
The Aaron's 312 was held on April 28 at Talladega Superspeedway. The race is tagged as 312 miles (502 km) to pay homage to the title sponsor, Aaron's custom of letting customers rent an item for 12 months. Brad Coleman captured his first NASCAR pole. The race itself was an exciting one to watch. Dale Earnhardt Jr. was the dominant car of the day until his transmission broke on a lap 95 restart. Kyle Busch's streak of bad luck would continue as on lap 26, Tony Stewart made contact with Kyle Busch's left rear fender sending Kyle into the wall on the backstretch. Busch took a wild ride as the car slid across the track into the grass and flipped several times. From there, many cars, including surprises Kyle Krisiloff, and Juan Pablo Montoya were in contention for the win. But Tony Stewart, who was aiming to avenge his spectacular flip from one year ago, took the lead from Casey Mears with help from Kevin Harvick, Inc. teammate Bobby Labonte. However, Labonte pulled aside Stewart coming to the checkered flag in the trial to win his first Busch Series race since 1998.

Top ten results:

Pos.	No.	Driver	Make	Team
1	77	Bobby Labonte	Chevrolet	Kevin Harvick, Inc.
2	33	Tony Stewart	Chevrolet	Kevin Harvick, Inc.
3	24	Casey Mears	Chevrolet	Hendrick Motorsports
4	6	David Ragan	Ford	Roush Fenway Racing
5	14	Kyle Krisiloff	Ford	Carl A. Haas Motorsports
6	21	Kevin Harvick	Chevrolet	Richard Childress Racing
7	42	Juan Pablo Montoya	Dodge	Chip Ganassi Racing
8	27	Ward Burton	Ford	Brewco Motorsports
9	18	Brad Coleman	Chevrolet	Joe Gibbs Racing
10	60	Carl Edwards	Ford	Roush Fenway Racing

Did not qualify: None only 42 entries.

=== Circuit City 250 ===
The Circuit City 250 presented by Funai was held on May 4 at Richmond International Raceway. Denny Hamlin won the pole. In the Busch Series' first Friday night shootout of the season, Kevin Harvick aimed to make it a four-peat of consecutive wins at RIR. From the outset, pole-sitter Denny Hamlin dominated but was taken out early by Matt Kenseth. From there, Kenseth, Jeff Burton, and Clint Bowyer established themselves as the frontrunners. Matt Kenseth looked to have the race locked up until J. J. Yeley spun on lap 222 and cut Kenseth's 2-second lead. During the final pit stop of the night, Kenseth had a mishap with the jack and came out behind Bowyer and Burton. On the last restart of the night, Bowyer pulled away from Kenseth and Buron to snap Harvick's win streak but give owner Richard Childress his fourth consecutive victory at RIR.

Top ten results:

Pos	No.	Driver	Make	Team
1	2	Clint Bowyer	Chevrolet	Richard Childress Racing
2	17	Matt Kenseth	Ford	Roush Fenway Racing
3	29	Jeff Burton	Chevrolet	Richard Childress Racing
4	77	Kevin Harvick	Chevrolet	Kevin Harvick, Inc.
5	5	Kyle Busch	Chevrolet	Hendrick Motorsports
6	16	Greg Biffle	Ford	Roush Fenway Racing
7	24	Casey Mears	Chevrolet	Hendrick Motorsports
8	41	Reed Sorenson	Dodge	Chip Ganassi Racing
9	99	David Reutimann	Toyota	Michael Waltrip Racing
10	21	Scott Wimmer	Chevrolet	Richard Childress Racing

Did not qualify: Eric McClure (#0)

=== Diamond Hill Plywood 200 ===
The Diamond Hill Plywood 200 was held May 11 at Darlington Raceway. Denny Hamlin captured his first win of the season from the pole.

Top ten results:

Pos	No.	Driver	Make	Team
1	20	Denny Hamlin	Chevrolet	Joe Gibbs Racing
2	5	Mark Martin	Chevrolet	Hendrick Motorsports
3	60	Carl Edwards	Ford	Roush Racing
4	29	Jeff Burton	Chevrolet	Richard Childress Racing
5	2	Clint Bowyer	Chevrolet	Richard Childress Racing
6	38	Jason Leffler	Toyota	Braun Racing
7	33	Tony Stewart	Chevrolet	Kevin Harvick, Inc.
8	37	Greg Biffle	Ford	Brewco Motorsports
9	24	Casey Mears	Chevrolet	Hendrick Motorsports
10	21	Kevin Harvick	Chevrolet	Richard Childress Racing

Did not qualify: Kevin Lepage (#52)

=== Carquest Auto Parts 300 ===
The Carquest Auto Parts 300 was held May 26 at Lowe's Motor Speedway. Matt Kenseth won the pole. From the drop of the green, pit strategy played into the race. Although he was not running on fresh tires, Kurt Busch amazingly made his tires last for most of the race en route to leading the most laps. However, Busch's day would end as he would end up hitting the wall on lap 148. This accident gave the top 2 positions to Casey Mears and Kasey Kahne. Both drivers needed to rebound heavily from a struggling Nextel Cup season, and both wanted to carry any momentum from this race over into the 600. However, it was the latter Kasey who held off the competition to win his first NASCAR race since October. Former NASCAR champion Ned Jarrett was a guest commentator on the ESPN telecast.

Top ten results:

Pos	No.	Driver	Make	Team
1	9	Kasey Kahne	Dodge	Evernham Motorsports
2	24	Casey Mears	Chevrolet	Hendrick Motorsports
3	2	Clint Bowyer	Chevrolet	Richard Childress Racing
4	29	Jeff Burton	Chevrolet	Richard Childress Racing
5	4	Regan Smith	Chevrolet	Ginn Racing
6	48	Jimmie Johnson	Chevrolet	Hendrick Motorsports
7	17	Matt Kenseth	Ford	Roush Fenway Racing
8	5	Kyle Busch	Chevrolet	Hendrick Motorsports
9	21	Scott Wimmer	Chevrolet	Richard Childress Racing
10	90	Stephen Leicht	Ford	Yates Racing

Did not qualify: Eric McClure (#0), Kevin Lepage (#72), Bill Elliott (#32), Blake Feese (#95)

=== Dover 200 ===
The Dover 200 was held June 2 at Dover International Speedway. Denny Hamlin won the pole. The race would end up being dominated by Carl Edwards, whom many had dubbed the "Concrete Carl" for his victories on concrete. True to his nickname, Edwards dominated the race, leading for 122 of the 200 laps.

Top ten results:

Pos	No.	Driver	Make	Team
1	60	Carl Edwards	Ford	Roush Racing
2	20	Denny Hamlin	Chevrolet	Joe Gibbs Racing
3	21	Scott Wimmer	Chevrolet	Richard Childress Racing
4	24	Casey Mears	Chevrolet	Hendrick Motorsports
5	17	Matt Kenseth	Ford	Roush Fenway Racing
6	59	Marcos Ambrose	Ford	Wood Brothers/JTG Racing
7	77	Kevin Harvick	Chevrolet	Kevin Harvick, Inc.
8	33	Tony Raines	Chevrolet	Kevin Harvick, Inc.
9	22	Mike Bliss	Dodge	Fitz Motorsports
10	35	Bobby Hamilton Jr.	Ford	Team Rensi Motorsports

Did not qualify: None only 43 entries.

=== Federated Auto Parts 300 ===
The Federated Auto Parts 300 presented by Dollar General was held June 9 at Nashville Superspeedway. Steve Wallace won the pole. This race was seen as an opportunity for Busch Series regulars to upset the Cup drivers who had to fly from Pocono to Nashville. Although Carl Edwards had no seat time in a car practiced by Matt McCall, he laid down the 7th quickest lap time. From the drop of the green, the race was a good mix of contending Busch regulars and Cup stars. Although Clint Bowyer seemed to have the car to beat, it was Edwards who had the upper hand and recorded his second consecutive win.

Top ten results:

Pos	No.	Driver	Make	Team
1	60	Carl Edwards	Ford	Roush-Fenway Racing
2	2	Clint Bowyer	Chevrolet	Richard Childress Racing
3	38	Jason Leffler	Toyota	Braun Racing
4	29	Scott Wimmer	Chevrolet	Richard Childress Racing
5	4	Regan Smith	Chevrolet	Ginn Racing
6	11	Jason Keller	Chevrolet	CJM Racing
7	6	David Ragan	Ford	Roush-Fenway Racing
8	16	Todd Kluever	Ford	Roush-Fenway Racing
9	99	David Reutimann	Toyota	Michael Waltrip Racing
10	20	Aric Almirola	Chevrolet	Joe Gibbs Racing

Did not qualify: Justin Ashburn (#05)

=== Meijer 300 ===
The Meijer 300 presented by Oreo was held June 16 at Kentucky Speedway. Regan Smith won his first career pole (even after hitting a seagull on his second qualifying lap), making it seven different pole winners in seven races. Many Busch regulars, including Smith, were aspiring to end the Cup drivers' parade by pulling out a victory. From the drop of the green, it looked as though Smith would be the class of the field. However, a refiring problem during a pit stop cost him 2 laps, but amazingly rallied back. The race, unfortunately for the Busch regulars, would be handed to Carl Edwards. Edwards again dominated the race and looked to have it in hand until he was tagged by Steve Wallace on a restart. It was Stephen Leicht who downed the Buschwhackers and fulfilled that dream to earn his 1st career Busch Series victory.

Top ten results:

Pos	No.	Driver	Make	Team
1	90	Stephen Leicht	Ford	Robert Yates Racing
2	18	Brad Coleman	Chevrolet	Joe Gibbs Racing
3	29	Scott Wimmer	Chevrolet	Richard Childress Racing
4	41	David Stremme	Dodge	Chip Ganassi Racing
5	88	Shane Huffman	Chevrolet	JR Motorsports
6	20	Aric Almirola	Chevrolet	Joe Gibbs Racing
7	47	Kelly Bires	Ford	Wood Brothers/JTG Racing
8	16	David Ragan	Ford	Roush-Fenway Racing
9	22	Mike Bliss	Dodge	Fitz Motorsports
10	37	Greg Biffle	Ford	Brewco Motorsports

Did not qualify: Jerick Johnson (#76)

=== AT&T 250 ===
The AT&T 250 took place on June 23 at The Milwaukee Mile. Aric Almirola won the pole, but in an interesting twist, the No. 20's regular driver, Denny Hamlin, was late getting back from Sonoma, so Almirola took the green flag. The race would be again dominated by Carl Edwards, who was looking to bounce back from his worst finish of the year (33rd at Kentucky). Edwards had the field covered, leading for 123 laps until an unscheduled pit stop forced Edwards down pit road and pinned him a lap down. A tough decision had to be made by Dave Rogers, crew chief on the 20. Hamlin had arrived on the track at lap 43, and Almirola was still running in third. Rogers decided to put Hamlin in the car at lap 59 instead of leaving Almirola in it. The decision, although tough, paid off as Hamlin held off Wisconsin native Scott Wimmer to cross the start/finish line in first, but Almirola was credited with his first career NASCAR Busch Series victory. Hamlin also became the first relief driver to finish first since Jack Ingram handed his car over to Harry Gant at Darlington Raceway and finished first.

Top ten results:

Pos	No.	Driver	Make	Team
1	20	Aric Almirola*	Chevrolet	Joe Gibbs Racing
2	29	Scott Wimmer	Chevrolet	Richard Childress Racing
3	38	Jason Leffler	Toyota	Braun Racing
4	18	Brad Coleman	Chevrolet	Joe Gibbs Racing
5	27	Jason Keller	Ford	CJM Racing
6	10	Todd Bodine	Toyota	Braun Racing
7	99	David Reutimann	Toyota	Michael Waltrip Racing
8	60	Carl Edwards	Ford	Roush Fenway Racing
9	1	Johnny Benson	Chevrolet	Phoenix Racing
10	88	Shane Huffman	Chevrolet	JR Motorsports

Did not qualify: Danny Efland (#01)

Note: Denny Hamlin came in for Almirola on lap 60 and finished first. The win, points, and earnings were given to Almirola.

=== Camping World 200 presented by RVs.com ===
The Camping World 200 presented by RVs.com was held June 30 at New Hampshire International Speedway. Kevin Harvick won the pole. Harvick established that he had the car to beat throughout the race. This domination was highlighted by the fact that he led 166 of 200 laps. The race included a short red flag for a crash involving J. J. Yeley and Marcos Ambrose. Juan Pablo Montoya, coming off his first ever Cup victory and with a new crew chief in Brian Pattie, was taken out by Clint Bowyer on lap 165, setting up the run to the finish. Although points leader Carl Edwards tried many times to pass Harvick, he would settle for second. In an ironic twist, Harvick, driving the No. 21 Chevy, became the 21st different winner in 21 Busch Series races at NHIS. After the race Carl Edwards suffered a 25-point penalty for the use of illegal shocks found after the race.

Top ten results:

Pos	No.	Driver	Make	Team
1	21	Kevin Harvick	Chevrolet	Richard Childress Racing
2	60	Carl Edwards	Ford	Roush Fenway Racing
3	17	Matt Kenseth	Ford	Roush Fenway Racing
4	33	Tony Stewart	Chevrolet	Kevin Harvick, Inc.
5	20	Denny Hamlin	Chevrolet	Joe Gibbs Racing
6	2	Clint Bowyer	Chevrolet	Richard Childress Racing
7	37	Greg Biffle	Ford	Brewco Motorsports
8	99	David Reutimann	Toyota	Michael Waltrip Racing
9	41	Reed Sorenson	Dodge	Chip Ganassi Racing
10	24	Casey Mears	Chevrolet	Hendrick Motorsports

Did not qualify: Ian Henderson (#52)

Note: An accident in practice sent No. 52-Ian Henderson home as he did not have a backup car and was unable to make repairs.

=== Winn-Dixie 250 ===
The Winn-Dixie 250 presented by PepsiCo was held July 6 at Daytona International Speedway. Jason Leffler won the pole. The race was postponed to July 7 due to a rainstorm that cancelled Bud Pole Qualifying for the Nextel Cup Series race to be held there. Throughout the season, Kyle Busch had been hampered by terrible luck, either through faulty pit stops, penalties, or crashes. However, on this day, it looked as though, again, Busch had the car to beat. But this time, he finished the deal in style, holding off Daytona 500 winner Kevin Harvick and Dave Blaney for his first win of the season.

Top ten results:

Pos.	No.	Driver	Make	Team
1	5	Kyle Busch	Chevrolet	Hendrick Motorsports
2	21	Kevin Harvick	Chevrolet	Richard Childress Racing
3	10	Dave Blaney	Toyota	Braun Racing
4	18	Tony Stewart	Chevrolet	Joe Gibbs Racing
5	2	Clint Bowyer	Chevrolet	Richard Childress Racing
6	9	Kasey Kahne	Dodge	Evernham Motorsports
7	41	Reed Sorenson	Dodge	Chip Ganassi Racing
8	24	Casey Mears	Chevrolet	Hendrick Motorsports
9	38	Jason Leffler	Toyota	Braun Racing
10	25	David Gilliland	Ford	Team Rensi Motorsports

Did not qualify: None

=== USG Durock 300 ===
The USG Durock 300 was held on July 14 at Chicagoland Speedway. Denny Hamlin won the pole. Fresh off of his first victory of the season, Kyle Busch would again take command of the race. However, this race featured many contending drivers, including the likes of Matt Kenseth, Busch Series points leader Carl Edwards, and the Richard Childress Racing trio of Jeff Burton, Kevin Harvick, and Clint Bowyer. The race would feature many twists, including many of the above-mentioned drivers struggling to simply get onto pit road for a pit stop. For Burton, his problem was heavily documented by ABC as he was enduring 100-degree heat inside his car without a working AC system. Eventually, the moment of the race would be decided under a caution flag. As Kyle Busch, who was leading the race, ducked down pit road, it appeared as though all of the leaders would follow suit. However, the other leaders faked the dominant Busch onto pit road, forcing the frustrated driver to rally to 5th by the end. Up front, Kevin Harvick pulled away from Matt Kenseth to become the first Busch Series repeat winner at Chicagoland.

Top ten results:

Pos.	No.	Driver	Make	Team
1	21	Kevin Harvick	Chevrolet	Richard Childress Racing
2	17	Matt Kenseth	Ford	Roush Fenway Racing
3	29	Jeff Burton	Chevrolet	Richard Childress Racing
4	2	Clint Bowyer	Chevrolet	Richard Childress Racing
5	5	Kyle Busch	Chevrolet	Hendrick Motorsports
6	15	Paul Menard	Chevrolet	Dale Earnhardt, Inc.
7	20	Denny Hamlin	Chevrolet	Joe Gibbs Racing
8	33	Tony Stewart	Chevrolet	Kevin Harvick, Inc.
9	10	Dave Blaney	Toyota	Braun Racing
10	90	Stephen Leicht	Ford	Robert Yates Racing

Did not qualify: Chris Horn (#58), Justin Ashburn (#05)

=== Gateway 250 ===
The Gateway 250 was held July 21 at Gateway International Raceway. Scott Wimmer won his first career pole. The race would feature many "young guns", or drivers who had a lot of talent but no experience. Featuring over 19 rookies, including the likes of Landon Cassill, development driver for Hendrick Motorsports, Travis Kittleson and Brad Coleman, driving for Joe Gibbs Racing, Third-generation driver Brad Keselowski, among others. However, with a high number of young drivers in the field, mixed with a difficult racetrack would combine to form many caution flags. However, Reed Sorenson, who had won at GIR in 2005, was looking to snap his 61-race losing streak. He would do so, avoiding accidents, and even coming back from an unscheduled green flag pit stop to take his first victory of the season.

Top ten results:

Pos.	No.	Driver	Make	Team
1	41	Reed Sorenson	Dodge	Chip Ganassi Racing
2	29	Scott Wimmer	Chevrolet	Richard Childress Racing
3	99	David Reutimann	Toyota	Michael Waltrip Racing
4	38	Jason Leffler	Toyota	Braun Racing
5	6	David Ragan	Ford	Roush Fenway Racing
6	60	Carl Edwards	Ford	Roush Fenway Racing
7	42	Kevin Hamlin	Dodge	Chip Ganassi Racing
8	77	Ron Hornaday Jr.	Chevrolet	Kevin Harvick, Inc.
9	1	J. J. Yeley	Chevrolet	Phoenix Racing
10	03	Todd Bodine	Toyota	Germain Racing

Did not qualify: Mike Harmon (#44)

=== Kroger 200 ===
The Kroger 200 benefiting Riley Hospital for Children was held on July 28 at O'Reilly Raceway Park. Aric Almirola won the pole. Fresh from qualifying at the Brickyard, the Nextel Cup drivers converged with the Busch regulars at ORP. The race would be dominated by Greg Biffle, who is in the midst of a dismal year. Biffle showed the field that he had not lost any talent, leading 94 of the 200 laps. However, Busch regular Jason Leffler would trump the "Buschwhackers" with a pass on Biffle with 2 to go. Leffler would hold on the get his second career victory since 2004 and the historic first win for Toyota in a stock car.

Top ten results:

Pos.	No.	Driver	Make	Team
1	38	Jason Leffler	Toyota	Braun Racing
2	16	Greg Biffle	Ford	Roush Fenway Racing
3	99	David Reutimann	Toyota	Michael Waltrip Racing
4	60	Carl Edwards	Ford	Roush Fenway Racing
5	77	Ron Hornaday Jr.	Chevrolet	Kevin Harvick, Inc.
6	20	Aric Almirola	Chevrolet	Joe Gibbs Racing
7	29	Scott Wimmer	Chevrolet	Richard Childress Racing
8	42	Kevin Hamlin	Dodge	Chip Ganassi Racing
9	10	Mike Bliss	Toyota	Braun Racing
10	88	Brad Keselowski	Chevrolet	JR Motorsports

Did not qualify: Mike Potter (#00)

Note: Following the race, Greg Biffle was fined $5,000 and place on probation until December 17 for failing to meet his post-race media obligations.

=== NAPA Auto Parts 200 ===
The inaugural NAPA Auto Parts 200 presented by Dodge took place on August 4 at Circuit Gilles Villeneuve in Montréal, Quebec, Canada. This was the Busch Series second international road course and the first time that any of NASCAR's top three series has gone to Canada. Canadian native and ex-Champ Car driver Patrick Carpentier won his first career pole. The race would be dominated by former V8 Supercars champion and Busch Series rookie Marcos Ambrose. However, road course ringers such as Scott Pruett and Niclas Jönsson, "Buschwhackers" Carl Edwards, Robby Gordon, and Kevin Harvick, along with Canadian natives Ron Fellows and Carpentier. The race was predicted to be a wreckfest due to the many hard braking points along the circuit. However, there were only five caution flags, with three for blown engines. With the race winding down, many drivers tried desperate moves to get to the front. The excitement started when Harvick tangled with road course ringers Pruett and Fellows, causing a major pileup involving the likes of Jeff Burton, Brad Coleman, and Andy Pilgrim. However, Robby Gordon was thought to have made the winning pass of Ambrose in Turn 3 before Ambrose spun Gordon out. During the ensuing caution, Gordon had not maintained the minimum speed limit to maintain one's position, and was to be placed behind Ron Fellows. Gordon, however, could not find Fellows' car and was black-flagged. In an unsurprising move, Gordon bumped back Ambrose and spun him out, handing the race lead to Kevin Harvick. Going from last to first, and being on a shaky fuel mileage strategy, Harvick held off polesitter Carpentier to win the inaugural Busch Series race in Montreal. Gordon was disqualified from his position, and suspended for the Nextel Cup Pennsylvania 500 the following day. Two days later, Gordon was docked $35,000 (US), and was placed on probation for the rest of 2007. Once the caution came out on Lap 72 the field was frozen. Once the field is frozen, all cars must maintain cautious pace in order to be scored. At the time that the field was frozen, the 59 was in the lead. The 55 did not maintain cautious pace and by NASCAR rules, cars not maintaining cautious pace are scored only when they blend back into the continuous line. The 55 based on our scoring was ordered to blend back in behind the 33 [and] in front of the 7. The tower ordered the 55 multiple times to get into position. The directive was acknowledged by the crew chief of the 55 and the crew chief also communicated the order to the driver of the 55. The driver ignored NASCAR’s directive. He was warned that he would be black-flagged if he did not comply. Once the 55 crossed the start-finish line he was posted per the NASCAR rule book and at that time the directive to display the black flag was given. After contact with the 59 on Lap 73, NASCAR took emergency action per the rule book Section 12-2 thus parking the 55, which was also ignored. The black flag with the white cross was displayed to the 55 when it crossed the start-finish line on Lap 74. The 55 finished the race in the 18th position. Patrick Carpentier, who finished 2nd suffered a 25 point penalty for an unapproved adjustment on his car found during post-race inspection.

Top ten results:

Pos.	No.	Driver	Make	Team
1	21	Kevin Harvick	Chevrolet	Richard Childress Racing
2	22	Patrick Carpentier	Dodge	Fitz Motorsports
3	1	Max Papis	Chevrolet	Phoenix Racing
4	33	Ron Fellows	Chevrolet	Kevin Harvick, Inc.
5	90	Stephen Leicht	Ford	Yates Racing
6	14	Kyle Krisiloff	Ford	Carl A. Haas Motorsports
7	59	Marcos Ambrose	Ford	Wood Brothers/JTG Racing
8	18	Brad Coleman	Chevrolet	Joe Gibbs Racing
9	99	David Reutimann	Toyota	Michael Waltrip Racing
10	29	Jeff Burton	Chevrolet	Richard Childress Racing

Did not qualify: None

=== Zippo 200 at The Glen ===
The Zippo 200 at The Glen was held August 11 at Watkins Glen International. Kurt Busch won the pole. This is the final road course on the Busch Series schedule. Busch would dominate early, but the entire race changed when road course ringer Max Papis blew an engine on lap 2. Pit strategy was key at this point as many chose to pit for fresh tires. One of those was Montreal winner Kevin Harvick, who took command on lap 50 and never looked back as he won his second consecutive road course race, and tied Jack Ingram for second on the all-time wins list with 31.

Top ten results:

Pos.	No.	Driver	Make	Team
1	21	Kevin Harvick	Chevrolet	Richard Childress Racing
2	29	Jeff Burton	Chevrolet	Richard Childress Racing
3	39	Kurt Busch	Dodge	Penske Racing
4	15	Paul Menard	Chevrolet	Dale Earnhardt, Inc.
5	18	Brad Coleman	Chevrolet	Joe Gibbs Racing
6	17	Matt Kenseth	Ford	Roush Fenway Racing
7	77	Bobby Labonte	Chevrolet	Kevin Harvick, Inc.
8	5	Casey Mears	Chevrolet	Hendrick Motorsports
9	47	Andy Lally	Ford	Wood Brothers/JTG Racing
10	12	Ryan Newman	Dodge	Penske Racing

Did not qualify: None only 41 entries.

=== CarFax 250 ===
The CarFax 250 was held August 18 at Michigan International Speedway. Greg Biffle won the pole. From the drop of the green flag, it was established that the two best cars belonged to Matt Kenseth and Denny Hamlin. Taking advantage of the multi-grooved racetrack, the two swapped lines almost every lap. However, the bigger story of the day was with Busch Series points leader Carl Edwards. Although his points lead in drivers standings was immense, that was not the case for owners points, as his two consecutive finishes of 30th or worse put the No. 29 car of Richard Childress Racing only 41 points behind. Edwards was hoping to get his season back on track. However, that was not to be as he got loose off of turn 2 and lost a lap, giving him another 30th or worse finish. While Edwards struggled, Hamlin dominated the race, leading 69 laps en route to his second win of the season.

Top ten results:

Pos.	No.	Driver	Make	Team
1	20	Denny Hamlin	Chevrolet	Joe Gibbs Racing
2	17	Matt Kenseth	Ford	Roush Fenway Racing
3	21	Kevin Harvick	Chevrolet	Richard Childress Racing
4	29	Jeff Burton	Chevrolet	Richard Childress Racing
5	16	Greg Biffle	Ford	Roush Fenway Racing
6	10	Brian Vickers	Toyota	Braun Racing
7	15	Paul Menard	Chevrolet	Dale Earnhardt, Inc.
8	03	Todd Bodine	Toyota	Germain Racing
9	24	Casey Mears	Chevrolet	Hendrick Motorsports
10	2	Clint Bowyer	Chevrolet	Richard Childress Racing

Did not qualify: Ron Young (#71), Eric McClure (#0)

=== Food City 250 ===
The Food City 250 was held on August 24 at Bristol Motor Speedway. Jason Leffler won the pole. Based on the racing that the truck race provided, the Busch race was expected to be no different with the use of the outside lane and more two wide racing. From the green, it appeared as though Jeff Burton would have the car to beat. However, his night ended abruptly when Eric McClure blew a right front tire in front of Burton, handing the lead back to Leffler. Pit strategy and tires were key in this race, as the lead was traded between Kyle Busch, Leffler, David Reutimann, and Ryan Newman. One highlight of the race was when the red flag came out during the middle of this race for a hard crash between rookie Marcos Ambrose and Robert Richardson Jr. Busch's shot at victory would end with a controversial commitment line violation, although commentator Andy Petree noted that Busch did fake going onto pit road. Back at the front, the lead had been given to Ryan Newman, who was on 170 lap old tires. However, the cars of Kasey Kahne, Jason Leffler, and David Reutimann were all lurking in Newmans mirror. Finally, with 10 laps to go, Kahne made a daring three wide pass on Newman and Leffler going into turn one. The inevitable contact ruined Newman's right front tire, ending his night. Surprisingly, with 5 laps to go, NASCAR on ESPN lost its satellite feed, ruining the suspenseful finish for TV viewers. ESPN came back with Kahne taking the checkered flag and Leffler spinning across the line in second after a tap from Reutimann.

Top ten results:

Pos.	No.	Driver	Make	Team
1	9	Kasey Kahne	Dodge	Gillett Evernham Motorsports
2	38	Jason Leffler	Toyota	Braun Racing
3	99	David Reutimann	Toyota	Michael Waltrip Racing
4	5	Kyle Busch	Chevrolet	Hendrick Motorsports
5	21	Scott Wimmer	Chevrolet	Richard Childress Racing
6	6	David Ragan	Ford	Roush Fenway Racing
7	88	Brad Keselowski	Chevrolet	JR Motorsports
8	2	Clint Bowyer	Chevrolet	Richard Childress Racing
9	26	Jamie McMurray	Ford	Roush Fenway Racing
10	20	Aric Almirola	Chevrolet	Joe Gibbs Racing

Did not qualify: No. 54-Brad Teague (#54), Derrike Cope (#49), Jason White (#08)

NOTE: The No. 08 of Jason White withdrew his entry after a crash in practice.

=== Camping World 300 presented by RVs.com ===
The Camping World 300 presented by RVs.com was held on September 1 at California Speedway. Denny Hamlin won the pole. At the start, the dominant cars of the race belonged to Jimmie Johnson, Brian Vickers, Hamlin, and Jeff Burton. Many felt that Vickers' No. 10 Toyota was the car to beat. However, late in the race, his tires wore out on him and Vickers was later involved in a late race crash, involving Stephen Leicht, spring race winner Matt Kenseth, and Busch Series points leader Carl Edwards. The race took a scary turn when the car of Brad Keselowski was involved in a fiery four-car incident involving A. J. Allmendinger, Eric McClure and J. J. Yeley. ESPN determined that Keselowski was heading for the Turn 1 wall at over 140 mph (230 km/h) and instantly decelerated on impact. Keselowski was later airlifted to the hospital for a bruised leg. Afterwards, the lead would be traded between Burton, Kyle Busch, and polesitter Denny Hamlin. On the fifth caution flag of the night, Burton, knowing he would be 3 laps short on fuel, decided to come down pit road and take on fresh tires while Busch stayed out and inherited the lead. Burton's strategy worked as he passed Busch with 8 laps to go and held on for his third win of the season.

Top ten results:

Pos.	No.	Driver	Make	Team
1	29	Jeff Burton	Chevrolet	Richard Childress Racing
2	5	Kyle Busch	Chevrolet	Hendrick Motorsports
3	20	Denny Hamlin	Chevrolet	Joe Gibbs Racing
4	48	Jimmie Johnson	Chevrolet	Hendrick Motorsports
5	21	Clint Bowyer	Chevrolet	Richard Childress Racing
6	9	Kasey Kahne	Dodge	Gillett Evernham Motorsports
7	33	Kevin Harvick	Chevrolet	Kevin Harvick, Inc.
8	26	Jamie McMurray	Ford	Roush Fenway Racing
9	22	Robby Gordon	Dodge	Fitz Motorsports
10	6	David Ragan	Ford	Roush Fenway Racing

Did not qualify: None only 42 entries.

=== Emerson Radio 250 ===
The Emerson Radio 250 was held September 7 at Richmond International Raceway. Kyle Busch won the pole. From the drop of the green, it was established that Busch had the car to beat. The only other car that could challenge the nearly unstoppable Busch was that of Matt Kenseth, who led for 17 laps before spinning late to avoid a spinning Paul Menard. The red flag was brought out late for a blown engine by Derrike Cope. Kyle Busch took command after the red flag and would lead a total of 225 laps en route to his second victory at RIR.

Top ten results:

Pos.	No.	Driver	Make	Team
1	5	Kyle Busch	Chevrolet	Hendrick Motorsports
2	60	Carl Edwards	Ford	Roush Fenway Racing
3	12	Ryan Newman	Dodge	Penske Racing
4	17	Matt Kenseth	Ford	Roush Fenway Racing
5	22	Mike Bliss	Dodge	Fitz Motorsports
6	10	Brian Vickers	Toyota	Braun Racing
7	20	Denny Hamlin	Chevrolet	Joe Gibbs Racing
8	29	Scott Wimmer	Chevrolet	Richard Childress Racing
9	9	Kasey Kahne	Dodge	Gillett Evernham Motorsports
10	11	Jason Keller	Chevrolet	CJM Racing

Did not qualify: Kertus Davis (#01), Morgan Shepherd (#89), Alex García (#98)

=== RoadLoans.com 200 ===
The RoadLoans.com 200 was held September 22 at Dover International Speedway. Greg Biffle won the pole. During NASCAR on ESPN's broadcast, it was documented that Denny Hamlin had a case of the flu and had future teammate Kyle Busch standing by. The other story of the day was the amount of so-called "young guns" such as Brad Keselowski, Steve Wallace, Danny Efland, Kyle Krisiloff, and development drivers Landon Cassill and Brad Keselowski. The high number of these young drivers combined with the tricky and physically demanding "Monster Mile" made into a crashfest, including 13 caution flags. The big highlight of the race was when Robby Gordon was attempting to block the No. 41 of Reed Sorenson. Tony Raines was clipped by Gordon. In a fit of rage, and due to the fact that Tony's sponsor, RoadLoans.com, was sponsoring the race, exited his car, and threw his helmet at Gordon. However, the helmet missed and bounced off another car. Raines received a 25-point penalty after the race. In the melee, many strong cars, such as those of polesitter Biffle and Mike Bliss had pit problems early on, but both rallied to finish fourth and ninth, respectively. However, making no mistakes at all was Denny Hamlin, who avoided the carnage to dominate, leading 138 of 200 laps, holding off hometown hero Martin Truex Jr. for his third win of the season.

Top ten results:

Pos.	No.	Driver	Make	Team
1	20	Denny Hamlin	Chevrolet	Joe Gibbs Racing
2	8	Martin Truex Jr.	Chevrolet	Dale Earnhardt, Inc.
3	17	Matt Kenseth	Ford	Roush Fenway Racing
4	22	Mike Bliss	Dodge	Fitz Motorsports
5	41	Reed Sorenson	Dodge	Chip Ganassi Racing
6	60	Carl Edwards	Ford	Roush Fenway Racing
7	88	Brad Keselowski	Chevrolet	JR Motorsports
8	11	Jason Keller	Chevrolet	CJM Racing
9	16	Greg Biffle	Ford	Roush Fenway Racing
10	99	David Reutimann	Toyota	Michael Waltrip Racing

Did not qualify: None only 43 entries.

=== Yellow Transportation 300 ===
The Yellow Transportation 300 was held on September 29 at Kansas Speedway. Matt Kenseth won the pole. This was a historic race for veteran Jason Keller because when he took the green flag for this race, it marked his 417th Busch Series start, tying Tommy Houston for 1st on the all time starts list. From the start, Kenseth established himself as the car to beat. While Kenseth led, other drivers had trouble. Seemingly out of his slump, points leader Carl Edwards experienced trouble again, in the form of a cut tire sending him into the wall with just under 50 laps to go. Kenseth's domination was short lived, however, as cars such as those of Emporia native Clint Bowyer and Kyle Busch came to life. Busch was especially determined as he was forced to rally from an early speeding penalty. On the final restart with 14 to go, Kenseth and Busch would have a shootout to the checkered flag, with Busch prevailing by .085 thousandths of a second.

Top ten results:

Pos.	No.	Driver	Make	Team
1	5	Kyle Busch	Chevrolet	Hendrick Motorsports
2	17	Matt Kenseth	Ford	Roush Fenway Racing
3	24	Casey Mears	Chevrolet	Hendrick Motorsports
4	2	Clint Bowyer	Chevrolet	Richard Childress Racing
5	26	Jamie McMurray	Ford	Roush Fenway Racing
6	20	Denny Hamlin	Chevrolet	Joe Gibbs Racing
7	15	Paul Menard	Chevrolet	Dale Earnhardt, Inc.
8	29	Jeff Burton	Chevrolet	Richard Childress Racing
9	10	Brian Vickers	Toyota	Braun Racing
10	16	Greg Biffle	Ford	Roush Fenway Racing

Did not qualify: Morgan Shepherd (#89), Jennifer Jo Cobb (#44), Josh Krug (#61)

Note: The No. 61 of Josh Krug did not make an attempt due to a crash in practice.

=== Dollar General 300 ===
The Dollar General 300 was held on October 12 at Lowe's Motor Speedway. By taking the green flag for the race, Jason Keller became the all time starts leader in the NASCAR Busch Series with 418. Greg Biffle won the pole. With the craziness of the previous year's race, much of the same was expected out of this year's race. The combination of a freshly paved racetrack, hard Goodyear tires, and a famously loose turn 4, the race became one of survival as driver after driver spun. Another top storyline was the "fight" for the drivers championship. Carl Edwards simply needed David Reutimann to struggle to wrap up the championship. To the surprise of ESPN analyst Andy Petree, most of the driver who caused the cautions were Cup drivers in the Chase. "The Big One" was surprisingly triggered by 2nd place in Nextel Cup points Jimmie Johnson, who spun alone in turn 2, collecting points leader Edwards, Matt Kenseth, Keller, and Kentucky winner Stephen Leicht. Other wrecks involved polesitter Biffle and Clint Bowyer, although the latter was able to rally for an eighth-place finish. While the wrecks were taking place, Jeff Burton, forced to the back because of an engine change, steadily worked his way through the field, taking the lead on lap 169. He would not look back as he held off Kyle Busch and Dale Earnhardt Jr. for his third win at Lowe's.

Top ten results:

Pos.	No.	Driver	Make	Team
1	29	Jeff Burton	Chevrolet	Richard Childress Racing
2	5	Kyle Busch	Chevrolet	Hendrick Motorsports
3	8	Dale Earnhardt Jr.	Chevrolet	Dale Earnhardt, Inc.
4	18	Aric Almirola	Chevrolet	Joe Gibbs Racing
5	20	Denny Hamlin	Chevrolet	Joe Gibbs Racing
6	6	David Ragan	Ford	Roush Fenway Racing
7	55	Robby Gordon	Ford	Robby Gordon Motorsports
8	2	Clint Bowyer	Chevrolet	Richard Childress Racing
9	47	Kelly Bires	Ford	Wood Brothers/JTG Racing
10	33	Kevin Harvick	Chevrolet	Kevin Harvick, Inc.

Did not qualify: Eric McClure (#0), D. J. Kennington (#72), Travis Kittleson (#61)

=== Sam's Town 250 ===
The Sam's Town 250 was held October 27 at Memphis Motorsports Park. Marcos Ambrose won his first NASCAR career pole. This race marked the Busch Series debut of 2007 Indianapolis 500 winner and 2007 IndyCar season champion Dario Franchitti, as well as Rolex Sports Car Series driver Colin Braun. Also, 18-year-old Chase Austin became the first African-American to start a Busch Series race since Bill Lester in 1999. The race would be dominated by crashes, including one that thwarted Edwards' bid to lock up the championship. Through all the wrecks, a previously winless Reutimann dominated the race, holding off Mike Bliss and David Ragan on a green-white-checkered finish to win his first career Busch Series race and the second for Toyota on a short track. The race was slowed by 25 cautions, a record for the year and 1 caution short of the Series all-time record which occurred in 1992. Ron Young, who finished 17th, suffered a 50-point penalty after illegal shock absorbers were found during post-race inspection.

Top ten results:

Pos.	No.	Driver	Make	Team
1	99	David Reutimann	Toyota	Michael Waltrip Racing
2	22	Mike Bliss	Dodge	Fitz Motorsports
3	6	David Ragan (R)	Ford	Roush Fenway Racing
4	59	Marcos Ambrose (R)	Ford	Wood Brothers/JTG Racing
5	38	Jason Leffler	Toyota	Braun Racing
6	29	Scott Wimmer	Chevrolet	Richard Childress Racing
7	26	Jamie McMurray	Ford	Roush Fenway Racing
8	11	Jason Keller	Chevrolet	CJM Racing
9	88	Brad Keselowski	Chevrolet	JR Motorsports
10	49	Brian Keselowski	Chevrolet	Jay Robinson Racing

Did not qualify: Kertus Davis (#01), Carl Long (#54), Morgan Shepherd (#89), Marc Mitchell (#12), Mike Harmon (#44), Chris Lawson (#52)

=== O'Reilly Challenge ===
The O'Reilly Challenge was held November 3 at Texas Motor Speedway. Memphis winner David Reutimann earned his first career pole. Tony Stewart dominated the day, leading 144 laps. However, a collision with the lapped car of Kyle Krisiloff put him in 16th place after repairs to his car, later rallying to 7th. Greg Biffle would pass Denny Hamlin on lap 140 for the lead, it seemed he was on his way to his first Busch Series victory of the season but he pitted on lap 166 for what he thought was a flat tire but later it turned out that the tire was fine. Kevin Harvick would take over the top spot, easily holding off Kyle Busch for his third consecutive fall Texas win. Carl Edwards clinched the championship and finished 11th in the race.

Top ten results:

Pos.	No.	Driver	Make	Team
1	21	Kevin Harvick	Chevrolet	Richard Childress Racing
2	5	Kyle Busch	Chevrolet	Hendrick Motorsports
3	20	Denny Hamlin	Chevrolet	Joe Gibbs Racing
4	2	Clint Bowyer	Chevrolet	Richard Childress Racing
5	17	Matt Kenseth	Ford	Roush Fenway Racing
6	88	Brad Keselowski	Chevrolet	JR Motorsports
7	20	Tony Stewart	Chevrolet	Kevin Harvick, Inc.
8	29	Jeff Burton	Chevrolet	Richard Childress Racing
9	33	Tony Raines	Chevrolet	Kevin Harvick, Inc.
10	90	Stephen Leicht	Ford	Robert Yates Racing

Did not qualify: Brett Rowe (#05), D. J. Kennington (#72), Mike Harmon (#44)

=== Arizona.Travel 200 ===
The Arizona.Travel 200 was held November 10 at Phoenix International Raceway. Clint Bowyer won his first pole of the season. The race was slowed by 11 cautions and 2 red flags. Kyle Busch dominated the race leading 132 laps and holding off Matt Kenseth (who had lost his power steering) on a green-white-checkered finish. This race marked the end of Kyle Busch's 4 year Busch Series career at Hendrick Motorsports as Mark Martin drove the No. 5 at the Homestead-Miami race. Beginning in 2008 Kyle Busch will drive for Joe Gibbs Racing. Matt Kenseth suffered a 25-point penalty for unapproved adjustments found during post-race inspection.

Top ten results:

Pos.	No.	Driver	Make	Team
1	5	Kyle Busch	Chevrolet	Hendrick Motorsports
2	17	Matt Kenseth	Ford	Roush Fenway Racing
3	2	Clint Bowyer	Chevrolet	Richard Childress Racing
4	29	Scott Wimmer	Chevrolet	Richard Childress Racing
5	21	Kevin Harvick	Chevrolet	Richard Childress Racing
6	9	Kasey Kahne	Dodge	Gillett Evernham Motorsports
7	60	Carl Edwards	Ford	Roush Fenway Racing
8	38	Jason Leffler	Toyota	Braun Racing
9	26	Jamie McMurray	Ford	Roush Fenway Racing
10	77	Ron Hornaday Jr.	Chevrolet	Kevin Harvick, Inc.

Did not qualify: Jennifer Jo Cobb (#44), Eric McClure (#0), Morgan Shepherd (#89), Brian Pannone (#34)

=== Ford 300 ===
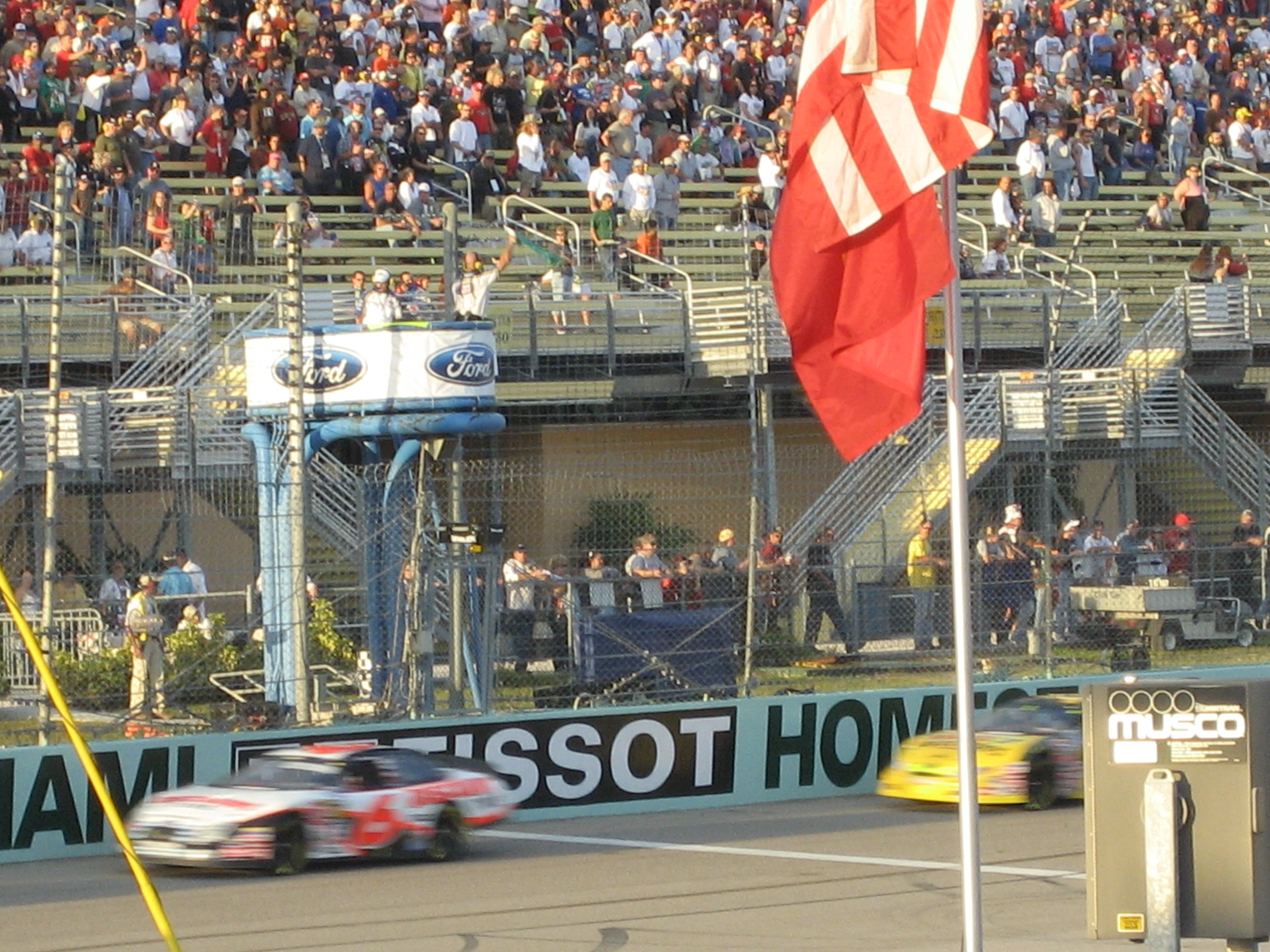
No. 6-David Ragan leads No. 10-Dave Blaney to the first restart of the Ford 300.

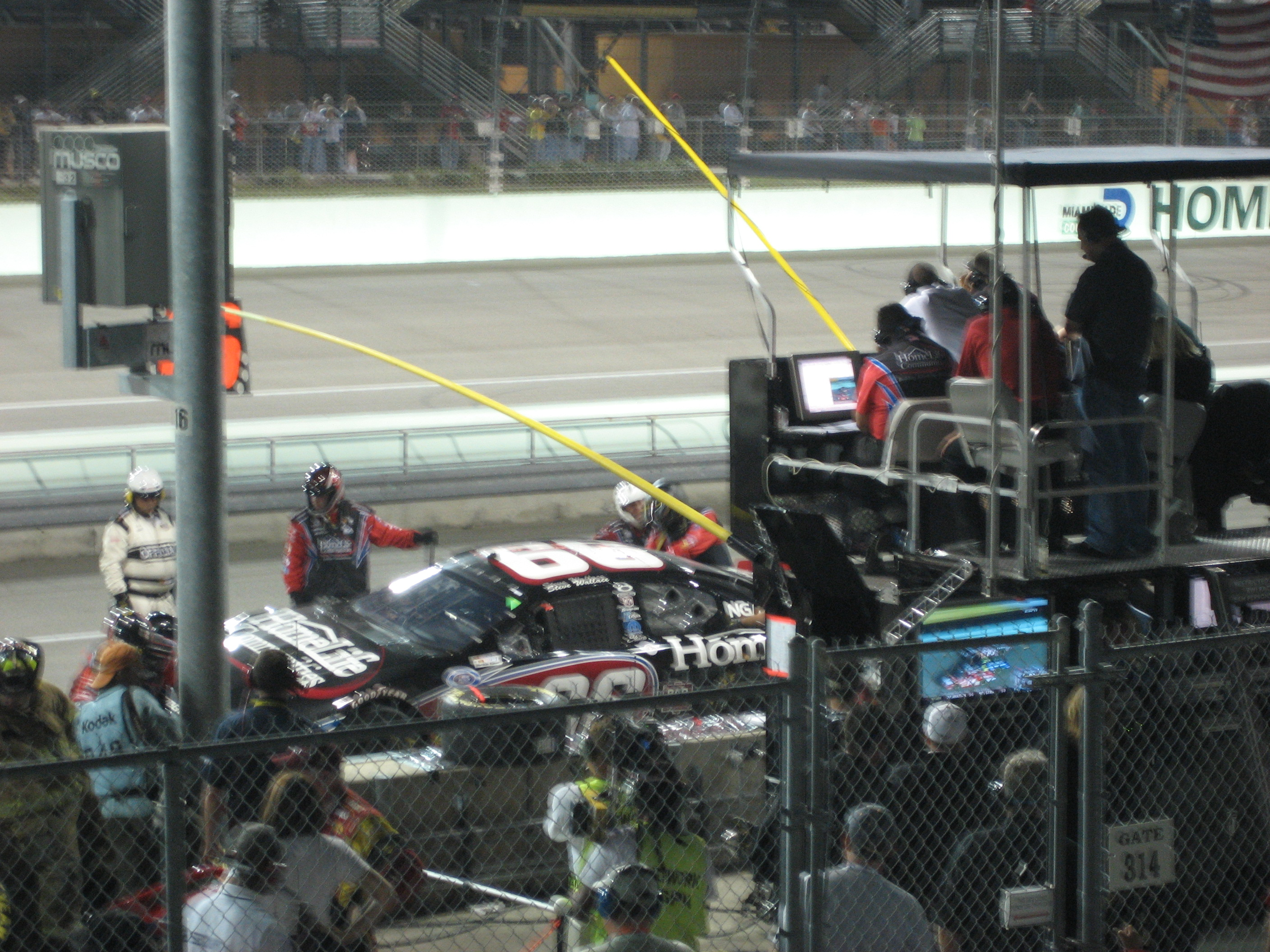
No. 66-Steve Wallace's team works on his car after making contact with another car during the Ford 300.

The Ford 300 was held November 17 at Homestead-Miami Speedway. David Ragan won the pole (David chose to start the race in the outside lane rather than the inside lane; all pole winners are given this option in NASCAR races). This was the final race with Anheuser-Busch sponsorship, and Carl Edwards was officially crowned the 2007 and final Busch Series champion, as Nationwide Insurance takes over in 2008. Jeff Burton would take the final checkered flag of 2007 and with it, Richard Childress' third owner's championship.

Top ten results:

Pos.	No.	Driver	Make	Team
1	29	Jeff Burton	Chevrolet	Richard Childress Racing
2	5	Mark Martin	Chevrolet	Hendrick Motorsports
3	17	Matt Kenseth	Ford	Roush Fenway Racing
4	60	Carl Edwards	Ford	Roush Fenway Racing
5	90	Stephen Leicht	Ford	Yates Racing
6	16	Greg Biffle	Ford	Roush Fenway Racing
7	33	Tony Raines	Chevrolet	Kevin Harvick, Inc.
8	35	Bobby Hamilton Jr.	Ford	Team Rensi Motorsports
9	2	Clint Bowyer	Chevrolet	Richard Childress Racing
10	59	Marcos Ambrose	Ford	Wood Brothers/JTG Racing

Did not qualify: D. J. Kennington (#72), Kertus Davis (#01), Jennifer Jo Cobb (#44), Eric McClure (#0).

== Final standings ==
=== Full Drivers' Championship ===
(key) Bold – Pole position awarded by time. Italics – Pole position set by owner's points. * – Most laps led.

Pos	Driver	DAY	CAL	MXC	LVS	ATL	BRI	NSH	TEX	PHO	TAL	RCH	DAR	CLT	DOV	NSH	KEN	MIL	NHA	DAY	CHI	GTY	IRP	CGV	GLN	MCH	BRI	CAL	RCH	DOV	KAN	CLT	MEM	TEX	PHO	HOM	Pts
1	Carl Edwards	3	4	4	6	4	1*	1*	3	5	10	13	3	17	1*	1	33*	8*	2	11	20	6	4	30	32	28	11	26	2	6	38	33	25	11	7	4	4805
2	David Reutimann	29	14	12	31	13	33	2	6	12	24	9	24	43	15	9	16	7	8	40	17	3	3	9	25	16	3	15	23	10	17	12	1*	**18**	12	15	4187
3	Jason Leffler	22	38	6	37	41	34	4	13	18	35	37	6	31	11	3	14	3	12	**9**	33	4	1	26	27	12	2*	14	11	30	21	19	5	12	8	14	3996
4	Kevin Harvick	1	6		**7**	2	8		11	9	6	4	10	12	7				**1***	2	1			1	1*	3	16	7	24		13	10		1	5	16*	3993
5	David Ragan **(R)**	43	18	14	24	20	13	36	**5**	35	4	14	13	25	32	7	8	12	18	34	19	5	18	19	21	21	6	10	39	32	34	6	3	17	23	**33**	3739
6	Bobby Hamilton Jr.	24	29	17	14	24	18	9	14	34	12	22	20	33	10	13	36	13	20	12	29	13	13	24	22	27	12	21	16	12	20	16	38	14	24	8	3667
7	Stephen Leicht	33	20	27	18	29	20	8	20	28	28	24	26	10	34	33	1	14	25	27	10	23	24	5	17	26	20	29	21	41	19	18	12	10	19	5	3603
8	Marcos Ambrose **(R)**	16	25	8	10	28	28	17	31	22	25	26	19	20	6	36	11	15	30	35	37	18	32	7*	13	19	37	13	15	20	39	40	**4**	30	15	10	3477
9	Greg Biffle	10	5	20	38	40	7		36	6	30	6	8	21	18	28	10		7	37	39		2*	20	11	**5**	14	32	13	**9**	10	**30**		16	36	6	3466
10	Matt Kenseth	12	1*		40	9	2		1	2		2	37	**7**	5				3		2				6	2	34	28	4	3	**2***	31		5	2	3	3451
11	Mike Wallace	23	24	19	13	17	29	30	15	19	33	36	23	23	33	25	25	11	28	15	18	12	20	27	26	23	35	16	31	13	41	15	13	21	17	24	3396
12	Clint Bowyer	4			41	6	5			1*	13	1	5	3		2*			6	5	4					10	8	5	33		4	8		4	**3**	9	3269
13	Denny Hamlin	9	8	2	12				2	4		**41**	**1***	34	**2**			RL	5		7				14	1*		**3**	7	1*	6	5		3	28	13	3224
14	Scott Wimmer	13		30			9	7			34	10		9	3	4	3	2	11	31		**2**	7	QL			5	12	8	29	15	13	6		4		3072
15	Jeff Burton		7		1	1			10	3		3*	4	4	19						3			10	2	4	40	1*			8	1*		8		1	3002
16	Kyle Busch	37*	3		2*	**3***	3		7*	**37**	39	5		8						1*	5*						4	2	**1***		1	2		2	1*		2943
17	J. J. Yeley	DNQ	23	37	19	22	22	12	18	24	17	12	16	26	25	18	12		36	22	11	9	16			17	39	34	19		33	37	11	33	11	40	2889
18	Kyle Krisiloff **(R)**	27	33	16	27	38	39	21	27	23	5	34	28	38	21	27	29	24	32	20	28	36	21	6	37	34	26	41	29	34	28	21	42	27	25	29	2798
19	Steve Wallace	30	22	18	17	35	**31**	14	32	29	26	32	39	30	22	**12**	22	27	15	39	32	28	17	32	34	37	32	25	18	22	37		35	23	37	34	2752
20	Casey Mears	DNQ	2		42	5			4	7	3*	7	9	2	4				10	8	13				8	9	19				3			15		22	2633
21	Mike Bliss						10	10		15	14	33	18	39	9	16	9	25	13	17		33	9				13		5	4	31	29	2	43	32	23	2608
22	Dave Blaney	2	**10**	13	25	16	30	3	25	10	32	16	31	11	16	17	15		35	3	9	35								23		36				26	2491
23	Brent Sherman	21	27	15	39	26	37	20	37	26	16	31	35	35	35	21	24	32	31	24	40	25	33	22	30	40	31	22	34	43	27		21	37			2425
24	Jamie McMurray	42	15		29	14			17	17	36	19		18	20					18	23					11	9	8	12	40	5	38	7		9	19	2331
25	Brad Keselowski **(R)**	DNQ	32	43	34	25	41	38	43	32		35	36	37	24	40					14	26	10			13	7	35	38	7	36	11	9	6	21	17	2297
26	Jason Keller							33					14		13	6	20	5	26		35	30	11			22	24	17	10	8	16	34	8	22	35	28	2206
27	Kasey Kahne	41			28	7	19		28		21			1*	12					6	12					31	1	6	9		12	17			6	25	2199
28	Bobby Labonte	18			8	42	11		22		1		34	22					29	23	16				7	18	27		17	11		14		29		43	1963
29	Aric Almirola	**19**				27	32	19		43	20		41	14		10	6	**1**		28	38		**6**	11			10					4				18	1959
30	Reed Sorenson	38	36		30	39	16		35		27	8		42	27				5	7	15	1*				20	33	11		5		25					1881
31	Regan Smith	26	9	26	33	26	36	5	34	8	23	15	12	5	26	5	**16**			29																	1820
32	Kelly Bires															15	7	30	24	16	24	24	38			32	29	23	26	19	40	9	14	19	22	20	1820
33	Brad Coleman **(R)**			38	35			15	16		**9**	27					2	4				27	31	8	5	15	17			42			33		16		1795
34	Shane Huffman	36	21	21	9	19	38	6	39	42	15	18	27	24	37	19	5	10	23																		1729
35	Tony Stewart	8	11		3	10					2		7						4	4	8					30					11			7*			1723
36	Juan Pablo Montoya **(R)**	40	39	1*	20	8	14		30	21	7	11	15	40	14				34	30	21				33												1689
37	Todd Kluever	14		11		33	12	13		33			38	15		8	23	18	17		26	11		21	20												1687
38	Eric McClure	35	40		26	37	24	26	29	30	18	DNQ	40	DNQ	28	35	32	31	37	36	41	37	29			DNQ	42	37	42	26	42	DNQ	28	40	DNQ	DNQ	1639
39	David Gilliland	20		36	32	31	35		26	16	37	20	33	27	29				19	10	27				16	29	41	18									1597
40	Ward Burton	32	34		15	21	27		21	20	8	25	21	19	17				16	19	22					35											1555
41	David Stremme	DNQ	12		5	11		**11**	19	11			30	16		14	4				25					24	15										1554
42	Stanton Barrett			40			17		33				42	29		38			27		31	20		17				19		17		24	19	38	30		1285
43	Paul Menard	17	37		36	18			9				22								6				4	7			40		7						1208
44	Richard Johns							34								34	28	19				31	15	25					30	28	26	27	23	34	31	35	1185
45	Jon Wood	15	31	10	11	36	43	16	38	25	31	21	32	13																							1154
46	Robert Richardson Jr. **(R)**	28						31	DNQ		19				36	30	34	33	39	26		22	27				38			27			31	32		36	1146
47	Robby Gordon	11				12								32							34			18	36			9		31		7		13	20		1130
48	Danny O'Quinn Jr.						21	23			11					29	38		22				22				18		27				15				952
49	Tony Raines					34				31		23			8					21										35				9	18	7	893
50	Ryan Newman						4			36			11								43				9		28	31	3								851
51	Morgan Shepherd		41			Wth	Wth	42		40	42		43		38	41	42		42		42	39	40	38	39	41	43	39	DNQ	38	DNQ	43	DNQ	39	DNQ	41	829
52	Bobby East															24		22				16	39			38		24	25		22		36			12	806
53	Brian Vickers																			13						6	36	27	6		9				27		796
54	Kevin Hamlin							18								23	21	16				7	8			42											748
55	Mark Martin	5							12				2													14										2	743
56	D. J. Kennington									27		39			23			26					25	37			30		36		29	DNQ	43	DNQ	43	DNQ	719
57	Todd Bodine																	6				10				8			20		14					37	707
58	Mark Green																	21		32	30	19	QL	40		39	25		28		24			36		30	705
59	A. J. Allmendinger																											36	14	21	25	26			13	21	678
60	Dale Earnhardt Jr.	7					6				29									14												3					668
61	Cale Gale							27								26	13	23				29	14										29				658
62	Timothy Peters **(R)**		17				25	32	41	13						20	17																				646
63	Chase Miller															22	18	17				15								16			24				642
64	Ron Hornaday Jr.																	36				8	5	13											10		615
65	Tim McCreadie																	28				14	12						32	24			16				600
66	Johnny Sauter					30	23	35	23	38				36													22				32						587
67	Kertus Davis		30	31				37								32	30						QL			43		33	DNQ		43	42	DNQ	41	41	DNQ	584
68	Sam Hornish Jr. **(R)**	31	35			15		25				43														25								31	39	38	551
69	Kurt Busch				4				8					41											**3**												527
70	Brett Rowe				43			22	40			40				39	39					21	37											DNQ			524
71	Kevin Conway						26								30	31			21									20	43		35						523
72	Landon Cassill																					32	30						22	18			20		34		510
73	Justin Diercks **(R)**	DNQ			22			24	24		40	28				43	31																				505
74	Scott Riggs		16									17	17						14																		460
75	Boris Said			3				29																28	12												452
76	Bryan Clauson																												35		23	20	18	28			443
77	John Graham																							23	31				41				27		26	31	441
78	Derrike Cope											29	25					43			36	42	41		35		DNQ		37								440
79	Brian Keselowski																						23			33							10			11	422
80	Casey Atwood																							QL						14	18	22	QL	26			412
81	Scott Pruett			**5**																				14	18												395
82	Jimmie Johnson													6														4				32					387
83	Jay Sauter		28		21	DNQ	15	28		Wth																											376
84	Martin Truex Jr.	6									41																			2							370
85	Ron Fellows			32																				4	24												328
86	Kevin Lepage				Wth				42	39		42	DNQ	DNQ	40					33					28												306
87	Jeremy Clements																															23	40	42	38	27	305
88	Mike Harmon							40		41							41	38	38			DNQ	43							39			DNQ	DNQ			301
89	Joe Nemechek	34	13		16																																300
90	Jorge Goeters			7																				31	29												297
91	Brad Teague	DNQ					40	39							42	42		39				40	42				DNQ	40									295
92	David Green													28		11	26																				294
93	Patrick Carpentier																							**2**	19											42	293
94	Michael McDowell																																	20	14	32	291
95	Dario Franchitti																																32	25	29	39	277
96	Jeff Green		19		23																					36											255
97	Andy Pilgrim																							15	15												236
98	Bobby Santos III **(R)**											30				37			33													39					235
99	Donnie Neuenberger										38				39					41										25							228
100	Frank Kreyer																	34				38	28												42		226
101	Elliott Sadler									14																								24			212
102	Andy Lally																							29	10												210
103	Ron Young					32							29													DNQ							17				210
104	Alex García **(R)**			34			Wth					Wth												36	23				DNQ								210
105	Max Papis																							3	41												205
106	Sterling Marlin																													15			26				203
107	Michel Jourdain Jr.			25																				16													203
108	Brad Baker																															28	34	35			198
109	Blake Bjorklund																											30				35			33		195
110	Chris Horn																35	40			DNQ										30						174
111	Travis Kvapil														31								QL				21										170
112	Jerick Johnson							41		Wth					41		DNQ	41				41		42													157
113	Marc Mitchell																	20												37			DNQ				155
114	Kenny Wallace		26																			34											QL				146
115	Adrián Fernández			9																																	138
116	Johnny Benson																	9																			138
117	Todd Souza			23																															40		137
118	Shelby Howard																27						36														137
119	Justin Ashburn										22					DNQ				42	DNQ																134
120	Trevor Boys																	29						35													134
121	Niclas Jönsson																							12													132
122	Danny Efland																	DNQ	40			43								36							132
123	Scott Lagasse Jr.																	35					34														119
124	Travis Kittleson																					17										DNQ					112
125	Josh Wise																						19														106
126	Carl Long																													33		41	DNQ				104
127	J. R. Fitzpatrick			33																				43													98
128	Brian Simo			22																																	97
129	Carlos Contreras			35													43																				97
130	Dale Jarrett																										23										94
131	P. J. Jones	Wth		24																																	91
132	Scott Gaylord																							39	40												89
133	Steve Grissom	25																																			88
134	Kerry Earnhardt																			25																	88
135	Germán Quiroga			28																																	84
136	Rogelio López			29																																	76
137	Colin Braun																																30				73
138	Mike MacKenzie																							33													64
139	Deac McCaskill																						35														63
140	Michael Valiante																							34													61
141	A. J. Frank																37																				52
142	Ian Henderson																	37	DNQ																		52
143	Brandon Miller																						QL	QL									37				52
144	Dange Hanniford											38																									49
145	Larry Foyt																			38																	49
146	Jeff Fuller																											38									49
147	John Andretti	39																																			46
148	John Young			39																																	46
149	Matt Carter																																39				46
150	Jamie Mosley																39																				43
151	Joe Fox																							41	38												40
152	Eddie MacDonald																		41																		40
153	Chase Austin																																41				40
154	Caleb Holman						42																														37
155	Mike Potter																	42					DNQ														37
156	Johnny Borneman III																											42									37
157	Randy MacDonald														43				43																		34
158	Michael Waltrip					43																															34
159	Jason White																						26				DNQ										
160	Rubén Pardo			41				43																													
161	Antonio Pérez			42																																	
162	Brian Pannone									DNQ																									DNQ		
163	Bill Elliott													DNQ																							
164	Blake Feese													DNQ																							
165	Jennifer Jo Cobb																														DNQ				DNQ	DNQ	
166	Josh Krug																														DNQ						
167	Chris Lawson																																DNQ				
168	Erik Darnell																	QL					QL														
169	Auggie Vidovich																																QL				
170	Matt McCall																																QL				
171	Chad Blount		Wth																																		
Pos	Driver	DAY	CAL	MXC	LVS	ATL	BRI	NSH	TEX	PHO	TAL	RCH	DAR	CLT	DOV	NSH	KEN	MIL	NHA	DAY	CHI	GTY	IRP	CGV	GLN	MCH	BRI	CAL	RCH	DOV	KAN	CLT	MEM	TEX	PHO	HOM	Pts

=== Owners' championship (Top 15) ===
(key) Bold - Pole position awarded by time. Italics - Pole position set by final practice results or rainout. * – Most laps led.

Pos.	No.	Car Owner	DAY	CAL	MXC	LVS	ATL	BRI	NSH	TEX	PHO	TAL	RCH	DAR	CLT	DOV	NSH	KEN	MIL	NHA	DAY	CHI	GTY	IRP	CGV	GLN	MCH	BRI	CAL	RCH	DOV	KAN	CLT	MEM	TEX	PHO	HOM	Pts
1	29	Richard Childress	13	7	30	1	1	9	7	10	3	34	3*	4	4	19	4	3	2	11	31	3	2	7	10	2	4	40	1	8	29	8	1*	6	8	4	1	5108
2	20	Joe Gibbs	9	8	2	12	10	32	19	2	4	20	**41**	**1**	34	**2**	10	6	**1**	5	28	**7**	17	**6**	11	14	1	10	**3**	7	1	6	5	11	3	28	13	4853
3	60	Jack Roush	3	4	4	6	4	1*	1*	3	5	10	13	3	17	1*	1	33*	8*	2	11	20	6	4	30	32	28	11	26	2	6	38	33	25	11	7	4	4805
4	21	Richard Childress	1	17	24	**4**	5	25	32	41	13	10	10	10	9	3	20	17	28	**1***	2	1	14	12	1	1*	3	5	5	32	24	15	13	16	1	5	16*	4716
5	99	Michael Waltrip	29	14	12	31	13	33	2	6	12	24	9	24	43	15	9	16	7	8	40	17	3	3	9	25	16	3	15	23	10	17	12	1*	**18**	12	15	4187
6	33	DeLana Harvick	8	6	32	3	34	8	27	11	31	2	23	7	12	8	26	13	23	4	21	8	29	14	4	24	30	16	7	24	35	11	10	29	9	18	7	4057
7	9	Ray Evernham	41	16	3	28	7	19	29	28	14	21	17	17	1	12	22	18	17	14	6	12	15	35	28	12	31	1	6	9	16	12	17	24	24	6	25	4028
8	38	Todd Braun	22	38	6	37	41	34	4	13	18	35	37	6	31	11	3	14	3	12	**9**	33	4	1	26	27	12	2*	14	11	30	21	19	5	12	8	14	3996
9	5	Rick Hendrick	37*	3	9	2*	**3***	3		7*	**37**	39	5	2	8						1*	5*				8	14	4	2	**1***	18	1	2	20	2	1*	2	3896
10	17	Jack Roush	12	1*	25	40	9	2		1	2	11	2	37	**7**	5		38		3		2			16	6	2	34	28	4	3	**2***	31		5	2	3	3833
11	22	Armando Fitz	DNQ	12	35	5	11	10	10	19	15	14	33	18	16	9	16	9	25	13	17	25	33	19	**2**	19	24	13	9	5	4	31	29	2	43	32	23	3827
12	6	Jack Roush	43	18	14	24	20	13	36	**5**	35	4	14	13	25	32	7	8	12	18	34	19	5	18	19	21	21	6	10	39	32	34	6	3	17	23	**33**	3739
13	16	Jack Roush	14	5	11	38	33	12	13	36	33	30	6	38	21	18	8	23	18	17	37	39	11	2*	21	20	**5**	21	32	13	**9**	10	**30**	30	16	36	6	3672
14	35	Gary Weisbaum	24	29	17	14	24	18	9	14	34	12	22	20	33	10	13	36	13	20	12	29	13	13	24	22	27	12	21	16	12	20	16	38	14	24	8	3667
15	77	DeLana Harvick	18	30	31	8	42	11	37	22	9	1	4	34	22	7	32	30	36	29	23	16	8	5	13	7	18	27	12	17	11	13	14	37	29	10	43	3660

== See also ==
- 2007 NASCAR NEXTEL Cup Series
- 2007 NASCAR Craftsman Truck Series
- 2007 NASCAR Busch East Series
- 2007 ARCA Re/Max Series
- 2007 NASCAR Whelen Modified Tour
- 2007 NASCAR Whelen Southern Modified Tour
- 2007 NASCAR Canadian Tire Series
- 2007 NASCAR Corona Series
