= Ian Henderson (racing driver) =

American racing driver (born 1980)

- Born: July 16, 1980 (age 46); Piedmont, South Carolina, U.S.

NASCAR O'Reilly Auto Parts Series career
- 1 race run over 1 year
- 2007 position: 142nd
- Best finish: 142nd (2007)
- First race: 2007 AT&T 250 (Milwaukee)
Wins	Top tens	Poles
0	0	0

Ian Henderson (born July 16, 1980) is an American stock car racing driver. Henderson last competed part-time in the NASCAR Busch Series for Jimmy Means Racing. Henderson has also competed in ARCA and the NASCAR K&N Pro Series East.

== Motorsports career results ==
=== NASCAR ===
(key) (Bold – Pole position awarded by qualifying time. Italics – Pole position earned by points standings or practice time. * – Most laps led.)

==== Busch Series ====
NASCAR Busch Series results
Year	Team	No.	Make	1	2	3	4	5	6	7	8	9	10	11	12	13	14	15	16	17	18	19	20	21	22	23	24	25	26	27	28	29	30	31	32	33	34	35	NBSC	Pts	Ref
2007	Means Racing	52	Ford	DAY	CAL	MXC	LVS	ATL	BRI	NSH	TEX	PHO	TAL	RCH	DAR	CLT	DOV	NSH	KEN	MLW; 37	NHA; DNQ	DAY	CHI	GTY	IRP	CGV	GLN	MCH	BRI	CAL	RCH	DOV	KAN	CLT	MEM	TEX	PHO	HOM	142nd	52	

==== Camping World East Series ====
Camping World East Series results
Year	Team	No.	Make	1	2	3	4	5	6	7	8	9	10	11	12	13	NCWESC	Pts	Ref
2008	Mike Henderson	93	Chevy	GRE; DNQ	IOW	SBO; 31	GLN	NHA	TMP	NSH	ADI	LRP	MFD	NHA	DOV	STA	64th	119	

=== ARCA Re/Max Series ===
(key) (Bold – Pole position awarded by qualifying time. Italics – Pole position earned by points standings or practice time. * – Most laps led.)

ARCA Re/Max Series results
Year	Team	No.	Make	1	2	3	4	5	6	7	8	9	10	11	12	13	14	15	16	17	18	19	20	21	22	23	ARMSC	Pts	Ref
2003	Mike Henderson	93	Chevy	DAY	ATL	NSH	SLM	TOL	KEN	CLT	BLN	KAN	MCH	LER	POC	POC	NSH	ISF	WIN	DSF	CHI	SLM	TAL	CLT; DNQ	SBO		N/A	-	
2004	Mike Henderson	93	Chevy	DAY	NSH	SLM	KEN	TOL	CLT; 31	KAN	POC	MCH	SBO	BLN	KEN	GTW	POC	LER	NSH	ISF	TOL	DSF	CHI	SLM	TAL		170th	75	
2006	Mike Henderson	05	Chevy	DAY	NSH	SLM	WIN	KEN	TOL	POC	MCH	KAN	KEN; DNQ	BLN			NSH; 20	MCH; DNQ	ISF	MIL	TOL	DSF	CHI; 23	SLM	TAL	IOW	75th	425	
2006	Gerhart Racing	7	Chevy												POC; 20	GTW											75th	425	
