= Brian Pattie =

NASCAR crew chief (born 1975)

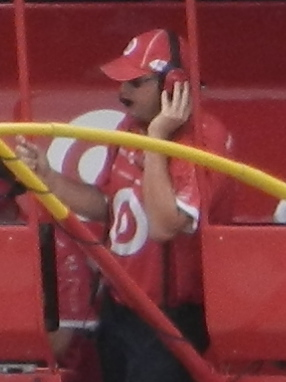
- Pattie at Michigan International Speedway in 2011

Personal information
- Born: Paul Brian Pattie; April 9, 1975 (age 50) Zephyrhills, Florida, U.S.
- Occupation: Crew chief

Sport
- Country: United States
- Sport: NASCAR Craftsman Truck Series
- Team: 7. Spire Motorsports

Paul Brian Pattie (born April 9, 1975) is an American auto racing crew chief who works for Spire Motorsports as the crew chief for their No. 7 Chevrolet Silverado in the NASCAR Craftsman Truck Series, driven by various drivers. He has achieved six wins in the NASCAR Cup Series, one with Montoya (in 2010), three with Bowyer (all in 2012), and two with Stenhouse (both in 2017). He has 21 wins overall as a crew chief.

== Racing career ==
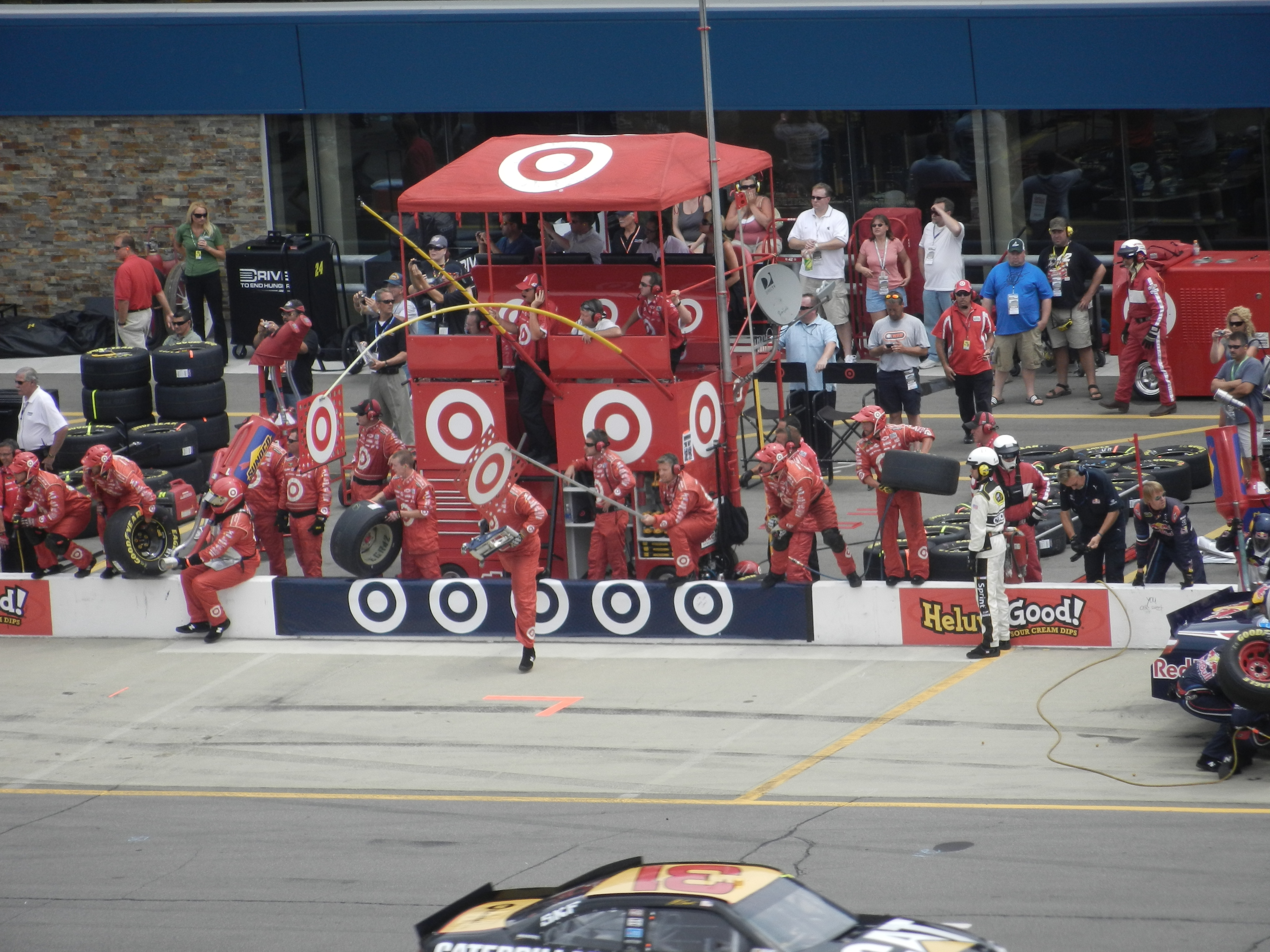
Pattie (standing in the middle on his pit box) and his pit crew waiting for Juan Pablo Montoya to come into his pit stall at Michigan in 2011

In 1994, Pattie began his career as the fabricator for the NEMCO Motorsports team, owned by driver Joe Nemechek in what is now the NASCAR Xfinity Series. In 1996, he started working for Hendrick Motorsports at the 1996 NASCAR Winston Cup Series. He returned to Nemechek in 1997 as the crew chief at the Nationwide Series. Between 1997 and 2003, Pattie only attended a few Cup Series races per year, mostly on road course races, crew chiefing for the No. 87 team, driven by Ron Fellows. Fellows came close to several wins with Pattie as crew chief, finishing 2nd at Watkins Glen in 1999 and leading the most laps at Sonoma in 2001.

In 2003, Pattie started working as the team manager for NEMCO as well as the crew chief for their No. 7 (Randy LaJoie) and 87 (Joe Nemechek) cars. In 2004, Chip Ganassi Racing recruited Pattie as the crew chief for the No. 41 car (Reed Sorenson) in the Nationwide Series. In 2007, he was the crew chief for Dario Franchitti and Scott Pruett. In May 2008, he started working as Juan Pablo Montoya's Cup Series crew chief. The duo remained together until midway through the 2011 season, where he was replaced by Jim Pohlman. Pattie and Montoya qualified for the Chase in 2009 despite going winless. In 2010, they won the race at Watkins Glen, which was Montoya's second Cup win and Pattie's first win in the Cup Series as a crew chief.

In December 2011, Pattie was named as the crew chief for Clint Bowyer at Michael Waltrip Racing, which was expanding to three cars in 2012 with Bowyer's No. 15 team. It was a great year for MWR and Bowyer, who won three races and finished second in points. However, during the 2012 AvdoCare 500 at Phoenix while being interviewed by ESPN's Jamie Little, Pattie used swear words and got fined US$35,000 which led to ESPN having to apologize to viewers. They weren't as successful the next three years, and with Bowyer winless since his three-win season in 2012, the team decided before the race at Michigan in June 2015, to move Pattie to MWR's No. 55 car, driven by David Ragan, in a flip-flop with Ragan's crew chief Billy Scott, who became Bowyer's crew chief.

When MWR shut down following the 2015 season, Pattie moved to Roush Fenway Racing as crew chief for the No. 16 team driven by Greg Biffle. Due to lack of sponsorship, Roush shut down the No. 16 car after 2016, and Pattie was moved to the team's No. 17 car driven by Ricky Stenhouse Jr. In his first year working with Stenhouse, they earned two wins at Talladega in May and Daytona in July, which qualified the team for the playoffs. They remained together for the next three years. After the 2019 season, Stenhouse was released from Roush in favor of Chris Buescher. However, Pattie and Buescher would not work together as the team later confirmed that he would not be back as the crew chief for the No. 17 team in 2020. Pattie eventually followed Stenhouse to JTG Daugherty Racing.

Prior to the 2020 Auto Club 400 at Fontana, the No. 47 team was docked 10 owner and driver points and Pattie was suspended for the race after the car was discovered to have an illegal modification during pre-race inspection.

On November 9, 2022, it was announced that Pattie would leave JTG Daugherty and would become the new crew chief for the Kyle Busch Motorsports No. 51 truck in 2023.

== Biography ==
Pattie was born on April 9, 1975, to Paul Pattie (1946–2007) and Thelma "Hege" Pattie in Zephyrhills, Florida. He attended and graduated from Zephyrhills High School in 1993. He is a long-time friend of former NASCAR driver David Reutimann, and they went to high school together.

Pattie and his wife have four children, three daughters whose names are Alexis, Aubree, and Aleesia, and a son named Brennan.
