= 2006 Hershey's Kissables 300 =

Race details
- Map of Speedway
- Date: February 18, 2006
- Official name: 2006 Hershey's Kissables 300
- Location: Daytona International Speedway in Daytona Beach, Florida
- Course: Tri-oval
- Course length: 2.5 miles (4.023 km)
- Distance: 120 laps, 300 mi (400 km)
- Weather: Sunny
- Average speed: 125.159 mph (201.424 km/h)
- Attendance: 75,000

Pole position
Driver	J. J. Yeley	Joe Gibbs Racing
- Time: 49.155

Most laps led
Driver	Dale Earnhardt Jr.	Dale Earnhardt, Inc.
- Laps: 48

Winner
No. 33	Tony Stewart	Kevin Harvick, Inc.

Television in the United States
- Network: TNT
- Announcers: Bill Weber, Wally Dallenbach Jr., Benny Parsons

The 2006 Hershey's Kissables 300 was a NASCAR Busch Series race held on February 18, 2006, at Daytona International Speedway in Daytona Beach, Florida. This was the first race of the 2006 NASCAR Busch Series and was also the 25th season of the Busch Series. The race was the 25th running of the event. Out of the 49 cars that attempted the race, 18 of those drivers were currently running full time in the Nextel Cup Series. Nextel Cup Series rookie J. J. Yeley won the pole but in the race's end, Tony Stewart would win the Busch Series opener for the second season in a row after a spectacular last lap crash as this race became known as a wreckfest.

== Entry list ==
- (R) denotes rookie driver

#	Driver	Team	Make
00	Johnny Sauter	Haas CNC Racing	Chevrolet
0	Kertus Davis	Davis Motorsports	Chevrolet
01	Jay Sauter	Duesenberg & Leik Motorsports	Chevrolet
1	Jason Keller	Phoenix Racing	Dodge
2	Clint Bowyer	Richard Childress Racing	Chevrolet
4	Mark Green	Biagi Brothers Racing	Dodge
05	Chad Chaffin	Day Enterprise Racing	Chevrolet
5	Kyle Busch	Hendrick Motorsports	Chevrolet
06	Todd Kluever (R)	Roush Racing	Ford
8	Dale Earnhardt Jr.	Dale Earnhardt, Inc.	Chevrolet
9	Kasey Kahne	Evernham Motorsports	Dodge
10	John Andretti (R)	ppc Racing	Ford
11	Paul Menard	Dale Earnhardt, Inc.	Chevrolet
12	David Reutimann	FitzBradshaw Racing	Dodge
14	Tracy Hines (R)	FitzBradshaw Racing	Dodge
16	Greg Biffle	Roush Racing	Ford
18	J. J. Yeley	Joe Gibbs Racing	Chevrolet
20	Denny Hamlin	Joe Gibbs Racing	Chevrolet
21	Jeff Burton	Richard Childress Racing	Chevrolet
22	Kenny Wallace	ppc Racing	Ford
23	Chris Wimmer (R)	Keith Coleman Racing	Chevrolet
25	Ashton Lewis	Team Rensi Motorsports	Ford
27	David Green	Brewco Motorsports	Ford
29	Kevin Harvick	Richard Childress Racing	Chevrolet
32	Jason Leffler	Braun-Akins Racing	Chevrolet
33	Tony Stewart	Kevin Harvick, Inc.	Chevrolet
34	Paul Tracy	Frank Cicci Racing	Chevrolet
35	Regan Smith	Team Rensi Motorsports	Ford
36	Tim Sauter	McGill Motorsports	Chevrolet
38	A. J. Foyt IV (R)	Braun-Akins Racing	Dodge
41	Reed Sorenson	Chip Ganassi Racing	Dodge
43	Aaron Fike	Curb Agajanian Performance Group	Dodge
47	Jon Wood	JTG Racing	Ford
49	Steve Grissom	Jay Robinson Racing	Ford
50	Danny O'Quinn Jr. (R)	Roush Racing	Ford
56	Kevin Lepage	Mac Hill Motorsports	Chevrolet
57	Brian Vickers	Hendrick Motorsports	Chevrolet
58	Donnie Neuenberger	MacDonald Motorsports	Chevrolet
59	Stacy Compton	JTG Racing	Ford
60	Carl Edwards	Roush Racing	Ford
62	Larry Hollenbeck	S.W.A.T Racing	Chevrolet
64	Jamie McMurray	Rusty Wallace, Inc.	Dodge
66	Ken Schrader	Brewco Motorsports	Ford
77	Burney Lamar (R)	Kevin Harvick, Inc.	Chevrolet
87	Joe Nemechek	NEMCO Motorsports	Chevrolet
88	Mark McFarland (R)	JR Motorsports	Chevrolet
90	Elliott Sadler	Robert Yates Racing	Ford
95	Steadman Marlin	Sadler Brothers Racing	Dodge
99	Michael Waltrip	Michael Waltrip Racing	Dodge
Official Entry List

== Qualifying ==
J. J. Yeley won the pole with a time of 49.155 seconds and a speed of 183.094 miles per hour

Grid	No.	Driver	Team	Manufacturer	Time	Speed
1	18	J. J. Yeley	Joe Gibbs Racing	Chevrolet	49.155	183.094
2	43	Aaron Fike	Curb Agajanian Performance Group	Dodge	49.198	182.934
3	2	Clint Bowyer	Richard Childress Racing	Chevrolet	49.199	182.930
4	00	Johnny Sauter	Haas CNC Racing	Chevrolet	49.241	182.774
5	10	John Andretti (R)	ppc Racing	Ford	49.243	182.767
6	90	Elliott Sadler	Robert Yates Racing	Ford	49.286	182.607
7	87	Joe Nemechek	NEMCO Motorsports	Chevrolet	49.302	182.548
8	50	Danny O'Quinn Jr. (R)	Roush Racing	Ford	49.302	182.548
9	5	Kyle Busch	Hendrick Motorsports	Chevrolet	49.306	182.533
10	16	Greg Biffle	Roush Racing	Ford	49.315	182.500
11	60	Carl Edwards**	Roush Racing	Ford	49.333	182.433
12	9	Kasey Kahne	Evernham Motorsports	Dodge	49.363	182.323
13	41	Reed Sorenson	Chip Ganassi Racing	Dodge	49.388	182.230
14	11	Paul Menard	Dale Earnhardt, Inc.	Chevrolet	49.403	182.175
15	21	Jeff Burton	Richard Childress Racing	Chevrolet	49.436	182.053
16	33	Tony Stewart	Kevin Harvick, Inc.	Chevrolet	49.448	182.009
17	29	Kevin Harvick	Richard Childress Racing	Chevrolet	49.449	182.005
18	20	Denny Hamlin	Joe Gibbs Racing	Chevrolet	49.470	181.928
19	06	Todd Kluever (R)	Roush Racing	Ford	49.472	181.921
20	8	Dale Earnhardt Jr.	Dale Earnhardt, Inc.	Chevrolet	49.500	181.818
21	77	Burney Lamar (R)	Kevin Harvick, Inc.	Chevrolet	49.503	181.807
22	36	Tim Sauter	McGill Motorsports	Chevrolet	49.542	181.663
23	27	David Green	Brewco Motorsports	Ford	49.587	181.499
24	32	Jason Leffler	Braun-Akins Racing	Chevrolet	49.597	181.462
25	88	Mark McFarland (R)	JR Motorsports	Chevrolet	49.632	181.334
26	57	Brian Vickers	Hendrick Motorsports	Chevrolet	49.640	181.305
27	1	Jason Keller	Phoenix Racing	Dodge	49.656	181.247
28	95	Steadman Marlin	Sadler Brothers Racing	Dodge	49.685	181.141
29	66	Ken Schrader	Brewco Motorsports	Ford	49.721	181.010
30	22	Kenny Wallace	ppc Racing	Ford	49.762	180.861
31	59	Stacy Compton	JTG Racing	Ford	49.790	180.759
32	35	Regan Smith	Team Resni Motorsports	Ford	49.841	180.574
33	38	A. J. Foyt IV (R)	Braun-Akins Racing	Dodge	49.880	180.433
34	47	Jon Wood	JTG Racing	Ford	49.895	180.378
35	25	Ashton Lewis	Team Rensi Motorsports	Ford	49.980	180.072
36	64	Jamie McMurray	Rusty Wallace, Inc.	Dodge	49.996	180.014
37	34	Paul Tracy	Frank Cicci Racing	Chevrolet	50.015	179.946
38	12	David Reutimann	FitzBradshaw Racing	Dodge	50.024	179.913
39	14	Tracy Hines (R)	FitzBradshaw Racing	Dodge	50.094	179.662
40	58	Donnie Neuenberger	MacDonald Motorsports	Chevrolet	50.224	179.197
41	4	Mark Green	Biagi Brothers Racing	Dodge	50.263	179.058
42	99	Michael Waltrip	Michael Waltrip Racing	Dodge	50.477	178.299
43	49	Steve Grissom*	Jay Robinson Racing	Ford	50.319	178.859
Failed to qualify, withdrew, or driver changes
44	0	Kertus Davis	Davis Motorsports	Chevrolet	49.747	180.915
45	01	Jay Sauter	Duesenberg & Leik Motorsports	Chevrolet	49.807	180.697
46	56	Kevin Lepage	Mac Hill Motorsports	Chevrolet	49.825	180.632
47	05	Chad Chaffin	Day Enterprise Racing	Chevrolet	50.025	179.910
48	62	Larry Hollenbeck	S.W.A.T Racing	Chevrolet	50.257	179.079
49	23	Chris Wimmer (R)	Keith Coleman Racing	Chevrolet	50.503	178.207
Official Starting grid

* – Steve Grissom made the field by owners points.

** – Carl Edwards had to go to the rear of the field for unapproved impound adjustments.

== Race ==
Pole sitter J. J. Yeley lead the first lap of the race. The first caution did not take long as it came out on lap 3 of the race while the moment of silence was happening for Dale Earnhardt when Ken Schrader crashed in turn 2 after he blew a left rear tire. The race would restart on lap 7. On lap 14, Clint Bowyer took the lead. On lap 15, Jeff Burton took the lead from his teammate. Bowyer and Burton swapped the lead on lap 16 and 17 before Kasey Kahne took it on lap 18. On lap 19, Greg Biffle took the lead. Jeff Burton took the lead on lap 26. On lap 29, Elliott Sadler's tire went flat but that did not bring out the caution. The second caution flew for the three car crash on the same lap in turn 4 involving Johnny Sauter, Reed Sorenson, and Aaron Fike. During the wreck, Joe Nemechek had no working brakes and flew by Sorenson who was stopped at over 100 miles an hour and almost hit Sorenson and a lot of other cars who were slowing down. NASCAR black flagged Nemechek and held him for one lap for aggressive driving. Nemechek in the process would get his brakes fixed. Kasey Kahne won the race off of pit road and he was the new race leader on the restart on lap 35. On lap 37, Brian Vickers attempted to take the lead from Kahne and lead that lap but could not make the pass. On lap 39, the third caution flew for another 3 car crash on the front stretch involving Paul Menard and Carl Edwards when Edwards spun down and collected A. J. Foyt IV. The wreck would produce a short red flag. The race would restart on lap 45. On lap 47, Dale Earnhardt Jr. took the lead. On lap 50, another 3 car crash occurred in turn 4 when Paul Tracy got turned by John Andretti while Joe Nemechek and Steadman Marlin crashed behind Tracy. The race would restart on lap 54. On lap 62, Greg Biffle took the lead. On lap 70, Jamie McMurray took the lead. On lap 74, Dale Earnhardt Jr. took the lead.

=== Final laps ===
With 45 laps to go, the 5th caution flew for debris when John Andretti's right front tire blew. Dale Earnhardt Jr. won the race off of pit road and lead the field to the restart with 40 laps to go. With 31 to go, the 6th caution flew for debris. The race would restart with 27 to go. But on that restart, Brian Vickers got hit from behind by Greg Biffle, Vickers went up into Biffle sending Biffle into the wall, and Vickers spun down into Kasey Kahne turning Kasey into the outside wall. Kahne came down and collected Regan Smith. The race restarted with 22 laps to go. But with 21 to go, the 8th caution flew for debris. The race got back underway with 18 to go. With 17 to go, David Green spun on the front stretch but no caution was thrown. With 13 to go, Tony Stewart took the lead from Dale Earnhardt Jr. On the same lap, Kyle Busch got hit from behind by Denny Hamlin and Busch's car came down into Jamie McMurray turning McMurray around and bringing out a caution, the 9th caution of the race. The race restarted with 10 to go. With 9 to go, the 10th caution would fly when David Reutimann blew a right front tire and hit the wall in turn 2. With 5 laps to go, the race would restart for the last time. On the restart, Dale Earnhardt Jr. attempted to pass Stewart for the lead. Michael Waltrip pulled to the outside of the two and made it three wide for the lead down the backstretch. After racing side by side for two laps, Waltrip passed Stewart for the lead with 3 to go but Stewart immediately took it back on the same lap. With 2 to go, Burney Lamar made a big charge from 9th to 2nd and was looking to win his first race in his 3rd Busch Series start. On the last lap, Clint Bowyer pulled to the inside of Lamar in turn 3 and Stewart pulled away. Off of turn 4, Lamar made contact with Stacy Compton and Compton spun around right in front of the field triggering a 11 car crash and bringing out the 11th and last caution of the race. During the wreck, some drivers like Denny Hamlin, Mark Green, and Tracy Hines plowed through and crashed hard into other cars. The wreck collected Jason Keller, Mark Green, Tracy Hines, Denny Hamlin, Kenny Wallace, Ashton Lewis, Tim Sauter, Reed Sorenson, Stacy Compton, Elliott Sadler, and Michael Waltrip. In the end, Tony Stewart won the Busch Series season opener at Daytona for the second year in a row. Despite finishing in second, Burney Lamar was not granted a post race interview by TNT. Clint Bowyer, Jon Wood, and Kevin Harvick rounded out the top 5 while Jason Leffler, Todd Kluever, J. J. Yeley, Reed Sorenson, and Mark Green rounded out the top 10.

== Race results ==
Pos	Car	Driver	Team	Manufacturer	Laps Run	Laps Led	Status	Points
1	33	Tony Stewart	Kevin Harvick, Inc.	Chevrolet	120	13	running	185
2	77	Burney Lamar (R)	Kevin Harvick, Inc.	Chevrolet	120	0	running	170
3	2	Clint Bowyer	Richard Childress Racing	Chevrolet	120	2	running	170
4	47	Jon Wood	JTG Racing	Ford	120	0	running	160
5	29	Kevin Harvick	Richard Childress Racing	Chevrolet	120	0	running	155
6	32	Jason Leffler	Braun-Akins Racing	Chevrolet	120	0	running	150
7	06	Todd Kluever (R)	Roush Racing	Ford	120	0	running	146
8	18	J. J. Yeley	Joe Gibbs Racing	Chevrolet	120	13	running	147
9	41	Reed Sorenson	Chip Ganassi Racing	Dodge	120	0	running	138
10	4	Mark Green	Biagi Brothers Racing	Dodge	120	0	running	134
11	1	Jason Keller	Phoenix Racing	Dodge	120	0	running	130
12	25	Ashton Lewis	Team Rensi Motorsports	Ford	120	0	running	127
13	22	Kenny Wallace	ppc Racing	Ford	120	0	running	124
14	20	Denny Hamlin	Joe Gibbs Racing	Chevrolet	120	0	running	121
15	99	Michael Waltrip	Michael Waltrip Racing	Dodge	120	0	running	118
16	64	Jamie McMurray	Rusty Wallace, Inc.	Dodge	120	4	running	120
17	8	Dale Earnhardt Jr.	Dale Earnhardt, Inc.	Chevrolet	120	48	running	122
18	50	Danny O'Quinn Jr. (R)	Roush Racing	Ford	120	0	running	109
19	36	Tim Sauter	McGill Motorsports	Chevrolet	120	0	running	106
20	14	Tracy Hines (R)	FitzBradshaw Racing	Dodge	120	0	running	103
21	49	Steve Grissom	Jay Robinson Racing	Ford	120	1	running	105
22	88	Mark McFarland (R)	JR Motorsports	Chevrolet	120	0	running	97
23	58	Donnie Neuenberger	MacDonald Motorsports	Chevrolet	120	0	running	94
24	34	Paul Tracy	Frank Cicci Racing	Chevrolet	120	0	running	91
25	5	Kyle Busch	Hendrick Motorsports	Chevrolet	120	0	running	88
26	35	Regan Smith	Team Rensi Motorsports	Ford	120	0	running	85
27	59	Stacy Compton	JTG Racing	Ford	119	0	running	82
28	90	Elliott Sadler	Robert Yates Racing	Ford	119	0	running	79
29	12	David Reutimann	FitzBradshaw Racing	Dodge	111	0	crash	76
30	21	Jeff Burton	Richard Childress Racing	Chevrolet	101	9	engine	78
31	16	Greg Biffle	Roush Racing	Ford	94	15	crash	75
32	57	Brian Vickers	Hendrick Motorsports	Chevrolet	93	1	crash	72
33	9	Kasey Kahne	Evernham Motorsports	Dodge	93	14	crash	69
34	10	John Andretti (R)	ppc Racing	Ford	92	0	running	61
35	00	Johnny Sauter	Haas CNC Racing	Chevrolet	89	0	running	58
36	66	Ken Schrader	Brewco Motorsports	Ford	89	0	running	55
37	27	David Green	Brewco Motorsports	Ford	81	0	running	52
38	11	Paul Menard	Dale Earnhardt, Inc.	Chevrolet	78	0	running	49
39	60	Carl Edwards	Roush Racing	Ford	65	0	running	46
40	87	Joe Nemechek	NEMCO Motorsports	Chevrolet	51	0	crash	43
41	95	Steadman Marlin	Sadler Brothers Racing	Dodge	49	0	crash	40
42	38	A. J. Foyt IV (R)	Braun-Akins Racing	Dodge	39	0	crash	37
43	43	Aaron Fike	Curb Agajanian Performance Group	Dodge	28	0	crash	34
Official Race results

Previous race: 2005 Ford 300	NASCAR Busch Series; 2006 season	Next race: {{{Next_race}}}
