= Arnold Lake =

Lake in Otsego County, New York, USA

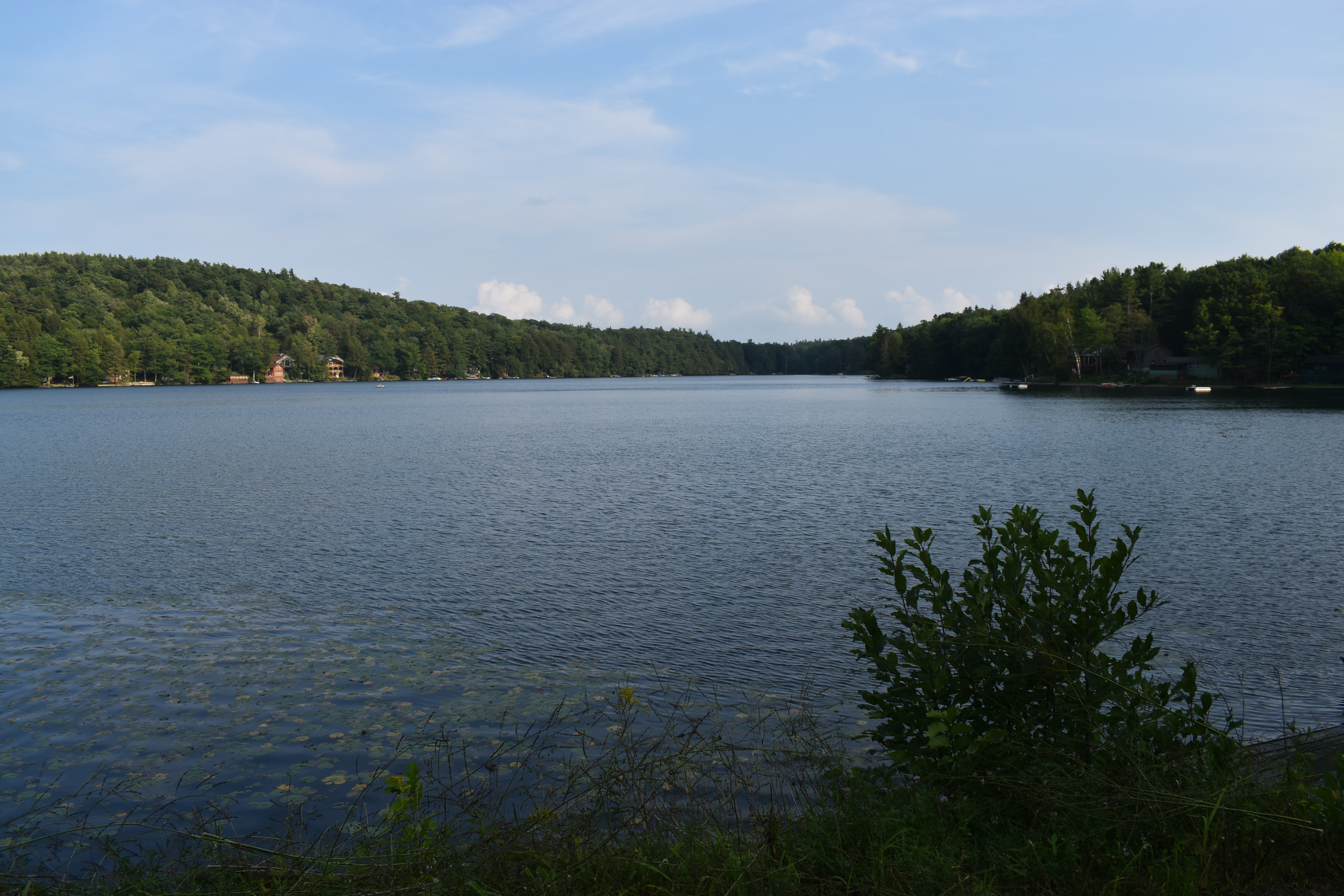

- Location of Arnold Lake within New York State
- Location: Otsego County, New York
- Coordinates: 42°36′41″N 75°00′16″W
- Primary outflows: Spring Brook
- Surface area: 69 acres (0.108 mi^{2}; 0.28 km^{2})
- Surface elevation: 1,775 feet (541 m)
- Settlements: Milford, New York

Arnold Lake is a small lake located west-northwest of the Village of Milford in the Town of Hartwick in Otsego County, New York. The lake drains south via Spring Brook which flows into Goodyear Lake by Portlandville.
