= Crumhorn Lake =

Lake in Otsego County, New York, United States

- Location of Crumhorn Lake within New York State Crumhorn Lake (the United States)
- Location: Otsego County, New York
- Coordinates: 42°33′28″N 74°55′18″W
- Surface area: 62 acres (25 ha)
- Surface elevation: 1,831 feet (558 m)
- Settlements: Portlandville, New York

Crumhorn Lake is a lake located northeast of the hamlet of Portlandville in the Town of Milford in Otsego County, New York.
