= Spring Brook (Susquehanna River tributary) =

- Location of the mouth of Spring Brook

Location
- Country: United States
- State: New York
- Region: Central New York Region
- County: Otsego

Physical characteristics
- Source: Arnold Lake
  - location: Milford, New York
  - coordinates: 42°36′43″N 75°00′32″W
  - elevation: 1,775 ft (541 m)
- Mouth: Goodyear Lake
  - location: Portlandville, New York
  - coordinates: 42°31′43″N 74°58′20″W
  - elevation: 1,138 ft (347 m)

Spring Brook is a river located in central Otsego County, New York. The creek drains Arnold Lake and flows south before converging with Goodyear Lake, which is an impoundment of the Susquehanna River, by Portlandville, New York.
