= Armando Fitz =

American racing team owner

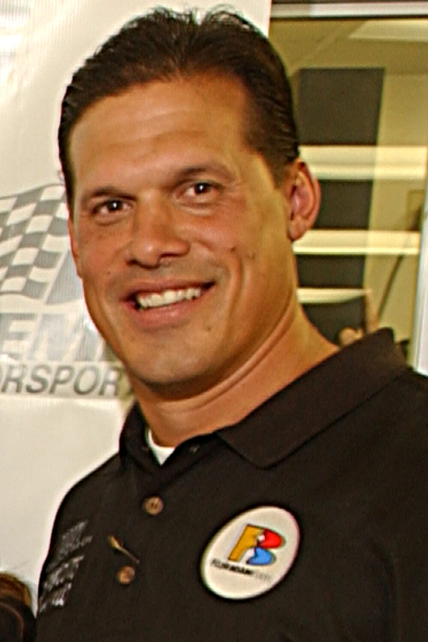
Armando Fitz in 2004

Armando Fitz was an owner of Fitz Racing, a NASCAR Nationwide Series team.

A native of Nashville, Tennessee, Fitz graduated from Vanderbilt University in 1987 with a degree in Business and Human Development. While attending Vanderbilt, he played linebacker for the Commodore football squad for four years. He and his wife Mimi have four children.

Fitz began his career in racing by leading the motorsports division of creative sports before moving to SABCO in 1994. In 1999, he created a University of Tennessee car to celebrate the team's NCAA football championship and also spearheaded programs for the Coor's Light entry that included paint schemes featuring John Wayne and Brooks and Dunn.

Fitz's career as an owner began at the end of the 2000 season when he and Mimi purchased Felix Sabates' Busch team. Running a partial schedule, Fitz directed his team to a 42nd-place finish in the owner's points standings. His car finished in the top 20 in 14 of the 27 races that year, including a fifth-place finish at Phoenix International Raceway and an eight-place showing at The Milwaukee Mile.

Following the 2001 season, the Fitzes teamed with Pro Football Hall of Fame member and FOX broadcaster Terry Bradshaw to create FitzBradshaw Racing. The partnership was strengthened as four sponsors signed on for the 2002 season, allowing FBR to field a car for the entire Busch Series schedule. The team tallied five top 10 finishes on the year, including a second-place showing at Kansas Speedway, to finish 21st in the team owner points.

In 2003, the momentum continued as FitzBradshaw Racing added a second car part way through the season after gaining the Navy as a sponsor. The No. 12 team improved to 18th in the team owner points while the No. 14 finished 42nd, the best showing among teams with 12 starts or less.

The 2004 season proved to be even more successful as Supercuts, Hot Tamales, Jani-King and the Navy returned as sponsors. Both FBR cars finished in the Top 20 in owners points as the No. 14 placed 14th with Casey Atwood, and the No. 12 completed the season 20th with Tim Fedewa.

Following the 2004 season, Fitz announced that FBR was growing again with the addition of a third team sponsored by Cottman Transmissions, Jani King and Goulds Pumps. With the growth, Fitz also strengthened his team's ties to its roots as he announced an alliance with Chip Ganassi Racing with Felix Sabates, which allowed for full technical and engineering support. The team also switched car manufacturers, moving from Chevrolet and the Monte Carlo to Dodge's new Charger, in the process becoming the only Busch Series team fully supported by the manufacturer.

Also Armando Fitz is Cousin to George Gomez, one of the top amateur golfers in the state of Tennessee and California.
