= Jarit Johnson =

American racing driver (born 1979)

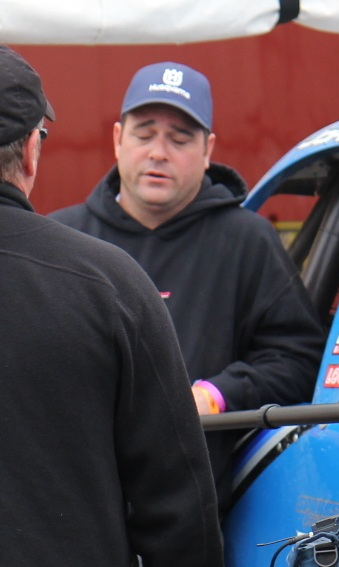
- Johnson being interviewed in 2013
- Born: January 16, 1979 (age 47); El Cajon, California, U.S.
- Awards: 2013 TORC Off Road Series Rookie of the Year

NASCAR O'Reilly Auto Parts Series career
- 4 races run over 3 years
- 2010 position: 128th
- Best finish: 119th (2009)
- First race: 2008 Kroger On Track for the Cure 250 (Memphis)
- Last race: 2010 Federated Auto Parts 300 (Nashville)
| Wins | Top tens | Poles |
|---|---|---|
| 0 | 0 | 0 |

NASCAR FedEx Freight Truck Series career
- 2 races run over 1 year
- Best finish: 68th (2005)
- First race: 2005 Cheerios Betty Crocker 200 (Richmond)
- Last race: 2005 Kroger 200 (Martinsville)
| Wins | Top tens | Poles |
|---|---|---|
| 0 | 0 | 0 |
- Statistics up to date as of November 17, 2013.

Jarit Gene Johnson (born January 16, 1979) is an American competitive racing driver. He is the brother of NASCAR champion Jimmie Johnson and a former NASCAR competitor. He currently drives a Pro 2 Trophy Truck in the TORC: The Off Road Championship series.

== Racing career ==
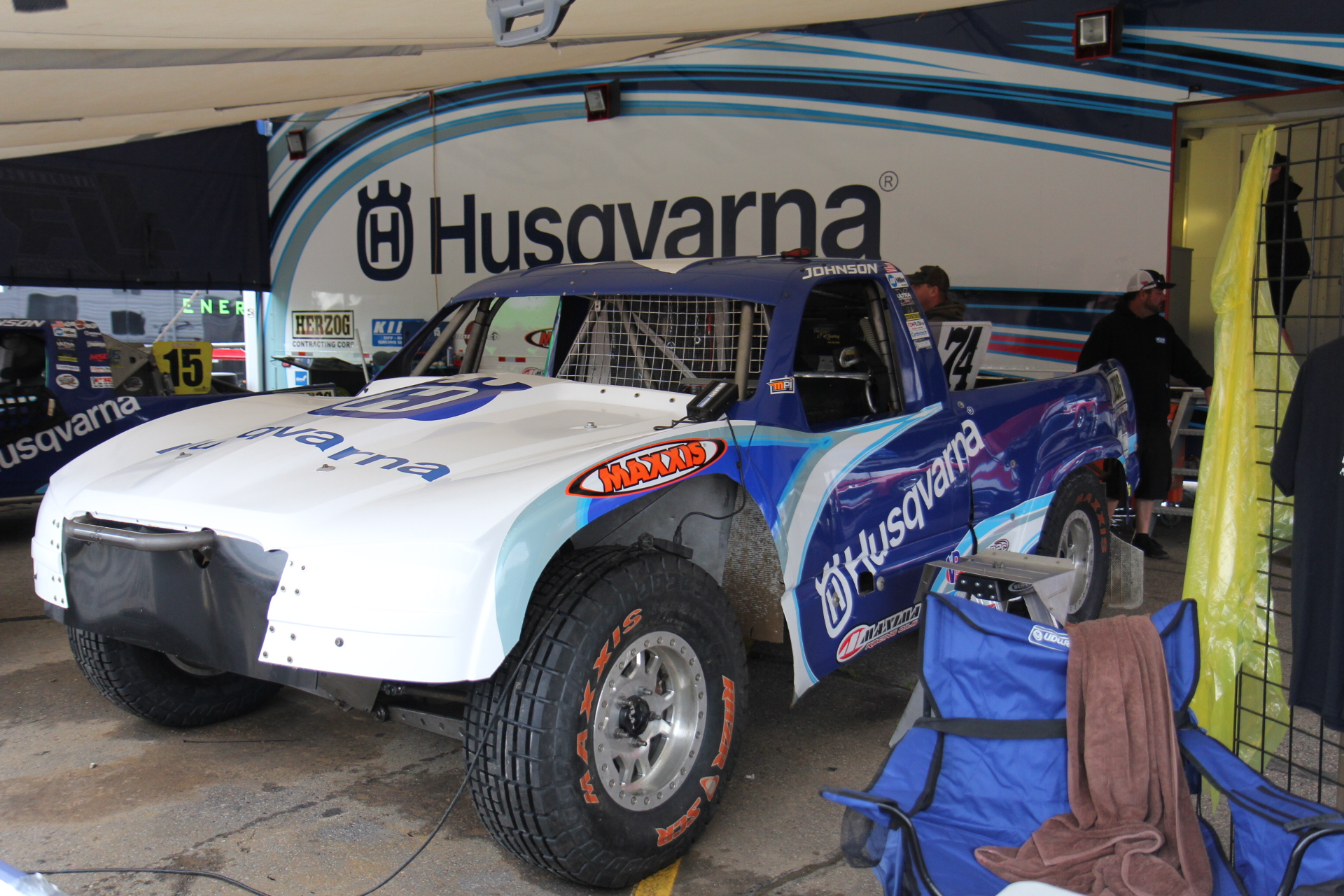
Johnson's Pro-2 TORC truck in the pits at Crandon

After making a name for himself in off-road competition, Johnson made his debut in NASCAR competition in 2005, competing in two events in the Craftsman Truck Series in the No. 08 for Green Light Racing with a best finish of 25th. Johnson made his debut in the Nationwide Series in 2008, driving the No. 22 Dodge for Fitz Motorsports. In 2009, he attempted to qualify for four Nationwide events for SK Motorsports in their No. 07 and No. 44 cars. Johnson also started the 2009 season competing part-time in the Camping World East Series in the No. 23 for Trail Motorsports (the successor team to Fitz), but the team folded due to lack of sponsorship after just one race, and as a result, Johnson formed his own team (initially running Trail's No. 23 before switching to the No. 74) which he would drive for in his races that season instead as well as the season-opener in 2010 at Greenville-Pickens Speedway. His final start in NASCAR came in the 2010 Nationwide race at Nashville in the No. 87 for NEMCO Motorsports, where he finished 31st.

After being unable to find a NASCAR ride in 2011, Johnson returned to off-road racing in 2012, where he has remained ever since. Competing in the Traxxas TORC Series Pro-2 class in 2013, he was named the series' Rookie of the Year. The series was renamed as TORC: The Off-Road Championship. He continued in the Pro 2 class and finished sixth in the 2014 points. Johnson raced in selected TORC Pro 2 events in 2015 finishing sixth in the points.

== Personal life ==
Johnson was born in El Cajon, California, on January 16, 1979, to Catherine and Gary Johnson. He has two brothers. Jimmie, a seven-time NASCAR Cup Series champion, is the oldest of the three brothers. Jessie, the youngest, also competes in professional off-road races (as of 2015).

== Motorsports career results ==
=== NASCAR ===
(key) (Bold – Pole position awarded by qualifying time. Italics – Pole position earned by points standings or practice time. * – Most laps led.)

==== Nationwide Series ====
NASCAR Nationwide Series results
| Year | Team | No. | Make | 1 | 2 | 3 | 4 | 5 | 6 | 7 | 8 | 9 | 10 | 11 | 12 | 13 | 14 | 15 | 16 | 17 | 18 | 19 | 20 | 21 | 22 | 23 | 24 | 25 | 26 | 27 | 28 | 29 | 30 | 31 | 32 | 33 | 34 | 35 | NNSC | Pts | Ref |
|---|---|---|---|---|---|---|---|---|---|---|---|---|---|---|---|---|---|---|---|---|---|---|---|---|---|---|---|---|---|---|---|---|---|---|---|---|---|---|---|---|---|
| 2008 | Fitz Motorsports | 22 | Dodge | DAY | CAL | LVS | ATL | BRI | NSH | TEX | PHO | MXC | TAL | RCH | DAR | CLT | DOV | NSH | KEN | MLW | NHA | DAY | CHI | GTY | IRP | CGV | GLN | MCH | BRI | CAL | RCH | DOV | KAN | CLT | MEM; 32 | TEX | PHO | HOM | 128th | 67 | |
| 2009 | SK Motorsports | 07 | Chevy | DAY | CAL | LVS | BRI | TEX | NSH | PHO | TAL | RCH | DAR | CLT | DOV | NSH | KEN | MLW | NHA | DAY | CHI | GTY | IRP | IOW | GLN | MCH | BRI | CGV | ATL | RCH | DOV; 33 | KAN; 34 | | | | | | | 119th | 125 | |
| 2009 | SK Motorsports | 44 | Chevy | | | | | | | | | | | | | | | | | | | | | | | | | | | | | | CAL; DNQ | CLT | MEM; DNQ | TEX | PHO | HOM | 119th | 125 | |
| 2010 | NEMCO Motorsports | 87 | Chevy | DAY | CAL | LVS | BRI | NSH | PHO | TEX | TAL | RCH | DAR | DOV | CLT | NSH; 31 | KEN | ROA | NHA | DAY | CHI | GTY | IRP | IOW | GLN | MCH | BRI | CGV | ATL | RCH | DOV | KAN | CAL | CLT | GTY | TEX | PHO | HOM | 128th | 70 | |

==== Craftsman Truck Series ====
NASCAR Craftsman Truck Series results
| Year | Team | No. | Make | 1 | 2 | 3 | 4 | 5 | 6 | 7 | 8 | 9 | 10 | 11 | 12 | 13 | 14 | 15 | 16 | 17 | 18 | 19 | 20 | 21 | 22 | 23 | 24 | 25 | NCTC | Pts | Ref |
|---|---|---|---|---|---|---|---|---|---|---|---|---|---|---|---|---|---|---|---|---|---|---|---|---|---|---|---|---|---|---|---|
| 2005 | Green Light Racing | 08 | Chevy | DAY | CAL | ATL | MAR | GTY | MFD | CLT | DOV | TEX | MCH | MLW | KAN | KEN | MEM | IRP | NSH | BRI | RCH; 25 | NHA | LVS | MAR; 28 | ATL | TEX | PHO | HOM | 68th | 167 | |

==== K&N Pro Series East ====
NASCAR K&N Pro Series East results
| Year | Team | No. | Make | 1 | 2 | 3 | 4 | 5 | 6 | 7 | 8 | 9 | 10 | 11 | NKNPSEC | Pts | Ref |
|---|---|---|---|---|---|---|---|---|---|---|---|---|---|---|---|---|---|
| 2009 | Trail Motorsports | 23 | Dodge | GRE; 24 | | | | | | | | | | | 17th | 761 | |
| 2009 | Jarit Johnson Racing | 23 | Chevy | | TRI; 26 | IOW; 14 | SBO | GLN | | | | | | | 17th | 761 | |
| 2009 | Jarit Johnson Racing | 74 | Chevy | | | | | | NHA; 22 | TMP; 15 | ADI | LRP | NHA; 16 | DOV; 10 | 17th | 761 | |
| 2010 | Jarit Johnson Racing | 74 | Chevy | GRE; 12 | SBO | IOW | MAR | NHA | LRP | LEE | JFC | NHA | DOV | | 52nd | 127 | |

==== Camping World West Series ====
NASCAR Camping World West Series results
| Year | Team | No. | Make | 1 | 2 | 3 | 4 | 5 | 6 | 7 | 8 | 9 | 10 | 11 | 12 | 13 | NCWWSC | Pts | Ref |
|---|---|---|---|---|---|---|---|---|---|---|---|---|---|---|---|---|---|---|---|
| 2008 | Midgley Racing | 09 | Chevy | AAS | PHO; 14 | CTS | IOW | CNS | SON | IRW | DCS | EVG | MMP | IRW | AMP | AAS | 58th | 121 | |
| 2009 | Jarit Johnson Racing | 74 | Chevy | CTS | AAS | PHO | MAD | IOW | DCS | SON | IRW | PIR | MMP | CNS | IOW; 18 | AAS | 62nd | 109 | |

=== ARCA Re/Max Series ===
(key) (Bold – Pole position awarded by qualifying time. Italics – Pole position earned by points standings or practice time. * – Most laps led.)

ARCA Re/Max Series results
| Year | Team | No. | Make | 1 | 2 | 3 | 4 | 5 | 6 | 7 | 8 | 9 | 10 | 11 | 12 | 13 | 14 | 15 | 16 | 17 | 18 | 19 | 20 | 21 | 22 | 23 | ARMC | Pts | Ref |
|---|---|---|---|---|---|---|---|---|---|---|---|---|---|---|---|---|---|---|---|---|---|---|---|---|---|---|---|---|---|
| 2005 | Gerhart Racing | 5 | Chevy | DAY | NSH | SLM | KEN | TOL | LAN | MIL | POC | MCH | KAN | KEN | BLN | POC | GTW | LER | NSH | MCH; 35 | ISF | TOL | DSF | CHI | SLM | TAL | 165th | | |
| 2008 | Fox Motorsports | 38 | Chevy | DAY | SLM | IOW | KAN | CAR | KEN | TOL | POC | MCH | CAY | KEN | BLN | POC; 29 | NSH | ISF | DSF | CHI | SLM | NJE | TAL | TOL | | | 136th | 85 | |
