= Goodyear Lake =

- Location within New York Goodyear Lake (the United States)
- Location: Otsego County, New York
- Coordinates: 42°30′35″N 74°59′15″W
- Type: Reservoir
- Primary inflows: Susquehanna River, Spring Brook
- Primary outflows: Susquehanna River
- Basin countries: United States
- Surface area: 234 acres (0.366 mi^{2}; 95 ha)
- Average depth: 14 feet (4.3 m)
- Max. depth: 30 feet (9.1 m)
- Shore length^{1}: 9.7 miles (15.6 km)
- Surface elevation: 1,138 feet (347 m)
- Settlements: Portlandville, Cliffside
- ^{1} Shore length is not a well-defined measure.

Goodyear Lake is a man-made lake created by the building of the Colliersville Dam. The lake is located southwest of the hamlet of Portlandville in the Town of Milford in Otsego County, New York.

== Fishing ==
Fish species present in the lake are bluegill, black bullhead, largemouth bass, chain pickerel, pumpkinseed sunfish, rock bass, smallmouth bass, walleye, and yellow perch. The lake is accessed by a state-owned carry down boat launch off NY 28 in Portlandville and one off Silliman Cove Road with parking for 15 cars, as well as various areas to shore fish. There is also hotel accommodations off NY 28 on the west shore of the lake.
