= Milford, New York =

- Town
- Logo

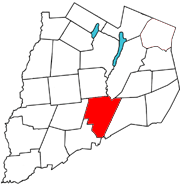
- Otsego County map with the Town of Milford in red
- Coordinates: 42.5495°N 74.9910°W
- Country: United States
- State: New York
- County: Otsego
- Organized: 1796

Area
  - Total: 47.15 sq mi (122.12 km^{2})
  - Land: 46.12 sq mi (119.45 km^{2})
  - Water: 1.03 sq mi (2.67 km^{2})
- Elevation: 1,207 ft (368 m)

Population (2010)
  - Total: 3,044
  - Estimate (2016): 2,907
  - Density: 63.0/sq mi (24.34/km^{2})
- Time zone: UTC-5 (Eastern (EST))
  - Summer (DST): UTC-4 (EDT)
- ZIP code: 13807
- Area code: 607
- FIPS code: 36-077-47240
- Website: www.townofmilfordny.gov

Milford is a town in Otsego County, New York, United States. The population was 3,044 at the 2010 census. Within town is the village of Milford. The town is northeast of the City of Oneonta.

== History ==
The first settler arrived around 1770, but few people followed until after the Revolutionary War.

The town was formed from the Town of Unadilla in 1796 as the Town of Suffrage, and the name was changed to Milford in 1800.

== Geography ==
According to the United States Census Bureau, the town has a total area of 47.2 square miles (122.2 km^{2}), of which 46.1 square miles (119.4 km^{2}) is land and 1.1 square miles (2.8 km^{2}) (2.27%) is water.

The Susquehanna River flows south through the eastern part of Milford, receiving the inflow of Cherry Valley Creek.

New York State Route 28 is a north-south highway through the eastern part of the town. New York State Route 166 intersects NY-28 at Milford village, and New York State Route 7 intersects NY-28 in the southern part of Milford. NY-28 intersects Interstate 88 near the southern town line.

== Demographics ==
Historical population
Census	Pop.	Note	%±
1820	2,505		—
1830	1,968		−21.4%
1840	2,095		6.5%
1850	2,227		6.3%
1860	2,210		−0.8%
1870	2,301		4.1%
1880	2,319		0.8%
1890	2,051		−11.6%
1900	2,007		−2.1%
1910	1,825		−9.1%
1920	1,616		−11.5%
1930	1,635		1.2%
1940	1,666		1.9%
1950	1,913		14.8%
1960	2,055		7.4%
1970	2,485		20.9%
1980	2,685		8.0%
1990	2,845		6.0%
2000	2,938		3.3%
2010	3,044		3.6%
2016 (est.)	2,907	▼	−4.5%
U.S. Decennial Census

As of the census of 2000, there were 2,938 people, 1,207 households, and 813 families residing in the town. The population density was 63.7 inhabitants per square mile (24.6/km^{2}). There were 1,575 housing units at an average density of 34.2 per square mile (13.2/km^{2}). The racial makeup of the town was 97.52% White, 0.71% Black or African American, 0.31% Native American, 0.58% Asian, 0.10% from other races, and 0.78% from two or more races. Hispanic or Latino people of any race were 1.91% of the population.

There were 1,207 households, out of which 28.4% had children under the age of 18 living with them, 52.1% were married couples living together, 10.7% had a female householder with no husband present, and 32.6% were non-families. 25.4% of all households were made up of individuals, and 11.3% had someone living alone who was 65 years of age or older. The average household size was 2.38 and the average family size was 2.84.

In the town, the population was spread out, with 23.1% under the age of 18, 6.2% from 18 to 24, 26.7% from 25 to 44, 29.0% from 45 to 64, and 15.0% who were 65 years of age or older. The median age was 41 years. For every 100 females, there were 93.7 males. For every 100 females age 18 and over, there were 91.4 males.

The median income for a household in the town was $36,803, and the median income for a family was $43,516. Males had a median income of $31,108 versus $23,015 for females. The per capita income for the town was $17,722. About 9.3% of families and 13.6% of the population were below the poverty line, including 18.4% of those under age 18 and 9.5% of those age 65 or over.

== Communities and locations in the Town of Milford ==
- Burying Ground Hill – an elevation by Edson Corners
- Cliffside – a hamlet in the southeastern part of the town, on the east shore of Goodyear Lake
- Colliersville – a hamlet in the southern part of the town on NY-7
- Cooperstown Junction – a hamlet in the southern part of the town on NY-7
- Crumhorn Lake – a small lake by the eastern town line on Crummhorn Mountain
- Crumhorn Mountain – a highground in the southeastern part of Milford
- Crummhorn Mountain Wildlife Management Area – a conservation area on Crummhorn Mountain
- Dutch Hill – an elevation north of Milford Center
- Edson Corners – a location west of Milford village at the junction of County Highways 44 and 46
- Goodyear Lake – a lake in the southeastern part of the town
- Lane Hill – an elevation east of Edson Corners
- Milford – The Village of Milford is on NY-28 at the intersection of NY-166 and County Highway 44 in the northeastern part of the town.
- Milford Center – a hamlet in the southern part of the town on NY-28
- Portlandville – a hamlet east of Milford Center on NY-28
- Red Ridge Hill – an elevation southwest of Milford
- Saddlebag Lake – a small lake near the Susquehanna River and Portlandville

== Notable people ==
- Paul Wolfe, NASCAR Championship-winning crew chief
