= Tracy Hines =

American racing driver

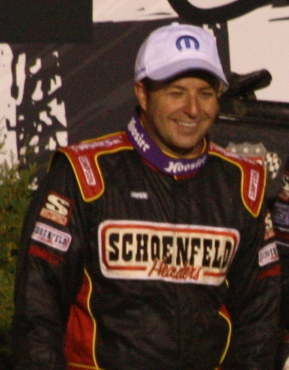
- Hines in 2012
- Born: May 1, 1972 (age 54); New Castle, Indiana, U.S.
- Achievements: 2000 USAC Silver Crown Series Champion; 2002 USAC National Sprint Car Series Champion; 2015 USAC National Midget Series Champion
- Awards: 2001 National Midget Driver of the Year; USAC Triple Crown Winner; Inducted into the National Midget Hall of Fame 2022; Inducted into the USAC Hall of Fame 2023; Inducted into the National Sprint Car Hall of Fame 2024

NASCAR O'Reilly Auto Parts Series career
- 17 races run over 3 years
- Best finish: 74th (2004)
- First race: 2004 O'Reilly 300 (Texas)
- Last race: 2006 New England 200 (New Hampshire)
Wins	Top tens	Poles
0	0	0

NASCAR FedEx Freight Truck Series career
- 53 races run over 4 years
- 2013 position: 56th
- Best finish: 18th (2004)
- First race: 2003 Power Stroke Diesel 200 (IRP)
- Last race: 2013 Mudsummer Classic (Eldora)
Wins	Top tens	Poles
0	3	0
- Statistics up to date as of July 24, 2013.

Tracy Lee Hines (born May 1, 1972) is an American professional racing driver. He was the 2000 USAC Silver Crown Champion, 2002 USAC National Sprint Car Champion, and the 2015 USAC National Midget Champion. He is currently the Competition Director for the ThorSport truck team in NASCAR.

== NASCAR ==
Hines made his first attempt at a Busch race in 2000, when he attempted to qualify for the Cheez-It 200 in a car owned by Jimmy Spencer. He did not make the field.

=== 2003 ===
Hines broke into NASCAR career in 2003, when he and NASCAR Craftsman Truck owner Jim Smith came to an agreement with Hines to run five Truck Series races for him in the later portions of 2003.

Hines' career started at Indianapolis Raceway Park (IRP). Hines qualified 30th in the No. 27 Dodge Motorsports Dodge Ram and had just made it into the top-ten when he wrecked and crashed into the wall, finishing 32nd. At the next race at Texas Motor Speedway, he qualified fourth, and ran in the top-15 all day, coming home with an eleventh-place finish. Hines ran his last two races that season at Martinsville Speedway and Phoenix International Raceway. At both races, Hines qualified the No. 7 in 22nd place, and finished 13th.

=== 2004 ===
In 2004, Tommy Baldwin signed Hines to drive three races for the Hungry Drivers program, a Busch Series competition to see who would drive his No. 6 Ragú Dodge Intrepid that season. In his debut at Texas, he started 14th and finished 20th despite a late spin. After a 25th at Talladega Superspeedway, Hines had his best finish of the year, a 17th at Michigan International Speedway.

Hines continued to run in the Truck Series, replacing Matt Crafton in the No. 88 Menards Chevrolet Silverado for ThorSport Racing, competing for NASCAR Rookie of the Year. He finished 20th, 16th and 29th in the first three races, before posting a fifth-place finish at Mansfield Motorsports Speedway. Starting at Texas, Tracy Hines had a streak of eight straight top-17 finishes, capped off by a ninth at IRP. He also led two laps at Gateway. Hines finished off the 2004 season, with a pair of 13ths and earned an 18th-place points finish.

=== 2005 ===
In 2005, the No. 88 had gone back to Crafton, and Paul Wolfe was in the No. 6 Hellmann's Dodge for 2005. Despite a lack of sponsorship, ThorSport fielded a second truck for Hines, the No. 13. In 23 races, he finished in the top-20 only seven times. He was released with two races to go in the season.

Hines drove one race in 2005 the No. 43 Channellock Dodge for The Curb Agajanian Performance Group at California, where he started 26th and finishing 36th after a late crash. After Wolfe was released from the No. 6, Evernham Motorsports, who now owned the car, hired Hines to drive at The Milwaukee Mile, where he started ninth and finished nineteenth. He also ran at IRP in the No. 6, starting fifth and finishing 24th. Later in the season at Texas, he attempted a Busch race for Glynn Motorsports, however the No. 92 Ultra Comp Trailers Dodge crashed in practice and withdrew.

=== 2006 ===
Hines was to have signed to drive the No. 92 Glynn Motorsports Dodge in the Busch Series, but the team dissolved. Instead, he signed to drive the No. 14 Dodge Charger for FitzBradshaw Racing, with sponsorship from TakeMeOn Vacation, Bluegrass, and JaniKing. Hines was teamed with fellow hoosier Joel Kauffman. After an aborted attempt at Rookie of the Year, Hines resigned from Fitz Bradshaw Racing. Hines planned to spend the rest of this season racing sprint cars.

== Return to open-wheel ==
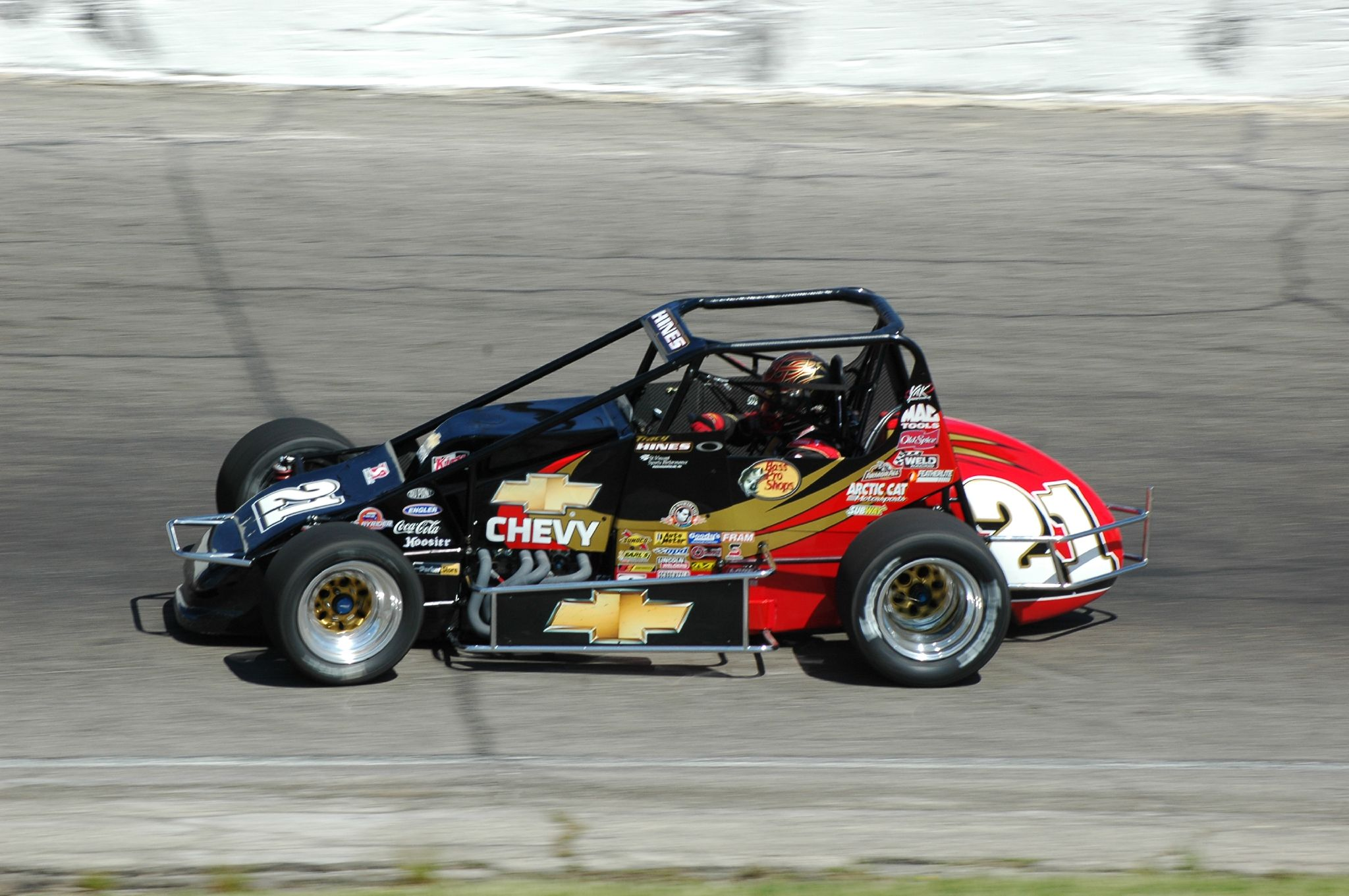
2008 Sprint Car

=== 2007 ===
Hines raced USAC sprint, midget, and Silver Crown cars for Tony Stewart Racing. He sustained a fractured pelvis and left femur, and dislocated right knee in an off-road motorcycle wreck on April 30, 2007.

=== 2008 ===
Hines recorded the fastest ever midget car lap on an asphalt quarter mile at Slinger Super Speedway when he ran a 10.845 second qualifying lap on May 17, 2008.

=== 2009–2013 ===
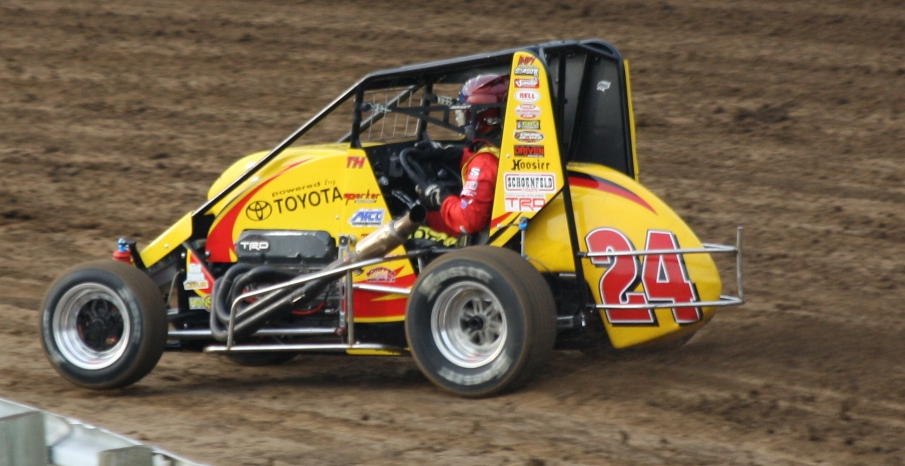
Hines' 2013 USAC Midget Car

Hines continued his career in the USAC ranks for several years before returning to NASCAR competition in 2013, driving in the Camping World Truck Series for ThorSport Racing in the inaugural Mudsummer Classic on the dirt at Eldora Speedway. Hines finished 13th in the event after starting in 16th.

== Awards and honors ==
Hines was inducted into the National Midget Auto Racing Hall of Fame in 2022.

== Motorsports career results ==
=== NASCAR ===
(key) (Bold – Pole position awarded by qualifying time. Italics – Pole position earned by points standings or practice time. * – Most laps led.)

==== Busch Series ====
NASCAR Busch Series results
Year	Team	No.	Make	1	2	3	4	5	6	7	8	9	10	11	12	13	14	15	16	17	18	19	20	21	22	23	24	25	26	27	28	29	30	31	32	33	34	35	NBSC	Pts	Ref
2000	Spencer Motor Ventures	12	Chevy	DAY	CAR	LVS	ATL	DAR	BRI; DNQ	TEX	NSV	TAL	CAL	RCH	NHA	CLT	DOV	SBO	MYB	GLN	MLW	NZH	PPR	GTY	IRP	MCH	BRI	DAR	RCH	DOV	CLT	CAR	MEM	PHO	HOM				N/A	-	
2004	Tommy Baldwin Racing	6	Dodge	DAY	CAR	LVS	DAR	BRI	TEX; 20	NSH	TAL; 25	CAL	GTY	RCH	NZH	CLT	DOV	NSH	KEN	MLW	DAY	CHI	NHA	PPR	IRP	MCH; 17	BRI	CAL	RCH	DOV	KAN	CLT	MEM	ATL	PHO	DAR	HOM		74th	303	
2005	Curb-Agajanian Motorsports	43	Dodge	DAY	CAL; 36	MXC	LVS	ATL	NSH	BRI	TEX	PHO	TAL	DAR	RCH	CLT	DOV	NSH	KEN																				85th	252	
2005	Evernham Motorsports	6	Dodge																	MLW; 16	DAY	CHI	NHA	PPR	GTY	IRP; 24	GLN	MCH	BRI	CAL	RCH	DOV	KAN	CLT	MEM				85th	252	
2005	Glynn Motorsports	92	Dodge																																	TEX; DNQ	PHO	HOM	85th	252	
2006	FitzBradshaw Racing	14	Dodge	DAY; 20	CAL; 33	MXC	LVS; 38	ATL; 41	BRI; 13	TEX; 30	NSH	PHO; 43																											55th	752	
2006	FitzBradshaw Racing	12	Dodge										TAL; 25	RCH	DAR	CLT	DOV	NSH	KEN	MLW	DAY; 29	CHI; 41	NHA; 34	MAR	GTY	IRP	GLN	MCH	BRI	CAL	RCH	DOV	KAN	CLT	MEM	TEX	PHO	HOM	55th	752	

==== Camping World Truck Series ====
NASCAR Camping World Truck Series results
Year	Team	No.	Make	1	2	3	4	5	6	7	8	9	10	11	12	13	14	15	16	17	18	19	20	21	22	23	24	25	NCWTC	Pts	Ref
2003	Ultra Motorsports	27	Dodge	DAY	DAR	MMR	MAR	CLT	DOV	TEX	MEM	MLW	KAN	KEN	GTW	MCH	IRP; 32	NSH	BRI	RCH	NHA	CAL	LVS	SBO					54th	445	
2003	Ultra Motorsports	7	Dodge																						TEX; 11	MAR; 13	PHO; 13	HOM	54th	445	
2004	ThorSport Racing	88	Chevy	DAY; 20	ATL; 16	MAR; 29	MFD; 5	CLT; 34	DOV; 21	TEX; 16	MEM; 14	MLW; 14	KAN; 14	KEN; 17	GTW; 15	MCH; 16	IRP; 9	NSH; 22	BRI; 21	RCH; 19	NHA; 30	LVS; 18	CAL; 31	TEX; 19	MAR; 35	PHO; 34	DAR; 13	HOM; 13	18th	2604	
2005	ThorSport Racing	13	Chevy	DAY; 22	CAL; 33	ATL; 16	MAR; 13	GTY; 25	MFD; 27	CLT; 18	DOV; 25	TEX; 26	MCH; 36	MLW; 32	KAN; 19	KEN; 20	MEM; 16	IRP; 32	NSH; 29	BRI; 24	RCH; 5	NHA; 19	LVS; 36	MAR; 17	ATL; 26	TEX; 35	PHO	HOM	25th	2108	
2013	ThorSport Racing	13	Toyota	DAY	MAR	CAR	KAN	CLT	DOV	TEX	KEN	IOW	ELD; 13	POC	MCH	BRI	MSP	IOW	CHI	LVS	TAL	MAR	TEX	PHO	HOM				56th	31	

^{*} Season still in progress
^{1} Ineligible for series points
