= Joel Kauffman =

American racing driver

- Born: December 9, 1985 (age 40); Mooresville, North Carolina, U.S.
- Achievements: 2002 Sunoco Super Series Champion
- Awards: 2001 Kendall Late Model Series Rookie of the Year 2003 USAR Hooters Pro Cup Northern Division Rookie of the Year

NASCAR O'Reilly Auto Parts Series career
- 18 races run over 2 years
- Best finish: 57th (2006)
- First race: 2005 Kroger 200 (IRP)
- Last race: 2006 AT&T 250 (Milwaukee)
Wins	Top tens	Poles
0	0	0
- Statistics up to date as of July 24, 2012.

Joel Kauffman (born December 9, 1985) is an American stock car racing driver. He was the driver of the No. 12 Supercuts Dodge Charger for FitzBradshaw Racing in the NASCAR Busch Series.

== Racing career ==
Kauffman began his racing career at the age of ten when he began racing mini-sprints in Indiana. When he was twelve, he became the youngest driver in the National Modified Midget Association to have finished in the top-three in the points standings. In the year 2000, he began running asphalt races, and won the CRA Kendall Late Model Series Rookie of the Year award in 2001 and won the CRA Sunoco Super Series championship the very next year.

In 2003, Kauffman ran the United Speed Alliance Racing Series, and won Rookie of the Year that season. He eventually caught the eye of FitzBradshaw Racing. He made his NASCAR debut at the Kroger 200 in 2005, starting 26th and finishing 25th. He ran six more races that season, his best finish being a 22nd at the Ford 300. He was slated to drive for FitzBradshaw Racing full-time in the Busch Series, along with teammate, Tracy Hines, both competing for Rookie of the Year. However, about halfway through the season, Kauffman was released due to a lack of performance and did not compete in NASCAR again after that.

== Motorsports career results ==
=== NASCAR ===
(key) (Bold – Pole position awarded by qualifying time. Italics – Pole position earned by points standings or practice time. * – Most laps led.)

==== Busch Series ====
NASCAR Busch Series results
Year	Team	No.	Make	1	2	3	4	5	6	7	8	9	10	11	12	13	14	15	16	17	18	19	20	21	22	23	24	25	26	27	28	29	30	31	32	33	34	35	NBSC	Pts	Ref
2005	FitzBradshaw Racing	12	Dodge	DAY	CAL	MXC	LVS	ATL	NSH	BRI	TEX	PHO	TAL	DAR	RCH	CLT	DOV	NSH	KEN	MLW	DAY	CHI	NHA	PPR	GTY	IRP; 25	GLN	MCH	BRI; 34	CAL	RCH	DOV; 36	KAN; 23	CLT	MEM; 34	TEX	PHO; 29	HOM; 22	67th	532	
2006	FitzBradshaw Racing	12	Dodge	DAY	CAL; 27	MXC; 34	LVS; 43	ATL; 32	BRI; 42	TEX; 35	NSH; 23	PHO; 30	TAL	RCH; DNQ	DAR; 35	CLT; DNQ	DOV	NSH	KEN; 27	MLW; 31	DAY	CHI	NHA	MAR	GTY	IRP	GLN	MCH	BRI	CAL	RCH	DOV	KAN	CLT	MEM	TEX	PHO	HOM	57th	716	

=== ARCA Re/Max Series ===
(key) (Bold – Pole position awarded by qualifying time. Italics – Pole position earned by points standings or practice time. * – Most laps led.)

ARCA Re/Max Series results
Year	Team	No.	Make	1	2	3	4	5	6	7	8	9	10	11	12	13	14	15	16	17	18	19	20	21	22	23	ARMC	Pts	Ref
2005	FitzBradshaw Racing	14	Dodge	DAY	NSH	SLM	KEN	TOL	LAN	MIL	POC	MCH	KAN	KEN	BLN	POC	GTW	LER	NSH	MCH	ISF	TOL	DSF	CHI; 13	SLM	TAL	119th	165	

Sporting positions
Preceded by Brian Ross	CRA Super Series Champion; 2002	Succeeded by Bobby Parsley
