= Paul Wolfe =

American racing driver and crew chief (born 1977)

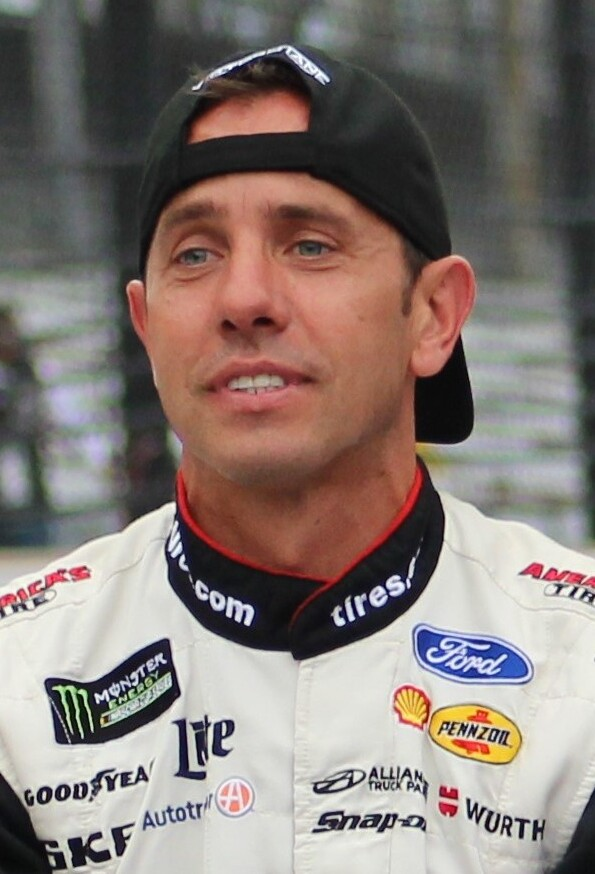
- Wolfe at Indianapolis Motor Speedway in 2018
- Born: Paul Stuart Wolfe; April 24, 1977 (age 49); Milford, New York, U.S.

NASCAR O'Reilly Auto Parts Series career
- 16 races run over 3 years
- Best finish: 52nd (2005)
- First race: 2003 Stacker 200 (Dover)
- Last race: 2005 Emerson Radio 250 (Richmond)
| Wins | Top tens | Poles |
|---|---|---|
| 0 | 1 | 0 |
- Statistics up to date as of May 8, 2020.

Paul Stuart Wolfe (born April 24, 1977) is an American NASCAR crew chief and former driver. The second son of Charles F. Wolfe, Jr. and Susan M. (Farmer) Wolfe. Wolfe graduated from Milford Central School in 1995. He competed in the NASCAR Busch North Series between 2000 and 2004, and in the Busch Series between 2003 and 2005.

== NASCAR career ==
In 2005, Wolfe was slated to drive the No. 6 Dodge Charger for Evernham Motorsports. In the first four events, Wolfe failed to finish in the top twenty-five once and did not qualify for a race at Mexico City's Autódromo Hermanos Rodríguez. He was immediately replaced by Jeremy Mayfield and Kasey Kahne, with team owner Ray Evernham stating that the team "felt it was necessary at this time to make some changes to ensure [it is] competitive." He remained under contract with the team and returned to race the car in three more events later in the year, finishing in the top-ten at Nashville Superspeedway in his final race with the team. Afterwards, he signed with FitzBradshaw Racing; he raced both the No. 40 and No. 12 Dodges in a combined five races, with his best finish being 23rd. He then worked with FitzBradshaw as crew chief on the No. 12 and No. 22 Dodge Chargers driven in the NASCAR Grand National Division and Busch East Series by 2006 ROTY Rubén Pardo and John Freeman.

In 2008, Wolfe worked with Braun Racing as crew chief of the No. 38 Toyota driven by Jason Leffler in the NASCAR Nationwide Series.

In 2009, Wolfe worked as crew chief for CJM Racing while Mike Bliss was driving CJM's No. 11 car.

In 2010, Wolfe joined Penske Racing as crew chief of Brad Keselowski's No. 22 Dodge. He and Keselowski won the Nationwide series championship in 2010, giving Roger Penske his first NASCAR title.

In 2011, Wolfe remained with Penske, reuniting with Keselowski in the Sprint Cup Series, replacing Jay Guy. Wolfe and Keselowski got their first victory together in the STP 400 at Kansas Speedway, edging Dale Earnhardt Jr. by stretching their fuel mileage. Later in the season, the duo also won at Pocono, and Bristol, propelling the No. 2 team into the Chase.

In 2012, Wolfe lead Penske Racing to its first ever NASCAR Sprint Cup Series championship, and making Wolfe the first NASCAR Crew Chief to win championships in both the Nationwide and Sprint Cup Series.

On March 2, 2014, Wolfe's wife Aleah gave birth to their first child, Caden Paul. As a result, Wolfe did not serve as Keselowski's crew chief at The Profit on CNBC 500 that day.

Wolfe moved to Penske's No. 22 team with Joey Logano in 2020. Wolfe would win the 2022 and 2024 title with Logano.

== Motorsports career results ==
=== NASCAR ===
(key) (Bold – Pole position awarded by qualifying time. Italics – Pole position earned by points standings or practice time. * – Most laps led.)

==== Busch Series ====
NASCAR Busch Series results
| Year | Team | No. | Make | 1 | 2 | 3 | 4 | 5 | 6 | 7 | 8 | 9 | 10 | 11 | 12 | 13 | 14 | 15 | 16 | 17 | 18 | 19 | 20 | 21 | 22 | 23 | 24 | 25 | 26 | 27 | 28 | 29 | 30 | 31 | 32 | 33 | 34 | 35 | NBSC | Pts | Ref |
|---|---|---|---|---|---|---|---|---|---|---|---|---|---|---|---|---|---|---|---|---|---|---|---|---|---|---|---|---|---|---|---|---|---|---|---|---|---|---|---|---|---|
| 2003 | Tommy Baldwin Racing | 6 | Dodge | DAY | CAR | LVS | DAR | BRI | TEX | TAL | NSH | CAL | RCH | GTY | NZH | CLT | DOV | NSH | KEN | MLW | DAY | CHI | NHA | PPR | IRP | MCH | BRI | DAR | RCH | DOV; 16 | KAN | CLT | MEM | ATL; 19 | PHO | CAR | HOM | | 89th | 221 | |
| 2004 | Tommy Baldwin Racing | 6 | Dodge | DAY; 36 | CAR; DNQ | LVS; 18 | DAR | BRI | TEX | NSH | TAL | CAL | GTY | RCH | NZH | CLT | DOV | NSH | KEN | MLW | DAY | CHI | NHA; 12 | PPR | IRP | MCH | BRI | CAL | RCH | DOV | KAN | CLT | MEM | ATL | PHO | DAR | HOM | | 77th | 291 | |
| 2005 | Evernham Motorsports | 6 | Dodge | DAY; 26 | CAL; 26 | MXC; DNQ | LVS; 30 | ATL | NSH | BRI | TEX | PHO | TAL | DAR | RCH; 37 | CLT | DOV; 16 | NSH; 10 | KEN | MLW | DAY | CHI | NHA | PPR | | | | | | | | | | | | | | | 52nd | 906 | |
| 2005 | FitzBradshaw Racing | 40 | Dodge | | | | | | | | | | | | | | | | | | | | | | GTY; 29 | IRP; 38 | | | | | | | | | | | | | 52nd | 906 | |
| 2005 | FitzBradshaw Racing | 12 | Dodge | | | | | | | | | | | | | | | | | | | | | | | | GLN; 23 | MCH; 32 | BRI | CAL | RCH; 29 | DOV | KAN | CLT | MEM | TEX | PHO | HOM | 52nd | 906 | |

==== Busch North Series ====
NASCAR Busch North Series results
| Year | Team | No. | Make | 1 | 2 | 3 | 4 | 5 | 6 | 7 | 8 | 9 | 10 | 11 | 12 | 13 | 14 | 15 | 16 | 17 | 18 | 19 | 20 | NBNC | Pts | Ref |
|---|---|---|---|---|---|---|---|---|---|---|---|---|---|---|---|---|---|---|---|---|---|---|---|---|---|---|
| 2000 | Paul Wolfe | 2 | Chevy | LEE; 23 | NHA; 21 | SEE | HOL | BEE | | | | | | | | | | | | | | | | 29th | 957 | |
| 2000 | Paul Wolfe | 54 | Chevy | | | | | | JEN; 17 | GLN | STA; 26 | NHA; 40 | NZH | STA; DNQ | WFD; 24 | GLN | EPP | TMP; 29 | TRO | BEE; 23 | NHA; 5 | LIM; 25 | | 29th | 957 | |
| 2001 | Paul Wolfe | 54 | Chevy | LEE | NHA; 5 | SEE | HOL | BEE; 11 | EPP | STA | WFD | BEE | TMP | NHA; 15 | STA | SEE | GLN; 3 | NZH; 2 | TRO | BEE | DOV; 14 | STA | LIM; 7 | 27th | 1005 | |
| 2002 | Paul Wolfe | 54 | Chevy | LEE | NHA; 33 | **NZH**; 6 | SEE | BEE | STA | HOL | WFD | TMP | NHA; 9 | STA | GLN; 14 | ADI | TRO | BEE | NHA; 6 | **DOV**; 2* | STA; 10 | LIM; 4 | | 26th | 1087 | |
| 2003 | Tommy Baldwin Racing | 9 | Dodge | LEE; 7 | STA; 7 | LER; 17 | BEE; 24 | STA; 29 | HOL; 12 | TMP; 22 | NHA; 37 | WFD | SEE | GLN; 26 | ADI; 6 | BEE | TRO | NHA; 3 | STA | LIM | | | | 22nd | 1257 | |
| 2004 | | 19 | Chevy | LEE | TMP | LIM | SEE | STA | HOL; 10 | LER | WFD | NHA | ADI | GLN; 6 | NHA; 2 | DOV; 2* | | | | | | | | 24th | 639 | |

==== Winston West Series ====
NASCAR Winston West Series results
| Year | Team | No. | Make | 1 | 2 | 3 | 4 | 5 | 6 | 7 | 8 | 9 | 10 | 11 | 12 | NWWC | Pts | Ref |
|---|---|---|---|---|---|---|---|---|---|---|---|---|---|---|---|---|---|---|
| 2003 | D'Hondt Motorsports | 06 | Dodge | PHO; 17 | LVS | CAL | MAD | TCR | EVG | IRW | S99 | RMR | DCS | PHO | MMR | 54th | 112 | |
