= Kertus Davis =

American racing driver

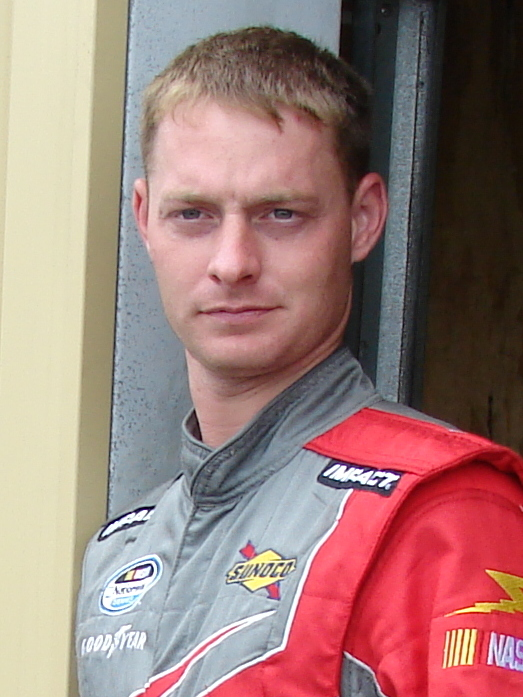
- Davis at New Hampshire Motor Speedway 2008
- Born: February 26, 1981 (age 45); Gaffney, South Carolina, U.S.
- Achievements: 1998 South Carolina State Karting Championship

NASCAR O'Reilly Auto Parts Series career
- 117 races run over 8 years
- 2009 position: 59th
- Best finish: 31st (2005)
- First race: 2001 Nazareth 200 (Nazareth)
- Last race: 2009 U.S. Cellular 250 (Iowa)
Wins	Top tens	Poles
0	1	0
- Statistics up to date as of July 2, 2012.

Kertus Davis (born February 26, 1981) is an American former NASCAR driver. He was the competition director for JD Motorsports before the team went bankrupt.

== Prior to NASCAR/USAR ==
Davis began racing in go-karts at the age of eight, competing in his hometown of Gaffney around various tracks. He raced in the karts for a number of years, and finished third in the World Karting Association finals at the age of seventeen. In 1998, Davis began racing Late Model Stock Cars in various Southeastern tracks, gaining experience and a handful of top-five finishes. He mostly competed at Myrtle Beach Speedway, Greenville-Pickens Speedway, and Timmonsville Speedway. During the 1999 season, he made three starts in the USAR ProCup Series.

Davis competed for Rookie of the Year in 2000 in the USAR ProCup, competing in 20 events. He finished the season seventeenth in points with top-ten finishes. In 2001, he finished eleventh in the Southern Division points standing with eight top-ten finishes. After a part-time USAR run in 2002, he joined Premiere Motorsports to run a full-time schedule 2003. He won his first race at Smithton, Pennsylvania and finished third in the Northern Division points, thirteenth for the entire sanctioning body.

== Early NASCAR career ==
Davis made his NASCAR debut in 2001 at Nazareth Speedway for Jimmy Means. He qualified the No. 52 Broadway Motors Ford Taurus in 34th place, but finished 36th after an early engine failure. In the next two races, he finished 42nd at Dover International Speedway and fortieth at the Milwaukee Mile. He made the switch over to the No. 77 Gestener Ford for Moy Racing at the second Dover race, where he finished 34th after a crash.

Davis made five starts in 2002. He ran the No. 77 Docutech/Gestetner Ford in his first 2002 race at Richmond, and had the best weekend of his career at the time with a 29th place start and 26th-place finish. For the rest of the season, Davis only drove the No. 0 Chevrolet for his father's race team, Davis Motorsports. In four starts, his best finish was a 24th at Memphis Motorsports Park. Davis did not race at all in 2003, due to his USAR commitments, but he played a large role as Davis Motorsports began to run full-time in the series. He worked in the shop and every now and then on the pit box, as the team made its first full season.

Davis raced again in 2004, starting at Indianapolis Raceway Park for his father's team, where he had a 29th place finish, followed by a 27th at Dover and a 34th at Darlington. Davis moved to the No. 0 full-time in 2005, with RaceGirl serving as sponsor. He failed to qualify for five races, but had a career-best tenth place run at Talladega Superspeedway, and finished thirty-first in points. He also made one start in the No. 12 Supercuts/Hot Tamales Dodge at Texas Motor Speedway for FitzBradshaw Racing, but finished in fortieth due to a transmission failure. For the 2006 season, Davis attempted to race full-time. The team used former Busch Series champion Randy LaJoie to get in the race at Mexico, and at Atlanta, MacDonald Motorsports aided the Davis team with MacDonald's pit crew. Davis also took one-race deals, driving the No. 34 Sport Clips Chevrolet for Frank Cicci Racing at Darlington, the No. 43 Ollie's Bargain Outlet Dodge for the Curb Agajanian Performance Group at Dover, and at Nashville, he prepared the No. 20 Rockwell Automation car for NEXTEL Cup driver Denny Hamlin. He returned to his own car at Milwaukee, where he finished out the season. He also attempted races for Morgan Shepherd, CJM Racing, and Front Row Motorsports at the Nextel Cup level, but did not qualify for any of those races.

== 2007–present ==
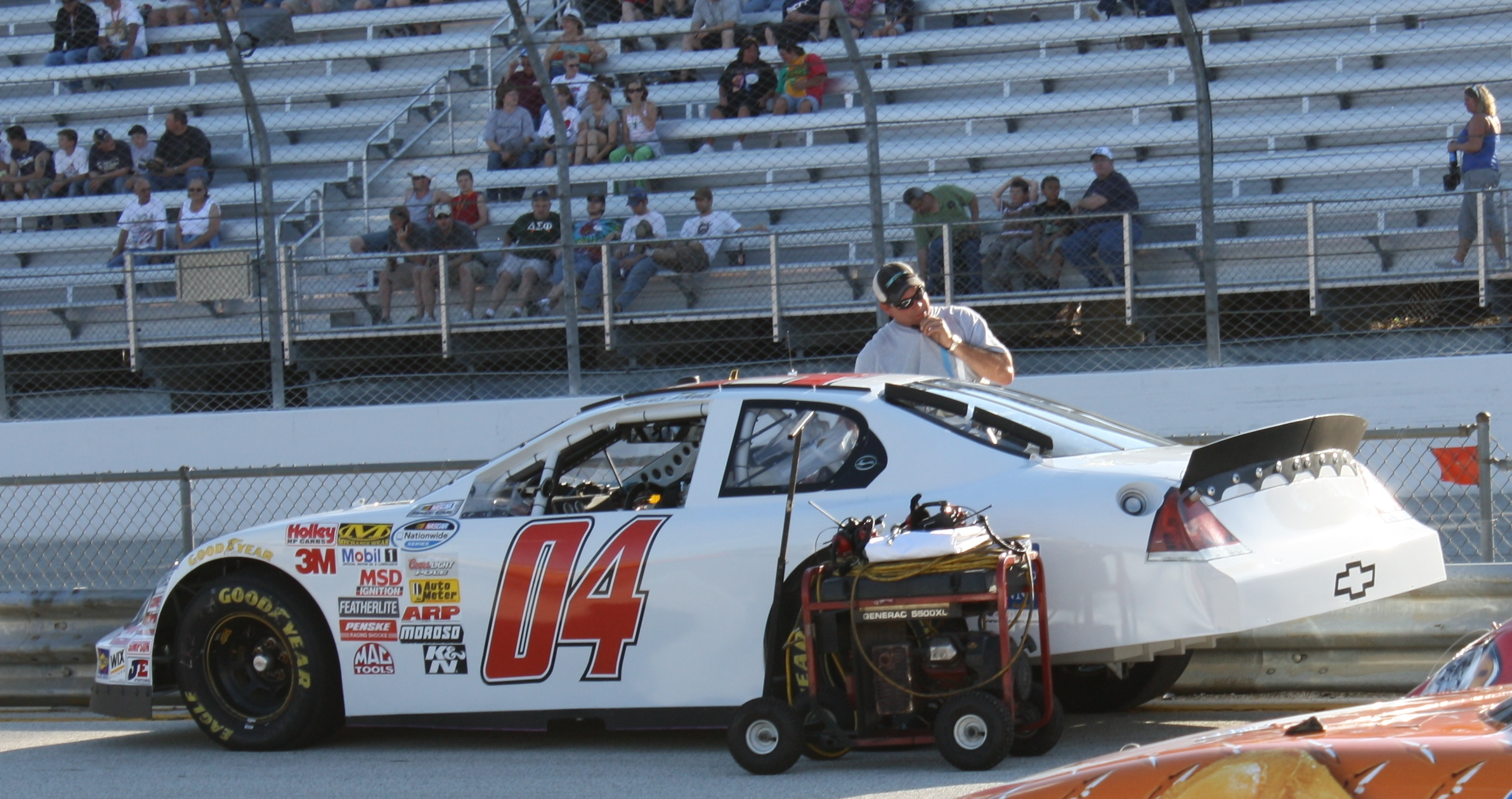
2009 Nationwide No. 04 at Milwaukee

In 2007, Davis signed to drive for Kevin Harvick Incorporated in the No. 77 Dollar General Chevy for thirteen races, sharing the car with Bobby Labonte and Kevin Harvick. Davis ran at Fontana starting 33rd but collided with Eric McClure who ironically was driving the No. 0 car that Davis drove before. He recovered to finish thirtieth, last on lead lap. He then made his first road course start at Mexico where he started 37th and finished 31st one lap down. He was replaced by Ron Hornaday Jr. prior to the race at Milwaukee. Shortly after that, it was announced that Davis had been released by KHI, due to Dollar General wanting only Cup drivers in the car. He ran the rest of the season in the No. 01 car fielded by his family team.

For 2008, Davis began the season in the No. 0 car, but moved over to the No. 01 after one race with RaceGirl sponsoring. This came after his team in the opening race of 2008 was penalized due to an illegal oil tank. The team was penalized 25 driver & owner points, and crew chief Gene Allnut was suspended for six races. In the interim, Davis had the first ever female crew chief in NASCAR's top touring series at Las Vegas. Kertus at Talladega in 2008 avoided the "Big One" again like in 2005 and he finished twelfth on the lead lap falling out of the top-ten in turn 4. Following the race at Nashville where he blew his engine, Davis left his father's team to pursue other racing options. He was 24th in points at the time. He spent the rest of the season driving the No. 49 for Jay Robinson. In 2009, Davis returned to Jay Robinson Racing in the No. 49 car. GetMoreVacations.com sponsored the car for a few races in the beginning of the season. After fourteen races in 2009 with JRR, Davis went back to his father's team to drive the No. 04 Chevy. He did not race in 2010, but served as crew chief for the No. 0 JD Motorsports Chevrolet driven by Chrissy Wallace in the Aaron's 312 at Talladega. In 2011, he became the team's competition director.

== Motorsports career results ==
=== NASCAR ===
(key) (Bold – Pole position awarded by qualifying time. Italics – Pole position earned by points standings or practice time. * – Most laps led.)

==== Nextel Cup Series ====
NASCAR Nextel Cup Series results
Year	Team	No.	Make	1	2	3	4	5	6	7	8	9	10	11	12	13	14	15	16	17	18	19	20	21	22	23	24	25	26	27	28	29	30	31	32	33	34	35	36	NNCC	Pts	Ref
2006	Shepherd Racing Ventures	89	Dodge	DAY	CAL	LVS	ATL	BRI	MAR	TEX	PHO	TAL	RCH; DNQ	DAR																										NA	-	
2006	CJM Racing	72	Dodge												CLT; DNQ	DOV	POC	MCH	SON	DAY; DNQ	CHI	NHA	POC	IND	GLN	MCH	BRI													NA	-	
2006	Front Row Motorsports	34	Chevy																									CAL; DNQ	RCH	NHA	DOV	KAN	TAL	CLT	MAR	ATL	TEX	PHO	HOM	NA	-	

==== Nationwide Series ====
NASCAR Nationwide Series results
Year	Team	No.	Make	1	2	3	4	5	6	7	8	9	10	11	12	13	14	15	16	17	18	19	20	21	22	23	24	25	26	27	28	29	30	31	32	33	34	35	NNSC	Pts	Ref
2001	Jimmy Means Racing	52	Ford	DAY	CAR	LVS	ATL	DAR	BRI	TEX	NSH	TAL	CAL	RCH	NHA	NZH; 35	CLT	DOV; 42	KEN	MLW; 40	GLN	CHI	GTY	PPR	IRP	MCH	BRI	DAR	RCH										80th	199	
2001	PRW Racing	77	Ford																											DOV; 34	KAN	CLT	MEM	PHO	CAR	HOM			80th	199	
2002	PRW Racing	77	Ford	DAY	CAR	LVS	DAR	BRI	TEX	NSH	TAL	CAL	RCH; 26	NHA	NZH	CLT	DOV	NSH	KEN																				67th	353	
2002	Davis Motorsports	0	Chevy																	MLW; 32	DAY	CHI	GTY; DNQ	PPR	IRP	MCH	BRI	DAR; 31	RCH	DOV	KAN	CLT	MEM; 24	ATL	CAR; 41	PHO	HOM; DNQ		67th	353	
2004	Davis Motorsports	0	Chevy	DAY	CAR	LVS	DAR	BRI	TEX	NSH	TAL	CAL	GTY	RCH	NZH	CLT	DOV	NSH	KEN	MLW	DAY	CHI	NHA	PPR	IRP; 29	MCH	BRI	CAL	RCH	DOV; 27	KAN	CLT; DNQ	MEM; DNQ	ATL	PHO; DNQ	DAR; 34	HOM; DNQ		93rd	219	
2005	Davis Motorsports	0	Chevy	DAY; 34	CAL; 42	MXC	LVS; 42	ATL; 28	NSH; 32	BRI; 26	TEX; 40	PHO; 25	TAL; 10	DAR; 33	RCH; DNQ	CLT; 37	DOV; 27	NSH; 36	KEN; 26	MLW; 39	DAY; 21	CHI; DNQ	NHA; 38	PPR; 41	GTY; 40	IRP; 30	GLN	MCH; 42	BRI; 33	CAL; 35	RCH; DNQ	DOV; 25	KAN; DNQ	CLT; DNQ	MEM; 28		PHO; 31	HOM; 41	31st	1804	
2005	FitzBradshaw Racing	12	Dodge																																	TEX; 40			31st	1804	
2006	Davis Motorsports	0	Chevy	DAY; DNQ	CAL; 42	MXC	LVS; DNQ	ATL; 35	BRI; 40	TEX; DNQ	NSH; 43	PHO; 41	TAL; 32	RCH; DNQ						MLW; 36	DAY; 31	CHI; 34	NHA; 31	MAR; 42	GTY; 39	IRP	GLN	MCH; 40	BRI; 38	CAL; 35	RCH; 42	DOV; 41	KAN; 36	CLT; DNQ		TEX; 37	PHO; 40	HOM; DNQ	40th	1119	
2006	Frank Cicci Racing	34	Chevy												DAR; 42	CLT; DNQ																							40th	1119	
2006	Curb Agajanian Performance Group	43	Dodge														DOV; 27	NSH	KEN																				40th	1119	
2006	Joe Gibbs Racing	20	Chevy																																MEM; QL^{†}				40th	1119	
2007	Kevin Harvick Incorporated	77	Chevy	DAY	CAL; 30	MXC; 31	LVS	ATL	BRI	NSH; 37	TEX	PHO	TAL	RCH	DAR	CLT	DOV	NSH; 32	KEN; 30	MLW	NHA	DAY	CHI	GTY															67th	584	
2007	Phoenix Racing	1	Chevy																						IRP; QL^{‡}	CGV	GLN												67th	584	
2007	D.D.L. Motorsports	01	Chevy																									MCH; 43	BRI	CAL; 33	RCH; DNQ	DOV	KAN; 43	CLT; 42	MEM; DNQ	TEX; 41	PHO; 41	HOM; DNQ	67th	584	
2008	JD Motorsports	0	Chevy	DAY; DNQ													DOV; 36																						34th	1639	
2008	JD Motorsports	01	Chevy	DAY; 32	CAL; 31	LVS; 33	ATL; 42	BRI; 23	NSH; 30	TEX; 32	PHO; 25	MXC; 43	TAL; 12	RCH; 31	DAR; 29	CLT; 25		NSH; 32																					34th	1639	
2008	Jay Robinson Racing	49	Chevy																KEN; 37		NHA; 35	DAY; 42	CHI; 42	GTY; 43	IRP; 39	CGV	GLN	MCH; DNQ	BRI; DNQ	CAL; 43	RCH; 42	DOV; 37	KAN; 40	CLT; DNQ	MEM; 39	TEX; 43	PHO; 42	HOM; 41	34th	1639	
2008	CFK Motorsports	73	Dodge																	MLW; 42																			34th	1639	
2009	Jay Robinson Racing	49	Chevy	DAY; 38	CAL; 25	LVS; DNQ	BRI; DNQ	TEX; DNQ	NSH; 40	PHO; 39	TAL; 22	RCH; 42	DAR; 40	CLT; DNQ	DOV; 36	NSH; 35	KEN																						59th	743	
2009	JD Motorsports	04	Chevy															MLW; 42	NHA; DNQ	DAY; 33	CHI; 42	GTY; DNQ	IRP; 42																59th	743	
2009	JD Motorsports	0	Chevy																					IOW; 37	GLN	MCH; DNQ	BRI; DNQ	CGV	ATL	RCH	DOV	KAN	CAL	CLT	MEM	TEX	PHO	HOM	59th	743	
^{†} - Qualified for Denny Hamlin · ^{‡} - Qualified for J. J. Yeley

=== ARCA Re/Max Series ===
(key) (Bold – Pole position awarded by qualifying time. Italics – Pole position earned by points standings or practice time. * – Most laps led.)

ARCA Re/Max Series results
Year	Team	No.	Make	1	2	3	4	5	6	7	8	9	10	11	12	13	14	15	16	17	18	19	20	21	22	23	ARMC	Pts	Ref
2004	Hylton Motorsports	48	Chevy	DAY	NSH	SLM	KEN	TOL	CLT	KAN	POC	MCH	SBO	BLN	KEN	GTW	POC	LER	NSH	ISF	TOL	DSF	CHI	SLM	TAL; DNQ		NA	-	
2005	Hylton Motorsports	48	Chevy	DAY; DNQ	NSH	SLM	KEN	TOL	LAN	MIL	POC	MCH	KAN	KEN	BLN	POC	GTW	LER	NSH	MCH	ISF	TOL	DSF	CHI	SLM	TAL	183rd	25	
