= Trail Motorsport =

Former NASCAR team

Fitz Motorsports aka FitzBradshaw Racing, Highline Performance Group, Trail Motorsport
- Owner(s): Armando Fitz, Mimi Fitz, Terry Bradshaw, Art Shelton, Patrick Shelton
- Base: Mooresville, North Carolina
- Series: Winston Cup Series, Nationwide Series
- Manufacturer: Dodge, Chevrolet
- Opened: 2001
- Closed: 2009

Career
- Drivers' Championships: 0
- Race victories: 0

Trail Motorsports (formerly HighLine Performance Group, FitzBradshaw Racing and Fitz Motorsports) was a NASCAR team based in Mooresville, North Carolina. The team was owned by Armando Fitz and Art Shelton, and was previously co-owned by Fitz's former wife Mimi. The team was known as the HighLine Performance Group until the end of the 2001 season, when they teamed up with Terry Bradshaw and formally created FitzBradshaw Racing. At the end of the 2004 season FBR announced that it was partnering with Chip Ganassi Racing, which gave them access to more technical and engineering support. In addition to that partnership they also switched manufacturers from Chevrolet to Dodge. The team also formed a partnership with Michael Waltrip Racing for the 2006 season. Bradshaw left the organization at the end of the 2006 season. The team changed its name to Trail Motorsports in early 2009 after Shelton came on board.

== Sprint Cup Series ==
While the team was called FitzBradshaw, Trail briefly ran a Cup operation in 2002 with Kerry Earnhardt driving No. 83 RacingUSA.com/Aaron's Chevrolet. The car was fielded with support from Dale Earnhardt, Inc. The team had planned to run full-time in Cup by 2004. Earnhardt failed in each of his attempts, due to rain cancelling qualifying at all three events. Ron Hornaday Jr. qualified for that year's Checker Auto Parts 500, finishing 36th. Earnhardt attempted three more races in 2003 with sponsorship from Aaron's, Supercuts, and Hot Tamales, but also failed to qualify.

=== Car No. 83 results ===
Year	Driver	No.	Make	1	2	3	4	5	6	7	8	9	10	11	12	13	14	15	16	17	18	19	20	21	22	23	24	25	26	27	28	29	30	31	32	33	34	35	36	NWCC	Pts
2002	Kerry Earnhardt	83	Chevy	DAY	CAR	LVS	ATL	DAR	BRI	TEX	MAR	TAL	CAL	RCH	CLT	DOV	POC	MCH	SON	DAY	CHI	NHA	POC	IND	GLN	MCH	BRI	DAR	RCH	NHA	DOV	KAN	TAL; DNQ	CLT; DNQ	MAR	ATL; DNQ	CAR			61st	109
2002	Ron Hornaday Jr.	83	Chevy																																			PHO; 36	HOM	61st	109
2003	Kerry Earnhardt	83	Chevy	DAY	CAR	LVS	ATL	DAR	BRI	TEX; DNQ	TAL	MAR	CAL; DNQ	RCH	CLT	DOV	POC	MCH	SON	DAY; DNQ	CHI	NHA	POC	IND	GLN	MCH	BRI	DAR	RCH	NHA	DOV	TAL	KAN	CLT	MAR	ATL	PHO	CAR	HOM	63rd	93

== Nationwide Series ==
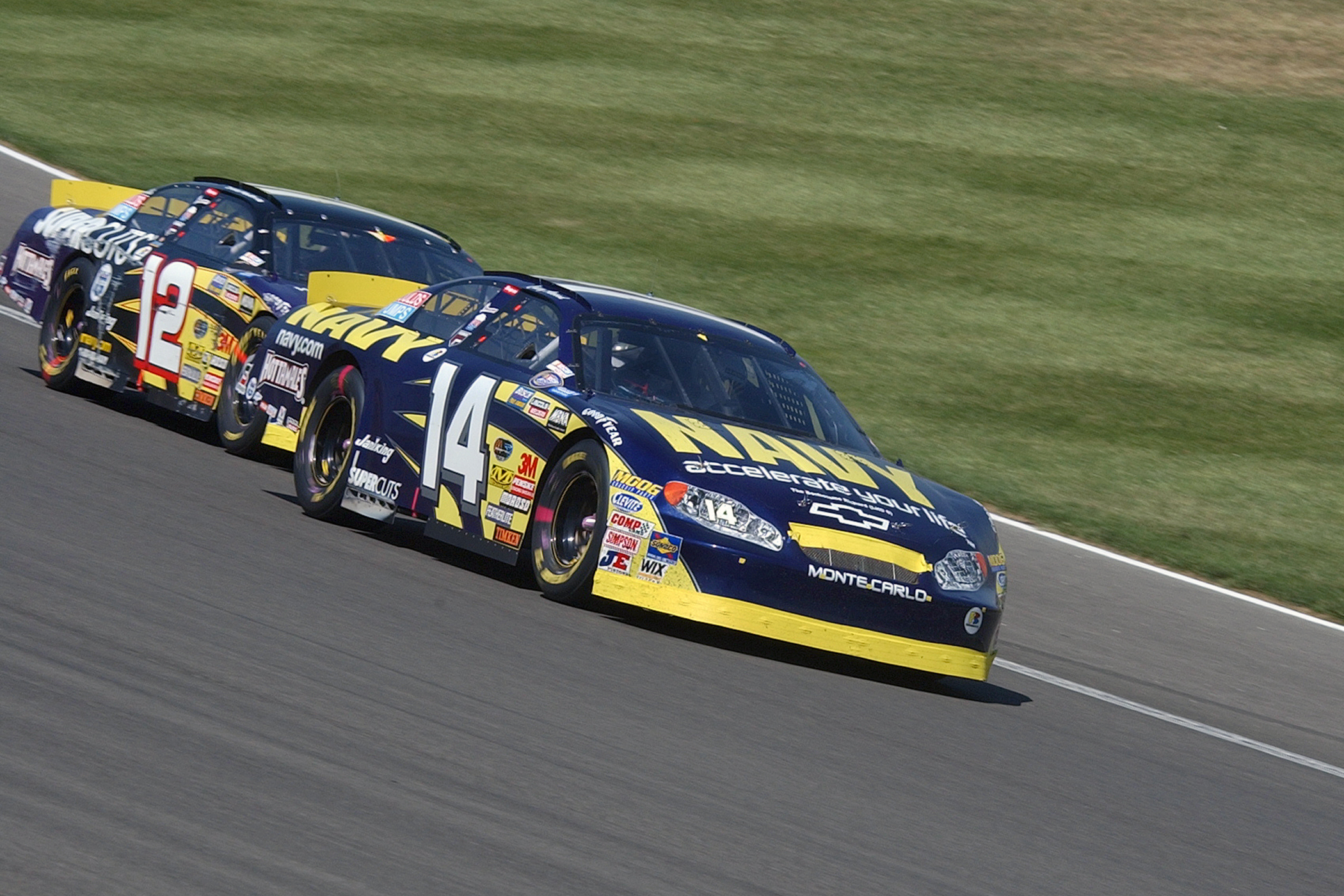
The No. 12 (left) and No. 14 cars of FitzBradshaw in 2004.

=== Beginnings ===
Armando Fitz's team started as a two-car operation during the 2001 season. He and his wife, Mimi, purchased the team from Team SABCO, owned by his father-in-law and former Sprint Cup Series co-owner Felix Sabates at the end of the 2000 season. The team, then known as the HighLine Performance Group ran the No. 8 Chevrolet and No. 11 Chevrolet. Blaise Alexander began the season in the No. 8 car, but after four races, the team cut back to a part-time schedule. Frank Kimmel, Jeff Falk, Michael Dokken, Jason Rudd, Mario Hernandez, Mark Voigt, and Josh Richeson all shared time in the car over the season, with the No. 8 team finishing 42nd in owner's points. Marty Houston drove the newly renumbered No. 11 car at the beginning of the year, his best finish being a 13th at the NAPA Auto Parts 300, but he was replaced by Ron Hornaday Jr. after the Outback Steakhouse 300. Hornaday had two top-tens but was released before the season was over, and was replaced by Todd Bodine who had one top-five in three races at the end of the season. Andy Santerre and Tim Fedewa also ran races in the car. The No. 11 car ended 21st in owner points, with Bodine finishing 29th in points.

=== Car No. 8 results ===
Year	Driver	No.	Make	1	2	3	4	5	6	7	8	9	10	11	12	13	14	15	16	17	18	19	20	21	22	23	24	25	26	27	28	29	30	31	32	33	Owners	Pts
2001	Blaise Alexander	8	Chevy	DAY; 30	CAR; 16	LVS; 43	ATL; 12	DAR	BRI	TEX																											42nd	1132
2001	Frank Kimmel	8	Chevy								NSH; 11	TAL	CAL																								42nd	1132
2001	Jeff Falk	8	Chevy											RCH; 31	NHA	NZH; 29	CLT	DOV	KEN; DNQ	MLW	GLN	CHI	GTY				BRI; 24		RCH; 25								42nd	1132
2001	Michael Dokken	8	Chevy																					PPR; 41	IRP	MCH		DAR; 42				CLT; 42				HOM; DNQ	42nd	1132
2001	Jason Rudd	8	Chevy																											DOV; 40	KAN						42nd	1132
2001	Mario Hernandez	8	Chevy																														MEM; 36				42nd	1132
2001	Mark Voigt	8	Chevy																															PHO; 43			42nd	1132
2001	Josh Richeson	8	Chevy																																CAR; 37		42nd	1132

=== Car No. 11 results ===
Year	Driver	No.	Make	1	2	3	4	5	6	7	8	9	10	11	12	13	14	15	16	17	18	19	20	21	22	23	24	25	26	27	28	29	30	31	32	33	Owners	Pts
2001	Marty Houston	11	Chevy	DAY; 13	CAR; 42	LVS; 36	ATL; 33	DAR; 20	BRI; 14	TEX; 25	NSH; 23	TAL; 37	CAL; 32	RCH; 38	NHA; 30	NZH; 25	CLT; 32	DOV; 17	KEN; 21																		21st	3282
2001	Ron Hornaday Jr.	11	Chevy																	MLW; 8	GLN; 10	CHI; 16				MCH; 14	BRI; 27	DAR; 11	RCH; 11	DOV; 26	KAN; 34						21st	3282
2001	Andy Santerre	11	Chevy																				GTY; 16	PPR; 13	IRP; 17												21st	3282
2001	Todd Bodine	11	Chevy																													CLT; 15		PHO; 5	CAR; 24	HOM; 15	21st	3282
2001	Tim Fedewa	11	Chevy																														MEM; 6				21st	3282

=== Primary Car history ===
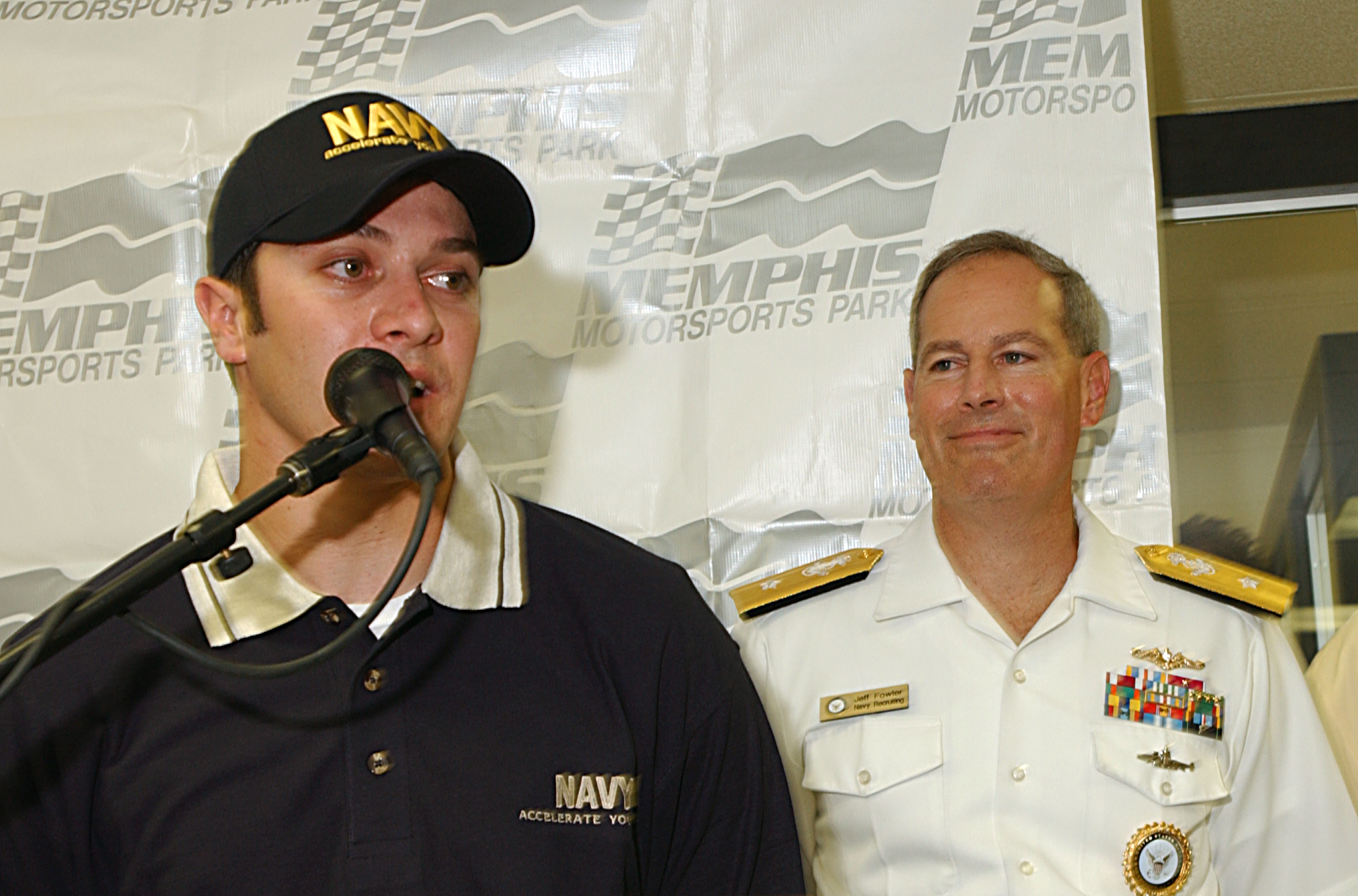
Rear Adm. Jeff Fowler, right, looks-on as the new driver of the Busch Series "Life Accelerator," David Stremme, takes questions during a press conference at Memphis Motor Sports Park. Fowler announced that the Navy would extend its partnership with NASCAR and FitzBradshaw for the 2005 season.

In 2002, the newly formed FitzBradshaw Racing signed Supercuts, 10-10-220, Hot Tamales, and Jani-King as sponsors and Kerry Earnhardt as the driver of the team's No. 12 Chevrolet. The team also formed a technical alliance with Dale Earnhardt, Inc., receiving engines and engineering support from DEI. Earnhardt had two top-fives and finished 22nd in points. Earnhardt did not have a top-ten finish in 2003, and was released after the Tropicana Twister 300. Tim Fedewa, who had been Earnhardt's spotter since 2002, and crew chief for a single race, replaced him for the balance of the season. Fedewa finished in the top-20 eight times. Fedewa had five top-tens in 2004, and finished sixteenth in points. Fedewa struggled in 2005, and did not finish in the top-ten, causing him to be released after Pikes Peak. Joel Kauffman, Paul Wolfe, Carlos Contreras, Kertus Davis, Sterling Marlin, and Steadman Marlin all shared the ride for the rest of the season. In 2006, the No. 12 car has seen several different drivers through the first 25 races of the season. Joel Kauffman was slated to run the full schedule for the team this year, however after struggling the team scaled back his schedule. David Reutimann ran the car at Daytona because Kauffman had not received approval for superspeedway racing. Tracy Hines and Mike Skinner drove the car in multiple races. For the 2007 season, Fitz Motorsports switched to the No. 22 and signed David Stremme and Mike Bliss as their principal drivers. Both drivers had great success in the No. 22, with Bliss scoring the team's best finish of second at Memphis. When the team came to Montreal for the inaugural NAPA Auto Parts 200, the team - in a last-second decision - placed Canadian CART regular Patrick Carpentier in the car. Carpentier won the pole position for the race and charged from 6th with less than 2 laps to go to finish second to Kevin Harvick.

Bliss returned in 2008 to drive full-time, but left for Phoenix Racing after six races, and was replaced by various Cup drivers including Robby Gordon and Reed Sorenson. Michael Waltrip Racing development driver Josh Wise became the new driver for thirteen races with one top-five finish. Of note, Fitz switched temporarily to Toyota during Wise's runs with the team. A wide variety of drivers including former Champ Car driver Andrew Ranger, 2008 Daytona 500 winner Ryan Newman, Jarit Johnson, and Joe Gibbs Racing development driver Marc Davis, took over for the rest of the season. This team shut down in early 2009.

=== Car No. 12/22 results ===
Year	Driver	No.	Make	1	2	3	4	5	6	7	8	9	10	11	12	13	14	15	16	17	18	19	20	21	22	23	24	25	26	27	28	29	30	31	32	33	34	35	Owners	Pts
2002	Kerry Earnhardt	12	Chevy	DAY; 41	CAR; 28	LVS; 19	DAR; 18	BRI; 28	TEX; 23	NSH; 8	TAL; 18	CAL; 21	RCH; 33	NHA; 18	NZH; 20	CLT; 28	DOV; 16	NSH; 18	KEN; 7	MLW; 27	DAY; 38	CHI; 43	GTY; 12	PPR; 18	IRP; 35	MCH; 21	BRI; 31	DAR; 28	RCH; 27	DOV; 39	KAN; 2	CLT; 31	MEM; 5	ATL; 41	CAR; 31	PHO; 10	HOM; 27		26th	3145
2003	Kerry Earnhardt	12	Chevy	DAY; 14	CAR; 15	LVS; 14	DAR; 33	BRI; 34	TEX; 31	TAL; 17	NSH; 26	CAL; 40	RCH; 19	GTY; 17	NZH; 14	CLT; 35	DOV; 14	NSH; 30	KEN; 34	MLW; 15	DAY; 33	CHI; 41																	18th	3170
2003	Tim Fedewa	12	Chevy																				NHA; 12	PPR; 13	IRP; 13	MCH; 25	BRI; 24	DAR; 19	RCH; 18	DOV; 17	KAN; 18	CLT; 25	MEM; 20	ATL; 24	PHO; 24	CAR; 24	HOM; 42		18th	3170
2004	Tim Fedewa	12	Chevy	DAY; 16	CAR; 18	LVS; 7	DAR; 16	BRI; 12	TEX; 15	NSH; 12	TAL; 37	CAL; 31	GTY; 9	RCH; 17	NZH; 15	CLT; 42	DOV; 9	NSH; 11	KEN; 34	MLW; 17	DAY; 10	CHI; 17	NHA; 2	PPR; 25	IRP; 34	MCH; 23	BRI; 16	CAL; 27	RCH; 35	DOV; 13	KAN; 38	CLT; 31	MEM; 23	ATL; 33	PHO; 18	DAR; 14	HOM; 21		20th	3480
2005	Tim Fedewa	12	Dodge	DAY; 24	CAL; 21	MXC; 21	LVS; 15	ATL; 38	NSH; 26	BRI; 25	TEX; 16	PHO; 41	TAL; 37	DAR; 19	RCH; 41	CLT; 29	DOV; 34	NSH; 21	KEN; 40	MLW; 27	DAY; 24	CHI; 32	NHA; 13	PPR; 18															28th	2846
2005	Sterling Marlin	12	Dodge																						GTY; 12														28th	2846
2005	Joel Kauffman	12	Dodge																							IRP; 25			BRI; 34			DOV; 36	KAN; 23		MEM; 34		PHO; 29	HOM; 22	28th	2846
2005	Paul Wolfe	12	Dodge																								GLN; 23	MCH; 32			RCH; 29								28th	2846
2005	Carlos Contreras	12	Dodge																											CAL; 33									28th	2846
2005	Steadman Marlin	12	Dodge																															CLT; 19					28th	2846
2005	Kertus Davis	12	Dodge																																	TEX; 40			28th	2846
2006	David Reutimann	12	Dodge	DAY; 29																																			34th	2561
2006	Joel Kauffman	12	Dodge		CAL; 27	MXC; 34	LVS; 43	ATL; 32	BRI; 42	TEX; 35	NSH; 23	PHO; 30		RCH; DNQ	DAR; 35	CLT; DNQ			KEN; 27	MLW; 31																			34th	2561
2006	Tracy Hines	12	Dodge										TAL; 25								DAY; 29	CHI; 41	NHA; 34																34th	2561
2006	Mike Skinner	12	Dodge														DOV; 25	NSH; 26								IRP; 18		MCH; 29	BRI; 13		RCH; 32			CLT; 10		TEX; 21	PHO; DNQ	HOM; 24	34th	2561
2006	Carlos Contreras	12	Dodge																					MAR; 29			GLN; 32			CAL; 38					MEM; 39				34th	2561
2006	Kevin Hamlin	12	Dodge																						GTY; DNQ														34th	2561
2006	Scott Wimmer	12	Dodge																													DOV; 11							34th	2561
2006	Ted Musgrave	12	Dodge																														KAN; 30						34th	2561
2007	David Stremme	22	Dodge	DAY; DNQ	CAL; 12		LVS; 5	ATL; 11	BRI; 33		TEX; 19					CLT; 16							CHI; 25					MCH; 24											8th	3381
2007	Carlos Contreras	22	Dodge			MXC; 35																																	8th	3381
2007	Mike Bliss	22	Dodge						BRI; 10	NSH; 10		PHO; 15	TAL; 14	RCH; 33	DAR; 18		DOV; 9	NSH; 16	KEN; 9	MLW; 25	NHA; 13	DAY; 17		GTY; 33					BRI; 13		RCH; 5	DOV; 4	KAN; 31	CLT; 29	MEM; 2	TEX; 43	PHO; 32	HOM; 23	8th	3381
2007	Josh Wise	22	Dodge																						IRP; 19														8th	3381
2007	Patrick Carpentier	22	Dodge																							CGV; 2	GLN; 19												8th	3381
2007	Robby Gordon	22	Dodge																											CAL; 9									8th	3381
2008	Mike Bliss	22	Dodge	DAY; 17	CAL; 13	LVS; 26	ATL; 7	BRI; 5	NSH; 11																														23rd	3409
2008	Robby Gordon	22	Dodge							TEX; 20	PHO; 27																												23rd	3409
2008	Rubén Pardo	22	Dodge									MXC; 18			DAR; 42																								23rd	3409
2008	Reed Sorenson	22	Dodge										TAL; 29																										23rd	3409
2008	Johnny Sauter	22	Dodge											RCH; 24																									23rd	3409
2008	Josh Wise	22	Dodge													CLT; 24	DOV; 19	NSH; 33	KEN; 23	MLW; 33	NHA; 20	DAY; 33	CHI; 25	GTY; 16	IRP; 5							DOV; 13							23rd	3409
2008	Andrew Ranger	22	Dodge																							CGV; 28			BRI; 19		RCH; 33		KAN; 31	CLT; 20					23rd	3409
2008	Ryan Newman	22	Dodge																								GLN; 12												23rd	3409
2008	Josh Wise	22	Toyota																									MCH; 14		CAL; 22									23rd	3409
2008	Jarit Johnson	22	Dodge																																MEM; 32				23rd	3409
2008	Marc Davis	22	Dodge																																	TEX; 30	PHO; 27	HOM; 27	23rd	3409
2009	Johnny Borneman III	22	Ford	DAY; DNQ	CAL; DNQ	LVS; DNQ	BRI	TEX	NSH	PHO	TAL	RCH	DAR	CLT	DOV	NSH	KEN	MLW	NHA	DAY	CHI	GTY	IRP	IOW	GLN	MCH	BRI	CGV	ATL	RCH	DOV	KAN	CAL	CLT	MEM	TEX	PHO	HOM	N/A	0

=== Second Car history ===
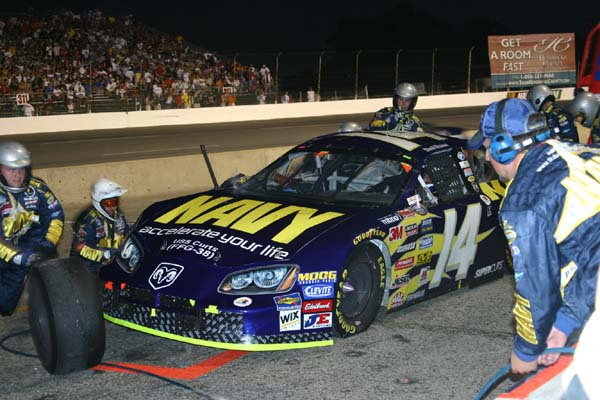
David Stremme pitting the No. 14 at IRP.

The team expanded to two cars in 2003 halfway through the season as the United States Navy came aboard to sponsor the No. 14 for nine races. Casey Atwood debuted the car at Kentucky Speedway, bringing it home in 9th place. Atwood ran 11 races that year, posting four top-ten finishes. Atwood came back in 2004, and had seven top-tens, when he was dismissed after Charlotte. His immediate replacement was Dave Blaney for one race, with Braun Racing's David Stremme named as his permanent replacement. As part of the arrangement to bring Stremme to the team, FitzBradshaw agreed to align themselves with Chip Ganassi Racing, who had him under contract as part of a driver development deal. This would allow the team to finish the season as a Chevrolet team, but beginning the next year both the No. 12 and the No. 14 would switch to Dodge as Ganassi's team was fielding the vehicles at the time.

Stremme ran the No. 14 full-time in 2005, and had ten top-tens, finishing 13th in points, before moving up to compete in the Nextel Cup series. Tracy Hines was hired to run in the No. 14 Dodge for the 2006 season, however sponsorship issues forced the team to compete on a limited basis. Steadman Marlin competed for the team in two races and A. J. Foyt IV competed in one race for the team. It was announced in July 2006 that Family Dollar would sponsor the car for nine races and the team would feature Ricky Craven, Carlos Contreras, and Mike Skinner as drivers. Fitz Motorsports changed the car number to No. 44 for 2007 and Rubén Pardo qualified for the team's first race at the Telcel-Motorola México 200, followed up by another start at Nashville Superspeedway. Mike Bliss also drove the No. 44 with Family Dollar sponsorship at Charlotte in May 2007. For 2008, Kenny Wallace was signed to drive the No. 36 with sponsorship from Shark Energy. Although Wallace missed the season opener at Daytona, he ran all following races until owner Armando Fitz announced on March 17 that the No. 36 team would only run part-time due to a lack of product distribution, and the owner points of the 36 were switched the No. 28 of Wallace's new team. The No. 36 began running part-time with Pardo and Charles Lewandoski driving midway through the season.

=== Car No. 14/44/36 results ===
Year	Driver	No.	Make	1	2	3	4	5	6	7	8	9	10	11	12	13	14	15	16	17	18	19	20	21	22	23	24	25	26	27	28	29	30	31	32	33	34	35	Owners	Pts
2003	Casey Atwood	14	Chevy	DAY	CAR	LVS	DAR	BRI	TEX	TAL	NSH	CAL	RCH	GTY	NZH	CLT	DOV	NSH	KEN; 9	MLW; 19	DAY; 27	CHI	NHA; 32	PPR	IRP	MCH	BRI; 18	DAR; 10	RCH; 11	DOV; 25	KAN	CLT; 32	MEM; 7	ATL	PHO; 8	CAR	HOM; 43		42nd	1243
2004	Casey Atwood	14	Chevy	DAY; 15	CAR; 19	LVS; 36	DAR; 9	BRI; 34	TEX; 21	NSH; 20	TAL; 13	CAL; 29	GTY; 23	RCH; 14	NZH; 6	CLT; 17	DOV; 18	NSH; 7	KEN; 22	MLW; 32	DAY; 24	CHI; 13	NHA; 31	PPR; 9	IRP; 8	MCH; 25	BRI; 10	CAL; 26	RCH; 2	DOV; 24	KAN; 22	CLT; 20							14th	3680
2004	Dave Blaney	14	Chevy																														MEM; 19						14th	3680
2004	David Stremme	14	Chevy																															ATL; 8	PHO; 21	DAR; 31	HOM; 12		14th	3680
2005	David Stremme	14	Dodge	DAY; 40	CAL; 8	MXC; 22	LVS; 3	ATL; 13	NSH; 26	BRI; 38	TEX; 17	PHO; 3	TAL; 3	DAR; 6	RCH; 27	CLT; 8	DOV; 33	NSH; 6	KEN; 32	MLW; 5	DAY; 18	CHI; 20	NHA; 22	PPR; 35	GTY; 22	IRP; 5	GLN; 17	MCH; 22	BRI; 26	CAL; 9	RCH; 35	DOV; 19	KAN; 43	CLT; 23	MEM; 11	TEX; 18	PHO; 34	HOM; 32	16th	3694
2006	Tracy Hines	14	Dodge	DAY; 20	CAL; 33		LVS; 38	ATL; 41	BRI; 13	TEX; 30		PHO; 43	TAL																										40th	1430
2006	Carlos Contreras	14	Dodge			MXC; 11																																HOM; 33	40th	1430
2006	Steadman Marlin	14	Dodge								NSH; 31																												40th	1430
2006	A. J. Foyt IV	14	Dodge											RCH; DNQ	DAR	CLT	DOV	NSH	KEN	MLW	DAY	CHI	NHA																40th	1430
2006	Ricky Craven	14	Dodge																					MAR; 39	GTY														40th	1430
2006	Ted Musgrave	14	Dodge																							IRP; 25	GLN				RCH; 21	DOV	KAN	CLT; 24		TEX; 34			40th	1430
2006	Scott Wimmer	14	Dodge																									MCH; 42	BRI; 17	CAL									40th	1430
2006	Willie Allen	14	Dodge																																MEM; 28		PHO; 35		40th	1430
2007	Rubén Pardo	44	Dodge	DAY	CAL	MXC; 41	LVS	ATL	BRI	NSH; 43	TEX	PHO	TAL	RCH	DAR																								73rd	80
2007	Mike Bliss	44	Dodge													CLT; 39	DOV	NSH																					73rd	80
2007	Carlos Contreras	44	Dodge																KEN; 43	MLW	NHA	DAY	CHI	GTY	IRP														73rd	80
2007	Mark Green	44	Dodge																							CGV; 40	GLN	MCH	BRI	CAL	RCH	DOV	KAN	CLT	MEM	TEX	PHO	HOM	73rd	80
2008	Kenny Wallace	36	Dodge	DAY; DNQ	CAL; 18	LVS; 13	ATL; 25	BRI; 11																															50th	505
2008	Rubén Pardo	36	Dodge						NSH; DNQ	TEX	PHO	MXC	TAL	RCH	DAR	CLT	DOV	NSH; 42	KEN	MLW; DNQ				GTY; 41															50th	505
2008	Charles Lewandoski	36	Dodge																		NHA; 41	DAY			IRP; DNQ	CGV	GLN	MCH	BRI	CAL	RCH	DOV	KAN	CLT	MEM	TEX	PHO	HOM	50th	505
2008	Chad Blount	36	Dodge																				CHI; DNQ																50th	505

=== Third Car history ===
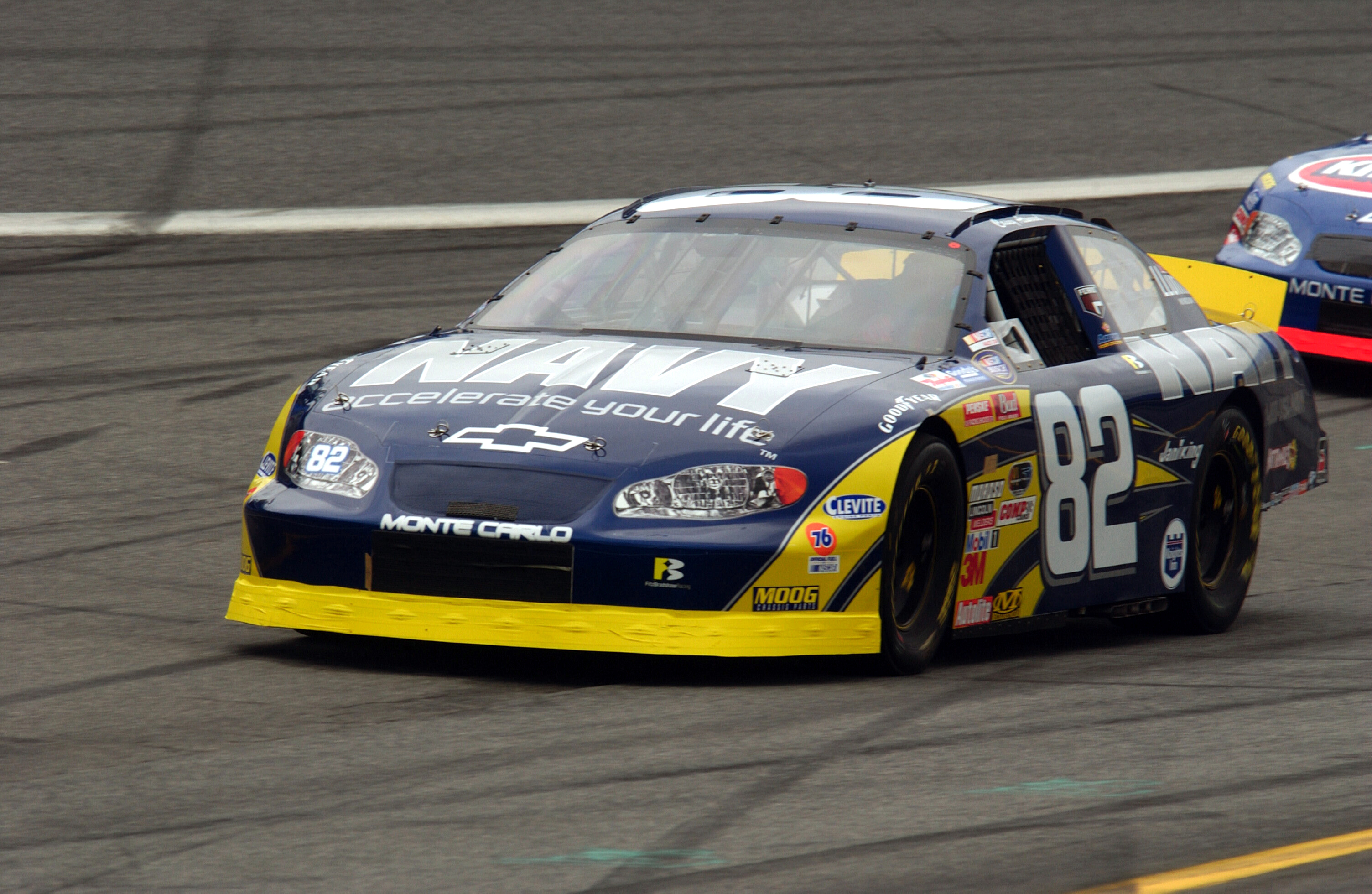
Casey Atwood in the 82 in 2003

The third FitzBradshaw car made its debut in 2003, with Jimmy Spencer driving the No. 82 Jani-King Chevrolet at Texas, finishing sixth. Casey Atwood attempted the Charlotte spring race in the No. 82 NAVY Chevrolet, failing to qualify. Atwood later drove the car at the Tropicana Twister 300 sponsored by Jani-King, finishing 21st. Randy LaJoie drove the car again at Phoenix, finishing 14th. LaJoie continued to run the car part-time in 2004 with sponsorship from Jani-King and Goulds Pumps, his best finish being 13th at Las Vegas. Dave Blaney also ran two races in the car.

In 2005, the team became a driver development team for Chip Ganassi Racing, and switched to Ganassi's No. 40 with sponsorship from Jani-King and Cottman Transmission and Total Auto Care. Sterling Marlin began the season with the team, with Carlos Contreras and Ganassi development driver Scott Lagasse Jr. filling in. Towards the end of the season, Contreras, Paul Wolfe, and Erin Crocker got majority of the starts in the car. Reed Sorenson ran the Aaron's 312 at Atlanta in March in the car after the transmission on his regular No. 41 Discount Tire car mysteriously locked up during qualifying for the race. For 2006, Michael Waltrip purchased the team's owners points and began a partnership with FBR to run the No. 99 Aaron's Dodge.

=== Car No. 82/40 results ===
Year	Driver	No.	Make	1	2	3	4	5	6	7	8	9	10	11	12	13	14	15	16	17	18	19	20	21	22	23	24	25	26	27	28	29	30	31	32	33	34	35	Owners	Pts
2003	Jimmy Spencer	82	Chevy	DAY	CAR	LVS	DAR	BRI	TEX; 6	TAL	NSH	CAL	RCH	GTY	NZH																								57th	481
2003	Casey Atwood	82	Chevy													CLT; DNQ	DOV	NSH	KEN	MLW	DAY	CHI; 21	NHA	PPR	IRP	MCH	BRI	DAR	RCH	DOV	KAN	CLT	MEM	ATL; 28					57th	481
2003	Randy LaJoie	82	Chevy																																PHO; 14	CAR	HOM; Wth		57th	481
2004	Randy LaJoie	82	Chevy	DAY	CAR	LVS; 13	DAR	BRI	TEX; 23	NSH	TAL	CAL; 30	GTY	RCH	NZH; 25	CLT	DOV	NSH	KEN	MLW	DAY; 16	CHI	NHA	PPR	IRP	MCH	BRI	CAL	RCH	DOV	KAN								56th	619
2004	Dave Blaney	82	Chevy																													CLT; 25	MEM	ATL	PHO; 42	DAR	HOM		56th	619
2005	Sterling Marlin	40	Dodge	DAY; 42	CAL; 15		LVS; 25	ATL; QL	NSH; 37	BRI; 5	TEX; 19		TAL; 21	DAR; 39	RCH; 10	CLT; 2		NSH; QL	KEN; 6		DAY; 41	CHI; 35						MCH; 12	BRI; 25			DOV; 17		CLT; 5		TEX; 22			25th	2987
2005	Carlos Contreras	40	Dodge			MXC; 36																					GLN; 32						KAN; 38				PHO; 30	HOM; 25	25th	2987
2005	Reed Sorenson	40	Dodge					ATL; 18																															25th	2987
2005	Scott Lagasse Jr.	40	Dodge									PHO; 40					DOV; 42			MLW; 22			NHA; 40	PPR; 28															25th	2987
2005	Johnny Benson	40	Dodge															NSH; 18																					25th	2987
2005	Paul Wolfe	40	Dodge																						GTY; 29	IRP; 38													25th	2987
2005	Stanton Barrett	40	Dodge																											CAL; 41	RCH; 42								25th	2987
2005	Erin Crocker	40	Dodge																																MEM; 29				25th	2987

== Other series ==
In addition to the Busch Series, Fitz Motorsports operated race teams in other series as well. In 2007, they fielded entries in the NASCAR Busch East Series with Ruben Pardo as the team's driver, with Pierre Bourque racing on a part-time basis, and the NASCAR Mexico Series, where Carlos Pardo drove the team's FitzContreras Racing entry, along with development driver Maxime Dumarey.

In 2007, the team partnered with Hyper Sport to race in the Grand-Am Road Racing series.

Ruben Pardo raced in 2008 in the East Series for Fitz. For 2009, former Rusty Wallace Racing driver Chase Austin was to drive the No. 32 Chevrolet in the Camping World Truck Series and Jarit Johnson, younger brother of seven time Sprint Cup champion Jimmie Johnson, was to drive in the Camping World East Series. However, the team shut down before their plans could come to fruition.
