= Steadman Marlin =

American racing driver

- Born: October 29, 1980 (age 46); Columbia, Tennessee, U.S.

NASCAR O'Reilly Auto Parts Series career
- 28 races run over 6 years
- Best finish: 53rd (2001)
- First race: 2000 BellSouth Mobility 320 (Nashville)
- Last race: 2006 Winn-Dixie 250 Presented by PepsiCo (Daytona)
Wins	Top tens	Poles
0	0	0

NASCAR FedEx Freight Truck Series career
- 3 races run over 2 years
- Best finish: 63rd (2004)
- First race: 2003 GNC 200 (Milwaukee)
- Last race: 2004 EasyCare Vehicle Service Contracts 200 (Atlanta)
Wins	Top tens	Poles
0	0	0

Steadman Marlin (born October 29, 1980) is an American former stock car racing driver. Marlin, the son of Sterling Marlin and grandson of the late Coo Coo Marlin, made his NASCAR debut in 2000.

== Racing career ==
=== Busch Series ===
Marlin made his NASCAR debut in 2000 at Nashville Fairgrounds, driving for Felix Sabates' No. 42 Bellsouth Chevrolet. He only managed a start in the 42nd position in a grid of 43. Marlin finished in 30th-place finish, after being involved with 20 other cars in a late-race crash. Marlin then ran eight races in 2001, running for the Sadler Bros' No. 95 Shoney's Ford. His best run was a 19th at Michigan, and had two other top-25 finishes. One of the seven races was for the No. 54 General Creation Chevy, where he crashed to a 42nd place at Memphis Motorsports Park. Marlin made six more starts in 2002, driving for the Sadler Brothers. His best run was at Kentucky Speedway, where he led his first career laps (seven), before late race problems led him to 22nd. In his other five starts, Marlin finished no worse than 30th.

In 2003, Marlin ran seven races in the No. 30 Keystone/Express Personnel Dodge for Braun Racing. His best run in his career was a 15th at California. He also tacked a pair of 24th-place finishes. However, when Braun consolidated to one car, Marlin was left unemployed. Marlin made his next start with a solo run in 2005. This time, Marlin would drive for FitzBradshaw Racing, piloting the No. 12 at Charlotte. He earned another lead lap finish of 19th. Marlin drove for the Sadler Brothers' No. 95 Keystone Light Dodge part-time in 2006. Marlin hasn't raced in NASCAR since.

=== Craftsman Truck Series ===
Marlin made his Craftsman Truck Series debut in 2003, driving the No. 9 Billy Ballew Motorsports Ford. He qualified last in the field, 36th. However, Marlin drove a solid first race in the series, coming home with a 22nd-place effort. One year later, Marlin made the first two starts for the new team called Fiddleback Racing. Marlin recorded finishes of 17th and 22nd. Despite this, Marlin did not compete in any more races for the team, and has not raced in the series since.

== Personal life ==
Steadman and his wife Mandi have one son, Stirlin Blaise Marlin.

== Motorsports career results ==
=== NASCAR ===
(key) (Bold – Pole position awarded by qualifying time. Italics – Pole position earned by points standings or practice time. * – Most laps led.)

==== Busch Series ====
NASCAR Nationwide Series results
Year	Team	No.	Make	1	2	3	4	5	6	7	8	9	10	11	12	13	14	15	16	17	18	19	20	21	22	23	24	25	26	27	28	29	30	31	32	33	34	35	NNSC	Pts	Ref
2000	Team SABCO	42	Chevy	DAY	CAR	LVS	ATL	DAR	BRI	TEX	NSV; 30	TAL	CAL	RCH	NHA	CLT	DOV	SBO	MYB	GLN	MLW	NZH	PPR	GTY	IRP	MCH	BRI	DAR	RCH	DOV	CLT	CAR							103rd	73	
2000	Team SABCO	01	Chevy																														MEM; DNQ	PHO	HOM				103rd	73	
2001	Sadler Brothers Racing	95	Ford	DAY	CAR	LVS	ATL	DAR	BRI	TEX	NSH; 22	TAL	CAL	RCH	NHA	NZH	CLT; 39	DOV	KEN; 26	MLW	GLN	CHI; 21	GTY	PPR	IRP	MCH; 19	BRI; 26	DAR	RCH	DOV	KAN; 39	CLT							53rd	602	
2001	Team Bristol Motorsports	54	Chevy																														MEM; 42	PHO	CAR	HOM			53rd	602	
2002	Sadler Brothers Racing	95	Ford	DAY; 24	CAR	LVS	DAR	BRI	TEX; 29	NSH; 27	TAL	CAL	RCH	NHA	NZH	CLT	DOV	NSH; 24	KEN; 22	MLW	DAY	CHI; DNQ	GTY	PPR; 30	IRP	MCH; DNQ	BRI	DAR	RCH	DOV	KAN; DNQ	CLT	MEM	ATL	CAR	PHO	HOM		55th	515	
2003	Carroll Racing	30	Dodge	DAY	CAR	LVS; DNQ	DAR	BRI	TEX; 28	TAL	NSH; 25	CAL; 15	RCH	GTY; 39	NZH; 24	CLT; 32	DOV	NSH	KEN; 24	MLW	DAY	CHI	NHA	PPR	IRP	MCH	BRI	DAR	RCH	DOV	KAN	CLT	MEM	ATL	PHO	CAR	HOM		63rd	580	
2005	FitzBradshaw Racing	12	Dodge	DAY	CAL	MXC	LVS	ATL	NSH	BRI	TEX	PHO	TAL	DAR	RCH	CLT	DOV	NSH	KEN	MLW	DAY	CHI	NHA	PPR	GTY	IRP	GLN	MCH	BRI	CAL	RCH	DOV	KAN	CLT; 19	MEM	TEX	PHO	HOM	107th	106	
2006	Sadler Brothers Racing	95	Dodge	DAY; 41	CAL	MXC	LVS	ATL; DNQ	BRI	TEX			TAL; 29	RCH	DAR	CLT	DOV	NSH; 38	KEN	MLW	DAY; 39	CHI	NHA	MAR	GTY	IRP	GLN	MCH	BRI	CAL	RCH	DOV	KAN; DNQ	CLT	MEM	TEX	PHO	HOM	85th	281	
2006	FitzBradshaw Racing	14	Dodge								NSH; 31	PHO																											85th	281	

==== Craftsman Truck Series ====
NASCAR Craftsman Truck Series results
Year	Team	No.	Make	1	2	3	4	5	6	7	8	9	10	11	12	13	14	15	16	17	18	19	20	21	22	23	24	25	NCTC	Pts	Ref
2003	Billy Ballew Motorsports	9	Ford	DAY	DAR	MMR	MAR	CLT	DOV	TEX	MEM	MLW; 22	KAN	KEN	GTW	MCH	IRP	NSH	BRI	RCH	NHA	CAL	LVS	SBO	TEX	MAR	PHO	HOM	133rd	-	
2004	Fiddleback Racing	67	Ford	DAY; 17	ATL; 22	MAR	MFD	CLT	DOV	TEX	MEM	MLW	KAN	KEN	GTW	MCH	IRP	NSH	BRI	RCH	NHA	LVS	CAL	TEX	MAR	PHO	DAR	HOM	63rd	209	

=== ARCA Racing Series ===
(key) (Bold – Pole position awarded by qualifying time. Italics – Pole position earned by points standings or practice time. * – Most laps led.)

ARCA Racing Series results
Year	Team	No.	Make	1	2	3	4	5	6	7	8	9	10	11	12	13	14	15	16	17	18	19	20	21	22	23	24	25	ARSC	Pts	Ref
2001	Sadler Brothers Racing	95	Ford	DAY	NSH; 13	WIN	SLM	GTY	KEN	CLT; 17	KAN	MCH	POC	MEM	GLN	KEN	MCH	POC	NSH	ISF	CHI	DSF	SLM	TOL	BLN	CLT	TAL	ATL	93rd	310	
2007	Day Enterprises	14	Chevy	DAY; DNQ	USA	NSH	SLM	KAN	WIN	KEN	TOL	IOW	POC	MCH	BLN	KEN	POC	NSH	ISF	MIL	GTW	DSF	CHI	SLM	TAL	TOL			NA	-	
