= Portlandville, New York =

- Hamlet and CDP
- Location within New York Location within the United States
- Coordinates: 42°31′49″N 74°58′02″W
- Country: United States
- State: New York
- County: Otsego
- Town: Milford
- Elevation: 1,152 ft (351 m)
- Time zone: UTC-5 (Eastern (EST))
  - Summer (DST): UTC-4 (EDT)
- ZIP code: 13834
- Area code: 607
- GNIS feature ID: 961002

Portlandville is a hamlet (and census-designated place) in Otsego County, New York, United States. As of the 2020 census, Portlandville had a population of 177. The community is located along the Susquehanna River and New York State Route 28, 7.3 miles (11.7 km) northeast of Oneonta. Portlandville has a post office with ZIP code 13834, which opened on April 9, 1828.
