= Patrick Sheltra =

American racing driver (born 1986)

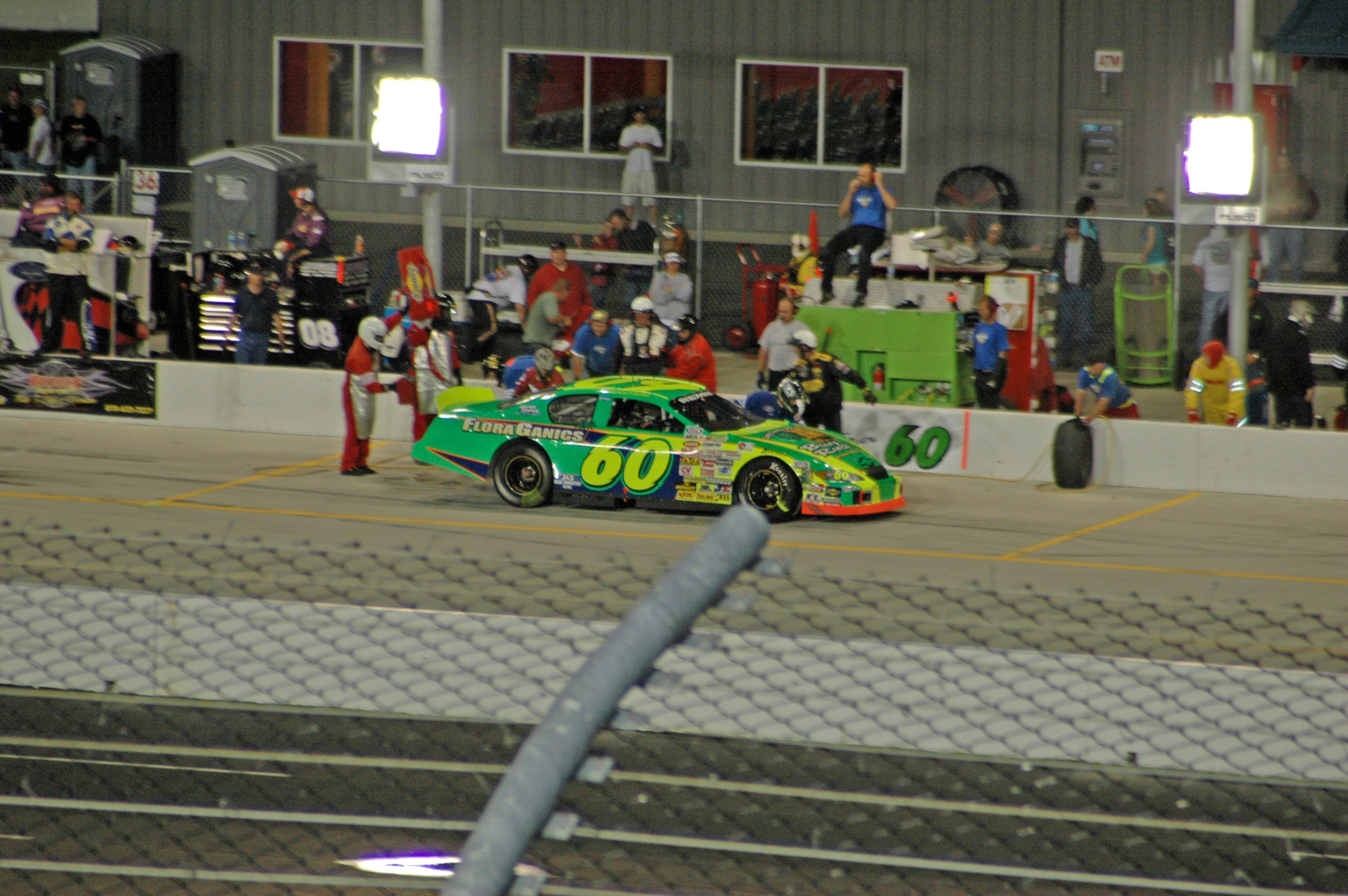
- Sheltra's No. 60 ARCA car in 2007
- Born: May 14, 1986 (age 40) Indiantown, Florida, U.S.

ARCA Racing Series
- Years active: 2005–2011
- Starts: 88
- Wins: 3
- Poles: 0
- Best finish: 1st in 2010

Championship titles
- 2010: ARCA Racing Series

NASCAR O'Reilly Auto Parts Series career
- 6 races run over 4 years
- Best finish: 72nd (2011)
- First race: 2008 Hefty Odor Block 200 (Phoenix)
- Last race: 2011 DRIVE4COPD 300 (Daytona)
Wins	Top tens	Poles
0	0	0

NASCAR FedEx Freight Truck Series career
- 2 races run over 2 years
- Best finish: 103rd (2007)
- First race: 2007 Easy Care Vehicle Service Contracts 200 (Atlanta)
- Last race: 2011 Coca-Cola 250 (Talladega)
Wins	Top tens	Poles
0	0	0
- Statistics up to date as of March 17, 2024.

Patrick Sheltra (born May 14, 1986) is an American former professional stock car racing driver and owner. He is the 2010 ARCA Racing Series champion. He also previously competed part-time in what is now the NASCAR O'Reilly Auto Parts Series and the NASCAR Craftsman Truck Series.

== Racing career ==
Starting to race at local tracks in 2001, Sheltra moved up to the ARCA Re/MAX Series in 2005, starting his first race at Chicagoland Speedway. Running his first full season in the series in 2007, he ran the next three seasons of the series as well; a wreck in the season-opening event at Daytona International Speedway in 2009 resulted in him being briefly hospitalized. His car spun and backed into the outside wall and stopped on top of the track when he was t-boned by Larry Hollenbeck at about 165 miles per hour. The crash also injured Hollenbeck. Both were released from the hospital three days later and continued racing.

Competing for the family-owned Sheltra Motorsports team, Sheltra ran his final full season of ARCA Racing Series competition in 2010, scoring two victories and 17 top-ten finishes on his way to winning the season title, his first national championship in the series. Driving the No. 60 Toyota, Sheltra won the championship by a 20-point margin over Craig Goess, becoming the first owner-driver to win the ARCA championship since Benny Parsons achieved the feat in 1969.

In addition to his career in ARCA, Sheltra ran a single NASCAR Craftsman Truck Series event in 2007, and made his debut in the NASCAR Nationwide Series in 2008, running five races in the series over the next three years. In 2011, Sheltra drove the No. 41 Ford for Rick Ware Racing in the season-opening DRIVE4COPD 300 at Daytona International Speedway. In addition, he assumed responsibility for the operation of the family race team, Sheltra Motorsports, which ran Venezuelan driver Milka Duno for the majority of the 2011 ARCA Racing Series season.

Sheltra has not driven in NASCAR and ARCA since 2011.

== Motorsports career results ==
=== NASCAR ===
(key) (Bold – Pole position awarded by qualifying time. Italics – Pole position earned by points standings or practice time. * – Most laps led.)

==== Nationwide Series ====
NASCAR Nationwide Series results
Year	Team	No.	Make	1	2	3	4	5	6	7	8	9	10	11	12	13	14	15	16	17	18	19	20	21	22	23	24	25	26	27	28	29	30	31	32	33	34	35	NNSC	Pts	Ref
2008	Sheltra Motorsports	4	Dodge	DAY	CAL	LVS	ATL	BRI	NSH	TEX	PHO	MXC	TAL	RCH	DAR	CLT	DOV	NSH	KEN	MLW	NHA	DAY	CHI	GTY	IRP	CGV	GLN	MCH	BRI	CAL	RCH	DOV	KAN	CLT	MEM	TEX	PHO; 29	HOM; 24	103rd	167	
2009	MacDonald Motorsports	81	Dodge	DAY	CAL	LVS	BRI	TEX	NSH	PHO	TAL	RCH	DAR	CLT	DOV	NSH	KEN	MLW	NHA	DAY; 41	CHI	GTY	IRP	IOW	GLN	MCH	BRI	CGV	ATL	RCH	DOV	KAN; 37	CAL	CLT	MEM	TEX	PHO	HOM	135th	92	
2010	RAB Racing	09	Ford	DAY	CAL	LVS	BRI	NSH	PHO	TEX	TAL; 18	RCH	DAR	DOV	CLT	NSH	KEN	ROA	NHA	DAY	CHI	GTY	IRP	IOW	GLN	MCH	BRI	CGV	ATL	RCH	DOV	KAN	CAL	CLT	GTY	TEX	PHO	HOM	108th	114	
2011	Rick Ware Racing	41	Ford	DAY; 24	PHO	LVS	BRI	CAL	TEX	TAL	NSH	RCH	DAR	DOV	IOW	CLT	CHI	MCH	ROA	DAY	KEN	NHA	NSH	IRP	IOW	GLN	CGV	BRI	ATL	RCH	CHI	DOV	KAN	CLT	TEX	PHO	HOM		72nd	20	

==== Camping World Truck Series ====
NASCAR Camping World Truck Series results
Year	Team	No.	Make	1	2	3	4	5	6	7	8	9	10	11	12	13	14	15	16	17	18	19	20	21	22	23	24	25	NCWTC	Pts	Ref
2007	Andy Belmont Motorsports	12	Chevy	DAY	CAL	ATL	MAR	KAN	CLT	MFD	DOV	TEX	MCH	MLW	MEM	KEN	IRP	NSH	BRI	GTW	NHA	LVS	TAL	MAR	ATL; 32	TEX	PHO	HOM	103rd	67	
2011	Chase Mattioli Racing	99	Ford	DAY	PHO	DAR	MAR	NSH	DOV	CLT	KAN	TEX	KEN	IOW	NSH	IRP	POC	MCH	BRI	ATL	CHI	NHA	KEN	LVS	TAL; 35	MAR	TEX	HOM	113th	0^{1}	

=== ARCA Racing Series ===
(key) (Bold – Pole position awarded by qualifying time. Italics – Pole position earned by points standings or practice time. * – Most laps led.)

ARCA Racing Series results
Year	Team	No.	Make	1	2	3	4	5	6	7	8	9	10	11	12	13	14	15	16	17	18	19	20	21	22	23	ARSC	Pts	Ref
2005	Sheltra Motorsports	2	Chevy	DAY	NSH	SLM	KEN; DNQ	TOL	LAN	MIL	POC	MCH	KAN	KEN	BLN	POC	GTW	LER	NSH	MCH	ISF	TOL	DSF				158th	80	
2005	Darrell Basham Racing	94	Chevy																					CHI; 35	SLM	TAL	158th	80	
2006	Ken Schrader Racing	99	Dodge	DAY	NSH	SLM	WIN	KEN	TOL	POC; 22	MCH; 33	KAN						MCH; DNQ	ISF	MIL	TOL	DSF	CHI	SLM	TAL	IOW	97th	235	
2006	Bobby Jones Racing	50	Dodge										KEN; DNQ	BLN	POC	GTW	NSH										97th	235	
2007	Sheltra Motorsports	60	Chevy	DAY; DNQ	USA; 11	NSH; 25	SLM; 11	KAN; 12	WIN; 19	KEN; 9	TOL; 28	IOW; 20	POC; 24	MCH; 14	BLN; 4	KEN; 18	POC; 11	NSH; 13	ISF; 3	MIL; 36	GTW; 29	DSF; 6	CHI; 13	SLM; 14	TAL; 16	TOL; 8	7th	4615	
2008	Sheltra Motorsports	60	Chevy	DAY; 15	SLM; 11	IOW; 9		CAR; 34	KEN; 7	TOL; 2			CAY; 18		BLN; 26						SLM; 11	NJE; 11	TAL; 5	TOL; 4			6th	4580	
2008	Sheltra Motorsports	60	Dodge				KAN; 8				POC; 33	MCH; 6		KEN; 31		POC; DNQ	NSH; 10	ISF; 12	DSF; 2	CHI; 31							6th	4580	
2009	Sheltra Motorsports	60	Dodge	DAY; 14	**SLM**; 1	CAR; 2	TAL; 33	KEN; 26		POC; 13		MFD; 21	IOW; 14	KEN; 9		POC; 14	ISF; 3	CHI; 13		DSF; 31		SLM; 16	KAN; 11				9th	4485	
2009	Sheltra Motorsports	60	Chevy						TOL; 29						BLN; 14				TOL; 17		NJE; 7						9th	4485	
2009	Sheltra Motorsports	60	Toyota								MCH; 33													CAR; 38			9th	4485	
2010	Sheltra Motorsports	60	Dodge	DAY; 5		SLM; 4		TAL; 2	TOL; 8				MFD; 21		BLN; 2		ISF; 1		DSF; 4	**TOL**; 3	SLM; 6						1st	4965	
2010	Sheltra Motorsports	60	Chevy		PBE; 10											NJE; 13											1st	4965	
2010	Sheltra Motorsports	60	Toyota				TEX; 7			POC; 4	MCH; 3	IOW; 29		POC; 6				CHI; 1				KAN; 5	CAR; 4				1st	4965	
2011	Tony Marks Racing	12	Dodge	DAY	TAL	SLM	TOL	NJE	CHI	POC	MCH	WIN	BLN; 4	IOW	IRP	POC	ISF	MAD	DSF	SLM	KAN	TOL					90th	210	

Sporting positions
Preceded by Justin Lofton	ARCA Racing Series champion 2010	Succeeded by Ty Dillon
