= Charlie Vest =

American racing driver

- Born: February 1, 1974 (age 52); Ocoee, Florida, U.S.

NASCAR FedEx Freight Truck Series career
- 2 races run over 1 year
- Best finish: 58th (2011)
- First race: 2011 UNOH 225 (Kentucky)
- Last race: 2011 Good Sam Club 200 (Atlanta)
Wins	Top tens	Poles
0	0	0

ARCA Menards Series career
- 10 races run over 3 years
- Best finish: 54th (2011)
- First race: 2008 Cayuga ARCA RE/MAX 250 (Jukasa)
- Last race: 2011 Kentuckiana Ford Dealers ARCA Fall Classic (Salem)
Wins	Top tens	Poles
0	0	0
- Statistics up to date as of June 13, 2024.

Charlie Vest (born February 1, 1974) is an American professional stock car racing driver who has previously competed in the NASCAR Camping World Truck Series and the ARCA Racing Series.

Vest made his ARCA Racing Series debut in 2008 at Jukasa Motor Speedway, driving the No. 10 Ford for Fast Track Racing, where he finished 29th due to handling issues. He then made two more starts at the Illinois State Fairgrounds and DuQuoin State Fairgrounds dirt tracks, finishing fourteenth and 34th respectively. Vest then made two starts for Andy Belmont Racing, finishing eighteenth at Kentucky Speedway and 37th at Pocono Raceway.

In 2011, Vest made five ARCA starts for Fast Track Racing, getting a best finish of 22nd at Winchester Speedway. He also made two NASCAR Camping World Truck Series starts, finishing twentieth at Kentucky whilst driving for Chase Mattioli Racing, and 33rd at Atlanta Motor Speedway whilst driving the No. 09 Ford for T3R, LLC.

Vest has also competed in series such as the FASCAR Goodyear Challenge Series, the FAST on Dirt Series, the Ohio Valley Sprint Car Association, and the World Series of Asphalt Stock Car Racing.

Vest is currently the CEO and owner of Atomic Speedway.

== Motorsports results ==
=== NASCAR ===
(key) (Bold – Pole position awarded by qualifying time. Italics – Pole position earned by points standings or practice time. * – Most laps led.)

==== Camping World Truck Series ====
NASCAR Camping World Truck Series results
Year	Team	No.	Make	1	2	3	4	5	6	7	8	9	10	11	12	13	14	15	16	17	18	19	20	21	22	23	24	25	NCWTC	Pts	Ref
2011	Chase Mattioli Racing	99	Ford	DAY	PHO	DAR	MAR	NSH	DOV	CLT	KAN	TEX	KEN; 20	IOW	NSH	IRP	POC	MCH	BRI		CHI; DNQ	NHA	KEN	LVS		MAR; DNQ	TEX	HOM	58th	35	
2011	T3R, LLC	09	Ford																	ATL; 33					TAL; Wth				58th	35	

=== ARCA Racing Series ===
(key) (Bold – Pole position awarded by qualifying time. Italics – Pole position earned by points standings or practice time. * – Most laps led.)

ARCA Racing Series results
Year	Team	No.	Make	1	2	3	4	5	6	7	8	9	10	11	12	13	14	15	16	17	18	19	20	21	ARSC	Pts	Ref
2008	Fast Track Racing	10	Ford	DAY	SLM	IOW	KAN	CAR	KEN	TOL	POC	MCH	CAY; 29	KEN	BLN	POC	NSH								76th	305	
2008	Fast Track Racing	10	Chevy															ISF; 14	DSF; 34	CHI	SLM	NJE	TAL	TOL	76th	305	
2009	Andy Belmont Racing	1	Ford	DAY	SLM	CAR	TAL	KEN	TOL	POC	MCH	MFD	IOW	KEN; 18	BLN										117th	185	
2009	Andy Belmont Racing	83	Ford													POC; 37	ISF	CHI	TOL	DSF	NJE	SLM	KAN	CAR	117th	185	
2011	Fast Track Racing	10	Ford	DAY	TAL; 34	SLM	TOL	NJE	CHI	POC	MCH														54th	450	
2011	Fast Track Racing	10	Chevy									WIN; 22	BLN	IOW	IRP	POC									54th	450	
2011	Fast Track Racing	14	Dodge														ISF; 25	MAD							54th	450	
2011	Fast Track Racing	18	Chevy																DSF; 30	SLM; 29	KAN	TOL			54th	450	
