= Chad McCumbee =

American stock car racing driver

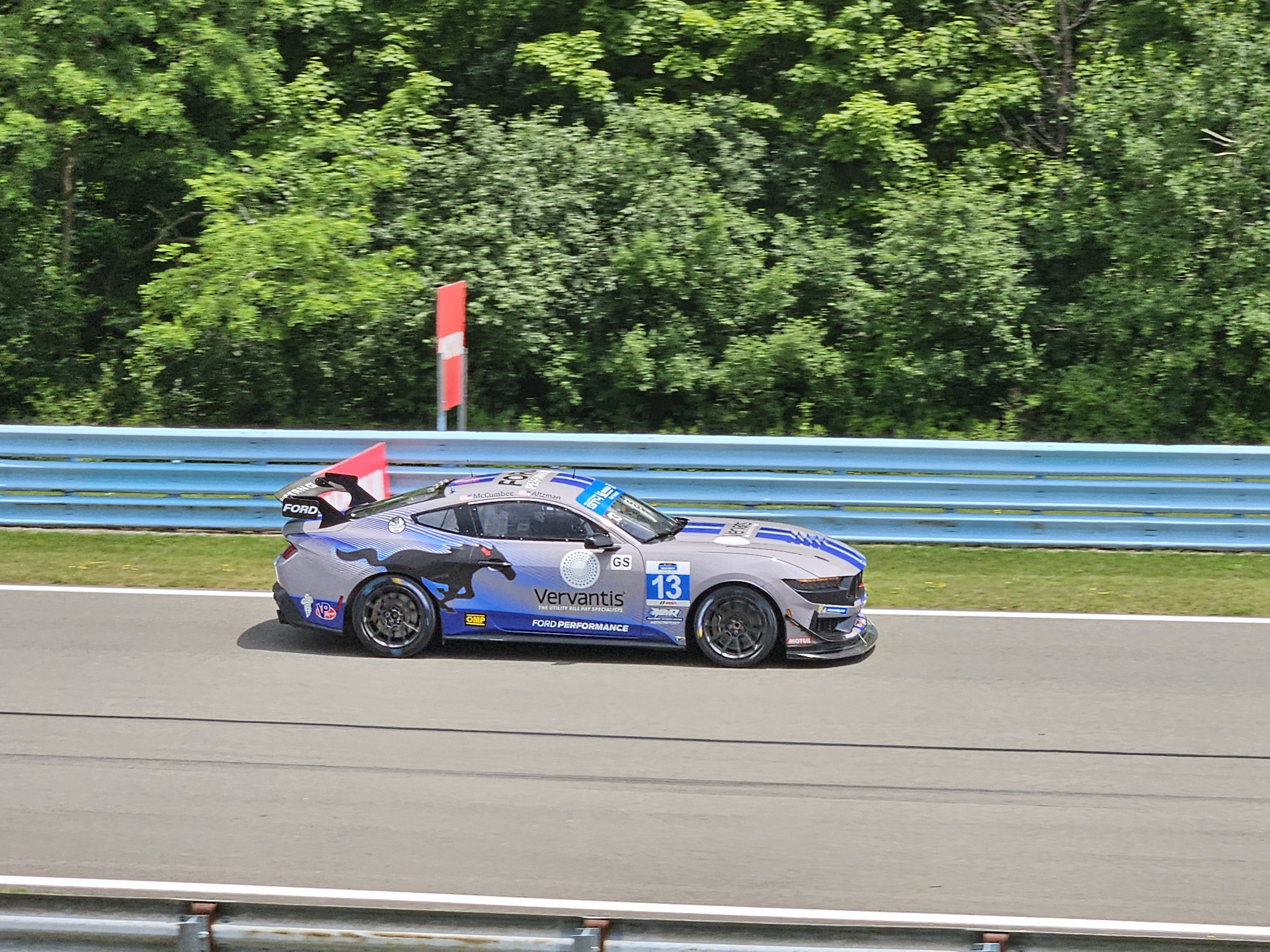
- Born: October 15, 1984 (age 42); Supply, North Carolina, U.S.
- Achievements: 2001, 2002 Allison Legacy Series National Champion; 2015 Continental Tire Sportscar Challenge ST Champion

NASCAR Cup Series career
- 10 races run over 3 years
- Best finish: 52nd (2008)
- First race: 2007 Pocono 500 (Pocono)
- Last race: 2010 AMP Energy Juice 500 (Talladega)
Wins	Top tens	Poles
0	0	0

NASCAR O'Reilly Auto Parts Series career
- 4 races run over 1 year
- Best finish: 85th (2010)
- First race: 2010 O'Reilly Auto Parts 300 (Texas)
- Last race: 2010 TECH-NET Auto Service 300 (Charlotte)
Wins	Top tens	Poles
0	0	0

NASCAR FedEx Freight Truck Series career
- 105 races run over 8 years
- 2013 position: 79th
- Best finish: 11th (2008)
- First race: 2006 racetickets.com 200 (California)
- Last race: 2013 Ford EcoBoost 200 (Homestead)
Wins	Top tens	Poles
0	17	0
- Statistics up to date as of November 15, 2013.

Chad McCumbee (born October 15, 1984) is an American professional stock car racing driver. He is a co-owner and driver for McCumbee-McAleer Racing in the Michelin Pilot Challenge, the team also competes in the Mazda MX-5 Cup and the IMSA Ford Mustang Challenge. He also owns and drives for Chad McCumbee Racing, a Late Model Stock Car team that competes in the CARS Tour, Virginia Triple Crown, and other big LMSC events. He is also known for his portrayal of Dale Earnhardt Jr. in 3: The Dale Earnhardt Story.

== Early career ==
McCumbee began his career racing go-karts at the age of ten. He has more than one-hundred victories in local, regional and national World Karting Association Dirt Series events, all which he accomplished in the five-year span from 1995 to 2000. He was also Allison Legacy Series National and Regional championship along with Rookie of the Year in his very first full season in the series in 2001. He also won the 2002 national title becoming the first and so far only two-time champion of the series. In 2003, he started late model racing at Myrtle Beach Speedway, and became the youngest rookie winner at the track.

McCumbee made his ARCA RE/MAX Series in 2004 at Michigan International Speedway for Hillenburg, but flipped the No. 10 Fast Track Driving School Chevy in spectacular fashion after 21 laps and finished 37th. He finished fourth in the point standings in 2005, his first full year of competition, continuing to drive for Hillenburg, winning one pole and gathering ten top-ten finishes.

== NASCAR ==
McCumbee moved to the NASCAR Craftsman Truck Series in 2006, initially as driver of the No. 06 Chevrolet Silverado for MRD Motorsports. After failing to qualify for the season opening event at Daytona International Speedway, he had two consecutive top-fifteen finishes before MRD closed, moving him to the No. 08 Green Light Racing Chevy owned by Bobby Dotter. He finished ninth in his first race with the team at Texas Motor Speedway, and split time in the next five races between Green Light's No. 07 and No. 08 entries with occasional sponsorship from U.S. Restoration, before moving to the No. 08 permanently with Garmin/The GPS Store as sponsor. He had two seventh-place finishes through the year and finished seventeenth in season points. During the season, he briefly was a member of Chevrolet's driver development program, but his contract was not renewed at the end of the season.

McCumbee drove first 15 Craftsman Truck Series races in the 2007 season for Green Light Racing. his best finish with Green Light was 13th twice at Daytona and Dover. On August 14, he left Green Light Racing, and on the 20th announced he would drive for MRD Motorsports replacing Blake Bjorklund with The GPS Store and Garmin coming with him to sponsor the No. 8. With The No. 8 team, he scored his first top ten of the year at Las Vegas. McCumbee took the truck to a near upset victory at Texas before spinning his tires on a restart which led to being wrecked while leading with two laps to go and he finished thirteenth. On 2 May 2007, Petty Enterprises announced McCumbee would make his NEXTEL Cup debut, filling in for Kyle Petty while he was in the TNT broadcast booth, for one race at Pocono on 10 June 2007 in the Pocono 500. Goody's Cool Orange Headache Powders sponsored the car, and McCumbee finished 25th in that race. Petty tabbed him again for Michigan in the 3M Performance 400 because of Petty's broken hand. Clutch problems after a spin and forced the team behind the wall for more than fifty laps resulting in a 41st place finish. He also won his first two ARCA races, at Nashville Superspeedway and Pocono Raceway respectively, driving for Andy Belmont.

McCumbee started the 2008 season with a seventh at Daytona, and had a then career-best finish of fifth at Atlanta, before picking up his career best finish of second place at Charlotte in the Malcomson Construction truck. He ended the season 11th in the points standings. He also continued to run part-time for Petty's No. 45 entry with Marathon American Spirit Motor Oil sponsoring, making a total of six starts but failing to qualify on three occasions. His best finish was seventeenth at Pocono. He was the top choice for Kyle Petty's replacement in the No. 45, and signed a contract to drive for Petty full-time in 2009. A deal was made to merge Gillett Evernham Motorsports and Petty Enterprises which formed Richard Petty Motorsports, and as a result, McCumbee lost his Sprint Cup ride.

For the 2009 Camping World Truck Series season, McCumbee rejoined SS-Green Light Racing to be driver of the No. 7 Chevy with sponsorship from ASI Limited and The GPS Store. He had two top-ten finishes early in the season, and despite funding from Tiwi and Valvoline, he was replaced for four races during the season by other drivers bringing funding, and fell to nineteenth in points. He reunited with Hillenburg to drive the No. 49 Fast Track Racing truck for two races in 2010. In April 2010, McCumbee made his NASCAR Nationwide Series debut at Texas Motor Speedway. Driving the No. 09 Ford for RAB Racing, he finished 31st after starting 20th. Also in April, it was announced that McCumbee had signed with Andy Belmont to run the remainder of the 2010 ARCA Remax Series season in the No.1 Ford.

McCumbee then moved to sports cars, driving in the Continental Tire SportsCar Challenge for C.J. Wilson. He won the 2015 championship in the ST division with co-driver Stevan McAleer.

== Motorsports career results ==
=== Stock car career summary ===
Season	Series	Team	Races	Wins	Top 5	Top 10	Points	Position
2004	ARCA Re/Max Series	Fast Track Racing	1	0	0	0	45	185th
2005	ARCA Re/Max Series	Fast Track Racing	23	0	7	10	4720	4th
2006	ARCA Re/Max Series	Fast Track Racing	4	0	1	1	515	66th
2006	NASCAR Craftsman Truck Series	MRD Motorsports	7	0	0	0	2515	17th
2006	NASCAR Craftsman Truck Series	Green Light Racing	17	0	0	3	2515	17th
2007	ARCA Re/Max Series	Andy Belmont Racing	4	1	1	1	650	49th
2007	ARCA Re/Max Series	Petty Enterprises	1	1	1	1	650	49th
2007	NASCAR Craftsman Truck Series	Green Light Racing	14	0	0	0	2172	18th
2007	NASCAR Craftsman Truck Series	MRD Motorsports	8	0	0	1	2172	18th
2007	NASCAR Nextel Cup Series	Petty Enterprises	2	0	0	0	128	61st
2008	ARCA Re/Max Series	Fast Track Racing	1	0	0	1	200	95th
2008	NASCAR Craftsman Truck Series	MRD Motorsports	25	0	2	8	2999	11th
2008	NASCAR Sprint Cup Series	Petty Enterprises	6	0	0	0	396	52nd
2009	NASCAR Camping World Truck Series	SS-Green Light Racing	21	0	1	5	2410	19th
2010	ARCA Racing Series	Mark Gibson Racing	1	0	0	0	3280	15th
2010	ARCA Racing Series	Andy Belmont Racing	16	0	0	7	3280	15th
2010	NASCAR Camping World Truck Series	Fast Track Racing	3	0	0	0	340	60th
2010	NASCAR Camping World Truck Series	SS-Green Light Racing	1	0	0	0	340	60th
2010	NASCAR Camping World Truck Series	FDNY Racing	1	0	0	0	340	60th
2010	NASCAR Nationwide Series	RAB Racing	4	0	0	0	295	85th
2010	NASCAR Sprint Cup Series	Gunselman Motorsports	1	0	0	0	134	61st
2010	NASCAR Sprint Cup Series	TRG Motorsports	1	0	0	0	134	61st
2011	ARCA Racing Series	Andy Belmont Racing	19	1	4	15	4465	5th
2011	NASCAR Camping World Truck Series	Chase Mattioli Racing	1	0	0	0	27	62nd
2011	NASCAR Camping World Truck Series	Eddie Sharp Racing	0	0	0	0	27	62nd
2011	NASCAR Camping World Truck Series	SS-Green Light Racing	1	0	0	0	27	62nd
2012	NASCAR Camping World Truck Series	Turn One Racing	2	0	0	0	92	42nd
2012	NASCAR Camping World Truck Series	RBR Enterprises	3	0	0	0	92	42nd
2013	NASCAR Camping World Truck Series	T3R2	1	0	0	0	11	79th
2015	CARS Late Model Stock Car Tour	McCumbee Elliott Racing	1	0	0	0	19	46th
2016	CARS Super Late Model Tour	McCumbee Elliott Racing	1	0	0	1	24	46th
2016	CARS Late Model Stock Car Tour	McCumbee Elliott Racing	3	0	1	3	86	18th
2017	CARS Super Late Model Tour	McCumbee Elliott Racing	3	0	0	2	62	22nd
2018	CARS Super Late Model Tour	McCumbee Elliott Racing	1	0	0	0	0	N/A
2018	CARS Late Model Stock Car Tour	McCumbee Elliott Racing	1	0	0	0	5	82nd
2019	CARS Late Model Stock Car Tour	McCumbee Elliott Racing	3	0	0	2	72	25th
2020	CARS Late Model Stock Car Tour	McCumbee Elliott Racing	10	0	2	4	210	8th
2022	CARS Late Model Stock Car Tour	McCumbee Elliott Racing	15	1	4	7	323	5th
2023	CARS Late Model Stock Car Tour	McCumbee Elliott Racing	16	0	2	10	357	6th
2024	CARS Late Model Stock Car Tour	McCumbee Elliott Racing	11	0	2	6	215	16th
2025	CARS Late Model Stock Car Tour	McCumbee Elliott Racing	12	0	2	3	310	16th
2026	CARS Late Model Stock Car Tour	McCumbee Elliott Racing	14	0	2	9	430	4th

=== NASCAR ===
(key) (Bold – Pole position awarded by qualifying time. Italics – Pole position earned by points standings or practice time. * – Most laps led.)

==== Sprint Cup Series ====
NASCAR Sprint Cup Series results
Year	Team	No.	Make	1	2	3	4	5	6	7	8	9	10	11	12	13	14	15	16	17	18	19	20	21	22	23	24	25	26	27	28	29	30	31	32	33	34	35	36	NSCC	Pts	Ref
2007	Petty Enterprises	45	Dodge	DAY	CAL	LVS	ATL	BRI	MAR	TEX	PHO	TAL	RCH	DAR	CLT	DOV	POC; 25	MCH	SON	NHA	DAY	CHI	IND	POC	GLN	MCH; 41	BRI	CAL	RCH	NHA	DOV	KAN	TAL	CLT	MAR	ATL	TEX	PHO	HOM	61st	128	
2008	Petty Enterprises	45	Dodge	DAY	CAL	LVS	ATL	BRI	MAR	TEX; DNQ	PHO	TAL	RCH	DAR	CLT	DOV; DNQ	POC	MCH	SON	NHA	DAY	CHI	IND	POC; 17	GLN	MCH	BRI	CAL	RCH	NHA; 42	DOV	KAN	TAL	CLT; 35	MAR; 25	ATL; 35	TEX; DNQ	PHO	HOM; 36	52nd	396	
2010	Gunselman Motorsports	64	Toyota	DAY	CAL	LVS	ATL	BRI	MAR	PHO	TEX	TAL	RCH	DAR	DOV	CLT	POC; 42	MCH	SON	NHA	DAY	CHI	IND	POC	GLN	MCH	BRI	ATL	RCH	NHA	DOV	KAN	CAR	CLT	MAR					61st	134	
2010	TRG Motorsports	71	Chevy																																	TAL; 22	TEX	PHO	HOM	61st	134	

==== Nationwide Series ====
NASCAR Nationwide Series results
Year	Team	No.	Make	1	2	3	4	5	6	7	8	9	10	11	12	13	14	15	16	17	18	19	20	21	22	23	24	25	26	27	28	29	30	31	32	33	34	35	NNSC	Pts	Ref
2010	RAB Racing	09	Ford	DAY	CAL	LVS	BRI	NSH	PHO	TEX; 31	TAL	RCH	DAR; 28	DOV; 32	CLT; 27	NSH	KEN	ROA	NHA	DAY	CHI	GTY	IRP	IOW	GLN	MCH	BRI	CGV	ATL	RCH	DOV	KAN	CAL	CLT	GTY	TEX	PHO	HOM	85th	298	

==== Camping World Truck Series ====
NASCAR Camping World Truck Series results
Year	Team	No.	Make	1	2	3	4	5	6	7	8	9	10	11	12	13	14	15	16	17	18	19	20	21	22	23	24	25	NCWTC	Pts	Ref
2006	MRD Motorsports	06	Chevy	DAY; DNQ	CAL; 25	ATL; 27	MAR; 21	GTY; 11	CLT; 15	MFD; 31	DOV; 23																		17th	2515	
2006	Green Light Racing	08	Chevy									TEX; 9	MCH; 18		KAN; 13	KEN; 18		IRP; 17	NSH; 7	BRI; 25	NHA; 20	LVS; 34	TAL; 30	MAR; 27	ATL; 7	TEX; 13	PHO; 29	HOM; 13	17th	2515	
2006	Green Light Racing	07	Chevy											MLW; 14			MEM; 22												17th	2515	
2007	Green Light Racing	08	Chevy	DAY; 13	CAL; 27	ATL; 18	MAR; 24	KAN; 27	CLT; 18	MFD; 14	DOV; 13	TEX	MCH; 19	MLW; 23	MEM; 26	KEN; 20	IRP; 34	NSH; 32											18th	2172	
2007	MRD Motorsports	8	Chevy																BRI; 35	GTW; 15	NHA; 26	LVS; 10	TAL; 24	MAR	ATL; 27	TEX; 13	PHO	HOM; 22	18th	2172	
2008	MRD Motorsports	8	Chevy	DAY; 7	CAL; 18	ATL; 5	MAR; 32	KAN; 7	CLT; 2	MFD; 24	DOV; 12	TEX; 6	MCH; 9	MLW; 27	MEM; 15	KEN; 30	IRP; 31	NSH; 10	BRI; 11	GTW; 11	NHA; 11	LVS; 11	TAL; 10	MAR; 24	ATL; 15	TEX; 23	PHO; 12	HOM; 13	11th	2999	
2009	SS-Green Light Racing	07	Chevy	DAY; 19	CAL; 3	ATL; 6	MAR; 28	KAN; 8	CLT; 15	DOV; 7	TEX; 13	MCH; 24	MLW; 25	MEM	KEN; 11	IRP; 32	NSH	BRI; 27	CHI; 7	IOW; 15	GTW	NHA; 29	LVS; 16	MAR	TAL; 24	TEX; 20	PHO; 15	HOM; 11	19th	2410	
2010	Fast Track Racing	49	Chevy	DAY; 33	ATL; 35	MAR	NSH	KAN	DOV	CLT	TEX																		60th	340	
2010	SS-Green Light Racing	21	Dodge									MCH; 30																	60th	340	
2010	Fast Track Racing	48	Chevy										IOW; 31	GTY	IRP														60th	340	
2010	FDNY Racing	28	Chevy													POC; 31	NSH	DAR	BRI	CHI	KEN	NHA	LVS	MAR	TAL	TEX	PHO	HOM	60th	340	
2011	Chase Mattioli Racing	99	Ford	DAY; 35	PHO																								62nd	27	
2011	Eddie Sharp Racing	45	Toyota			DAR; DNQ	MAR	NSH	DOV	CLT	KAN	TEX	KEN	IOW	NSH	IRP													62nd	27	
2011	SS-Green Light Racing	07	Toyota														POC; 26	MCH	BRI	ATL	CHI	NHA	KEN	LVS	TAL	MAR	TEX	HOM	62nd	27	
2012	Turn One Racing	60	Chevy	DAY	MAR	CAR	KAN; 30	CLT; 31	DOV	TEX	KEN	IOW																	42nd	92	
2012	RBR Enterprises	92	Chevy										CHI; 20	POC	MCH	BRI; 23	ATL; 25	IOW	KEN	LVS	TAL	MAR	TEX	PHO	HOM				42nd	92	
2013	T3R2	99	Ford	DAY	MAR	CAR	KAN	CLT	DOV	TEX	KEN	IOW	ELD	POC	MCH	BRI	MSP	IOW	CHI	LVS	TAL	MAR	TEX	PHO	HOM; 33				79th	11	

=== ARCA Racing Series ===
(key) (Bold – Pole position awarded by qualifying time. Italics – Pole position earned by points standings or practice time. * – Most laps led.)

ARCA Racing Series results
Year	Team	No.	Make	1	2	3	4	5	6	7	8	9	10	11	12	13	14	15	16	17	18	19	20	21	22	23	ARSC	Pts	Ref
2004	Fast Track Racing	10	Pontiac	DAY	NSH	SLM	KEN	TOL	CLT	KAN	POC	MCH; 37	SBO	BLN	KEN	GTW	POC	LER	NSH	ISF	TOL	DSF	CHI	SLM	TAL		185th	45	
2005	Fast Track Racing	11	Chevy	DAY; 22	NSH; 22	**SLM**; 20	KEN; 18			MIL; 31	POC; 4	MCH; 9	KAN; 10	KEN; 12	BLN; 32	POC; 2	GTW; 4	LER; 4	NSH; 5	MCH; 5	ISF; 19	TOL; 35	DSF; 5	CHI; 29	SLM; 9	TAL; 41	4th	4720	
2005	Fast Track Racing	11	Pontiac					TOL; 14	LAN; 24																		4th	4720	
2006	Fast Track Racing	11	Chevy	DAY; 28	NSH; 40	SLM	WIN	KEN	TOL	POC	MCH	KAN	KEN	BLN	POC; 3	GTW	NSH	MCH	ISF	MIL							66th	515	
2006	Fast Track Racing	1	Chevy																		TOL; 14	DSF	CHI	SLM	TAL	IOW	66th	515	
2007	Andy Belmont Racing	62	Chevy	DAY; 31	USA; 38	NSH; 1	SLM; 26	KAN	WIN	KEN	TOL	IOW															49th	650	
2007	Petty Enterprises	62	Dodge										POC; 1	MCH	BLN	KEN	POC	NSH	ISF	MIL	GTW	DSF	CHI	SLM	TAL	TOL	49th	650	
2008	Fast Track Racing	10	Chevy	DAY	SLM	IOW	KAN	CAR; 6	KEN	TOL	POC	MCH	CAY	KEN	BLN	POC	NSH	ISF	DSF	CHI	SLM	NJE	TAL	TOL			95th	200	
2010	Mark Gibson Racing	59	Chevy	DAY	PBE	SLM	TEX; 36																				15th	3280	
2010	Andy Belmont Racing	1	Ford					TAL; 33	TOL; 22	POC; 15	MCH; 17	IOW; 16	MFD; 6	POC; 17	BLN; 10	NJE; 17	ISF; 13	CHI; 33	DSF; 8	TOL; 8	SLM; 8	KAN; 9	CAR; 8				15th	3280	
2011	Andy Belmont Racing	1	Ford	DAY; 8	TAL; 20	SLM; 9	TOL; 7	NJE; 3	CHI; 4	POC; 6	MCH; 8	WIN; 7	BLN; 15	IOW; 21	IRP; 7	POC; 26	ISF; 1*	MAD; 10	DSF; 7	SLM; 9	KAN; 8	TOL; 3					5th	4465	

=== CARS Late Model Stock Car Tour ===
(key) (Bold – Pole position awarded by qualifying time. Italics – Pole position earned by points standings or practice time. * – Most laps led. ** – All laps led.)

CARS Late Model Stock Car Tour results
Year	Team	No.	Make	1	2	3	4	5	6	7	8	9	10	11	12	13	14	15	16	17	CLMSCTC	Pts	Ref
2015	McCumbee Elliott Racing	21	Ford	SNM	ROU	HCY	SNM	TCM; 14	MMS	ROU	CON	MYB	HCY								46th	19	
2016	McCumbee Elliott Racing	95	Ford	SNM; 6	ROU	HCY	TCM; 7	GRE; 2*	ROU	CON	MYB	HCY	SNM								18th	86	
2018	McCumbee Elliott Racing	16M	Ford	TCM; 28	MYB	ROU	HCY	BRI	ACE	CCS	KPT	HCY	WKS	ROU	SBO						82nd	5	
2019	McCumbee Elliott Racing	16	Ford	SNM; 14	HCY	ROU	ACE	MMS; 6	LGY	DOM	**CCS**; 10*	HCY	ROU	SBO							25th	72	
2020	McCumbee Elliott Racing	16	Ford	SNM; 19	ACE; 25	HCY; 14	HCY; 5	DOM; 13	FCS; 12	LGY; 10	CCS; 13	FLO; 3	GRE; 8								8th	210	
2022	McCumbee Elliott Racing	16	Ford	CRW; 18	**HCY**; 1*	GPS; 6	AAS; 3	FCS; 9	LGY; 3	DOM; 20		ACE; 2	MMS; 17	NWS; 15	TCM; 9	ACE; 15	SBO; 29	CRW; 19			5th	323	
2022	McCumbee Elliott Racing	1C	Ford								HCY; 14										5th	323	
2023	McCumbee Elliott Racing	16	Ford	SNM; 11	FLC; 11	HCY; 4	ACE; 11	NWS; 7	LGY; 7	DOM; 8	CRW; 26		ACE; 12	TCM; 27	WKS; 5	AAS; 7	SBO; 10	TCM; 8	CRW; 9		6th	357	
2023	McCumbee Elliott Racing	00	Ford									HCY; 9									6th	357	
2024	McCumbee Elliott Racing	16	Ford	**SNM**; 26	HCY; 3*	AAS; 6	OCS; 22	ACE; 5	TCM; 9	LGY; 7	DOM; 25	CRW; 17	HCY	NWS	ACE; 6	WCS	FLC; 17	SBO	TCM	NWS	16th	215	
2025	McCumbee Elliott Racing	16	Ford	AAS; 19	WCS; 7	CDL; 11	OCS; 20	ACE	NWS	LGY; 3	DOM; 5	CRW; 11	HCY; 25	AND	FLC; 24	SBO; 27	**TCM**; 23	NWS; 25			16th	310	
2026	McCumbee Elliott Racing	16M	Ford	SNM; 4	WCS; 22	NSV; 10	CRW; 10	ACE; 16	LGY; 18	DOM; 5	NWS; 8	HCY; 9	AND; 6	FLC; 17	TCM; 6	NPS; 10	SBO; 20				4th	430	

=== CARS Super Late Model Tour ===
(key)

CARS Super Late Model Tour results
Year	Team	No.	Make	1	2	3	4	5	6	7	8	9	10	11	12	13	CSLMTC	Pts	Ref
2016	McCumbee Elliott Racing	16C	Chevy	SNM	ROU	HCY	TCM	GRE	ROU	CON	MYB; 10	HCY	SNM				46th	24	
2017	McCumbee Elliott Racing	16M	Chevy	CON	DOM; 7	DOM; 6	HCY	HCY	BRI	AND; 24	ROU	TCM	ROU	HCY	CON	SBO	22nd	62	
2018	McCumbee Elliott Racing	16M	Chevy	MYB	NSH	ROU	HCY	BRI	AND; 16	HCY	ROU	SBO					N/A	0	

=== Complete British GT Championship results ===
(key) (Races in bold indicate pole position) (Races in italics indicate fastest lap)

Year	Team	Car	Class	1	2	3	4	5	6	7	8	9	DC	Points
2019	Multimatic Motorsports	Ford Mustang GT4	GT4	OUL; 1; 15	OUL; 2; 20	SNE; 1	SNE; 2	SIL; 27	DON	SPA	BRH	DON	18th	16
