= Nick Hoffman (racing driver) =

American racing driver (born 1992)

- Born: May 1, 1992 (age 34) Mooresville, North Carolina, U.S.

Late model career
- Debut season: 2017
- Car number: 2, 9
- Wins: 20+

Previous series
- 2007-present Car number Wins: Modified racing 2; 100+

Championship titles
- 2016, 2017, 2018, 2019, 2020, 2021, 2022 DIRTcar Nationals UMP Modified Champion; 2016, 2019, 2020, 2021, 2022 DIRTcar Summit Racing Equipment Modified Nationals Champion

Awards
- 2023 World of Outlaws Late Model Series Rookie of the Year
- Achievements: 2026 World 100; 2018, 2019, 2021 Drydene Performance World Short Track Championship UMP Modified Winner; 2018, 2021 Drydene Performance World Short Track Championship UMP Modifieds All-Star Invitational Winner

NASCAR FedEx Freight Truck Series career
- 4 races run over 3 years
- 2018 position: 64th
- Best finish: 61st (2011)
- First race: 2010 AAA Insurance 200 (LOR)
- Last race: 2018 Eldora Dirt Derby (Eldora)
Wins	Top tens	Poles
0	1	0

Nick Hoffman (born May 1, 1992) is an American professional racing driver, chassis builder, and businessman. He currently competes full-time in the World of Outlaws Late Model Series, driving the No. 9 Longhorn Chassis for Tye Twarog Racing. He has also previously driven in the NASCAR Camping World Truck Series.

== Racing career ==
=== Early career ===
Hoffman began racing open-wheel dirt modifieds in his hometown Belleville, Illinois, region. In 2012 he founded his own dirt modified manufacturing business, Elite Chassis, in Mooresville, North Carolina. Hoffman is a three-time United Midwestern Promoters (UMP) Modified National Champion.as well as a five-time DIRTcar Summer Nationals Champion (2016, 2019-2022), topping the series’ win list with 69 feature victories.

=== Late Models ===
Hoffman, the 2023 World of Outlaws Late Model Series Rookie of the Year, has made more than 300 dirt late model national tour starts highlighted by over 20 feature wins on top of more than 100 top five and 150 top 10 finishes. In 2022 Hoffman served as the house car driver for Barry Wright Race Cars.

In September 2026 it was announced that he would field a full-time dirt late-model entry for Spire Motorsports.

=== NASCAR Camping World Truck Series ===
Hoffman made his racing debut in 2010, where he drove the No. 63 Ford for MB Motorsports. Hoffman ran two races in 2011, staying in the No. 63. He finished 34th at Nashville and 25th at Kansas.

In 2018, Hoffman returned to NASCAR, driving the No. 83 for MB Motorsports in the Eldora Dirt Derby, where he had a career best finish of tenth.

== Motorsports career results ==
=== NASCAR ===
(key) (Bold – Pole position awarded by qualifying time. Italics – Pole position earned by points standings or practice time. * – Most laps led.)

==== Camping World Truck Series ====
NASCAR Camping World Truck Series results
Year	Team	No.	Make	1	2	3	4	5	6	7	8	9	10	11	12	13	14	15	16	17	18	19	20	21	22	23	24	25	NCWTC	Pts	Ref
2010	MB Motorsports	63	Ford	DAY	ATL	MAR	NSH	KAN	DOV	CLT	TEX	MCH	IOW	GTW	IRP; 23	POC	NSH	DAR	BRI	CHI	KEN	NHA	LVS	MAR	TAL	TEX	PHO	HOM	102nd	94	
2011	MB Motorsports	63	Ford	DAY	PHO	DAR	MAR	NSH; 34	DOV	CLT	KAN; 25	TEX	KEN	IOW	NSH	IRP	POC	MCH	BRI	ATL	CHI	NHA	KEN	LVS	TAL	MAR	TEX	HOM	61st	29	
2018	MB Motorsports	83	Chevy	DAY	ATL	LVS	MAR	DOV	KAN	CLT	TEX	IOW	GTW	CHI	KEN	ELD; 10	POC	MCH	BRI	MSP	LVS	TAL	MAR	TEX	PHO	HOM			64th	27	

^{*} Season still in progress
^{1} Ineligible for series points
