= Wes Burton =

American racing driver

- Born: Wesley Burton; November 4, 1980 (age 46); Chiefland, Florida, U.S.

NASCAR FedEx Freight Truck Series career
- 12 races run over 4 years
- 2012 position: 58th
- Best finish: 45th (2011)
- First race: 2009 MemphisTravel.com 200 (Memphis)
- Last race: 2012 Pocono Mountains 125 (Pocono)
Wins	Top tens	Poles
0	0	0

Wesley Burton (born November 4, 1980) is an American professional stock car racing driver. He has competed part-time in the NASCAR Truck Series, making twelve starts between 2009 and 2012. In his years without a ride in that series, he has occasionally competed in late model racing events, particularly in the PASS Series.

== Racing career ==
=== Late model racing ===
Prior to reaching NASCAR, Burton raced late models, which included when he raced in the ASALMS Southern Division in 2007 for Riddler Racing in the team's No. 5 and No. 57 entries.

Since his last start in NASCAR in 2012, Burton has competed in various late model events, including in the PASS Series in his No. 13 car. In 2016, he competed in the series' race at Anderson Motor Speedway in a No. 5X car and finished seventh. In 2019, he competed in the series' Easter Bunny 150 at Hickory Motor Speedway and finished 27th.

== Personal life ==
He owns Wes Burton Shocks and Performance, which provides those parts and pieces to late model teams. One of the teams that his company works with is the CARS Late Model Stock Tour No. 63 car, which is owned and driven by current part-time NASCAR driver Tyler Matthews.

== Motorsports career results ==
=== Stock car career summary ===
Season	Series	Team	Races	Wins	Top 5	Top 10	Points	Position
2009	NASCAR Camping World Truck Series	Lafferty Motorsports	2	0	0	0	0	113th
2010	NASCAR Camping World Truck Series	Green-Burton Motorsports	4	0	0	0	225	72nd
2011	NASCAR Camping World Truck Series	FDNY Racing	3	0	0	0	73	45th
2011	NASCAR Camping World Truck Series	Pearce Racing	1	0	0	0	73	45th
2012	NASCAR Camping World Truck Series	FDNY Racing	1	0	0	0	37	58th
2012	NASCAR Camping World Truck Series	Pearce Racing	1	0	0	0	37	58th
2026	ASA STARS National Tour	N/A	0	0	0	0		

=== NASCAR ===
(key) (Bold – Pole position awarded by qualifying time. Italics – Pole position earned by points standings or practice time. * – Most laps led.)

==== Camping World Truck Series ====
NASCAR Camping World Truck Series results
Year	Team	No.	Make	1	2	3	4	5	6	7	8	9	10	11	12	13	14	15	16	17	18	19	20	21	22	23	24	25	NCWTC	Pts	Ref
2009	Lafferty Motorsports	89	Chevy	DAY	CAL	ATL	MAR	KAN	CLT	DOV	TEX	MCH	MLW	MEM; 29	KEN	IRP	NSH; 25	BRI	CHI	IOW	GTW	NHA	LVS	MAR	TAL	TEX	PHO	HOM	113th	-	
2010	Green-Burton Motorsports	16	Chevy	DAY	ATL	MAR	NSH	KAN; 35	DOV	CLT; 34	TEX	MCH	IOW	GTW	IRP	POC	NSH	DAR	BRI	CHI	KEN	NHA	LVS	MAR; 20	TAL	TEX; 34	PHO	HOM	72nd	225	
2011	FDNY Racing	28	Chevy	DAY	PHO	DAR	MAR	NSH	DOV	CLT; 33	KAN	TEX	KEN	IOW	NSH	IRP	POC; 23	MCH	BRI	ATL	CHI				TAL; 24	MAR	TEX	HOM	45th	73	
2011	Pearce Racing	61	Ford																			NHA; 23	KEN	LVS					45th	73	
2012	FDNY Racing	28	Chevy	DAY; DNQ	MAR	CAR; DNQ	KAN	CLT; DNQ						POC; 23	MCH	BRI	ATL	IOW	KEN	LVS	TAL; DNQ	MAR	TEX	PHO	HOM				58th	37	
2012	Pearce Racing	61	Ford						DOV; 28	TEX	KEN	IOW	CHI																58th	37	

=== ASA STARS National Tour ===
(key) (Bold – Pole position awarded by qualifying time. Italics – Pole position earned by points standings or practice time. * – Most laps led. ** – All laps led.)

ASA STARS National Tour results
Year	Team	No.	Make	1	2	3	4	5	6	7	8	9	10	11	ASNTC	Pts	Ref
2026	N/A	13	Chevy	NSM	FIF	HCY; Wth	SLG	MAD	NPS	OWO	TRI	WIN	NSV	NSM	-*	-*	
