= 2011 NASCAR Camping World Truck Series =

American motorsport season

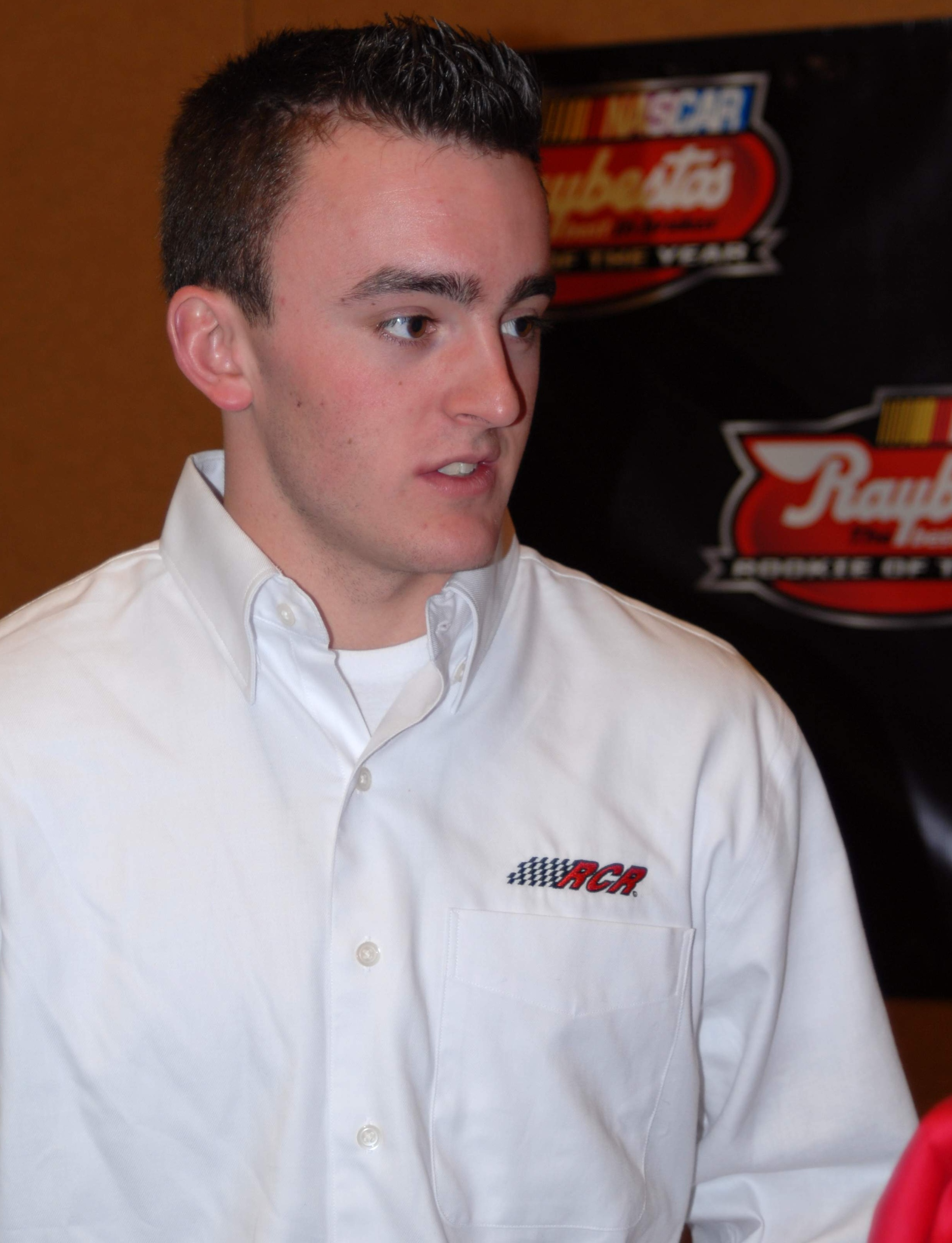
Austin Dillon, the 2011 Camping World Truck Series champion.

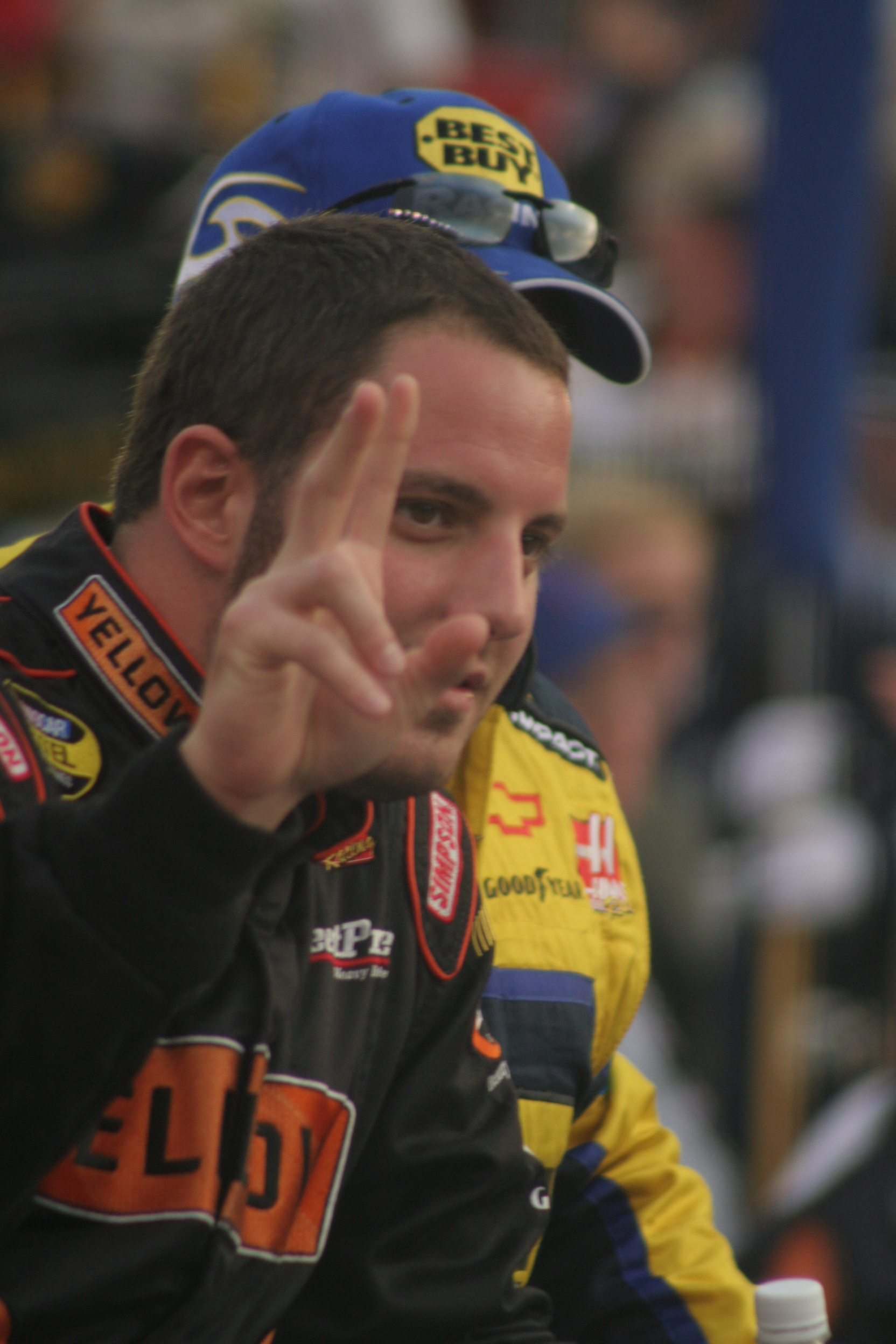
Johnny Sauter came in second behind Dillon.

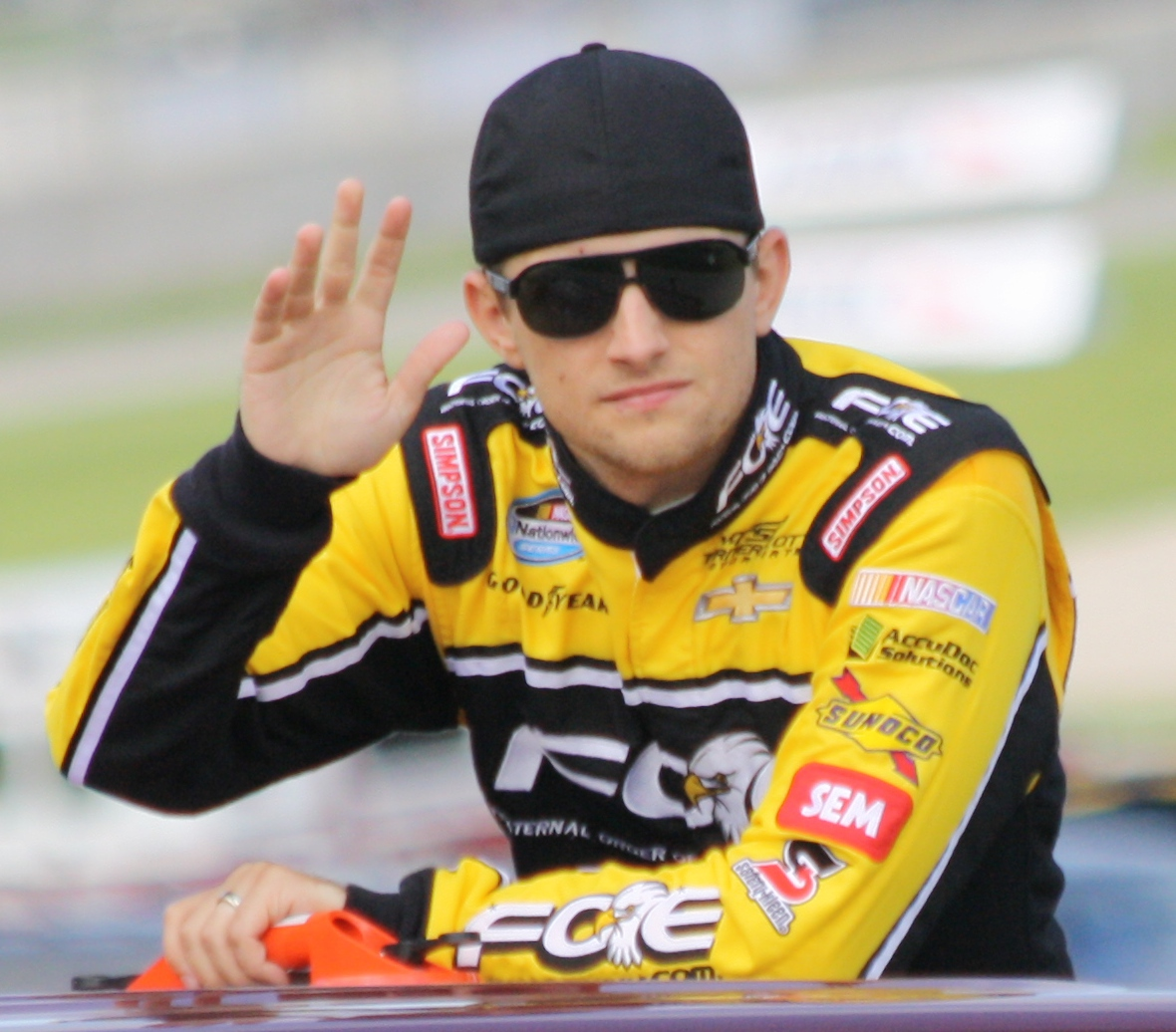
James Buescher finished third in the championship.

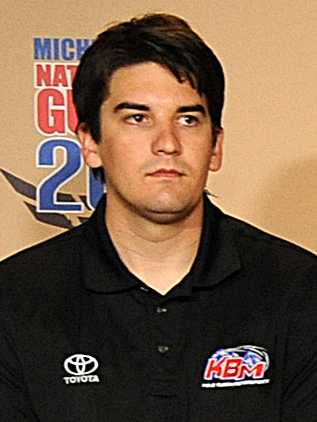
Joey Coulter, the Camping World Truck Series Rookie of the Year.

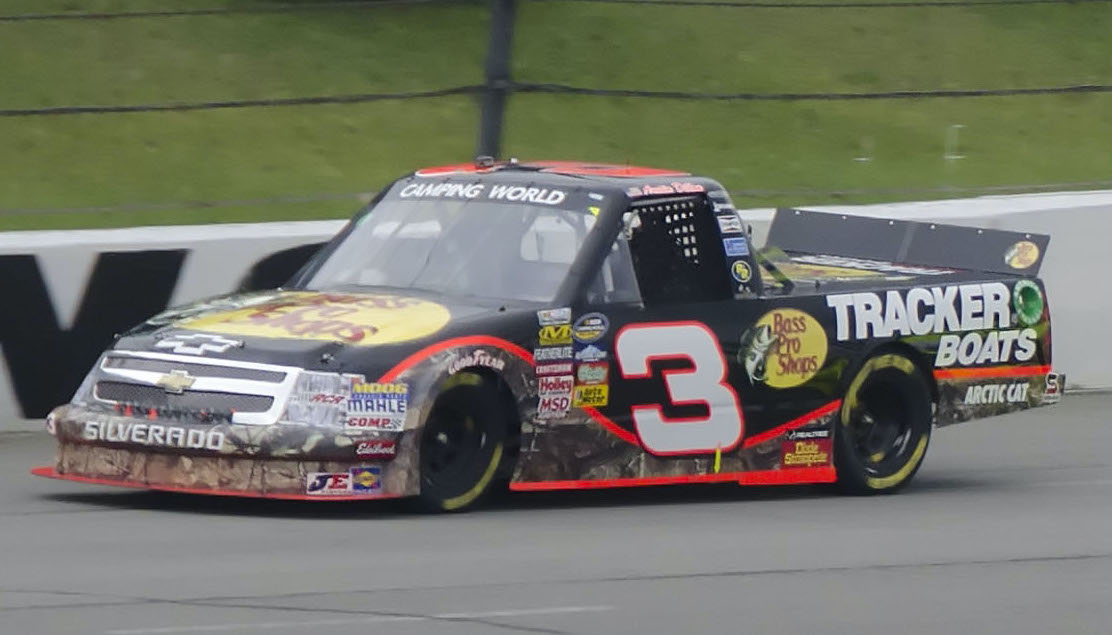
Chevrolet won the manufacturers' championship with 193 points and 15 wins.

The 2011 NASCAR Camping World Truck Series was the seventeenth season of the third highest stock car racing in the United States. The season included twenty-five races, beginning with the NextEra Energy Resources 250 at Daytona International Speedway and ending with the Ford 200 at Homestead-Miami Speedway. During the 2010 season, NASCAR announced a few notable calendar changes, including a race addition at Kentucky Speedway and the removal of Gateway International Raceway from the schedule. DeLana Harvick won the owners' championship, while Austin Dillon of Richard Childress Racing won the drivers' championship with a tenth-place finish at the final race of the season. Chevrolet won the manufacturers' championship with 193 points.

== Teams and drivers ==
=== Complete schedule ===
Manufacturer	Team	No.	Race driver	Crew chief
Chevrolet	Joe Denette Motorsports	23	Jason White	Chad Kendrick 20; Terry Snyder 4 Doug Howe 1
Chevrolet	Kevin Harvick, Inc.	2	Elliott Sadler 5	Bruce Cook
Chevrolet	Kevin Harvick, Inc.	2	Clint Bowyer 4	Bruce Cook
Chevrolet	Kevin Harvick, Inc.	2	Kevin Harvick 10	Bruce Cook
Chevrolet	Kevin Harvick, Inc.	2	Ron Hornaday Jr. 3	Bruce Cook
Chevrolet	Kevin Harvick, Inc.	2	Cale Gale 1	Bruce Cook
Chevrolet	Kevin Harvick, Inc.	2	David Mayhew 2	Bruce Cook
Chevrolet	Kevin Harvick, Inc.	8	Nelson Piquet Jr. (R)	Jeff Hensley
Chevrolet	Kevin Harvick, Inc.	33	Ron Hornaday Jr. 22	Rick Carelli 23; Chris Carrier 2
Chevrolet	Kevin Harvick, Inc.	33	Cale Gale 2	Rick Carelli 23; Chris Carrier 2
Chevrolet	Kevin Harvick, Inc.	33	Mike Wallace 1	Rick Carelli 23; Chris Carrier 2
Chevrolet	Norm Benning Racing	57	Norm Benning	James Dugger
Chevrolet	Richard Childress Racing	3	Austin Dillon	Danny Stockman Jr.
Chevrolet	Richard Childress Racing	22	Joey Coulter (R)	Harold Holly
Chevrolet	RSS Racing	39	Ryan Sieg	Rod Sieg
Chevrolet	RSS Racing	93	Cole Whitt (R) 1	Kris Nicholson
Chevrolet	RSS Racing	93	Shane Sieg 12	Kris Nicholson
Chevrolet	RSS Racing	93	Mike Garvey 3	Kris Nicholson
Chevrolet	RSS Racing	93	Casey Roderick 1	Kris Nicholson
Chevrolet	RSS Racing	93	Dennis Setzer 2	Kris Nicholson
Chevrolet	RSS Racing	93	Josh Wise 1	Kris Nicholson
Chevrolet	RSS Racing	93	B. J. McLeod 4	Kris Nicholson
Chevrolet	RSS Racing	93	Brent Raymer 1	Kris Nicholson
Chevrolet	ThorSport Racing	13	Johnny Sauter	Joe Shear Jr.
Chevrolet	ThorSport Racing	88	Matt Crafton	Bud Haefele
Chevrolet	Turn One Racing	60	Cole Whitt (R)	Marcus Richmond
Chevrolet	Turn One Racing	66	Justin Marks 12	Doug Wolcott 12; Trip Bruce 10; Chris Beeson 3
Chevrolet	Turn One Racing	66	Ross Chastain 4	Doug Wolcott 12; Trip Bruce 10; Chris Beeson 3
Chevrolet	Turn One Racing	66	Peyton Sellers 2	Doug Wolcott 12; Trip Bruce 10; Chris Beeson 3
Chevrolet	Turn One Racing	66	Chris Cockrum 1	Doug Wolcott 12; Trip Bruce 10; Chris Beeson 3
Chevrolet	Turn One Racing	66	J. J. Yeley 3	Doug Wolcott 12; Trip Bruce 10; Chris Beeson 3
Chevrolet	Turn One Racing	66	Max Gresham 3	Doug Wolcott 12; Trip Bruce 10; Chris Beeson 3
Chevrolet	Turner Motorsports	4	Ricky Carmichael	Doug George
Chevrolet	Turner Motorsports	31	James Buescher	Michael Shelton
Chevrolet	Turner Motorsports	32	Brad Sweet 8	Mark Rette
Chevrolet	Turner Motorsports	32	Steve Arpin 5	Mark Rette
Chevrolet	Turner Motorsports	32	Blake Feese 10	Mark Rette
Chevrolet	Turner Motorsports	32	Mark Martin 2	Mark Rette
Ram	Brad Keselowski Racing	29	Parker Kligerman (R)	Jeff Stankiewicz
Toyota	Germain Racing	9	Max Papis	Randy Goss
Toyota	Germain Racing	62	Brendan Gaughan	Bryan Berry
Toyota	Kyle Busch Motorsports	18	Kyle Busch 16	Eric Phillips
Toyota	Kyle Busch Motorsports	18	Kasey Kahne 1	Eric Phillips
Toyota	Kyle Busch Motorsports	18	Brian Ickler 4	Eric Phillips
Toyota	Kyle Busch Motorsports	18	Josh Richards 2	Eric Phillips
Toyota	Kyle Busch Motorsports	18	Denny Hamlin 2	Eric Phillips
Toyota	Randy Moss Motorsports	5	Travis Kvapil 10	Dan Stillman 10; Mike Hillman Jr. 15
Toyota	Randy Moss Motorsports	5	Todd Bodine 15	Dan Stillman 10; Mike Hillman Jr. 15
Toyota	Red Horse Racing	7	Miguel Paludo (R)	Rick Gay
Toyota	Red Horse Racing	17	Timothy Peters	Butch Hylton
Toyota	SS-Green Light Racing	81	David Starr	Jason Miller
Toyota Chevrolet	Eddie Sharp Racing	6 1	Craig Goess 9 (R)	Trip Bruce 9 Daniel Bormann 16
Toyota Chevrolet	Eddie Sharp Racing	6 1	Justin Lofton 16	Trip Bruce 9 Daniel Bormann 16
Toyota Chevrolet	Rick Ware Racing	07	Donnie Neuenberger 1	Butch Miller 1 Troy Smith 24
Toyota Chevrolet	Corrie Stott Racing	07	Jamie Dick 1	Butch Miller 1 Troy Smith 24
Toyota Chevrolet	SS-Green Light Racing	07	B. J. McLeod 1	Butch Miller 1 Troy Smith 24
Toyota Chevrolet	SS-Green Light Racing	07	Caleb Roark 3	Butch Miller 1 Troy Smith 24
Toyota Chevrolet	SS-Green Light Racing	07	Johnny Chapman 8	Butch Miller 1 Troy Smith 24
Toyota Chevrolet	SS-Green Light Racing	07	J. J. Yeley 1	Butch Miller 1 Troy Smith 24
Toyota Chevrolet	SS-Green Light Racing	07	Scott Riggs 1	Butch Miller 1 Troy Smith 24
Toyota Chevrolet	SS-Green Light Racing	07	Ricky Moxley 1	Butch Miller 1 Troy Smith 24
Toyota Chevrolet	SS-Green Light Racing	07	Chad McCumbee 1	Butch Miller 1 Troy Smith 24
Toyota Chevrolet	SS-Green Light Racing	07	Butch Miller 4	Butch Miller 1 Troy Smith 24
Toyota Chevrolet	SS-Green Light Racing	07	John King 2	Butch Miller 1 Troy Smith 24
Toyota Chevrolet	SS-Green Light Racing	07	T. J. Duke 1	Butch Miller 1 Troy Smith 24

=== Part-time schedule ===
Manufacturer	Team	No.	Race driver(s)	Crew chief	Rounds
Chevrolet	B. J. McLeod Motorsports	78	B. J. McLeod	Jamie Jones	2
Chevrolet	BnB Racing	34	Billy Keyes	Darren Beltz	1
Chevrolet	Brad Queen Racing	00	Brad Queen	Travis Sharpe	1
Chevrolet	Corrie Stott Racing	02	Jamie Dick	Corrie Stott	5
Chevrolet	FDNY Racing	28	Grant Enfinger	Dick Rahilly	1
Chevrolet	FDNY Racing	28	Wes Burton	Dick Rahilly	3
Chevrolet	Gene Price Motorsports	44	Greg Pursley	Jerry Pitts Jr. 1 Bill Kimmel Jr. 1	1
Chevrolet	ThorSport Racing	44	Frank Kimmel	Jerry Pitts Jr. 1 Bill Kimmel Jr. 1	1
Chevrolet	ThorSport Racing	98	Dakoda Armstrong	Dan Stillman	7
Chevrolet	ThorSport Racing	98	Justin Marks	Dan Stillman	1
Chevrolet	Jake Crum Racing	01	Jake Crum	Jon Wolfe	2
Chevrolet	Joe Denette Motorsports	24	Elliott Sadler	Ernie Cope 1 Chad Kendrick 1 Jeff Hensley 1	3
Chevrolet	Kevin Harvick, Inc.	21	Elliott Sadler	Ernie Cope 1 Scott Naset 3 Mark Petty 1	1
Chevrolet	Kevin Harvick, Inc.	21	Ty Dillon	Ernie Cope 1 Scott Naset 3 Mark Petty 1	3
Chevrolet	Kevin Harvick, Inc.	21	Cale Gale	Ernie Cope 1 Scott Naset 3 Mark Petty 1	1
Chevrolet	Lafferty Motorsports	89	Chris Lafferty	Scott Kazura	6
Chevrolet	LCS Motorsports	87	Chris Jones	Richard Kahlich	8
Chevrolet	MAKE Motorsports	50	T. J. Bell	Michael Cheek	3
Chevrolet	MAKE Motorsports	55	Jake Crum	Brad Parrott	1
Chevrolet	Norm Benning Racing	75	Greg Seevers	Richard Goad 4 Greg Seevers 1 Kevin Schurtz 1	1
Chevrolet	Norm Benning Racing	75	Mike Harmon	Richard Goad 4 Greg Seevers 1 Kevin Schurtz 1	1
Chevrolet	Norm Benning Racing	75	James Hylton	Richard Goad 4 Greg Seevers 1 Kevin Schurtz 1	1
Chevrolet	Norm Benning Racing	75	J. J. Yeley	Richard Goad 4 Greg Seevers 1 Kevin Schurtz 1	1
Chevrolet	Norm Benning Racing	75	Andrew Ranger	Richard Goad 4 Greg Seevers 1 Kevin Schurtz 1	1
Chevrolet	Norm Benning Racing	75	Bobby Santos III	Richard Goad 4 Greg Seevers 1 Kevin Schurtz 1	1
Chevrolet	Norm Benning Racing	75	Johnny Borneman III	Richard Goad 4 Greg Seevers 1 Kevin Schurtz 1	1
Chevrolet	NTS Motorsports	14	Brennan Newberry	Dan Deeringhoff	2
Chevrolet	Peck Motorsports	96	Todd Peck	Keith Wolfe	4
Chevrolet	RBR Enterprises	92	Clay Rogers	Barry Elvis	15
Chevrolet	Rick Ware Racing	1	Jeffrey Earnhardt	Bobby Burrell 6 Sterling Laughlin 1	5
Chevrolet	Rick Ware Racing	1	Carl Long	Bobby Burrell 6 Sterling Laughlin 1	1
Chevrolet	Rick Ware Racing	1	Bobby Hamilton Jr.	Bobby Burrell 6 Sterling Laughlin 1	1
Chevrolet	Rick Ware Racing	16	Donnie Neuenberger	Sterling Laughlin	1
Chevrolet	RSS Racing	38	Mike Garvey	Tony Wilson	15
Chevrolet	RSS Racing	38	Dennis Setzer	Tony Wilson	1
Chevrolet	Steve McGowan Motorsports	19	David Mayhew	Terry Henry	3
Chevrolet	Tagsby Racing	65	Stephan McCurley	Kelly Frankum	2
Chevrolet	Tagsby Racing	65	Brent Raymer	Kelly Frankum	3
Chevrolet	Tagsby Racing	65	Tim Andrews	Kelly Frankum	1
Chevrolet	Tagsby Racing	65	Lance Fenton	Kelly Frankum	1
Chevrolet	Tagsby Racing	73	Rick Crawford	Michael Cheek	3
Chevrolet	Tagsby Racing	73	Brian Johnson Jr.	Michael Cheek	3
Chevrolet	Tagsby Racing	73	J. J. Yeley	Michael Cheek	1
Chevrolet	Tagsby Racing	73	Tim Andrews	Michael Cheek	1
Chevrolet	Tagsby Racing	73	Clay Greenfield	Michael Cheek	1
Chevrolet	Tagsby Racing	73	Brent Raymer	Michael Cheek	1
Chevrolet	Team 7 Motorsports	70	Jeff Agnew	Doug Weddle	4
Chevrolet	Turner Motorsports	08	Ryan Newman	Trent Owens	1
Ford	T3R, LLC	09	Bryan Silas	Cal Boprey 4 AJ Genali 1	4
Ford	T3R, LLC	09	Charlie Vest	Cal Boprey 4 AJ Genali 1	1
Ford	T3R, LLC	99	Wayne Edwards	AJ Genali 4 Cal Boprey 7	1
Ford	T3R, LLC	99	Charlie Vest	AJ Genali 4 Cal Boprey 7	2
Ford	Chase Mattioli Racing	99	Chad McCumbee	AJ Genali 4 Cal Boprey 7	1
Ford	Chase Mattioli Racing	99	Chase Mattioli (R)	AJ Genali 4 Cal Boprey 7	2
Ford	Chase Mattioli Racing	99	J. R. Fitzpatrick	AJ Genali 4 Cal Boprey 7	1
Ford	Chase Mattioli Racing	99	Bryan Silas	AJ Genali 4 Cal Boprey 7	2
Ford	Chase Mattioli Racing	99	Charlie Vest	AJ Genali 4 Cal Boprey 7	1
Ford	Chase Mattioli Racing	99	Patrick Sheltra	AJ Genali 4 Cal Boprey 7	1
Ford	Bragg Racing Group	82	Grant Enfinger	Josh Bragg	1
Ford	Brent Raymer Racing	85	Brent Raymer	Josh Raymer	2
Ford	MB Motorsports	63	Nick Hoffman	Mike Mittler	2
Ford	MB Motorsports	63	Jack Smith	Mike Mittler	6
Ford	MB Motorsports	65	Tyler Tanner	Mike Mittler	1
Ford	Ray Hackett Racing	76	Alli Owens	Steve Darne 1 Ray Hackett 1 Bobby Burrell 2	1
Ford	Ray Hackett Racing	76	Ryan Hackett	Steve Darne 1 Ray Hackett 1 Bobby Burrell 2	1
Ford	Ray Hackett Racing	76	Derek White	Steve Darne 1 Ray Hackett 1 Bobby Burrell 2	2
Ford	Sam Pearce Racing	61	Wes Burton	Randy Dean	1
Ram	Alger Motorsports	68	Clay Greenfield	Tim Walter	7
Ram	Alger Motorsports	68	Wayne Edwards	Tim Walter	1
Ram	Allgaier Motorsports	36	Grant Enfinger	John Monsam	1
Ram	Martins Motorsports	42	Tommy Joe Martins	Ron Smith	1
Toyota	Coulter Motorsports	97	Matt Lofton	Blake Bainbridge 1 Jon Wolfe 1	2
Toyota	Germain Racing	30	Todd Bodine	Mike Hillman Jr.	10
Toyota	Germain Racing	77	Justin Lofton	Ryan Fugle	9
Toyota	Glenden Enterprises	84	Chris Fontaine	Kevin Ingram	6
Toyota	Panhandle Motorsports	20	Johanna Long (R)	Kevin Starland 19; Trip Bruce 1	19
Toyota	Panhandle Motorsports	20	Ross Chastain	Kevin Starland 19; Trip Bruce 1	1
Toyota	Randy Moss Motorsports	25	Tayler Malsam	Dan Stillman	3
Toyota	Vision Aviation Racing (Note: Billy Ballew Motorsports merged with West Coast team Vision Aviation Racing to continue running in the Truck Series. The team ran under the VAR banner, with Ballew being majority owner and Toyota continuing its support. The original plan, as stated by manager Tom Davis, was to run his son Dusty in the No. 15 for 7 races and Justin Johnson for 22. However, after Nashville, the No. 15 was shut down and the No. 51 running a limited schedule after Vision Airlines Chief operating officer Steven Acor decided to cut back the racing team.) 4 Billy Ballew Motorsports 1 Kyle Busch Motorsports 3	15	Michael Waltrip	Doug Howe 6 Rick Ren 2	1
Toyota	Vision Aviation Racing 4 Billy Ballew Motorsports 1 Kyle Busch Motorsports 3	15	Dusty Davis (R)	Doug Howe 6 Rick Ren 2	4
Toyota	Vision Aviation Racing 4 Billy Ballew Motorsports 1 Kyle Busch Motorsports 3	15	Kimi Räikkönen	Doug Howe 6 Rick Ren 2	1
Toyota	Vision Aviation Racing 4 Billy Ballew Motorsports 1 Kyle Busch Motorsports 3	15	Josh Richards	Doug Howe 6 Rick Ren 2	2
Ford Chevrolet	Mike Harmon Racing	74	Mike Harmon	Daniel Kolanda	7
Chevrolet Toyota	Eddie Sharp Racing	45	Mike Skinner	Jefferson Hodges 2 Carl Hartmann 1 Greg Kennon Jr. 1	2
Chevrolet Toyota	Eddie Sharp Racing	45	Chad McCumbee	Jefferson Hodges 2 Carl Hartmann 1 Greg Kennon Jr. 1	1
Chevrolet Toyota	Eddie Sharp Racing	45	Tim George Jr.	Jefferson Hodges 2 Carl Hartmann 1 Greg Kennon Jr. 1	1
Ram	Winfield Motorsports	27	Chris Eggleston (R)	Rob Winfield	2
Chevrolet	RSS Racing	27	Clay Greenfield	Kris Nicholson 2 Jerry Henry 1 Timothy Brown 2	1
Chevrolet	RSS Racing	27	David Stremme	Kris Nicholson 2 Jerry Henry 1 Timothy Brown 2	1
Chevrolet	RSS Racing	27	Brent Raymer	Kris Nicholson 2 Jerry Henry 1 Timothy Brown 2	1
Chevrolet	RSS Racing	27	Chris Jones	Kris Nicholson 2 Jerry Henry 1 Timothy Brown 2	1
Chevrolet	RSS Racing	27	Dennis Setzer	Kris Nicholson 2 Jerry Henry 1 Timothy Brown 2	1
Ford Ram	Jennifer Jo Cobb Racing	0	Wayne Edwards	Kevin Eagle	1
Ford Ram	Jennifer Jo Cobb Racing	0	T. J. Bell	Kevin Eagle	1
Ford Ram	Jennifer Jo Cobb Racing	10	Jennifer Jo Cobb	Steve Kuykendall 11; Cal Boprey 3 Mark Janes-O'Rourke 1 Kevin Eagle 4 Nick Ramey 1	16
Ford Ram	Jennifer Jo Cobb Racing	10	Chase Mattioli	Steve Kuykendall 11; Cal Boprey 3 Mark Janes-O'Rourke 1 Kevin Eagle 4 Nick Ramey 1	3
Ford Ram	Jennifer Jo Cobb Racing	10	Chris Lafferty	Steve Kuykendall 11; Cal Boprey 3 Mark Janes-O'Rourke 1 Kevin Eagle 4 Nick Ramey 1	1
Ford Ram	Sacred Power Motorsports	73	A. J. Russell	Kevin Eagle 1 Rusty Davidson 1	2
Ford Toyota	John King Racing	16	John King	Jimmie Barfield	2
Toyota 11 Chevrolet 1 Ford 2	Vision Aviation Racing 6 Billy Ballew Motorsports 2 Kyle Busch Motorsports 6	51	Aric Almirola	Doug George 5 Rick Ren 7 Richie Wauters 2	1
Toyota 11 Chevrolet 1 Ford 2	Vision Aviation Racing 6 Billy Ballew Motorsports 2 Kyle Busch Motorsports 6	51	Justin Johnson (R)	Doug George 5 Rick Ren 7 Richie Wauters 2	4
Toyota 11 Chevrolet 1 Ford 2	Vision Aviation Racing 6 Billy Ballew Motorsports 2 Kyle Busch Motorsports 6	51	Chris Fontaine	Doug George 5 Rick Ren 7 Richie Wauters 2	1
Toyota 11 Chevrolet 1 Ford 2	Vision Aviation Racing 6 Billy Ballew Motorsports 2 Kyle Busch Motorsports 6	51	Colin Braun	Doug George 5 Rick Ren 7 Richie Wauters 2	2
Toyota 11 Chevrolet 1 Ford 2	Vision Aviation Racing 6 Billy Ballew Motorsports 2 Kyle Busch Motorsports 6	51	Josh Richards	Doug George 5 Rick Ren 7 Richie Wauters 2	4
Toyota 11 Chevrolet 1 Ford 2	Vision Aviation Racing 6 Billy Ballew Motorsports 2 Kyle Busch Motorsports 6	51	Germán Quiroga	Doug George 5 Rick Ren 7 Richie Wauters 2	2

Note: A driver designated with a (R) next to their name indicates that they are contenders for the 2011 Rookie of the Year award.

=== Team changes ===
- Germain Racing added the No. 9 team to its full-time lineup with Max Papis.
- Billy Ballew Motorsports and Vision Aviation Racing merged to continue to field No. 15 and No. 51 trucks but after six races, Vision Aviation Racing was shut down.

Began operations

- Texas businessmen Bob Leavine and Lance Fenton have formed Leavine Fenton Racing. Fenton ran a partial schedule in the No. 95 Ford.
- Virginia native Joe Denette started his own race team, Joe Denette Motorsports. Denette is a NASCAR fan who won the Virginia Lottery Mega Million in May 2009 after being laid off four months prior. He has teamed with fellow Virginian Hermie Sadler to start his own team with assistance from Kevin Harvick, Inc. Jason White joined the team for the 2011 season.

Discontinued operations

- Team Gill Racing shut down with their assets having been purchased by Eddie Sharp Racing.

=== Driver changes ===
- Mike Skinner parted ways with Randy Moss Motorsports after the 2010 season due to a lack of chemistry. In an interview with Sirius Speedway, Skinner said that he had talked to a few teams and would prefer to remain with Toyota. On February 11, Skinner announced that he would drive the No. 45 of Eddie Sharp Racing at Daytona and potentially at Phoenix.

Changed teams

- Justin Lofton was released by Red Horse Racing after his rookie season. He drove the No. 77 for Germain Racing.
- Jason White leaves SS-Green Light Racing and joined the new Joe Denette Motorsports team.
- Midway through 2011, Germain Racing was unable to field its flagship No. 30 Toyota driven by Todd Bodine due to a lack of sponsorship. Germain announced on July 13 that they would partner with Randy Moss Motorsports to put Bodine in the No. 5 for the rest of 2011, releasing Travis Kvapil. According to owner Bob Germain, the trucks was prepared by Germain but given the #5.

Entered the series

- Joey Coulter drove full-time this season with Richard Childress Racing, as a teammate to Austin Dillon. He drove the No. 22 Silverado and had veteran Harold Holly as crew chief.
- Fourth-generation driver Jeffrey Earnhardt ran for ROTY with Rick Ware Racing. However, he was released after 3 races when Fuel Doctor decided to leave.
- Johanna Long moved up to full-time status for 2011 with her Panhandle Motorsports team.
- Former Renault F1 driver Nelson Piquet Jr. drove for Kevin Harvick, Inc. full-time this season.
- With Eddie Sharp Racing having purchased Team Gill Racing, 2010 ARCA runner-up Craig Goess drove the No. 46 Toyota full-time in 2011.
- Brazilian driver Miguel Paludo drove Red Horse Racing's No. 7 Toyota full-time.
- Vision Aviation Racing teammates Dusty Davis and Justin Johnson moved up from the NASCAR K&N Pro Series West to drive the No. 15 and No. 51 Toyotas respectively. They were not approved to run at Daytona International Speedway, so Michael Waltrip and Aric Almirola drove the No. 15 and #51.
- Chris Eggleston attempted to run for ROTY with Winfield Motorsports.
- Red Bull development driver Cole Whitt, after spending a season in the K&N Pro Series East, ran for ROTY with Stacy Compton's Turn One Racing.
- Chase Mattioli, son of Pocono Raceway owner Joseph Mattioli, formed his own team, Chase Mattioli Racing and ran the full 2011 season. Mattioli was unable to start at Daytona due to a gastrointestinal infection and had Chad McCumbee drive. The team used Jennifer Jo Cobb Racing's owner points from 2010, as Jennifer Jo Cobb is running the Nationwide Series.
- 2007 Formula One World Champion Kimi Räikkönen announced that he would run a part-time schedule starting in the summer, driving for his own ICE 1 Racing team in a partnership with Foster Gillett. On April 2, it was announced that Räikkönen would instead drive a limited schedule for Kyle Busch Motorsports starting at Charlotte. He entered at Charlotte driving Vision Aviation Racing's No. 15 Toyota, fielded by Busch.

Returned to the series

- Brendan Gaughan returns to the Truck Series full-time for the first time since 2008. He drove for Germain Racing.
- Travis Kvapil returns to the Truck Series full-time for the first time since 2007. He drove the No. 5 for Randy Moss Motorsports, replacing Mike Skinner. Kvapil also ran the Sprint Cup title while driving the No. 38 Ford for Front Row Motorsports.
- Justin Marks returns to NASCAR for the first time since 2008. He drove for Stacy Compton's Turn One Racing.

Exited the series

- Aric Almirola drove for JR Motorsports in the Nationwide Series due to lack of sponsorship being found for Vision Aviation Racing; he returned to the No. 51 truck for the NextEra Energy Resources 250 at Daytona as Vision Aviation Racing's drivers were both ineligible to run Daytona because of NASCAR's requirements for driver experience before running Daytona or Talladega.
- Narain Karthikeyan returned to Formula One this season with Hispania Racing.

=== Mid-season changes ===
- Justin Lofton parted ways with Germain Racing after the WinStar World Casino & Resort 400. He soon signed with Eddie Sharp Racing, which, ironically, was the team that Lofton won the 2009 ARCA Re/Max Series championship with. Craig Goess, the driver Lofton replaced, is currently unable to find a ride.
- Due to season struggles, Randy Moss Motorsports and Germain Racing joined forces to field Todd Bodine in the No. 5 truck for the remainder of the season after the UNOH 225. The team ran out of the Germain shop and crew chiefed by Mike Hillman Jr. The move leaves Travis Kvapil without a ride, and original crew chief Dan Stillman moved to ThorSport Racing.

=== Rookie entries ===
The 2011 Camping World Truck Series rookie class, from the outset, was packed with talent. Ranging from development drivers Cole Whitt, Joey Coulter, and Parker Kligerman to Snowball Derby winner Johanna Long, ex-Formula 1 driver Nelson Piquet Jr., fourth-generation driver Jeffrey Earnhardt, ARCA Racing Series runner-up Craig Goess, and Brazilian touring car driver Miguel Paludo. From the outset, Whitt impressed many by winning the pole at Darlington early on, but struggled midway through the season. Earnhardt's Rick Ware Racing truck team shut down after Martinsville when sponsor Fuel Doctor abruptly left the team for Turn One Racing. Goess was released by Eddie Sharp Racing after only 9 races and was replaced by Justin Lofton. Sponsorship woes sidelined Long's rookie bid, as well as those of Dusty Davis and Justin Johnson. Paludo managed 7 top 10s in his first full season. Kligerman, Coulter, and Piquet improved their finishes mid-season, surging past a struggling Whitt. Eventually, Coulter emerged on top as ROTY.

== 2011 calendar ==
Speed televised the entire season.

No.	Race title	Track	Date	Time	
No.	Race title	Track	Date	Local	UTC
1	NextEra Energy Resources 250	Daytona International Speedway, Daytona Beach	February 18	7:30	12:30
2	Lucas Oil 150	Phoenix International Raceway, Phoenix	February 25	6:00	11:00
3	Too Tough To Tame 200	Darlington Raceway, Darlington	March 12	5:00	10:00
4	Kroger 250	Martinsville Speedway, Ridgeway	April 2	2:00	7:00
5	Bully Hill Vineyards 200	Nashville Superspeedway, Gladeville	April 22	7:00	24:00
6	Lucas Oil 200	Dover International Speedway, Dover	May 13	8:30	13:30
7	N.C. Education Lottery 200	Charlotte Motor Speedway, Concord	May 20	8:00	13:00
8	O'Reilly Auto Parts 250	Kansas Speedway, Kansas City	June 4	1:00	6:00
9	WinStar World Casino 400K	Texas Motor Speedway, Fort Worth	June 10	8:00	13:00
10	UNOH 225	Kentucky Speedway, Sparta	July 7	8:00	13:00
11	Coca-Cola 200 presented by Hy-Vee	Iowa Speedway, Newton	July 16	7:00	12:00
12	Lucas Deep Clean 200	Nashville Superspeedway, Gladeville	July 22	7:00	12:00
13	AAA Insurance 200	Lucas Oil Raceway, Clermont	July 29	7:30	12:30
14	Good Sam RV Emergency Road Service 125	Pocono Raceway, Long Pond	August 7	1:00	6:00
15	VFW 200	Michigan International Speedway, Brooklyn	August 20	12:30	17:30
16	O'Reilly Auto Parts 200	Bristol Motor Speedway, Bristol	August 24	8:00	13:00
17	Good Sam Club 200	Atlanta Motor Speedway, Hampton	September 2	8:00	13:00
18	Fast Five 225	Chicagoland Speedway, Joliet	September 16	8:00	13:00
19	F. W. Webb 175	New Hampshire Motor Speedway, Loudon	September 24	3:00	8:00
20	Kentucky 225	Kentucky Speedway, Sparta	October 1	8:00	13:00
21	Smith's 350	Las Vegas Motor Speedway, Las Vegas, Nevada	October 15	12:30	4:30
22	Coca-Cola 250 powered by Fred's	Talladega Superspeedway, Talladega	October 22	3:00	8:00
23	Kroger 200	Martinsville Speedway, Ridgeway	October 29	2:00	7:00
24	WinStar World Casino 350K	Texas Motor Speedway, Fort Worth	November 4	8:00	13:00
25	Ford 200	Homestead-Miami Speedway, Homestead	November 18	8:00	13:00

=== Calendar changes ===
- The Lucas Oil 150, held at Phoenix International Raceway, was moved from November to February, causing it to become the second race of the season.
- Darlington Raceway's race date moved from August to March.
- Kentucky Speedway received an additional race in July.
- Atlanta Motor Speedway's race date moved from March to September.
- Kansas Speedway's race date moved to June.
- Gateway International Raceway was not included in the calendar.

== Results and standings ==
=== Races ===
No.	Race	Pole position	Most laps led	Winning driver	Winning manufacturer
1	NextEra Energy Resources 250	Austin Dillon	James Buescher	Michael Waltrip	Toyota
2	Lucas Oil 150	Clint Bowyer	Kyle Busch	Kyle Busch	Toyota
3	Too Tough To Tame 200	Cole Whitt	Kasey Kahne	Kasey Kahne	Toyota
4	Kroger 250	Johnny Sauter	Johnny Sauter	Johnny Sauter	Chevrolet
5	Bully Hill Vineyards 200	Kyle Busch	Kyle Busch	Kyle Busch	Toyota
6	Lucas Oil 200	Justin Marks	Kyle Busch	Kyle Busch	Toyota
7	North Carolina Education Lottery 200	Timothy Peters	Clint Bowyer	Kyle Busch	Toyota
8	O'Reilly Auto Parts 250	Austin Dillon	Clint Bowyer	Clint Bowyer	Chevrolet
9	WinStar World Casino 400K	James Buescher	Johnny Sauter	Ron Hornaday Jr.	Chevrolet
10	UNOH 225	Johnny Sauter	Kyle Busch	Kyle Busch	Toyota
11	Coca-Cola 200	David Mayhew	Austin Dillon	Matt Crafton	Chevrolet
12	Lucas Deep Clean 200	Austin Dillon	Timothy Peters	Austin Dillon	Chevrolet
13	AAA Insurance 200	Austin Dillon	James Buescher	Timothy Peters	Toyota
14	Good Sam RV Emergency Road Service 125	Kevin Harvick	Kevin Harvick	Kevin Harvick	Chevrolet
15	VFW 200	Matt Crafton	Mark Martin	Kevin Harvick	Chevrolet
16	O'Reilly Auto Parts 200	Elliott Sadler	Kevin Harvick	Kevin Harvick	Chevrolet
17	Good Sam Club 200	Ricky Carmichael	Clint Bowyer	Ron Hornaday Jr.	Chevrolet
18	Fast Five 225	Steve Arpin	Kevin Harvick	Austin Dillon	Chevrolet
19	F. W. Webb 175	Kyle Busch	Kyle Busch	Kyle Busch	Toyota
20	Kentucky 225	Austin Dillon	Ron Hornaday Jr.	Ron Hornaday Jr.	Chevrolet
21	Smith's 350	Ron Hornaday Jr.	Ron Hornaday Jr.	Ron Hornaday Jr.	Chevrolet
22	Coca-Cola 250	James Buescher	Mike Wallace	Mike Wallace	Chevrolet
23	Kroger 200	Matt Crafton	Denny Hamlin	Denny Hamlin	Toyota
24	WinStar World Casino 350K	James Buescher	Kevin Harvick	Kevin Harvick	Chevrolet
25	Ford 200	James Buescher	Johnny Sauter	Johnny Sauter	Chevrolet

=== Drivers' standings ===
(key) Bold - Pole position awarded by time. Italics - Pole position earned by final practice results or rainout. * – Most laps led.

Pos	Driver	DAY	PHO	DAR	MAR	NSH	DOV	CLT	KAN	TEX	KEN	IOW	NSH	IRP	POC	MCH	BRI	ATL	CHI	NHA	KEN	LVS	TAL	MAR	TEX	HOM	Points
1	Austin Dillon	**20**	5	15	7	11	4	7	**12**	26	14	2*	**1**	**9**	5	22	23	6	1	2	**2**	17	7	3	2	10	888
2	Johnny Sauter	17	4	9	**1***	7	11	6	2	22*	**24**	4	2	23	4^{5}	13	2	29	6	5	14	4	15	4	7	1*	882
3	James Buescher	9*	DNQ	5	35	5	8	4	4	**9**	9	7	7	2*	3	4	4	10	11	7	3	21	**3**	10	**19**	12	859
4	Ron Hornaday Jr.	28	3	2	3	4	9	5^{4}	30	1	27	19	17	5	9	7	24	1	10	4	1*	**1***	2	2	34	13	838
5	Timothy Peters	11	12	6	5	3	17	**32**	14	20	16	11	3*	1	10	2	5	16	17	9	17	3	23	8	11	8	832
6	Todd Bodine	23	14	3	14	19	27	27	3	31	4	10	6	12	12	11	3	9	13	8	7	5	6	11	13	16	803
7	Joey Coulter **(R)**	34	9	28	17	24	6	16	5	5	7	5	10	7	6	18	6	13	12	11	13	22	20	5	6	5	796
8	Matt Crafton	10	7	4	11	6	3	26	18	29	32	1	11	6	8	**21**	21	7	7	6	23	2	31	**12**	5	19	785
9	Cole Whitt **(R)**	14	6	**8**	6	12	2	3	15	28	26	6	19	8	15	10	12	32	9	15	8	8	14	27	17	22	764
10	Nelson Piquet Jr. **(R)**	27	13	32	30	2	16	21	8	13	22	8	4	14	14	16	8	20	3	24	4	6	26	13	4	4	752
11	Parker Kligerman **(R)**	15	32	14	13	10	21	8	11	2	2	22	5	11	13	23	10	12	4	18	29	10	28	21	28	14	728
12	Brendan Gaughan	26	17	25	9	17	7	30	7	14	3	16	13	16	22	8	20	18	14	12	19	9	8	9	31	20	713
13	David Starr	13	34	10	26	8	12	28	16	30	8	9	8	3	18	5	11	17	19	14	10	16	30	22	23	11	703
14	Justin Lofton	18	30	13	32	16	25	13	19	10	15	12	15	20	16	15	7	26	15	13	11	19	11	17	10	18	687
15	Jason White	30	10	33	22	13	14	14	17	16	5	25	12	26	17	6	16	25	24	17	24	14	5	15	12	9	682
16	Ricky Carmichael	8	31	30	8	14	29	12	21	6	13	27	16	19	20	12	29	**8**	25	19	6	12	4	35	8	17	675
17	Miguel Paludo **(R)**	4	25	27	12	27	28	35	13	8	21	15	14	4	19	3	31	22	8	10	25	27	18	16	9	32	651
18	Max Papis	12	15	18	10	23	13	25	22	15	11	20	27	18	11	19	26	14	18	20	28	29	10	18	14	21	643
19	Ryan Sieg	25	21	16	33	21	15	24	31	7	19	18	24	29	21	17	25	15	28	22	33	11	21	23	15	24	563
20	Clay Rogers	3	16	11	16	31	20	17	28	25	17	17		15			14				16			24			391
21	Johanna Long **(R)**	32	20	31	18	32	22	20	24	11	36	Wth	26	17			15	31					16	33	18		347
22	Norm Benning	36	27	26	27	DNQ	26	DNQ	33	35	31	26	25	31	24	20	DNQ	DNQ	27	25	21	15	DNQ	29	DNQ	29	323
23	Justin Marks	24	18	24	21	25	**10**	9	20	17	35	28	21					28									292
24	Blake Feese												18				18	4		21	12	13	19	32	27	23	253
25	Travis Kvapil	29	36	17	20	20	23	11	10	12	10																252
26	Shane Sieg	DNS	22	12	29	26	19	23	29	19	25		28	35	29												233
27	Craig Goess **(R)**	16	23	19	24	9	24	22	23	18																	218
28	Brad Sweet	21	11	36	15	28	30	10	9																		193
29	Dakoda Armstrong											21		21		24			20		9		17			25	172
30	Josh Richards										29		22	22			17	21			34		13	28			166
31	Mike Garvey					36	35	36	35	34	34	30	34	36	28	30	35	35^{1}	31		32^{1}	30		36	36^{1}	DNS	160
32	Steve Arpin									23	12	13		13					**16**								144
33	David Mayhew		29							3		**3**					13^{1}					7					135
34	Ross Chastain													10			19				22				16	27	126
35	Chris Fontaine	19		DNQ			18	18			33				27			27^{1}					25				124
36	Jack Smith										18	29^{1}		28				11	23						26		114
37	B. J. McLeod		35										20					30^{1}			26	23	27		21		112
38	Jeffrey Earnhardt **(R)**	7	19	20	34																		34				106
39	Ty Dillon																				18				3	6	105
40	Cale Gale					29															15	20		7			105
41	Dusty Davis **(R)**		26	21	25	Wth																				15	89
42	Justin Johnson **(R)**		8	35	31	15																					88
43	Brian Ickler									4^{3}		14									5	28					86
44	Jamie Dick	DNQ		23		30		29				23											29				86
45	Wes Burton							33							23					23			24				73
46	Chase Mattioli **(R)**		33	34	28	33				24																	68
47	Caleb Roark				19							24							22								67
48	Jeff Agnew																28			27				14		DNQ	63
49	Butch Miller															27				30		24	33				62
50	Colin Braun															9		19									60
51	Chris Jones						32		34^{1}							33	34		35^{1}	32^{1}	31	33			35^{1}		57
52	Grant Enfinger	DNQ																					12	20			56
53	Brent Raymer	DNQ	DNQ										29				36		32		36^{1}	26				DNS	53
54	Max Gresham																					25		25		31	51
55	Clay Greenfield	DNQ								27^{1}			30					DNQ			30^{1}		DNQ		22	30	50
56	Germán Quiroga																			16						26	46
57	John King					DNQ					28						32				27						46
58	Charlie Vest										20							33	DNQ								35
59	Peyton Sellers														25	28											35
60	Brian Johnson Jr.					DNQ											27		26								35
61	Nick Hoffman					34			25																		29
62	Chad McCumbee	35		DNQ											26												27
63	Todd Peck											31		27^{1}			Wth			31							26
64	Bobby Hamilton Jr.					22																					22
65	Ryan Hackett																						22				22
66	Rick Crawford	DNQ	DNQ																						24		20
67	Mike Skinner	DNQ	24																								20
68	Chris Cockrum																	24									20
69	A. J. Russell																			26							18
70	Greg Pursley		28																								16
71	Tayler Malsam	DNQ	DNQ	29	Wth																						15
72	Ricky Moxley													30													14
73	Tyler Tanner																							30			14
74	Matt Lofton				23^{1}																			31			13
75	Stephan McCurley								DNQ	32																	12
76	Lance Fenton																					32					12
77	Tommy Joe Martins													33													11
78	Brad Queen													34													10
79	Chris Lafferty			DNQ			36	Wth					31^{1}		31^{1}	26^{1}											8
	Wayne Edwards																	DNQ	DNQ			31^{1}					0
	Greg Seevers											32^{1}															0
	Johnny Borneman III																					34^{1}					0
	Chris Eggleston **(R)**	DNQ	DNQ																								0
	Derek White																								DNQ	DNQ	0
	Brennan Newberry																			Wth						DNQ	0
	Alli Owens	DNQ																									0
	Frank Kimmel																									DNQ	0
	Billy Keyes				Wth																						0
Pos	Driver	DAY	PHO	DAR	MAR	NSH	DOV	CLT	KAN	TEX	KEN	IOW	NSH	IRP	POC	MCH	BRI	ATL	CHI	NHA	KEN	LVS	TAL	MAR	TEX	HOM	Points
Ineligible for Camping World Truck driver championship points
	Kyle Busch	5	1*		2	**1***	1*	1	6		1*				2	25	30	3	5	**1***			9		33		
	Kevin Harvick				4		5								**1***	1	1*		2	3				6	1*	3	
	Clint Bowyer		**2**					2*	1*									2*									
	Denny Hamlin																							1*		2	
	Michael Waltrip	1																									
	Kasey Kahne			1*																							
	Mike Wallace																						1*				
	Elliott Sadler	2		7		18					6		9	24			**9**							19		7	
	Ryan Newman																	5									
	Jennifer Jo Cobb	6				DNQ			27		30		23	32			DNQ	23	29	35	20	18	DNQ		20	35	
	Mark Martin														7	14*											
	Kimi Räikkönen							15																			
	Bryan Silas							19	26								22		21					26		28	
	Tim Andrews									21															DNQ		
	T. J. Bell^{2}	31		22				31																	32		
	Aric Almirola	22																									
	Johnny Chapman					35	31			33	23		32					34							29	36	
	Jake Crum^{2}													25			33								25		
	J. J. Yeley							34	32							31			30	28			36				
	Casey Roderick															29											
	Josh Wise																			29							
	Mike Harmon												33			32			36	33	35		DNQ		30	33	
	James Hylton														30												
	Donnie Neuenberger	33																					32				
	Dennis Setzer																	36	33							34	
	Carl Long						33																				
	J. R. Fitzpatrick						34																				
	David Stremme																		34								
	Bobby Santos III																			34							
	T. J. Duke^{2}																							34			
	Patrick Sheltra																						35				
	Scott Riggs								36																		
	Tim George Jr.																									DNQ	
Pos	Driver	DAY	PHO	DAR	MAR	NSH	DOV	CLT	KAN	TEX	KEN	IOW	NSH	IRP	POC	MCH	BRI	ATL	CHI	NHA	KEN	LVS	TAL	MAR	TEX	HOM	Points

- ^{1} – Post entry, driver and owner did not score points.
- ^{2} – Driver originally registered for Truck points; Bell switched to Sprint Cup after Charlotte, Crum switched to Nationwide after Kentucky, Duke switched to Nationwide after Martinsville.
- ^{3} – Ickler was not registered for Truck points at Texas.
- ^{4} - Hornaday Jr. received a 25-point penalty for an infraction of his truck's rear gear.
- ^{5} - Sauter suffered a 6-point penalty after failing post-race inspection.

=== Manufacturer ===
Pos	Manufacturer	Wins	Points
1	Chevrolet	15	**193**
2	Toyota	10	**176**
3	Dodge	0	**101**
4	Ford	0	**77**

== See also ==
- 2011 NASCAR Sprint Cup Series
- 2011 NASCAR Nationwide Series
- 2011 ARCA Racing Series
- 2011 NASCAR Whelen Modified Tour
- 2011 NASCAR Whelen Southern Modified Tour
- 2011 NASCAR Canadian Tire Series
- 2011 NASCAR Corona Series
- 2011 NASCAR Stock V6 Series
