= Brent Raymer =

American stock car racing driver

- Born: December 23, 1985 (age 40); Concord, North Carolina, U.S.

NASCAR FedEx Freight Truck Series career
- 49 races run over 5 years
- 2012 position: 71st
- Best finish: 19th (2010)
- First race: 2008 Kroger 250 (Martinsville)
- Last race: 2012 WinStar World Casino 400 (Texas)
Wins	Top tens	Poles
0	0	0
- Statistics up to date as of November 17, 2012.

Brent Raymer (born December 23, 1985) is an American former stock car racing driver.

== Camping World Truck Series ==
Raymer made his debut in 2008, running five races with a best finish of 27th at Atlanta Motor Speedway. In 2009, he ran 15 Truck races for his own team, finishing a career high 22nd at Lowe's Motor Speedway.

For 2010, Raymer picked up sponsorship from Ford to run the full season. After failing to qualify for the season opener at Daytona, the beginning of Raymer's season was filled with adversity. After losing the last of their race-ready trucks in fiery wrecks during the Charlotte Motor Speedway race weekend, the team was forced to start and park for the next two months. Raymer returned to full competition for the inaugural race at Pocono Raceway, earning a career-best finish of 16th. He earned three more top-20 finishes over the rest of the season, finishing 19th in the final points standings.

In 2011, Raymer ran only five races and finish 53rd in points in Camping World Truck Series. He ran in only one race in 2012 and came 71st in points. Since then, he founded the CrossFit Afton fitness center in Concord, North Carolina.

== Motorsports career results ==
=== NASCAR ===
(key) (Bold – Pole position awarded by qualifying time. Italics – Pole position earned by points standings or practice time. * – Most laps led.)

==== Camping World Truck Series ====
NASCAR Camping World Truck Series results
Year	Team	No.	Make	1	2	3	4	5	6	7	8	9	10	11	12	13	14	15	16	17	18	19	20	21	22	23	24	25	NCWTC	Pts	Ref
2008	Brent Raymer Racing	85	Ford	DAY	CAL	ATL	MAR; 31	KAN	CLT	MFD	DOV	TEX	MCH	MLW; 28	MEM	KEN; 34	IRP	NSH	BRI	GTW	NHA	LVS	TAL	MAR	ATL; 27	TEX	PHO	HOM; 30	49th	365	
2009	Brent Raymer Racing	85	Ford	DAY; 23	CAL	ATL; 29	MAR; 33	KAN; 35	CLT; 22	DOV; 35	TEX	MCH; 30	MLW	MEM; 36	KEN; 36	IRP	NSH	BRI; 25	CHI; 29	IOW	GTW; 28	NHA	LVS	MAR; 29	TAL	TEX; 26	PHO	HOM; 25	31st	1051	
2010	Brent Raymer Racing	85	Ford	DAY; DNQ	ATL; 33	MAR; 22	NSH; 34	KAN; 21	DOV; 31	CLT; 33	TEX; 28	MCH; 29	IOW; 29	GTY; DNQ	IRP; 33	POC; 16	NSH; 20	DAR; 28	BRI; 21	CHI; 35	KEN; 17	NHA; 19	LVS; 29	MAR; 23	TAL; 31	TEX; 31	PHO; 21	HOM; 30	19th	1907	
2011	Brent Raymer Racing	85	Ford	DAY; DNQ	PHO; DNQ	DAR	MAR	NSH	DOV	CLT	KAN	TEX	KEN	IOW															53rd	53	
2011	Tagsby Racing	65	Chevy												NSH; 29	IRP	POC	MCH	BRI; 36	ATL	CHI; 32	NHA							53rd	53	
2011	RSS Racing	27	Chevy																				KEN; 36						53rd	53	
2011	Tagsby Racing	73	Chevy																					LVS; 26	TAL	MAR	TEX	HOM	53rd	53	
2012	RSS Racing	93	Chevy	DAY	MAR	CAR	KAN	CLT	DOV	TEX; 26	KEN	IOW	CHI	POC	MCH	BRI	ATL	IOW	KEN	LVS	TAL	MAR	TEX	PHO	HOM				71st	18	
