= Shane Sieg =

American racing driver (1982–2017)

- Born: Rodney Shane Sieg; August 23, 1982; Tucker, Georgia, U.S.
- Died: August 19, 2017 (aged 34); Tucker, Georgia, U.S.

NASCAR O'Reilly Auto Parts Series career
- 2 races run over 1 year
- Best finish: 121st (2004)
- First race: 2004 Sam's Town 300 (Las Vegas)
- Last race: 2004 Diamond Hill Plywood 200 (Darlington)
Wins	Top tens	Poles
0	0	0

NASCAR FedEx Freight Truck Series career
- 68 races run over 7 years
- 2011 position: 26th
- Best finish: 24th (2004)
- First race: 2003 New Hampshire 200 (New Hampshire)
- Last race: 2011 Good Sam RV Emergency Road Service 125 (Pocono)
Wins	Top tens	Poles
0	3	0
- Statistics up to date as of August 22, 2017.

Rodney Shane Sieg (August 23, 1982 – August 19, 2017) was an American professional stock car racing driver. He last drove the No. 93 S&W Services Chevrolet for RSS Racing. He was the older brother of O'Reilly Auto Parts Series drivers Ryan Sieg and Kyle Sieg.

== Racing career ==
=== Camping World Truck Series ===
In 2003, Sieg made his NASCAR debut at New Hampshire International Speedway, driving the No. 08 Chevrolet for SS-Green Light Racing and finishing sixteenth. For 2004, he was tabbed by SS-Green Light to drive their No. 07 Auto Air Colors Chevy for the entire season. Sieg earned the best result of his career at The Milwaukee Mile when he finished eighth after starting 33rd. This was his only top-ten of the season, however, and he was taken out of the truck after nineteen races. He did not attempt any NASCAR races in 2005 or 2006.

In 2007, Sieg made his return to the Truck Series at Bristol Motor Speedway in a one race deal that reunited him with SS-Green Light. He would also run three races for Billy Ballew Motorsports with a best finish of tenth at New Hampshire, the track at which he debuted. Sieg started 2008 by running two of the first three races of the season for SS-Green Light, blowing engines in both starts. He was then tabbed by Ballew to race the No. 51 Miccosukee Resorts Toyota on weekends when the Sprint Cup Series and regular driver, Kyle Busch, were running at other tracks. In seven races, he earned one top-ten, a ninth-place finish at Memphis Motorsports Park. At the beginning of 2009, Sieg intended to run the entire season in Ballew's No. 15 entry. However, due to a lack of solid sponsorship, he left the team after only five races. He returned later in the year in a second entry for his family's team. He start and parked in seven races to help his brother Ryan run entire races.

In 2010, Sieg and his brother planned to run the full Camping World Truck Series schedule in the No. 93 and No. 39 trucks, respectively. However, Sieg once again ran as a start and park entry in order to help fund his brother's car which planned to run full races, but had no sponsor. Six races into 2010, he was replaced in the No. 93 by long-time ASA driver Mike Garvey. Sieg returned to the team at Texas in November, parking in the final three races of the season. The next year, Sieg gave up his ride at Daytona to rookie Cole Whitt after the No. 60 failed to qualify. Sieg ran a few full races with a best finish of twelfth, though he was pulled again at Michigan and replaced by Casey Roderick. NASCAR announced on August 22 that Sieg had been suspended indefinitely from NASCAR for violating their substance abuse policy.

=== Busch Series ===
Early in 2004, Sieg attempted three races in the No. 51 Dodge for Rick Ware Racing. After failing to qualify at Rockingham, he qualified for the next two races at Las Vegas and Darlington. He crashed early in both races, finishing 42nd and 37th, respectively.

== Death ==
Sieg died on August 19, 2017, at the age of 34.

== Motorsports career results ==
=== NASCAR ===
(key) (Bold – Pole position awarded by qualifying time. Italics – Pole position earned by points standings or practice time. * – Most laps led.)

==== Busch Series ====
NASCAR Busch Series results
Year	Team	No.	Make	1	2	3	4	5	6	7	8	9	10	11	12	13	14	15	16	17	18	19	20	21	22	23	24	25	26	27	28	29	30	31	32	33	34	NBSC	Pts	Ref
2004	Ware Racing Enterprises	51	Dodge	DAY	CAR; DNQ	LVS; 42	DAR; 37	BRI	TEX	NSH	TAL	CAL	GTY	RCH	NZH	CLT	DOV	NSH	KEN	MLW	DAY	CHI	NHA	PPR	IRP	MCH	BRI	CAL	RCH	DOV	KAN	CLT	MEM	ATL	PHO	DAR	HOM	121st	89	

==== Camping World Truck Series ====
NASCAR Camping World Truck Series results
Year	Team	No.	Make	1	2	3	4	5	6	7	8	9	10	11	12	13	14	15	16	17	18	19	20	21	22	23	24	25	NCWTC	Pts	Ref
2003	Green Light Racing	08	Chevy	DAY	DAR	MMR	MAR	CLT	DOV	TEX	MEM	MLW	KAN	KEN	GTW	MCH	IRP	NSH	BRI	RCH	NHA; 16	CAL	LVS; 15	SBO					52nd	451	
2003	Green Light Racing	07	Chevy																						TEX; 19	MAR	PHO	HOM; 17	52nd	451	
2004	Green Light Racing	07	Chevy	DAY; 23	ATL; 13	MAR; 20	MFD; 12	CLT; 32	DOV; 15	TEX; 14	MEM; 22	MLW; 8	KAN; 16	KEN; 13	GTW; 11	MCH; 26	IRP; 21	NSH; 26	BRI; 26	RCH; 18	NHA; 23	LVS; 26	CAL	TEX	MAR	PHO	DAR	HOM	24th	2020	
2007	FDNY Racing	28	Chevy	DAY	CAL	ATL	MAR; DNQ	KAN	CLT	MFD	DOV	TEX	MCH	MLW	MEM	KEN	IRP	NSH											48th	437	
2007	Green Light Racing	08	Chevy																BRI; 25	GTW									48th	437	
2007	Billy Ballew Motorsports	15	Chevy																		NHA; 10	LVS	TAL; 20	MAR	ATL; 17	TEX	PHO	HOM	48th	437	
2008	SS-Green Light Racing	07	Chevy	DAY; 23	CAL; 31	ATL; 18	MAR; 21																						29th	950	
2008	Billy Ballew Motorsports	51	Toyota					KAN; 18	CLT	MFD; 21					MEM; 9	KEN	IRP	NSH; 25	BRI	GTW; 13	NHA	LVS; 19	TAL	MAR	ATL	TEX	PHO	HOM	29th	950	
2008	Billy Ballew Motorsports	15	Toyota								DOV; 14	TEX	MCH	MLW															29th	950	
2009	Billy Ballew Motorsports	15	Chevy	DAY; 15	CAL; 16	ATL; 23	MAR; 32	KAN; 19	CLT	DOV	TEX	MCH	MLW	MEM															35th	936	
2009	RSS Racing	93	Chevy												KEN; 34	IRP	NSH; 34	BRI	CHI; 31	IOW; 35	GTW	NHA	LVS; 34	MAR	TAL	TEX; 33	PHO	HOM; 34	35th	936	
2010	RSS Racing	93	Chevy	DAY; DNQ	ATL; 28	MAR; 36	NSH; 35	KAN; 34	DOV; 33	CLT	TEX	MCH	IOW	GTY	IRP	POC	NSH	DAR	BRI	CHI	KEN	NHA	LVS	MAR	TAL	TEX; 30	PHO; 33	HOM; 36	49th	509	
2011	RSS Racing	93	Chevy	DAY; QL^{†}	PHO; 22	DAR; 12	MAR; 29	NSH; 26	DOV; 19	CLT; 23	KAN; 29	TEX; 19	KEN; 25	IOW	NSH; 28	IRP; 35	POC; 29	MCH	BRI	ATL	CHI	NHA	KEN	LVS	TAL	MAR	TEX	HOM	26th	233	
^{†} – Qualified but replaced by Cole Whitt
