= Craig Goess =

American racing driver

- Born: Craig Goess Jr. April 14, 1981 (age 45) Woodbury, New Jersey, U.S.

ARCA Racing Series career
- Debut season: 2009
- Former teams: Eddie Sharp Racing
- Starts: 41
- Wins: 1
- Poles: 3
- Best finish: 2nd in 2010
- Finished last season: 2nd (2010)

Previous series
- 2008: NASCAR Camping World East Series

NASCAR FedEx Freight Truck Series career
- 11 races run over 2 years
- 2011 position: 27th
- Best finish: 27th (2011)
- First race: 2010 Mountain Dew 250 (Talladega)
- Last race: 2011 WinStar World Casino 400K (Texas)
| Wins | Top tens | Poles |
|---|---|---|
| 0 | 2 | 0 |
- Statistics up to date as of March 23, 2020.

Craig Goess Jr. (born April 14, 1981) is an American former professional stock car racing driver. He competed for Eddie Sharp Racing for the entirety of his NASCAR and ARCA career. Most recently, he drove in the NASCAR Camping World Truck Series in 2011 in their No. 46 Toyota Tundra. Prior to that, he ran full-time in Sharp's No. 81 Toyota for two years in the ARCA Racing Series to much success. He drove ESR's No. 2 car in the NASCAR Camping World East Series (now the ARCA Menards Series East) in 2008.

== Motorsports career results ==
=== NASCAR ===
(key) (Bold – Pole position awarded by qualifying time. Italics – Pole position earned by points standings or practice time. * – Most laps led.)

==== Camping World Truck Series ====
NASCAR Camping World Truck Series results
| Year | Team | No. | Make | 1 | 2 | 3 | 4 | 5 | 6 | 7 | 8 | 9 | 10 | 11 | 12 | 13 | 14 | 15 | 16 | 17 | 18 | 19 | 20 | 21 | 22 | 23 | 24 | 25 | NCWTC | Pts | Ref |
|---|---|---|---|---|---|---|---|---|---|---|---|---|---|---|---|---|---|---|---|---|---|---|---|---|---|---|---|---|---|---|---|
| 2010 | Eddie Sharp Racing | 46 | Toyota | DAY | ATL | MAR | NSH | KAN | DOV | CLT | TEX | MCH | IOW | GTW | IRP | POC | NSH | DAR | BRI | CHI | KEN | NHA | LVS | MAR | TAL; 10 | TEX | PHO | HOM; 12 | 69th | 261 | |
| 2011 | Eddie Sharp Racing | 46 | Toyota | DAY; 16 | PHO; 23 | DAR; 19 | MAR; 24 | NSH; 9 | DOV; 24 | CLT; 22 | KAN; 23 | TEX; 18 | KEN | IOW | NSH | IRP | POC | MCH | BRI | ATL | CHI | NHA | KEN | LVS | TAL | MAR | TEX | HOM | 27th | 218 | |

==== Camping World East Series ====
Camping World East Series results
| Year | Team | No. | Make | 1 | 2 | 3 | 4 | 5 | 6 | 7 | 8 | 9 | 10 | 11 | 12 | 13 | NCWES | Pts | Ref |
|---|---|---|---|---|---|---|---|---|---|---|---|---|---|---|---|---|---|---|---|
| 2008 | Eddie Sharp Racing | 2 | Toyota | GRE; 27 | | SBO; 13 | GLN; 14 | NHA; 22 | TMP; 24 | NSH; 9 | ADI; 13 | LRP | MFD; 5 | NHA; 13 | DOV; 11 | STA; 15 | 16th | 1413 | |
| 2008 | Eddie Sharp Racing | 02 | Toyota | | IOW; 18 | | | | | | | | | | | | 16th | 1413 | |

=== ARCA Racing Series ===
(key) (Bold – Pole position awarded by qualifying time. Italics – Pole position earned by points standings or practice time. * – Most laps led.)

ARCA Racing Series results
| Year | Team | No. | Make | 1 | 2 | 3 | 4 | 5 | 6 | 7 | 8 | 9 | 10 | 11 | 12 | 13 | 14 | 15 | 16 | 17 | 18 | 19 | 20 | 21 | ARSC | Pts | Ref |
|---|---|---|---|---|---|---|---|---|---|---|---|---|---|---|---|---|---|---|---|---|---|---|---|---|---|---|---|
| 2009 | Eddie Sharp Racing | 81 | Toyota | DAY; 17 | SLM; 15 | CAR; 6 | TAL; 30 | KEN; 7 | TOL; 14 | POC; 9 | MCH; 10 | MFD; 10 | IOW; 12 | KEN; 4 | BLN; 7 | POC; 3 | ISF; 26 | CHI; 8 | TOL; 6 | DSF; 34 | NJM; 10 | SLM; 23 | KAN; 10 | CAR; 17 | 5th | 4705 | |
| 2010 | Eddie Sharp Racing | 81 | Toyota | DAY; 34 | PBE; 13 | SLM; 2 | TEX; 2 | TAL; 4 | TOL; 14 | POC; 1 | **MCH**; 6* | IOW; 8 | MFD; 2 | POC; 3 | BLN; 9 | NJM; 8 | ISF; 11 | **CHI**; 5 | DSF; 7 | TOL; 2 | **SLM**; 13 | KAN; 3 | CAR; 5 | | 2nd | 4945 | |
