= Chase Mattioli =

American racing driver

- Born: October 6, 1989 (age 37); Long Pond, Pennsylvania, U.S.

NASCAR O'Reilly Auto Parts Series career
- 2 races run over 2 years
- 2010 position: 133rd
- Best finish: 133rd (2010)
- First race: 2009 Camping World RV Sales 200 (New Hampshire)
- Last race: 2010 Ford 300 (Homestead)
Wins	Top tens	Poles
0	0	0

NASCAR FedEx Freight Truck Series career
- 6 races run over 2 years
- 2011 position: 46th
- Best finish: 46th (2011)
- First race: 2010 Pocono Mountains 125 (Pocono)
- Last race: 2011 WinStar World Casino 400K (Texas)
Wins	Top tens	Poles
0	0	0
- Statistics up to date as of July 22, 2020.

Chase Mattioli (born October 6, 1989) is an American professional stock car racing driver. A member of the Mattioli family, who own Pocono Raceway, he raced in the NASCAR Nationwide Series (now Xfinity), the NASCAR Camping World Truck Series, the ARCA Racing Series, and the East Series.

== Racing career ==
Mattioli's family has been involved in racing for 50 years, but Chase is the first to drive a racecar.

== Motorsports career results ==
=== NASCAR ===
(key) (Bold – Pole position awarded by qualifying time. Italics – Pole position earned by points standings or practice time. * – Most laps led.)

==== Nationwide Series ====
NASCAR Nationwide Series results
Year	Team	No.	Make	1	2	3	4	5	6	7	8	9	10	11	12	13	14	15	16	17	18	19	20	21	22	23	24	25	26	27	28	29	30	31	32	33	34	35	NNSC	Pts	Ref
2009	SK Motorsports	07	Chevy	DAY	CAL	LVS	BRI	TEX	NSH	PHO	TAL	RCH	DAR	CLT	DOV	NSH	KEN	MLW	NHA; 32	DAY	CHI	GTY	IRP	IOW	GLN	MCH	BRI	CGV	ATL	RCH	DOV	KAN	CAL	CLT	MEM	TEX	PHO	HOM	140th	67	
2010	Baker Curb Racing	27	Ford	DAY	CAL	LVS	BRI	NSH	PHO	TEX	TAL	RCH	DAR	DOV	CLT	NSH	KEN	ROA	NHA	DAY	CHI	GTY	IRP	IOW	GLN	MCH	BRI	CGV	ATL	RCH	DOV	KAN	CAL	CLT	GTY	TEX	PHO	HOM; 33	133rd	64	

==== Camping World Truck Series ====
NASCAR Camping World Truck Series results
Year	Team	No.	Make	1	2	3	4	5	6	7	8	9	10	11	12	13	14	15	16	17	18	19	20	21	22	23	24	25	NCWTC	Pts	Ref
2010	Turn One Racing	64	Chevy	DAY	ATL	MAR	NSH	KAN	DOV	CLT	TEX	MCH	IOW	GTW	IRP	POC; 30	NSH	DAR	BRI	CHI	KEN	NHA	LVS	MAR	TAL	TEX	PHO	HOM	123rd		
2011	Chase Mattioli Racing	10	Ford	DAY	PHO; 33	DAR; 34	MAR; 28																						46th	68	
2011	Chase Mattioli Racing	99	Ford					NSH; 33	DOV	CLT	KAN	TEX; 24	KEN	IOW	NSH	IRP	POC	MCH	BRI	ATL	CHI	NHA	KEN	LVS	TAL	MAR	TEX	HOM	46th	68	

==== Camping World East Series ====
NASCAR Camping World East Series results
Year	Team	No.	Make	1	2	3	4	5	6	7	8	9	10	11	12	13	NCWEC	Pts	Ref
2008	Fast Track Racing Enterprises	27	Ford	GRE	IOW	SBO; 17	GLN	NHA; 25	TMP	MCM; 14	ADI						32nd	397	
2008	Fast Track Racing Enterprises	27	Chevy									LRP; 29	MFD	NHA	DOV	STA	32nd	397	
2009	Bobby Hamilton Jr. Racing	46	Ford	GRE	TRI	IOW	SBO; 22	GLN									46th	182	
2009	Fred Wanke	46	Dodge						NHA; 26	TMP	ADI	LRP	NHA	DOV			46th	182	

=== ARCA Racing Series ===
(key) (Bold – Pole position awarded by qualifying time. Italics – Pole position earned by points standings or practice time. * – Most laps led.)

ARCA Racing Series results
Year	Team	No.	Make	1	2	3	4	5	6	7	8	9	10	11	12	13	14	15	16	17	18	19	20	21	22	23	ARSC	Pts	Ref
2008	Fast Track Racing Enterprises	14	Dodge	DAY	SLM; 12	IOW	KAN	CAR	KEN	TOL; 20																	50th	610	
2008	Fast Track Racing Enterprises	10	Chevy								POC; 32	MCH	CAY	KEN	BLN							NJE; 29	TAL	TOL			50th	610	
2008	Fast Track Racing Enterprises	10	Ford													POC; 16	NSH	ISF	DSF	CHI	SLM						50th	610	
2009	Bobby Hamilton Jr. Racing	94	Chevy	DAY; 35	SLM	CAR																					47th	615	
2009	Bobby Hamilton Jr. Racing	04	Toyota				TAL; 32	KEN	TOL																		47th	615	
2009	Bobby Hamilton Jr. Racing	04	Dodge							POC; 36	MCH; DNQ	MFD	IOW; 32	KEN	BLN	POC; 32	ISF	CHI	TOL	DSF							47th	615	
2009	Bobby Hamilton Jr. Racing	04	Chevy																		NJE; 13	SLM	KAN; 19	CAR			47th	615	
2010	Andy Belmont Racing	14	Ford	DAY; 28	PBE; 19	SLM; 18	TEX; 21	TAL; 13	TOL; 12																		21st	1445	
2010	Roulo Brothers Racing	17	Ford							POC; 29	MCH; 23	IOW	MFD	POC; 12	BLN	NJE	ISF	CHI	DSF	TOL	SLM	KAN	CAR				21st	1445	
2011	Fast Track Racing Enterprises	11	Ford	DAY	TAL	SLM	TOL	NJE	CHI	POC; 18	MCH	WIN	BLN	IOW	IRP	POC	ISF	MAD	DSF	SLM	KAN	TOL					118th	140	
