= 2011 NextEra Energy Resources 250 =

Race details
- Race 1 of 25 in the 2011 NASCAR Camping World Truck Series season
- Map of the speedway
- Date: February 18, 2011
- Location: Daytona International Speedway, Daytona Beach, Florida
- Course: Permanent racing facility
- Course length: 2.5 miles (4.023 km)
- Distance: 103 laps, 257.5 mi (414.406 km)
- Scheduled distance: 100 laps, 250 mi (402.336 km)
- Weather: Temperatures reaching up to 81 °F (27 °C); wind speeds up to 7 miles per hour (11 km/h)
- Average speed: 130.025 miles per hour (209.255 km/h)

Pole position
Driver	Austin Dillon	Richard Childress Racing

Most laps led
Driver	James Buescher	Turner Motorsports
- Laps: 55

Winner
No. 15	Michael Waltrip	Vision Aviation Racing

Television in the United States
- Network: Speed
- Announcers: Rick Allen, Phil Parsons, Darrell Waltrip

The 2011 NextEra Energy Resources 250 was a NASCAR Camping World Truck Series race held at Daytona International Speedway in Daytona Beach, Florida on February 18, 2011. The race was the first of the 2011 NASCAR Camping World Truck Series. Austin Dillon of Richard Childress Racing won the pole position, while Michael Waltrip of Vision Aviation Racing won.

== Qualifying ==
46 trucks entered the race. Todd Bodine led the first practice session with a top speed of 193.175 miles per hour (310.885 km/h), while Cole Whitt led the second and final with a speed of 191.026 mph (307.427 km/h). Qualifying was held on February 17. Austin Dillon clinched the pole position with a lap speed of 179.047 mph (288.148 km/h), his eighth-career Truck Series pole. Following Dillon was James Buescher, Ron Hornaday Jr., Ricky Carmichael and rookie Johanna Long, while the top ten closed with Elliott Sadler, Matt Crafton, Joey Coulter, Johnny Sauter and Brad Sweet. Nelson Piquet Jr. initially qualified fourth, but, along with Aric Almirola, were disqualified after post-qualifying inspection when it was revealed that their trucks were too low, and were forced to start from the rear. Rick Crawford, Cole Whitt, Tayler Malsam, Chris Eggleston, Alli Owens, Mike Skinner, Jamie Dick, Brent Raymer, Grant Enfinger and Clay Greenfield failed to qualify. Although Skinner was eligible for the past champion's provisional, due to being the 1995 series champion, his team, Eddie Sharp Racing, failed to enter the race in time.

== Race ==
James Buescher led the first 55 laps, and on lap 37, rookie Joey Coulter cut down a tire and crashed into the turn 2 wall, bringing out the first caution of the race. On the second caution for Donnie Neuenberger's bed cover falling off the truck in turn 4, Timothy Peters took the lead after taking only fuel on lap 56, followed by Ricky Carmichael and Buescher. On lap 66, Justin Marks' hood loosened and covered the windshield, causing him to crash into turn 1. The green flag flew from lap 70 to 75, when Travis Kvapil's tire blew and hit five trucks, while Neuenberger, who was running in the back, failed to slow down in time and collided with other trucks; altogether, 14 trucks (Kvapil, Neuenberger, Max Papis, Matt Crafton, Todd Bodine, Johnny Sauter, Ron Hornaday Jr., Johanna Long, Justin Lofton, Brendan Gaughan, T. J. Bell, Jason White, Craig Goess and Jennifer Jo Cobb) were involved. On lap 85, the caution was flown after Lofton crashed into David Starr. The green flag flew from lap 89 to 97, when Aric Almirola collided with Brad Sweet, creating a nine-truck crash also involving Austin Dillon, Papis, Kyle Busch, Parker Kligerman, Bodine, Chris Fontaine and Buescher. As a result, officials stopped the race for ten minutes to clean up, and the 100-lap race was extended to initiate a green-white-checker finish.

Sometime during the lap under caution before the final restart, the right half of Waltrip's rear spoiler collapsed and fell flat, greatly reducing the aerodynamic drag on his truck that the spoiler is designed to do at Daytona, to limit top speed and encourage drafting. This suddenly gave his truck a prohibitive advantage. On the final lap, Waltrip pushed Elliott Sadler far ahead of the pack, and with his illegally advantaged truck, easily passed him on his outside in the final yards to claim his first Truck Series win, becoming the 22nd driver to win in all three of NASCAR's top series (Sprint Cup Series, Nationwide Series and Trucks). The win was on the ten-year anniversary of Waltrip's first career NASCAR Cup Series win in the 2001 Daytona 500, which was also the site of Waltrip's team owner Dale Earnhardt's death. Clay Rogers, Miguel Paludo and Kyle Busch rounded out the top five, followed by Cobb (the highest finish by a woman in the Truck Series, and the first top 10 by a female in NASCAR's top three series), Jeffrey Earnhardt, Carmichael, Buescher and Crafton.

== Post-race ==
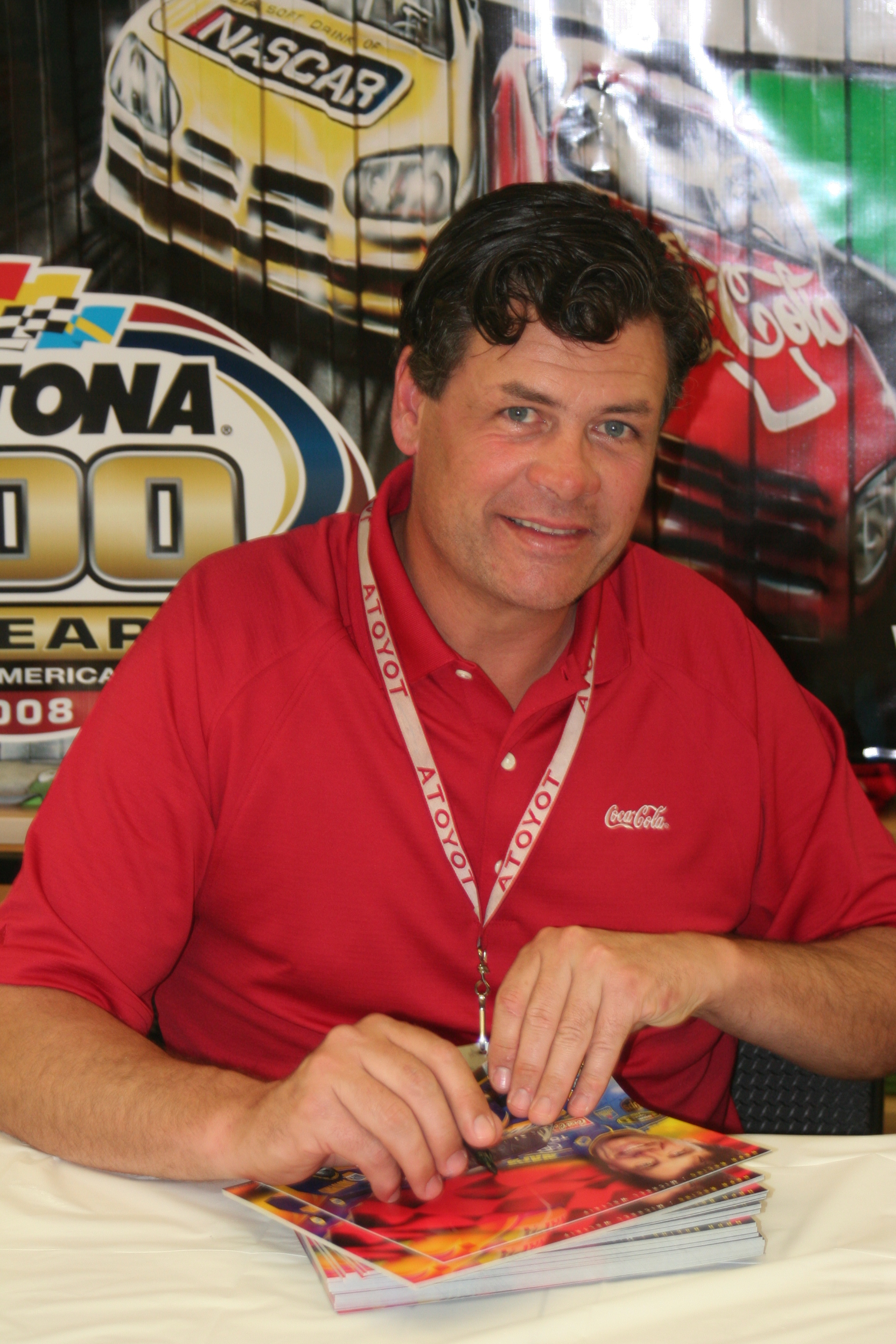
Michael Waltrip (seen in 2008), the 2011 NextEra Energy Resources 250 winner

In victory lane, Waltrip stated:

"This day, it was hard. I've been emotional all day long. It's been really emotional. I just was determined to win the race for him. So I'm drained. I'm thankful. I didn't come here to celebrate winning the 2001 Daytona 500. I came here to celebrate Dale's life and honor him."

Afterwards, NASCAR confiscated Waltrip's rear spoiler, half of it having fallen; NASCAR reported it to be a failure, but continued to examine it. NASCAR spokesman Kerry Tharp stated, "It appeared to be a failed part. The spoiler broke on the green-white-checkered finish. Our typical procedure is, instead of having an immediate reaction, we'll take a look and, if necessary, we'll have whatever reaction is appropriate the first of the week." Eventually, the team was revealed to have "violated Sections 12–1 (actions detrimental to stock car racing), 12-4-J (any determination by NASCAR officials that the race equipment used in the event does not conform to NASCAR rules), and 20B-3.1.2E (rear spoiler did not meet specifications in post-race inspection)". Vision Aviation Racing owner Billy Ballew was penalized 25 owner points, while crew chief Doug Howe was fined $25,000, and was placed on probation for the remainder of the year. As Waltrip was not competing for Truck Series points, he was not penalized any drivers points.

== Results ==
=== Qualifying ===
Pos	No.	Driver	Team	Manufacturer	Time	Speed
1	3	Austin Dillon	Richard Childress Racing	Chevrolet	50.266	179.047
2	31	James Buescher	Turner Scott Motorsports	Chevrolet	50.422	178.423
3	33	Ron Hornaday Jr.	Kevin Harvick Incorporated	Chevrolet	50.517	178.158
4	4	Ricky Carmichael	Turner Scott Motorsports	Chevrolet	50.614	177.816
5	20	Johanna Long (R)	Panhandle Motorsports	Toyota	50.780	177.235
6	2	Elliott Sadler	Kevin Harvick Incorporated	Chevrolet	50.889	176.856
7	88	Matt Crafton	ThorSport Racing	Chevrolet	50.988	176.512
8	22	Joey Coulter (R)	Richard Childress Racing	Chevrolet	51.057	176.274
9	13	Johnny Sauter	Curb Racing	Chevrolet	51.071	176.225
10	32	Brad Sweet	Turner Scott Motorsports	Chevrolet	51.122	176.049
11	15	Michael Waltrip	Vision Aviation Racing	Toyota	51.178	175.857
12	23	Jason White	Joe Denette Motorsports	Chevrolet	51.191	175.812
13	29	Parker Kligerman (R)	Brad Keselowski Racing	Dodge	51.285	175.428
14	7	Miguel Paludo (R)	Red Horse Racing	Chevrolet	51.303	175.428
15	30	Todd Bodine	Germain Racing	Toyota	51.427	175.261
16	84	Chris Fontaine	Glenden Enterprises Team	Toyota	51.400	175.097
17	77	Justin Lofton	Germain Racing	Toyota	51.407	175.073
18	17	Timothy Peters	Red Horse Racing	Toyota	51.427	175.005
19	92	Clay Rogers	RBR Enterprises	Chevrolet	51.495	174.774
20	99	Chad McCumbee	Chase Mattioli Racing	Ford	51.500	174.757
21	18	Kyle Busch	Kyle Busch Motorsports	Toyota	51.508	174.730
22	50	T. J. Bell	MAKE Motorsports	Chevrolet	51.549	174.591
23	1	Jeffrey Earnhardt	Rick Ware Racing	Chevrolet	51.685	174.132
24	5	Travis Kvapil	Randy Moss Motorsports	Toyota	51.701	174.078
25	81	David Starr	SS-Green Light Racing	Toyota	51.756	173.893
26	62	Brendan Gaughan	Richard Childress Racing	Chevrolet	51.916	173.357
27	07	Donnie Neuenberger	SS-Green Light Racing	Chevrolet	51.929	163.314
28	46	Craig Goess (R)	Eddie Sharp Racing	Toyota	51.941	173.274
29	39	Ryan Sieg	RSS Racing	Chevrolet	51.973	173.167
30	66	Justin Marks	Turn One Racing	Chevrolet	52.045	172.927
31	10	Jennifer Jo Cobb	JJC Racing	Ford	52.233	172.305
32	57	Norm Benning	Norm Benning Racing	Chevrolet	52.956	169.952
33	93	Shane Sieg	RSS Racing	Chevrolet	52.985	169.859
34	51	Aric Almirola	Vision Aviation Racing	Toyota	N/A	N/A
35	8	Nelson Piquet Jr. (R)	Kevin Harvick Incorporated	Chevrolet	N/A	N/A
36	9	Max Papis	Germain Racing	Toyota	51.594	174.439
Failed to Qualify
37	73	Rick Crawford	Tagsby Racing	Chevrolet	51.660	174.216
38	60	Cole Whitt (R)	Turn One Racing	Chevrolet	51.713	174.037
39	25	Tayler Malsam	Germain Racing	Toyota	51.920	173.344
40	27	Chris Eggleston	Winfield Motorsports	Dodge	51.963	173.200
41	76	Alli Owens	Ray Hackett Racing	Ford	52.323	172.008
42	45	Mike Skinner	Eddie Sharp Racing	Toyota	52.327	171.995
43	02	Jamie Dick	Corrie Stott Racing	Chevrolet	52.513	171.386
44	85	Brent Raymer	Brent Raymer Racing	Ford	52.573	171.191
45	28	Grant Enfinger	FDNY Racing	Chevrolet	52.921	170.065
46	68	Clay Greenfield	Alger Motorsports	Chevrolet	N/A	N/A

=== Race results ===
Pos	Grid	No.	Driver	Team	Manufacturer	Laps	Led	Status	Points
1	11	15	Michael Waltrip	Vision Aviation Racing	Toyota	103	1	running	0
2	6	2	Elliott Sadler	Kevin Harvick Inc.	Chevrolet	103	32	running	0
3	19	92	Clay Rogers	RBR Enterprises	Chevrolet	103	2	running	42
4	14	7	Miguel Paludo (R)	Red Horse Racing	Toyota	103	0	running	40
5	21	18	Kyle Busch	Kyle Busch Motorsports	Toyota	103	0	running	0
6	31	10	Jennifer Jo Cobb	Jennifer Jo Cobb Racing	Ford	103	0	running	0
7	23	1	Jeffery Earnhardt	Rick Ware Racing	Chevrolet	103	0	running	37
8	4	4	Ricky Carmichael	Turner Motorsports	Chevrolet	103	1	running	37
9	2	31	James Buescher	Turner Motorsports	Chevrolet	103	55	running	37
10	7	88	Matt Crafton	ThorSport Racing	Chevrolet	103	0	running	34
11	18	17	Timothy Peters	Red Horse Racing	Toyota	103	12	running	34
12	36	9	Max Papis	Germain Racing	Toyota	103	0	running	32
13	25	81	David Starr	SS-Green Light Racing	Toyota	103	0	running	31
14	33	93	Cole Whitt (R)	RSS Racing	Chevrolet	103	0	running	30
15	13	29	Parker Kligerman (R)	Brad Keselowski Racing	Dodge	103	0	running	29
16	28	46	Craig Goess (R)	Eddie Sharp Racing	Toyota	102	0	running	28
17	9	13	Johnny Sauter	ThorSport Racing	Chevrolet	101	0	running	27
18	17	77	Justin Lofton	Germain Racing	Toyota	98	0	running	26
19	16	84	Chris Fontaine	Glenden Enterprises	Toyota	96	0	crash	25
20	1	3	Austin Dillon	Richard Childress Racing	Chevrolet	96	0	crash	24
21	10	32	Brad Sweet	Turner Motorsports	Chevrolet	96	0	crash	23
22	34	51	Aric Almirola	Vision Aviation Racing	Toyota	96	0	crash	0
23	15	30	Todd Bodine	Germain Racing	Toyota	96	0	crash	21
24	30	66	Justin Marks	Turn One Racing	Chevrolet	96	0	running	20
25	29	39	Ryan Seig	RSS Racing	Chevrolet	91	0	battery	19
26	26	62	Brendan Gaughan	Germain Racing	Toyota	90	0	running	18
27	35	8	Nelson Piquet Jr. (R)	Kevin Harvick Inc.	Chevrolet	80	0	engine	17
28	3	33	Ron Hornaday Jr.	Kevin Harvick Inc.	Chevrolet	79	0	running	16
29	24	5	Travis Kvapil	Randy Moss Motorsports	Toyota	74	0	crash	15
30	12	23	Jason White	Joe Denette Motorsports	Chevrolet	74	0	crash	14
31	22	50	T. J. Bell	MAKE Motorsports	Chevrolet	74	0	crash	13
32	5	20	Johanna Long (R)	Panhandle Motorsports	Toyota	74	0	crash	12
33	27	07	Donnie Neuenberger	Rick Ware Racing	Chevrolet	70	0	crash	0
34	8	22	Joey Coulter (R)	Richard Childress Racing	Chevrolet	65	0	running	10
35	20	99	Chad McCumbee	Chase Mattioli Racing	Ford	24	0	clutch	9
36	32	57	Norm Benning	Norm Benning Racing	Chevrolet	22	0	engine	8

=== Standings after the race ===
Pos	Driver	Points
1	Clay Rogers	42
2	Miguel Paludo	40
3	Jeffrey Earnhardt	37
4	Ricky Carmichael	37
5	James Buescher	37
6	Timothy Peters	34
7	Matt Crafton	34
8	Max Papis	32
9	David Starr	31
10	Cole Whitt	30

== See also ==
- 2011 Daytona 500
