= Stephan McCurley =

American racing driver

- Born: Stephan K. McCurley; June 8, 1990 (age 36); Humble, Texas, U.S.

NASCAR FedEx Freight Truck Series career
- 1 race run over 1 year
- Best finish: 75th (2011)
- First race: 2011 WinStar World Casino 400K (Texas)
Wins	Top tens	Poles
0	0	0

ARCA Menards Series career
- 9 races run over 1 year
- Best finish: 24th (2009)
- First race: 2009 Kentuckiana Ford Dealers 200 (Salem)
- Last race: 2009 Kentuckiana Ford Dealers ARCA Fall Classic (Salem)
Wins	Top tens	Poles
0	2	0
- Statistics up to date as of July 4, 2023.

Stephan K. McCurley (born June 8, 1990) is an American professional stock car racing driver who has previously competed in the NASCAR Camping World Truck Series and the ARCA Racing Series.

== Racing career ==
In January 2009, it was announced that McCurley would attempt to run the full ARCA Re/Max Series schedule driving the No. 03 Chevrolet for PGM Racing. He would start the season by failing to qualify for the season opening race at Daytona International Speedway, before making his debut in the series at the next race at Salem Speedway, where he would run only fifteen laps of practice and would not make a qualifying attempt due to team replacing an engine and starting 23rd with a provisional, before running as high as seventh before an incident with a lapped vehicle on lap 131 relegated him to nineteenth. He would then finish in 23rd at the next race at Rockingham Speedway before finish in the top twenty in the next three races with a best finish of eleventh at Toledo Speedway. He would fail to finish at Pocono Raceway, placing 29th due to an engine issue before finishing in 20th at Michigan International Speedway. At Mansfield Motorsports Park, McCurley would get his first top-ten finish with a seventh-place finish. He would not attempt another race on the schedule after that until the series returned to Salem in September, where he would finish in sixth position after starting twelfth.

In July 2010, it was revealed that there were plans for McCurley to make his NASCAR Nationwide Series debut for Kevin Harvick Incorporated at Bristol Motor Speedway in the No. 51 Chevrolet, although this would never materialize. He would eventually attempt to make his debut in the series at Dover International Speedway driving his self owned No. 51, where he would ultimately fail to qualify. He would then attempt the following race at Kansas Speedway, where he would also fail to qualify.

In 2011, McCurley would attempt to make his NASCAR Camping World Truck Series debut at Kansas, driving the No. 65 Chevrolet for Tagsby Racing, where he would fail to qualify for the event. He would eventually qualify for the next race at Texas Motor Speedway, where he would start 34th and finish 32nd due to a clutch issue.

McCurley has recently competed in the World Series of Asphalt Stock Car Racing Series.

== Motorsports results ==
=== NASCAR ===
(key) (Bold – Pole position awarded by qualifying time. Italics – Pole position earned by points standings or practice time. * – Most laps led.)

==== Nationwide Series ====
NASCAR Nationwide Series results
Year	Team	No.	Make	1	2	3	4	5	6	7	8	9	10	11	12	13	14	15	16	17	18	19	20	21	22	23	24	25	26	27	28	29	30	31	32	33	34	35	NNSC	Pts	Ref
2010	Stephan McCurley Racing	51	Chevy	DAY	CAL	LVS	BRI	NSH	PHO	TEX	TAL	RCH	DAR	DOV	CLT	NSH	KEN	ROA	NHA	DAY	CHI	GTY	IRP	IOW	GLN	MCH	BRI	CGV	ATL	RCH	DOV; DNQ	KAN; DNQ	CAL	CLT	GTY	TEX	PHO	HOM	N/A	0	

==== Camping World Truck Series ====
NASCAR Camping World Truck Series results
Year	Team	No.	Make	1	2	3	4	5	6	7	8	9	10	11	12	13	14	15	16	17	18	19	20	21	22	23	24	25	NCWTC	Pts	Ref
2011	Tagsby Racing	65	Chevy	DAY	PHO	DAR	MAR	NSH	DOV	CLT	KAN; DNQ	TEX; 32	KEN	IOW	NSH	IRP	POC	MCH	BRI	ATL	CHI	NHA	KEN	LVS	TAL	MAR	TEX	HOM	75th	12	

=== ARCA Re/Max Series ===
(key) (Bold – Pole position awarded by qualifying time. Italics – Pole position earned by points standings or practice time. * – Most laps led.)

ARCA Re/Max Series results
Year	Team	No.	Make	1	2	3	4	5	6	7	8	9	10	11	12	13	14	15	16	17	18	19	20	21	ARMC	Pts	Ref
2009	PGM Racing	03	Chevy	DAY; DNQ	SLM; 19	CAR; 23	TAL; 19	KEN; 20	TOL; 11	POC; 29	MCH; 20	MFD; 7	IOW	KEN	BLN	POC	ISF	CHI	TOL	DSF	NJE	SLM; 6	KAN	CAR	24th	1575	
