= 2010 Food City 250 =

Race details
- Map of Speedway
- Date: August 20, 2010
- Official name: 2010 Food City 250
- Location: Bristol Motor Speedway in Bristol, Tennessee
- Course: Short Track
- Course length: 0.533 miles (0.858 km)
- Distance: 250 laps, 133.250 mi (214.445 km)
- Weather: Clear
- Average speed: 83.166 mph (133.843 km/h)
- Attendance: 112,000

Pole position
Driver	Elliott Sadler	Kevin Harvick Inc.
- Time: 15.934

Most laps led
Driver	Kyle Busch	Joe Gibbs Racing
- Laps: 116

Winner
No. 18	Kyle Busch	Joe Gibbs Racing

Television in the United States
- Network: ESPN
- Announcers: Marty Reid, Dale Jarrett, Andy Petree

The 2010 Food City 250 was a NASCAR Nationwide Series race held at Bristol Motor Speedway in Bristol, Tennessee on August 20, 2010. The race was the 29th iteration of the event and the 24th race of the 2010 NASCAR Nationwide Series. Elliott Sadler won the pole but it would be Kyle Busch who would dominate the race, leading the most laps and winning the race after he spun Brad Keselowski for the lead.

== Background ==
The Bristol Motor Speedway, formerly known as Bristol International Raceway and Bristol Raceway, is a NASCAR short track venue located in Bristol, Tennessee. Constructed in 1960, it held its first NASCAR race on July 30, 1961. Despite its short length, Bristol is among the most popular tracks on the NASCAR schedule because of its distinct features, which include extraordinarily steep banking, an all concrete surface, two pit roads, and stadium-like seating. It has also been named one of the loudest NASCAR tracks.

=== Entry list ===
- (R) denotes rookie driver

#	Driver	Team	Make
0	Brad Teague	JD Motorsports	Chevrolet
01	Mike Wallace	JD Motorsports	Chevrolet
1	Ryan Newman	Phoenix Racing	Chevrolet
04	Jeremy Clements	JD Motorsports	Chevrolet
05	Willie Allen	Day Enterprise Racing	Chevrolet
6	Ricky Stenhouse Jr. (R)	Roush Fenway Racing	Ford
7	Josh Wise	JR Motorsports	Chevrolet
09	John Wes Townley	RAB Racing	Ford
10	Jason Leffler	Braun Racing	Toyota
11	Brian Scott (R)	Braun Racing	Toyota
12	Justin Allgaier	Penske Racing	Dodge
15	Michael Annett	Germain Racing	Toyota
16	Brian Ickler	Roush Fenway Racing	Ford
18	Kyle Busch	Joe Gibbs Racing	Toyota
20	Joey Logano	Joe Gibbs Racing	Toyota
21	Clint Bowyer	Richard Childress Racing	Chevrolet
22	Brad Keselowski	Penske Racing	Dodge
23	Robert Richardson Jr.	R3 Motorsports	Chevrolet
24	Eric McClure	Team Rensi Motorsports	Ford
26	Dennis Setzer	K-Automotive Motorsports	Dodge
27	Danny O'Quinn Jr.	Baker Curb Racing	Ford
28	Kenny Wallace	Jay Robinson Racing	Chevrolet
32	Reed Sorenson	Braun Racing	Toyota
33	Elliott Sadler	Kevin Harvick Inc.	Chevrolet
34	Tony Raines	TriStar Motorsports	Chevrolet
35	Jason Keller	TriStar Motorsports	Chevrolet
36	Jeff Green	Front Row Motorsports	Chevrolet
38	Kasey Kahne	Braun Racing	Toyota
39	Sean Caisse	Go Green Racing	Ford
40	Mike Bliss	Key Motorsports	Chevrolet
42	Parker Kligerman	Team 42 Racing	Dodge
43	Drew Herring	Baker Curb Racing	Ford
49	Mark Green	Jay Robinson Racing	Chevrolet
52	Chris Lawson	Means Racing	Chevrolet
56	Kevin Lepage	Mac Hill Motorsports	Chevrolet
60	Carl Edwards	Roush Fenway Racing	Ford
61	J. J. Yeley	Specialty Racing	Ford
62	Brendan Gaughan	Rusty Wallace Racing	Toyota
66	Steve Wallace	Rusty Wallace Racing	Toyota
70	Shelby Howard	ML Motorsports	Chevrolet
73	Derrike Cope	Stratus Racing Group	Dodge
76	Ryan Hackett	Ray Hackett Racing	Ford
81	Michael McDowell	MacDonald Motorsports	Dodge
87	Joe Nemechek	NEMCO Motorsports	Chevrolet
88	Dale Earnhardt Jr.	JR Motorsports	Chevrolet
89	Morgan Shepherd	Faith Motorsports	Chevrolet
90	Chase Miller	D'Hondt Humphrey Motorsports	Chevrolet
91	David Gilliland	D'Hondt Humphrey Motorsports	Chevrolet
98	Paul Menard	Roush Fenway Racing	Ford
99	Trevor Bayne	Diamond-Waltrip Racing	Toyota
Official Entry list

== Qualifying ==
Elliott Sadler won the pole for the race with a time of 15.934 and a speed of 120.422. The biggest surprise was when Willie Allen qualified the Day Enterprise Racing No. 05 car in 7th on the grid.

Grid	No.	Driver	Team	Manufacturer	Time	Speed
1	33	Elliott Sadler	Kevin Harvick Inc.	Chevrolet	15.934	120.422
2	20	Joey Logano	Joe Gibbs Racing	Toyota	15.962	120.210
3	18	Kyle Busch	Joe Gibbs Racing	Toyota	15.978	120.090
4	12	Justin Allgaier	Penske Racing	Dodge	15.986	120.030
5	66	Steve Wallace	Rusty Wallace Racing	Toyota	15.988	120.015
6	10	Jason Leffler	Braun Racing	Toyota	16.010	119.850
7	05	Willie Allen	Day Enterprise Racing	Chevrolet	16.014	119.820
8	21	Clint Bowyer	Richard Childress Racing	Chevrolet	16.023	119.753
9	1	Ryan Newman	Phoenix Racing	Chevrolet	16.038	119.641
10	60	Carl Edwards	Roush Fenway Racing	Ford	16.055	119.514
11	32	Reed Sorenson	Braun Racing	Toyota	16.063	119.455
12	39	Sean Caisse	Go Green Racing	Ford	16.093	119.232
13	22	Brad Keselowski	Penske Racing	Dodge	16.094	119.225
14	98	Paul Menard	Roush Fenway Racing	Ford	16.102	119.165
15	81	Michael McDowell	MacDonald Motorsports	Dodge	16.107	119.128
16	28	Kenny Wallace	Jay Robinson Racing	Chevrolet	16.116	119.062
17	99	Trevor Bayne	Diamond Waltrip Racing	Toyota	16.119	119.040
18	35	Jason Keller	TriStar Motorsports	Chevrolet	16.119	119.040
19	26	Dennis Setzer	K-Automotive Motorsports	Dodge	16.148	118.826
20	04	Jeremy Clements	JD Motorsports	Chevrolet	16.149	118.819
21	27	Danny O'Quinn Jr.	Baker Curb Racing	Ford	16.152	118.796
22	73	Derrike Cope	Stratus Racing Group	Dodge	16.154	118.782
23	15	Michael Annett	Germain Racing	Toyota	16.164	118.708
24	90	Chase Miller	D'Hondt Humphrey Motorsports	Chevrolet	16.169	118.672
25	62	Brendan Gaughan	Rusty Wallace Racing	Toyota	16.180	118.591
26	91	David Gilliland	D'Hondt Humphrey Motorsports	Chevrolet	16.182	118.576
27	36	Jeff Green	Front Row Motorsports	Chevrolet	16.191	118.510
28	49	Mark Green	Jay Robinson Racing	Chevrolet	16.202	118.430
29	87	Joe Nemechek	NEMCO Motorsports	Chevrolet	16.210	118.371
30	11	Brian Scott (R)	Braun Racing	Toyota	16.213	118.349
31	6	Ricky Stenhouse Jr. (R)	Roush Fenway Racing	Ford	16.216	118.328
32	7	Josh Wise	JR Motorsports	Chevrolet	16.219	118.306
33	70	Shelby Howard	ML Motorsports	Chevrolet	16.254	118.051
34	88	Dale Earnhardt Jr.	JR Motorsports	Chevrolet	16.269	117.942
35	0	Brad Teague	JD Motorsports	Chevrolet	16.278	117.877
36	16	Brian Ickler	Roush Fenway Racing	Ford	16.325	117.538
37	38	Kasey Kahne	Braun Racing	Toyota	16.358	117.300
38	34	Tony Raines*	TriStar Motorsports	Chevrolet	16.358	117.300
39	09	John Wes Townley*	RAB Racing	Ford	16.424	116.829
40	23	Robert Richardson Jr.*	R3 Motorsports	Chevrolet	16.559	115.877
41	40	Mike Bliss*	Key Motorsports	Chevrolet	16.671	115.098
42	01	Mike Wallace*	JD Motorsports	Chevrolet	—	—
43	42	Parker Kligerman	Team 42 Racing	Dodge	16.285	117.826
Failed to Qualify, withdrew, or driver changes
44	56	Kevin Lepage	Mac Hill Motorsports	Chevrolet	16.290	117.790
45	24	Eric McClure	Team Rensi Motorsports	Ford	16.315	117.610
46	43	Drew Herring	Baker Curb Racing	Ford	16.326	117.530
47	89	Morgan Shepherd	Faith Motorsports	Chevrolet	16.354	117.329
48	76	Ryan Hackett	Ray Hackett Racing	Ford	16.473	116.482
49	61	J. J. Yeley	Specialty Racing	Ford	16.552	115.926
50	52	Chris Lawson	Means Racing	Chevrolet	16.655	115.209
Official Starting grid

* - Made the field via owners points.

== Race ==
Outside pole sitter Joey Logano took the lead from pole sitter Elliott Sadler and Logano led the first lap of the race. On lap 31, Kyle Busch took the lead from his teammate. The first caution of the race flew on lap 56 for debris in turn 3. Kyle Busch won the race off of pit road but Brad Keselowski did not pit and Keselowski led the field to the restart on lap 62. On the restart, Busch took the lead from Keselowski immeadietly. On lap 82, a big and strange crash would occur in turn 1. It started when Justin Allgaier went to pass a lap car in Robert Richardson Jr. but Allgaier got stuck in the middle in between Trevor Bayne and Kasey Kahne. Allgaier made contact with Bayne which barely shot him up into Kahne and Allgaier squeezed Kahne into the outside wall on the frontstretch to a point where Kahne's right side tires climbed onto the wall and Kahne's car rode the wall all the way through turn 1 bringing out the second caution of the race. The race would restart on lap 91. On lap 117, the third caution would fly when Ryan Newman blew a right front tire and hit the outside wall in turn 2. Kyle Busch won the race off of pit road but Carl Edwards, Elliott Sadler, Ricky Stenhouse Jr., Parker Kligerman, and Michael McDowell did not pit and Edwards led the field to the restart on lap 124. On lap 129, Elliott Sadler took the lead from Edwards. On lap 135, Kyle Busch attempted to take the lead from Sadler but failed to get in front of him. Busch tried again on lap 143 but ended up losing second and third in the process.

=== Final laps ===
On lap 155, Clint Bowyer took the lead from Sadler. One lap later, Joe Nemechek hit the wall in turns 1 and 2 after he got bumped by Mike Bliss and had right rear damage and was slow. Two laps later on lap 158, Nemechek got hit in the side off of turn 4 by Sean Caisse and both Nemechek and Caisse crashed on the frontstretch right in front of Bowyer who hit Mike Wallace from behind and turned Wallace towards where Nemechek and Caisse crashed and gave Bowyer right front damage. This also brought out the 4th caution of the race. Bowyer came in and pitted to fix the fender and gave the lead to Brad Keselowski and Keselowski led the field to the restart on lap 166. On lap 187, the 5th caution flew when Justin Allgaier crashed in turns 3 and 4 after he made contact with Jason Keller while also collecting Josh Wise in the process. The race would restart on lap 193. At around 40 laps to go, Kyle Busch and Brad Keselowski fought hard for the lead. Busch attempted to pass Keselowski multiple times until with 32 to go when he got in front of Keselowski in turn 2. Busch attempted the slide job which looked like it paid off for him. However, Keselowski did not lift and ran into the rear of Busch and put him in the wall on the backstretch and Keselowski took it back. This flustered Kyle and Busch decided to immediately take out his frustrations on Keselowski and Busch retaliated by hitting Keselowski's left rear corner panel enough that caused Keselowski to spin in turn 4 and slap the left front into the outside wall and bring out the 6th caution of the race. Keselowski was the points leader coming into the race 347 points ahead of Carl Edwards while Busch was in 3rd 503 back. Busch was the new leader and he never gave it up as the race restarted with 26 laps to go. With 25 to go, a stack up occurred on the frontstretch bringing out the 7th caution. It started when Jason Leffler bumped Joey Logano from behind off of turn 4 and caused Logano to spin. Others checked up but ran into each other causing others to crash and spin like Michael Annett, Clint Bowyer, Brad Keselowski, Reed Sorenson, Brendan Gaughan, Steve Wallace, and Paul Menard. 9 cars were involved in the accident. The race restarted with 17 laps to go. With 16 to go, the 8th and final caution flew when Reed Sorenson and Brian Scott made contact that sent Scott up in front of Brendan Gaughan where Gaughan bumped Scott in turn 2 turning Scott around before Gaughan got spun after he got bumped by Willie Allen. The race would restart with 10 laps to go. Kyle Busch took the lead and held onto it as Busch would win his 10th race of the 2010 season. Jason Leffler, Elliott Sadler, Dale Earnhardt Jr., and Carl Edwards rounded out the top 5 while Trevor Bayne, Clint Bowyer, Reed Sorenson, Parker Kligerman, and Joey Logano rounded out the top 10. As soon as Busch got out of his car after doing his burnouts, fans in the stands immeadietly boo'd him and Busch gestured back at them first putting his arms out and then doing a crybaby sign back at the fans before getting the checkered flag. When asked about spinning Keselowski, Busch did admit he dumped him on purpose because Keselowski did not do a "Earnhardt crossover move" and instead ran into the back of him. Busch also quoted "you play that game, I'll play it back. So I dumped him."

Eventually, the feud between Keselowski and Busch came into the Cup Series race the following night, this time during driver intros where the drivers would introduce themselves to the crowd. Once again, Busch was boo'd by the Bristol crowd and sarcastically stated "all of yall are so loving! Thank you!" before he told the crowd his name, his car, and his slogan which was "ready to win it again," since Busch had won the Truck Series race the night before the Nationwide race, and walked off. Behind Busch was actually Keselowski. Keselowski picked up the microphone and said "Brad Keselowski, driver of the Penske racing Dodge, Kyle Busch is an ass!" and walked off to the cheers of the fans in attendance. The reason Keselowski did it was to express how he felt but also was because of the conversation he had between him and Juan Pablo Montoya about it to which Montoya said "I wouldn't do it." to where Keselowski said "Hell yeah I'll do it!" Keselowski then asked the preacher "would you be offended if I said 'Ass?'" to which the preacher replied "No man! 'Ass' is in the bible." and allowed Keselowski to do it anyway. But Busch would have the last laugh as he made NASCAR history by being the first driver to sweep the whole Bristol event by winning a Truck race, Nationwide series race, and Cup series race on the same weekend at Bristol. When asked about Keselowski's comments Busch replied "Who? I don't know who you're talking about." and then being told Keselowski drives the 12 car which Busch replied "I saw it, but I passed it." after Busch lapped him during the race.

== Race results ==
Pos	Car	Driver	Team	Manufacturer	Laps Run	Laps Led	Status	Points
1	18	Kyle Busch	Joe Gibbs Racing	Toyota	250	116	running	195
2	10	Jason Leffler	Braun Racing	Toyota	250	0	running	170
3	33	Elliott Sadler	Kevin Harvick Inc.	Chevrolet	250	26	running	170
4	88	Dale Earnhardt Jr.	JR Motorsports	Chevrolet	250	0	running	160
5	60	Carl Edwards	Roush Fenway Racing	Ford	250	9	running	160
6	99	Trevor Bayne	Diamond-Waltrip Racing	Toyota	250	0	running	150
7	21	Clint Bowyer	Richard Childress Racing	Chevrolet	250	7	running	151
8	32	Reed Sorenson	Braun Racing	Toyota	250	0	running	142
9	42	Parker Kligerman	Team 42 Racing	Dodge	250	0	running	138
10	20	Joey Logano	Joe Gibbs Racing	Toyota	250	30	running	139
11	05	Willie Allen	Day Enterprise Racing	Chevrolet	250	0	running	130
12	35	Jason Keller	TriStar Motorsports	Chevrolet	250	0	running	127
13	98	Paul Menard	Roush Fenway Racing	Ford	250	0	running	124
14	22	Brad Keselowski	Penske Racing	Dodge	250	62	running	126
15	7	Josh Wise	JR Motorsports	Chevrolet	250	0	running	118
16	27	Danny O'Quinn Jr.	Baker Curb Racing	Ford	250	0	running	115
17	40	Mike Bliss	Key Motorsports	Chevrolet	250	0	running	112
18	15	Michael Annett	Germain Racing	Toyota	250	0	running	109
19	16	Brian Ickler	Roush Fenway Racing	Ford	250	0	running	106
20	81	Michael McDowell	MacDonald Motorsports	Dodge	250	0	running	103
21	62	Brendan Gaughan	Rusty Wallace Racing	Toyota	250	0	running	100
22	6	Ricky Stenhouse Jr. (R)	Roush Fenway Racing	Ford	250	0	running	97
23	04	Jeremy Clements	JD Motorsports	Chevrolet	250	0	running	94
24	70	Shelby Howard	ML Motorsports	Chevrolet	250	0	running	91
25	11	Brian Scott (R)	Braun Racing	Toyota	249	0	running	88
26	34	Tony Raines	TriStar Motorsports	Chevrolet	248	0	running	85
27	09	John Wes Townley	RAB Racing	Ford	247	0	running	82
28	23	Robert Richardson Jr.	R3 Motorsports	Chevrolet	247	0	running	79
29	28	Kenny Wallace	Jay Robinson Racing	Chevrolet	245	0	running	76
30	66	Steve Wallace	Rusty Wallace Racing	Toyota	244	0	running	73
31	01	Mike Wallace	JD Motorsports	Chevrolet	226	0	running	70
32	87	Joe Nemechek	NEMCO Motorsports	Chevrolet	204	0	running	67
33	12	Justin Allgaier	Penske Racing	Dodge	186	0	crash	64
34	39	Sean Caisse	Go Green Racing	Ford	155	0	crash	61
35	1	Ryan Newman	Phoenix Racing	Chevrolet	117	0	crash	58
36	49	Mark Green	Jay Robinson Racing	Chevrolet	84	0	suspension	55
37	38	Kasey Kahne	Braun Racing	Toyota	81	0	crash	52
38	0	Brad Teague	JD Motorsports	Chevrolet	42	0	brakes	49
39	73	Derrike Cope	Stratus Racing Group	Dodge	30	0	brakes	46
40	90	Chase Miller	D'Hondt-Humphrey Motorsports	Chevrolet	25	0	electrical	43
41	91	David Gilliland	D'Hondt Humphrey Motorsports	Chevrolet	22	0	brakes	40
42	26	Dennis Setzer	K-Automotive Motorsports	Dodge	6	0	brakes	37
43	36	Jeff Green	Front Row Motorsports	Chevrolet	4	0	brakes	34
Official Race results

Previous race: 2010 Carfax 250	NASCAR Nationwide Series; 2010 season	Next race: 2010 NAPA Auto Parts 200
