= 2010 Scotts Turf Builder 300 =

Race details
- Map of Speedway
- Date: March 20, 2010
- Official name: 2010 Scotts Turf Builder 300
- Location: Bristol Motor Speedway in Bristol, Tennessee
- Course: Short Track
- Course length: 0.533 miles (0.858 km)
- Distance: 300 laps, 159.900 mi (257.334 km)
- Weather: Clear
- Average speed: 76.609 mph (123.290 km/h)
- Attendance: 85,000

Pole position
Driver	Brad Keselowski	Penske Racing
- Time: 15.405

Most laps led
Driver	Brad Keselowski	Penske Racing
- Laps: 72

Winner
No. 12	Justin Allgaier	Penske Racing

Television in the United States
- Network: ABC
- Announcers: Marty Reid, Dale Jarrett, Andy Petree

The 2010 Scotts Turf Builder 300 was a NASCAR Nationwide Series race held at Bristol Motor Speedway in Bristol, Tennessee on March 20, 2010. The race was 28th iteration of the event and the 4th race of the 2010 NASCAR Nationwide Series. The event was dominated by Penske Racing as Brad Keselowski won the pole and led the most laps. But it was Justin Allgaier who would hold off Cup Series regulars like Keselowski, Kyle Busch, Carl Edwards, Kevin Harvick, and Greg Biffle to win his first career Nationwide Series race in his 43rd Nationwide Series start.

== Background ==
The Bristol Motor Speedway, formerly known as Bristol International Raceway and Bristol Raceway, is a NASCAR short track venue located in Bristol, Tennessee. Constructed in 1960, it held its first NASCAR race on July 30, 1961. Despite its short length, Bristol is among the most popular tracks on the NASCAR schedule because of its distinct features, which include extraordinarily steep banking, an all concrete surface, two pit roads, and stadium-like seating. It has also been named one of the loudest NASCAR tracks.

=== Entry list ===
- (R) denotes rookie driver

#	Driver	Team	Make
01	Mike Wallace	JD Motorsports	Chevrolet
1	James Buescher (R)	Phoenix Racing	Chevrolet
02	Andy Ponstein	Corrie Stott Racing	Chevrolet
04	Brad Teague	JD Motorsports	Chevrolet
05	Willie Allen	Day Enterprise Racing	Chevrolet
6	Ricky Stenhouse Jr. (R)	Roush Fenway Racing	Ford
7	Scott Wimmer	JR Motorsports	Chevrolet
09	Scott Riggs	RAB Racing	Ford
10	Jason Leffler	Braun Racing	Toyota
11	Brian Scott (R)	Braun Racing	Toyota
12	Justin Allgaier	Penske Racing	Dodge
15	Michael Annett	Germain Racing	Toyota
16	Colin Braun (R)	Roush Fenway Racing	Ford
18	Kyle Busch	Joe Gibbs Racing	Toyota
20	Joey Logano	Joe Gibbs Racing	Toyota
21	John Wes Townley	Richard Childress Racing	Chevrolet
22	Brad Keselowski	Penske Racing	Dodge
23	Coleman Pressley	R3 Motorsports	Chevrolet
24	Eric McClure	Team Rensi Motorsports	Ford
26	Brian Keselowski	K-Automotive Motorsports	Dodge
27	Greg Biffle	Baker Curb Racing	Ford
28	Kenny Wallace	Jay Robinson Racing	Chevrolet
32	Reed Sorenson	Braun Racing	Toyota
33	Kevin Harvick	Kevin Harvick Inc.	Chevrolet
34	Tony Raines	TriStar Motorsports	Chevrolet
35	Jason Keller	TriStar Motorsports	Chevrolet
38	Kasey Kahne	Braun Racing	Toyota
39	Jason Bowles	Go Green Racing	Ford
40	Mike Bliss	Key Motorsports	Chevrolet
42	Parker Kligerman	Team 42 Racing	Dodge
43	Scott Lagasse Jr.	Baker Curb Racing	Ford
49	Mark Green	Jay Robinson Racing	Chevrolet
52	Chris Lawson	Means Racing	Ford
56	Kevin Lepage	Mac Hill Motorsports	Chevrolet
60	Carl Edwards	Roush Fenway Racing	Ford
61	Josh Wise	Specialty Racing	Ford
62	Brendan Gaughan	Rusty Wallace Racing	Toyota
66	Steve Wallace	Rusty Wallace Racing	Toyota
70	Shelby Howard	ML Motorsports	Chevrolet
73	Derrike Cope	Stratus Racing Group	Dodge
81	Michael McDowell	MacDonald Motorsports	Dodge
87	Joe Nemechek	NEMCO Motorsports	Chevrolet
88	Kelly Bires	JR Motorsports	Chevrolet
89	Morgan Shepherd	Faith Motorsports	Chevrolet
90	Danny O'Quinn Jr.	D'Hondt Humphrey Motorsports	Chevrolet
91	David Gilliland	D'Hondt Humphrey Motorsports	Chevrolet
92	Johnny Chapman	K-Automotive Motorsports	Dodge
96	Dennis Setzer	K-Automotive Motorsports	Dodge
98	Paul Menard	Roush Fenway Racing	Ford
99	Trevor Bayne	Diamond-Waltrip Racing	Toyota
Official Entry list

== Qualifying ==
Brad Keselowski won the pole for the race with a time of 15.405 and a speed of 124.557.

Grid	No.	Driver	Team	Manufacturer	Time	Speed
1	22	Brad Keselowski	Penske Racing	Dodge	15.405	124.557
2	20	Joey Logano	Joe Gibbs Racing	Toyota	15.415	124.476
3	88	Kelly Bires	JR Motorsports	Chevrolet	15.428	124.371
4	60	Carl Edwards	Roush Fenway Racing	Ford	15.484	123.921
5	27	Greg Biffle	Baker Curb Racing	Ford	15.544	123.443
6	18	Kyle Busch	Joe Gibbs Racing	Toyota	15.589	123.087
7	38	Kasey Kahne	Braun Racing	Toyota	15.615	122.882
8	32	Reed Sorenson	Braun Racing	Toyota	15.616	122.874
9	66	Steve Wallace	Rusty Wallace Racing	Toyota	15.617	122.866
10	10	Jason Leffler	Braun Racing	Toyota	15.623	122.819
11	87	Joe Nemechek	NEMCO Motorsports	Chevrolet	15.674	122.419
12	1	James Buescher (R)	Phoenix Racing	Chevrolet	15.692	122.279
13	33	Kevin Harvick	Kevin Harvick Inc.	Chevrolet	15.697	122.240
14	21	John Wes Townley	Richard Childress Racing	Chevrolet	15.700	122.217
15	70	Shelby Howard	ML Motorsports	Chevrolet	15.714	122.108
16	90	Danny O'Quinn Jr.	D'Hondt Humphrey Motorsports	Chevrolet	15.738	121.921
17	05	Willie Allen	Day Enterprise Racing	Chevrolet	15.750	121.829
18	99	Trevor Bayne	Diamond-Waltrip Racing	Toyota	15.751	121.821
19	7	Scott Wimmer	JR Motorsports	Chevrolet	15.753	121.805
20	16	Colin Braun (R)	Roush Fenway Racing	Ford	15.759	121.759
21	56	Kevin Lepage	Mac Hill Motorsports	Chevrolet	15.760	121.751
22	62	Brendan Gaughan	Rusty Wallace Racing	Toyota	15.767	121.697
23	11	Brian Scott (R)	Braun Racing	Toyota	15.786	121.551
24	6	Ricky Stenhouse Jr. (R)	Roush Fenway Racing	Ford	15.801	121.435
25	34	Tony Raines	TriStar Motorsports	Chevrolet	15.817	121.313
26	02	Andy Ponstein	Corrie Stott Racing	Chevrolet	15.818	121.305
27	43	Scott Lagasse Jr.	Baker Curb Racing	Ford	15.841	121.129
28	98	Paul Menard	Roush Fenway Racing	Ford	15.850	121.060
29	91	David Gilliland	D'Hondt Humphrey Motorsports	Chevrolet	15.857	121.006
30	12	Justin Allgaier	Penske Racing	Dodge	15.871	120.900
31	28	Kenny Wallace	Jay Robinson Racing	Chevrolet	15.885	120.793
32	61	Josh Wise	Specialty Racing	Ford	15.910	120.603
33	92	Johnny Chapman	K-Automotive Motorsports	Dodge	15.916	120.558
34	89	Morgan Shepherd	Faith Motorsports	Chevrolet	15.917	120.550
35	01	Mike Wallace	JD Motorsports	Chevrolet	15.921	120.520
36	35	Jason Keller	TriStar Motorsports	Chevrolet	15.924	120.497
37	23	Coleman Pressley	R3 Motorsports	Chevrolet	15.934	120.422
38	15	Michael Annett	Germain Racing	Toyota	15.989	120.008
39	26	Brian Keselowski	K-Automotive Motorsports	Dodge	15.997	119.947
40	81	Michael McDowell	MacDonald Motorsports	Dodge	16.003	119.903
41	40	Mike Bliss*	Key Motorsports	Chevrolet	16.075	119.365
42	24	Eric McClure*	Team Rensi Motorsports	Ford	16.386	117.100
43	73	Derrike Cope	Stratus Racing Group	Dodge	16.007	119.873
Failed to Qualify, withdrew, or driver changes
44	96	Dennis Setzer	K-Automotive Motorsports	Dodge	16.010	119.850
45	49	Mark Green	Jay Robinson Racing	Chevrolet	16.021	119.768
46	09	Scott Riggs	RAB Racing	Ford	16.027	119.723
47	39	Jason Bowles	Go Green Racing	Ford	16.194	118.488
48	04	Brad Teague	JD Motorsports	Chevrolet	16.324	117.545
49	42	Parker Kligerman	Team 42 Racing	Dodge	16.422	116.843
50	52	Chris Lawson	Means Racing	Ford	—	—
Official Starting grid

* - Made the field via owners points.

== Race ==
Outside pole sitter Joey Logano took the lead from pole sitter Brad Keselowski and Logano led the first lap of the race. At around lap 10, James Buescher hit the wall on the frontstretch after he came across the nose of Trevor Bayne but no caution was thrown. On lap 21, Kyle Busch attempted to take the lead from his teammate and made a great pass by splitting the lapped car in Derrike Cope three wide and Busch took the lead on lap 22. On lap 30, the first caution flew when Brian Keselowski crashed in turn 3 after he got turned by James Buescher. The race would restart on lap 36. On lap 53, the second caution flew for debris on the frontstretch. The race would restart on lap 60. On lap 80, Kasey Kahne took the lead from Busch. On lap 90, the third caution flew for a big four car accident in turn 1. It started when rookie Brian Scott got turned by Scott Wimmer in turn 1 and Scott spun up the track where he collected another rookie in Colin Braun when Steve Wallace came flying in without knowing there was a wreck and Wallace hit Braun from behind and ended up underneath Braun's car. All drivers were okay. The race was red flagged for about 10 minutes to clean up the accident. Kyle Busch won the race off of pit road but Scott Wimmer, Kelly Bires, Ricky Stenhouse Jr., and Coleman Pressley did not pit and Wimmer led the field to the restart on lap 96. On lap 114, Kasey Kahne took the lead from Wimmer. On lap 123, Carl Edwards took the lead. On lap 124, the 4th caution flew when James Buescher retaliated for the earlier incident and spun Trevor Bayne and himself in turn 2 while Coleman Pressley spun after he got turned by another car afterwards trying to avoid the accident. The race would restart on lap 133. On lap 146, the 5th caution flew when Kelly Bires crashed in turn four after he got turned by Kyle Busch. Some drivers pitted like Carl Edwards while others stayed out including Greg Biffle and Biffle led the field to the restart on lap 151. On lap 187, the 6th caution flew for a 6 car crash in turns 1 and 2. It started when Tony Raines got loose on the frontstretch and came back up in turn 1 and turned Shelby Howard around in front of the leaders. Howard slid down and collected Brendan Gaughan and Kasey Kahne in the process while it also collected Kenny Wallace and Trevor Bayne.

=== Final laps ===
Rookie Ricky Stenhouse Jr. was the new leader and Stenhouse led the field to the restart on lap 197. On the restart, Jason Leffler took the lead. On lap 199, the 7th caution flew for debris on the frontstretch. The race would restart on lap 203. On the restart, Brad Keselowski took the lead from Leffler. On lap 207, the 8th caution would fly when Joe Nemechek crashed in turn 4 after he got spun by Derrike Cope after Cope got loose. The race would restart on lap 212. On lap 227, the 9th caution would fly when Coleman Pressley crashed on the frontstretch after contact with Mike Bliss. The race would restart on lap 233. With 50 laps to go, the 10th caution would fly when Ricky Stenhouse Jr. crashed on the frontstretch after contact with Michael Annett. The race would restart with 44 laps to go. With 34 to go, the 11th and final caution would fly for a five car crash in turn two. It started when John Wes Townley got turned by Jason Keller and both crashed into the outside wall while Tony Raines, Josh Wise, and Eric McClure all crashed behind them trying to avoid the wreck. The race would restart with 27 laps to go. On the restart, Justin Allgaier took the lead from Keselowski. Keselowski tried to take it back but couldn't and Justin Allgaier held off many Cup Series regulars behind him to win his first ever Nationwide Series race in his 43rd start and Keselowski finished in 2nd. Kyle Busch, Carl Edwards, and Kevin Harvick rounded out the top 5 while Greg Biffle, Reed Sorenson, Mike Bliss, Jason Leffler, and Scott Wimmer rounded out the top 10.

== Race results ==
Pos	Car	Driver	Team	Manufacturer	Laps Run	Laps Led	Status	Points
1	12	Justin Allgaier	Penske Racing	Dodge	300	27	running	190
2	22	Brad Keselowski	Penske Racing	Dodge	300	72	running	180
3	18	Kyle Busch	Joe Gibbs Racing	Toyota	300	59	running	170
4	60	Carl Edwards	Roush Fenway Racing	Ford	300	24	running	165
5	33	Kevin Harvick	Kevin Harvick Inc.	Chevrolet	300	0	running	155
6	27	Greg Biffle	Baker Curb Racing	Ford	300	44	running	155
7	32	Reed Sorenson	Braun Racing	Toyota	300	0	running	146
8	40	Mike Bliss	Key Motorsports	Chevrolet	300	0	running	142
9	10	Jason Leffler	Braun Racing	Toyota	300	6	running	143
10	7	Scott Wimmer	JR Motorsports	Chevrolet	300	24	running	139
11	98	Paul Menard	Roush Fenway Racing	Ford	300	0	running	130
12	88	Kelly Bires	JR Motorsports	Chevrolet	300	0	running	127
13	43	Scott Lagasse Jr.	Baker Curb Racing	Ford	300	0	running	124
14	20	Joey Logano	Joe Gibbs Racing	Toyota	300	21	running	126
15	05	Willie Allen	Day Enterprise Racing	Chevrolet	300	0	running	118
16	87	Joe Nemechek	NEMCO Motorsports	Chevrolet	300	0	running	115
17	01	Mike Wallace	JD Motorsports	Chevrolet	300	0	running	112
18	81	Michael McDowell	MacDonald Motorsports	Dodge	300	0	running	109
19	28	Kenny Wallace	Jay Robinson Racing	Chevrolet	298	0	running	106
20	15	Michael Annett	Germain Racing	Toyota	298	0	running	103
21	02	Andy Ponstein	Corrie Stott Racing	Chevrolet	296	0	running	100
22	34	Tony Raines	TriStar Motorsports	Chevrolet	295	0	running	97
23	61	Josh Wise	Specialty Racing	Ford	295	0	running	94
24	24	Eric McClure	Team Rensi Motorsports	Ford	294	0	running	91
25	6	Ricky Stenhouse Jr. (R)	Roush Fenway Racing	Ford	267	4	running	93
26	21	John Wes Townley	Richard Childress Racing	Chevrolet	265	0	crash	85
27	35	Jason Keller	TriStar Motorsports	Chevrolet	265	0	crash	82
28	73	Derrike Cope	Stratus Racing Group	Dodge	259	0	running	79
29	11	Brian Scott (R)	Braun Racing	Toyota	256	0	running	76
30	99	Trevor Bayne	Diamond-Waltrip Racing	Toyota	244	0	running	73
31	23	Coleman Pressley	R3 Motorsports	Chevrolet	227	0	crash	70
32	38	Kasey Kahne	Braun Racing	Toyota	188	22	crash	72
33	62	Brendan Gaughan	Rusty Wallace Racing	Toyota	186	0	crash	64
34	70	Shelby Howard	ML Motorsports	Chevrolet	185	0	crash	61
35	89	Morgan Shepherd	Faith Motorsports	Chevrolet	160	0	handling	58
36	1	James Buescher (R)	Phoenix Racing	Chevrolet	109	0	crash	55
37	16	Colin Braun (R)	Roush Fenway Racing	Ford	89	0	crash	52
38	66	Steve Wallace	Rusty Wallace Racing	Toyota	89	0	crash	49
39	26	Brian Keselowski	K-Automotive Motorsports	Dodge	29	0	crash	46
40	56	Kevin Lepage	Mac Hill Motorsports	Chevrolet	23	0	transmission	43
41	90	Danny O'Quinn Jr.	D'Hondt Humphrey Motorsports	Chevrolet	21	0	brakes	40
42	91	David Gilliland	D'Hondt Humphrey Motorsports	Chevrolet	16	0	brakes	37
43	92	Johnny Chapman	K-Automotive Motorsports	Dodge	3	0	rear end	34
Official Race results

Previous race: 2010 Sam's Town 300	NASCAR Nationwide Series; 2010 season	Next race: 2010 Nashville 300
