= 2010 NASCAR Nationwide Series =

American motorsport season

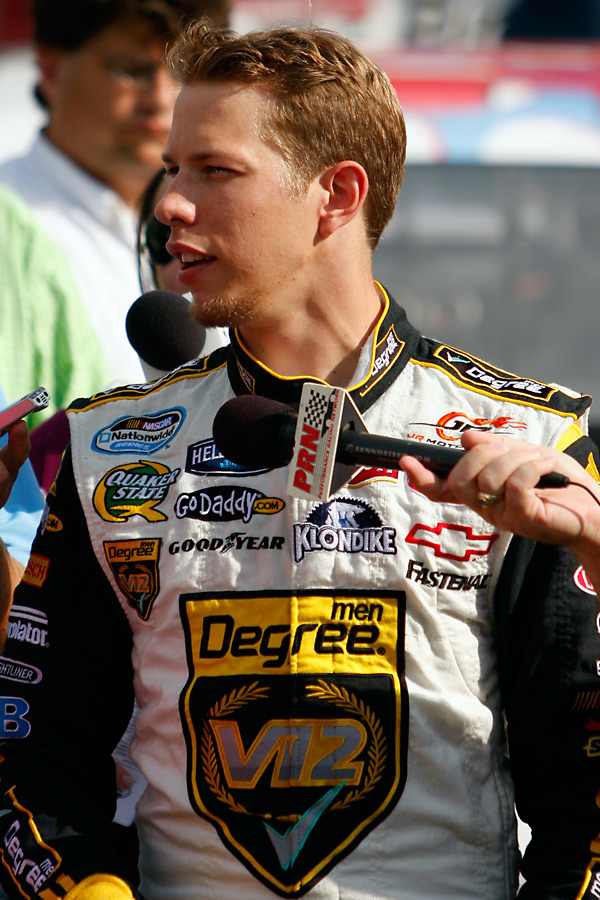
Brad Keselowski, the 2010 Nationwide Series champion, driving for Penske Racing.

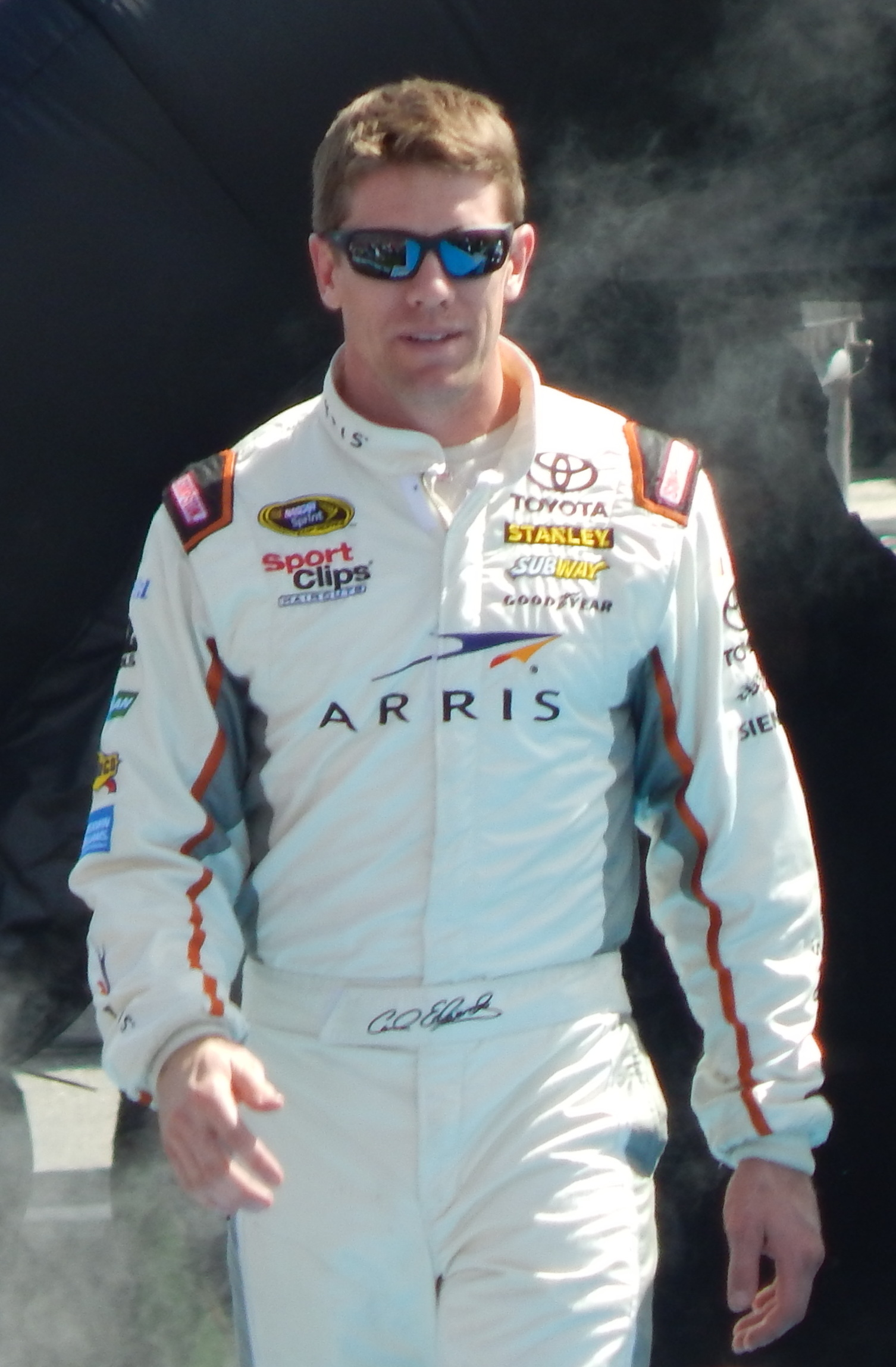
Carl Edwards came in second behind Keselowski by 445 points.

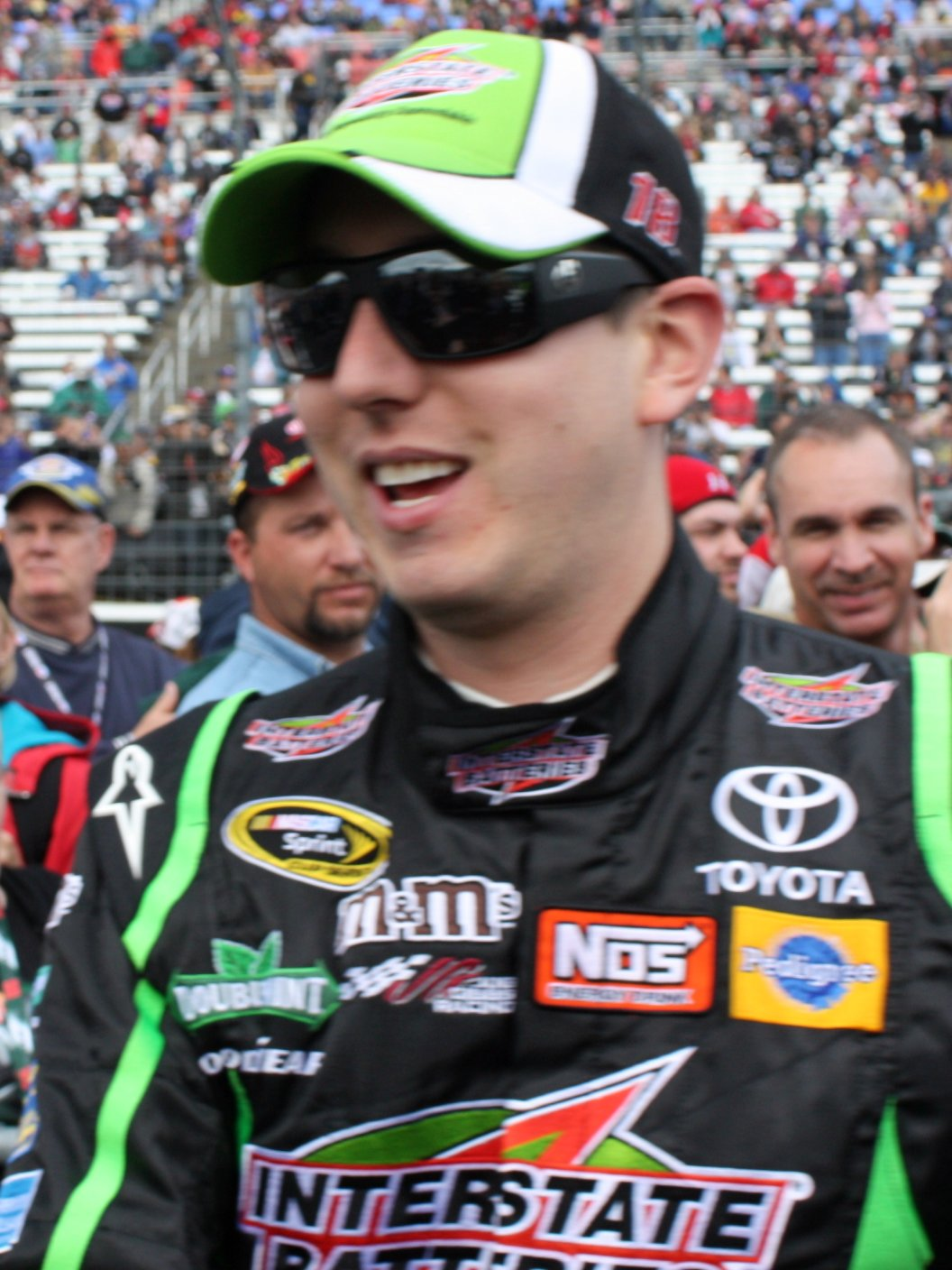
Kyle Busch finished third in the championship.

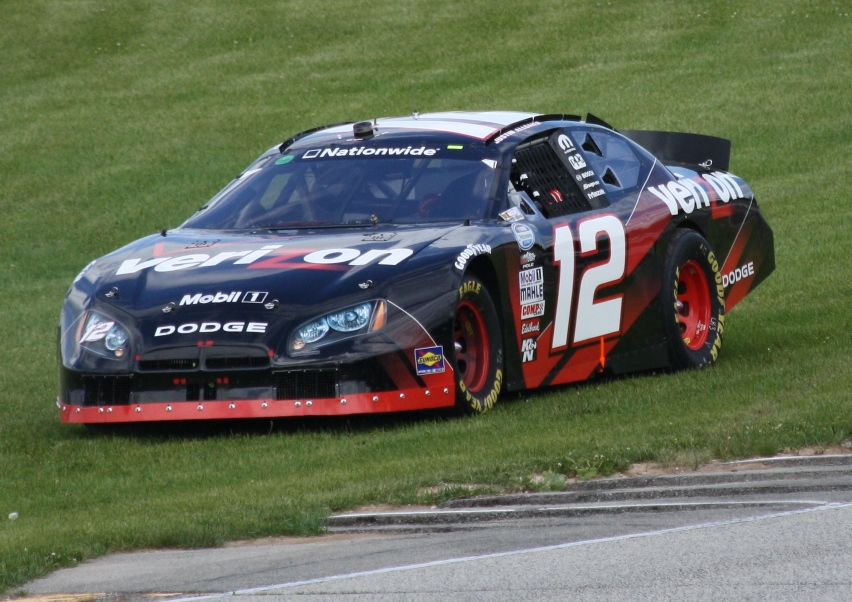
Justin Allgaier, who finished fourth in points driving the No. 12 Verizon car shown above, was the highest-finishing series regular in the standings.

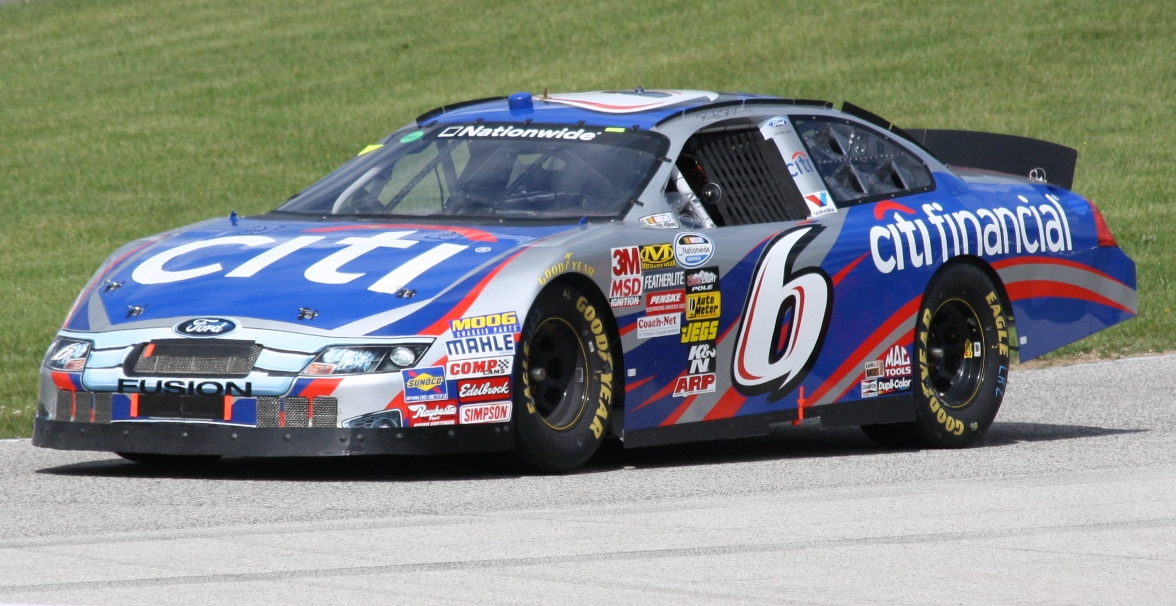
Ricky Stenhouse Jr. won the Rookie of the Year title.

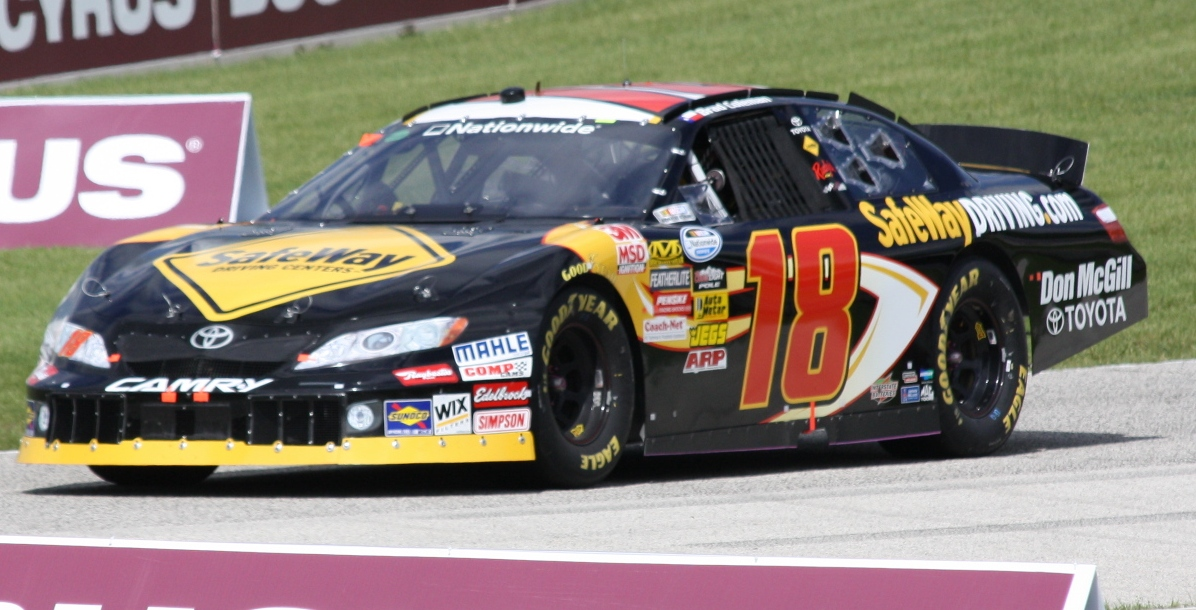
Toyota won the Manufacturers' championship.

The 2010 NASCAR Nationwide Series was the 29th season of the NASCAR Nationwide Series, the second-tier professional stock car racing series sanctioned by NASCAR in the United States. Beginning at Daytona International Speedway, the season included thirty-five races, which ended with the Ford 300 at Homestead–Miami Speedway. Brad Keselowski clinched the drivers' championship during the O'Reilly Auto Parts Challenge at Texas Motor Speedway, two races before the season finale at Homestead, while Joe Gibbs Racing won the owners' championship (for the No. 18 car, driven by Kyle Busch and Brad Coleman). Toyota won the manufacturers' championship with 240 points.

During the 2009 off-season, NASCAR announced few calendar changes, including moving the race at Memphis to Gateway due to the closure of Memphis. The short track of Milwaukee was also replaced with the road course at Road America, which hosted its first NASCAR race since a Cup race in 1956.

This was also the last season where Cup Series drivers could run for points in the series. NASCAR implemented this change after Cup drivers won the Busch/Nationwide championship over the series regulars for the fifth straight year in 2010.

== Schedule ==
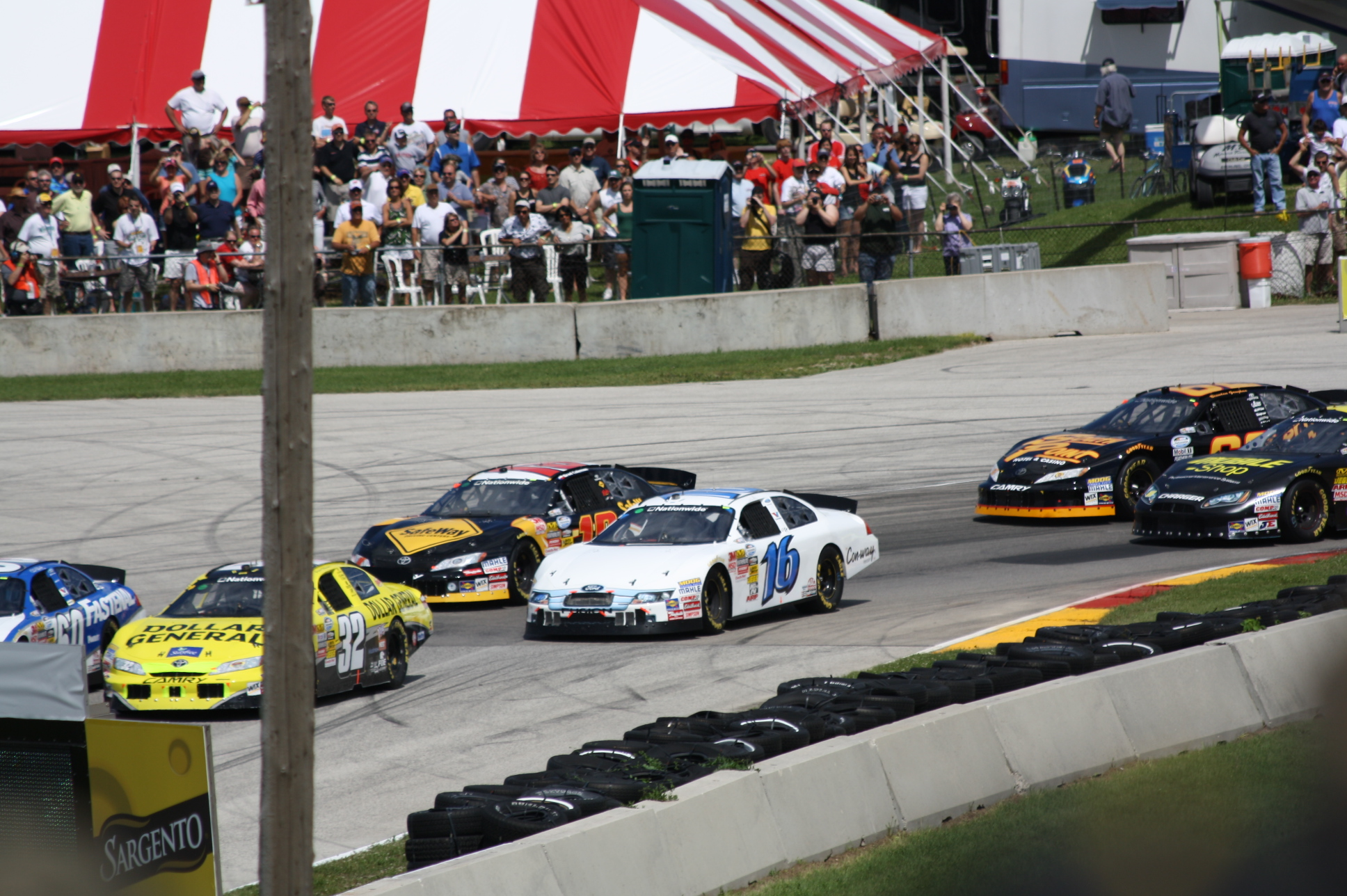
The Bucyrus 200 at Road America in June

Schedule changes: Phoenix and Nashville moved ahead of Texas in April. The spring race at Dover preceded the Charlotte weekends due to the extra week in May before Memorial Day. Because of the closure of the Memphis track, Gateway International Raceway in Madison, Illinois, also hosted a second race in October. Milwaukee was dropped from the schedule due to issues with the promoters, as the Wisconsin State Fair was attempting to hire a new promoter following the previous promoter's sanctioning fee nonpayment. That date went to Road America.

2010 Nationwide Series schedule
Round	Date	Race	Site	Winner
1	February 13	DRIVE4COPD 300	Daytona International Speedway	Tony Stewart
2	February 20	Stater Bros. 300	Auto Club Speedway	Kyle Busch
3	February 27	Sam's Town 300	Las Vegas Motor Speedway	Kevin Harvick
4	March 20	Scotts Turf Builder 300	Bristol Motor Speedway	Justin Allgaier
5	April 3	Nashville 300	Nashville Superspeedway	Kevin Harvick
6	April 9	Bashas' Supermarkets 200	Phoenix International Raceway	Kyle Busch
7	April 19	O'Reilly Auto Parts 300	Texas Motor Speedway	Kyle Busch
8	April 25	Aaron's 312	Talladega Superspeedway	Brad Keselowski
9	April 30	BUBBA Burger 250	Richmond International Raceway	Brad Keselowski
10	May 7	Royal Purple 200 presented by O'Reilly Auto Parts	Darlington Raceway	Denny Hamlin
11	May 15	Heluva Good! 200	Dover International Speedway	Kyle Busch
12	May 29	TECH-NET Auto Service 300 powered by Carquest	Charlotte Motor Speedway	Kyle Busch
13	June 5	Federated Auto Parts 300	Nashville Superspeedway	Brad Keselowski
14	June 12	Meijer 300	Kentucky Speedway	Joey Logano
15	June 19	Bucyrus 200 presented by Menards	Road America	Carl Edwards
16	June 26	New England 200	New Hampshire Motor Speedway	Kyle Busch
17	July 2	Subway Jalapeño 250 powered by Coca-Cola ♣	Daytona International Speedway	Dale Earnhardt Jr.
18	July 9	Dollar General 300	Chicagoland Speedway	Kyle Busch
19	July 17	Missouri-Illinois Dodge Dealers 250	Gateway Motorsports Park	Carl Edwards
20	July 24	Kroger 200	O'Reilly Raceway Park	Kyle Busch
21	July 31	U.S. Cellular 250	Iowa Speedway	Kyle Busch
22	August 7	Zippo 200 at The Glen	Watkins Glen International	Marcos Ambrose
23	August 14	Carfax 250 ♣	Michigan International Speedway	Brad Keselowski
24	August 20	Food City 250	Bristol Motor Speedway	Kyle Busch
25	August 29	NAPA Pieces d'Auto 200 presentee par Dodge	Circuit Gilles Villeneuve	Boris Said
26	September 4	Degree V12 300	Atlanta Motor Speedway	Jamie McMurray
27	September 10	Virginia 529 College Savings 250 ♣	Richmond International Raceway	Kevin Harvick
28	September 25	Dover 200	Dover International Speedway	Kyle Busch
29	October 2	Kansas Lottery 300	Kansas Speedway	Joey Logano
30	October 9	CampingWorld.com 300	Auto Club Speedway	Kyle Busch
31	October 15	Dollar General 300 ♣	Charlotte Motor Speedway	Brad Keselowski
32	October 23	5-Hour Energy 250	Gateway Motorsports Park	Brad Keselowski
33	November 6	O'Reilly Auto Parts Challenge	Texas Motor Speedway	Carl Edwards
34	November 13	WYPALL* 200 powered by Kimberly-Clark Professional	Phoenix International Raceway	Carl Edwards
35	November 20	Ford 300	Homestead–Miami Speedway	Kyle Busch

♣ – This race was run using the new Nationwide Series Car of Tomorrow.

== Teams and drivers ==
=== Complete schedule ===
Manufacturer	Team	No.	Driver	Crew chief
Chevrolet	Day Enterprise Racing	05	Jeff Green 1	Newt Moore
Chevrolet	Day Enterprise Racing	05	Willie Allen 22	Newt Moore
Chevrolet	Day Enterprise Racing	05	Victor Gonzalez Jr. 4	Newt Moore
Chevrolet	Day Enterprise Racing	05	David Starr 7	Newt Moore
Chevrolet	Day Enterprise Racing	05	Blake Koch 1	Newt Moore
Chevrolet	JD Motorsports	01	Mike Wallace	Patrick Magee 34; Randy Hood 1
Chevrolet	JR Motorsports	7	Danica Patrick (R) 13	Tony Eury Jr. 34; Jim Long 1
Chevrolet	JR Motorsports	7	Scott Wimmer 2	Tony Eury Jr. 34; Jim Long 1
Chevrolet	JR Motorsports	7	Landon Cassill 3	Tony Eury Jr. 34; Jim Long 1
Chevrolet	JR Motorsports	7	Steve Arpin 5	Tony Eury Jr. 34; Jim Long 1
Chevrolet	JR Motorsports	7	Josh Wise 8	Tony Eury Jr. 34; Jim Long 1
Chevrolet	JR Motorsports	7	J. R. Fitzpatrick 3	Tony Eury Jr. 34; Jim Long 1
Chevrolet	JR Motorsports	7	Aric Almirola 1	Tony Eury Jr. 34; Jim Long 1
Chevrolet	JR Motorsports	88	Dale Earnhardt Jr. 2	Tony Eury Sr.
Chevrolet	JR Motorsports	88	Kelly Bires 5	Tony Eury Sr.
Chevrolet	JR Motorsports	88	Jamie McMurray 8	Tony Eury Sr.
Chevrolet	JR Motorsports	88	Coleman Pressley 2	Tony Eury Sr.
Chevrolet	JR Motorsports	88	Ron Fellows 3	Tony Eury Sr.
Chevrolet	JR Motorsports	88	Elliott Sadler 4	Tony Eury Sr.
Chevrolet	JR Motorsports	88	Greg Sacks 1	Tony Eury Sr.
Chevrolet	JR Motorsports	88	Steve Arpin 2	Tony Eury Sr.
Chevrolet	JR Motorsports	88	Aric Almirola 7	Tony Eury Sr.
Chevrolet	JR Motorsports	88	Josh Wise 1	Tony Eury Sr.
Chevrolet	Key Motorsports	40	Mike Bliss 31	Gary Showalter
Chevrolet	Key Motorsports	40	Jeff Green 4	Gary Showalter
Chevrolet	Kevin Harvick, Inc.	33	Kevin Harvick 28	Ernie Cope
Chevrolet	Kevin Harvick, Inc.	33	Mike Bliss 3	Ernie Cope
Chevrolet	Kevin Harvick, Inc.	33	Ron Hornaday Jr. 2	Ernie Cope
Chevrolet	Kevin Harvick, Inc.	33	Elliott Sadler 1	Ernie Cope
Chevrolet	Kevin Harvick, Inc.	33	Max Papis 1	Ernie Cope
Chevrolet	ML Motorsports	70	Shelby Howard 22	Chris Rice
Chevrolet	ML Motorsports; Jay Robinson Racing	70	Mark Green 13	Curtis Aldridge 12; Skip Eyler 1
Chevrolet	NEMCO Motorsports	87	Joe Nemechek 32	Mike Boerschinger
Chevrolet	NEMCO Motorsports	87	Jarit Johnson 1	Mike Boerschinger
Chevrolet	NEMCO Motorsports	87	Antonio Pérez 1	Mike Boerschinger
Chevrolet	NEMCO Motorsports	87	Paulie Harraka 1	Mike Boerschinger
Chevrolet	R3 Motorsports	23	Robert Richardson Jr. 23	John Quinn 7 Steve Plattenberger 25; Walter Giles 1 Jeff Kirkendall 1
Chevrolet	R3 Motorsports	23	Coleman Pressley 5	John Quinn 7 Steve Plattenberger 25; Walter Giles 1 Jeff Kirkendall 1
Chevrolet	R3 Motorsports	23	Johnny Sauter 1	John Quinn 7 Steve Plattenberger 25; Walter Giles 1 Jeff Kirkendall 1
Chevrolet	R3 Motorsports	23	Alex Kennedy 4	John Quinn 7 Steve Plattenberger 25; Walter Giles 1 Jeff Kirkendall 1
Chevrolet	R3 Motorsports	23	Marc Davis 1	John Quinn 7 Steve Plattenberger 25; Walter Giles 1 Jeff Kirkendall 1
Chevrolet	R3 Motorsports	23	Peyton Sellers 1	John Quinn 7 Steve Plattenberger 25; Walter Giles 1 Jeff Kirkendall 1
Chevrolet	Richard Childress Racing	21	John Wes Townley 5	Dan Deeringhoff 17; Gere Kennon Jr. 5
Chevrolet	Richard Childress Racing	21	Clint Bowyer 13	Dan Deeringhoff 17; Gere Kennon Jr. 5
Chevrolet	Richard Childress Racing	21	Scott Riggs 2	Dan Deeringhoff 17; Gere Kennon Jr. 5
Chevrolet	Richard Childress Racing	21	Tim George Jr. 1	Dan Deeringhoff 17; Gere Kennon Jr. 5
Chevrolet	Richard Childress Racing	21	Austin Dillon 1	Dan Deeringhoff 17; Gere Kennon Jr. 5
Chevrolet	Faith Motorsports	21	Morgan Shepherd 13	Patrick Bryant
Chevrolet	Tri-Star Motorsports	34	Tony Raines 34	Scott Eggelston 25; Dave Fuge 10
Chevrolet	Tri-Star Motorsports	34	Charles Lewandoski 1	Scott Eggelston 25; Dave Fuge 10
Chevrolet	Tri-Star Motorsports	35	Jason Keller 30	Bryan Berry
Chevrolet	Tri-Star Motorsports	35	Tony Ave 3	Bryan Berry
Chevrolet	Tri-Star Motorsports	35	Antonio Pérez 1	Bryan Berry
Chevrolet	Tri-Star Motorsports	35	Tony Raines 1	Bryan Berry
Dodge	Penske Racing	12	Justin Allgaier	Chad Walter
Dodge	Penske Racing	22	Brad Keselowski	Paul Wolfe
Dodge	Penske Racing	26	Parker Kligerman 4	Chris Carrier
Dodge	Penske Racing	26	Sam Hornish Jr. 1	Chris Carrier
Dodge	K-Automotive Motorsports	26	Brian Keselowski 28	Todd Gault 2 Dave Fuge 14; David Ingram Jr. 9 Wesley Gonder 6
Dodge	K-Automotive Motorsports	26	Johnny Chapman 1	Todd Gault 2 Dave Fuge 14; David Ingram Jr. 9 Wesley Gonder 6
Dodge	K-Automotive Motorsports	26	Dennis Setzer 1	Todd Gault 2 Dave Fuge 14; David Ingram Jr. 9 Wesley Gonder 6
Dodge	Baker Curb Racing	27	Andrew Ranger 1	Gary Grossenbacher 2 Ricky Viers 12; Jeff White 1 Steve Kuykendall 1 Jonathan Reese 18
Ford	Baker Curb Racing	27	Greg Biffle 10	Gary Grossenbacher 2 Ricky Viers 12; Jeff White 1 Steve Kuykendall 1 Jonathan Reese 18
Ford	Baker Curb Racing	27	Johnny Sauter 2	Gary Grossenbacher 2 Ricky Viers 12; Jeff White 1 Steve Kuykendall 1 Jonathan Reese 18
Ford	Baker Curb Racing	27	Scott Wimmer 3	Gary Grossenbacher 2 Ricky Viers 12; Jeff White 1 Steve Kuykendall 1 Jonathan Reese 18
Ford	Baker Curb Racing	27	Owen Kelly 1	Gary Grossenbacher 2 Ricky Viers 12; Jeff White 1 Steve Kuykendall 1 Jonathan Reese 18
Ford	Baker Curb Racing	27	Justin Lofton 2	Gary Grossenbacher 2 Ricky Viers 12; Jeff White 1 Steve Kuykendall 1 Jonathan Reese 18
Ford	Baker Curb Racing	27	Jennifer Jo Cobb 1	Gary Grossenbacher 2 Ricky Viers 12; Jeff White 1 Steve Kuykendall 1 Jonathan Reese 18
Ford	Baker Curb Racing	27	Kelly Bires 1	Gary Grossenbacher 2 Ricky Viers 12; Jeff White 1 Steve Kuykendall 1 Jonathan Reese 18
Ford	Baker Curb Racing	27	Drew Herring 4	Gary Grossenbacher 2 Ricky Viers 12; Jeff White 1 Steve Kuykendall 1 Jonathan Reese 18
Ford	Baker Curb Racing	27	Nelson Piquet Jr. 1	Gary Grossenbacher 2 Ricky Viers 12; Jeff White 1 Steve Kuykendall 1 Jonathan Reese 18
Ford	Baker Curb Racing	27	Josh Wise 1	Gary Grossenbacher 2 Ricky Viers 12; Jeff White 1 Steve Kuykendall 1 Jonathan Reese 18
Ford	Baker Curb Racing	27	Danny O'Quinn Jr. 1	Gary Grossenbacher 2 Ricky Viers 12; Jeff White 1 Steve Kuykendall 1 Jonathan Reese 18
Ford	Baker Curb Racing	27	Brad Baker 2	Gary Grossenbacher 2 Ricky Viers 12; Jeff White 1 Steve Kuykendall 1 Jonathan Reese 18
Ford	Baker Curb Racing	27	Hermie Sadler 2	Gary Grossenbacher 2 Ricky Viers 12; Jeff White 1 Steve Kuykendall 1 Jonathan Reese 18
Ford	Baker Curb Racing	27	Alex Kennedy 2	Gary Grossenbacher 2 Ricky Viers 12; Jeff White 1 Steve Kuykendall 1 Jonathan Reese 18
Ford	Baker Curb Racing	27	Chase Mattioli 1	Gary Grossenbacher 2 Ricky Viers 12; Jeff White 1 Steve Kuykendall 1 Jonathan Reese 18
Ford	Roush Fenway Racing	6	Ricky Stenhouse Jr. (R) 33	Ben Leslie 6 Mike Kelley 29
Ford	Roush Fenway Racing	6	Brian Ickler 1	Ben Leslie 6 Mike Kelley 29
Ford	Roush Fenway Racing	6	Billy Johnson 1	Ben Leslie 6 Mike Kelley 29
Ford	Roush Fenway Racing	16	Colin Braun (R) 24	Eddie Pardue 15; Ricky Viers 14; Chad Norris 6
Ford	Roush Fenway Racing	16	Matt Kenseth 3	Eddie Pardue 15; Ricky Viers 14; Chad Norris 6
Ford	Roush Fenway Racing	16	Brian Ickler 4	Eddie Pardue 15; Ricky Viers 14; Chad Norris 6
Ford	Roush Fenway Racing	16	Erik Darnell 3	Eddie Pardue 15; Ricky Viers 14; Chad Norris 6
Ford	Roush Fenway Racing	16	Trevor Bayne 1	Eddie Pardue 15; Ricky Viers 14; Chad Norris 6
Ford	Roush Fenway Racing	60	Carl Edwards	Drew Blickensderfer 29; Mike Beam 6
Ford	Roush Fenway Racing	98	Paul Menard	Matt Puccia
Ford	Team Rensi Motorsports	24	Eric McClure 34	Chris Wright
Ford	Team Rensi Motorsports	24	D. J. Kennington 1	Chris Wright
Toyota	Diamond-Waltrip Racing	99	Trevor Bayne 28	Jerry Baxter
Toyota	Diamond-Waltrip Racing	99	Ryan Truex 4	Jerry Baxter
Toyota	Diamond-Waltrip Racing	99	Martin Truex Jr. 3	Jerry Baxter
Toyota	Germain Racing	15	Michael Annett	Ryan Fugle
Toyota	Joe Gibbs Racing	18	Kyle Busch 29	Jason Ratcliff
Toyota	Joe Gibbs Racing	18	Brad Coleman 6	Jason Ratcliff
Toyota	Joe Gibbs Racing	20	Joey Logano 25	Kevin Kidd
Toyota	Joe Gibbs Racing	20	Denny Hamlin 4	Kevin Kidd
Toyota	Joe Gibbs Racing	20	Matt DiBenedetto 6	Kevin Kidd
Toyota	Rusty Wallace Racing	62	Brendan Gaughan	Wes Ward 2 Brad Parrott 24; Larry Carter 1 Jason Overstreet 7
Toyota	Rusty Wallace Racing	66	Steve Wallace	Scott McDougall
Dodge Ford	MacDonald Motorsports	81	Michael McDowell	Patrick Donahue
Ford Toyota	RAB Racing	09	Scott Riggs 5	Ben Gable
Ford Toyota	RAB Racing	09	Jason Bowles 1	Ben Gable
Ford Toyota	RAB Racing	09	Chad McCumbee 4	Ben Gable
Ford Toyota	RAB Racing	09	Patrick Sheltra 1	Ben Gable
Ford Toyota	RAB Racing	09	Hermie Sadler 1	Ben Gable
Ford Toyota	RAB Racing	09	Sean Caisse 3	Robby Benton 12; Scott Zipadelli 11
Ford Toyota	RAB Racing	09	Robb Brent 1	Robby Benton 12; Scott Zipadelli 11
Ford Toyota	RAB Racing	09	Ken Schrader 1	Robby Benton 12; Scott Zipadelli 11
Ford Toyota	RAB Racing	09	Landon Cassill 3	Robby Benton 12; Scott Zipadelli 11
Ford Toyota	RAB Racing	09	Kevin Hamlin 1	Robby Benton 12; Scott Zipadelli 11
Ford Toyota	RAB Racing	09	John Wes Townley 4	Robby Benton 12; Scott Zipadelli 11
Ford Toyota	RAB Racing	09	Boris Said 2	Robby Benton 12; Scott Zipadelli 11
Ford Toyota	RAB Racing	09	Kelly Bires 1	Robby Benton 12; Scott Zipadelli 11
Ford Toyota	RAB Racing	09	Brian Scott (R) 7	Robby Benton 12; Scott Zipadelli 11
Toyota Chevrolet	Braun Racing 27; Turner Motorsports 8	10	Jason Leffler 8	Scott Zipadelli 2 Stewart Cooper 25; Tripp Bruce 3 Shannon Rursch 2 Jeff Stankiewicz 3
Toyota Chevrolet	Braun Racing 27; Turner Motorsports 8	10	David Reutimann 3	Scott Zipadelli 2 Stewart Cooper 25; Tripp Bruce 3 Shannon Rursch 2 Jeff Stankiewicz 3
Toyota Chevrolet	Braun Racing 27; Turner Motorsports 8	10	Chad Blount 1	Scott Zipadelli 2 Stewart Cooper 25; Tripp Bruce 3 Shannon Rursch 2 Jeff Stankiewicz 3
Toyota Chevrolet	Braun Racing 27; Turner Motorsports 8	10	Mikey Kile 1	Scott Zipadelli 2 Stewart Cooper 25; Tripp Bruce 3 Shannon Rursch 2 Jeff Stankiewicz 3
Toyota Chevrolet	Braun Racing 27; Turner Motorsports 8	10	Casey Mears 1	Scott Zipadelli 2 Stewart Cooper 25; Tripp Bruce 3 Shannon Rursch 2 Jeff Stankiewicz 3
Toyota Chevrolet	Braun Racing 27; Turner Motorsports 8	10	Reed Sorenson 1	Scott Zipadelli 2 Stewart Cooper 25; Tripp Bruce 3 Shannon Rursch 2 Jeff Stankiewicz 3
Toyota Chevrolet	Braun Racing 27; Turner Motorsports 8	10	Kelly Bires 1	Scott Zipadelli 2 Stewart Cooper 25; Tripp Bruce 3 Shannon Rursch 2 Jeff Stankiewicz 3
Toyota Chevrolet	Braun Racing 27; Turner Motorsports 8	10	Tayler Malsam 11	Scott Zipadelli 2 Stewart Cooper 25; Tripp Bruce 3 Shannon Rursch 2 Jeff Stankiewicz 3
Toyota Chevrolet	Braun Racing 27; Turner Motorsports 8	10	Derrick Griffin 1	Scott Zipadelli 2 Stewart Cooper 25; Tripp Bruce 3 Shannon Rursch 2 Jeff Stankiewicz 3
Toyota Chevrolet	Braun Racing 27; Turner Motorsports 8	10	Josh Wise 1	Scott Zipadelli 2 Stewart Cooper 25; Tripp Bruce 3 Shannon Rursch 2 Jeff Stankiewicz 3
Toyota Chevrolet	Braun Racing 27; Turner Motorsports 8	10	Ricky Carmichael 4	Scott Zipadelli 2 Stewart Cooper 25; Tripp Bruce 3 Shannon Rursch 2 Jeff Stankiewicz 3
Toyota Chevrolet	Braun Racing 27; Turner Motorsports 8	10	James Buescher (R) 1	Scott Zipadelli 2 Stewart Cooper 25; Tripp Bruce 3 Shannon Rursch 2 Jeff Stankiewicz 3
Toyota Chevrolet	Braun Racing 27; Turner Motorsports 8	10	Scott Wimmer 1	Scott Zipadelli 2 Stewart Cooper 25; Tripp Bruce 3 Shannon Rursch 2 Jeff Stankiewicz 3
Toyota Chevrolet	Braun Racing 27; Turner Motorsports 8	11	Brian Scott (R) 28	Billy Wilburn 19; Jeff Stankiewicz 14; Stewart Cooper 3
Toyota Chevrolet	Braun Racing 27; Turner Motorsports 8	11	James Buescher (R) 3	Billy Wilburn 19; Jeff Stankiewicz 14; Stewart Cooper 3
Toyota Chevrolet	Braun Racing 27; Turner Motorsports 8	11	David Reutimann 3	Billy Wilburn 19; Jeff Stankiewicz 14; Stewart Cooper 3
Toyota Chevrolet	Braun Racing 27; Turner Motorsports 8	11	Brad Sweet 1	Billy Wilburn 19; Jeff Stankiewicz 14; Stewart Cooper 3
Toyota Chevrolet	Braun Racing 27; Turner Motorsports 8	32	Brian Vickers 5	Trent Owens
Toyota Chevrolet	Braun Racing 27; Turner Motorsports 8	32	Reed Sorenson 27	Trent Owens
Toyota Chevrolet	Braun Racing 27; Turner Motorsports 8	32	Jacques Villeneuve 3	Trent Owens
Toyota Chevrolet	Braun Racing 27; Turner Motorsports 8	38	Kasey Kahne 8	Stewart Cooper 7 Scott Zipadelli 7 Tripp Bruce 3 Rich Lavallette 2 Eddie Pardue 16
Toyota Chevrolet	Braun Racing 27; Turner Motorsports 8	38	Jason Leffler 27	Stewart Cooper 7 Scott Zipadelli 7 Tripp Bruce 3 Rich Lavallette 2 Eddie Pardue 16
Toyota Chevrolet	Jay Robinson Racing	28	Kenny Wallace	Jay Robinson 25; Curtis Aldridge 2 Chris Diederich 8

=== Limited schedule ===
Manufacturer	Team	No.	Driver	Crew chief	Rounds
Chevrolet	Blanton Motorsports	48	Johnny Sauter	Marc Browning	1
Chevrolet	Bob Schacht Motorsports	5	Bobby Gerhart	Bob Schacht	1
Chevrolet	Bob Schacht Motorsports	75	Bobby Gerhart	Bob Schacht	1
Chevrolet	Corrie Stott Racing	02	Danny Efland	Corrie Stott	1
Chevrolet	Corrie Stott Racing	02	Andy Ponstein	Corrie Stott	4
Chevrolet	Harr Racing	02	Daryl Harr	Donnie Richeson	3
Chevrolet	Danny Efland Racing	07	Danny Efland	John Anderson 3 Micah Horton 7	10
Chevrolet	D'Hondt Humphrey Motorsports	91	Stephen Leicht	Joe Lax 7 Matthew Sauer 18	2
Chevrolet	D'Hondt Humphrey Motorsports	91	David Gilliland	Joe Lax 7 Matthew Sauer 18	16
Chevrolet	D'Hondt Humphrey Motorsports	91	Chase Miller	Joe Lax 7 Matthew Sauer 18	8
Chevrolet	Faith Motorsports	89	Morgan Shepherd	Gary Ravan 27; Leon Bishop 2 Nick Cole 3 Stephen Nestroyl Jr. 1	21
Chevrolet	Faith Motorsports	89	Johnny Chapman	Gary Ravan 27; Leon Bishop 2 Nick Cole 3 Stephen Nestroyl Jr. 1	11
Chevrolet	Faith Motorsports	89	Brett Rowe	Gary Ravan 27; Leon Bishop 2 Nick Cole 3 Stephen Nestroyl Jr. 1	2
Chevrolet	Fleur-de-lis Motorsports	68	Carl Long	Morris Van Vleet	4
Chevrolet	JD Motorsports	0	Jeremy Clements	Richard Harriman	1
Chevrolet	JD Motorsports	0	Chrissy Wallace	Jacob Owings	1
Chevrolet	JD Motorsports	0	Brad Teague	Ryan Bell	1
Chevrolet	JD Motorsports	04	Brad Teague	Randy Hood	2
Chevrolet	JD Motorsports	04	Kevin Lepage	Randy Hood	1
Chevrolet	JD Motorsports; Jeremy Clements Racing	04	Jeremy Clements	Randy Hood 2 Patrick Magee 1 Jacob Owings 2 Richard Harriman 7 Ricky Pearson 10	22
Chevrolet	Kevin Harvick, Inc.	4	Tony Stewart	Butch Hylton	1
Chevrolet	Jay Robinson Racing	49	Mark Green	Curtis Aldridge 14; Skip Eyler 8	22
Chevrolet	Jay Robinson Racing	49	David Green	Mark Fordham	1
Chevrolet	McCurley Racing	51	Stephan McCurley	Michael McCurley	2
Chevrolet	NEMCO Motorsports	97	Jeff Fuller	Mark Tutor	1
Chevrolet	NEMCO Motorsports	97	Joe Nemechek	Mark Tutor	1
Chevrolet	Phoenix Racing	1	James Buescher (R)	Marc Reno 13; George Allison 7 Nick Harrison 1	10
Chevrolet	Phoenix Racing	1	Ryan Newman	Marc Reno 13; George Allison 7 Nick Harrison 1	12
Chevrolet	Richard Childress Racing; JR Motorsports	3	Dale Earnhardt Jr.	Tony Eury Jr.	1
Chevrolet	Rick Ware Racing	31	Stanton Barrett	Paul Andrews 2 Gary Cogswell 4	4
Chevrolet	Rick Ware Racing	31	J. C. Stout	Paul Andrews 2 Gary Cogswell 4	1
Chevrolet	Rick Ware Racing	31	Kevin O'Connell	Paul Andrews 2 Gary Cogswell 4	1
Chevrolet	Rick Ware Racing	41	Chrissy Wallace	Dave Mitchell	1
Chevrolet	Rick Ware Racing	41	Stanton Barrett	Gary Cogswell 1 Sterling Loughlin 1	2
Chevrolet	Sellers Racing	25	Peyton Sellers	Marcus Richmond	2
Chevrolet	Team Kelley Racing	59	Kyle Kelley	Robert Rucker	3
Chevrolet	Tri-Star Motorsports	36	Kevin Hamlin	Dave Fuge 7 Leon Bishop 9	3
Chevrolet	Tri-Star Motorsports	36	Johnny Sauter	Dave Fuge 7 Leon Bishop 9	1
Chevrolet	Tri-Star Motorsports	36	Jeff Green	Dave Fuge 7 Leon Bishop 9	12
Chevrolet	Turner Motorsports	30	James Buescher (R)	Michael Shelton	1
Dodge	DF2 Motorsports	94	Carl Long	George Church	3
Dodge	K-Automotive Motorsports	92	Johnny Chapman	Ron Keselowski 2 David Ingram Jr. 5 Bob Keselowski 20; Aaron Kramer 2	4
Dodge	K-Automotive Motorsports	92	Dennis Setzer	Ron Keselowski 2 David Ingram Jr. 5 Bob Keselowski 20; Aaron Kramer 2	19 (Note: Dennis Setzer qualified the No. 92 car at Dover I (race #11), but was replaced in the race by Brian Keselowski after he failed to qualify in his own No. 26 car.)
Dodge	K-Automotive Motorsports	92	Brian Keselowski	Ron Keselowski 2 David Ingram Jr. 5 Bob Keselowski 20; Aaron Kramer 2	3
Dodge	K-Automotive Motorsports	92	Andy Ponstein	Ron Keselowski 2 David Ingram Jr. 5 Bob Keselowski 20; Aaron Kramer 2	3
Dodge	K-Automotive Motorsports	92	Dan Brode	Ron Keselowski 2 David Ingram Jr. 5 Bob Keselowski 20; Aaron Kramer 2	1
Dodge	K-Automotive Motorsports	96	Dennis Setzer	Bob Keselowski 5 Todd Gault 1 David Ingram Jr. 1	5
Dodge	K-Automotive Motorsports	96	Johnny Chapman	Bob Keselowski 5 Todd Gault 1 David Ingram Jr. 1	1
Dodge	MacDonald Motorsports	82	Matt Carter	Randy MacDonald 2 Wayne Carroll Jr. 4	2
Dodge	MacDonald Motorsports	82	Tomy Drissi	Randy MacDonald 2 Wayne Carroll Jr. 4	1
Dodge	MacDonald Motorsports	82	Chase Miller	Randy MacDonald 2 Wayne Carroll Jr. 4	3
Dodge	Stratus Racing Group, Inc.	73	Derrike Cope	Rick Markle	19
Dodge	Stratus Racing Group, Inc.	73	Johnny Chapman	Rick Markle	1
Dodge	Team 42 Racing	42	Parker Kligerman	Chris Carrier 11; Marc Browning 2	11
Dodge	Team 42 Racing	42	David Gilliland	Chris Carrier 11; Marc Browning 2	1
Dodge	Team 42 Racing	42	Brandon McReynolds	Chris Carrier 11; Marc Browning 2	1
Ford	Baker Curb Racing	37	Kevin Swindell	Ronnie Griffin	2
Ford	Baker Curb Racing	37	Josh Wise	Ronnie Griffin	1
Ford	Go Green Racing	39	Jason Bowles	Leo Desrocher Jr.	1
Ford	Go Green Racing	39	Danny O'Quinn Jr.	Leo Desrocher Jr.	1
Ford	Go Green Racing	39	Charles Lewandoski	Leo Desrocher Jr.	1
Ford	Go Green Racing	39	Sean Caisse	Leo Desrocher Jr.	3
Ford	Go Green Racing	39	Alan Tardiff	Leo Desrocher Jr.	1
Ford	Ray Hackett Racing	76	Ryan Hackett	Joe Lax	1
Ford	Roush Fenway Racing	17	Trevor Bayne	Ricky Viers	6
Ford	2nd Chance Motorsports	79	Tim Andrews	Paul Andrews	6
Ford	Specialty Racing	61	Josh Wise	Scott Harris 14; Nick Cole 2	14
Ford	Specialty Racing	61	Matt Carter	Scott Harris 14; Nick Cole 2	2
Ford	Specialty Racing	61	Chase Miller	Ben Gitlin	1
Ford	Specialty Racing	61	J. J. Yeley	David Nelson	1
Ford	Specialty Racing	61	Pierre Bourque	David Nelson	1
Ford	Team Rensi Motorsports	25	Kelly Bires	Travis Young	2
Toyota	Diamond-Waltrip Racing	00	Ryan Truex	Mike Greci	3
Toyota	Diamond-Waltrip Racing	00	Patrick Carpentier	Mike Greci	1
Toyota	Diamond-Waltrip Racing	00	Martin Truex Jr.	Mike Greci	3
Toyota	JTG Daugherty Racing	47	Marcos Ambrose	Frank Kerr	2
Toyota	Red Bull Racing	84	Cole Whitt	Randy Cox	2
Toyota	Red Horse Racing	71	Justin Lofton	Mark Rette	1
Toyota	Robby Gordon Motorsports	07	Robby Gordon	Samuel Stanley	1
Chevrolet Dodge	Herd Racing; Shepherd Racing Ventures	75	Brett Rowe	Chad Beahr	2
Chevrolet Dodge	Herd Racing; Shepherd Racing Ventures	75	Johnny Chapman	Nick Cole	1
Chevrolet Dodge Ford	Baker Curb Racing	43	Scott Lagasse Jr.	Jeff White 7 Scott Lagasse Sr. 8	14
Chevrolet Dodge Ford	Baker Curb Racing	43	Kevin O'Connell	Jeff White 7 Scott Lagasse Sr. 8	1
Chevrolet Dodge Ford	Baker Curb Racing	43	Brad Baker	Wayne Grubb	4
Chevrolet Dodge Ford	Baker Curb Racing	43	Johnny Chapman	Wayne Grubb	1
Chevrolet Dodge Ford	Baker Curb Racing	43	Kevin Swindell	Wayne Grubb	1
Chevrolet Dodge Ford	Baker Curb Racing	43	Chase Austin	Wayne Grubb	1
Chevrolet Dodge Ford	Baker Curb Racing	43	Drew Herring	Wayne Grubb	1
Chevrolet Dodge Ford	Baker Curb Racing	43	Justin Marks	Wayne Grubb	1
Chevrolet Dodge Ford	Baker Curb Racing	43	Kevin Hamlin	Wayne Grubb	1
Chevrolet Dodge Ford	Baker Curb Racing	43	Josh Wise	D. J. Copp	1
Chevrolet Ford	Means Racing	52	Donnie Neuenberger	Zach Bruenger 5 Tim Brown 14	3
Chevrolet Ford	Means Racing	52	Chris Lawson	Zach Bruenger 5 Tim Brown 14	6
Chevrolet Ford	Means Racing	52	Tim Schendel	Zach Bruenger 5 Tim Brown 14	3
Chevrolet Ford	Means Racing	52	Kevin Hamlin	Zach Bruenger 5 Tim Brown 14	1
Chevrolet Ford	Means Racing	52	Kenny Hendrick	Zach Bruenger 5 Tim Brown 14	1
Chevrolet Ford	Means Racing	52	Joey Scarallo	Zach Bruenger 5 Tim Brown 14	1
Chevrolet Ford	Means Racing	52	Kevin Lepage	Zach Bruenger 5 Tim Brown 14	5
Chevrolet Toyota	D'Hondt Humphrey Motorsports	90	Danny O'Quinn Jr.	Bruce Schlicker	24
Chevrolet Toyota	D'Hondt Humphrey Motorsports	90	Chase Miller	Bruce Schlicker	2
Chevrolet Toyota	D'Hondt Humphrey Motorsports	90	Patrick Long	Bruce Schlicker	1
Chevrolet Toyota	Mac Hill Motorsports	56	Kevin Lepage	Todd Myers	25
Chevrolet Toyota	Mac Hill Motorsports	56	Joey Scarallo	Todd Myers	1
Dodge Ford	Borneman Motorsports	83	Johnny Borneman III	Kevin Cram	8
Dodge Ford	Jennifer Jo Cobb Racing	13	Jennifer Jo Cobb	Steve Kuykendall	2
Dodge Ford	Jennifer Jo Cobb Racing	13	Mike Harmon	Steve Kuykendall	1

== Nationwide Car of Tomorrow ==
NASCAR announced in October 2009 that the Nationwide Series' Car of Tomorrow will make its debut in 2010 in four races. Those races were the July race at Daytona International Speedway, the August race at Michigan International Speedway, the September race at Richmond International Raceway, and the October race at Charlotte Motor Speedway

The new cars featured the new safety improvements of the Sprint Cup Car of Tomorrow including a larger greenhouse area, however they included a molded front splitter and a classic style spoiler (instead of the Sprint Cup's wing). The new cars also are designed to look more like their street counterparts than the Sprint Cup Car of Tomorrow. Chevrolet continued to run the Impala and Toyota continued to run the Camry nameplates, however Dodge ran the Challenger and Ford will run the Mustang.

== TV and radio ==
=== United States ===
ESPN held the broadcast rights for Nationwide Series races. Most events was broadcast on ESPN or ESPN2 in the United States with three races airing on ABC. Practice and qualifying sessions was broadcast on SPEED or ESPN2 depending on their agreements.

=== International ===
The Nationwide Series was broadcast in Australia on Network Ten's Digital sports channel, ONE, in Standard and High Definition. Broadcasts included both full races, typically on a Sunday morning, local time, and 1-hour highlights packages several times during the week. Live flag-to-flag coverage of the races in shown on SPEED for Latin America.

== 2010 season races ==
=== Drive4COPD 300 ===
The DRIVE4COPD 300 was held February 13 at Daytona International Speedway. Tony Stewart won the race.

Top ten finishers
Pos.	Car #	Driver	Make	Team
1	4	Tony Stewart	Chevrolet	Kevin Harvick, Inc.
2	60	Carl Edwards	Ford	Roush Fenway Racing
3	33	Kevin Harvick	Chevrolet	Kevin Harvick, Inc.
4	12	Justin Allgaier	Dodge	Penske Championship Racing
5	32	Brian Vickers	Toyota	Braun Racing
6	98	Paul Menard	Ford	Roush Fenway Racing
7	20	Joey Logano	Toyota	Joe Gibbs Racing
8	1	James Buescher	Chevrolet	Phoenix Racing
9	38	Kasey Kahne	Toyota	Braun Racing
10	66	Steve Wallace	Toyota	Rusty Wallace Racing
Official race results

Did not qualify: Jeremy Clements (#0), Kevin Lepage (#56), Johnny Borneman III (#83), Brett Rowe (#75), Derrike Cope (#73), Johnny Chapman (#92), Jason Keller (#35), Shelby Howard (#70).

- Parker Kligerman (#42), Mark Green (#49), Donnie Neuenberger (#52), Dennis Setzer (#96), Jeff Fuller (#97) all withdrew after qualifying was rained out.

=== Stater Bros. 300 ===
The Stater Bros. 300 was held February 20 at Auto Club Speedway. Joey Logano took the pole but Kyle Busch won the race.

Top ten finishers
Pos.	Car #	Driver	Make	Team
1	18	Kyle Busch	Toyota	Joe Gibbs Racing
2	27	Greg Biffle	Ford	Baker Curb Racing
3	22	Brad Keselowski	Dodge	Penske Championship Racing
4	60	Carl Edwards	Ford	Roush Fenway Racing
5	20	Joey Logano	Toyota	Joe Gibbs Racing
6	66	Steve Wallace	Toyota	Rusty Wallace Racing
7	88	Kelly Bires	Chevrolet	JR Motorsports
8	32	Brian Vickers	Toyota	Braun Racing
9	12	Justin Allgaier	Dodge	Penske Championship Racing
10	11	Brian Scott	Toyota	Braun Racing
Official race results

Did not qualify: Morgan Shepherd (#89), Danny O'Quinn Jr. (#90), Stephen Leicht (#91), Johnny Chapman (#92), Andy Ponstein (#02), Jeremy Clements (#04).

=== Sam's Town 300 ===
The Sam's Town 300 was held February 27 at Las Vegas Motor Speedway. Brad Keselowski took the pole but Kevin Harvick won the race.

Top ten finishers
Pos.	Car #	Driver	Make	Team
1	33	Kevin Harvick	Chevrolet	Kevin Harvick, Inc.
2	20	Denny Hamlin	Toyota	Joe Gibbs Racing
3	60	Carl Edwards	Ford	Roush Fenway Racing
4	22	Brad Keselowski	Dodge	Penske Championship Racing
5	32	Brian Vickers	Toyota	Braun Racing
6	99	Trevor Bayne	Toyota	Diamond-Waltrip Racing
7	12	Justin Allgaier	Dodge	Penske Championship Racing
8	98	Paul Menard	Ford	Roush Fenway Racing
9	27	Greg Biffle	Ford	Baker Curb Racing
10	66	Steve Wallace	Toyota	Rusty Wallace Racing
Official race results

Did not qualify: Jason Keller (#35), Johnny Chapman (#92), Derrike Cope (#73), Jeremy Clements (#04), Stephen Leicht (#91), Johnny Borneman III (#83), Andy Ponstein (#02), Morgan Shepherd (#89).

=== Scotts Turf Builder 300 ===
The Scotts Turf Builder 300 was held March 20 at Bristol Motor Speedway. Brad Keselowski took the pole but Justin Allgaier won the race.

Top ten finishers
Pos.	Car #	Driver	Make	Team
1	12	Justin Allgaier	Dodge	Penske Championship Racing
2	22	Brad Keselowski	Dodge	Penske Championship Racing
3	18	Kyle Busch	Toyota	Joe Gibbs Racing
4	60	Carl Edwards	Ford	Roush Fenway Racing
5	33	Kevin Harvick	Chevrolet	Kevin Harvick, Inc.
6	27	Greg Biffle	Ford	Baker Curb Racing
7	32	Reed Sorenson	Toyota	Braun Racing
8	40	Mike Bliss	Chevrolet	Key Motorsports
9	10	Jason Leffler	Toyota	Braun Racing
10	7	Scott Wimmer	Chevrolet	JR Motorsports
Official race results

Did not qualify: Dennis Setzer (#96), Mark Green (#49), Scott Riggs (#09), Jason Bowles (#39), Brad Teague (#04), Parker Kligerman (#42), Chris Lawson (#52).

=== Nashville 300 ===
The Nashville 300 was held April 3 at Nashville Superspeedway. Joey Logano took the pole but Kevin Harvick won the race.

Top ten finishers
Pos.	Car #	Driver	Make	Team
1	33	Kevin Harvick	Chevrolet	Kevin Harvick, Inc.
2	32	Reed Sorenson	Toyota	Braun Racing
3	18	Kyle Busch	Toyota	Joe Gibbs Racing
4	12	Justin Allgaier	Dodge	Penske Championship Racing
5	22	Brad Keselowski	Dodge	Penske Championship Racing
6	60	Carl Edwards	Ford	Roush Fenway Racing
7	7	Scott Wimmer	Chevrolet	JR Motorsports
8	20	Joey Logano	Toyota	Joe Gibbs Racing
9	15	Michael Annett	Toyota	Germain Racing
10	62	Brendan Gaughan	Toyota	Rusty Wallace Racing
Official race results

Did not qualify: Chase Miller (#91), Dennis Setzer (#92), Tim Schendel (#52), Andy Ponstein (#02) Brett Rowe (#75).

=== Bashas' Supermarkets 200 ===
The Bashas' Supermarkets 200 was held April 9 at Phoenix International Raceway. Carl Edwards took the pole but Kyle Busch won the race.

Top ten finishers
Pos.	Car #	Driver	Make	Team
1	18	Kyle Busch	Toyota	Joe Gibbs Racing
2	33	Kevin Harvick	Chevrolet	Kevin Harvick, Inc.
3	22	Brad Keselowski	Dodge	Penske Championship Racing
4	62	Brendan Gaughan	Toyota	Rusty Wallace Racing
5	27	Greg Biffle	Ford	Baker Curb Racing
6	60	Carl Edwards	Ford	Roush Fenway Racing
7	98	Paul Menard	Ford	Roush Fenway Racing
8	43	Scott Lagasse Jr.	Ford	Baker Curb Racing
9	6	Ricky Stenhouse Jr.	Ford	Roush Fenway Racing
10	20	Joey Logano	Toyota	Joe Gibbs Racing
Official race results

Did not qualify: Mark Green (#70).

=== O'Reilly 300 ===
The O'Reilly 300 was held April 19 at Texas Motor Speedway. Joey Logano took the pole but Kyle Busch won the race.

Top ten finishers
Pos.	Car #	Driver	Make	Team
1	18	Kyle Busch	Toyota	Joe Gibbs Racing
2	20	Joey Logano	Toyota	Joe Gibbs Racing
3	32	Reed Sorenson	Toyota	Braun Racing
4	22	Brad Keselowski	Dodge	Penske Championship Racing
5	33	Kevin Harvick	Chevrolet	Kevin Harvick, Inc.
6	88	Jamie McMurray	Chevrolet	JR Motorsports
7	27	Greg Biffle	Ford	Baker Curb Racing
8	10	David Reutimann	Toyota	Braun Racing
9	66	Steve Wallace	Toyota	Rusty Wallace Racing
10	98	Paul Menard	Ford	Roush Fenway Racing
Official race results

Did not qualify: Jason Keller (#35), Derrike Cope (#73), Josh Wise (#61), Morgan Shepherd (#89).

=== Aaron's 312 ===
The Aaron's 312 was held April 25 at Talladega Superspeedway. Kevin Harvick took the pole but Brad Keselowski won the race.

Top ten finishers
Pos.	Car #	Driver	Make	Team
1	22	Brad Keselowski	Dodge	Penske Championship Racing
2	20	Joey Logano	Toyota	Joe Gibbs Racing
3	33	Kevin Harvick	Chevrolet	Kevin Harvick, Inc.
4	35	Jason Keller	Chevrolet	Tri-Star Motorsports
5	83	Johnny Borneman III	Dodge	Borneman Motorsports
6	21	Clint Bowyer	Chevrolet	Richard Childress Racing
7	34	Tony Raines	Chevrolet	Tri-Star Motorsports
8	98	Paul Menard	Ford	Roush Fenway Racing
9	32	Reed Sorenson	Toyota	Braun Racing
10	11	Brian Scott	Toyota	Braun Racing
Official race results

Did not qualify: Kevin Lepage (#56), Willie Allen (#05), Jeremy Clements (#04), Josh Wise (#61), Derrike Cope (#73).

NOTE: Brad Keselowski suffered a 50-point penalty for infractions discovered during post race inspection.

=== BUBBA Burger 250 ===
The BUBBA Burger 250 was held April 30 at Richmond International Raceway. Kyle Busch took the pole but Brad Keselowski won the race.

Top ten finishers
Pos.	Car #	Driver	Make	Team
1	22	Brad Keselowski	Dodge	Penske Championship Racing
2	27	Greg Biffle	Ford	Baker Curb Racing
3	88	Jamie McMurray	Chevrolet	JR Motorsports
4	18	Kyle Busch	Toyota	Joe Gibbs Racing
5	60	Carl Edwards	Ford	Roush Fenway Racing
6	20	Joey Logano	Toyota	Joe Gibbs Racing
7	33	Kevin Harvick	Chevrolet	Kevin Harvick, Inc.
8	10	Reed Sorenson	Toyota	Braun Racing
9	62	Brendan Gaughan	Toyota	Rusty Wallace Racing
10	16	Matt Kenseth	Ford	Roush Fenway Racing
Official race results

Did not qualify: Danny O'Quinn Jr. (#90).

=== Royal Purple 200 presented by O'Reilly Auto Parts ===
The Royal Purple 200 was held May 7 at Darlington Raceway. Denny Hamlin took the pole and won the race.

Top ten finishers
Pos.	Car #	Driver	Make	Team
1	20	Denny Hamlin	Toyota	Joe Gibbs Racing
2	18	Kyle Busch	Toyota	Joe Gibbs Racing
3	88	Jamie McMurray	Chevrolet	JR Motorsports
4	38	Kasey Kahne	Toyota	Braun Racing
5	10	Jason Leffler	Toyota	Braun Racing
6	60	Carl Edwards	Ford	Roush Fenway Racing
7	22	Brad Keselowski	Dodge	Penske Championship Racing
8	33	Kevin Harvick	Chevrolet	Kevin Harvick, Inc.
9	32	Brian Vickers	Toyota	Braun Racing
10	98	Paul Menard	Ford	Roush Fenway Racing
Official race results

Did not qualify: Willie Allen (#05), Johnny Chapman (#96), Morgan Shepherd (#89).

NOTE: Kasey Kahne suffered a 25-point penalty for an illegal shock found on his car.

=== Heluva Good! 200 ===
The Heluva Good! 200 was held May 15 at Dover International Speedway. Kyle Busch took the pole and won the race.

Top ten finishers
Pos.	Car #	Driver	Make	Team
1	18	Kyle Busch	Toyota	Joe Gibbs Racing
2	1	Ryan Newman	Chevrolet	Phoenix Racing
3	88	Jamie McMurray	Chevrolet	JR Motorsports
4	32	Reed Sorenson	Toyota	Braun Racing
5	10	Jason Leffler	Toyota	Braun Racing
6	33	Kevin Harvick	Chevrolet	Kevin Harvick, Inc.
7	22	Brad Keselowski	Dodge	Penske Championship Racing
8	27	Greg Biffle	Ford	Baker Curb Racing
9	11	Brian Scott	Toyota	Braun Racing
10	16	Colin Braun	Ford	Roush Fenway Racing
Official race results

Did not qualify: Brian Keselowski (#26), Danny O'Quinn Jr. (#39).

- Brian Keselowski replaced Dennis Setzer in the #92 car in the race, after failing to qualify his #26.

=== TECH-NET Auto Service 300 powered by Carquest ===
The TECH-NET Auto Service 300 was held May 29 at Charlotte Motor Speedway. Carl Edwards took the pole but Kyle Busch won the race.

Top ten finishers
Pos.	Car #	Driver	Make	Team
1	18	Kyle Busch	Toyota	Joe Gibbs Racing
2	22	Brad Keselowski	Dodge	Penske Championship Racing
3	20	Joey Logano	Toyota	Joe Gibbs Racing
4	12	Justin Allgaier	Dodge	Penske Championship Racing
5	1	Ryan Newman	Chevrolet	Phoenix Racing
6	33	Kevin Harvick	Chevrolet	Kevin Harvick, Inc.
7	10	Jason Leffler	Toyota	Braun Racing
8	32	Reed Sorenson	Toyota	Braun Racing
9	60	Carl Edwards	Ford	Roush Fenway Racing
10	21	Clint Bowyer	Chevrolet	Richard Childress Racing
Official race results

Did not qualify: Derrike Cope (#73), Parker Kligerman (#42), Brian Keselowski (#26).

- Peyton Sellers (#25) was forced to withdraw after a wreck in final practice.

=== Federated Auto Parts 300 ===
The Federated Auto Parts 300 was held June 5 at Nashville Superspeedway. Justin Allgaier took the pole but Brad Keselowski won this race.

Top ten finishers
Pos.	Car #	Driver	Make	Team
1	22	Brad Keselowski	Dodge	Penske Championship Racing
2	60	Carl Edwards	Ford	Roush Fenway Racing
3	98	Paul Menard	Ford	Roush Fenway Racing
4	12	Justin Allgaier	Dodge	Penske Championship Racing
5	33	Mike Bliss	Chevrolet	Key Motorsports
6	18	Brad Coleman	Toyota	Joe Gibbs Racing
7	32	Reed Sorenson	Toyota	Braun Racing
8	66	Steve Wallace	Toyota	Rusty Wallace Racing
9	21	Scott Riggs	Chevrolet	Richard Childress Racing
10	20	Matt DiBenedetto	Toyota	Joe Gibbs Racing
Official race results

Did not qualify: Kevin Lepage (#56), Ricky Stenhouse Jr. (#6).

NOTE: Tayler Malsam, who finished 11th, and Jason Leffler, who finished 34th, were given a 25-point penalty for an "illegal transfer of tires."

=== Meijer 300 ===
The Meijer 300 was held June 12 at Kentucky Speedway. Joey Logano took the pole and won the race.

Top ten finishers
Pos.	Car #	Driver	Make	Team
1	20	Joey Logano	Toyota	Joe Gibbs Racing
2	60	Carl Edwards	Ford	Roush Fenway Racing
3	22	Brad Keselowski	Dodge	Penske Championship Racing
4	62	Brendan Gaughan	Toyota	Rusty Wallace Racing
5	32	Reed Sorenson	Toyota	Braun Racing
6	66	Steve Wallace	Toyota	Rusty Wallace Racing
7	7	Scott Wimmer	Chevrolet	JR Motorsports
8	12	Justin Allgaier	Dodge	Penske Championship Racing
9	21	Scott Riggs	Chevrolet	Richard Childress Racing
10	16	Colin Braun	Ford	Roush Fenway Racing
Official race results

Did not qualify: Kenny Hendrick (#52), Brian Keselowski (#26).

=== Bucyrus 200 presented by Menards ===
The Bucyrus 200 was held June 19 at Road America. It was the first NASCAR-sanctioned race at Road America in Wisconsin. Carl Edwards took the pole in the #60 Fastenal Ford Fusion and led 35 laps. Because of the unique layout of the track, Road course ringers such as Tony Ave, Ron Fellows, Jacques Villeneuve, Patrick Long, J. R. Fitzpatrick, Kevin O'Connell and Alex Kennedy were picked up by numerous teams to substitute for Nationwide Series regulars. Jacques Villeneuve was one of 2 road ringers to lead laps in the race (the other being Patrick Long), though Edwards was able to hold off Ron Fellows to win the race.

Top ten finishers
Pos.	Car #	Driver	Make	Team
1	60	Carl Edwards	Ford	Roush Fenway Racing
2	88	Ron Fellows	Chevrolet	JR Motorsports
3	62	Brendan Gaughan	Toyota	Rusty Wallace Racing
4	22	Brad Keselowski	Dodge	Penske Championship Racing
5	27	Owen Kelly	Ford	Baker Curb Racing
6	18	Brad Coleman	Toyota	Joe Gibbs Racing
7	7	J. R. Fitzpatrick	Chevrolet	JR Motorsports
8	10	Jason Leffler	Toyota	Braun Racing
9	66	Steve Wallace	Toyota	Rusty Wallace Racing
10	99	Trevor Bayne	Toyota	Diamond-Waltrip Racing
Official race results

Did not qualify: None, only 43 entries.

=== New England 200 ===
The New England 200 was held June 26 at New Hampshire Motor Speedway. Brad Keselowski took the pole but Kyle Busch won the race.

Top ten finishers
Pos.	Car #	Driver	Make	Team
1	18	Kyle Busch	Toyota	Joe Gibbs Racing
2	22	Brad Keselowski	Dodge	Penske Championship Racing
3	60	Carl Edwards	Ford	Roush Fenway Racing
4	20	Joey Logano	Toyota	Joe Gibbs Racing
5	99	Trevor Bayne	Toyota	Diamond-Waltrip Racing
6	12	Justin Allgaier	Dodge	Penske Championship Racing
7	33	Kevin Harvick	Chevrolet	Kevin Harvick, Inc.
8	32	Reed Sorenson	Toyota	Braun Racing
9	98	Paul Menard	Ford	Roush Fenway Racing
10	62	Brendan Gaughan	Toyota	Rusty Wallace Racing
Official race results

Did not qualify: Chris Lawson (#52), Peyton Sellers (#25).

=== Subway Jalapeño 250 presented by Coca-Cola ===
The Subway Jalapeño 250 was held July 2 at Daytona International Raceway. Brad Keselowski took the pole but Dale Earnhardt Jr. won the race.

Top ten finishers
Pos.	Car #	Driver	Make	Team
1	3	Dale Earnhardt Jr.	Chevrolet	Richard Childress Racing
2	20	Joey Logano	Toyota	Joe Gibbs Racing
3	6	Ricky Stenhouse Jr.	Ford	Roush Fenway Racing
4	22	Brad Keselowski	Dodge	Penske Championship Racing
5	33	Kevin Harvick	Chevrolet	Kevin Harvick, Inc.
6	21	Clint Bowyer	Chevrolet	Richard Childress Racing
7	18	Kyle Busch	Toyota	Joe Gibbs Racing
8	1	Ryan Newman	Chevrolet	Phoenix Racing
9	16	Brian Ickler	Ford	Roush Fenway Racing
10	7	Steve Arpin	Chevrolet	JR Motorsports
Official race results

Did not qualify: Carl Long (#68).

=== Dollar General 300 powered by Coca-Cola (Chicagoland) ===
The Dollar General 300 was held July 9 at Chicagoland Speedway. Kevin Harvick took the pole but Kyle Busch won the race.

Top ten finishers
Pos.	Car #	Driver	Make	Team
1	18	Kyle Busch	Toyota	Joe Gibbs Racing
2	20	Joey Logano	Toyota	Joe Gibbs Racing
3	11	Brian Scott	Toyota	Braun Racing
4	10	David Reutimann	Toyota	Braun Racing
5	38	Jason Leffler	Toyota	Braun Racing
6	60	Carl Edwards	Ford	Roush Fenway Racing
7	33	Kevin Harvick	Chevrolet	Kevin Harvick, Inc.
8	32	Reed Sorenson	Toyota	Braun Racing
9	88	Jamie McMurray	Chevrolet	JR Motorsports
10	12	Justin Allgaier	Dodge	Penske Championship Racing
Official race results

Did not qualify: Jeremy Clements (#04), Kevin Hamlin (#36), Brian Keselowski (#26), Jennifer Jo Cobb (#13).

=== Missouri-Illinois Dodge Dealers 250 ===
The Missouri-Illinois Dodge Dealers 250 was held July 17 at Gateway. Trevor Bayne took the pole but Carl Edwards won the race.

Top ten finishers
Pos.	Car #	Driver	Make	Team
1	60	Carl Edwards	Ford	Roush Fenway Racing
2	32	Reed Sorenson	Toyota	Braun Racing
3	99	Trevor Bayne	Toyota	Diamond-Waltrip Racing
4	98	Paul Menard	Ford	Roush Fenway Racing
5	66	Steve Wallace	Toyota	Rusty Wallace Racing
6	11	Brian Scott	Toyota	Braun Racing
7	16	Colin Braun	Ford	Roush Fenway Racing
8	7	Josh Wise	Chevrolet	JR Motorsports
9	6	Ricky Stenhouse Jr.	Ford	Roush Fenway Racing
10	34	Tony Raines	Chevrolet	Tri-Star Motorsports
Official race results

Did not qualify: Chris Lawson (#52), Derrike Cope (#73), Jeremy Clements (#04), Michael McDowell (#81).

NOTE: Carl Edwards suffered a 60-point penalty after intentionally wrecking Brad Keselowski on the last lap of the race.

=== Kroger 200 benefiting Riley Hospital for Children ===
The Kroger 200 was held July 24 at O'Reilly Raceway Park. Trevor Bayne took the pole but Kyle Busch won the race.

Top ten finishers
Pos.	Car #	Driver	Make	Team
1	18	Kyle Busch	Toyota	Joe Gibbs Racing
2	60	Carl Edwards	Ford	Roush Fenway Racing
3	88	Aric Almirola	Chevrolet	JR Motorsports
4	99	Trevor Bayne	Toyota	Diamond-Waltrip Racing
5	32	Reed Sorenson	Toyota	Braun Racing
6	62	Brendan Gaughan	Toyota	Rusty Wallace Racing
7	12	Justin Allgaier	Dodge	Penske Championship Racing
8	22	Brad Keselowski	Dodge	Penske Championship Racing
9	98	Paul Menard	Ford	Roush Fenway Racing
10	66	Steve Wallace	Toyota	Rusty Wallace Racing
Official race results

Did not qualify: None, only 43 entries.

NOTE: Aric Almiorla suffered a 25-point penalty for unknown reasons.

=== U.S. Cellular 250 ===
The U.S. Cellular 250 was held July 31 at Iowa Speedway. Trevor Bayne took the pole but Kyle Busch won the race.

Top ten finishers
Pos.	Car #	Driver	Make	Team
1	18	Kyle Busch	Toyota	Joe Gibbs Racing
2	33	Kevin Harvick	Chevrolet	Kevin Harvick, Inc.
3	38	Jason Leffler	Toyota	Braun Racing
4	22	Brad Keselowski	Dodge	Penske Championship Racing
5	99	Trevor Bayne	Toyota	Diamond-Waltrip Racing
6	66	Steve Wallace	Toyota	Rusty Wallace Racing
7	15	Michael Annett	Toyota	Germain Racing
8	12	Justin Allgaier	Dodge	Penske Championship Racing
9	20	Matt DiBenedetto	Toyota	Joe Gibbs Racing
10	60	Carl Edwards	Ford	Roush Fenway Racing
Official race results

Did not qualify: Eric McClure (#24), Daryl Harr (#02), Johnny Chapman (#89).

=== Zippo 200 at The Glen ===
The Zippo 200 was held August 7 at Watkins Glen International. Marcos Ambrose took the pole and won the race.

Top ten finishers
Pos.	Car #	Driver	Make	Team
1	47	Marcos Ambrose	Toyota	JTG Daugherty Racing
2	20	Joey Logano	Toyota	Joe Gibbs Racing
3	33	Kevin Harvick	Chevrolet	Kevin Harvick, Inc.
4	22	Brad Keselowski	Dodge	Penske Championship Racing
5	18	Kyle Busch	Toyota	Joe Gibbs Racing
6	88	Ron Fellows	Chevrolet	JR Motorsports
7	27	Nelson Piquet Jr.	Ford	Baker Curb Racing
8	32	Jacques Villeneuve	Toyota	Braun Racing
9	66	Steve Wallace	Toyota	Rusty Wallace Racing
10	81	Michael McDowell	Dodge	MacDonald Motorsports
Official race results

Did not qualify: None, only 43 entries.

=== Carfax 250 ===
The Carfax 250 was held August 14 at Michigan International Speedway. Brad Keselowski took the pole and won the race.

Top ten finishers
Pos.	Car #	Driver	Make	Team
1	22	Brad Keselowski	Dodge	Penske Championship Racing
2	60	Carl Edwards	Ford	Roush Fenway Racing
3	18	Kyle Busch	Toyota	Joe Gibbs Racing
4	12	Justin Allgaier	Dodge	Penske Championship Racing
5	98	Paul Menard	Ford	Roush Fenway Racing
6	20	Joey Logano	Toyota	Joe Gibbs Racing
7	88	Elliott Sadler	Chevrolet	JR Motorsports
8	32	Reed Sorenson	Toyota	Braun Racing
9	16	Colin Braun	Ford	Roush Fenway Racing
10	33	Kevin Harvick	Chevrolet	Kevin Harvick, Inc.
Official race results

Did not qualify: Johnny Chapman (#89).

=== Food City 250 ===
The Food City 250 was held August 20 at Bristol Motor Speedway. Elliott Sadler took the pole but Kyle Busch won the race. Busch wrecked Brad Keselowski with 31 laps to go, leading to Keselowki calling Busch "an ass" during driver introductions for the following day's Cup Series race.

Top ten finishers
Pos.	Car #	Driver	Make	Team
1	18	Kyle Busch	Toyota	Joe Gibbs Racing
2	10	Jason Leffler	Toyota	Braun Racing
3	33	Elliott Sadler	Chevrolet	Kevin Harvick, Inc.
4	88	Dale Earnhardt Jr.	Chevrolet	JR Motorsports
5	60	Carl Edwards	Ford	Roush Fenway Racing
6	99	Trevor Bayne	Toyota	Diamond-Waltrip Racing
7	21	Clint Bowyer	Chevrolet	Richard Childress Racing
8	32	Reed Sorenson	Toyota	Braun Racing
9	42	Parker Kligerman	Dodge	Smith-Ganassi Racing
10	20	Joey Logano	Toyota	Joe Gibbs Racing
Official race results

Did not qualify: Kevin Lepage (#56), Eric McClure (#24), Drew Herring (#43), Morgan Shepherd (#89), Ryan Hackett (#76), J. J. Yeley (#61), Chris Lawson (#52).

=== NAPA Auto Parts 200 presented by Dodge ===
The NAPA Auto Parts 200 was held August 29 at Circuit Gilles Villeneuve. Marcos Ambrose took the pole in the #47 Toyota, and although he controlled the race early on, he lost a spark wire with less than 20 laps to go. Then the race was controlled by Robby Gordon who went on to run out of gas on the final restart, giving the race to road course ringer Boris Said. It was the first win by a road course ringer since Ron Fellows' victory at this track in 2008.

Top ten finishers
Pos.	Car #	Driver	Make	Team
1	09	Boris Said	Ford	RAB Racing
2	33	Max Papis	Chevrolet	Kevin Harvick, Inc.
3	32	Jacques Villeneuve	Toyota	Braun Racing
4	22	Brad Keselowski	Dodge	Penske Championship Racing
5	98	Paul Menard	Ford	Roush Fenway Racing
6	20	Joey Logano	Toyota	Joe Gibbs Racing
7	7	J. R. Fitzpatrick	Chevrolet	JR Motorsports
8	26	Parker Kligerman	Dodge	Penske Championship Racing
9	12	Justin Allgaier	Dodge	Penske Championship Racing
10	99	Trevor Bayne	Toyota	Diamond-Waltrip Racing
Official race results

Did not qualify: Stanton Barrett (#41), Kevin O'Connell (#31), Pierre Bourque (#61).

=== Great Clips 300 ===
The Great Clips 300 was held September 4 at Atlanta Motor Speedway. Kasey Kahne took the pole but Jamie McMurray won the race.

Top ten finishers
Pos.	Car #	Driver	Make	Team
1	88	Jamie McMurray	Chevrolet	JR Motorsports
2	18	Kyle Busch	Toyota	Joe Gibbs Racing
3	60	Carl Edwards	Ford	Roush Fenway Racing
4	33	Kevin Harvick	Chevrolet	Kevin Harvick, Inc.
5	16	Matt Kenseth	Ford	Roush Fenway Racing
6	20	Joey Logano	Toyota	Joe Gibbs Racing
7	10	Jason Leffler	Toyota	Braun Racing
8	1	Ryan Newman	Chevrolet	Phoenix Racing
9	98	Paul Menard	Ford	Roush Fenway Racing
10	6	Ricky Stenhouse Jr.	Ford	Roush Fenway Racing
Official race results

Did not qualify: Jeremy Clements (#04).

=== Virginia 529 College Savings 250 ===
The Virginia 529 College Savings 250 was held September 10 at Richmond International Raceway. Kevin Harvick took the pole and won the race.

Top ten finishers
Pos.	Car #	Driver	Make	Team
1	33	Kevin Harvick	Chevrolet	Kevin Harvick, Inc.
2	22	Brad Keselowski	Dodge	Penske Championship Racing
3	99	Trevor Bayne	Toyota	Diamond-Waltrip Racing
4	6	Ricky Stenhouse Jr.	Ford	Roush Fenway Racing
5	32	Reed Sorenson	Toyota	Braun Racing
6	20	Denny Hamlin	Toyota	Joe Gibbs Racing
7	21	Clint Bowyer	Chevrolet	Richard Childress Racing
8	98	Paul Menard	Ford	Roush Fenway Racing
9	18	Kyle Busch	Toyota	Joe Gibbs Racing
10	60	Carl Edwards	Ford	Roush Fenway Racing
Official race results

Did not qualify: Danny Efland (#07).

=== Dover 200 ===
The Dover 200 was held September 25 at Dover International Speedway. Joey Logano took the pole but Kyle Busch won the race.

Top ten finishers
Pos.	Car #	Driver	Make	Team
1	18	Kyle Busch	Toyota	Joe Gibbs Racing
2	20	Joey Logano	Toyota	Joe Gibbs Racing
3	60	Carl Edwards	Ford	Roush Fenway Racing
4	32	Reed Sorenson	Toyota	Turner Motorsports
5	33	Kevin Harvick	Chevrolet	Kevin Harvick, Inc.
6	99	Trevor Bayne	Toyota	Diamond-Waltrip Racing
7	98	Paul Menard	Ford	Roush Fenway Racing
8	38	Jason Leffler	Toyota	Turner Motorsports
9	12	Justin Allgaier	Dodge	Penske Championship Racing
10	1	Ryan Newman	Chevrolet	Phoenix Racing
Official race results

Did not qualify: Stephan McCurley (#51), Alan Tardiff (#39), Donnie Neuenberger (#52), Matt Carter (#82), Kevin Lepage (#56).

=== Kansas Lottery 300 ===
The Kansas Lottery 300 was held October 2 at Kansas Speedway. Joey Logano took the pole and won the race.

Top ten finishers
Pos.	Car #	Driver	Make	Team
1	20	Joey Logano	Toyota	Joe Gibbs Racing
2	22	Brad Keselowski	Dodge	Penske Championship Racing
3	18	Kyle Busch	Toyota	Joe Gibbs Racing
4	33	Kevin Harvick	Chevrolet	Kevin Harvick, Inc.
5	00	Martin Truex Jr.	Toyota	Diamond-Waltrip Racing
6	6	Ricky Stenhouse Jr.	Ford	Roush-Fenway Racing
7	12	Justin Allgaier	Dodge	Penske Championship Racing
8	98	Paul Menard	Ford	Roush Fenway Racing
9	62	Brendan Gaughan	Toyota	Rusty Wallace Racing
10	38	Jason Leffler	Toyota	Turner Motorsports
Official race results

Did not qualify: Andy Ponstein (#92), Johnny Chapman (#89), Daryl Harr (#02), Stephan McCurley (#51), Mark Green (#49), Willie Allen (#05).

=== CampingWorld.com 300 ===
The CampingWorld.com 300 was held October 9 at Auto Club Speedway. Kyle Busch took the pole and won the race.

Top ten finishers
Pos.	Car #	Driver	Make	Team
1	18	Kyle Busch	Toyota	Joe Gibbs Racing
2	22	Brad Keselowski	Dodge	Penske Championship Racing
3	33	Kevin Harvick	Chevrolet	Kevin Harvick, Inc.
4	60	Carl Edwards	Ford	Roush Fenway Racing
5	20	Joey Logano	Toyota	Joe Gibbs Racing
6	88	Aric Almirola	Chevrolet	JR Motorsports
7	1	Ryan Newman	Chevrolet	Phoenix Racing
8	12	Justin Allgaier	Dodge	Penske Championship Racing
9	40	Mike Bliss	Chevrolet	Key Motorsports
10	32	Reed Sorenson	Toyota	Turner Motorsports
Official race results

Did not qualify: Johnny Chapman (#89), Eric McClure (#24).

=== Dollar General 300 (Charlotte) ===
The Dollar General 300 was held October 15 at Charlotte Motor Speedway. Clint Bowyer took the pole but Brad Keselowski won the race.

Top ten finishers
Pos.	Car #	Driver	Make	Team
1	22	Brad Keselowski	Dodge	Penske Championship Racing
2	00	Martin Truex Jr.	Toyota	Diamond-Waltrip Racing
3	12	Justin Allgaier	Dodge	Penske Championship Racing
4	20	Joey Logano	Toyota	Joe Gibbs Racing
5	21	Clint Bowyer	Chevrolet	Richard Childress Racing
6	18	Kyle Busch	Toyota	Joe Gibbs Racing
7	32	Reed Sorenson	Toyota	Turner Motorsports
8	88	Aric Almirola	Chevrolet	JR Motorsports
9	1	Ryan Newman	Chevrolet	Phoenix Racing
10	33	Kevin Harvick	Chevrolet	Kevin Harvick, Inc.
Official race results

Did not qualify: Carl Long (#68), Morgan Shepherd (#89).

=== 5-Hour Energy 250 ===
The 5-Hour Energy 250 was held October 23 at Gateway. Justin Allgaier took the pole but Brad Keselowski won the race.

Top ten finishers
Pos.	Car #	Driver	Make	Team
1	22	Brad Keselowski	Dodge	Penske Championship Racing
2	33	Mike Bliss	Chevrolet	Kevin Harvick, Inc.
3	12	Justin Allgaier	Dodge	Penske Championship Racing
4	38	Jason Leffler	Toyota	Turner Motorsports
5	60	Carl Edwards	Ford	Roush Fenway Racing
6	32	Reed Sorenson	Toyota	Turner Motorsports
7	88	Josh Wise	Chevrolet	JR Motorsports
8	18	Brad Coleman	Toyota	Joe Gibbs Racing
9	98	Paul Menard	Ford	Roush Fenway Racing
10	04	Jeremy Clements	Chevrolet	JD Motorsports
Official race results

Did not qualify: Willie Allen (#05), Mark Green (#49), Tim Schendel (#52), Eric McClure (#24).

=== O'Reilly Auto Parts Challenge ===
The O'Reilly Auto Parts Challenge was held November 6 at Texas Motor Speedway. James Buescher took the pole but Carl Edwards won the race.

Top ten finishers
Pos.	Car #	Driver	Make	Team
1	60	Carl Edwards	Ford	Roush Fenway Racing
2	18	Kyle Busch	Toyota	Joe Gibbs Racing
3	22	Brad Keselowski	Dodge	Penske Championship Racing
4	20	Joey Logano	Toyota	Joe Gibbs Racing
5	99	Martin Truex Jr.	Toyota	Diamond-Waltrip Racing
6	38	Jason Leffler	Toyota	Turner Motorsports
7	32	Reed Sorenson	Toyota	Turner Motorsports
8	33	Kevin Harvick	Chevrolet	Kevin Harvick, Inc.
9	98	Paul Menard	Ford	Roush Fenway Racing
10	66	Steve Wallace	Toyota	Rusty Wallace Racing
Official race results

Did not qualify: Chase Miller (#82), Carl Long (#94), Brian Keselowski (#26), Danny O'Quinn Jr. (#90), Jeff Green (#36), Morgan Shepherd (#89), Mark Green (#49), Mike Harmon (#13).

=== WYPALL 200 powered by Kimberly-Clark Professional ===
The WYPALL 200 was held November 13 at Phoenix International Raceway. Joey Logano took the pole but Carl Edwards won the race.

Top ten finishers
Pos.	Car #	Driver	Make	Team
1	60	Carl Edwards	Ford	Roush Fenway Racing
2	33	Kevin Harvick	Chevrolet	Kevin Harvick, Inc.
3	20	Joey Logano	Toyota	Joe Gibbs Racing
4	22	Brad Keselowski	Dodge	Penske Championship Racing
5	32	Reed Sorenson	Toyota	Turner Motorsports
6	88	Aric Almirola	Chevrolet	JR Motorsports
7	16	Colin Braun	Ford	Roush Fenway Racing
8	12	Justin Allgaier	Dodge	Penske Championship Racing
9	6	Ricky Stenhouse Jr.	Ford	Roush Fenway Racing
10	66	Steve Wallace	Toyota	Rusty Wallace Racing
Official race results

Did not qualify: Brett Rowe (#89), Eric McClure (#24), Daryl Harr (#02), Kevin Lepage (#52), Chase Miller (#82), Carl Long (#94).

=== Ford 300 ===
The Ford 300 was held November 20 at Homestead–Miami Speedway. Joey Logano took the pole but Kyle Busch won the race.

Top ten finishers
Pos.	Car #	Driver	Make	Team
1	18	Kyle Busch	Toyota	Joe Gibbs Racing
2	33	Kevin Harvick	Chevrolet	Kevin Harvick, Inc.
3	22	Brad Keselowski	Dodge	Penske Championship Racing
4	6	Ricky Stenhouse Jr.	Ford	Roush Fenway Racing
5	17	Trevor Bayne	Ford	Roush Fenway Racing
6	60	Carl Edwards	Ford	Roush Fenway Racing
7	20	Joey Logano	Toyota	Joe Gibbs Racing
8	62	Brendan Gaughan	Toyota	Rusty Wallace Racing
9	98	Paul Menard	Ford	Roush Fenway Racing
10	10	Jason Leffler	Toyota	Turner Motorsports
Official race results

Did not qualify: Michael McDowell (#81), Danny O'Quinn Jr. (#90), Tim Andrews (#79), Sean Caisse (#39).

== Final standings ==
=== Full Drivers' Championship ===
(key) Bold – Pole position awarded by time. Italics – Pole position set by owner's points. * – Most laps led.

Pos	Driver	DAY	CAL	LVS	BRI	NSH	PHO	TEX	TAL	RCH	DAR	DOV	CLT	NSH	KEN	ROA	NHA	DAY	CHI	GTY	IRP	IOW	GLN	MCH	BRI	CGV	ATL	RCH	DOV	KAN	CAL	CLT	GTY	TEX	PHO	HOM	Pts
1	Brad Keselowski	13	3	**4**	**2***	5	3	4	1	1*	7	7	2*	1*	3	4	**2**	**4**	21	14*	8	4	4	**1***	14	4	12	2	17	2	2	1	1	3	4	3	5639
2	Carl Edwards	2	4	3	4	6	**6**	30	35	5	6	11	**9**	2	2	**1***	3	11	6	1	2	10	33	2	5	20*	3	10	3	14	4	13	5	1	1*	6	5194
3	Kyle Busch	18	1	16	3	3	1*	1*	34	4	2	**1***	1				1*	7	1*		1*	1*	5	3	1*		2*	9	1*	3*	**1**	6*		2*	16	1*	4934
4	Justin Allgaier	4	9	7	1	4	13	11	15	15	17	16	4	**4**	8	35	6	17	10	25	7	8	34	4	33	9	13	12	9	7	8	3	**3***	13	8	11	4679
5	Paul Menard	6	19	8	11	11	7	10	8	19	10	28	18	3	32	16	9	28	11	4	9	16	17	5	13	5	9	8	7	8	12	35	9	9	13	9	4467
6	Kevin Harvick	3	38	1*	5	1	2	5	**3***	7	8	6	6				7	5	**7**	16		2	3	10			4	**1***	5	4	3*	10		8	2	2	4389
7	Trevor Bayne	41	11	6	30	12	32	14	13	21	16	29	17	32	11	10	5	27	32	**3**	**4**	**5**	29	11	6	10	24	3	6	30	11	17	11	12	14	5	4041
8	Joey Logano	7	**5***		14	**8***	10	**2**	2	6			3		1*		4	2	4				2	6	10	6	6		**2**	**1**	5	4		4	**3**	**7**	4038
9	Jason Leffler	33	14	12	9	39	19	12	41	16	5	5	7	34	33	8	14	14	5	23	30	3	35	34	2	21	7	14	8	10	37	15	4	6	33	10	3941
10	Steve Wallace	10	6	10	38	36	30	9	39	17	12	14	21	8	6	9	11	15	12	5	10	6	9	18	30	38	35	16	12	11	33	29	12	10	10	15	3940
11	Brendan Gaughan	30	24	13	33	10	4	21	27	9	33	13	32	13	4	3	10	29	16	17	6	31	30	32	21	27	16	17	16	9	32	11	26	17	27	8	3767
12	Reed Sorenson				7	2	12	3	40	8		4	8	7	5		8	22	8	2	5	36		8	8		34	5	4	36	10	7	6	7	5	14	3739
13	Michael Annett	12	17	33	20	9	33	16	43	26	11	15	14	14	34	24	19	12	14	11	19	7	19	16	18	25	21	20	15	16	20	36	21	18	18	24	3651
14	Brian Scott **(R)**	19	10	31	29	15	16	15	10	28	25	9	33	28	31	13	26	30	3	6	17	30	13	15	25	40	28	38	13	21	15	28	14	32	11	18	3525
15	Mike Bliss	40	27	27	8	27	38	20		13	32	22	12	5	24	31	34	19	18	19	13	17	14	19	17	15	15	40	18	19	9	31	2	21	12	31	3450
16	Ricky Stenhouse Jr. **(R)**	36	39	30	25	31	9	29	29	20	37	18	40	DNQ		26	16	3	19	9	11	14		13	22	24	10	4	11	6	29	14	23	11	9	4	3419
17	Tony Raines	14	25	22	22	32	14	22	7	24	18	17	25	23	19	36	18	24	23	10	18	29	28	24	26	34	20	18	24	25	19	20	29	25	19	23	3402
18	Mike Wallace	28	12	11	17	17	23	32	42	40	13	34	35	17	21	18	28	34	22	22	22	28	18	20	31	17	36	29	19	12	21	25	16	23	29	30	3204
19	Kenny Wallace	16	29	34	19	25	21	27	11	22	20	21	28	25	22	21	32	31	28	20	35	21	21	29	29	13	25	31	22	26	23	27	13	24	20	28	3198
20	Joe Nemechek	31	23	18	16	28	26	19	36	35	23	26	24		25		23	16	15	27	24	19	23	21	32	28	29	19	25	17	14	41	28	20	28	35	2942
21	Michael McDowell	24	21	39	18	37	18	26	23	29	19	30	20	30	28	33	20	35	35	DNQ	20	13	10	28	20	37	27	37	28	19	18	26	30	36	26	DNQ	2770
22	Jason Keller	DNQ	20	DNQ	27	38	22	DNQ	4	14	21	33	19	20	23		15	20	30	34	32	26		23	12		18	23	27	27	16	32		29		27	2514
23	Colin Braun **(R)**	34	18	28	37	30	34	13	32			10			10	11	12		17	7	12	23	26	9		22				23	13	19	QL		7	29	2474
24	Eric McClure	17	35	21	24	29	27	28	22	31	27	24	29	26	29	27	29	36	29	26	26	DNQ	31	30	DNQ		30	30	29	33	DNQ	33	DNQ	26	DNQ	35	2304
25	Josh Wise	39	37	19	23	20	24	DNQ	DNQ	37	34	36	42	16	15	41	41		40	8		11		40	15		11		39	13		18	7				2161
26	Shelby Howard	DNQ		20	34	16		25	19	30				22	17			26	20	12	14	12		23	24			24		20		39	27	28		36	1962
27	Robert Richardson Jr.	25	33	26		23		23	20			35	23	27	30		27	32	31		15	23		33	28					31	26	33		27		20	1882
28	Morgan Shepherd	22	DNQ	DNQ	35	40	39	DNQ	30	36	DNQ	37	36	35	37	19	22	40	25	21	23	35	32	37	DNQ	35		41	30	37	28	DNQ	18	DNQ	31	26	1865
29	Mark Green	Wth	32	41	DNQ	41	DNQ	42	28	41	22	31	43	36	40	22	33	41	38	43	39	34	24	26	36	19	32	35	26	DNQ	27	40	DNQ	DNQ	38	25	1802
30	Willie Allen		28	25	15	35			DNQ	27	DNQ	23	22	15	36		24		27	15				43	11		23	32	20	DNQ	22		DNQ				1605
31	Brian Keselowski	11	34	32	39	24	20	36	33	43	24	42	DNQ	37	DNQ	40	39		DNQ	38	34	33	27	38			31		41	42	40		41	DNQ	34	34	1566
32	Clint Bowyer						11	35	6	23	39	25	**10**					6							7		14	7				**5**		30			1506
33	Ryan Newman											2	5					8	36				25	36	35		8	21	10		7	9					1393
34	Jeremy Clements	DNQ	DNQ	DNQ		22		33	DNQ				16	19	12			37	DNQ	DNQ		20		25	23		DNQ	34	33	32		34	10	19		39	1390
35	Greg Biffle	26	2	9	6		5	7		2	35	8	13																								1368
36	James Buescher **(R)**	8	13	29	36	34	28	17	37	12	31																			35	17	16		**37**	22		1347
37	Scott Lagasse Jr.	32	15	17	13	21	8	24	21	34	36	19	30	33	16																						1328
38	Jamie McMurray							6	14	3	3	3	11						9								1										1234
39	Parker Kligerman **(R)**	Wth	22	35	DNQ				31				DNQ					13	13						9	8		15		24		43	QL	34		13	1090
40	Kevin Lepage	DNQ	40	37	40	42	40	40	DNQ	38	38	38	37	DNQ	38	43		39	37	35		37		42	DNQ		40	43	DNQ	40	38	38	39	42	DNQ	41	1048
41	Tayler Malsam													11	35	15	35	18		18		27	12	14		23		33									1045
42	Danny O'Quinn Jr.		DNQ	38	41	43	42	39		DNQ	40	DNQ	38	38	41		37		41	37	38	38			16		38		37	39	35		42	DNQ	37	DNQ	1043
43	Danica Patrick	35	31	36													30		24					27					35		30	21	22	22	32	19	1032
44	Aric Almirola																				3							11		22	6	8		16	6	32	1021
45	Kelly Bires		7	42	12	14	17			11										32								27	21			22					1019
46	Jeff Green	27							16					24	20						40	43			43	42	43		43	43	43	42	25	DNQ	43	43	868
47	John Wes Townley	23	30	15	26	18	Wth															24		17	27		22										866
48	David Gilliland				42		41	41		39	41	43	41				38		39						41		17		38	41	36			40	39	40	800
49	Dennis Setzer	Wth	42	43	DNQ	DNQ	43	43	17		43	QL	39	43	43		43		43	42	43	42			42		41		42		42			43	42	42	797
50	Brad Coleman													6	13	6				30						12							8				776
51	Martin Truex Jr.																													5	25	2		5	34	12	771
52	David Reutimann		26					8											4													12		15		16	747
53	Scott Wimmer				10	7			12					21	7																		32				745
54	Scott Riggs	15	16	14	DNQ	19								9	9																						741
55	Kasey Kahne	9			32						4	27	26												37		**19**									38	734
56	Brian Vickers	5	8	5					9		9																										733
57	Coleman Pressley				31					18	15			12	18													25							17		733
58	Derrike Cope	DNQ	36	DNQ	28	26	37	DNQ	DNQ	42	42		DNQ	41	26			38		DNQ				39	39			42	34								709
59	Steve Arpin								26	25	29		34					10		13		18															677
60	Ryan Truex																			28				12				26		15		37	15		23		673
61	Denny Hamlin		2								**1***	12																6									652
62	Elliott Sadler																13							7	**3**			13	31								649
63	Danny Efland	21	41	23				38			26		31					33						41				DNQ			39			41			628
64	Matt DiBenedetto													10		29				29	31	9											24				585
65	David Starr							34										23			21											24		38	25	22	580
66	Brian Ickler												15	29	14			9							19												559
67	Alex Kennedy															28				24			16			26								31	24		531
68	Johnny Borneman III	DNQ	43	DNQ			36		5													25									24				30		496
69	Landon Cassill						36	18				20							33	31								28									483
70	Johnny Chapman	DNQ	DNQ	DNQ	43					33	DNQ	39					40	42	42	40	42	DNQ	40	DNQ			39		40	DNQ	DNQ		37				482
71	Chase Miller					DNQ						40		39	39					36	37	41	39		40		37				41		36	DNQ	DNQ		478
72	Stanton Barrett	37		24							14					17										DNQ								33			445
73	Dale Earnhardt Jr.	29																1*							4												436
74	J. R. Fitzpatrick															7							11			7											422
75	Johnny Sauter	38				13	15													41	25																419
76	Sean Caisse													18	27		21								34								33			DNQ	416
77	Jacques Villeneuve															25							8			3											405
78	Ron Fellows															2							6			30											393
79	Drew Herring																					15			DNQ				38	28			17				376
80	Brad Baker																36		34	33		39					26				34						372
81	Matt Kenseth									10	30																5										362
82	Erik Darnell																											22	14				QL	14			339
83	Victor Gonzalez Jr.						29									23							37			16											337
84	Ricky Carmichael																													18	31			35	21		337
85	Chad McCumbee							31			28	32	27																								298
86	Boris Said																						22			1											287
87	Tony Ave															20							15			36											281
88	Tim Andrews																												36	38			35	39	35	DNQ	266
89	Marcos Ambrose																						**1***			**33**											264
90	Justin Lofton							37									17		26																		249
91	Kyle Kelley															37							20			31											225
92	Ron Hornaday Jr.															12					28																206
93	Tony Stewart	1*																																			195
94	Hermie Sadler									32																		36				30					195
95	Kevin Hamlin											41							DNQ		27		42				42						43				193
96	Bobby Gerhart	20							25																												191
97	Andy Ponstein		DNQ	DNQ	21	DNQ										42														DNQ			38				186
98	Max Papis																									2											175
99	Carl Long																	DNQ						31				39				DNQ	40	DNQ	DNQ		159
100	Owen Kelly															5																					155
101	Kevin Swindell																42			39	33																147
102	Nelson Piquet Jr.																						7														146
103	D. J. Kennington																									11											130
104	Patrick Long															14																					126
105	Robby Gordon																									14											126
106	Chrissy Wallace	43							24																												125
107	Cole Whitt																																		15	17	118
108	Patrick Sheltra								18																												114
109	Charles Lewandoski																31																		40		113
110	Antonio Pérez															38																	34				110
111	Tomy Drissi																									18											109
112	Brandon McReynolds																																19				106
113	Greg Sacks																	21																			100
114	Sam Hornish Jr.																																			21	100
115	Blake Koch																					22															97
116	Jennifer Jo Cobb																	43	DNQ											34							95
117	Marc Davis																												23								94
118	Jason Bowles				DNQ		25																														88
119	Austin Dillon																25																				88
120	Ken Schrader																	25																			88
121	Brad Teague	42			DNQ																				38												86
122	Chris Lawson				DNQ									40			DNQ			DNQ	41				DNQ												83
123	J. C. Stout																				29																76
124	Paulie Harraka																									29											76
125	Matt Carter													42	42								43						DNQ								74
126	Robb Brent															30																					73
127	Casey Mears						31																														70
128	Jarit Johnson													31																							70
129	Brad Sweet																																31				70
130	Tim George Jr.															32																					67
131	Patrick Carpentier																									32											67
132	Mikey Kile					33																															64
133	Chase Mattioli																																			33	64
134	Kevin O'Connell															34										DNQ											61
135	Chase Austin	Wth																						35													58
136	Derrick Griffin																				36																55
137	Billy Johnson																						36														55
138	David Green																																		36		55
139	Peyton Sellers												Wth				DNQ																20				53
140	Donnie Neuenberger	Wth							38			Wth																	DNQ								49
141	Joey Scarallo															39							38														46
142	Andrew Ranger																									39											46
143	Chad Blount			40																																	43
144	Tim Schendel					DNQ																40											DNQ				43
145	Brett Rowe	DNQ				DNQ																				41									DNQ		40
146	Dan Brode																						41														40
147	Justin Marks																									43											34
148	Stephen Leicht		DNQ	DNQ																																	
149	Kenny Hendrick														DNQ																						
150	Daryl Harr																					DNQ								DNQ					DNQ		
151	J. J. Yeley																								DNQ												
152	Ryan Hackett																								DNQ												
153	Pierre Bourque																									DNQ											
154	Alan Tardiff																												DNQ								
155	Stephan McCurley																												DNQ	DNQ							
156	Mike Harmon																																	DNQ			
157	Jeff Fuller	Wth																																			
158	Bobby Santos III																																QL				
Pos	Driver	DAY	CAL	LVS	BRI	NSH	PHO	TEX	TAL	RCH	DAR	DOV	CLT	NSH	KEN	ROA	NHA	DAY	CHI	GTY	IRP	IOW	GLN	MCH	BRI	CGV	ATL	RCH	DOV	KAN	CAL	CLT	GTY	TEX	PHO	HOM	Pts

More: Official standings

=== Declaring for points in one series: Rules change for 2011 ===
This was the last season where Cup Series drivers could run for points in another series. NASCAR implemented this change after Cup drivers were winning the Busch/Nationwide championships over the series regulars for 5 years straight (2006-2010). If the change had been implemented for the 2010 season, Allgaier would have been the champion. The rest of the top 10 in the standings would have been Bayne in 2nd, Leffler, Steve Wallace, Brendan Gaughan (who finished 11th in points), Reed Sorenson (12th), Michael Annett (13th), Brian Scott (14th), Mike Bliss (15th), and Ricky Stenhouse Jr. (16th).

== See also ==
- 2010 NASCAR Sprint Cup Series
- 2010 NASCAR Camping World Truck Series
- 2010 ARCA Racing Series
- 2010 NASCAR Whelen Modified Tour
- 2010 NASCAR Whelen Southern Modified Tour
- 2010 NASCAR Corona Series
- 2010 NASCAR Mini Stock Series
- 2010 NASCAR Canadian Tire Series
