= 2010 DRIVE4COPD 300 =

Race details
- Map of Speedway
- Date: February 13, 2010
- Official name: 2010 DRIVE4COPD 300
- Location: Daytona International Speedway in Daytona Beach, Florida
- Course: Tri-oval
- Course length: 2.5 miles (4.023 km)
- Distance: 120 laps, 300 mi (400 km)
- Weather: Sunny
- Average speed: 123.683 mph (199.048 km/h)
- Attendance: 80,000

Pole position
Driver	Kyle Busch	Joe Gibbs Racing
- Time: no qualifying

Most laps led
Driver	Tony Stewart	Kevin Harvick Inc.
- Laps: 38

Winner
No. 4	Tony Stewart	Kevin Harvick Inc.

Television in the United States
- Network: ESPN2
- Announcers: Marty Reid, Dale Jarrett, Andy Petree

The 2010 DRIVE4COPD 300 was a NASCAR Nationwide Series race held on February 13, 2010, at Daytona International Speedway in Daytona Beach, Florida. The race was the first of the 2010 NASCAR Nationwide Series. It was the 29th iteration of the event. The race featured the NASCAR debut of IZOD IndyCar Series driver Danica Patrick. This would be the last race at Daytona for the Generation 4 cars as the Nationwide Series would debut their Car of Tomorrow cars at the next Daytona race. Kyle Busch won the pole since he was the reigning Series champion from the 2009 season after Qualifying got rained out but it would be Tony Stewart who led the most laps and won the race after starting in 32nd position and it would be his 3rd Nationwide Series opener in a row and his 5th of the last 6 opening races. But the race would be mostly remembered for a flip by Dale Earnhardt Jr.

== Background ==
Daytona International Speedway is a race track in Daytona Beach, Florida, United States. Since opening in 1959, it has been the home of the Daytona 500, the most prestigious race in NASCAR as well as its season opening event. In addition to NASCAR, the track also hosts races for ARCA, AMA Superbike, IMSA, SCCA, and Motocross. The track features multiple layouts including the primary 2.500 mi (4.023 km) high-speed tri-oval, a 3.560 mi (5.729 km) sports car course, a 2.950 mi (4.748 km) motorcycle course, and a 1,320 ft (402.3 m) karting and motorcycle flat-track. The track's 180-acre (72.8 ha) infield includes the 29-acre (11.7 ha) Lake Lloyd, which has hosted powerboat racing. The speedway is operated by NASCAR pursuant to a lease with the City of Daytona Beach on the property that runs until 2054. Dale Earnhardt is Daytona International Speedway's all-time winningest driver, with a total of 34 career victories (12- Daytona 500 Qualifying Races) (7- NASCAR Xfinity Series Races) (6- Busch Clash Races) (6- IROC Races) (2- Pepsi 400 July Races) (1- The 1998 Daytona 500).

== Entry list ==
57 cars originally attempted to qualify for the race but 6 of them withdrew before the race.

- (R) denotes rookie driver

#	Driver	Team	Make
0	Jeremy Clements	JD Motorsports	Chevrolet
01	Mike Wallace	JD Motorsports	Chevrolet
1	James Buescher (R)	Phoenix Racing	Chevrolet
02	Danny Efland	Corrie Stott Racing	Chevrolet
04	Brad Teague	JD Motorsports	Chevrolet
4	Tony Stewart	Kevin Harvick Inc.	Chevrolet
05	Jeff Green	Day Enterprise Racing	Chevrolet
5	Bobby Gerhart	Bob Schacht Motorsports	Chevrolet
6	Ricky Stenhouse Jr. (R)	Roush Fenway Racing	Ford
7	Danica Patrick (R)	JR Motorsports	Chevrolet
09	Scott Riggs	RAB Racing	Ford
10	Jason Leffler	Braun Racing	Toyota
11	Brian Scott (R)	Braun Racing	Toyota
12	Justin Allgaier	Penske Racing	Dodge
15	Michael Annett	Germain Racing	Toyota
16	Colin Braun (R)	Roush Fenway Racing	Ford
18	Kyle Busch	Joe Gibbs Racing	Toyota
20	Joey Logano	Joe Gibbs Racing	Toyota
21	John Wes Townley	Richard Childress Racing	Chevrolet
22	Brad Keselowski	Penske Racing	Dodge
23	Robert Richardson Jr.	R3 Motorsports	Chevrolet
24	Eric McClure	Team Rensi Motorsports	Ford
26	Brian Keselowski	K-Automotive Motorsports	Dodge
27	Greg Biffle	Baker Curb Racing	Ford
28	Kenny Wallace	Jay Robinson Racing	Chevrolet
31	Stanton Barrett	Rick Ware Racing	Chevrolet
32	Brian Vickers	Braun Racing	Toyota
33	Kevin Harvick	Kevin Harvick Inc.	Chevrolet
34	Tony Raines	TriStar Motorsports	Chevrolet
35	Jason Keller	TriStar Motorsports	Chevrolet
38	Kasey Kahne	Braun Racing	Toyota
40	Mike Bliss	Key Motorsports	Chevrolet
41	Chrissy Wallace	Rick Ware Racing	Chevrolet
42	Parker Kligerman	Team 42 Racing	Dodge
43	Scott Lagasse Jr.	Baker Curb Racing	Ford
48	Johnny Sauter	Blanton Racing	Chevrolet
49	Mark Green	Jay Robinson Racing	Chevrolet
52	Donnie Neuenberger	Means Motorsports	Chevrolet
56	Kevin Lepage	Mac Hill Motorsports	Chevrolet
58	Chase Austin	Xxxtreme Motorsports	Chevrolet
60	Carl Edwards	Roush Fenway Racing	Ford
61	Josh Wise	Specialty Racing	Ford
62	Brendan Gaughan	Rusty Wallace Racing	Toyota
66	Steve Wallace	Rusty Wallace Racing	Toyota
70	Shelby Howard	ML Motorsports	Chevrolet
73	Derrike Cope	Stratus Racing Group	Dodge
75	Brett Rowe	Herd Racing	Dodge
81	Michael McDowell	MacDonald Motorsports	Dodge
83	Johnny Borneman III	Borneman Motorsports	Dodge
87	Joe Nemechek	NEMCO Motorsports	Chevrolet
88	Dale Earnhardt Jr.	JR Motorsports	Chevrolet
89	Morgan Shepherd	Faith Motorsports	Chevrolet
92	Johnny Chapman	K-Automotive Motorsports	Dodge
96	Dennis Setzer	K-Automotive Motorsports	Dodge
97	Jeff Fuller	NEMCO Motorsports	Chevrolet
98	Paul Menard	Roush Fenway Racing	Ford
99	Trevor Bayne	Diamond-Waltrip Racing	Toyota
Official Entry List

== Qualifying ==
Kyle Busch won the pole since he was the reigning Series Champion after Qualifying was rained out.

Grid	No.	Driver	Team	Manufacturer
1	18	Kyle Busch	Joe Gibbs Racing	Toyota
2	60	Carl Edwards	Roush Fenway Racing	Ford
3	88	Dale Earnhardt Jr.	JR Motorsports	Chevrolet
4	33	Kevin Harvick	Kevin Harvick Inc.	Chevrolet
5	21	John Wes Townley	Richard Childress Racing	Chevrolet
6	20	Joey Logano	Joe Gibbs Racing	Toyota
7	32	Brian Vickers	Braun Racing	Toyota
8	38	Kasey Kahne	Braun Racing	Toyota
9	16	Colin Braun (R)	Roush Fenway Racing	Ford
10	6	Ricky Stenhouse Jr. (R)	Roush Fenway Racing	Ford
11	1	James Buescher (R)	Phoenix Racing	Chevrolet
12	12	Justin Allgaier	Penske Racing	Dodge
13	66	Steve Wallace	Rusty Wallace Racing	Toyota
14	43	Scott Lagasse Jr.	Baker Curb Racing	Ford
15	7	Danica Patrick (R)	JR Motorsports	Chevrolet
16	62	Brendan Gaughan	Rusty Wallace Racing	Toyota
17	99	Trevor Bayne	Diamond-Waltrip Racing	Toyota
18	15	Michael Annett	Germain Racing	Toyota
19	28	Kenny Wallace	Jay Robinson Racing	Chevrolet
20	34	Tony Raines	TriStar Motorsports	Chevrolet
21	40	Mike Bliss	Key Motorsports	Chevrolet
22	10	Jason Leffler	Braun Racing	Toyota
23	01	Mike Wallace	JD Motorsports	Chevrolet
24	22	Brad Keselowski	Penske Racing	Dodge
25	81	Michael McDowell	MacDonald Motorsports	Dodge
26	24	Eric McClure	Team Rensi Motorsports	Ford
27	23	Robert Richardson Jr.	R3 Motorsports	Chevrolet
28	26	Brian Keselowski	K-Automotive Motorsports	Dodge
29	61	Josh Wise	Specialty Racing	Ford
30	87	Joe Nemechek	NEMCO Motorsports	Chevrolet
31	27	Greg Biffle	Baker Curb Racing	Ford
32	4	Tony Stewart	Kevin Harvick Inc.	Chevrolet
33	05	Jeff Green	Day Enterprise Racing	Chevrolet
34	04	Brad Teague	JD Motorsports	Chevrolet
35	41	Chrissy Wallace	Rick Ware Racing	Chevrolet
36	02	Danny Efland	Corrie Stott Racing	Chevrolet
37	11	Brian Scott (R)	Braun Racing	Toyota
38	48	Johnny Sauter	Blanton Racing	Chevrolet
39	09	Scott Riggs	RAB Racing	Ford
40	89	Morgan Shepherd	Faith Motorsports	Chevrolet
41	31	Stanton Barrett	Rick Ware Racing	Chevrolet
42	5	Bobby Gerhart	Bob Schact Motorsports	Chevrolet
43	98	Paul Menard	Roush Fenway Racing	Ford
Failed to Qualify, driver changes, or withdrew
44	0	Jeremy Clements	JD Motorsports	Chevrolet
45	56	Kevin Lepage	Mac Hill Motorsports	Chevrolet
46	83	Johnny Borneman III	Borneman Motorsports	Dodge
47	75	Brett Rowe	Herd Racing	Dodge
48	73	Derrike Cope	Stratus Racing Group	Dodge
49	92	Johnny Chapman	K-Automotive Motorsports	Dodge
50	35	Jason Keller	TriStar Motorsports	Chevrolet
51	70	Shelby Howard	ML Motorsports	Chevrolet
WD	42	Parker Kligerman	Team 42 Racing	Dodge
WD	49	Mark Green	Jay Robinson Racing	Chevrolet
WD	52	Donnie Neuenberger	Means Motorsports	Chevrolet
WD	58	Chase Austin	Xxxtreme Motorsports	Chevrolet
WD	96	Dennis Setzer	K-Automotive Motorsports	Dodge
WD	97	Jeff Fuller	NEMCO Motorsports	Chevrolet
Official Starting Grid

== Race ==
Kyle Busch took the lead at the start of the race. The first caution did not take long as it happened on the first lap off of turn 4 when Chrissy Wallace, daughter of Mike Wallace and making her Nationwide Series debut, crashed after getting loose. Brad Teague also spun in the tri-oval after going through the grass. Kyle Busch led the first lap of the race. The race restarted in lap 6. On the restart, Kevin Harvick took the lead from Kyle Busch off of turn 4. But on lap 7, the second caution flew for the first of three big ones in the race that occurred in turn 2 taking out 8 cars. It started when Trevor Bayne got turned by Mike Bliss and Bayne turned down into Colin Braun and Bayne spun up and pounded the outside wall driver's side first and also collected Bliss, Mike Wallace, Brian Keselowski, Josh Wise, Michael McDowell, and Paul Menard. The race restarted on lap 12 with Kevin Harvick still leading. Soon a six car breakaway occurred from the pack with Harvick leading Dale Earnhardt Jr., Carl Edwards, Joey Logano, John Wes Townley, and Kyle Busch. On lap 43, green flag pitstops began as Harvick gave up his lead to Kyle Busch. Busch soon pitted on lap 46 giving the lead to Tony Raines who had Joe Nemechek behind him. On lap 50, Nemechek would pass Raines for the lead. On lap 51, the third caution flew when Mike Wallace spun all by himself in turn 3. Greg Biffle was the new leader and Biffle led the field to the restart on lap 56. On lap 62, Brad Keselowski took the lead. On lap 63, Dale Earnhardt Jr. attempted to take the lead but failed to get in front of Keselowski. Coming out of the tri-oval on the next lap, disaster almost struck as Tony Stewart got hooked in the rear by Kevin Harvick causing Stewart to go sideways but Stewart was able to save it without losing momentum. Eventually on the next lap, Stewart would take the lead from Keselowski.

=== Final laps ===
On lap 68, the second big one struck coming into the tri-oval taking out 12 cars. It started when Josh Wise got turned by Colin Braun coming out of turn 4 and Wise turned down into Jason Leffler and the two went spinning collecting Braun, Ricky Stenhouse Jr., Danica Patrick, Brian Scott, John Wes Townley, Robert Richardson Jr. Stanton Barrett, Scott Lagasse Jr., Johnny Sauter, and Joe Nemechek. Carl Edwards won the race off of pit road and he led the field to the restart with 42 laps to go on lap 79. On the restart, Kyle Busch took the lead from Edwards. But on the next lap, Edwards would take the lead back. With 38 laps to go, Dale Earnhardt Jr. took the lead from Edwards. With 37 to go, the 5th caution would fly for debris on the backstretch. The race restarted with 32 to go. With 31 to go, Stewart took the lead from Earnhardt Jr. With 29 to go, the biggest crash of the day occurred on the backstretch which would be the third and final big one of the race taking out 13 cars. It started when Carl Edwards went up and appeared to try to get behind Keselowski but ended up misjudging and making contact with Keselowski that ended up causing a chain reaction wreck turning Keselowski down into Dale Earnhardt Jr. and clipped Junior at the right angle that the grip on the pavement sent his car upside down. Earnhardt also clipped Kevin Harvick sending Harvick spinning through the infield grass. Earnhardt's car stayed upside down for about 5 seconds while getting hit by multiple cars in the process before another car hit him to flip him back on all four wheels and came to a rest on the inside wall right side up. Earnhardt's car was destroyed but thankfully, Junior walked out under his own power uninjured. During the wreck, Brendan Gaughan finished wrecking and tried to nurse his car to pit road. As he was about to start his car again, he got hit from behind by Joe Nemechek that lifted Gaughan's rear of the car off the ground. The cars involved were Mike Wallace, Jeff Green, Scott Riggs, Kyle Busch, Joey Logano, Brad Keselowski, Greg Biffle, Kevin Harvick, Tony Raines, Carl Edwards, Brendan Gaughan, Joe Nemechek, and Dale Earnhardt Jr. The race was red flagged for about 15 minutes to clean up the mess. Steve Wallace was the new race leader and he led the field back to green with 25 laps to go. But on the restart, Tony Stewart would pass Wallace for the lead down the backstretch. With 24 to go, the 7th and final caution flew for debris in turn 3. The race restarted with 20 laps to go. On the final lap, a crash occurred in turns 3 and 4 between Kyle Busch and Brad Keselowski but no caution flew. Stewart was able to hold off the pack in the last 20 laps to pick up the win. This would be Stewart's third Nationwide Series opener in a row and his fifth in the last six years. Carl Edwards, Kevin Harvick, Justin Allgaier, and Brian Vickers rounded out the top 5 while Paul Menard, Joey Logano, James Buescher, Kasey Kahne, and Steve Wallace rounded out the top 10.

== Race results ==
Pos	Car	Driver	Team	Manufacturer	Laps Run	Laps Led	Status	Points
1	4	Tony Stewart	Kevin Harvick Inc.	Chevrolet	120	38	running	195
2	60	Carl Edwards	Roush Fenway Racing	Ford	120	5	running	175
3	33	Kevin Harvick	Kevin Harvick Inc.	Chevrolet	120	37	running	170
4	12	Justin Allgaier	Penske Racing	Dodge	120	0	running	160
5	32	Brian Vickers	Braun Racing	Toyota	120	0	running	155
6	98	Paul Menard	Roush Fenway Racing	Ford	120	0	running	150
7	20	Joey Logano	Joe Gibbs Racing	Toyota	120	0	running	146
8	1	James Buescher (R)	Phoenix Racing	Chevrolet	120	0	running	142
9	38	Kasey Kahne	Braun Racing	Toyota	120	0	running	138
10	66	Steve Wallace	Rusty Wallace Racing	Toyota	120	3	running	139
11	26	Brian Keselowski	K-Automotive Motorsports	Dodge	120	0	running	130
12	15	Michael Annett	Germain Racing	Toyota	120	0	running	127
13	22	Brad Keselowski	Penske Racing	Dodge	120	3	running	129
14	34	Tony Raines	TriStar Motorsports	Chevrolet	120	3	running	126
15	09	Scott Riggs	RAB Racing	Ford	120	0	running	118
16	28	Kenny Wallace	Jay Robinson Racing	Chevrolet	120	0	running	115
17	24	Eric McClure	Team Rensi Motorsports	Ford	120	1	running	117
18	18	Kyle Busch	Joe Gibbs Racing	Toyota	120	10	running	114
19	11	Brian Scott (R)	Braun Racing	Toyota	120	0	running	106
20	5	Bobby Gerhart	Bob Schacht Motorsports	Chevrolet	120	0	running	103
21	02	Danny Efland	Corrie Stott Racing	Chevrolet	120	0	running	100
22	89	Morgan Shepherd	Faith Motorsports	Chevrolet	118	0	running	97
23	21	John Wes Townley	Richard Childress Racing	Chevrolet	118	0	running	94
24	81	Michael McDowell	MacDonald Motorsports	Dodge	113	0	running	91
25	23	Robert Richardson Jr.	R3 Motorsports	Chevrolet	106	0	running	88
26	27	Greg Biffle	Baker Curb Racing	Ford	97	9	crash	90
27	05	Jeff Green	Day Enterprise Racing	Chevrolet	92	0	crash	82
28	01	Mike Wallace	JD Motorsports	Chevrolet	92	1	crash	84
29	88	Dale Earnhardt Jr.	JR Motorsports	Chevrolet	91	7	crash	81
30	62	Brendan Gaughan	Rusty Wallace Racing	Toyota	91	0	crash	73
31	87	Joe Nemechek	NEMCO Motorsports	Chevrolet	91	3	crash	75
32	43	Scott Lagasse Jr.	Baker Curb Racing	Ford	90	0	running	67
33	10	Jason Leffler	Braun Racing	Toyota	76	0	crash	64
34	16	Colin Braun (R)	Roush Fenway Racing	Ford	71	0	crash	61
35	7	Danica Patrick (R)	JR Motorsports	Chevrolet	69	0	crash	58
36	6	Ricky Stenhouse Jr. (R)	Roush Fenway Racing	Ford	68	0	crash	55
37	31	Stanton Barrett	Rick Ware Racing	Chevrolet	67	0	crash	52
38	48	Johnny Sauter	Blanton Motorsports	Chevrolet	67	0	crash	49
39	61	Josh Wise	Specialty Racing	Ford	65	0	crash	46
40	40	Mike Bliss	Key Motorsports	Chevrolet	7	0	crash	43
41	99	Trevor Bayne	Diamond-Waltrip Racing	Toyota	6	0	crash	40
42	04	Brad Teague	JD Motorsports	Chevrolet	2	0	crash	37
43	41	Chrissy Wallace	Rick Ware Racing	Chevrolet	0	0	crash	34
Official race results

Previous race: 2009 Ford 300	NASCAR Nationwide Series; 2010 season	Next race: 2010 Stater Brothers 300
