= 2011 Daytona 500 =

Auto race at Daytona, United States in 2011

Race details
- Race 1 of 36 in the 2011 NASCAR Sprint Cup Series
- Date: February 20, 2011
- Location: Daytona International Speedway; Daytona Beach, Florida, U.S.
- Course: Permanent racing facility 2.5 mi (4.023 km)
- Distance: 208 laps, 520 mi (837 km)
- Scheduled distance: 200 laps, 500 mi (804.672 km)
- Weather: Warm with temperatures reaching up to 79 °F (26 °C); wind speeds approaching 14 miles per hour (23 km/h)
- Average speed: 130.326 miles per hour (209.739 km/h)

Pole position
Driver	Dale Earnhardt Jr.	Hendrick Motorsports
- Time: 48.364

Qualifying race winners
Duel 1 Winner	Kurt Busch	Penske Racing
Duel 2 Winner	Jeff Burton	Richard Childress Racing

Most laps led
Driver	Ryan Newman	Stewart–Haas Racing
- Laps: 37

Winner
No. 21	Trevor Bayne	Wood Brothers Racing

Television in the United States
- Network: Fox Broadcasting Company
- Announcers: Mike Joy, Darrell Waltrip, and Larry McReynolds
- Nielsen ratings: 8.7/20 (15.6 million viewers)

The 2011 Daytona 500, the 53rd running of the event, was held on February 20, 2011, at Daytona International Speedway in Daytona Beach, Florida as the first race of the 2011 NASCAR Sprint Cup season. Trevor Bayne, driving for Wood Brothers Racing, won the race becoming the youngest Daytona 500 winner. Carl Edwards finished second, while David Gilliland, Bobby Labonte, and Kurt Busch rounded out the Top 5. Bayne had taken the lead shortly before the final restart and maintained it to win his first Cup Series race and Wood Brothers' fifth Daytona 500.

During the race there were 16 caution periods. There were 74 lead changes among 22 different drivers. Following the race, Edwards led the Drivers' Championship with 42 points, one ahead of Gilliland and Labonte. Ford led the Manufacturers' Championship with nine points, three ahead of Toyota and five ahead of Dodge. A total of 182,000 people attended the race, while 15.6 million watched it on television.

== Report ==
=== Background ===
Daytona International Speedway is one of six superspeedways to hold NASCAR races. The layout which is used for the Daytona 500 is a four-turn superspeedway that is 2.5 miles (4.0 km) long. The track's turns are banked at 31 degrees, while the front stretch, the location of the finish line, is banked at 18 degrees. Jamie McMurray was the defending race winner.

For the race, NASCAR held several test sessions on January 20–22, 2011 for teams to test the newer pavement at Daytona. Also in the sessions, the opening of the restrictor plate was reduced from the 30/32-inch (24 mm) plate used in tire testing to 29/32-inch (23 mm). NASCAR vice president for competition Robin Pemberton stated, "We'll have to get back and talk to the teams and look at the speeds from the last two days of testing. I think we have some high-water marks at 197-and-a-half [miles per hour (318 km/h)] which, depending on where they pulled up in the draft, it may be a little quick, but it's hard to say."

Every test session began in the morning at 09:00 local time (UTC−05:00), was paused for lunch from 12:00 – 13:00 local time (UTC-05:00), and concluded in the evening at 17:00 local time (UTC-05:00). During the first session on the morning of January 20, 2011, thirty-three drivers participated, and Clint Bowyer was quickest with a speed of 184.216 mph (296.467 km/h) while David Reutimann had the highest speed of 195.780 mph (315.077 km/h) during the second session in the afternoon. The third test session, scheduled for the morning of January 21, was cancelled because of wet weather. During the fourth session, held during the afternoon, 34 drivers participated with Denny Hamlin being quickest with a speed of 196.868 mph (316.828 km/h). Several drivers decided to leave after the session, which included Reutimann, Martin Truex Jr., Jimmie Johnson, and Bowyer. During the fifth session, held on the morning of January 22, 29 drivers participated, and Joey Logano was quickest with a speed of 197.516 mph (317.871 km/h). Brad Keselowski was quickest with a speed of 198.605 mph (319.624 km/h) in the final session.

After the two-car draft style dominated the 2011 Budweiser Shootout, NASCAR reduced the front grille opening to 50 square inches (320 cm^{2}) and the overflow valve for the cooling system would be supplied by NASCAR and set at 33 pounds per square inch (230 kPa; 2.3 bar). Also, high speeds in the race caused NASCAR to reduce the size of the restrictor plate by 1/64 inch (0.40 mm), with the expectations of cutting 10 horsepower from the engines.

This race also marked the tenth anniversary of the death of Dale Earnhardt in 2001. As such, several tributes took place during the race. All of the cars fielded by Earnhardt's former team, Richard Childress Racing, and the team he started, Earnhardt Ganassi Racing, carried No. 3 decals. During the race itself, NASCAR held a "silent lap" on Lap 3, a practice that was first used in memory of Earnhardt during the 2001 season.

== Entry list ==
- (W) denotes past 500 winner.
- (R) denotes rookie driver.
- (i) denotes driver who is ineligible for series driver points.

#	Driver	Team	Make
00	David Reutimann	Michael Waltrip Racing	Toyota
1	Jamie McMurray (W)	Earnhardt Ganassi Racing	Chevrolet
2	Brad Keselowski	Penske Racing	Dodge
4	Kasey Kahne	Red Bull Racing Team	Toyota
5	Mark Martin	Hendrick Motorsports	Chevrolet
6	David Ragan	Roush Fenway Racing	Ford
7	Robby Gordon	Robby Gordon Motorsports	Dodge
09	Bill Elliott (W)	Phoenix Racing	Chevrolet
9	Marcos Ambrose	Richard Petty Motorsports	Ford
11	Denny Hamlin	Joe Gibbs Racing	Toyota
13	Casey Mears	Germain Racing	Toyota
14	Tony Stewart	Stewart–Haas Racing	Chevrolet
15	Michael Waltrip (W)	Michael Waltrip Racing	Toyota
16	Greg Biffle	Roush Fenway Racing	Ford
17	Matt Kenseth (W)	Roush Fenway Racing	Ford
18	Kyle Busch	Joe Gibbs Racing	Toyota
20	Joey Logano	Joe Gibbs Racing	Toyota
21	Trevor Bayne (i)	Wood Brothers Racing	Ford
22	Kurt Busch	Penske Racing	Dodge
24	Jeff Gordon (W)	Hendrick Motorsports	Chevrolet
27	Paul Menard	Richard Childress Racing	Chevrolet
29	Kevin Harvick (W)	Richard Childress Racing	Chevrolet
31	Jeff Burton	Richard Childress Racing	Chevrolet
32	Terry Labonte	FAS Lane Racing	Ford
33	Clint Bowyer	Richard Childress Racing	Chevrolet
34	David Gilliland	Front Row Motorsports	Ford
36	Dave Blaney	Tommy Baldwin Racing	Chevrolet
37	Robert Richardson Jr. (i)	Front Row Motorsports	Ford
38	Travis Kvapil (i)	Front Row Motorsports	Ford
39	Ryan Newman (W)	Stewart–Haas Racing	Chevrolet
42	Juan Pablo Montoya	Earnhardt Ganassi Racing	Chevrolet
43	A. J. Allmendinger	Richard Petty Motorsports	Ford
46	J. J. Yeley	Whitney Motorsports	Chevrolet
47	Bobby Labonte	JTG Daugherty Racing	Toyota
48	Jimmie Johnson (W)	Hendrick Motorsports	Chevrolet
56	Martin Truex Jr.	Michael Waltrip Racing	Toyota
57	Norm Benning	Norm Benning Racing	Chevrolet
60	Todd Bodine (i)	Germain Racing	Toyota
64	Derrike Cope (W)	Max Q Motorsports	Toyota
66	Michael McDowell	HP Racing	Toyota
71	Andy Lally (R)	TRG Motorsports	Chevrolet
77	Steve Wallace (i)	Rusty Wallace Racing	Toyota
78	Regan Smith	Furniture Row Racing	Chevrolet
83	Brian Vickers	Red Bull Racing	Toyota
87	Joe Nemechek (i)	NEMCO Motorsports	Toyota
88	Dale Earnhardt Jr. (W)	Hendrick Motorsports	Chevrolet
92	Brian Keselowski (R)	K-Automotive Motorsports	Dodge
97	Kevin Conway (i)	NEMCO Motorsports	Toyota
99	Carl Edwards	Roush Fenway Racing	Ford
Official Entry list

=== Practice and qualifying ===
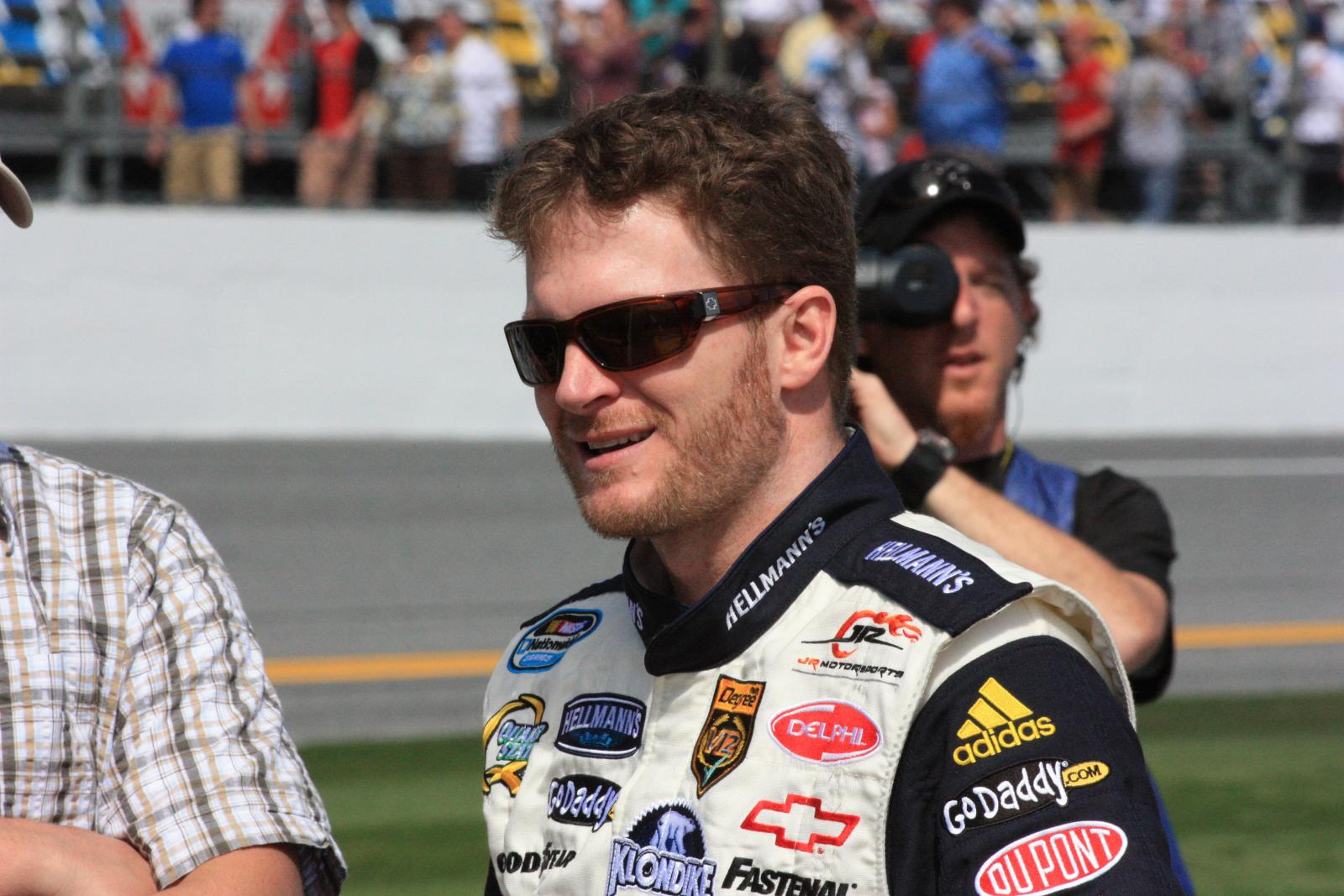
Dale Earnhardt Jr. won the pole position.

Seven practice sessions were held before the race. The first two on February 12 ran 120 minutes and 105 minutes each. The next two on February 16 were for shortened 90 minutes and 55 minutes long after rain delays. Two days later, two more practice sessions were scheduled, which ran 60 and 85 minutes long. The final practice session was held on February 19. Mark Martin was quickest with a time of 48.681 seconds in the first session, less than one-tenth of a second faster than Jeff Gordon. Paul Menard was just off Gordon's pace, followed by Dale Earnhardt Jr., Jeff Burton, and Bill Elliott. Johnson was seventh, still within a second of Martin's time. In the second practice session, Martin remained fastest with a time of 48.567 seconds, less than one-tenth of a second quicker than second-placed Johnson. Burton took third place, ahead of Trevor Bayne, Menard and Gordon. Also in the second practice session, McMurray collided into the wall after his tire failed, and had to move to his back-up car.

Forty-nine cars were entered for qualifying, but only 43 raced per NASCAR's qualifying procedure. Unlike most races during the season, the qualifying session only determined the first two positions, while the rest of the drivers qualified by the 2011 Gatorade Duels. Earnhardt clinched his 10th pole position during his career, with a time of 48.364 seconds. He was joined on the front row of the grid by Jeff Gordon. Once the qualifying session completed, Earnhardt commented, "The main thing [the pole] does for me is take the pressure off Thursday's race. I can go out and have fun and not worry about where I finish or getting a good starting spot for the Daytona 500."

Kyle Busch was quickest in the rain-delayed third practice with 44.943 seconds, followed by Greg Biffle, Earnhardt, Johnson, and Juan Pablo Montoya. Earnhardt and Truex collided and hit the wall, both needing to use their back-up cars which meant Earnhardt forfeited pole position. Kasey Kahne led fourth practice with 44.985 seconds, only one-thousandth of a second faster than Joey Logano. Gordon was third ahead of David Ragan and Kyle Busch. Kurt Busch and Burton were the winners of the Gatorade Duels. The qualifying grid was finalized with Busch in third and Burton fourth. Regan Smith qualified fifth ahead of Bowyer, Kevin Harvick, Waltrip, Matt Kenseth, and Kyle Busch. Drivers who failed to qualify were 1990 winner Derrike Cope, Kevin Conway, Todd Bodine, Michael McDowell and Casey Mears. Norm Benning was entered in his no. 57, but withdrew before qualifying after his car failed to make a lap in practice.

Burton was fastest in fifth practice with a 45.767 seconds lap, ahead of Menard, Ragan, Marcos Ambrose and Hamlin. Martin led the sixth session ahead of Johnson and Kahne. Brian Vickers was next with a 46.225 seconds lap ahead of Biffle with 46.426 seconds. Burton's 44.929 seconds topped the final practice session, followed by Bowyer and Keselowski. Robby Gordon and Kurt Busch rounded out the top five drivers, claiming the fourth and fifth positions respectively.

=== Race ===
The race began at 13:00 local time (UTC−05:00), and was televised live in the United States on Fox. The conditions on the grid were dry before the race with the air temperature at 71 °F (22 °C). Rev. Dr. L. Ronald Durham, senior pastor of the Greater Friendship Baptist Church of Daytona Beach, Florida, began pre-race ceremonies by giving the invocation. Country music artist Martina McBride performed the national anthem, and Josh Duhamel, Rosie Huntington-Whiteley and movie director Michael Bay of the upcoming film Transformers: Dark of the Moon, gave the command for the drivers to start their engines. During the pace laps, Dale Earnhardt Jr.; David Ragan, Joey Logano, and David Reutimann had to move to the rear of the grid due to changing to their back-up car. Transformers themed vehicles painted in the color schemes of Earnhardt Jr.'s, Juan Pablo Montoya's, and Jimmie Johnson's cars led the field during the pace laps as well. The cars were the vehicle modes for the Autobot Wreckers introduced in Dark of the Moon: Leadfoot (Montoya), Roadbuster (Earnhardt Jr.), and Topspin (Johnson). All three heavily armored and armed with various machine guns, including M2 Browning .50-caliber HMGs and M134 miniguns used in the film against the Decepticon Shockwave.

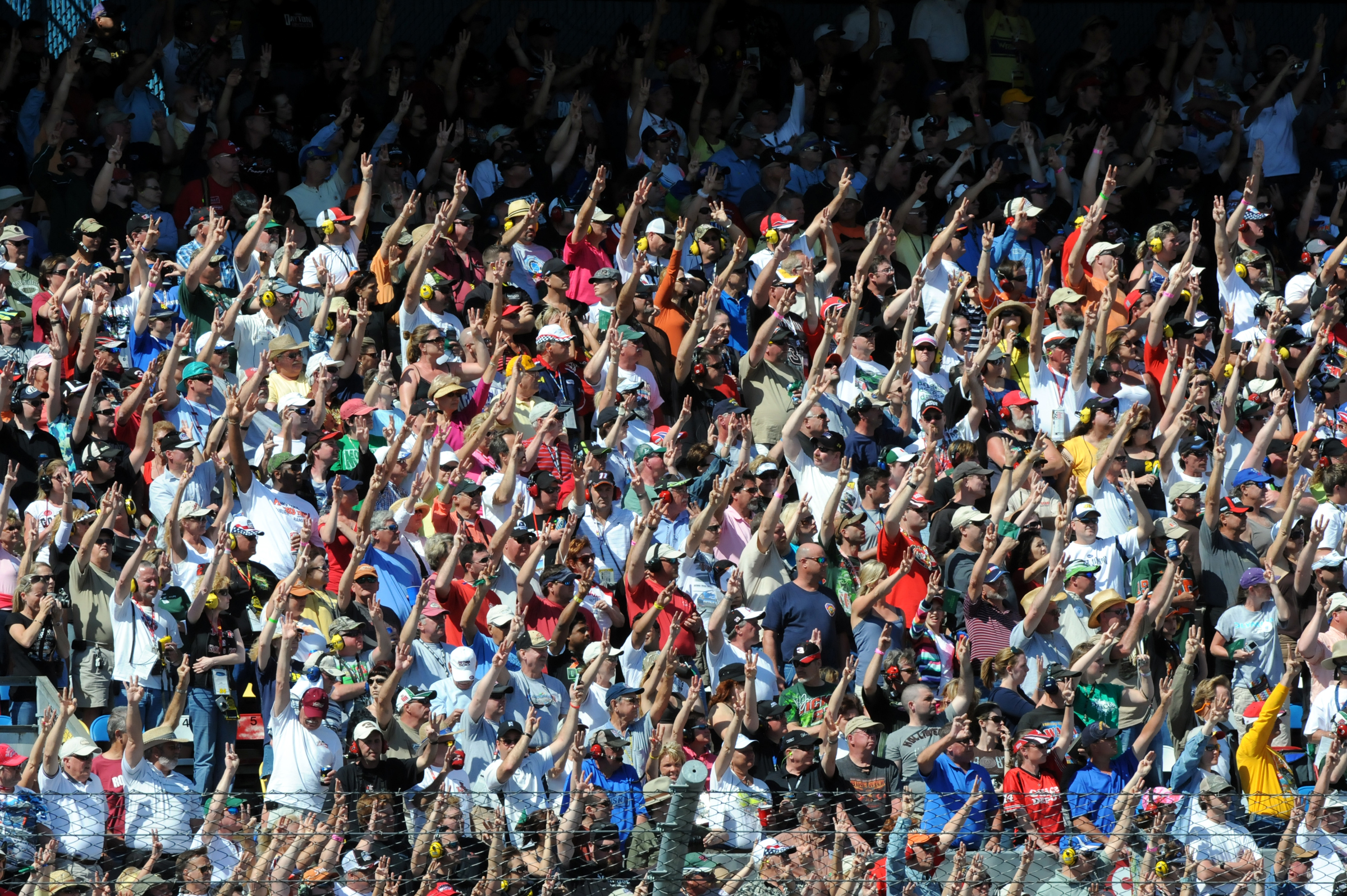
Spectators at the race honoring the 10th anniversary of Dale Earnhardt's death.

Kurt Busch retained his pole position lead into the first corner, followed by outside polesitter Jeff Gordon. On the following lap, Smith began to assist Busch by drafting. On lap 3, NASCAR held a moment of silence to honor Dale Earnhardt, who died ten years ago in the 2001 race. On lap 4, A. J. Allmendinger and Mark Martin moved to the first and second positions. A lap later, the first caution was flown when Kyle Busch got turned sideways. Under caution, he made a pit stop to have his car's toe plate checked and to have the front end aligned. When the race restarted on lap 8, Kevin Harvick led but after one lap, Martin and Allmendinger passed him. Three laps later, the second caution came out when J. J. Yeley had an engine failure. Most of the drivers made pit stops under the caution, except for Brad Keselowski. At the restart, he would lead and Bobby Labonte passed him for the lead on the next lap.

On lap 17, Paul Menard, with assistance from Tony Stewart, took the lead from Labonte. Montoya and Jamie McMurray passed him and Stewart for the first and second positions four laps later. On lap 22, Harvick's engine failed, allowing the third caution to come out. During the caution, most of the front runners made pit stops under caution for mostly fuel, while some decided to change tires. Afterward, Clint Bowyer lead on the restart. He remained leading the next two laps, while Earnhardt Jr. moved to the 5th position. On lap 29, Reutimann and Michael Waltrip collided, causing a multi-car pileup, involving 17 drivers, including three of the four drivers from Hendrick Motorsports: Johnson, Martin, and Gordon. Some of the drivers who have led made pit stops during the caution, while McMurray and Montoya out in front as the race restarted lap 35.

McMurray and Montoya continued to lead for the next three laps, as 14 teams were repairing their cars in the garage after the lap 29 crash. On lap 39, Keselowski retook the lead, after having assistance from Regan Smith. Three laps later, Johnson was preparing to return to the race. On lap 43, Stewart took the lead one lap before Keselowski retook it from him. On lap 45, Bowyer became the quickest in the race with a speed of over 200 mph (320 km/h). Two laps later, Robert Richardson Jr. spun off the bumper of Travis Kvapil, bringing out yet the fifth caution. He sustained major damage to his car in the accident. Under caution, the leaders made pit stops, giving the first and second positions to Terry Labonte and Dave Blaney at the restart. On lap 51, Kurt Busch led before Menard overtook him.

Menard remained leading, as Bowyer and Burton moved to the third and fourth positions on lap 53. On the following lap, they moved to first and second after passing Menard. On lap 57, the sixth caution was given after Brian Vickers' car stalled. The front runners made pit stops during the caution, as McMurray and Montoya reclaimed the first two positions at the restart. On lap 61, Johnson returned to the race after his team repaired the car in the garage. Also on the same lap, Ku. Busch overtook McMurray to become the leader, as both McMurray and Montoya fell to the 17th and 18th positions. On the 63rd lap, Logano, with assistance from Stewart, moved into the fifth position, as Kasey Kahne moved to tenth. By lap 65, Logano and Stewart had fallen to seventh and eighth. On the next lap, Burton moved into the first position. On the 67th lap, Keselowski moved to third, as Smith became the leader. Smith remained the leader until lap 72 when Jeff Burton and Bowyer passed him. By lap 73, the race had 26 lead changes. On the following lap, Burton passed Bowyer for the first position. Three laps later, Kvapil prompted the caution after spinning sideways. At the lap 78 restart, Bowyer was the leader ahead of Earnhardt Jr. in second.

On the following lap, Earnhardt Jr. overtook Bowyer for the first position. On lap 82, McMurray reclaimed the first position, as Smith made a pit stop. After leading one lap, McMurray was passed by Ryan Newman and Logano. On the 86th lap, Martin Truex Jr., with assistance from Carl Edwards, became the leader before Bowyer and Burton passed them on lap 87. Five laps later, Kurt Busch reclaimed the first position as Smith moved into second. On lap 94, Burton's engine failed, but no caution was given. Two laps later, Robby Gordon became the leader, after having assistance from Bayne. On the 100th lap, McMurray reclaimed the first position. On the following lap, Newman became the leader, but after four laps, Gordon passed him for the position. On lap 107, the eighth caution was given after Montoya spun following a bump from teammate McMurray. During the caution all the drivers made pit stops, with Gordon reclaiming the lead afterward. On lap 110, Kurt Busch moved to the first position, but after four laps, he was passed by Bowyer. Bowyer was passed by Truex two laps later on lap 116, but Truex Jr. himself was passed by Busch on the next lap.

On the 118th lap, Bowyer and Menard moved to the first two positions. By lap 120, the race had experienced 47 lead changes among 18 different leaders. Two laps later, Truex reclaimed the first position, as the ninth caution was given for Kvapil. During the caution, most of the front runners made pit stops. At the lap 127 restart, Truex led the field to the green flag, but on the following lap, Bowyer passed him. Seven laps later, the tenth caution was given after Kenseth collided with the wall. Some of the front runners made pit stops during the caution. On the lap 140 restart, Bowyer was the leader, but after one lap, Truex passed him. On lap 143, the eleventh caution was given following contact between Greg Biffle and Montoya. More of the front runners made pit stops again during the caution. At the lap 146 restart, Truex was the leader. One lap later, Earnhardt Jr. claimed the lead for six laps before Newman passed him. On lap 158, a record twelfth caution was given, as Kvapil collided with the wall. Most of the drivers made pit stops during the caution, with Newman the leader. On the lap 163 restart, Newman was the leader ahead of Hamlin and Earnhardt. On the following lap, Hamlin became the leader, as Montoya moved up to third. On lap 167, the thirteenth caution was caused by Keselowski colliding with the wall. The accident also involved Smith and Logano. At the lap 170 restart, Hamlin was the leader, but on the following lap he was passed by Earnhardt Jr.

On the next lap, Newman became the leader, as Logano drove to pit road. On the 173rd lap, Menard moved to the third position, after having assistance from Stewart. Two laps later, Ragan became the leader, but two laps later, Bowyer reclaimed the position. On lap 179, Newman moved up to the first position, as Earnhardt moved to eleventh. Three laps later, Kahne collided with the wall, prompting the caution to come out. On the same lap, McMurray had one cylinder to fail. At the lap 185 restart, Newman remained the leader. On the following lap, Earnhardt and Stewart moved into the third and fourth positions. On lap 192, Bowyer moved up to the third position, then to the first position. Three laps later, Smith moved into the first position. On lap 197, the fifteenth caution was given after Smith spun sideways, as Bowyer was also involved and sustained major damage. During the caution, Earnhardt made a pit stop because of a possible deflating tire. At the lap 202 restart, for a green-white-checker finish, Ragan was the leader, ahead of Bayne.

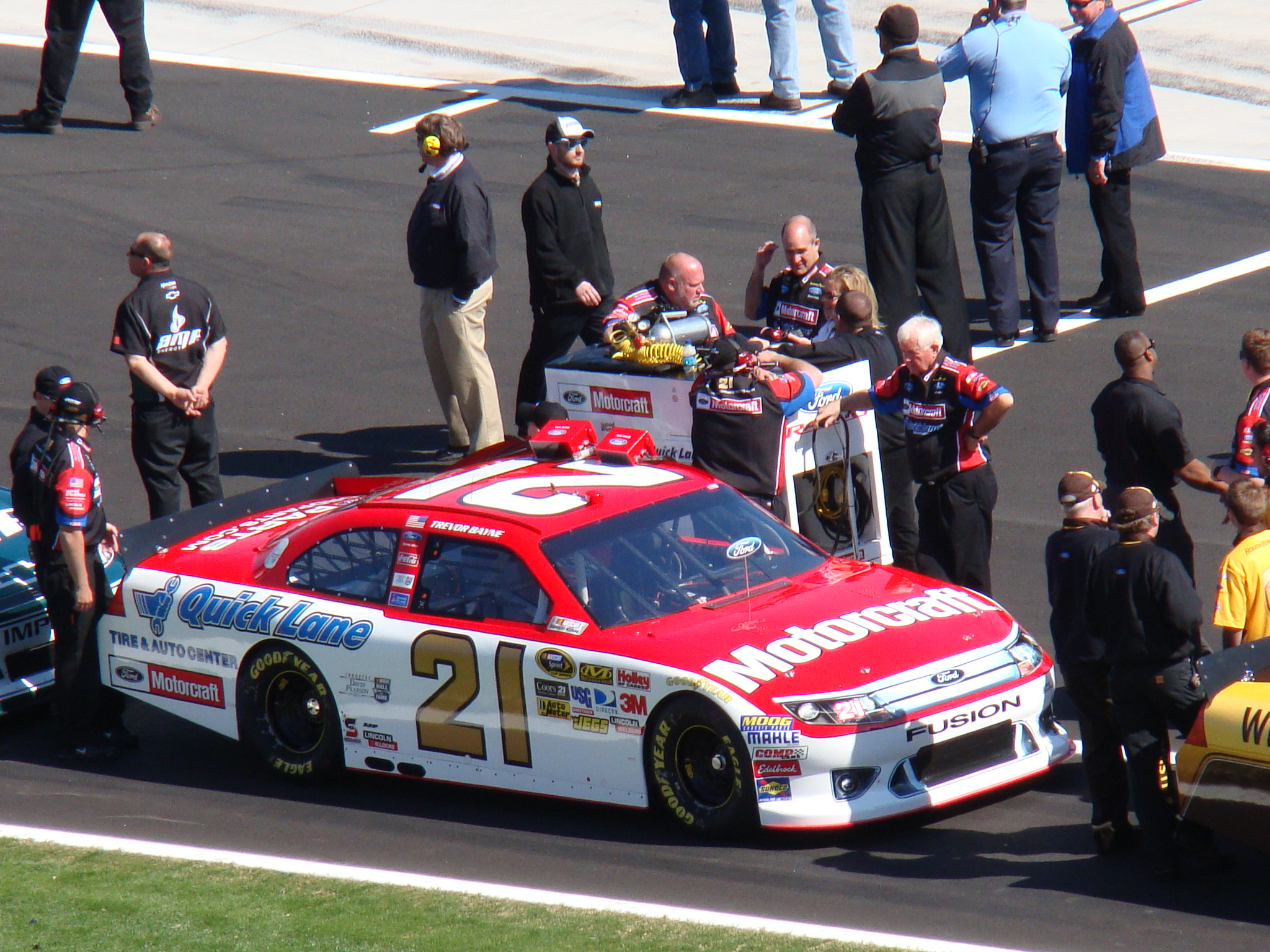
The winning race car, driven by Trevor Bayne.

On the ensuing restart, Ragan was black flagged for changing lanes before the start / finish line just before the sixteenth caution came out after a three-car accident, involving Earnhardt Jr.; Newman; and Truex Jr. During the caution, Ragan drove to pit road, giving the lead to Trevor Bayne, with Labonte second. On the final lap of a second green-white-checker finish, Edwards and David Gilliland mounted a charge on the inside lane. Exiting turn four, Edwards drew alongside Labonte and closed in on Bayne, who moved to the bottom to block Edwards and maintained the lead to win his first race in his Sprint Cup Series career at the age of 20. Edwards finished second, ahead of Gilliland in third and Labonte in fourth. Kurt Busch clinched the fifth position; Montoya, Smith, Kyle Busch, Menard, and Martin rounded out the top ten finishers in the race.

=== Post-race ===
"I keep thinking I'm dreaming. Our first 500—are you kidding me? To win our first one in our second-ever Cup race, I mean this is just incredible. Wow, this is unbelievable. How cool is it to see the Wood Brothers back in victory lane? It's crazy to get my first win before a Nationwide win—I didn't know how to get to victory lane."

— Trevor Bayne, speaking after the race.

The 20-year-old, Bayne, appeared in victory lane after his victory lap to start celebrating his first win of his Sprint Cup Series career, in front of a crowd of 182,000 people. Also by winning the race, he became the youngest winner of the Daytona 500 at 20 years and one day. Jeff Gordon previously held the title at 25 years old. The race was Bayne's second Sprint Cup Series start, and became the Wood Brothers Racing team's fifth Daytona 500 win. He also became the second driver to win the race in his first attempt, with the other being Lee Petty who won the 1959 Daytona 500, which was the inaugural race. With the win coming in his second start in the Sprint Cup Series, Bayne also matched Jamie McMurray for quickest victory at the start of a career (the modern-era record was ultimately broken over 12 years later when Shane van Gisbergen won the 2023 Grant Park 220 in his Cup Series debut); however, since Bayne was racing for the Nationwide Series points championship, he did not earn any Sprint Cup points for the win. The race victory was the Wood Brothers first win since the 2001 season. Following his win, he described his happiness, "If I tried to put it into words, I couldn't do it any justice."

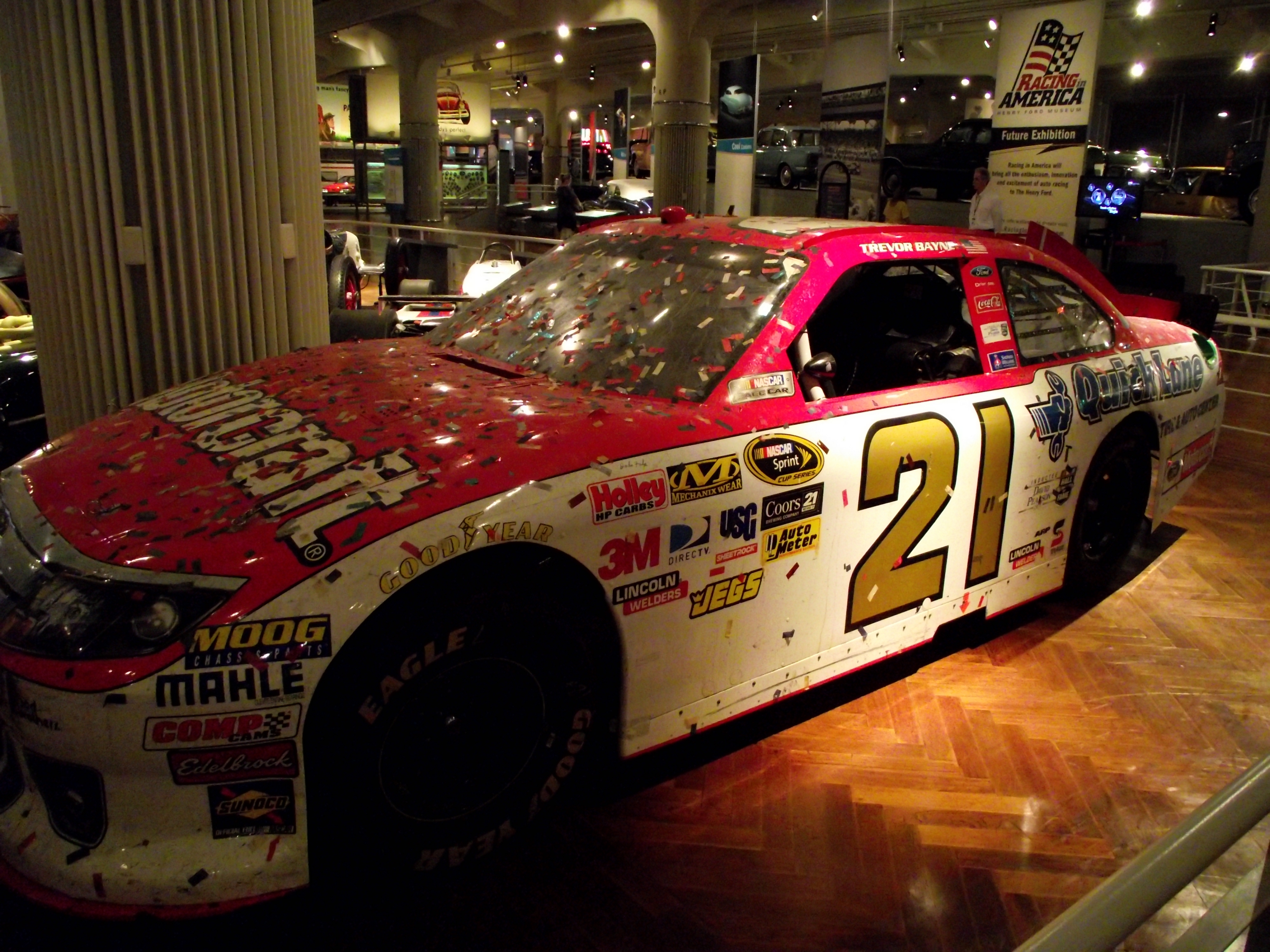
Trevor Bayne - Wood Brothers 2011 Daytona 500 winning Ford, Automotive Hall of Fame, Michigan USA

Following the race, which experienced a record 16 cautions and 74 lead changes, among 22 different drivers, Edwards commented, "A new winner, up-and-coming guy that's tied to so much history. This is as good as it gets. If people aren't watching, that's their problem, because we got some great stuff going on here." In the post-race press conference, the third-place finisher, Gilliland, said, "It's a credit to NASCAR and their new rules, trying to get the (cars) closer, to let teams like us have a chance to be competitive. A lot of the rules (are) making these races more competitive." Jeff Gordon also commented about Bayne, "I think it's very cool. Trevor's a good kid, and I love the Wood Brothers. I'm really happy for him. And I think it's great for the sport. To have a young talent like that – he's got that spark, you know?"

Ragan, who was the leader before the fifteenth caution, described his frustration after being black flagged by saying, "It was tough to swallow. Who knows what would have happened in that next lap? We had a top-five car [Sunday] and we didn't finish in the top five, so that's a bummer. We had a car that could've won the Daytona 500. We were sitting in position and just didn't do it. This thing only comes around once a year, so I'll think about it until we throw the checkered flag on next year's Daytona 500. So it's tough, but there is a bright side – we finished, we got some points and we ran up front, but we just didn't get what we come down here to do."

As Bayne was running for the Nationwide Series Championship and was thus ineligible to receive points, the result left Edwards leading the Driver's Championship with 42 points. Gilliland, who finished third, was second with 41, which was tied with Bobby Labonte and was one point ahead of Kurt Busch. Montoya was fifth with 39 points. In the Manufacturers' Championship, Ford became the leader with 9 points. Toyota became second with 6 points. Dodge followed with 4 points, one point ahead of Chevrolet in fourth. 15.6 million people watched the race on television. The race took three hours, fifty-nine minutes and twenty-four seconds to complete, and the margin of victory was 0.118 seconds.

== Results ==
=== Qualifying ===
Grid	Car	Driver	Team	Manufacturer
1	88	Dale Earnhardt Jr.	Hendrick Motorsports	Chevrolet
2	24	Jeff Gordon	Hendrick Motorsports	Chevrolet
3	22	Kurt Busch	Penske Racing	Dodge
4	31	Jeff Burton	Richard Childress Racing	Chevrolet
5	78	Regan Smith	Furniture Row Racing	Chevrolet
6	33	Clint Bowyer	Richard Childress Racing	Chevrolet
7	29	Kevin Harvick	Richard Childress Racing	Chevrolet
8	15	Michael Waltrip	Michael Waltrip Racing	Toyota
9	17	Matt Kenseth	Roush Fenway Racing	Ford
10	18	Kyle Busch	Joe Gibbs Racing	Toyota
11	4	Kasey Kahne	Red Bull Racing Team	Toyota
12	92	Brian Keselowski (R)	K-Automotive Motorsports	Dodge
13	42	Juan Pablo Montoya	Earnhardt Ganassi Racing	Chevrolet
14	1	Jamie McMurray	Earnhardt Ganassi Racing	Chevrolet
15	43	A. J. Allmendinger	Richard Petty Motorsports	Ford
16	2	Brad Keselowski	Penske Racing	Dodge
17	5	Mark Martin	Hendrick Motorsports	Chevrolet
18	11	Denny Hamlin	Joe Gibbs Racing	Toyota
19	27	Paul Menard	Richard Childress Racing	Chevrolet
20	56	Martin Truex Jr.	Michael Waltrip Racing	Toyota
21	39	Ryan Newman	Stewart–Haas Racing	Chevrolet
22	99	Carl Edwards	Roush Fenway Racing	Ford
23	48	Jimmie Johnson	Hendrick Motorsports	Chevrolet
24	00	David Reutimann	Michael Waltrip Racing	Toyota
25	14	Tony Stewart	Stewart–Haas Racing	Chevrolet
26	16	Greg Biffle	Roush Fenway Racing	Ford
27	83	Brian Vickers	Red Bull Racing Team	Toyota
28	37	Robert Richardson Jr. (i)	Front Row Motorsports	Ford
29	09	Bill Elliott	Phoenix Racing	Chevrolet
30	7	Robby Gordon	Robby Gordon Motorsports	Dodge
31	47	Bobby Labonte	JTG Daugherty Racing	Toyota
32	21	Trevor Bayne (i)	Wood Brothers Racing	Ford
33	46	J. J. Yeley	Whitney Motorsports	Chevrolet
34	6	David Ragan	Roush Fenway Racing	Ford
35	9	Marcos Ambrose	Richard Petty Motorsports	Ford
36	77	Steve Wallace (i)	Rusty Wallace Racing	Toyota
37	71	Andy Lally (R)	TRG Motorsports	Chevrolet
38	20	Joey Logano	Joe Gibbs Racing	Toyota
39	34	David Gilliland	Front Row Motorsports	Ford
40	38	Travis Kvapil (i)	Front Row Motorsports	Ford
41	87	Joe Nemechek (i)	NEMCO Motorsports	Toyota
42	36	Dave Blaney	Tommy Baldwin Racing	Chevrolet
43	32	Terry Labonte	FAS Lane Racing	Ford
Failed to Qualify
44	64	Derrike Cope	Gunselman Motorsports	Toyota
45	97	Kevin Conway	NEMCO Motorsports	Toyota
46	60	Todd Bodine (i)	Germain Racing	Toyota
47	66	Michael McDowell	HP Racing	Toyota
48	13	Casey Mears	Germain Racing	Toyota
WD	57	Norm Benning	Norm Benning Racing	Chevrolet

=== Race ===
Pos	Grid	No.	Driver	Team	Manufacturer	Laps	Points
1	32	21	Trevor Bayne (i)	Wood Brothers Racing	Ford	208	0^{3}
2	22	99	Carl Edwards	Roush Fenway Racing	Ford	208	42
3	39	34	David Gilliland	Front Row Motorsports	Ford	208	41^{1}
4	31	47	Bobby Labonte	JTG Daugherty Racing	Toyota	208	41^{1}
5	3	22	Kurt Busch	Penske Racing	Dodge	208	40^{1}
6	13	42	Juan Pablo Montoya	Earnhardt Ganassi Racing	Chevrolet	208	39^{1}
7	5	78	Regan Smith	Furniture Row Racing	Chevrolet	208	38^{1}
8	10	18	Kyle Busch	Joe Gibbs Racing	Toyota	208	37^{1}
9	19	27	Paul Menard	Richard Childress Racing	Chevrolet	208	36^{1}
10	17	5	Mark Martin	Hendrick Motorsports	Chevrolet	208	34
11	15	43	A. J. Allmendinger	Richard Petty Motorsports	Ford	208	34^{1}
12	29	09	Bill Elliott	Phoenix Racing	Chevrolet	208	32
13	25	14	Tony Stewart	Stewart–Haas Racing	Chevrolet	208	31
14	34	6	David Ragan	Roush Fenway Racing	Ford	208	31^{1}
15	43	32	Terry Labonte	FAS Lane Racing	Ford	208	30^{1}
16	30	7	Robby Gordon	Robby Gordon Motorsports	Dodge	208	29^{1}
17	6	33	Clint Bowyer	Richard Childress Racing	Chevrolet	208	28^{1}
18	14	1	Jamie McMurray	Earnhardt Ganassi Racing	Chevrolet	208	27^{1}
19	20	56	Martin Truex Jr.	Michael Waltrip Racing	Toyota	208	26^{1}
20	36	77	Steve Wallace (i)	Rusty Wallace Racing	Toyota	208	0^{3}
21	18	11	Denny Hamlin	Joe Gibbs Racing	Toyota	207	24^{1}
22	21	39	Ryan Newman	Stewart–Haas Racing	Chevrolet	206	24^{2}
23	38	20	Joey Logano	Joe Gibbs Racing	Toyota	206	21
24	1	88	Dale Earnhardt Jr.	Hendrick Motorsports	Chevrolet	202	21^{1}
25	11	4	Kasey Kahne	Red Bull Racing Team	Toyota	199	19
26	42	36	Dave Blaney	Tommy Baldwin Racing	Chevrolet	198	19^{1}
27	23	48	Jimmie Johnson	Hendrick Motorsports	Chevrolet	189	17
28	2	24	Jeff Gordon	Hendrick Motorsports	Chevrolet	173	17^{1}
29	16	2	Brad Keselowski	Penske Racing	Dodge	166	16^{1}
30	24	00	David Reutimann	Michael Waltrip Racing	Toyota	164	14
31	27	83	Brian Vickers	Red Bull Racing Team	Toyota	160	13
32	40	38	Travis Kvapil (i)	Front Row Motorsports	Ford	153	0^{3}
33	37	71	Andy Lally (R)	TRG Motorsports	Chevrolet	149	11
34	9	17	Matt Kenseth	Roush Fenway Racing	Ford	133	10
35	26	16	Greg Biffle	Roush Fenway Racing	Ford	126	9
36	4	31	Jeff Burton	Richard Childress Racing	Chevrolet	92	9^{1}
37	35	9	Marcos Ambrose	Richard Petty Motorsports	Ford	82	7
38	28	37	Robert Richardson Jr. (i)	Front Row Motorsports	Ford	45	0^{3}
39	41	87	Joe Nemechek (i)	NEMCO Motorsports	Toyota	29	0^{3}
40	8	15	Michael Waltrip	Michael Waltrip Racing	Toyota	28	4
41	12	92	Brian Keselowski	K-Automotive Motorsports	Dodge	28	3
42	7	29	Kevin Harvick	Richard Childress Racing	Chevrolet	22	2^{1}
43	33	46	J. J. Yeley	Whitney Motorsports	Chevrolet	10	1
^{1} Includes one bonus point for leading a lap
^{2} Includes two bonus points for leading the most laps
^{3} Ineligible for championship points

== Standings after the race ==
Drivers' Championship standings
Pos	Driver	Points
1	Carl Edwards	42
2	David Gilliland	41
3	Bobby Labonte	41
4	Kurt Busch	40
5	Juan Pablo Montoya	39

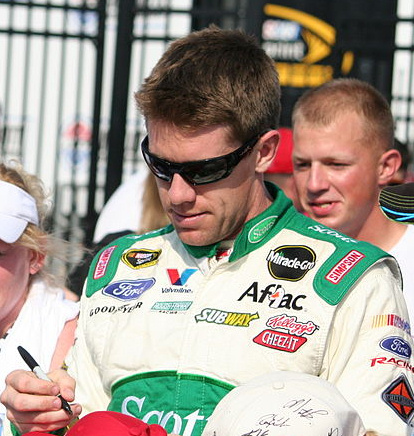
As Bayne was ineligible for series points, Carl Edwards led the Drivers' Championship standings with 42 points.

Manufacturers' Championship standings
Pos	Manufacturer	Points
1	Ford	9
2	Toyota	6
3	Dodge	4
4	Chevrolet	3

- Note: Only the top five positions are included for the driver standings.

Previous race: 2010 Ford 400	Sprint Cup Series; 2011 season	Next race: 2011 Subway Fresh Fit 500
