= 2010 Subway Jalapeño 250 =

Race details
- Race 17 of 35 in the 2010 NASCAR Sprint Cup Series
- Map of Speedway
- Date: July 2, 2010
- Official name: Subway Jalapeño 250 Powered by Coca-Cola
- Location: Daytona International Speedway; Daytona Beach, Florida
- Course: Permanent racing facility
- Course length: 2.5 miles (4.023 km)
- Distance: 102 laps, 255 mi (410 km)
- Scheduled distance: 100 laps, 250 mi (400 km)
- Weather: Clear
- Average speed: 146.248 mph (235.363 km/h)
- Attendance: 55,000

Pole position
Driver	Brad Keselowski	Penske Racing
- Time: 49.172

Most laps led
Driver	Dale Earnhardt Jr.	Richard Childress Racing
- Laps: 33

Winner
No. 3	Dale Earnhardt Jr.	Richard Childress Racing

Television in the United States
- Network: ESPN
- Announcers: Allen Bestwick, Dale Jarrett, Andy Petree

The 2010 Subway Jalapeño 250 Powered by Coca-Cola was a NASCAR Nationwide Series stock car race held on July 2, 2010, at the Daytona International Speedway in Daytona Beach, Florida, before 55,000 spectators. It was the 17th race of the 2010 NASCAR Nationwide Series season and the ninth running of the event. Richard Childress Racing driver Dale Earnhardt Jr. won the 102-lap race – extended from the scheduled 100-lap distance due to a green–white–checkered finish. Joey Logano, driving for Joe Gibbs Racing, finished second, and Ricky Stenhouse Jr. finished third for Roush Fenway Racing.

Earnhardt Jr.'s victory was an emotional one for him and his team, as he drove a throwback paint scheme to his father Dale Earnhardt's iconic Wrangler Jeans scheme. It marked the first time since prior to Earnhardt's death in the 2001 Daytona 500 that the #3 had been raced in the Nationwide Series, and according to Earnhardt Jr., it would be his last time driving a #3 car in a NASCAR race. This race was also the first for the "new car" for the Nationwide Series, which debuted full-time in 2011.

== Background ==
Daytona International Speedway (pictured in 2015), where the race was held.

The Subway Jalapeño 250 was confirmed to be on the Nationwide Series' 2010 schedule in September 2009. It was the 17th of 35 scheduled races in the 2010 NASCAR Nationwide Series season, and the ninth annual edition of the event, dating back to 2002. The race was scheduled to be held on Friday, July 2, 2010, for 100 laps over a distance of 250 miles (402.336 kilometres) at the Daytona International Speedway in Daytona Beach, Florida, which has hosted NASCAR races since it opened in 1959. The track is a 2.500 mi (4.023 km) tri-oval superspeedway with four turns, each of which are banked at 31°. The start-finish line is banked at 18°.

Entering the event, Brad Keselowski of Team Penske maintained his Drivers' Championship lead with 2,641 points. Carl Edwards was in second with 2,394 points, and Justin Allgaier placed third with 2,201 points. Kyle Busch and Kevin Harvick rounded out the top five.

=== Entry list ===
- (R) denotes rookie driver

#	Driver	Team	Make
01	Mike Wallace	JD Motorsports	Chevrolet
1	Ryan Newman	Phoenix Racing	Chevrolet
3	Dale Earnhardt Jr.	JR Motorsports/Richard Childress Racing	Chevrolet
04	Jeremy Clements	JD Motorsports	Chevrolet
05	David Starr	Day Enterprise Racing	Chevrolet
6	Ricky Stenhouse Jr. (R)	Roush Fenway Racing	Ford
07	Danny Efland	Danny Efland Racing	Chevrolet
7	Steve Arpin	JR Motorsports	Chevrolet
09	Ken Schrader	RAB Racing	Ford
10	Tayler Malsam	Braun Racing	Toyota
11	Brian Scott (R)	Braun Racing	Toyota
12	Justin Allgaier	Penske Racing	Dodge
15	Michael Annett	Germain Racing	Toyota
16	Brian Ickler	Roush Fenway Racing	Ford
18	Kyle Busch	Joe Gibbs Racing	Toyota
20	Joey Logano	Joe Gibbs Racing	Toyota
21	Clint Bowyer	Richard Childress Racing	Chevrolet
22	Brad Keselowski	Penske Racing	Dodge
23	Robert Richardson Jr.	R3 Motorsports	Chevrolet
24	Eric McClure	Team Rensi Motorsports	Ford
26	Parker Kligerman	Penske Racing	Dodge
27	Jennifer Jo Cobb	Baker Curb Racing	Ford
28	Kenny Wallace	Jay Robinson Racing	Chevrolet
32	Reed Sorenson	Braun Racing	Toyota
33	Kevin Harvick	Kevin Harvick Inc.	Chevrolet
34	Tony Raines	TriStar Motorsports	Chevrolet
35	Jason Keller	TriStar Motorsports	Chevrolet
38	Jason Leffler	Braun Racing	Toyota
40	Mike Bliss	Key Motorsports	Chevrolet
43	Johnny Chapman	Baker Curb Racing	Chevrolet
49	Mark Green	Jay Robinson Racing	Chevrolet
56	Kevin Lepage	Mac Hill Motorsports	Toyota
60	Carl Edwards	Roush Fenway Racing	Ford
62	Brendan Gaughan	Rusty Wallace Racing	Toyota
66	Steve Wallace	Rusty Wallace Racing	Toyota
68	Carl Long	Fleur-de-lis Motorsports	Chevrolet
70	Shelby Howard	ML Motorsports	Chevrolet
73	Derrike Cope	Stratus Racing Group Inc.	Dodge
81	Michael McDowell	MacDonald Motorsports	Dodge
87	Joe Nemechek	NEMCO Motorsports	Chevrolet
88	Greg Sacks	JR Motorsports	Chevrolet
89	Morgan Shepherd	Faith Motorsports	Chevrolet
98	Paul Menard	Roush Fenway Racing	Ford
99	Trevor Bayne	Diamond-Waltrip Racing	Toyota
Official Entry List

== Qualifying ==
Brad Keselowski won the pole with a time of 49.172 and a speed of 183.031. Penske Racing dominated the first two rows with Keselowski's teammates Parker Kligerman and Justin Allgaier starting in 2nd and 4th.

Grid	No.	Driver	Team	Manufacturer	Time	Speed
1	22	Brad Keselowski	Penske Racing	Dodge	49.172	183.031
2	26	Parker Kligerman	Penske Racing	Dodge	49.385	182.242
3	3	Dale Earnhardt Jr.	JR Motorsports/Richard Childress Racing	Chevrolet	49.386	182.238
4	12	Justin Allgaier	Penske Racing	Dodge	49.485	181.873
5	18	Kyle Busch	Joe Gibbs Racing	Toyota	49.502	181.811
6	6	Ricky Stenhouse Jr. (R)	Roush Fenway Racing	Ford	49.536	181.686
7	88	Greg Sacks	JR Motorsports	Chevrolet	49.540	181.671
8	1	Ryan Newman	Phoenix Racing	Chevrolet	49.561	181.594
9	33	Kevin Harvick	Kevin Harvick Inc.	Chevrolet	49.594	181.474
10	20	Joey Logano	Joe Gibbs Racing	Toyota	49.602	181.444
11	60	Carl Edwards	Roush Fenway Racing	Ford	49.605	181.433
12	99	Trevor Bayne**	Diamond-Waltrip Racing	Toyota	49.624	181.364
13	21	Clint Bowyer	Richard Childress Racing	Chevrolet	49.659	181.236
14	98	Paul Menard	Roush Fenway Racing	Ford	49.732	180.970
15	7	Steve Arpin	JR Motorsports	Chevrolet	49.744	180.926
16	70	Shelby Howard	ML Motorsports	Chevrolet	49.808	180.694
17	15	Michael Annett	Germain Racing	Toyota	49.841	180.574
18	16	Brian Ickler	Roush Fenway Racing	Ford	49.854	180.527
19	62	Brendan Gaughan	Rusty Wallace Racing	Toyota	49.868	180.476
20	38	Jason Leffler	Braun Racing	Toyota	49.870	180.469
21	09	Ken Schrader	RAB Racing	Ford	49.945	180.198
22	56	Kevin Lepage**	Mac Hill Motorsports	Toyota	49.984	180.058
23	11	Brian Scott (R)	Braun Racing	Toyota	50.009	179.968
24	05	David Starr	Day Enterprise Racing	Chevrolet	50.017	179.939
25	10	Tayler Malsam	Braun Racing	Toyota	50.081	179.709
26	01	Mike Wallace	JD Motorsports	Chevrolet	50.138	179.505
27	66	Steve Wallace	Rusty Wallace Racing	Toyota	50.145	179.480
28	40	Mike Bliss	Key Motorsports	Chevrolet	50.173	179.379
29	24	Eric McClure	Team Rensi Motorsports	Ford	50.180	179.354
30	07	Danny Efland	Danny Efland Racing	Chevrolet	50.200	179.283
31	81	Michael McDowell	MacDonald Motorsports	Dodge	50.208	179.254
32	32	Reed Sorenson**	Braun Racing	Toyota	50.209	179.251
33	73	Derrike Cope	Stratus Racing Group Inc.	Dodge	50.218	179.219
34	35	Jason Keller	TriStar Motorsports	Chevrolet	50.237	179.151
35	87	Joe Nemechek	NEMCO Motorsports	Chevrolet	50.248	179.112
36	04	Jeremy Clements	JD Motorsports	Chevrolet	50.292	178.955
37	89	Morgan Shepherd	Faith Motorsports	Chevrolet	50.302	178.919
38	34	Tony Raines	TriStar Motorsports	Chevrolet	50.363	178.703
39	23	Robert Richardson Jr.	R3 Motorsports	Chevrolet	50.927	176.724
40	43	Johnny Chapman	Baker Curb Racing	Chevrolet	51.623	174.341
41	27	Jennifer Jo Cobb* **	Baker Curb Racing	Ford	—	—
42	28	Kenny Wallace*	Jay Robinson Racing	Chevrolet	—	—
43	49	Mark Green	Jay Robinson Racing	Chevrolet	50.604	177.852
Failed to Qualify, withdrew, or driver changes
44	68	Carl Long	Fleur-de-lis Motorsports	Chevrolet	50.852	176.984
Official Starting Lineup

* – Made the field via owners points.

** – Jennifer Jo Cobb, Reed Sorenson, Kevin Lepage, and Trevor Bayne all had to start at the rear of the field. Sorenson and Lepage had adjustments during impound, Cobb had a transmission change, and Bayne missed the drivers meeting.

== Race ==
Pole sitter Brad Keselowski led the first lap of the race. On lap 3, Dale Earnhardt Jr. took the lead from Keselowski while the moment of silence was going on to honor Dale Earnhardt but Keselowski immeadeatly took it back off of turn 4. On lap 6, Earnhardt Jr. tried again but failed to do so. The first caution flew on lap 7 when Jennifer Jo Cobb and Johnny Chapman crashed in turn 4. The race would restart on lap 12. On the restart, Kevin Harvick took the lead from Keselowski. On lap 14, Carl Edwards took the lead with a push from Clint Bowyer. On lap 16, Clint Bowyer took the lead. On lap 27, Keselowski took the lead from Bowyer. On lap 32, Brad Keselowski went to pit giving the lead to Kyle Busch. While that was happening, the second caution flew when Michael Annett spun after he got loose coming out of turn 4. Kyle Busch won the race off of pit road and led the field to the restart on lap 36. On lap 41, Joey Logano took the lead but Clint Bowyer would take it on the next lap. On lap 48, Kyle Busch took the lead. On lap 50, Justin Allgaier took the lead.

=== Final laps ===
With 41 laps to go, Paul Menard hit the wall in turn 2 but no caution was thrown. With 40 laps to go, Kyle Busch took the lead. With 31 to go, Dale Earnhardt Jr. took the lead. On the same lap, the third caution flew for debris. The race would restart with 26 laps to go. With 19 laps to go, Justin Allgaier's rear bumper flew up after what appears to be because Brad Keselowski bumped him too hard down the backstretch. Allgaier almost spun in turns 1 and 2 with 18 to go due to the rear bumper issue. Meanwhile, Dale Earnhardt Jr. continued to lead as he had a small pack of 3 other cars behind him in Kevin Harvick, Kyle Busch, and Joey Logano ready to pounce at some point. But with 5 laps to go, Paul Menard's left front tire exploded and laid debris on the racetrack which brought out the 4th and final caution of the race. The caution would set up a green-white-checkered finish. During the caution, some drivers pitted including Kyle Busch while others didn't including Dale Earnhardt Jr. On the restart, Earnhardt Jr. took the lead from Kevin Harvick on the restart with a big push by Joey Logano. During the final lap, Brendan Gaughan got into the wall but no caution was thrown. On the last lap, Earnhardt Jr. held off the pack including some attempted passes from Joey Logano that Jr. blocked and Dale Earnhardt Jr. took the #3 Wrangler Jeans throwback Chevrolet to victory lane at Daytona. The victory was a very emotional moment for everyone who was a part of the team and for the Earnhardt fans even having Earnhardt Jr's crew chief Tony Eury Jr. tearing up during his interview after the win. Everyone in the crowd was holding up three fingers in honor of Earnhardt Sr. after Earnhardt Jr. took the win and saluting the crowd. During his interview, Dale Earnhardt Jr. said that he plans to not run the #3 ever again in his career which would be the case as he never ran the #3 scheme ever again for the rest of his career after this win. Joey Logano, Ricky Stenhouse Jr., Brad Keselowski, and Kevin Harvick rounded out the top 5 while Clint Bowyer, Kyle Busch, Ryan Newman, Brian Ickler, and Steve Arpin rounded out the top 10.

== Race results ==
Pos	Car	Driver	Team	Manufacturer	Laps Run	Laps Led	Status	Points
1	3	Dale Earnhardt Jr.	JR Motorsports/Richard Childress Racing	Chevrolet	102	33	running	195
2	20	Joey Logano	Joe Gibbs Racing	Toyota	102	1	running	175
3	6	Ricky Stenhouse Jr. (R)	Roush Fenway Racing	Ford	102	0	running	165
4	22	Brad Keselowski	Penske Racing	Dodge	102	16	running	165
5	33	Kevin Harvick	Kevin Harvick Inc.	Chevrolet	102	3	running	160
6	21	Clint Bowyer	Richard Childress Racing	Chevrolet	102	17	running	155
7	18	Kyle Busch	Joe Gibbs Racing	Chevrolet	102	19	running	151
8	1	Ryan Newman	Phoenix Racing	Chevrolet	102	0	running	142
9	16	Brian Ickler	Roush Fenway Racing	Ford	102	0	running	138
10	7	Steve Arpin	JR Motorsports	Chevrolet	102	0	running	134
11	60	Carl Edwards	Roush Fenway Racing	Ford	102	2	running	135
12	15	Michael Annett	Germain Racing	Toyota	102	0	running	127
13	26	Parker Kligerman	Penske Racing	Dodge	102	0	running	124
14	38	Jason Leffler	Braun Racing	Toyota	102	0	running	121
15	66	Steve Wallace	Rusty Wallace Racing	Toyota	102	0	running	118
16	87	Joe Nemechek	NEMCO Motorsports	Chevrolet	102	0	running	115
17	12	Justin Allgaier	Penske Racing	Dodge	102	11	running	117
18	10	Tayler Malsam	Braun Racing	Toyota	102	0	running	109
19	40	Mike Bliss	Key Motorsports	Chevrolet	102	0	running	106
20	35	Jason Keller	TriStar Motorsports	Chevrolet	102	0	running	103
21	88	Greg Sacks	JR Motorsports	Chevrolet	102	0	running	100
22	32	Reed Sorenson	Braun Racing	Toyota	102	0	running	97
23	05	David Starr	Day Enterprise Racing	Chevrolet	102	0	running	94
24	34	Tony Raines	TriStar Motorsports	Chevrolet	102	0	running	91
25	09	Ken Schrader	RAB Racing	Ford	102	0	running	88
26	70	Shelby Howard	ML Motorsports	Chevrolet	102	0	running	85
27	99	Trevor Bayne	Diamond-Waltrip Racing	Toyota	102	0	running	82
28	98	Paul Menard	Roush Fenway Racing	Ford	102	0	running	79
29	62	Brendan Gaughan	Rusty Wallace Racing	Toyota	102	0	running	76
30	11	Brian Scott (R)	Braun Racing	Toyota	101	0	running	73
31	28	Kenny Wallace	Jay Robinson Racing	Chevrolet	101	0	running	70
32	23	Robert Richardson Jr.	R3 Motorsports	Chevrolet	101	0	running	67
33	07	Danny Efland	Danny Efland Racing	Chevrolet	101	0	running	64
34	01	Mike Wallace	JD Motorsports	Chevrolet	101	0	running	61
35	81	Michael McDowell	MacDonald Motorsports	Dodge	101	0	running	58
36	24	Eric McClure	Team Rensi Motorsports	Ford	98	0	running	55
37	04	Jeremy Clements	JD Motorsports	Chevrolet	90	0	ignition	52
38	73	Derrike Cope	Stratus Racing Group Inc.	Dodge	77	0	vibration	49
39	56	Kevin Lepage	Mac Hill Motorsports	Toyota	77	0	running	46
40	89	Morgan Shepherd	Faith Motorsports	Chevrolet	17	0	electrical	43
41	49	Mark Green	Jay Robinson Racing	Chevrolet	10	0	electrical	40
42	43	Johnny Chapman	Baker Curb Racing	Chevrolet	5	0	crash	37
43	27	Jennifer Jo Cobb	Baker Curb Racing	Ford	5	0	crash	34
Official Race results

Previous race: 2010 New England 200	NASCAR Nationwide Series; 2010 season	Next race: 2010 Dollar General 300
