= Steve Wallace (racing driver) =

American racing driver (born 1987)

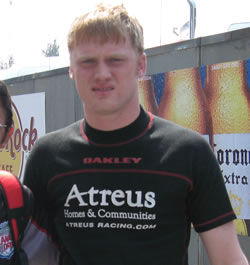
- Wallace in 2008
- Born: August 18, 1987 (age 39); Charlotte, North Carolina, U.S.
- Achievements: 2004 Snowball Derby Winner; 2017 Redbud 400 Winner; 2014 World Series of Asphalt Super Late Model Champion; 2014 Clyde Hart Memorial Winner
- Awards: 2004 UARA-Stars Rookie of the Year

NASCAR Cup Series career
- 1 race run over 1 year
- Best finish: 57th (2011)
- First race: 2011 Daytona 500 (Daytona)
| Wins | Top tens | Poles |
|---|---|---|
| 0 | 0 | 0 |

NASCAR O'Reilly Auto Parts Series career
- 193 races run over 9 years
- 2013 position: 73rd
- Best finish: 7th (2009)
- First race: 2005 Sam's Town 250 (Memphis)
- Last race: 2013 History 300 (Charlotte)
| Wins | Top tens | Poles |
|---|---|---|
| 0 | 34 | 2 |

NASCAR FedEx Freight Truck Series career
- 7 races run over 2 years
- 2013 position: 96th
- Best finish: 52nd (2010)
- First race: 2010 E-Z-GO 200 (Atlanta)
- Last race: 2013 Lucas Oil 150 (Phoenix)
| Wins | Top tens | Poles |
|---|---|---|
| 0 | 1 | 0 |
- Statistics up to date as of November 16, 2013.

Stephen Wallace (born August 18, 1987) is an American stock car racing driver. A current super late model racer, he is the son of 1989 Winston Cup champion Rusty Wallace, the nephew of NASCAR drivers Kenny and Mike Wallace, and cousin of Chrissy Wallace. Steve has made starts in all three of NASCAR's national series as well as the ARCA Racing Series, and won the Snowball Derby in 2004.

== Racing career ==
=== Early racing ===
Between 1998 and 2002, Wallace raced in INEX Bandoleros. He captured multiple series championships. Steve raced in Legends cars and late model racecars near his hometown of Mooresville, North Carolina. He won both the Summer Shootout (twice) and Winter Shootout (once) at Lowe's Motor Speedway. He also won multiple championships at Concord Motor Speedway. In December 2004, at the age of seventeen, he won one of the biggest short track races in the country, the Snowball Derby, in Pensacola, Florida, a race Rusty and Kenny both entered, but failed to win in their careers. Steve was also the 2004 UARA Rookie of The Year. He won the first ever late model race at Bristol Motor Speedway.

In 2005, Wallace ran nearly the entire season in USAR Hooters Pro Cup competition. He finished with three top-ten finishes and qualified for the post-season championship series. A day after Steve turned eighteen, he became the youngest winner at a Michigan International Speedway event in an ARCA race while driving a Penske Racing Dodge. He raced in ARCA with several other teams that season. He also finished fifteenth in his first NASCAR Nationwide Series race at Memphis Motorsports Park (after starting eleventh). Wallace became part of the Dodge factory driver development program.

=== Nationwide Series ===
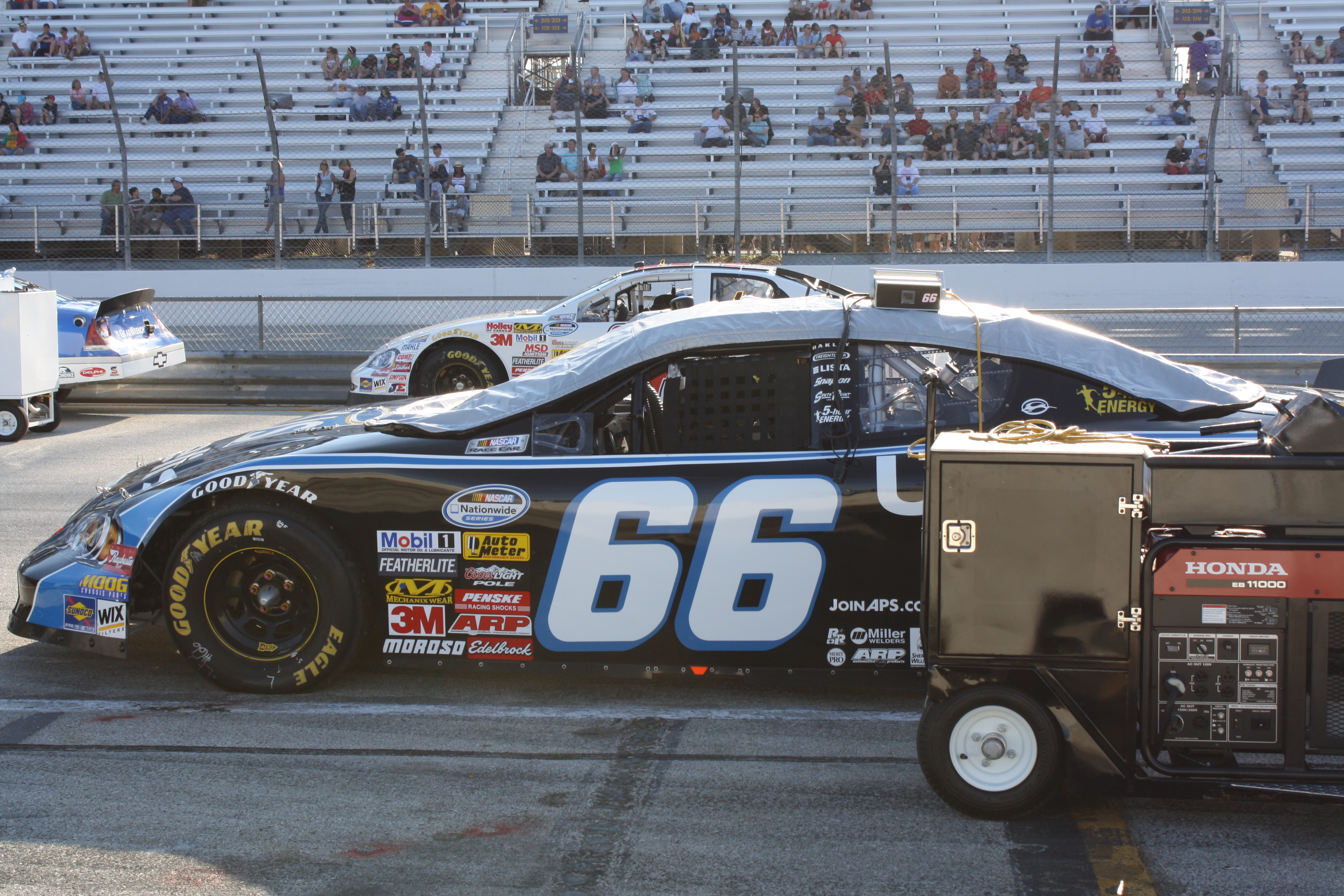
Wallace's #66 Nationwide car in 2009

Wallace raced seventeen races in the No. 64 Dodge Nationwide Series car in 2006 (sharing with Jamie McMurray), as well as six ARCA series races in a Penske Racing car. Wallace won ARCA races at Michigan International Speedway and Kentucky Speedway, and had a best finish of eleventh in the Busch Series.

For the 2007 NASCAR Busch Series season, Wallace would race full-time. He won his first career pole at Bristol Motor Speedway. Wallace won his second pole on June 9, 2007, at Nashville Superspeedway in Lebanon, Tennessee. Before the conclusion of the 2007 Nationwide Series Season, it was announced that Wallace would be switching from Dodge to Chevrolet for the 2008 Season.

Wallace first career top-five came at Richmond International Raceway on May 2, 2008.

At the beginning of the 2012 season, Wallace was without a car because of the temporary closure of Rusty Wallace Racing. After missing the first six races, he announced that he would make his first start of the season at Richmond International Speedway during the Virginia 529 College Savings 250.

=== Sprint Cup Series ===
Wallace made his sole Cup Series start in the 2011 Daytona 500. Penske Racing transferred the owner points of his No. 77, whose thirtieth place finish in 2010 guaranteed Wallace a start. He drove the No. 77 Toyota to a twentieth place finish.

=== Camping World Truck Series ===
In 2010, Wallace ran a partial Truck Series schedule for Billy Ballew Motorsports, finishing fourth in his debut at Atlanta.

On July 10, 2013, it was announced that Wallace would return to the Truck Series with Adrian Carriers Racing for four races starting with the American Ethanol 200.

=== Super late model career ===
After his NASCAR career ended, Wallace began racing super late model race cars. At a CARS Tour-sanctioned race at Fairgrounds Speedway in 2018, Wallace was parked early in the race for wrecking Mason Mingus and later fought with Mingus and his Wauters Motorsports team. After the fight, Wallace said that the incident was one worthy of the beginning of a war.

== Personal life ==
Wallace is the youngest son of ESPN announcer and former NASCAR driver Rusty Wallace. He has been diagnosed with Tourette syndrome.

In 2019, Wallace co-founded Southern Country Customs, a custom motorcycle fabrication company specializing in high-performance Harley-Davidson builds, alongside his father, Rusty. As of 2026 Wallace now serves as the main owner and continues to work on motorcycles.

== Motorsports career results ==
=== NASCAR ===
(key) (Bold - Pole position awarded by time. Italics - Pole position earned by points standings. * – Most laps led.)

==== Sprint Cup Series ====
NASCAR Sprint Cup Series results
| Year | Team | No. | Make | 1 | 2 | 3 | 4 | 5 | 6 | 7 | 8 | 9 | 10 | 11 | 12 | 13 | 14 | 15 | 16 | 17 | 18 | 19 | 20 | 21 | 22 | 23 | 24 | 25 | 26 | 27 | 28 | 29 | 30 | 31 | 32 | 33 | 34 | 35 | 36 | NSCC | Pts | Ref |
|---|---|---|---|---|---|---|---|---|---|---|---|---|---|---|---|---|---|---|---|---|---|---|---|---|---|---|---|---|---|---|---|---|---|---|---|---|---|---|---|---|---|---|
| 2011 | Rusty Wallace Racing | 77 | Toyota | DAY; 20 | PHO | LVS | BRI | CAL | MAR | TEX | TAL | RCH | DAR | DOV | CLT | KAN | POC | MCH | SON | DAY | KEN | NHA | IND | POC | GLN | MCH | BRI | ATL | RCH | CHI | NHA | DOV | KAN | CLT | TAL | MAR | TEX | PHO | HOM | 57th | 0^{1} | |

===== Daytona 500 =====
| Year | Team | Manufacturer | Start | Finish |
|---|---|---|---|---|
| 2011 | Rusty Wallace Racing | Toyota | 36 | 20 |

==== Nationwide Series ====
NASCAR Nationwide Series results
| Year | Team | No. | Make | 1 | 2 | 3 | 4 | 5 | 6 | 7 | 8 | 9 | 10 | 11 | 12 | 13 | 14 | 15 | 16 | 17 | 18 | 19 | 20 | 21 | 22 | 23 | 24 | 25 | 26 | 27 | 28 | 29 | 30 | 31 | 32 | 33 | 34 | 35 | NNSC | Pts | Ref |
|---|---|---|---|---|---|---|---|---|---|---|---|---|---|---|---|---|---|---|---|---|---|---|---|---|---|---|---|---|---|---|---|---|---|---|---|---|---|---|---|---|---|
| 2005 | Rusty Wallace Racing | 64 | Dodge | DAY | CAL | MXC | LVS | ATL | NSH | BRI | TEX | PHO | TAL | DAR | RCH | CLT | DOV | NSH | KEN | MLW | DAY | CHI | NHA | PPR | GTY | IRP | GLN | MCH | BRI | CAL | RCH | DOV | KAN | CLT | MEM; 15 | TEX | PHO | HOM | 105th | 118 | |
| 2006 | Rusty Wallace Racing | 64 | Dodge | DAY | CAL | MXC | LVS | ATL | BRI; 33 | TEX | NSH; 12 | PHO | TAL | RCH; 28 | DAR | CLT | DOV; 38 | NSH; 15 | KEN; 11 | MLW; 25 | DAY | CHI | NHA | MAR; 35 | GTY; 31 | IRP; 30 | GLN | MCH; 24 | BRI | CAL | RCH | | KAN; 24 | CLT | MEM; 20 | TEX; 31 | | HOM; 22 | 36th | 1528 | |
| 2006 | Rusty Wallace Racing | 61 | Dodge | | | | | | | | | | | | | | | | | | | | | | | | | | | | | DOV; 21 | | | | | PHO; 16 | | 36th | 1528 | |
| 2007 | Rusty Wallace Racing | 66 | Dodge | DAY; 30 | CAL; 22 | MXC; 18 | LVS; 17 | ATL; 35 | **BRI**; 31 | NSH; 14 | TEX; 32 | PHO; 29 | TAL; 26 | RCH; 32 | DAR; 39 | CLT; 30 | DOV; 22 | **NSH**; 12 | KEN; 22 | MLW; 27 | NHA; 15 | DAY; 39 | CHI; 32 | GTY; 28 | IRP; 17 | CGV; 32 | GLN; 34 | MCH; 37 | BRI; 32 | CAL; 25 | RCH; 18 | DOV; 22 | KAN; 37 | CLT | MEM; 35 | TEX; 23 | PHO; 37 | HOM; 34 | 19th | 2752 | |
| 2008 | Rusty Wallace Racing | 66 | Chevy | DAY; 37 | CAL; 15 | LVS; 30 | ATL; 18 | BRI; 16 | NSH; 24 | TEX; 16 | PHO; 16 | MXC; 10 | TAL; 32 | RCH; 5 | DAR; 5 | CLT; 20 | DOV; 11 | NSH; 21 | KEN; 17 | MLW; 19 | NHA; 21 | DAY; 13 | CHI; 24 | GTY; 26 | IRP; 10 | CGV; 10 | GLN; 28 | MCH; 38 | BRI; 10 | CAL; 20 | RCH; 17 | DOV; 18 | KAN; 41 | CLT; 32 | MEM; 9 | TEX; 28 | PHO; 33 | HOM; 15 | 14th | 3615 | |
| 2009 | Rusty Wallace Racing | 66 | Chevy | DAY; 42 | CAL; 10 | LVS; 30 | BRI; 7 | TEX; 14 | NSH; 9 | PHO; 12 | TAL; 34 | RCH; 11 | DAR; 14 | CLT; 17 | DOV; 29 | NSH; 7 | KEN; 14 | MLW; 6 | NHA; 11 | DAY; 12 | CHI; 16 | GTY; 24 | IRP; 5 | IOW; 17 | GLN; 12 | MCH; 15 | BRI; 17 | CGV; 16 | ATL; 23 | RCH; 9 | DOV; 12 | KAN; 15 | CAL; 29 | CLT; 31 | MEM; 20 | TEX; 21 | PHO; 10 | HOM; 8 | 7th | 4007 | |
| 2010 | Rusty Wallace Racing | 66 | Toyota | DAY; 10 | CAL; 6 | LVS; 10 | BRI; 38 | NSH; 36 | PHO; 30 | TEX; 9 | TAL; 39 | RCH; 17 | DAR; 12 | DOV; 14 | CLT; 21 | NSH; 8 | KEN; 6 | ROA; 9 | NHA; 11 | DAY; 15 | CHI; 12 | GTY; 5 | IRP; 10 | IOW; 6 | GLN; 9 | MCH; 18 | BRI; 30 | CGV; 38 | ATL; 35 | RCH; 16 | DOV; 12 | KAN; 11 | CAL; 33 | CLT; 29 | GTY; 12 | TEX; 10 | PHO; 10 | HOM; 15 | 10th | 3940 | |
| 2011 | Rusty Wallace Racing | 66 | Toyota | DAY; 20 | PHO; 30 | LVS; 16 | BRI; 11 | CAL; 27 | TEX; 17 | TAL; 32 | NSH; 17 | RCH; 11 | DAR; 5 | DOV; 16 | IOW; 11 | CLT; 7 | CHI; 12 | MCH; 14 | ROA; 26 | DAY; 11 | KEN; 21 | NHA; 9 | NSH; 11 | IRP; 30 | IOW; 8 | GLN; 16 | CGV; 4 | BRI; 14 | ATL; 13 | RCH; 16 | CHI; 18 | DOV; 20 | KAN; 20 | CLT; 13 | TEX; 18 | PHO; 29 | HOM; 34 | | 10th | 921 | |
| 2012 | Rusty Wallace Racing | 4 | Ford | DAY | PHO | LVS | BRI | CAL | TEX | RCH; 11 | TAL | DAR | IOW | CLT | DOV | MCH | ROA | KEN | DAY | NHA | CHI | IND | IOW | GLN | CGV | BRI | ATL | RCH | CHI | KEN | DOV | CLT | KAN | TEX | PHO | HOM | | | 72nd | 33 | |
| 2013 | Rusty Wallace Racing | 66 | Ford | DAY | PHO | LVS | BRI | CAL | TEX | RCH | TAL | DAR | CLT; 25 | DOV | IOW | MCH | ROA | KEN | DAY | NHA | CHI | IND | IOW | GLN | MOH | BRI | ATL | RCH | CHI | KEN | DOV | KAN | CLT | TEX | PHO | HOM | | | 73rd | 19 | |

==== Camping World Truck Series ====
NASCAR Camping World Truck Series results
| Year | Team | No. | Make | 1 | 2 | 3 | 4 | 5 | 6 | 7 | 8 | 9 | 10 | 11 | 12 | 13 | 14 | 15 | 16 | 17 | 18 | 19 | 20 | 21 | 22 | 23 | 24 | 25 | NCWTC | Pts | Ref |
|---|---|---|---|---|---|---|---|---|---|---|---|---|---|---|---|---|---|---|---|---|---|---|---|---|---|---|---|---|---|---|---|
| 2010 | Billy Ballew Motorsports | 15 | Toyota | DAY | ATL; 4 | MAR | NSH; 12 | KAN | DOV | CLT | TEX | MCH | IOW; 30 | GTW; 17 | IRP | POC | NSH | DAR | BRI | CHI | KEN | NHA | LVS | MAR | TAL | TEX | PHO | HOM | 52nd | 477 | |
| 2013 | Adrian Carriers Racing | 97 | Chevy | DAY | MAR | CAR | KAN | CHA | DOV | TEX | KEN | IOW; 17 | ELD | POC | MCH | BRI | MSP | IOW; 18 | CHI | LVS | TAL | MAR | TEX | PHO; 14 | HOM | | | | 96th | 0^{1} | |

^{1} Ineligible for series points

=== ARCA Re/Max Series ===
(key) (Bold – Pole position awarded by qualifying time. Italics – Pole position earned by points standings or practice time. * – Most laps led.)

ARCA Re/Max Series results
| Year | Team | No. | Make | 1 | 2 | 3 | 4 | 5 | 6 | 7 | 8 | 9 | 10 | 11 | 12 | 13 | 14 | 15 | 16 | 17 | 18 | 19 | 20 | 21 | 22 | 23 | ARSC | Pts | Ref |
|---|---|---|---|---|---|---|---|---|---|---|---|---|---|---|---|---|---|---|---|---|---|---|---|---|---|---|---|---|---|
| 2005 | Cunningham Motorsports | 4 | Dodge | DAY | NSH | SLM | KEN | TOL; 7 | LAN | | | | | | | | | | | | | | | CHI; 4 | SLM | TAL | 52nd | 710 | |
| 2005 | Bobby Jones Racing | 88 | Dodge | | | | | | | MIL; 32 | POC | MCH | KAN | KEN | BLN | POC | GTW | LER | NSH | | | | | | | | 52nd | 710 | |
| 2005 | Penske Racing | 27 | Dodge | | | | | | | | | | | | | | | | | MCH; 1* | ISF | TOL | DSF | | | | 52nd | 710 | |
| 2006 | Rusty Wallace Racing | 61 | Dodge | DAY | **NSH**; 10 | SLM | WIN | **KEN**; 1* | TOL | POC | MCH | KAN; 5 | KEN | BLN | POC | GTW; 2* | NSH | MCH; 33* | ISF | MIL | TOL | DSF | **CHI**; 1* | SLM | TAL; 2 | **IOW**; 1* | 27th | 1645 | |
| 2007 | Rusty Wallace Racing | 61 | Dodge | DAY; 39 | USA | NSH | SLM | KAN | WIN | KEN | TOL | IOW | POC | MCH | BLN | KEN | POC | NSH | ISF | MIL | GTW | DSF | CHI | SLM | TAL | TOL | 181st | 35 | |

=== CARS Super Late Model Tour ===
(key)

CARS Super Late Model Tour results
| Year | Team | No. | Make | 1 | 2 | 3 | 4 | 5 | 6 | 7 | 8 | 9 | 10 | 11 | 12 | 13 | CSLMTC | Pts | Ref |
|---|---|---|---|---|---|---|---|---|---|---|---|---|---|---|---|---|---|---|---|
| 2015 | Rusty Wallace Racing | 66 | Ford | SNM; 11 | ROU; 26 | HCY; 12 | SNM; 11 | TCM; 4 | MMS; 23 | ROU; 17 | **CON**; 1** | MYB; 3 | HCY; 21 | | | | 6th | 219 | |
| 2016 | Rusty Wallace Racing | 66 | Ford | SNM | ROU | HCY; 4 | TCM; 4 | GRE | ROU | CON; 7 | MYB; 11 | HCY | SNM | | | | 13th | 107 | |
| 2017 | Rusty Wallace Racing | 66 | Ford | **CON**; 15 | DOM | DOM | HCY | HCY | | | | | ROU; 1 | HCY | CON | SBO | 14th | 81 | |
| 2017 | Rusty Wallace Racing | 66W | Ford | | | | | | BRI; 5 | AND | ROU | TCM | | | | | 14th | 81 | |
| 2018 | Rusty Wallace Racing | 66W | Ford | MYB | NSH; 31 | ROU; 6 | HCY | | | | ROU; 3* | SBO | | | | | 10th | 94 | |
| 2018 | Rusty Wallace Racing | 66 | Ford | | | | | BRI; 18 | AND; 13 | HCY | | | | | | | 10th | 94 | |
| 2019 | Rusty Wallace Racing | 66W | Ford | SNM; 25 | HCY | NSH | MMS | | | | | | | | | | 19th | 56 | |
| 2019 | Rusty Wallace Racing | 66 | Ford | | | | | BRI; 3 | HCY | ROU; 16 | SBO | | | | | | 19th | 56 | |

Achievements
| Preceded by Charlie Bradberry | Snowball Derby Winner; 2004 | Succeeded by Eddie Mercer |
