= 2011 Brickyard 400 =

Race details
- Race 20 of 36 in the 2011 NASCAR Sprint Cup Series
- The 2011 Brickyard 400 program cover, featuring Jamie McMurray.
- Date: July 31, 2011
- Location: Indianapolis Motor Speedway in Indianapolis, Indiana
- Course: Permanent racing facility
- Course length: 2.5 miles (4.0 km)
- Distance: 160 laps, 400 mi (643.73 km)
- Weather: Mostly sunny with a high around 90; wind out of the NNW at 4 mph
- Average speed: 140.762 miles per hour (226.534 km/h)

Pole position
Driver	David Ragan	Roush Fenway Racing
- Time: 49.182

Most laps led
Driver	Kasey Kahne	Red Bull Racing Team
- Laps: 48

Winner
No. 27	Paul Menard	Richard Childress Racing

Television in the United States
- Network: ESPN
- Announcers: Allen Bestwick, Dale Jarrett and Andy Petree

The 2011 Brickyard 400 presented by BigMachineRecords.com, the 18th running of the event, was a NASCAR Sprint Cup Series stock car race held on July 31, 2011, at Indianapolis Motor Speedway in Indianapolis, Indiana. Contested over 160 laps on the 2.5-mile (4.0 km) asphalt rectangular oval, it was the 20th race of the 2011 Sprint Cup Series season.

The race logo used for the 2011 Brickyard 400.

There were five cautions and 22 lead changes among 13 different drivers throughout the course of the race. Paul Menard won his only Cup Series race, driving for Richard Childress Racing, while Jeff Gordon finished second, and Regan Smith clinched third. The result moved Menard to the 14th position in the Drivers' Championship. He remained 53 points behind tenth place driver Dale Earnhardt Jr. and two ahead of Kasey Kahne in fifteenth. Chevrolet maintained its lead in the Manufacturers' Championship, 20 points ahead of Ford and 28 ahead of Toyota, with 16 races remaining in the season. A total of 138,000 people attended the race, while 6.4 million watched it live on television.

== Report ==
=== Background ===
Indianapolis Motor Speedway, the race track where the race was held.

Indianapolis Motor Speedway is one of six superspeedways to hold NASCAR races, the others being Michigan International Speedway, Auto Club Speedway, Daytona International Speedway, Pocono Raceway and Talladega Superspeedway. The standard track at Indianapolis Motor Speedway is a four-turn rectangular-oval track that is 2.5 miles (4.0 km) long. The track's turns are banked at 9 degrees, while the front stretch, the location of the finish line, has no banking. The back stretch, opposite of the front, also has none. The racetrack has seats for 250,000 spectators.

Before the race, Carl Edwards led the Drivers' Championship with 652 points, and Jimmie Johnson stood in second with 645. Kurt Busch was third in the Drivers' Championship with 641 points, four ahead of Kevin Harvick and nine ahead of Kyle Busch in fourth and fifth. Matt Kenseth with 626 was 39 ahead of Jeff Gordon, as Ryan Newman with 586 points, was nine ahead of Dale Earnhardt Jr., and 16 in front of Denny Hamlin. In the Manufacturers' Championship, Chevrolet was leading with 127 points, 17 ahead of Ford. Toyota, with 105 points, was 29 points ahead of Dodge in the battle for third. Jamie McMurray was the defending winner of the race.

=== Practice and qualifying ===
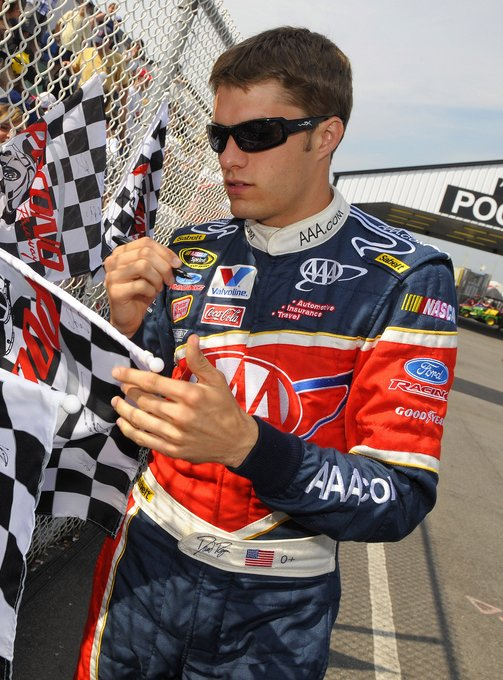
David Ragan recorded his second pole position with a fastest time of 49.182 seconds

Three practice sessions were held before the race; the first two on Friday, both lasting 75 minutes. The third practice session was held on Saturday, and lasted 90 minutes. Kenseth was quickest with a time of 49.668 seconds in the first session, around seven thousandths of a second faster than second place Kasey Kahne. Hamlin followed in third place ahead of Edwards, David Ragan, and Kurt Busch. Juan Pablo Montoya was seventh, still within a second of Kenseth's time.

In the second practice session, Greg Biffle was fastest with a time of 50.474 seconds, less than four-hundredths of a second quicker than second-placed Martin Truex Jr. Johnson took third place, ahead of Casey Mears, Harvick and Edwards. Kenseth was only quick enough for the 29th position. Also during the second session, Hamlin's engine failed, prompting the session to halt with three minutes remaining. In the third and final practice, Biffle remained quickest with a time of 49.297 seconds. Kahne followed in second, ahead of Kurt Busch and Ragan. Edwards was fifth quickest, with a time of 49.583 seconds. Montoya, A. J. Allmendinger, Kenseth, Brian Vickers, and Johnson rounded out the first ten positions.

Forty-eight drivers were entered for qualifying, but only forty-three could qualify for the race because of NASCAR's qualifying procedure. Ragan clinched the second pole position of his career, with a time of 49.182 seconds. He was joined on the front row of the grid by Kahne. Johnson qualified third, Kurt Busch took fourth, and Brad Keselowski started fifth. Allmendinger, Montoya, Gordon, Kenseth and Edwards rounded out the top ten. The five drivers who failed to qualify for the race were David Stremme, Travis Kvapil, Erik Darnell, J. J. Yeley, and Scott Wimmer. Following the conclusion of the session, Ragan commented, "We're working as hard as we ever have. It's finally just showing. We've always had a lot of confidence in our team. The last couple years we've really underperformed. That has not been a secret."

=== Race ===
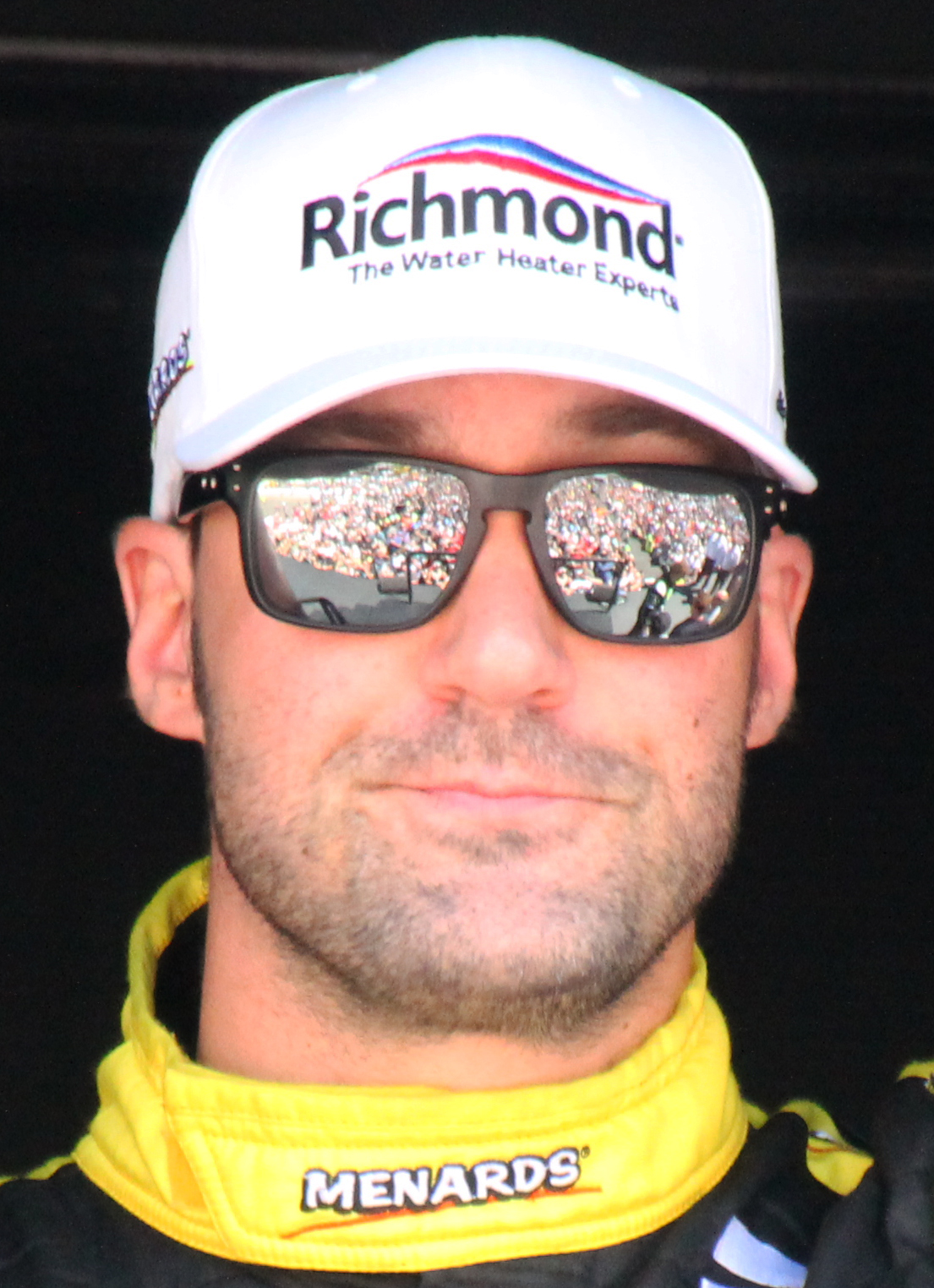
Paul Menard won the race.

The race, the 20th in the season, began at 1:00 pm EDT and was televised live in the United States on ESPN. Weather conditions were dry before the race, the air temperature at 80 °F (27 °C); clear skies were expected. Representative Howard Brammer began pre-race ceremonies, by giving the invocation. Next, Rascal Flatts performed the national anthem, and Mari Hulman George gave the command for drivers to start their engines.

Ragan retained his pole position lead into the first corner, followed by Kahne, who started second. Kahne managed to take first before the conclusion of the first lap. Two laps later, Allmendinger moved up to third. On the sixth lap of the race, Trevor Bayne was forced to go to the pit lane after overheating. After starting eighth on the grid, Gordon had moved up to fourth, as Kurt Busch fell to seventh. By the 11th lap of the race, Kahne had extended his lead to three seconds over Ragan. Three laps later, Gordon moved into the second position. By lap 17, Kahne had extended his lead to 4.5 seconds. On the 22nd lap, Kenseth passed Allmendinger for fourth. After 25 laps, Allmendinger and Kahne made pit stops, two laps before Kurt Busch. Everyone had made pit stops by the 30th lap of the race, which moved Kahne back into first.

Four laps later, the first caution was given because of debris on the racing surface. Most of the front runners made pit stops, except Kahne and Gordon. At the restart on the 38th lap, Kahne was the leader ahead of Gordon and Johnson. By the 42nd lap, Gordon had passed Kahne and expanded his lead to 1.3 seconds. On the following lap, Hamlin moved up to fifth, as Kenseth took over seventh. On lap 45, Earnhardt Jr. made a pit stops to remove grass from his front grille. Five laps later, the second caution was given after David Reutimann collided into the wall. All of the front runners made pit stops during the caution, as Earnhardt Jr. became the leader. On the 57th lap, Kenseth and Johnson passed Kyle Busch for fourth and fifth place respectively. On the following lap, Gordon moved up to second after overtaking Ragan. Gordon passed Earnhardt Jr. to become the leader on the 60th lap.

Four laps later, Kahne moved up to fourth. On lap 68, Johnson passed teammate Earnhardt Jr. to take second. On the 72nd lap, Jamie McMurray made a pit stop for some adjustments. On the next lap, Keselowski made a pit stop, three laps before Tony Stewart. While making a pit stop, Stewart had to do a pass through penalty for going faster than the proposed speed on pit road. After everyone made pit stops, Gordon reclaimed the lead on lap 84. Ten laps later, debris on the track prompted the third caution. Most of the leaders made pit stops during the caution. At the restart on lap 97, Paul Menard was the leader, ahead of Kenseth and Ragan. On the 101st lap, Kahne took sixth from Hamlin, as Menard remained the leader. Six laps later, Kenseth passed Menard to become the leader. On the 108th lap, Montoya moved up to third, as Johnson moved up to 11th. On lap 114, the fourth caution was given after Kyle Busch collided into the wall. Most of the front runners made pit stops during the caution, while Keselowski did not.

At the restart on lap 117, Keselowski was the leader. On the following lap, Montoya moved up to third, as Marcos Ambrose received a drive-through penalty after switching lanes before the start, finish line. On the 120th lap, Landon Cassill spun sideways, prompting the fifth caution to be given. None of the front runners made pit stops during the caution. Keselowski continued to lead on the lap 126 restart, as Clint Bowyer moved into second. On the 130th lap, Jeff Burton made a pit stop, as Gordon overtook Kenseth for fourth. On the following lap, Johnson made a pit stop, one lap before Keselowski, Montoya and Kahne. At lap 133, Earnhardt Jr. and Joey Logano made a pit stop, a lap before Bowyer, and two laps before Gordon. Afterwards, Ragan made a pit stop, moving Stewart into first. By lap 140, Stewart had a four-second lead over second placed Brian Vickers.

Six laps later, Stewart made a pit stop for fuel, moving Menard into first. With ten laps remaining, Trevor Bayne moved up to tenth, three laps before McMurray became the leader as Menard was saving fuel. By the 155th lap, Gordon had moved up to fifth, as the drivers in front of him were at a slower pace from trying to get better fuel mileage. With three laps remaining, Menard reclaimed first from McMurray, as Gordon moved up to third. On the final lap, Gordon moved into second, and Menard crossed the finish line first to score his first Sprint Cup Series victory. Gordon was second, ahead of Regan Smith, McMurray, and Kenseth.

=== Post-race ===
"My first year here was 1989, that I can remember anyway. I think I was here when I was 3 or 4 years old, too. I just spent a lot of time in the garage area. I didn't miss an Indy 500 from 1989 to 2003. I was here for the inaugural Brickyard 400 in 1994. It's just a really special place for my family and myself.

— Paul Menard, speaking after the race.

Menard appeared in victory lane after his victory lap to start celebrating his first win of his career, in front of a crowd of 138,000 people. Jeff Gordon said of Menard's first victory: "I went and saw him. His eyes, he's like a deer in headlights. I'm so happy for him. It's one thing to get your first win here, but it's another when you can appreciate how special it is to win here. I think Paul certainly has that."

Although Stewart was leading the race near the end, he had to pit for fuel. Stewart, who finished sixth, said, "I'm really happy for Paul Menard. Paul's been around this place for a long time, been here since he was a kid. It couldn't have happened to a better guy. It's a pretty deserving win right there. I'm happy for him." In the subsequent press conference, Gordon stated his happiness for Menard by saying, "Just because he's been here so much as a kid experiencing Indy, he knows how special it is to compete here, let alone win here. So I think the feelings are probably very similar. He probably has a greater appreciation for it than I did in '94, because while I was watching from a distance and my heroes were Indy 500 drivers, I wasn't in the garage like he was."

Smith also commented, "I just know what it means to Paul. I know how hard he's worked. He always talks about coming up here. He always talks about how much he loves this place. I know if he had to highlight one race to get his first win, I'm sure he'd tell you in a minute he couldn't be happier. You only get one chance to get your first win. It's a special thing, especially when you do it here." The race result moved Menard up five positions to 14th in the Driver's Championship with 553 points, 53 points behind tenth. Edwards, who finished fourteenth in the race, remained first in the standings, as Johnson followed in second. Harvick followed in third ahead of Kyle Busch and Kenseth. Chevrolet maintained their lead in the Manufacturers' Championship with 136 points. Ford and Toyota placed second and third with 116 and 108 points, while Dodge was fourth with 80. 6.4 million people watched the event live on television. The race took two hours, fifty minutes and thirty seconds to complete, and the margin of victory was 0.725 seconds,

== Results ==
=== Qualifying ===
Grid	No.	Driver	Team	Manufacturer	Time	Speed
1	6	David Ragan	Roush Fenway Racing	Ford	49.182	182.994
2	4	Kasey Kahne	Red Bull Racing Team	Toyota	49.200	182.927
3	48	Jimmie Johnson	Hendrick Motorsports	Chevrolet	49.234	182.801
4	22	Kurt Busch	Penske Racing	Dodge	49.269	182.671
5	2	Brad Keselowski	Penske Racing	Dodge	49.300	182.556
6	43	A. J. Allmendinger	Richard Petty Motorsports	Ford	49.330	182.445
7	42	Juan Pablo Montoya	Earnhardt Ganassi Racing	Chevrolet	49.351	182.367
8	24	Jeff Gordon	Hendrick Motorsports	Chevrolet	49.385	182.242
9	17	Matt Kenseth	Roush Fenway Racing	Ford	49.392	182.216
10	99	Carl Edwards	Roush Fenway Racing	Ford	49.437	182.050
11	13	Casey Mears	Germain Racing	Toyota	49.444	182.024
12	5	Mark Martin	Hendrick Motorsports	Chevrolet	49.459	181.969
13	31	Jeff Burton	Richard Childress Racing	Chevrolet	49.479	181.895
14	11	Denny Hamlin	Joe Gibbs Racing	Toyota	49.480	181.892
15	27	Paul Menard	Richard Childress Racing	Chevrolet	49.486	181.870
16	1	Jamie McMurray	Earnhardt Ganassi Racing	Chevrolet	49.492	181.848
17	47	Bobby Labonte	JTG Daugherty Racing	Toyota	49.528	181.715
18	16	Greg Biffle	Roush Fenway Racing	Ford	49.537	181.422
19	29	Kevin Harvick	Richard Childress Racing	Chevrolet	49.550	181.635
20	20	Joey Logano	Joe Gibbs Racing	Toyota	49.608	181.422
21	9	Marcos Ambrose	Richard Petty Motorsports	Ford	49.617	181.389
22	88	Dale Earnhardt Jr.	Hendrick Motorsports	Chevrolet	49.632	181.335
23	39	Ryan Newman	Stewart–Haas Racing	Chevrolet	49.636	181.320
24	14	Tony Stewart	Stewart–Haas Racing	Chevrolet	49.655	181.251
25	21	Trevor Bayne	Wood Brothers Racing	Ford	49.687	181.134
26	33	Clint Bowyer	Richard Childress Racing	Chevrolet	49.729	180.981
27	78	Regan Smith	Furniture Row Racing	Chevrolet	49.744	180.926
28	00	David Reutimann	Michael Waltrip Racing	Toyota	49.748	180.912
29	18	Kyle Busch	Joe Gibbs Racing	Toyota	49.764	180.854
30	56	Martin Truex Jr.	Michael Waltrip Racing	Toyota	49.829	180.618
31	83	Brian Vickers	Red Bull Racing Team	Toyota	49.831	180.611
32	51	Landon Cassill	Phoenix Racing	Chevrolet	49.963	180.133
33	36	Dave Blaney	Tommy Baldwin Racing	Chevrolet	50.021	179.924
34	37	Scott Speed	Max Q Motorsports	Ford	50.126	179.451
35	66	Michael McDowell	HP Racing	Toyota	50.153	179.451
36	87	Joe Nemechek	NEMCO Motorsports	Toyota	50.196	179.297
37	34	David Gilliland	Front Row Motorsports	Ford	50.202	179.276
38	60	Mike Skinner	Germain Racing	Toyota	50.282	178.990
39	71	Andy Lally	TRG Motorsports	Ford	50.300	178.926
40	50	T. J. Bell	LTD Powersports	Chevrolet	50.564	177.992
41	7	Robby Gordon	Robby Gordon Motorsports	Dodge	50.600	177.866
42	32	Mike Bliss	FAS Lane Racing	Ford	50.601	177.862
43	23	Terry Labonte(P)	FAS Lane Racing	Ford	51.577	174.496
	Failed to Qualify					
	30	David Stremme	Inception Motorsports	Chevrolet	50.579	177.939
	38	Travis Kvapil	Front Row Motorsports	Ford	50.729	177.413
	46	Erik Darnell	Whitney Motorsports	Ford	50.734	177.396
	55	J. J. Yeley	Front Row Motorsports	Ford	51.009	176.439
	77	Scott Wimmer	Robby Gordon Motorsports	Dodge	51.415	175.046
	Source:					

=== Race results ===
Pos	Car	Driver	Team	Manufacturer	Laps	Points
1	27	Paul Menard	Richard Childress Racing	Chevrolet	160	47^{1}^{3}
2	24	Jeff Gordon	Hendrick Motorsports	Chevrolet	160	43^{1}
3	78	Regan Smith	Furniture Row Racing	Chevrolet	160	41
4	1	Jamie McMurray	Earnhardt Ganassi Racing	Chevrolet	160	41^{1}
5	17	Matt Kenseth	Roush Fenway Racing	Ford	160	40^{1}
6	14	Tony Stewart	Stewart–Haas Racing	Chevrolet	160	39^{1}
7	16	Greg Biffle	Roush Fenway Racing	Ford	160	37
8	5	Mark Martin	Hendrick Motorsports	Chevrolet	160	36
9	2	Brad Keselowski	Penske Racing	Dodge	160	36^{1}
10	18	Kyle Busch	Joe Gibbs Racing	Toyota	160	34
11	29	Kevin Harvick	Richard Childress Racing	Chevrolet	160	33
12	39	Ryan Newman	Stewart–Haas Racing	Chevrolet	160	32
13	33	Clint Bowyer	Richard Childress Racing	Chevrolet	160	32^{1}
14	99	Carl Edwards	Roush Fenway Racing	Ford	160	30
15	83	Brian Vickers	Red Bull Racing Team	Toyota	160	29
16	88	Dale Earnhardt Jr.	Hendrick Motorsports	Chevrolet	160	29^{1}
17	47	Bobby Labonte	JTG Daugherty Racing	Toyota	160	27
18	4	Kasey Kahne	Red Bull Racing Team	Toyota	160	28^{2}
19	48	Jimmie Johnson	Hendrick Motorsports	Chevrolet	160	26^{1}
20	51	Landon Cassill	Phoenix Racing	Chevrolet	160	0^{4}
21	22	Kurt Busch	Penske Racing	Dodge	160	23
22	43	A. J. Allmendinger	Richard Petty Motorsports	Ford	160	22
23	6	David Ragan	Roush Fenway Racing	Ford	160	22^{1}
24	56	Martin Truex Jr.	Michael Waltrip Racing	Toyota	160	20
25	20	Joey Logano	Joe Gibbs Racing	Toyota	160	19
26	71	Andy Lally	TRG Motorsports	Ford	160	18
27	11	Denny Hamlin	Joe Gibbs Racing	Toyota	160	17
28	42	Juan Pablo Montoya	Earnhardt Ganassi Racing	Chevrolet	160	16
29	13	Casey Mears	Germain Racing	Toyota	160	15
30	21	Trevor Bayne	Wood Brothers Racing	Ford	160	0^{4}
31	36	Dave Blaney	Tommy Baldwin Racing	Chevrolet	160	14^{1}
32	32	Mike Bliss	FAS Lane Racing	Ford	160	0^{4}
33	34	David Gilliland	Front Row Motorsports	Ford	157	11
34	9	Marcos Ambrose	Richard Petty Motorsports	Ford	157	10
35	31	Jeff Burton	Richard Childress Racing	Chevrolet	153	9
36	00	David Reutimann	Michael Waltrip Racing	Toyota	49	8
37	66	Michael McDowell	HP Racing	Toyota	23	7
38	87	Joe Nemechek	NEMCO Motorsports	Toyota	19	0^{4}
39	37	Scott Speed	Front Row Motorsports	Ford	19	0^{4}
40	60	Mike Skinner	Germain Racing	Toyota	16	0^{4}
41	23	Terry Labonte	FAS Lane Racing	Ford	15	3
42	50	T. J. Bell	LTD Powersports	Chevrolet	10	0^{4}
43	7	Robby Gordon	Robby Gordon Motorsports	Dodge	5	1
^{1} Includes one bonus point for leading a lap
^{2} Includes two bonus points for leading the most laps
^{3} Includes three bonus points for winning the race
^{4} Ineligible for championship points

== Standings after the race ==
Drivers' Championship standings

Pos	Driver	Points
1	Carl Edwards	682
2	Jimmie Johnson	671
3	Kevin Harvick	670
4	Kyle Busch	666
5	Matt Kenseth	666

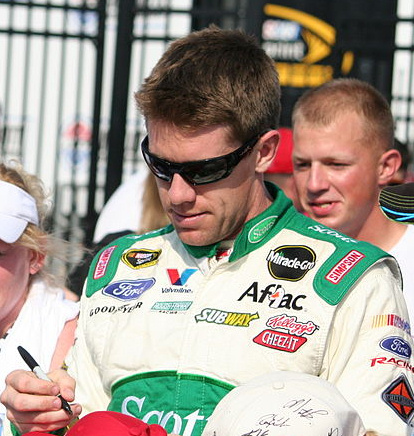
Carl Edwards led the Drivers' Championship standings after the race with 682 points.

Manufacturers' Championship standings

Pos	Manufacturer	Points
1	Chevrolet	136
2	Ford	116
3	Toyota	108
4	Dodge	80

- Note: Only the top five positions are included for the driver standings.

Previous race: 2011 Lenox Industrial Tools 301	Sprint Cup Series; 2011 season	Next race: 2011 Good Sam RV Insurance 500
