= 2011 Lenox Industrial Tools 301 =

Race details
- Race 19 of 36 in the 2011 NASCAR Sprint Cup Series
- Date: July 17, 2011
- Official name: Lenox Industrial Tools 301
- Location: New Hampshire Motor Speedway in Loudon, New Hampshire.
- Course: Permanent racing facility
- Course length: 1.058 miles (1.703 km)
- Distance: 301 laps, 318.5 mi (512.6 km)
- Weather: Mostly sunny with high around 86; wind out of the WSW at 3 mph.
- Average speed: 104.1 miles per hour (167.5 km/h)

Pole position
Driver	Ryan Newman	Stewart–Haas Racing
- Time: 28.165

Most laps led
Driver	Ryan Newman	Stewart–Haas Racing
- Laps: 119

Winner
No. 39	Ryan Newman	Stewart–Haas Racing

Television in the United States
- Network: Turner Network Television
- Announcers: Adam Alexander, Wally Dallenbach Jr. and Kyle Petty

The 2011 Lenox Industrial Tools 301 was a NASCAR Sprint Cup Series motor race held on July 17, 2011, at New Hampshire Motor Speedway in Loudon, New Hampshire. Contested over 301 laps on the 1.058-mile (1.703 km) asphalt oval, it was the 19th race of the 2011 Sprint Cup Series season. The race was won by Ryan Newman of Stewart–Haas Racing, his first win of 2011. Newman's teammate and owner, Tony Stewart finished second and Denny Hamlin clinched third.

There were 10 cautions and 21 lead changes among 14 different drivers throughout the race. Following the race, Carl Edwards led the Drivers' Championship with 652 points, seven ahead of Jimmie Johnson and eleven points ahead of Kurt Busch. Chevrolet led the Manufacturer Championship with 127 points, 17 ahead of Ford and 22 ahead of Toyota. A total of 95,000 people attended the race, while 4.6 million watched it on television.

== Report ==
=== Background ===
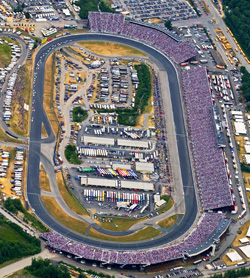
New Hampshire Motor Speedway, the race track where the race was held.

New Hampshire Motor Speedway is one of ten intermediate tracks to hold NASCAR races. The standard track at New Hampshire Motor Speedway is a four-turn oval track, 1.058 miles (1.703 km) long. The track's turns are banked at two to seven degrees, while the front stretch, the finish line, and the back stretch are banked at one degree.

Before the race, Kyle Busch led the Drivers' Championship with 624 points, and Carl Edwards stood in second with 620. Kevin Harvick was third in the Drivers' Championship with 614 points, eight ahead of Kurt Busch and nine ahead of Jimmie Johnson in fourth and fifth. Matt Kenseth with 602 was 49 ahead of Dale Earnhardt Jr., as Ryan Newman with 538 points, was nine ahead of Denny Hamlin, and eleven in front of Tony Stewart. In the Manufacturers' Championship, Chevrolet was leading with 118 points, 12 ahead of Ford. Toyota, with 99 points, was 27 points ahead of Dodge in the battle for third.

=== Practice and qualifying ===
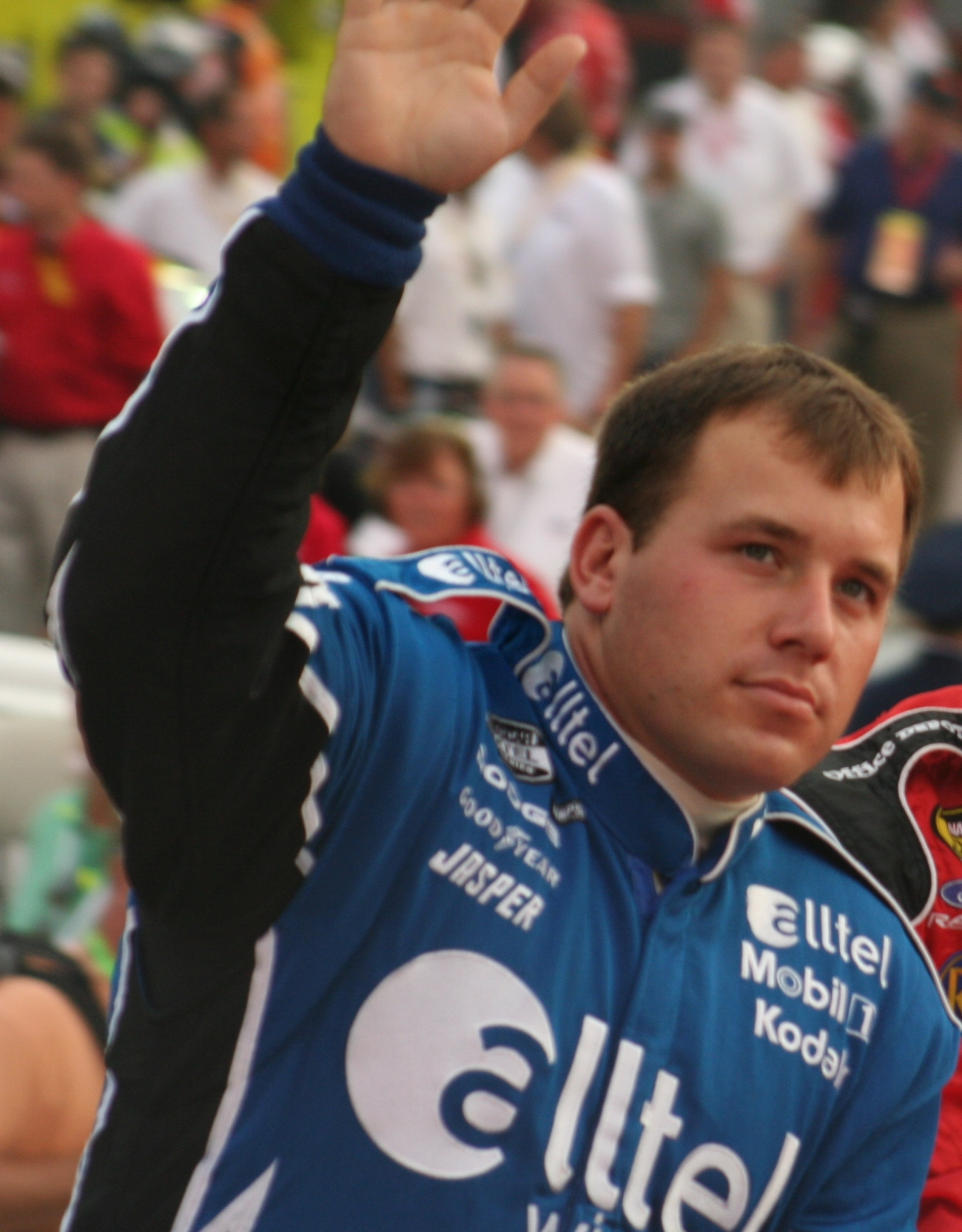
Ryan Newman won the pole position with a fastest time of 28.165

Three practice sessions are scheduled before the race; the first on Friday, which lasted 90 minutes. The second and third were both on Saturday afternoon, lasting 60 minutes each. Clint Bowyer was quickest with a time of 28.379 seconds in the first session, around two hundredths seconds faster than Stewart. Newman was just off Stewart's pace, followed by A. J. Allmendinger, Paul Menard, and Kurt Busch. Regan Smith was seventh, still within a second of Bowyer's time.

Forty-six cars were entered for qualifying, but only forty-three could qualify for the race because of NASCAR's qualifying procedure. Newman clinched the 47th pole position of his career, with a record time of 28.165 seconds. He was joined on the front row of the grid by Stewart. David Reutimann qualified third, Kurt Busch took fourth, and Brad Keselowski started fifth. Jeff Burton, Gordon, Juan Pablo Montoya, Menard and Kasey Kahne rounded out the top ten. The three drivers that failed to qualify for the race were Tony Raines, Scott Riggs, and Dennis Setzer. Once the qualifying session completed, Newman commented, "This has been a track that's been really good for me for firsts and I'm looking for that first win again. It's extremely important here to start up front, it's a big track-position race, it's a relatively short race if you look at the mileage and the way the fuel stops work out. We've got a good start, we just need to have a good finish for the team. I want to get that victory on Sunday, that’s what I’m thinking about."

In the second practice session, Stewart was fastest with a time of 29.487 seconds, less than five-thousandths of a second quicker than second-placed Bowyer. Keselowski took third place, ahead of Gordon, Martin Truex Jr. and Hamlin. Burton was only quick enough for the seventh position. In the third and final practice, Johnson was quickest with a time of 29.391 seconds. Montoya followed in second, ahead of Newman and Burton. Keselowski was fifth quickest, with a time of 29.490 seconds. Joey Logano, Brian Vickers, Truex, Hamlin, and Kurt Busch rounded out the first ten positions.

=== Race ===
The race, the 19th in the season, began at 1:00 p.m. EDT and was televised live in the United States on TNT. The conditions on the grid were dry before the race, the air temperature at 71 °F (22 °C); clear skies were expected.

== Results ==
=== Qualifying ===
Grid	No.	Driver	Team	Manufacturer	Time	Speed
1	39	Ryan Newman	Stewart–Haas Racing	Chevrolet	28.165	135.232
2	14	Tony Stewart	Stewart–Haas Racing	Chevrolet	28.200	135.064
3	00	David Reutimann	Michael Waltrip Racing	Toyota	28.263	134.763
4	22	Kurt Busch	Penske Racing	Dodge	28.352	134.340
5	2	Brad Keselowski	Penske Racing	Dodge	28.392	134.150
6	31	Jeff Burton	Richard Childress Racing	Chevrolet	28.398	134.122
7	24	Jeff Gordon	Hendrick Motorsports	Chevrolet	28.408	134.075
8	42	Juan Pablo Montoya	Earnhardt Ganassi Racing	Chevrolet	28.469	133.788
9	27	Paul Menard	Richard Childress Racing	Chevrolet	28.471	133.778
10	4	Kasey Kahne	Red Bull Racing Team	Toyota	28.476	133.755
11	78	Regan Smith	Furniture Row Racing	Chevrolet	28.484	133.717
12	33	Clint Bowyer	Richard Childress Racing	Chevrolet	28.510	133.595
13	56	Martin Truex Jr.	Michael Waltrip Racing	Toyota	28.541	133.450
14	11	Denny Hamlin	Joe Gibbs Racing	Toyota	28.545	133.431
15	99	Carl Edwards	Roush Fenway Racing	Ford	28.550	133.408
16	20	Joey Logano	Joe Gibbs Racing	Toyota	28.560	133.361
17	43	A. J. Allmendinger	Richard Petty Motorsports	Ford	28.613	133.114
18	29	Kevin Harvick	Richard Childress Racing	Chevrolet	28.617	133.096
19	18	Kyle Busch	Joe Gibbs Racing	Toyota	28.632	133.026
20	16	Greg Biffle	Roush Fenway Racing	Ford	28.639	132.993
21	83	Brian Vickers	Red Bull Racing Team	Toyota	28.651	132.938
22	9	Marcos Ambrose	Richard Petty Motorsports	Ford	28.658	132.905
23	47	Bobby Labonte	JTG Daugherty Racing	Toyota	28.671	132.845
24	5	Mark Martin	Hendrick Motorsports	Chevrolet	28.697	132.725
25	1	Jamie McMurray	Earnhardt Ganassi Racing	Chevrolet	28.702	132.702
26	6	David Ragan	Roush Fenway Racing	Ford	28.710	132.665
27	88	Dale Earnhardt Jr.	Hendrick Motorsports	Chevrolet	28.739	132.531
28	48	Jimmie Johnson	Hendrick Motorsports	Chevrolet	28.767	132.402
29	30	David Stremme	Inception Motorsports	Chevrolet	28.804	132.232
30	17	Matt Kenseth	Roush Fenway Racing	Ford	28.826	132.131
31	13	Casey Mears	Germain Racing	Toyota	28.827	132.126
32	51	Landon Cassill	Phoenix Racing	Chevrolet	28.879	131.888
33	66	Michael McDowell	HP Racing	Toyota	28.985	131.406
34	34	David Gilliland	Front Row Motorsports	Ford	28.986	131.401
35	87	Joe Nemechek	NEMCO Motorsports	Toyota	29.007	131.306
36	55	Jeff Green	Front Row Motorsports	Ford	29.036	131.175
37	36	Dave Blaney	Tommy Baldwin Racing	Chevrolet	29.080	130.977
38	38	J. J. Yeley	Front Row Motorsports	Ford	29.086	130.950
39	60	Mike Skinner	Germain Racing	Toyota	29.128	130.761
40	46	Eric Darnell	Whitney Motorsports	Chevrolet	29.257	130.184
41	32	Mike Bliss	FAS Lane Racing	Ford	29.303	129.980
42	7	Scott Wimmer	Robby Gordon Motorsports	Dodge	29.694	128.268
43	71	Andy Lally	TRG Motorsports	Ford	29.318	129.913
Failed to Qualify
	37	Tony Raines	Front Row Motorsports	Ford	29.368	129.692
	81	Scott Riggs	Whitney Motorsports	Chevrolet	29.499	129.116
	92	Dennis Setzer	K-Automotive Motorsports	Chevrolet	29.521	129.020

=== Race results ===
Pos	Car	Driver	Team	Manufacturer	Laps Run	Points
1	39	Ryan Newman	Stewart–Haas Racing	Chevrolet	301	48
2	14	Tony Stewart	Stewart–Haas Racing	Chevrolet	301	43
3	11	Denny Hamlin	Joe Gibbs Racing	Toyota	301	41
4	20	Joey Logano	Joe Gibbs Racing	Toyota	301	41
5	48	Jimmie Johnson	Hendrick Motorsports	Chevrolet	301	40
6	4	Kasey Kahne	Red Bull Racing Team	Toyota	301	39
7	47	Bobby Labonte	JTG Daugherty Racing	Toyota	301	37
8	56	Martin Truex Jr.	Michael Waltrip Racing	Toyota	301	36
9	9	Marcos Ambrose	Richard Petty Motorsports	Ford	301	36
10	22	Kurt Busch	Penske Racing	Dodge	301	35
11	24	Jeff Gordon	Hendrick Motorsports	Chevrolet	301	34
12	43	A. J. Allmendinger	Richard Petty Motorsports	Ford	301	32
13	99	Carl Edwards	Roush Fenway Racing	Ford	301	32
14	6	David Ragan	Roush Fenway Racing	Ford	301	30
15	88	Dale Earnhardt Jr.	Hendrick Motorsports	Chevrolet	301	29
16	31	Jeff Burton	Richard Childress Racing	Chevrolet	301	28
17	33	Clint Bowyer	Richard Childress Racing	Chevrolet	301	28
18	16	Greg Biffle	Roush Fenway Racing	Ford	301	27
19	00	David Reutimann	Michael Waltrip Racing	Toyota	301	25
20	17	Matt Kenseth	Roush Fenway Racing	Ford	301	24
21	29	Kevin Harvick	Richard Childress Racing	Chevrolet	301	23
22	5	Mark Martin	Hendrick Motorsports	Chevrolet	301	23
23	38	J. J. Yeley	Front Row Motorsports	Ford	301	21
24	27	Paul Menard	Richard Childress Racing	Chevrolet	301	20
25	34	David Gilliland	Front Row Motorsports	Ford	301	19
26	51	Landon Cassill	Phoenix Racing	Chevrolet	300	0
27	7	Scott Wimmer	Robby Gordon Motorsports	Dodge	300	0
28	71	Andy Lally	TRG Motorsports	Ford	300	17
29	36	Dave Blaney	Tommy Baldwin Racing	Chevrolet	300	15
30	42	Juan Pablo Montoya	Earnhardt Ganassi Racing	Chevrolet	300	14
31	1	Jamie McMurray	Earnhardt Ganassi Racing	Chevrolet	300	14
32	32	Mike Bliss	FAS Lane Racing	Ford	299	0
33	78	Regan Smith	Furniture Row Racing	Chevrolet	298	11
34	83	Brian Vickers	Red Bull Racing Team	Toyota	283	10
35	2	Brad Keselowski	Penske Racing	Dodge	257	9
36	18	Kyle Busch	Joe Gibbs Racing	Toyota	224	8
37	30	David Stremme	Inception Motorsports	Chevrolet	159	0
38	13	Casey Mears	Germain Racing	Toyota	83	6
39	46	Erik Darnell	Whitney Motorsports	Chevrolet	72	0
40	66	Michael McDowell	HP Racing	Toyota	46	4
41	87	Joe Nemechek	NEMCO Motorsports	Toyota	37	0
42	60	Mike Skinner	Germain Racing	Toyota	17	0
43	55	Jeff Green	Front Row Motorsports	Ford	11	0

== Standings after the race ==
Drivers' Championship standings

Pos	Driver	Points
1	Carl Edwards	652
2	Jimmie Johnson	645
3	Kurt Busch	641
4	Kevin Harvick	637
5	Kyle Busch	632

Manufacturers' Championship standings

Pos	Manufacturer	Points
1	Chevrolet	127
2	Ford	110
3	Toyota	105
4	Dodge	76

- Note: Only the top five positions are included for the driver standings.

Previous race: 2011 Quaker State 400	Sprint Cup Series; 2011 season	Next race: 2011 Brickyard 400
