= Caitlin Shaw =

American racing driver (born 1989)

- Born: August 28, 1989 (age 37); Albuquerque, New Mexico, U.S.

NASCAR FedEx Freight Truck Series career
- 2 races run over 2 years
- Best finish: 88th (2009)
- First race: 2009 AAA Insurance 200 (LOR)
- Last race: 2010 Lucas Oil 150 (Phoenix)
Wins	Top tens	Poles
0	0	0

Caitlin Shaw (born August 28, 1989) is an American professional stock car racing driver.

Shaw is the second youngest woman to compete in NASCAR's top three series (behind Johanna Robbins). She is also the only woman from the state of New Mexico to ever compete in any of NASCAR's top three series. Shaw was the inaugural United States Spokeswoman for the International Online Magazine GirlRacer.co.uk. She continues to promote women in sports by visiting multiple children's hospitals, schools, and seminars talking with children about the power of sport.

== Racing career ==
=== Early career ===
Shaw's early career began in 1999 when she began competing in the Quarter Midget's of America organization. Shaw transitioned into the USAC (United States Auto Club) ranks beginning in the Ford Focus Midget Series where she was Sportsman of the Year and competed in events coast to coast. In 2008, Shaw gained speed in her career as she was offered her first NASCAR Camping World Truck Series Test with Toyota Racing Development's Germain Racing. Shaw tested alongside A. J. Allmendinger, Todd Bodine, and Chrissy Wallace. Later that year Shaw tested at Richmond International Raceway with another Toyota Racing Development team, Red Horse Racing.

=== NASCAR Camping World Truck Series ===
Shaw competed in the NASCAR Whelen All American Series in the spring of 2009 accumulating several top-ten finishes. In July 2009, Shaw was the only woman on the track as she made her NASCAR Camping World Truck Series debut at O'Reilly Raceway Park. Shaw completed the race in the 24th position.

Shaw continued her NCWTS career in November 2010 racing at Phoenix International Raceway for DGM Racing.

== Personal life ==
Her hometown is in Albuquerque, New Mexico. Shaw is a student at Belmont Abbey College in North Carolina pursuing a degree in Marketing. She is currently working part-time at Michael Waltrip Racing, working in their Communications and Marketing departments.

== Motorsports career results ==
=== NASCAR ===
(key) (Bold – Pole position awarded by qualifying time. Italics – Pole position earned by points standings or practice time. * – Most laps led.)

==== Camping World Truck Series ====
NASCAR Camping World Truck Series results
Year	Team	No.	Make	1	2	3	4	5	6	7	8	9	10	11	12	13	14	15	16	17	18	19	20	21	22	23	24	25	NCWTC	Pts	Ref
2009	Red Horse Racing	1	Toyota	DAY	CAL	ATL	MAR	KAN	CLT	DOV	TEX	MCH	MLW	MEM	KEN	IRP; 24	NSH	BRI	CHI	IOW	GTW	NHA	LVS	MAR	TAL	TEX	PHO	HOM	88th	91	
2010	DGM Racing	72	Chevy	DAY	ATL	MAR	NSH	KAN	DOV	CLT	TEX	MCH	IOW	GTY	IRP	POC	NSH	DAR	BRI	CHI	KEN	NHA	LVS	MAR	TAL	TEX	PHO; 30	HOM	112th	173	
