= Marc Mitchell (racing driver) =

American racing driver (born 1983)

- Born: September 3, 1983 (age 43); Tallahassee, Florida, U.S.
- Achievements: 2001 Legend Car World Finals champion

NASCAR O'Reilly Auto Parts Series career
- 4 races run over 2 years
- Best finish: 113th (2007)
- First race: 2005 Federated Auto Parts 300 (Nashville)
- Last race: 2007 RoadLoans.com 200 (Dover)
Wins	Top tens	Poles
0	0	0

NASCAR FedEx Freight Truck Series career
- 19 races run over 3 years
- Best finish: 27th (2008)
- First race: 2007 Mountain Dew 250 (Talladega)
- Last race: 2009 WinStar World Casino 350 (Texas)
Wins	Top tens	Poles
0	1	0

Marc Mitchell (born September 3, 1983) is an American former stock car racing driver. Mitchell competed in the NASCAR Busch Series and the NASCAR Camping World Truck Series. Mitchell was the 2001 Legend Car World Finals champion. He made his NASCAR Busch Series debut at the Milwaukee Mile in 2007, where he placed 20th. Mitchell competed in 19 NASCAR Truck Series races between 2007 and 2009, reaching the top-ten once.

== Motorsports career results ==
=== NASCAR ===
(key) (Bold – Pole position awarded by qualifying time. Italics – Pole position earned by points standings or practice time. * – Most laps led.)

==== Busch Series ====
NASCAR Busch Series results
Year	Team	No.	Make	1	2	3	4	5	6	7	8	9	10	11	12	13	14	15	16	17	18	19	20	21	22	23	24	25	26	27	28	29	30	31	32	33	34	35	NBSC	Pts	Ref
2005	Kenneth Appling Racing	86	Chevy	DAY	CAL	MXC	LVS	ATL	NSH	BRI	TEX	PHO	TAL	DAR	RCH	CLT	DOV	NSH; 42	KEN	MLW	DAY	CHI	NHA	PPR	GTY; 41	IRP	GLN	MCH	BRI	CAL	RCH	DOV	KAN	CLT	MEM; DNQ	TEX	PHO	HOM; DNQ	141st	37	
2006	Keith Coleman Racing	23	Chevy	DAY	CAL	MXC	LVS	ATL	BRI	TEX	NSH	PHO; DNQ	TAL	RCH	DAR	CLT	DOV	NSH	KEN	MLW	DAY	CHI	NHA	MAR	GTY	IRP	GLN	MCH	BRI	CAL	RCH	DOV	KAN	CLT	MEM	TEX	PHO	HOM	NA	-	
2007	CJM Racing	11	Chevy	DAY	CAL	MXC	LVS	ATL	BRI	NSH	TEX	PHO	TAL	RCH	DAR	CLT	DOV	NSH	KEN	MLW; 20	NHA	DAY	CHI	GTY	IRP	CGV	GLN	MCH	BRI	CAL	RCH								113th	155	
2007	MacDonald Motorsports	72	Dodge																													DOV; 37	KAN	CLT					113th	155	
2007	CJM Racing	12	Chevy																																MEM; DNQ	TEX	PHO	HOM	113th	155	

==== Camping World Truck Series ====
NASCAR Camping World Truck Series results
Year	Team	No.	Make	1	2	3	4	5	6	7	8	9	10	11	12	13	14	15	16	17	18	19	20	21	22	23	24	25	NCWTC	Pts	Ref
2007	Green Light Racing	08	Chevy	DAY	CAL	ATL	MAR	KAN	CLT	MFD	DOV	TEX	MCH	MLW	MEM	KEN	IRP	NSH	BRI	GTW	NHA	LVS	TAL; 33	MAR	ATL	TEX	PHO	HOM	106th	64	
2008	Billy Ballew Motorsports	15	Chevy	DAY; 13	CAL; 20	ATL; 23	MAR																						27th	1295	
2008	Billy Ballew Motorsports	15	Toyota					KAN; 31	CLT; 24	MFD; 26	DOV	TEX; 12	MCH; 22	MLW; 15	MEM; 31	KEN; 9	IRP; 25	NSH	BRI	GTW; 26	NHA	LVS	TAL	MAR	ATL	TEX	PHO	HOM	27th	1295	
2009	Lafferty Motorsports	89	Chevy	DAY; DNQ																									44th	367	
2009	GunBroker Racing	21	Dodge		CAL; 30	ATL	MAR				TEX; 31	MCH	MLW	MEM	KEN	IRP	NSH	BRI	CHI	IOW	GTW	NHA	LVS	MAR	TAL				44th	367	
2009	Fast Track Racing Enterprises	47	Chevy					KAN; 30	CLT; 32	DOV																			44th	367	
2009	Sharp Hartman Racing	41	Dodge																							TEX; 28	PHO	HOM	44th	367	

=== ARCA Re/Max Series ===
(key) (Bold – Pole position awarded by qualifying time. Italics – Pole position earned by points standings or practice time. * – Most laps led.)

ARCA Re/Max Series results
Year	Team	No.	Make	1	2	3	4	5	6	7	8	9	10	11	12	13	14	15	16	17	18	19	20	21	22	23	ARMC	Pts	Ref
2005	Kenneth Appling Racing	3	Pontiac	DAY; 27																							80th	360	
2005	Kenneth Appling Racing	3	Chevy		NSH; 32	SLM	KEN; 7	TOL	LAN	MIL	POC	MCH	KAN	KEN	BLN	POC	GTW	LER	NSH	MCH	ISF	TOL	DSF	CHI	SLM	TAL	80th	360	
2006	Norm Benning Racing	8	Pontiac	DAY	NSH	SLM	WIN	KEN	TOL	POC	MCH	KAN	KEN	BLN	POC	GTW	NSH	MCH	ISF	MIL	TOL	DSF	CHI	SLM	TAL; 34	IOW	165th	60	
2007	White Racing	93	Pontiac	DAY; 2	USA																						28th	1505	
2007	White Racing	93	Chevy			NSH; 8	SLM	KAN; 40	WIN	KEN	TOL	IOW; 15	POC; 40	MCH	BLN	KEN; 17	POC; 5										28th	1505	
2007	Cunningham Motorsports	4	Dodge															NSH; 39	ISF	MIL; 7	GTW; 30	DSF					28th	1505	
2007	Gibson Racing	56	Chevy																				CHI; 31	SLM			28th	1505	
2007	Norm Benning Racing	8	Pontiac																						TAL; 20	TOL	28th	1505	
