= Andy Ponstein =

American racing driver

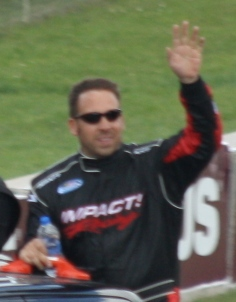
- Ponstein at Road America in 2010
- Born: Andrew William Ponstein; May 2, 1976 (age 50); Jenison, Michigan, U.S.
- Awards: 2002 CRA Sunoco Super Series Rookie of the Year

NASCAR O'Reilly Auto Parts Series career
- 26 races run over 5 years
- Best finish: 55th (2004)
- First race: 2004 Goody's Headache Powder 200 (Rockingham)
- Last race: 2011 Alliance Truck Parts 250 (Michigan)
Wins	Top tens	Poles
0	0	0

NASCAR FedEx Freight Truck Series career
- 7 races run over 2 years
- Best finish: 47th (2009)
- First race: 2003 Power Stroke Diesel 200 (IRP)
- Last race: 2009 Heluva Good! 200 (Loudon)
Wins	Top tens	Poles
0	0	0

Andrew William Ponstein (born May 2, 1976) is an American professional stock car racing driver. He is a former competitor in the NASCAR Nationwide Series, NASCAR Camping World Truck Series, and ARCA Re/Max Series.

== Racing career ==
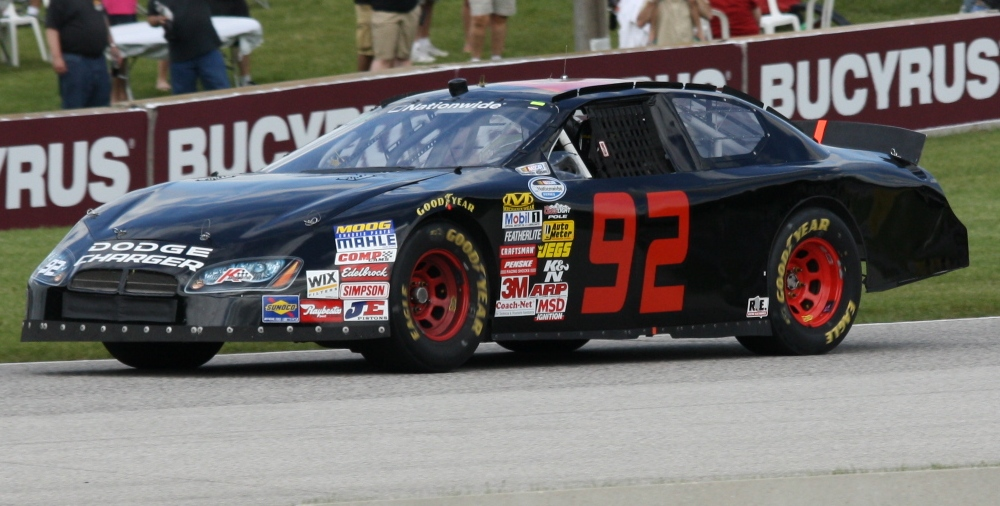
Ponstein's 2010 Nationwide Series car at Road America

A graduate of Hope College, Ponstein began his professional racing career in 1998, competing in the American Speed Association; moving to the CRA Super Series in 2001, he won his first race in the series in 2003.

Ponstein got his feet wet in NASCAR beginning in 2003, when he ran two races in the No. 70 Ford for the J&J Motorsports team, owned by John Bailey. He started in his first 15th at IRP and finished that race in 24th. His next race came at Richmond, where he finished 22nd despite a blown engine. He also competed in five ARCA Re/Max Series races that year.

Ponstein started 2004 off with a deal to drive the No. 39 Yahoo Ford for Jay Robinson Racing. After sitting out Daytona, Ponstein started 30th and would finish 25th in his debut at Rockingham. His debut would turn out to be his best run of the year, as he could only manage two other top-30s at Darlington (29th) and Nazareth (27th). Ponstein asked for his release from the team after nine races into 2004. He spent several years out of NASCAR, before returning in 2008 to drive for Corrie Stott Racing, competing for the next four years in selected Nationwide Series races, as well as five Camping World Truck Series races in 2009. In 2010, he raced in the first NASCAR Nationwide Series race at Road America.

In 2011, Ponstein returned to the CRA Super Series, as well as running Super Late Models at Berlin Raceway.

== Motorsports career results ==
=== NASCAR ===
(key) (Bold – Pole position awarded by qualifying time. Italics – Pole position earned by points standings or practice time. * – Most laps led.)

==== Nationwide Series ====
NASCAR Nationwide Series results
Year	Team	No.	Make	1	2	3	4	5	6	7	8	9	10	11	12	13	14	15	16	17	18	19	20	21	22	23	24	25	26	27	28	29	30	31	32	33	34	35	NNSC	Pts	Ref
2004	Jay Robinson Racing	39	Ford	DAY	CAR; 25	LVS; DNQ	DAR; 34	BRI; 29	TEX	NSH; 34	TAL	CAL	GTY; 34	RCH; 30	NZH; 27	CLT; 33	DOV; 37	NSH	KEN	MLW	DAY	CHI	NHA	PPR	IRP	MCH	BRI	CAL	RCH	DOV	KAN	CLT	MEM	ATL	PHO	DAR	HOM		55th	618	
2008	Corrie Stott Racing	02	Chevy	DAY	CAL	LVS	ATL	BRI	NSH	TEX	PHO	MXC	TAL	RCH; 40	DAR; 39	CLT; 40	DOV	NSH; 38	KEN; 33	MLW; DNQ	NHA; 37	DAY	CHI; 39	GTY; DNQ	IRP; DNQ	CGV	GLN	MCH	BRI	CAL	RCH	DOV	KAN	CLT; DNQ	MEM	TEX	PHO	HOM	75th	343	
2009	Corrie Stott Racing	02	Chevy	DAY	CAL; DNQ	LVS; 23	BRI; 39	TEX; 41	NSH; DNQ	PHO; DNQ	TAL	RCH	DAR	CLT	DOV	NSH	KEN	MLW	NHA	DAY	CHI	GTY	IRP								DOV; 37	KAN; DNQ	CAL; Wth	CLT; 39	MEM; 36	TEX; DNQ	PHO; Wth	HOM	86th	287	
2009	K-Automotive Motorsports	96	Dodge																					IOW; DNQ	GLN	MCH	BRI	CGV	ATL	RCH									86th	287	
2010	Corrie Stott Racing	02	Chevy	DAY	CAL; DNQ	LVS; DNQ	BRI; 21	NSH; DNQ	PHO; Wth	TEX	TAL	RCH	DAR	DOV	CLT	NSH	KEN																						97th	186	
2010	K-Automotive Motorsports	92	Dodge															ROA; 42	NHA	DAY	CHI	GTY	IRP	IOW	GLN	MCH	BRI	CGV	ATL	RCH	DOV	KAN; DNQ	CAL	CLT	GTY; 38	TEX	PHO	HOM	97th	186	
2011	Rick Ware Racing	75	Ford	DAY	PHO	LVS	BRI	CAL	TEX	TAL	NSH	RCH	DAR	DOV	IOW	CLT	CHI	MCH; 38	ROA	DAY	KEN	NHA	NSH	IRP	IOW	GLN	CGV	BRI	ATL	RCH	CHI	DOV	KAN	CLT	TEX	PHO	HOM		86th	6	

==== Camping World Truck Series ====
NASCAR Camping World Truck Series results
Year	Team	No.	Make	1	2	3	4	5	6	7	8	9	10	11	12	13	14	15	16	17	18	19	20	21	22	23	24	25	NCWTC	Pts	Ref
2003	J&J Motorsports	70	Ford	DAY	DAR	MMR	MAR	CLT	DOV	TEX	MEM	MLW	KAN	KEN	GTW	MCH	IRP; 24	NSH	BRI	RCH; 22	NHA	CAL	LVS	SBO	TEX	MAR	PHO	HOM	83rd	188	
2009	Corrie Stott Racing	02	Chevy	DAY	CAL	ATL	MAR	KAN	CLT; DNQ	DOV; 28	TEX	MCH; 28	MLW	MEM; DNQ	KEN	IRP	NSH	BRI	CHI; 36	IOW; 28	GTW	NHA; 35	LVS	MAR	TAL	TEX; DNQ	PHO	HOM	47th	350	

=== ARCA Re/Max Series ===
(key) (Bold – Pole position awarded by qualifying time. Italics – Pole position earned by points standings or practice time. * – Most laps led.)

ARCA Re/Max Series results
Year	Team	No.	Make	1	2	3	4	5	6	7	8	9	10	11	12	13	14	15	16	17	18	19	20	21	22	ARMC	Pts	Ref
2003	J&J Motorsports	70	Chevy	DAY	ATL	NSH	SLM	TOL; 12	KEN	CLT	BLN; 5	KAN							WIN; 8	DSF	CHI	SLM	TAL			31st	875	
2003	J&J Motorsports	70	Ford										MCH; 31	LER	POC	POC	NSH	ISF						CLT; 4	SBO	31st	875	
