= 2009 NASCAR Camping World Truck Series =

American motorsport season

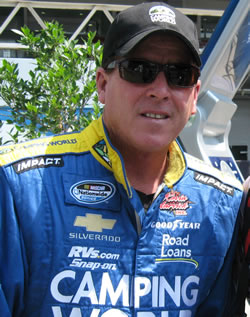
Ron Hornaday Jr., the 2009 Camping World Truck Series champion.

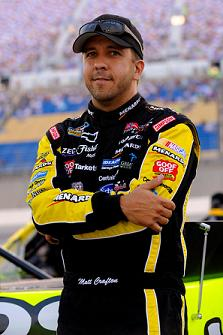
Matt Crafton came in second behind Hornaday despite not winning any races in 2009.

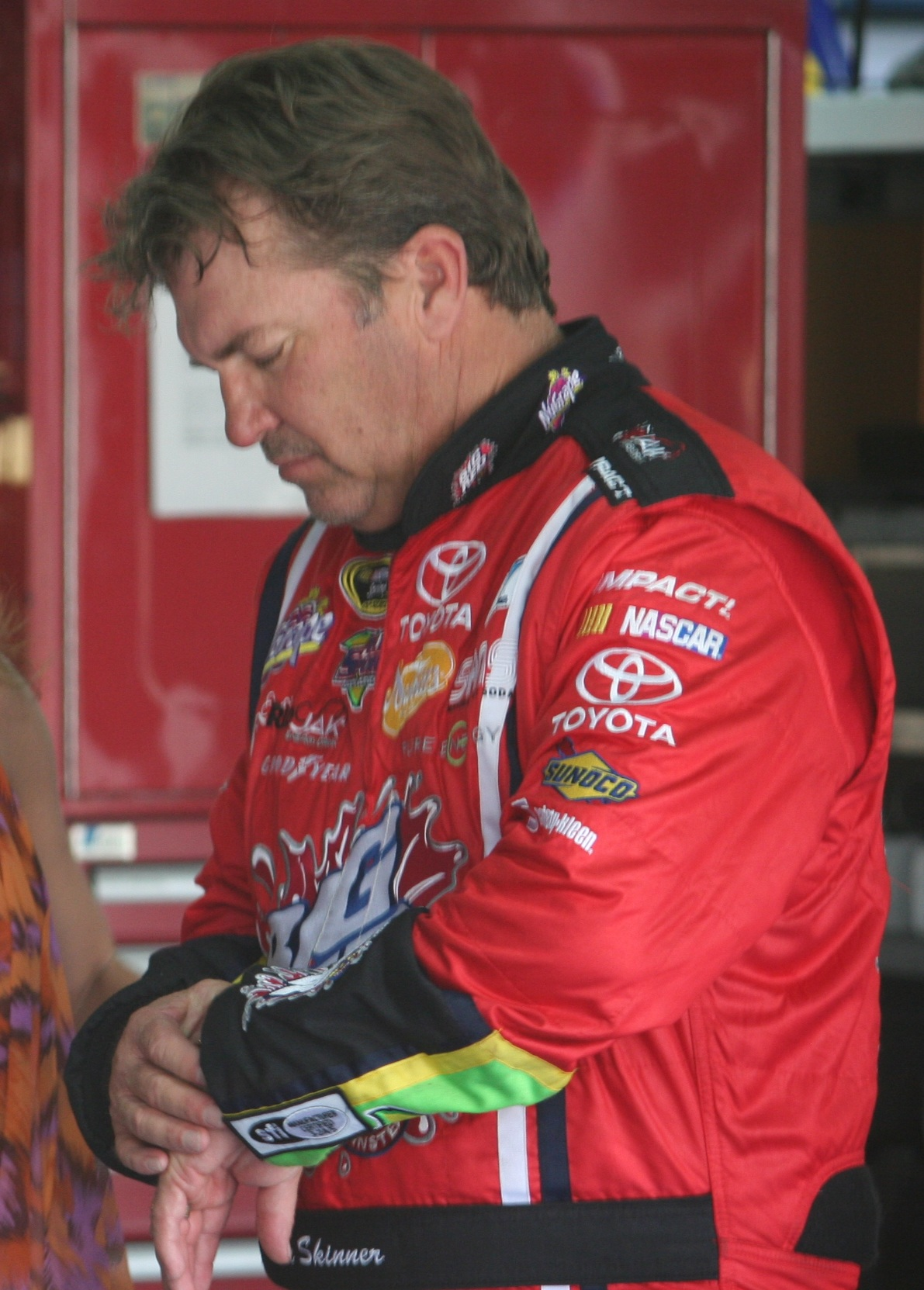
Mike Skinner finished third in the championship.

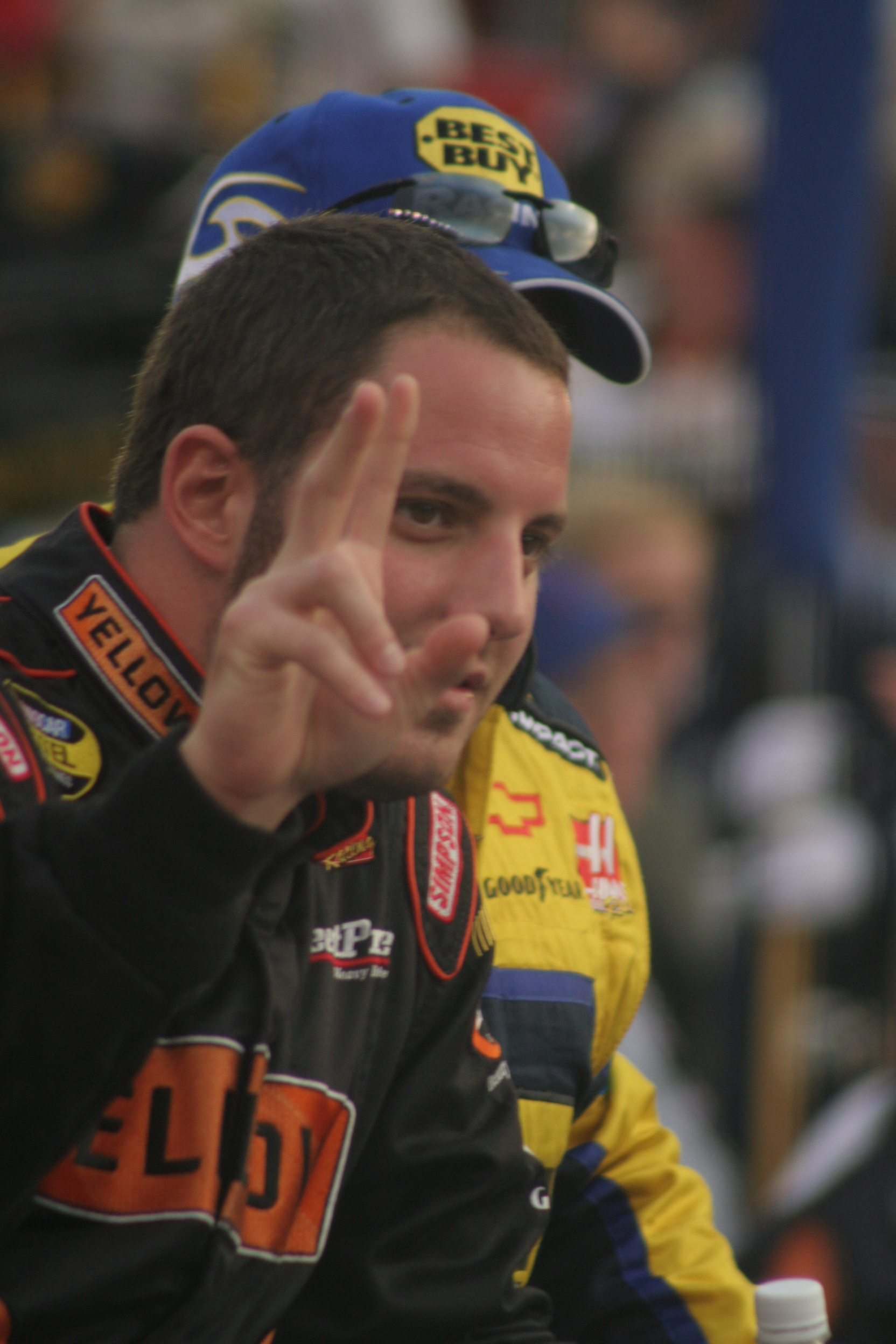
Johnny Sauter, the Camping World Truck Series Rookie of the Year.

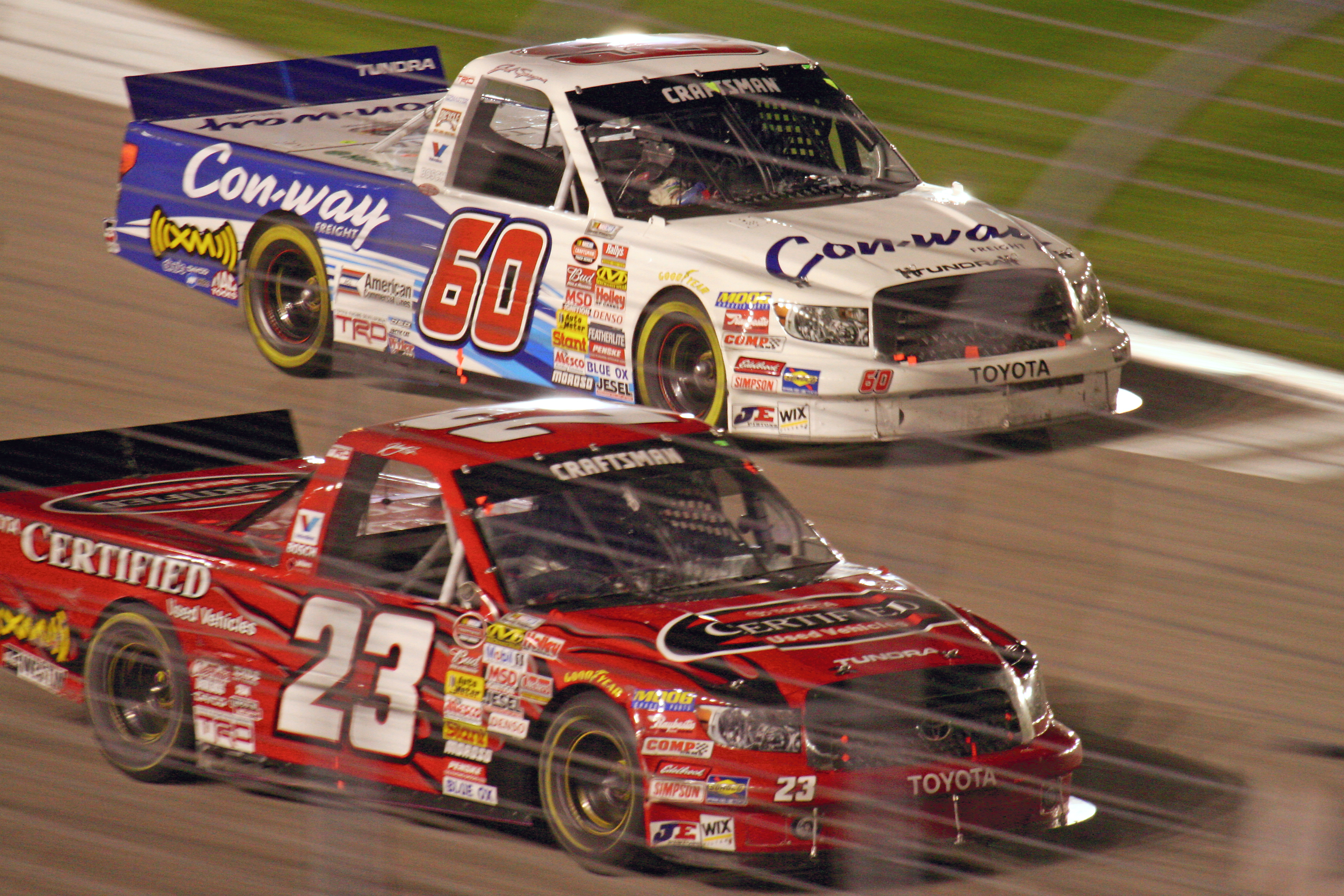
Toyota won their fourth consecutive manufacturers' championship with 14 wins.

The 2009 NASCAR Camping World Truck Series was the fifteenth season of the Camping World Truck Series, the pickup truck racing series sanctioned by NASCAR in the United States. It was contested over twenty-five races, beginning with the NextEra Energy Resources 250 at Daytona International Speedway and ending with the Ford 200 at Homestead-Miami Speedway. The season was the first under the Camping World sponsorship banner. Camping World, announced on October 23, 2008, that they would sponsor the series for the next seven seasons. Ron Hornaday Jr. won and clinched the championship for Kevin Harvick, Inc. at Phoenix, one race early. It was Hornaday's record-breaking fourth Truck Series championship.

== 2009 teams and drivers ==
=== Complete schedule ===
Manufacturer	Team	No.	Driver(s)	Crew chief
Chevrolet	Fast Track Racing Enterprises	47	Brandon Knupp (R) 16	David McClure
Chevrolet	Fast Track Racing Enterprises	47	Brett Butler 1	David McClure
Chevrolet	Fast Track Racing Enterprises	47	Marc Mitchell 2	David McClure
Chevrolet	Fast Track Racing Enterprises	47	Wayne Edwards 3	David McClure
Chevrolet	Fast Track Racing Enterprises	47	Chris Lawson 1	David McClure
Chevrolet	Fast Track Racing Enterprises	47	Richard Harriman 2	David McClure
Chevrolet	Fast Track Racing Enterprises	48	Bryan Silas 4	Cal Boprey 5 A. J. Genail 1 Jonathan Mostafa 10; Scott Alves 1 Jeremy Crandall 8
Chevrolet	Fast Track Racing Enterprises	48	Dennis Setzer 1	Cal Boprey 5 A. J. Genail 1 Jonathan Mostafa 10; Scott Alves 1 Jeremy Crandall 8
Chevrolet	Fast Track Racing Enterprises	48	Hermie Sadler 3	Cal Boprey 5 A. J. Genail 1 Jonathan Mostafa 10; Scott Alves 1 Jeremy Crandall 8
Chevrolet	Fast Track Racing Enterprises	48	Brandon Knupp (R) 2	Cal Boprey 5 A. J. Genail 1 Jonathan Mostafa 10; Scott Alves 1 Jeremy Crandall 8
Chevrolet	Fast Track Racing Enterprises	48	Wayne Edwards 9	Cal Boprey 5 A. J. Genail 1 Jonathan Mostafa 10; Scott Alves 1 Jeremy Crandall 8
Chevrolet	Fast Track Racing Enterprises	48	Hal Martin 1	Cal Boprey 5 A. J. Genail 1 Jonathan Mostafa 10; Scott Alves 1 Jeremy Crandall 8
Chevrolet	Fast Track Racing Enterprises	48	Richard Harriman 2	Cal Boprey 5 A. J. Genail 1 Jonathan Mostafa 10; Scott Alves 1 Jeremy Crandall 8
Chevrolet	Fast Track Racing Enterprises	48	Pierre Bourque 1	Cal Boprey 5 A. J. Genail 1 Jonathan Mostafa 10; Scott Alves 1 Jeremy Crandall 8
Chevrolet	Fast Track Racing Enterprises	48	Mike Wallace 1	Cal Boprey 5 A. J. Genail 1 Jonathan Mostafa 10; Scott Alves 1 Jeremy Crandall 8
Chevrolet	Fast Track Racing Enterprises	48	Dan Brode 1	Cal Boprey 5 A. J. Genail 1 Jonathan Mostafa 10; Scott Alves 1 Jeremy Crandall 8
Chevrolet	Kevin Harvick, Inc.	4	Ricky Carmichael (R) 16	Billy Wilburn 9 John Monsam 14; Ernie Cope 2
Chevrolet	Kevin Harvick, Inc.	4	Ryan Newman 1	Billy Wilburn 9 John Monsam 14; Ernie Cope 2
Chevrolet	Kevin Harvick, Inc.	4	J. R. Fitzpatrick (R) 5	Billy Wilburn 9 John Monsam 14; Ernie Cope 2
Chevrolet	Kevin Harvick, Inc.	4	Kevin Harvick 3	Billy Wilburn 9 John Monsam 14; Ernie Cope 2
Chevrolet	Kevin Harvick, Inc.	33	Ron Hornaday Jr.	Rick Ren
Chevrolet	Norm Benning Racing	57	Norm Benning (R)	Stan Hover 2 Ken Causey 23
Chevrolet	SS-Green Light Racing	07	Chad McCumbee 21	Bobby Dotter
Chevrolet	SS-Green Light Racing	07	Jason Young 3	Bobby Dotter
Chevrolet	SS-Green Light Racing	07	Burt Myers 1	Bobby Dotter
Chevrolet	SS-Green Light Racing	08	Butch Miller 12	Mike Davis
Chevrolet	SS-Green Light Racing	08	Sean Murphy 3	Mike Davis
Chevrolet	SS-Green Light Racing	08	Johnny Chapman 3	Mike Davis
Chevrolet	SS-Green Light Racing	08	Kevin Lepage 1	Mike Davis
Chevrolet	SS-Green Light Racing	08	Jamie Dick 2	Mike Davis
Chevrolet	SS-Green Light Racing	08	Brandon Knupp (R) 1	Mike Davis
Chevrolet	SS-Green Light Racing	08	Tim Brown 1	Mike Davis
Chevrolet	SS-Green Light Racing	08	Chrissy Wallace 1	Mike Davis
Chevrolet	SS-Green Light Racing	08	Brett Butler 1	Mike Davis
Chevrolet	ThorSport Racing	13	Johnny Sauter (R)	Ty Joiner 2 Jason Overstreet 12; Joe Shear Jr. 10
Chevrolet	ThorSport Racing	88	Matt Crafton	Bud Haefele
Dodge	GunBroker Racing	21	Dennis Setzer 1	Todd Coron 3 Harold Gaulding Jr. 4 Mike Dayton 10; Dewayne Gaulding 1 Paul Custer 1 Brandon Smith 7
Dodge	GunBroker Racing	21	Marc Mitchell 2	Todd Coron 3 Harold Gaulding Jr. 4 Mike Dayton 10; Dewayne Gaulding 1 Paul Custer 1 Brandon Smith 7
Dodge	GunBroker Racing	21	Johnny Chapman 2	Todd Coron 3 Harold Gaulding Jr. 4 Mike Dayton 10; Dewayne Gaulding 1 Paul Custer 1 Brandon Smith 7
Dodge	GunBroker Racing	21	Ryan Sieg 1	Todd Coron 3 Harold Gaulding Jr. 4 Mike Dayton 10; Dewayne Gaulding 1 Paul Custer 1 Brandon Smith 7
Dodge	GunBroker Racing	21	Chris Fontaine 1	Todd Coron 3 Harold Gaulding Jr. 4 Mike Dayton 10; Dewayne Gaulding 1 Paul Custer 1 Brandon Smith 7
Dodge	GunBroker Racing	21	Donnie Neuenberger 1	Todd Coron 3 Harold Gaulding Jr. 4 Mike Dayton 10; Dewayne Gaulding 1 Paul Custer 1 Brandon Smith 7
Dodge	GunBroker Racing	21	Nick Tucker (R) 16	Todd Coron 3 Harold Gaulding Jr. 4 Mike Dayton 10; Dewayne Gaulding 1 Paul Custer 1 Brandon Smith 7
Dodge	GunBroker Racing	21	Sean Murphy 1	Todd Coron 3 Harold Gaulding Jr. 4 Mike Dayton 10; Dewayne Gaulding 1 Paul Custer 1 Brandon Smith 7
Dodge	GunBroker Racing	23	Jason White	Doug Howe
Ford	Circle Bar Racing	10	James Buescher (R)	Jamie Jones
Ford	Circle Bar Racing	14	Rick Crawford	Kevin Starland
Ford	Roush Fenway Racing	6	Colin Braun	Mike Beam
Toyota	Billy Ballew Motorsports	15	Shane Sieg 5	Richie Wauters
Toyota	Billy Ballew Motorsports	15	Brian Ickler 5	Richie Wauters
Toyota	Billy Ballew Motorsports	15	Aric Almirola 14	Richie Wauters
Toyota	Billy Ballew Motorsports	15	Blake Feese 1	Richie Wauters
Toyota	Billy Ballew Motorsports	51	Kyle Busch 15	Doug George
Toyota	Billy Ballew Motorsports	51	Brian Ickler 6	Doug George
Toyota	Billy Ballew Motorsports	51	Travis Kvapil 1	Doug George
Toyota	Billy Ballew Motorsports	51	Aric Almirola 2	Doug George
Toyota	Billy Ballew Motorsports	51	Denny Hamlin 1	Doug George
Toyota	Germain Racing	30	Todd Bodine	Mike Hillman Jr.
Toyota	HT Motorsports	24	David Starr	Jason Miller
Toyota	HT Motorsports	25	Terry Cook 23	Danny Rollins
Toyota	HT Motorsports	25	Mike Bliss 2	Danny Rollins
Toyota	Premier Racing 8 Red Horse Racing 17	17	Timothy Peters	Chad Kendrick
Toyota	Randy Moss Motorsports	5	Mike Skinner	Eric Phillips
Toyota	Randy Moss Motorsports	81	Tayler Malsam (R)	Doug Wolcott
Toyota	Red Horse Racing	11	T. J. Bell	Rick Gay
Toyota	Wyler Racing	60	Stacy Compton	Marcus Richmond
Toyota	Xpress Motorsports	16	Brian Scott	Jeff Hensley

=== Part-time schedule ===
Manufacturer	Team	No.	Driver(s)	Crew chief	Rounds
Chevrolet	Aaron's Dream Team	00	Tim Bainey Jr.	Daniel Bainey	6
Chevrolet	BnB Racing	34	Paul Bamburak	Lance Jarvis	1
Chevrolet	Brad Keselowski Racing	29	Mikey Kile	Wayne Setterington Jr.	6
Chevrolet	Brad Keselowski Racing	29	Brad Keselowski	Wayne Setterington Jr.	1
Chevrolet	Brad Keselowski Racing	29	J. R. Fitzpatrick (R)	Wayne Setterington Jr.	1
Chevrolet	DGM Racing	12	Dexter Bean	George Church	2
Chevrolet	DGM Racing	12	Derek White	George Church	2
Chevrolet	DGM Racing	12	Mario Gosselin	George Church	14
Chevrolet	DGM Racing	72	Mario Gosselin	William Davis	1
Chevrolet	DGM Racing	72	Clay Rogers	William Davis	1
Chevrolet	DGM Racing	72	Peyton Sellers	William Davis	1
Chevrolet	DGM Racing	72	Michelle Theriault	William Davis	4
Chevrolet	DGM Racing	72	John Jackson	William Davis	5
Chevrolet	DGM Racing	92	John Jackson	John Sarppraicone	3
Chevrolet	DGM Racing	92	Derek White	John Sarppraicone	1
Chevrolet	Duane Bischoff Racing	27	Duane Bischoff	Justin Bischoff	2
Chevrolet	FDNY Racing	28	Andy Lally	Dick Rahilly	2
Chevrolet	FDNY Racing	28	Wayne Edwards	Dick Rahilly	1
Chevrolet	Glenden Enterprises	83	Brandon Duchscherer	Thomas Rule	2
Chevrolet	Glenden Enterprises	84	Chris Fontaine	Kevin Ingram	8
Chevrolet	Justin Hobgood Racing	53	Justin Hobgood	Robert Bentley	2
Chevrolet	Ken Schrader Racing	52	Ken Schrader	Donnie Richeson 1 Michael Fritts 1	2
Chevrolet	Kevin Harvick, Inc.	2	Kevin Harvick	Ernie Cope	3
Chevrolet	Kevin Harvick, Inc.	2	Ryan Newman	Ernie Cope	1
Chevrolet	Key Motorsports	40	Mike Bliss	Gary Showalter	5
Chevrolet	Key Motorsports	44	Lance Hooper	Unknown	2
Chevrolet	Lafferty Motorsports	89	Marc Mitchell	Chris Lafferty 7 Brian Sliney 3	1
Chevrolet	Lafferty Motorsports	89	Mike Harmon	Chris Lafferty 7 Brian Sliney 3	2
Chevrolet	Lafferty Motorsports	89	Dillon Oliver	Chris Lafferty 7 Brian Sliney 3	1
Chevrolet	Lafferty Motorsports	89	Nick Tucker (R)	Chris Lafferty 7 Brian Sliney 3	1
Chevrolet	Lafferty Motorsports	89	Wes Burton	Chris Lafferty 7 Brian Sliney 3	2
Chevrolet	Lafferty Motorsports	89	Jason Cochran	Chris Lafferty 7 Brian Sliney 3	1
Chevrolet	Lafferty Motorsports	89	Trevor Boys	Chris Lafferty 7 Brian Sliney 3	1
Chevrolet	Lafferty Motorsports	89	Chris Lafferty	Chris Lafferty 7 Brian Sliney 3	2
Chevrolet	LCS Motorsports	87	Chris Jones	Mark Parks	10
Chevrolet	Marc Davis Motorsports	19	Marc Davis	Tommy Morgan	2
Chevrolet	MRD Motorsports	8	Dennis Setzer	Randy Dean	16
Chevrolet	MRD Motorsports	8	Todd Kluever	Randy Dean	1
Chevrolet	Richard Childress Racing	3	Austin Dillon	Dan Deeringhoff	3
Chevrolet	Richard Childress Racing	22	Tim George Jr.	Billy Wilburn	1
Chevrolet	Rob Fuller Motorsports	71	Rob Fuller	Steve Plattenberger	4
Chevrolet	Rob Fuller Motorsports	71	Robert Richardson Jr.	Steve Plattenberger	1
Chevrolet	Rob Fuller Motorsports	71	Kevin Conway	Steve Plattenberger	1
Chevrolet	RSS Racing	38	Mike Garvey	Rod Sieg	1
Chevrolet	RSS Racing	39	Ryan Sieg	Mike Garvey	9
Chevrolet	RSS Racing	93	Shane Sieg	Tony Wilson 7 Kris Nicholson 1	7
Chevrolet	RSS Racing	93	Mike Garvey	Tony Wilson 7 Kris Nicholson 1	1
Chevrolet	Tagsby Racing	65	J. J. Yeley	Kelly Frankum	1
Chevrolet	Tagsby Racing	65	Trevor Boys	Kelly Frankum	2
Chevrolet	Tagsby Racing	65	Jamie Mosley	Kelly Frankum	1
Chevrolet	Tagsby Racing	65	Lance Hooper	Kelly Frankum	2
Chevrolet	Tagsby Racing	65	Chris Fontaine	Kelly Frankum	1
Chevrolet	Tagsby Racing	73	J. J. Yeley	Joey Sonntag	4
Chevrolet	Tagsby Racing	73	Dexter Bean	Joey Sonntag	1
Chevrolet	Tagsby Racing	73	Lance Hooper	Joey Sonntag	2
Chevrolet	Tagsby Racing	73	Ben Stancill	Jon Wolfe	1
Chevrolet	Tatman Motorsports	99	Brett Butler	Gary St. Amant	2
Chevrolet	ThorSport Racing	98	Michael McDowell	Jeriod Prince	1
Chevrolet	ThorSport Racing	98	David Gilliland	Jeriod Prince	1
Chevrolet	Trail Motorsports	32	Chase Austin	Dennis Conner	2
Chevrolet	TRG Motorsports	7	J. R. Fitzpatrick (R)	Butch Hylton	4
Chevrolet	TRG Motorsports	7	Frank Deiny Jr.	Butch Hylton	1
Chevrolet	TRG Motorsports	7	David Gilliland	Butch Hylton	1
Chevrolet	Win-Tron Racing 1 Turner Motorsports 3	31	Scott Wimmer	Michael Chaffee 1 Michael Shelton 1	2
Chevrolet	Win-Tron Racing 1 Turner Motorsports 3	31	Ricky Carmichael (R)	John Monsam	2
Chevrolet	Corrie Stott Racing	02	Andy Ponstein	Corrie Stott 13; Micah Horton 2	8
Chevrolet	Corrie Stott Racing	02	Danny Efland	Corrie Stott 13; Micah Horton 2	2
Chevrolet	Corrie Stott Racing	02	Steve Park	Corrie Stott 13; Micah Horton 2	1
Chevrolet	Corrie Stott Racing	02	Terry Cook	Corrie Stott 13; Micah Horton 2	1
Chevrolet	Corrie Stott Racing	02	Dillon Oliver	Corrie Stott 13; Micah Horton 2	3
Dodge	Corrie Stott Racing	01	Dillon Oliver	Micah Horton	2
Dodge	Corrie Stott Racing	01	Charles Lewandoski	Micah Horton	1
Dodge	Corrie Stott Racing	01	Dan Brode	Mark Randall	1
Dodge	Boys will be Boys Racing Co.	05	Wayne Edwards	Jerome Edge	1
Dodge	Boys will be Boys Racing Co.	05	Mike Harmon	Jerome Edge	1
Dodge	Boys will be Boys Racing Co.	50	Wheeler Boys	Trevor Boys	3
Dodge	Boys will be Boys Racing Co.	50	Jennifer Jo Cobb	Trevor Boys	1
Dodge	CHS Motorsports	41	Ryan Matthews	Todd Coron	4
Dodge	CHS Motorsports	41	Chris Jones	Todd Coron	2
Dodge	CHS Motorsports	41	Marc Mitchell	Todd Coron	1
Dodge	CHS Motorsports	41	Dan Brode	Todd Coron	1
Dodge	Derrike Cope, Inc.	73	Jennifer Jo Cobb	Dom Turse	1
Dodge	Derrike Cope, Inc.	74	Larry Foyt	Dom Turse	1
Dodge	GunBroker Racing	22	Wayne Edwards	Harold Gaulding Jr.	2
Dodge	GunBroker Racing	22	Chris Jones	Harold Gaulding Jr.	1
Dodge	GunBroker Racing	22	Chris Fontaine	Harold Gaulding Jr.	1
Dodge	Thompson Motorsports	61	Brett Thompson	Lonnie Rush 2 Charlie Wilson 1	3
Ford	Brent Raymer Racing	85	Brent Raymer (R)	Josh Raymer	15
Ford	Martins Motorsports	44	Tommy Joe Martins	Joey Jones	4
Ford	MB Motorsports	36	Jack Smith	Kendall Downs	2
Ford	MB Motorsports	36	Tim Andrews	Mike Mittler	1
Ford	MB Motorsports	63	Tim Andrews	Mike Mittler	1
Ford	MB Motorsports	63	Ben Stancill	Mike Mittler	4
Ford	Ray Hackett Racing	75	Ryan Mathews	Ray Hackett	2
Ford	Ray Hackett Racing	76	Ryan Hackett	Craig Nemes	8
Ford	Robbie Brand Racing	37	Robbie Brand	Roger Gordon	1
Toyota	Billy Ballew Motorsports	09	John Wes Townley	Brad Parrott	1
Toyota	Billy Ballew Motorsports	09	Nate Monteith	Brad Parrott	1
Toyota	Germain Racing	9	Max Papis	Mike Hillman, Sr. 6 Peter Sospenzo 1 Bruce Cook 2	9
Toyota	Premier Racing	17	Peyton Sellers	Jason Overstreet	1
Toyota	Premier Racing	77	J. C. Stout	Steve Stallings	2
Toyota	Red Horse Racing	1	Johnny Benson	Tripp Bruce	8
Toyota	Red Horse Racing	1	Caitlin Shaw	Billy Venturini	1
Toyota	Stringer Motorsports	90	Gabi DiCarlo	Randy Nelson	3
Toyota	Stringer Motorsports	90	Jason Leffler	Randy Nelson	1
Toyota	Stringer Motorsports	90	Brent Sherman	Randy Nelson	2
Toyota	Stringer Motorsports	90	Brad Sweet	Randy Nelson	2
Toyota	Wyler Racing	06	Johnny Chapman	Steve Hawkins	2
Chevrolet Dodge	Mike Harmon Racing	42	Mike Harmon	Jerome Edge	4

== Schedule ==
No.	Event	Venue	Distance	Winner	Date	Time
1	NextEra Energy Resources 250	Daytona International Speedway	100 laps / 250 miles	Todd Bodine	February 13	8 PM
2	San Bernardino County 200	Auto Club Speedway	100 laps / 200 miles	Kyle Busch	February 21	3 PM
3	American Commercial Lines 200	Atlanta Motor Speedway	130 laps / 200 miles	Kyle Busch	March 7	1 PM
4	Kroger 250	Martinsville Speedway	250 laps	Kevin Harvick	March 30	12 PM*
5	O'Reilly Auto Parts 250	Kansas Speedway	167 laps/ 250.5 miles	Mike Skinner	April 25	2 PM
6	North Carolina Education Lottery 200	Lowe's Motor Speedway	134 laps/ 201 miles	Ron Hornaday Jr.	May 15	8 PM
7	AAA Insurance 200	Dover International Speedway	200 laps/ 200 miles	Brian Scott	May 29	1 PM
8	Winstar World Casino 400K	Texas Motor Speedway	167 laps/ 400.8 kilometers	Todd Bodine	June 5	3:30 PM
9	Michigan 200	Michigan International Speedway	100 laps/ 200 miles	Colin Braun	June 13	2 PM
10	Copart 200	The Milwaukee Mile	200 laps/ 200 miles	Ron Hornaday Jr.	June 20	1:30 PM
11	MemphisTravel.com 200	Memphis Motorsports Park	200 laps	Ron Hornaday Jr.	June 27	5:30 PM
12	Built Ford Tough 225	Kentucky Speedway	150 laps/ 225 miles	Ron Hornaday Jr.	July 18	3 PM
13	AAA Insurance 200	O'Reilly Raceway Park	200 laps	Ron Hornaday Jr.	July 24	3 PM
14	Toyota Tundra 200	Nashville Superspeedway	150 laps/ 200 miles	Ron Hornaday Jr.	August 1	2 PM
15	O'Reilly 200	Bristol Motor Speedway	200 laps	Kyle Busch	August 19	2 PM
16	EnjoyIllinois.com 225	Chicagoland Speedway	150 laps/ 225 miles	Kyle Busch	August 28	3 PM
17	Lucas Oil 200	Iowa Speedway	200 laps	Mike Skinner	September 5	9:30 PM
18	Camping World 200	Gateway International Raceway	160 laps/ 200 miles	Mike Skinner	September 12	2 PM
19	Heluva Good! 200	New Hampshire Motor Speedway	200 laps	Kyle Busch	September 19	1 PM
20	Las Vegas 350	Las Vegas Motor Speedway	146 laps/ 350.4 kilometers	Johnny Sauter	September 26	3 PM
21	Kroger 200	Martinsville Speedway	200 laps	Timothy Peters	October 24	12 PM
22	Mountain Dew 250	Talladega Superspeedway	94 laps/ 250.04 miles	Kyle Busch	October 31	1 PM
23	WinStar World Casino 350K	Texas Motor Speedway	146 laps/ 350.4 kilometers	Kyle Busch	November 6	8 PM
24	Lucas Oil 150	Phoenix International Raceway	150 laps/ 150 miles	Kevin Harvick	November 13	2 PM
25	Ford 200	Homestead-Miami Speedway	134 laps/ 201 miles	Kevin Harvick	November 20	1 PM

- *This race was delayed from its scheduled start on Fox on Saturday due to heavy rain.

== Races ==
=== NextEra Energy Resources 250 ===
The NextEra Energy Resources 250 was held on February 13 at Daytona International Speedway. Colin Braun won the pole for the event but Todd Bodine won the race.

Top ten finishers
Pos.	Car #	Driver	Make	Team
1	30	Todd Bodine	Toyota	Germain Racing
2	51	Kyle Busch	Toyota	Billy Ballew Motorsports
3	25	Terry Cook	Toyota	HT Motorsports
4	7	J. R. Fitzpatrick (R)	Chevrolet	TRG Motorsports
5	33	Ron Hornaday Jr.	Chevrolet	Kevin Harvick, Inc.
6	17	Timothy Peters	Toyota	Premier Racing
7	5	Mike Skinner	Toyota	Randy Moss Motorsports
8	88	Matt Crafton	Chevrolet	ThorSport Racing
9	6	Colin Braun	Ford	Roush Fenway Racing
10	81	Tayler Malsam (R)	Toyota	Randy Moss Motorsports

Failed to qualify: Andy Lally (#28), Norm Benning (#57), Marc Mitchell (#89).

NOTE: Ron Hornaday Jr. suffered a 25-point penalty for rule infractions found in his truck during post-race inspection.

=== San Bernardino County 200 ===
The San Bernardino County 200 was held on February 21 at Auto Club Speedway. Kyle Busch won the pole.

Top ten finishers
Pos.	Car #	Driver	Make	Team
1	51	Kyle Busch	Toyota	Billy Ballew Motorsports
2	30	Todd Bodine	Toyota	Germain Racing
3	07	Chad McCumbee	Chevrolet	SS-Green Light Racing
4	24	David Starr	Toyota	HT Motorsports
5	11	T. J. Bell	Toyota	Red Horse Racing
6	33	Ron Hornaday Jr.	Chevrolet	Kevin Harvick, Inc.
7	88	Matt Crafton	Chevrolet	ThorSport Racing
8	4	Ricky Carmichael (R)	Chevrolet	Kevin Harvick, Inc.
9	17	Timothy Peters	Toyota	Premier Racing
10	9	Max Papis	Toyota	Germain Racing

Failed to qualify: Mike Harmon (#89).

=== American Commercial Lines 200 ===
The American Commercial Lines 200 was held on March 7 at Atlanta Motor Speedway. Kyle Busch won his second consecutive pole.

Top ten finishers
Pos.	Car #	Driver	Make	Team
1	51	Kyle Busch	Toyota	Billy Ballew Motorsports
2	2	Kevin Harvick	Chevrolet	Kevin Harvick, Inc.
3	30	Todd Bodine	Toyota	Germain Racing
4	5	Mike Skinner	Toyota	Randy Moss Motorsports
5	25	Terry Cook	Toyota	HT Motorsports
6	07	Chad McCumbee	Chevrolet	SS-Green Light Racing
7	33	Ron Hornaday Jr.	Chevrolet	Kevin Harvick, Inc.
8	40	Mike Bliss	Chevrolet	Key Motorsports
9	1	Johnny Benson	Toyota	Red Horse Racing
10	16	Brian Scott	Toyota	Xpress Motorsports

Failed to qualify: None, only 36 entries

=== Kroger 250 ===
The Kroger 250 was held on March 30 at Martinsville Speedway. Rick Crawford won the pole.

Top ten finishers
Pos.	Car #	Driver	Make	Team
1	2	Kevin Harvick	Chevrolet	Kevin Harvick, Inc.
2	33	Ron Hornaday Jr.	Chevrolet	Kevin Harvick, Inc.
3	5	Mike Skinner	Toyota	Randy Moss Motorsports
4	1	Johnny Benson	Toyota	Red Horse Racing
5	14	Rick Crawford	Ford	Circle Bar Racing
6	60	Stacy Compton	Toyota	Wyler Racing
7	8	Dennis Setzer	Chevrolet	MRD Motorsports
8	16	Brian Scott	Toyota	Xpress Motorsports
9	88	Matt Crafton	Chevrolet	ThorSport Racing
10	52	Ken Schrader	Chevrolet	Ken Schrader Racing

Failed to qualify: None, only 36 entries

=== O'Reilly Auto Parts 250 ===
The O'Reilly Auto Parts 250 was held on April 25 and 27 at Kansas Speedway. Ron Hornaday Jr. won the pole.

Top ten finishers
Pos.	Car #	Driver	Make	Team
1	5	Mike Skinner	Toyota	Randy Moss Motorsports
2	1	Johnny Benson	Toyota	Red Horse Racing
3	16	Brian Scott	Toyota	Xpress Motorsports
4	33	Ron Hornaday Jr.	Chevrolet	Kevin Harvick, Inc.
5	15	Brian Ickler (R)	Toyota	Billy Ballew Motorsports
6	6	Colin Braun	Ford	Roush Fenway Racing
7	88	Matt Crafton	Chevrolet	ThorSport Racing
8	07	Chad McCumbee	Chevrolet	SS-Green Light Racing
9	13	Johnny Sauter (R)	Chevrolet	ThorSport Racing
10	23	Jason White	Dodge	GunBroker Racing

Failed to qualify: None, only 35 entries

=== North Carolina Education Lottery 200 ===
The North Carolina Education Lottery 200 was held on May 15 at Lowe's Motor Speedway. Kyle Busch won the pole based on owners' points.

Top ten finishers
Pos.	Car #	Driver	Make	Team
1	33	Ron Hornaday Jr.	Chevrolet	Kevin Harvick, Inc.
2	51	Kyle Busch	Toyota	Billy Ballew Motorsports
3	88	Matt Crafton	Chevrolet	ThorSport Racing
4	4	Ryan Newman	Chevrolet	Kevin Harvick, Inc.
5	25	Terry Cook	Toyota	HT Motorsports
6	7	David Gilliland	Chevrolet	TRG Motorsports
7	24	David Starr	Toyota	Red Horse Racing
8	81	Tayler Malsam (R)	Toyota	Randy Moss Motorsports
9	60	Stacy Compton	Toyota	Wyler Racing
10	8	Dennis Setzer	Chevrolet	MRD Motorsports

Failed to qualify: Wayne Edwards (#28), John Wes Townley (#09), Andy Ponstein (#02)

=== AAA Insurance 200 ===
The AAA Insurance 200 was held May 29 at Dover International Speedway. Ron Hornaday Jr. won the pole.

Top ten finishers
Pos.	Car #	Driver	Make	Team
1	16	Brian Scott	Toyota	Xpress Motorsports
2	8	Dennis Setzer	Chevrolet	MRD Motorsports
3	24	David Starr	Toyota	HT Motorsports
4	23	Jason White	Dodge	GunBroker Racing
5	13	Johnny Sauter (R)	Chevrolet	ThorSport Racing
6	88	Matt Crafton	Chevrolet	ThorSport Racing
7	07	Chad McCumbee	Chevrolet	SS-Green Light Racing
8	5	Mike Skinner	Toyota	Randy Moss Motorsports
9	51	Kyle Busch	Toyota	Billy Ballew Motorsports
10	25	Terry Cook	Toyota	HT Motorsports

Failed to qualify: None, only 36 entries

=== WinStar World Casino 400 ===
The WinStar World Casino 400 was held on June 5 at Texas Motor Speedway. Johnny Sauter won his first career pole.

Top ten finishers
Pos.	Car #	Driver	Make	Team
1	30	Todd Bodine	Toyota	Germain Racing
2	88	Matt Crafton	Chevrolet	ThorSport Racing
3	6	Colin Braun	Ford	Roush Fenway Racing
4	1	Johnny Benson	Toyota	Red Horse Racing
5	14	Rick Crawford	Ford	Circle Bar Racing
6	13	Johnny Sauter (R)	Chevrolet	ThorSport Racing
7	24	David Starr	Toyota	HT Motorsports
8	23	Jason White	Dodge	GunBroker Racing
9	81	Tayler Malsam (R)	Toyota	Randy Moss Motorsports
10	5	Mike Skinner	Toyota	Randy Moss Motorsports

Failed to qualify: None, only 33 entries

=== Michigan 200 ===
The Michigan 200 was held on June 13 at Michigan International Speedway. Brian Ickler won his first career pole.

Top ten finishers
Pos.	Car #	Driver	Make	Team
1	6	Colin Braun	Ford	Roush Fenway Racing
2	51	Kyle Busch	Toyota	Billy Ballew Motorsports
3	15	Brian Ickler (R)	Toyota	Billy Ballew Motorsports
4	88	Matt Crafton	Chevrolet	ThorSport Racing
5	5	Mike Skinner	Toyota	Randy Moss Motorsports
6	81	Tayler Malsam (R)	Toyota	Randy Moss Motorsports
7	33	Ron Hornaday Jr.	Chevrolet	Kevin Harvick, Inc.
8	17	Timothy Peters	Toyota	Red Horse Racing
9	8	Dennis Setzer	Chevrolet	MRD Motorsports
10	25	Terry Cook	Toyota	HT Motorsports

Failed to qualify: None, only 36 entries

=== Copart 200 ===
The Copart 200 was held on June 20 at Milwaukee Mile. Brian Ickler won the pole.

Top ten finishers
Pos.	Car #	Driver	Make	Team
1	33	Ron Hornaday Jr.	Chevrolet	Kevin Harvick, Inc.
2	8	Dennis Setzer	Chevrolet	MRD Motorsports
3	16	Brian Scott	Toyota	Xpress Motorsports
4	30	Todd Bodine	Toyota	Germain Racing
5	10	James Buescher (R)	Ford	Circle Bar Racing
6	14	Stacy Compton	Toyota	Turn One Racing
7	81	Tayler Malsam (R)	Toyota	Randy Moss Motorsports
8	13	Colin Braun	Ford	Roush Fenway Racing
9	24	David Starr	Toyota	HT Motorsports
10	25	Terry Cook	Toyota	HT Motorsports

Failed to qualify: None, only 33 entries

=== MemphisTravel.com 200 ===
The MemphisTravel.com 200 was held on June 27 at Memphis Motorsports Park. Ron Hornaday Jr. won the Pole.

Top ten finishers
Pos.	Car #	Driver	Make	Team
1	33	Ron Hornaday Jr.	Chevrolet	Kevin Harvick, Inc.
2	16	Brian Scott	Toyota	Xpress Motorsports
3	24	David Starr	Toyota	HT Motorsports
4	15	Aric Almirola	Toyota	Billy Ballew Motorsports
5	88	Matt Crafton	Chevrolet	ThorSport Racing
6	5	Mike Skinner	Toyota	Randy Moss Motorsports
7	17	Timothy Peters	Toyota	Red Horse Racing
8	13	Johnny Sauter (R)	Chevrolet	ThorSport Racing
9	6	Colin Braun	Ford	Roush Fenway Racing
10	30	Todd Bodine	Toyota	Germain Racing

Failed to qualify: Andy Ponstein (#02), Paul Bamburak (#34)

=== Built Ford Tough 225 ===
The Built Ford Tough 225 was held on July 18 at Kentucky Speedway. Ron Hornaday Jr. won the Pole.

Top ten finishers
Pos.	Car #	Driver	Make	Team
1	33	Ron Hornaday Jr.	Chevrolet	Kevin Harvick, Inc.
2	5	Mike Skinner	Toyota	Randy Moss Motorsports
3	88	Matt Crafton	Chevrolet	ThorSport Racing
4	17	Timothy Peters	Toyota	Red Horse Racing
5	15	Aric Almirola	Toyota	Billy Ballew Motorsports
6	16	Brian Scott	Toyota	Xpress Motorsports
7	4	Ricky Carmichael (R)	Chevrolet	Kevin Harvick, Inc.
8	10	James Buescher (R)	Ford	Circle Bar Racing
9	24	David Starr	Toyota	HT Motorsports
10	8	Dennis Setzer	Chevrolet	MRD Motorsports

Failed to qualify: Ryan Mathews (#41), Jack Smith (#36), Dillon Oliver (#02)

=== AAA Insurance 200 ===
The AAA Insurance 200 was held on July 24 at O'Reilly Raceway Park. Colin Braun won the Pole.

Top ten finishers
Pos.	Car #	Driver	Make	Team
1	33	Ron Hornaday Jr.	Chevrolet	Kevin Harvick, Inc.
2	5	Mike Skinner	Toyota	Randy Moss Motorsports
3	15	Aric Almirola	Toyota	Billy Ballew Motorsports
4	8	Dennis Setzer	Chevrolet	MRD Motorsports
5	6	Colin Braun	Ford	Roush Fenway Racing
6	10	James Buescher (R)	Ford	Circle Bar Racing
7	81	Tayler Malsam (R)	Toyota	Randy Moss Motorsports
8	60	Stacy Compton	Toyota	Wyler Racing
9	24	David Starr	Toyota	HT Motorsports
10	51	Kyle Busch	Toyota	Billy Ballew Motorsports

Failed to qualify: None, only 35 entries

=== Toyota Tundra 200 ===
The Toyota Tundra 200 was held on August 1 at Nashville Superspeedway. Timothy Peters won the Pole.

Top ten finishers
Pos.	Car #	Driver	Make	Team
1	33	Ron Hornaday Jr.	Chevrolet	Kevin Harvick, Inc.
2	16	Brian Scott	Toyota	Xpress Motorsports
3	6	Colin Braun	Ford	Roush Fenway Racing
4	17	Timothy Peters	Toyota	Red Horse Racing
5	88	Matt Crafton	Chevrolet	ThorSport Racing
6	13	Johnny Sauter (R)	Chevrolet	ThorSport Racing
7	14	Rick Crawford	Ford	Circle Bar Racing
8	8	Dennis Setzer	Chevrolet	MRD Motorsports
9	81	Tayler Malsam (R)	Toyota	Randy Moss Motorsports
10	11	T. J. Bell	Toyota	Red Horse Racing

Failed to qualify: None, only 34 entries

=== O' Reilly 200 ===
The O'Reilly 200 was held on August 19 at Bristol Motor Speedway. Ryan Newman won the Pole.

Top ten finishers
Pos.	Car #	Driver	Make	Team
1	51	Kyle Busch	Toyota	Billy Ballew Motorsports
2	88	Matt Crafton	Chevrolet	ThorSport Racing
3	33	Ron Hornaday Jr.	Chevrolet	Kevin Harvick, Inc.
4	2	Ryan Newman	Chevrolet	Kevin Harvick, Inc.
5	16	Brian Scott	Toyota	Xpress Motorsports
6	15	Aric Almirola	Toyota	Billy Ballew Motorsports
7	24	David Starr	Toyota	HT Motorsports
8	11	T. J. Bell	Toyota	Red Horse Racing
9	60	Stacy Compton	Toyota	Wyler Racing
10	17	Timothy Peters	Toyota	Red Horse Racing

Failed to qualify: Tim Bainey Jr. (#00), Brandon Duchscherer (#83), Duane Bischoff (#27)

=== EnjoyIllinois.com 225 ===
The EnjoyIllinois.com 225 was held on August 28 at Chicagoland Speedway. Matt Crafton won the Pole.

Top ten finishers
Pos.	Car #	Driver	Make	Team
1	51	Kyle Busch	Toyota	Billy Ballew Motorsports
2	30	Todd Bodine	Toyota	Germain Racing
3	6	Colin Braun	Ford	Roush Fenway Racing
4	14	Rick Crawford	Ford	Circle Bar Racing
5	13	Johnny Sauter (R)	Chevrolet	ThorSport Racing
6	8	Dennis Setzer	Chevrolet	MRD Motorsports
7	07	Chad McCumbee	Chevrolet	SS-Green Light Racing
8	15	Aric Almirola	Toyota	Billy Ballew Motorsports
9	17	Timothy Peters	Toyota	Red Horse Racing
10	25	Terry Cook	Toyota	HT Motorsports

Failed to qualify: Michelle Theriault (#72), John Jackson (#92), Ryan Hackett (#76)

=== Lucas Oil 200 ===
The Lucas Oil 200 was held on September 5 at Iowa Speedway. Mike Skinner won the Pole.

Top ten finishers
Pos.	Car #	Driver	Make	Team
1	5	Mike Skinner	Toyota	Randy Moss Motorsports
2	15	Aric Almirola	Toyota	Billy Ballew Motorsports
3	6	Colin Braun	Ford	Roush Fenway Racing
4	33	Ron Hornaday Jr.	Chevrolet	Kevin Harvick, Inc.
5	13	Johnny Sauter (R)	Chevrolet	ThorSport Racing
6	88	Matt Crafton	Chevrolet	ThorSport Racing
7	11	T. J. Bell	Toyota	Red Horse Racing
8	17	Timothy Peters	Toyota	Red Horse Racing
9	16	Brian Scott	Toyota	Xpress Motorsports
10	81	Tayler Malsam (R)	Toyota	Randy Moss Motorsports

Failed to qualify: Dillon Oliver (#01)

=== Copart 200 ===
The Copart 200 was held on September 12 at Gateway International Raceway. Colin Braun won the Pole.

Top ten finishers
Pos.	Car #	Driver	Make	Team
1	5	Mike Skinner	Toyota	Randy Moss Motorsports
2	13	Johnny Sauter (R)	Chevrolet	ThorSport Racing
3	16	Brian Scott	Toyota	Xpress Motorsports
4	51	Aric Almirola	Toyota	Billy Ballew Motorsports
5	81	Tayler Malsam (R)	Toyota	Randy Moss Motorsports
6	88	Matt Crafton	Chevrolet	ThorSport Racing
7	17	Timothy Peters	Toyota	Red Horse Racing
8	60	Stacy Compton	Toyota	Wyler Racing
9	39	Ryan Sieg	Chevrolet	RSS Racing
10	14	Rick Crawford	Ford	Circle Bar Racing

Failed to qualify: Dillon Oliver (#02), Jack Smith (#36), Ben Stancill (#63)

- This would be the final career NASCAR victory for Mike Skinner.

=== Heluva Good! 200 ===
The Heluva Good! 200 was held on September 19 at New Hampshire Motor Speedway. Mike Skinner won the Pole.

Top ten finishers
Pos.	Car #	Driver	Make	Team
1	51	Kyle Busch	Toyota	Billy Ballew Motorsports
2	33	Ron Hornaday Jr.	Chevrolet	Kevin Harvick, Inc.
3	2	Kevin Harvick	Chevrolet	Kevin Harvick, Inc.
4	88	Matt Crafton	Chevrolet	ThorSport Racing
5	13	Johnny Sauter (R)	Chevrolet	ThorSport Racing
6	60	Stacy Compton	Toyota	Wyler Racing
7	16	Brian Scott	Toyota	Xpress Motorsports
8	5	Mike Skinner	Toyota	Randy Moss Motorsports
9	6	Colin Braun	Ford	Roush Fenway Racing
10	14	Rick Crawford	Ford	Circle Bar Racing

Failed to qualify: None, only 36 entries

=== Las Vegas 350 ===
The Las Vegas 350 was held on September 26 at Las Vegas Motor Speedway. Todd Bodine won the Pole.

Top ten finishers
Pos.	Car #	Driver	Make	Team
1	13	Johnny Sauter (R)	Chevrolet	ThorSport Racing
2	88	Matt Crafton	Chevrolet	ThorSport Racing
3	23	Jason White	Dodge	GunBroker Racing
4	30	Todd Bodine	Toyota	Germain Racing
5	17	Timothy Peters	Toyota	Red Horse Racing
6	33	Ron Hornaday Jr.	Chevrolet	Kevin Harvick, Inc.
7	5	Mike Skinner	Toyota	Randy Moss Motorsports
8	51	Aric Almirola	Toyota	Billy Ballew Motorsports
9	15	Brian Ickler (R)	Toyota	Billy Ballew Motorsports
10	81	Tayler Malsam (R)	Toyota	Randy Moss Motorsports

Failed to qualify: None, only 35 entries

=== Kroger 200 ===
The Kroger 200 was held on October 24 at Martinsville Speedway. Mike Skinner won the Pole.

Top ten finishers
Pos.	Car #	Driver	Make	Team
1	1	Timothy Peters	Toyota	Red Horse Racing
2	30	Todd Bodine	Toyota	Germain Racing
3	6	Colin Braun	Ford	Roush Fenway Racing
4	33	Ron Hornaday Jr.	Chevrolet	Kevin Harvick, Inc.
5	4	Kevin Harvick	Chevrolet	Kevin Harvick, Inc.
6	51	Denny Hamlin	Toyota	Billy Ballew Motorsports
7	8	Dennis Setzer	Chevrolet	MRD Motorsports
8	24	David Starr	Toyota	HT Motorsports
9	88	Matt Crafton	Chevrolet	ThorSport Racing
10	25	Terry Cook	Toyota	HT Motorsports

Failed to qualify: Tim Bainey Jr. (#00), Chris Lafferty (#89), Dan Brode (#01)

=== Mountain Dew 250 ===
The Mountain Dew 250 was held on October 31 at Talladega Superspeedway. Colin Braun won the Pole.

Top ten finishers
Pos.	Car #	Driver	Make	Team
1	51	Kyle Busch	Toyota	Billy Ballew Motorsports
2	15	Aric Almirola	Toyota	Billy Ballew Motorsports
3	30	Todd Bodine	Toyota	Germain Racing
4	25	Terry Cook	Toyota	HT Motorsports
5	24	David Starr	Toyota	HT Motorsports
6	12	Mario Gosselin	Chevrolet	DGM Racing
7	60	Stacy Compton	Toyota	Wyler Racing
8	8	Dennis Setzer	Chevrolet	MRD Motorsports
9	53	Justin Hobgood	Chevrolet	William Bishop Motorsports
10	88	Matt Crafton	Chevrolet	ThorSport Racing

Failed to qualify: Mike Harmon (#42), Austin Dillon (#3)

=== WinStar World Casino 350 ===
The WinStar World Casino 350K was held on November 6 at Texas Motor Speedway. Matt Crafton won the Pole.

Top ten finishers
Pos.	Car #	Driver	Make	Team
1	51	Kyle Busch	Toyota	Billy Ballew Motorsports
2	88	Matt Crafton	Chevrolet	ThorSport Racing
3	33	Ron Hornaday Jr.	Chevrolet	Kevin Harvick, Inc.
4	30	Todd Bodine	Toyota	Germain Racing
5	6	Colin Braun	Ford	Roush Fenway Racing
6	13	Johnny Sauter (R)	Chevrolet	ThorSport Racing
7	16	Brian Scott	Toyota	Xpress Motorsports
8	5	Mike Skinner	Toyota	Randy Moss Motorsports
9	24	David Starr	Toyota	HT Motorsports
10	14	Rick Crawford	Ford	Circle Bar Racing

Failed to qualify: Lance Hooper (#65), Andy Ponstein (#02), John Jackson (#92)

=== Lucas Oil 150 ===
The Lucas Oil 150 was held on November 13 at Phoenix International Raceway. Johnny Sauter won the Pole.

Top ten finishers
Pos.	Car #	Driver	Make	Team
1	4	Kevin Harvick	Chevrolet	Kevin Harvick, Inc.
2	51	Kyle Busch	Toyota	Billy Ballew Motorsports
3	15	Aric Almirola	Toyota	Billy Ballew Motorsports
4	33	Ron Hornaday Jr.	Chevrolet	Kevin Harvick, Inc.
5	13	Johnny Sauter (R)	Chevrolet	ThorSport Racing
6	5	Mike Skinner	Toyota	Randy Moss Motorsports
7	25	Mike Bliss	Toyota	HT Motorsports
8	88	Matt Crafton	Chevrolet	ThorSport Racing
9	24	David Starr	Toyota	HT Motorsports
10	60	Stacy Compton	Toyota	Wyler Racing

Failed to qualify: None, only 36 entries

- Ron Hornaday Jr. would clinch the 2009 championship in this race.

=== Ford 200 ===
The Ford 200 was held on November 20 at Homestead-Miami Speedway. Colin Braun won the Pole.

Top ten finishers
Pos.	Car #	Driver	Make	Team
1	4	Kevin Harvick	Chevrolet	Kevin Harvick, Inc.
2	88	Matt Crafton	Chevrolet	ThorSport Racing
3	6	Colin Braun	Ford	Roush Fenway Racing
4	17	Timothy Peters	Toyota	Red Horse Racing
5	30	Todd Bodine	Toyota	Germain Racing
6	5	Mike Skinner	Toyota	Randy Moss Motorsports
7	24	David Starr	Toyota	HT Motorsports
8	33	Ron Hornaday Jr.	Chevrolet	Kevin Harvick, Inc.
9	13	Johnny Sauter (R)	Chevrolet	ThorSport Racing
10	11	T. J. Bell	Toyota	Red Horse Racing

Failed to qualify: Mike Harmon (#05), Derek White (#92)

== Full Drivers' Championship ==
(key) Bold – Pole position awarded by time. Italics – Pole position set by owner's points. * – Most laps led.

Pos	Driver	DAY	CAL	ATL	MAR	KAN	CLT	DOV	TEX	MCH	MIL	MEM	KEN	IRP	NSH	BRI	CHI	IOW	GTW	NHA	LVS	MAR	TAL	TEX	PHO	HOM	Points
1	Ron Hornaday Jr.	5	6	7	2	**4**	1	**26**	19*	7	1*	**1***	**1**	1*	1*	3	11	4	17*	2*	6	4	17	3	4	8	3959
2	Matt Crafton	8	7	11	9	7	3	6	2	4	16	5	3	16	5	2	**14**	6	6	4	2	9	10	**2**	8	2	3772
3	Mike Skinner	7	11	4	3	1*	29	8	10	5	19	6	2	2	14	20	13	**1***	1	**8**	7	**23**	19	8	6	6	3602
4	Todd Bodine	1	2	3	18	21	25	18	1*	13	4	10	16	18	13	32	2	19	18	24	**4**	2	3	4	12	5	3432
5	Colin Braun	**9**	20	26	35	6	26	22	3	1	8	9	20	**5**	3	12	3	3	**19**	9	17	3	**12**	5	28	**3**	3338
6	Johnny Sauter **(R)**	27	17	18	27	9	13	5	**6**	16	14	8	22	14	6	18	5	5	2	5	1*	16	14	6	**5**	9	3331
7	Brian Scott	12	29	10	8	3	21	1	15	34	3	2	6	12	2	5	28	9	3	7	19	24	23	7	11	12	3307
8	Timothy Peters	6	9	15	22	24	31	17	12	8	18	7	4	17	**4**	10	9	8	7	19	5	1*	11	19	16	4	3289
9	David Starr	17	4	17	24	17	7	3	7	11	9	3	9	9	18	7	22	26	16	13	15	8	5	9	9	17	3271
10	Rick Crawford	21	14	16	**5**	14	11	19	5	12	12	11	17	11	7	19	4	17	10	10	11	15	21	10	14	17	3161
11	Stacy Compton	14	15	19	6	13	9	13	21	19	6	17	12	8	15	9	12	16	8	6	20	14	7	22	10	21	3124
12	Tayler Malsam **(R)**	10	24	13	14	11	8	12	9	6	7	16	13	7	9	31	23	10	5	20	10	28	27	18	17	15	3026
13	Terry Cook	3	25	5	16	20	5	10	20	10	10	13	15	13	19	15	10	11	21	16	26	10	4	24	36		2890
14	James Buescher **(R)**	25	13	14	11	12	12	24	18	33	5	20	8	6	17	13	20	14	23	17	13	11	15	17	23	18	2884
15	T. J. Bell	11	5	12	31	22	30	23	14	18	28	18	23	15	10	8	15	7	24	12	12	30	29	23	13	10	2767
16	Jason White	22	27	27	23	10	14	4	8	14	23	23	14	26	16	14*	19	24	20	26	3	13	32	11	33	16	2733
17	Kyle Busch	2	**1***	**1**	17*		2	9*		2*				10		1	1*			1*			1	1*	2	13	2583
18	Dennis Setzer	18	26	28	7	15	10	2	17	9	2	15	10	4	8	21	6			11		7	8				2483
19	Chad McCumbee	19	3	6	28	8	15	7	13	24	25		11	32		27	7	15		29	16		24	20	15	11	2410
20	Aric Almirola								16		20	4	5	3		6	8	2	4	21	8	12	2	14	3	14	2301
21	Norm Benning	DNQ	28	30	25	31	24	30	33	17	24	21	18	23	22	29	24	27	26	23	24	25	18	29	25	29	2097
22	Ricky Carmichael **(R)**	24	8	21	29	23			11		21	14	7	19			18	13	22		22		20	12	18	19	1978
23	Brandon Knupp	31	32	31		27	28	34	32	29	30	30	28		28		30		29	36	28	36	34	31			1345
24	Brian Ickler **(R)**					5	16	25	22	**3**	15	12	21					18	15		9						1340
25	Mario Gosselin	29		32			17	36	29	31		19	27		26		32	20	32				6	21		20	1324
26	J. R. Fitzpatrick **(R)**	4	22	22	21			11		21					23	11				18			16				1137
27	Kevin Harvick			2*	1															3		5			1*	1*	1085
28	Wayne Edwards	36	34				DNQ	32	24	23	27		24	29	24	36	26	30	33		27				32		1067
29	Ryan Sieg				34						13		19		21		17	25	9		14			15		22	1065
30	Nick Tucker						Wth		30	32	33	32	30	35	31	34	34	32	30	31	29	34		36	34	26	1065
31	Brent Raymer **(R)**	23		29	33	35	22	35		30		36	36			25	29		28			29		26		25	1051
32	Johnny Benson	26	12	9	4	2	23	20	4																		1047
33	Chris Fontaine				20	32	36	14		15		27		21		23			13		33	17					1045
34	Max Papis		10	20	13			16								28				22	18	21	22				958
35	Shane Sieg	15	16	23	32	19							34		34		31	35			34			33		34	936
36	Chris Jones **(R)**			33		33	20			25		28	26	28		22		33		28		22	30	27			907
37	Butch Miller	30	31	34		29			26		31	35		33	32	35			31		32						819
38	Mike Bliss	33	18	8	15		27																		7	31	731
39	Mikey Kile				12						11						27		11		21			16			684
40	Johnny Chapman	32	33	35			33	31									33							34			448
41	Ryan Hackett **(R)**					28	18	29	27	22			33				DNQ						31				398
42	J. J. Yeley					16			23	20		25	25														385
43	Bryan Silas	16		25																				30		23	375
44	Marc Mitchell	DNQ	30			30	32		31															28			367
45	Tim Bainey Jr.							15						31		DNQ		21		30		DNQ					366
46	Tommy Joe Martins													22	27		21		27								361
47	Andy Ponstein						DNQ	28		28		DNQ					36	28		35				DNQ			350
48	Lance Hooper	35	36																35		23			DNQ		33	329
49	Ryan Newman						4									**4**											325
50	John Jackson						34		28	36					30		DNQ	31	36					DNQ			323
51	Rob Fuller													20		33				25		32					322
52	Ben Stancill					25	19						35						DNQ					32			319
53	Jason Young											24			20				14								315
54	Gabi DiCarlo		19	24		18					QL																306
55	Brett Thompson		21															23							20		297
56	Richard Harriman													27						27					31	35	292
57	Hermie Sadler				19											17						33					282
58	Dexter Bean							27			17								25								282
59	Brett Butler				26												24					20				24	279
60	Ken Schrader				10											16											249
61	Sean Murphy				36					35			31										33				247
62	Scott Wimmer							21																13			224
63	Chase Austin **(R)**	13	23			Wth																					218
64	Justin Hobgood	28																					9				217
65	David Gilliland						6																	35			208
66	Jamie Dick																	22							21		197
67	Ryan Mathews								25	26			DNQ		29		35	34									195
68	Michelle Theriault											34	32				DNQ	36									183
69	Brad Sweet																								22	27	179
70	Marc Davis																					18				32	176
71	Derek White																					26			24	DNQ	176
72	Tim Andrews																25							25			176
73	Dillon Oliver				30						22		DNQ					DNQ	DNQ		30						170
74	Denny Hamlin																					6					155
75	Dan Brode																					DNQ			30	30	146
76	Peyton Sellers										32											31					137
77	Travis Kvapil														11												130
78	Austin Dillon																	12		15			DNQ				127
79	Blake Feese														12												127
80	Todd Kluever																		12								127
81	Chrissy Wallace																						13				124
82	J. C. Stout	34	35																								119
83	Mike Garvey																		34							36	116
84	Brent Sherman											22					16										115
85	Burt Myers																					19					106
86	Kevin Conway																								19		106
87	Larry Foyt	20																									103
88	Caitlin Shaw													24													91
89	Duane Bischoff													25		DNQ											88
90	Steve Park																						25				88
91	Wheeler Boys																					35			26	28	85
92	Jennifer Jo Cobb					26																	36				85
93	Andy Lally	DNQ																					26				85
94	Hal Martin											26															85
95	Nate Monteith															26											85
96	Mike Wallace																						28				84
97	Tim Brown																					27					82
98	Robbie Brand																								27		82
99	Jason Leffler										29																76
100	Jamie Mosley												29														76
101	Pierre Bourque																	29									76
102	Tim George Jr.																								29		76
103	Brad Keselowski															30											73
104	Trevor Boys									27		31									35						70
105	Kevin Lepage							33																			64
106	Chris Lawson																			33							64
107	Frank Deiny Jr.					34																					61
108	Donnie Neuenberger						35																				58
109	Robert Richardson Jr.																						35				58
110	Clay Rogers			36																							55
111	Michael McDowell																			14							
112	Mike Harmon		DNQ			Wth					26	33								31	25		DNQ			DNQ	
113	Wes Burton											29			25												
114	Jason Cochran													30													
115	Danny Efland														33						31						
116	Charles Lewandoski																			32							
117	Brandon Duchscherer													34		DNQ											
118	Chris Lafferty																					DNQ			35		
119	John Wes Townley						DNQ																				
120	Paul Bamburak											DNQ															
121	Jack Smith												DNQ						DNQ								
Pos	Driver	DAY	CAL	ATL	MAR	KAN	CLT	DOV	TEX	MCH	MIL	MEM	KEN	IRP	NSH	BRI	CHI	IOW	GTW	NHA	LVS	MAR	TAL	TEX	PHO	HOM	Points

== See also ==
- 2009 NASCAR Sprint Cup Series
- 2009 NASCAR Nationwide Series
- 2009 NASCAR Camping World East Series
- 2009 NASCAR Camping World West Series
- 2009 ARCA Re/Max Series
- 2009 NASCAR Whelen Modified Tour
- 2009 NASCAR Whelen Southern Modified Tour
- 2009 NASCAR Canadian Tire Series
- 2009 NASCAR Corona Series
- 2009 NASCAR Mini Stock Series
- 2009 in sports
