= Dan Brode =

American racing driver

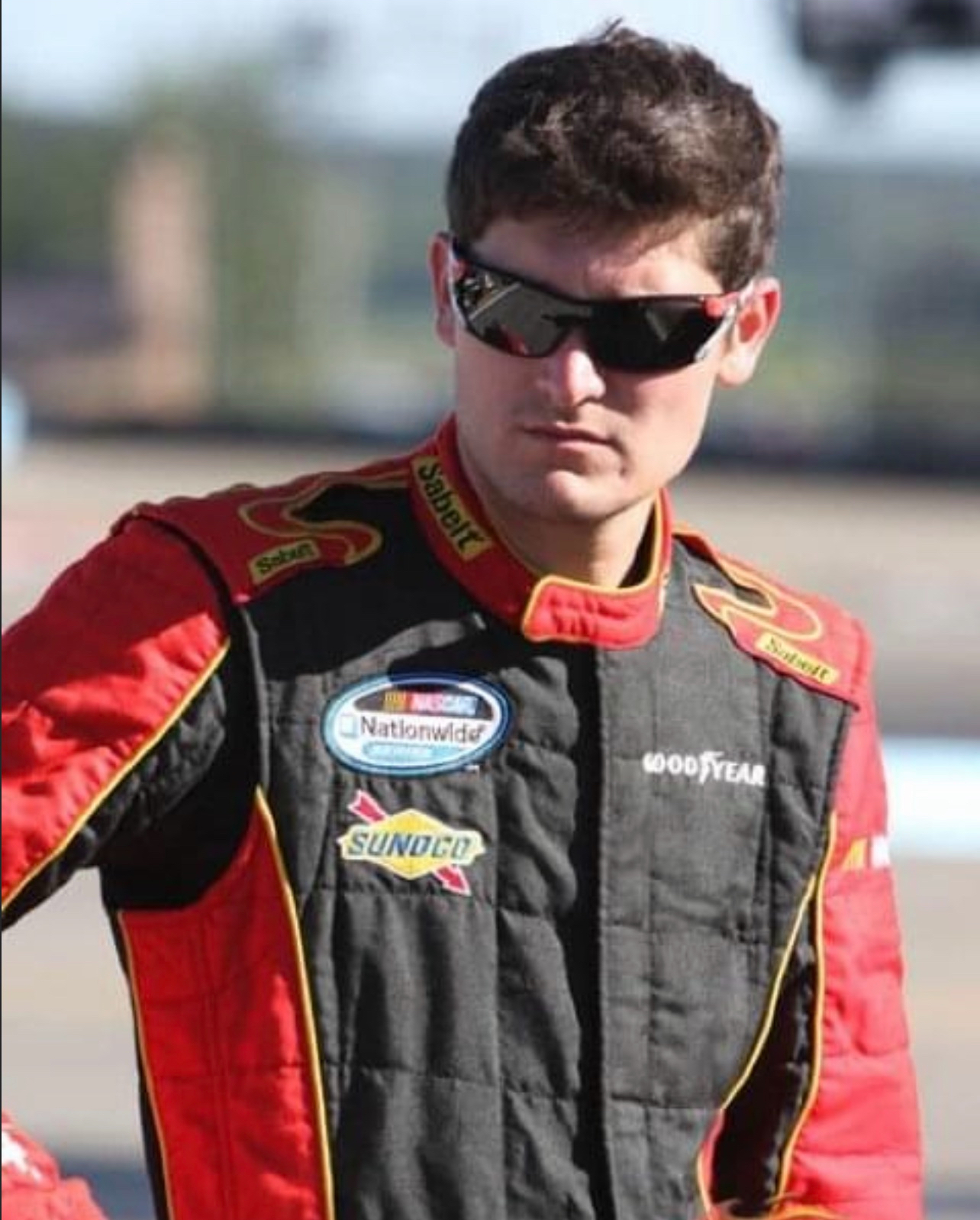
- Brode in 2010
- Born: March 15, 1985 (age 41); Columbia, South Carolina, U.S.

NASCAR O'Reilly Auto Parts Series career
- 1 race run over 1 year
- Best finish: 146th (2010)
- First race: 2010 Zippo 200 at the Glen (Watkins Glen)
Wins	Top tens	Poles
0	0	0

NASCAR FedEx Freight Truck Series career
- 2 races run over 1 year
- Best finish: 75th (2009)
- First race: 2009 Lucas Oil 150 (Phoenix)
- Last race: 2009 Ford 200 (Homestead)
Wins	Top tens	Poles
0	0	0

ARCA Menards Series career
- 3 races run over 1 year
- Best finish: 74th (2007)
- First race: 2007 Prairie Meadows 250 (Iowa)
- Last race: 2007 Hantz Group 200 by Belle Tire (Toledo)
Wins	Top tens	Poles
0	0	0
- Statistics up to date as of January 25, 2025.

Dan Brode (born March 15, 1985) is an American former professional stock car racing driver who has previously competed in the NASCAR Xfinity Series, the NASCAR Craftsman Truck Series, and the ARCA Racing Series.

== Motorsports results ==
=== NASCAR ===
(key) (Bold - Pole position awarded by qualifying time. Italics - Pole position earned by points standings or practice time. * – Most laps led.)

==== Nationwide Series ====
NASCAR Nationwide Series results
Year	Team	No.	Make	1	2	3	4	5	6	7	8	9	10	11	12	13	14	15	16	17	18	19	20	21	22	23	24	25	26	27	28	29	30	31	32	33	34	35	NNSC	Pts	Ref
2010	K-Automotive Motorsports	92	Dodge	DAY	CAL	LVS	BRI	NSH	PHO	TEX	TAL	RCH	DAR	DOV	CLT	NSH	KEN	ROA	NHA	DAY	CHI	GTY	IRP	IOW	GLN; 41	MCH	BRI	CGV	ATL	RCH	DOV	KAN	CAL	CLT	GTY	TEX	PHO	HOM	146th	40	

==== Camping World Truck Series ====
NASCAR Camping World Truck Series results
Year	Team	No.	Make	1	2	3	4	5	6	7	8	9	10	11	12	13	14	15	16	17	18	19	20	21	22	23	24	25	NCWTC	Pts	Ref
2009	Corrie Stott Racing	01	Dodge	DAY	CAL	ATL	MAR	KAN	CLT	DOV	TEX	MCH	MLW	MEM	KEN	IRP	NSH	BRI	CHI	IOW	GTW	NHA	LVS	MAR; DNQ	TAL	TEX			75th	146	
2009	Fast Track Racing Enterprises	48	Chevy																								PHO; 30		75th	146	
2009	CHS Motorsports	41	Dodge																									HOM; 30	75th	146	

=== ARCA Re/Max Series ===
(key) (Bold – Pole position awarded by qualifying time. Italics – Pole position earned by points standings or practice time. * – Most laps led.)

ARCA Re/Max Series results
Year	Team	No.	Make	1	2	3	4	5	6	7	8	9	10	11	12	13	14	15	16	17	18	19	20	21	22	23	ARSC	Pts	Ref
2007	Carter 2 Motorsports	67	Dodge	DAY	USA	NSH	SLM	KAN	WIN	KEN; DNQ																	74th	360	
2007	James Hylton Motorsports	48	Dodge								TOL; DNQ					KEN; DNQ	POC										74th	360	
2007	Carter 2 Motorsports	48	Dodge									IOW; 21	POC	MCH	BLN												74th	360	
2007	Andy Belmont Racing	62	Ford															NSH; 36	ISF	MIL	GTW	DSF	CHI	SLM	TAL		74th	360	
2007	Darrell Basham Racing	94	Chevy																							TOL; 24	74th	360	
