= Tayler Malsam =

American stock car racing driver

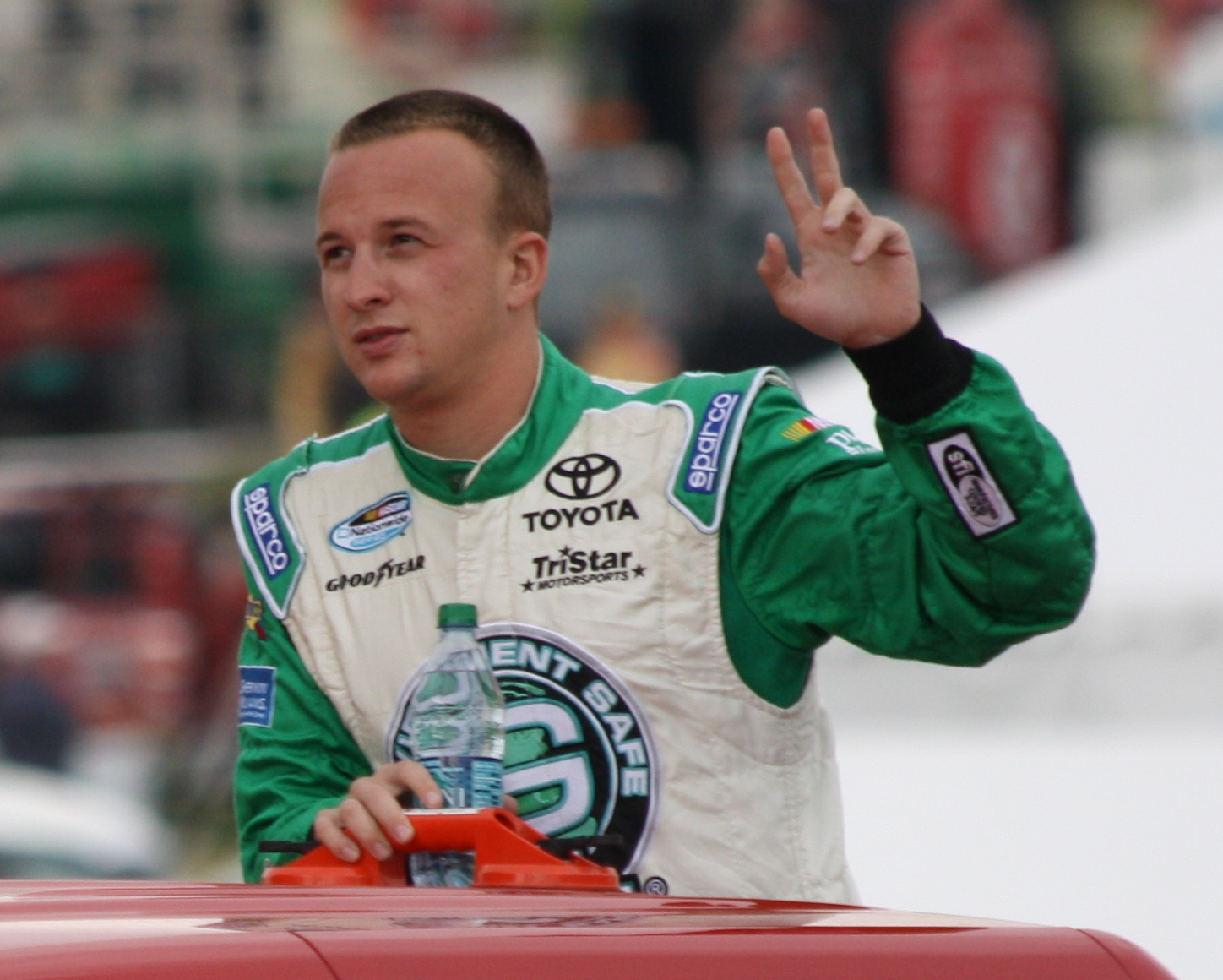
- Malsam at Road America in 2012
- Born: February 15, 1989 (age 37); Seattle, Washington, U.S.

NASCAR O'Reilly Auto Parts Series career
- 37 races run over 2 years
- 2012 position: 15th
- Best finish: 15th (2012)
- First race: 2010 Federated Auto Parts 300 (Nashville)
- Last race: 2012 Kentucky 300 (Kentucky)
Wins	Top tens	Poles
0	1	0

NASCAR FedEx Freight Truck Series career
- 51 races run over 5 years
- 2014 position: 21st
- Best finish: 12th (2009)
- First race: 2008 O'Reilly 200 (Bristol)
- Last race: 2014 Ford EcoBoost 200 (Homestead)
Wins	Top tens	Poles
0	16	0
- Statistics up to date as of November 14, 2014.

Tayler Malsam (born February 15, 1989) is an American former professional stock car racing driver.

== Early career ==
After spending time in USAC sprint cars, Malsam made his debut in the ARCA Remax Series in 2007 at Toledo Speedway. Driving for Mark Gibson, he started 8th and finished 33rd after a crash. In 2008, Malsam ran the full ARCA season in the #4 Dodge for Cunningham Motorsports, earning three top 5s and five top 10s.

== NASCAR career ==
In 2008, Malsam made his NASCAR debut in the Camping World Truck Series race at Bristol Motor Speedway. In the No. 41 ThunderBoats.org Dodge owned by Carl Hartman, he would start 33rd and finished 36th. Later that year, it was announced that Malsam would run full-time in the Truck Series in 2009 for Bill Davis Racing. In preparation for 2009, Malsam ran the season finale at Homestead-Miami Speedway in the No. 24 Toyota and finished 21st. Prior to the start of the 2009 season, Bill Davis Racing closed its doors and Malsam was signed by Randy Moss Motorsports to run the No. 81 Toyota. Over the course of the season, he earned ten top-tens, including a career best finish of fifth at Gateway International Raceway and finished 12th in the final points standings.

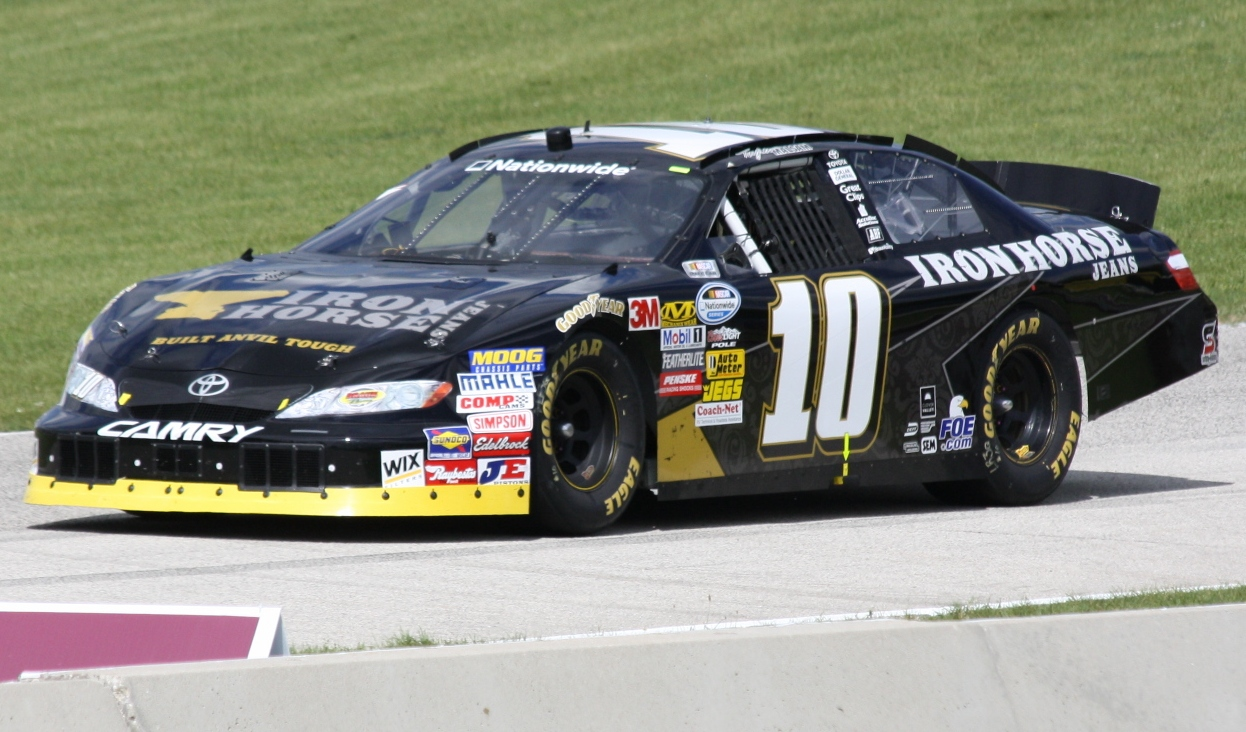
2010 #10 car for Braun Racing

For the 2010 season, it was announced that Malsam would run the No. 56 Toyota for the newly formed Kyle Busch Motorsports. After early sponsor Talking Rain was dismissed, Toyota sponsored their 2010 Truck effort. After Malsam accepted a ride in the Nationwide Series, KBM shut down the 56 team due to a lack of sponsorship. Malsam then made his Nationwide Series debut at Nashville Superspeedway, driving the Braun Racing No. 10 car. He would finish his Nationwide debut in 11th, although his debut would be overshadowed after a 25-point penalty was given to the team by NASCAR.

Malsam returned to the Truck Series in late 2010, driving the No. 25 for Randy Moss Motorsports with Exide on board. Malsam returned at Las Vegas and subsequently ran the last three races of the season, with a best finish of tenth at the Ford 200. It was also announced that Malsam would drive the 25 full-time in 2011. Malsam gained sponsorship from local Seattle business One Eighty, but failed to qualify at both Daytona and Phoenix. Malsam managed to finish 29th at Darlington, but RMM withdrew the No. 25 entry at Martinsville, later shutting down the team altogether.

For 2012, Malsam was tapped to drive the No. 19 Toyota full-time for TriStar Motorsports, securing a full season sponsorship from G-Oil. He posted a best finish of sixth in the season-opening DRIVE4COPD 300 at Daytona International Speedway, but was released from the team in late September.

In 2014, Malsam returned to NASCAR, joining Turner Scott Motorsports to drive the No. 32 Chevrolet on a limited basis in the Camping World Truck Series. He had two top-tens and three top-fives with a best finish of second at Talladega.

== Images ==
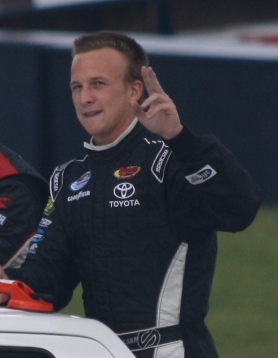
Malsam in 2010

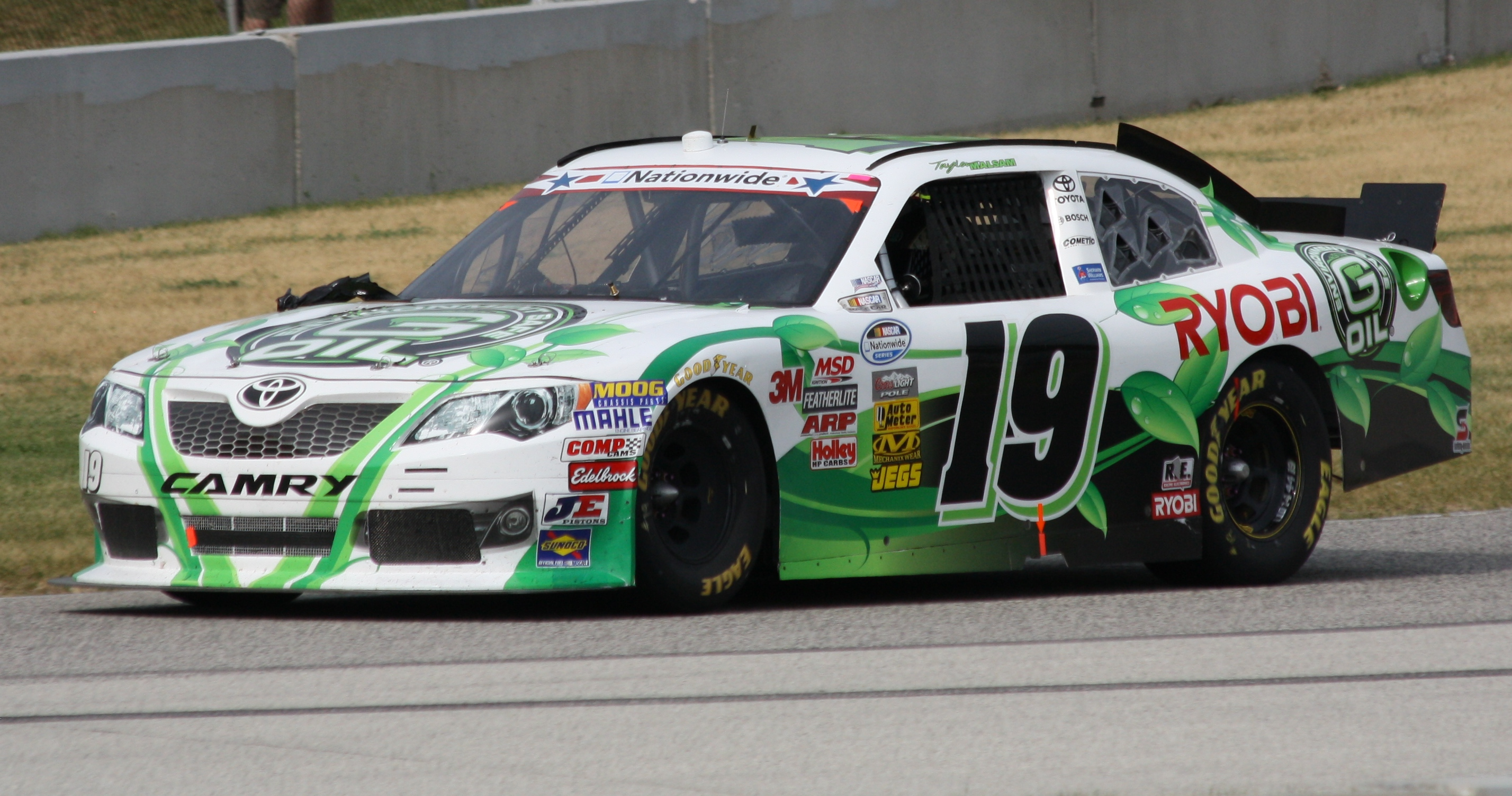
2012 Nationwide car

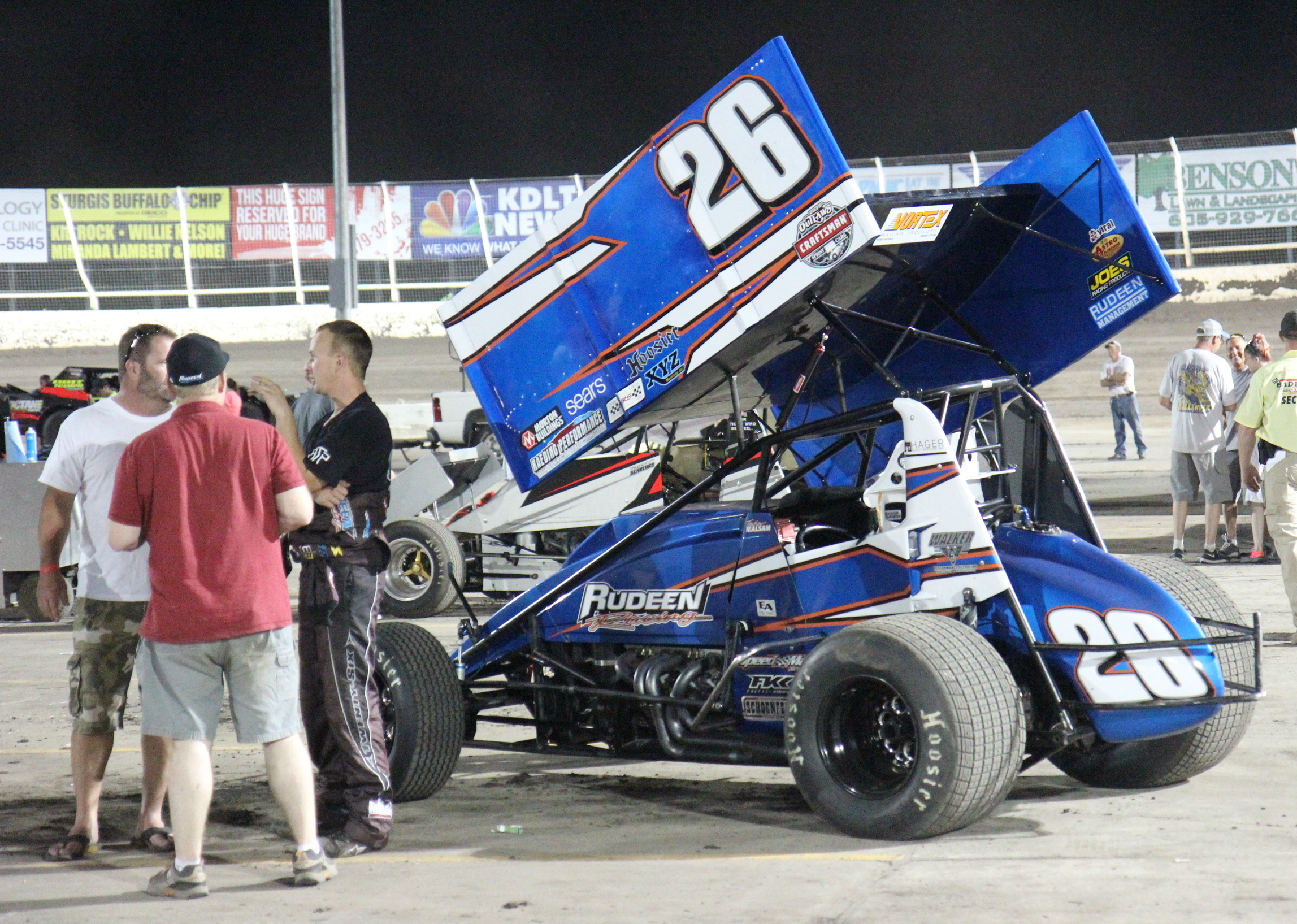
Malsam (right) beside his 2016 Sprint Car at Badlands Motor Speedway

== Motorsports career results ==
=== NASCAR ===
(key) (Bold – Pole position awarded by qualifying time. Italics – Pole position earned by points standings or practice time. * – Most laps led.)

==== Nationwide Series ====
NASCAR Nationwide Series results
Year	Team	No.	Make	1	2	3	4	5	6	7	8	9	10	11	12	13	14	15	16	17	18	19	20	21	22	23	24	25	26	27	28	29	30	31	32	33	34	35	NNSC	Pts	Ref
2010	Braun Racing	10	Toyota	DAY	CAL	LVS	BRI	NSH	PHO	TEX	TAL	RCH	DAR	DOV	CLT	NSH; 11	KEN; 35	ROA; 15	NHA; 35	DAY; 18	CHI	GTY; 18	IRP	IOW; 27	GLN; 12	MCH; 14	BRI	CGV; 23	ATL	RCH; 33	DOV	KAN	CAL	CLT	GTY	TEX	PHO	HOM	41st	1045	
2012	TriStar Motorsports	19	Toyota	DAY; 6	PHO; 20	LVS; 16	BRI; 18	CAL; 16	TEX; 25	RCH; 25	TAL; 24	DAR; 31	IOW; 29	CLT; 20	DOV; 16	MCH; 21	ROA; 30	KEN; 23	DAY; 15	NHA; 20	CHI; 25	IND; 29	IOW; 22	GLN	CGV; 14	BRI; 12	ATL; 18	RCH; 19	CHI; 18	KEN; 23	DOV	CLT	KAN	TEX	PHO	HOM			15th	609	

==== Camping World Truck Series ====
NASCAR Camping World Truck Series results
Year	Team	No.	Make	1	2	3	4	5	6	7	8	9	10	11	12	13	14	15	16	17	18	19	20	21	22	23	24	25	NCWTC	Pts	Ref
2008	Cunningham Motorsports	41	Dodge	DAY	CAL	ATL	MAR	KAN	CLT	MFD	DOV	TEX	MCH	MLW	MEM	KEN	IRP	NSH	BRI; 36	GTW	NHA	LVS	TAL	MAR; DNQ	ATL	TEX	PHO		71st	155	
2008	Bill Davis Racing	24	Toyota																									HOM; 21	71st	155	
2009	Randy Moss Motorsports	81	Toyota	DAY; 10	CAL; 24	ATL; 13	MAR; 14	KAN; 11	CLT; 8	DOV; 12	TEX; 9	MCH; 6	MLW; 7	MEM; 16	KEN; 13	IRP; 7	NSH; 9	BRI; 31	CHI; 23	IOW; 10	GTW; 5	NHA; 20	LVS; 10	MAR; 28	TAL; 27	TEX; 18	PHO; 17	HOM; 15	12th	3026	
2010	Kyle Busch Motorsports	56	Toyota	DAY; 17	ATL; 13	MAR; 14	NSH; 17	KAN; 22	DOV; 20	CLT; 13	TEX	MCH	IOW	GTY	IRP	POC	NSH	DAR	BRI	CHI	KEN	NHA							23rd	1265	
2010	Randy Moss Motorsports	25	Toyota																				LVS; 13	MAR	TAL	TEX; 21	PHO; 18	HOM; 10	23rd	1265	
2011	Randy Moss Motorsports	25	Toyota	DAY; DNQ	PHO; DNQ	DAR; 29	MAR	NSH	DOV	CLT	KAN	TEX	KEN	IOW	NSH	IRP	POC	MCH	BRI	ATL	CHI	NHA	KEN	LVS	TAL	MAR	TEX	HOM	71st	15	
2014	Turner Scott Motorsports	32	Chevy	DAY	MAR	KAN; 5	CLT; 25	DOV	TEX; 13	GTW; 10	KEN; 13	IOW; 23	ELD	POC	MCH; 4	BRI	MSP	CHI; 23	NHA	LVS; 9	TAL; 2	MAR	TEX; 21	PHO	HOM; 19				21st	362	

^{*} Season still in progress
^{1} Ineligible for series points

=== ARCA Re/Max Series ===
(key) (Bold – Pole position awarded by qualifying time. Italics – Pole position earned by points standings or practice time. * – Most laps led.)

ARCA Re/Max Series results
Year	Team	No.	Make	1	2	3	4	5	6	7	8	9	10	11	12	13	14	15	16	17	18	19	20	21	22	23	ARSC	Pts	Ref
2007	Mark Gibson Racing	56	Dodge	DAY	USA	NSH	SLM	KAN	WIN	KEN	TOL	IOW	POC	MCH	BLN	KEN	POC	NSH	ISF	MIL	GTW	DSF	CHI	SLM	TAL	TOL; 33	166th	65	
2008	Cunningham Motorsports	4	Dodge	DAY; 18	SLM; 31	IOW; 10	KAN; 14	CAR; 14	KEN; 11	TOL; 13	POC; 3	MCH; 18	CAY; 11	KEN; 19	BLN; 12	POC; 22	NSH; 13	ISF; 5	DSF; 13	CHI; 39	SLM; 20	NJE; 3	TAL; 37	TOL; 8			9th	4410	
