= Chrissy Wallace =

American racing driver (born 1988)

- Born: May 15, 1988 (age 38); St. Louis, Missouri, U.S.
- Achievements: 2011 ASA West Region champion

NASCAR O'Reilly Auto Parts Series career
- 2 races run over 1 year
- Best finish: 106th (2010)
- First race: 2010 DRIVE4COPD 300 (Daytona)
- Last race: 2010 Aaron's 312 (Talladega)
Wins	Top tens	Poles
0	0	0

NASCAR FedEx Freight Truck Series career
- 7 races run over 2 years
- Best finish: 42nd (2008)
- First race: 2008 Kroger 250 (Martinsville)
- Last race: 2009 Mountain Dew 250 (Talladega)
Wins	Top tens	Poles
0	0	0
- Statistics up to date as of December 2, 2011.

Chrissy Wallace (born May 15, 1988) is an American stock car racing driver. She is the daughter of NASCAR driver Mike Wallace, niece of Rusty Wallace and Kenny Wallace, cousin of Steve Wallace, and sister of Matt Wallace.

== Racing career ==
At the age of 19 in 2007, Wallace became the first female driver to ever win at Hickory Motor Speedway in North Carolina.

Wallace made her NASCAR Craftsman Truck Series debut in March 2008 at Martinsville Speedway, finishing 18th in the No. 03 Toyota for Germain Racing. She raced in six races that season. In 2009, Wallace finished a career-best 13th in the Mountain Dew 250 at Talladega Superspeedway in the No. 08 Chevrolet for SS-Green Light Racing.

In 2010, Wallace made her NASCAR Nationwide Series debut in the DRIVE4COPD 300 at Daytona. Driving the No. 41 Chevrolet, she started 35th and finished 43rd after crashing on the first lap. Wallace also made the Aaron's 312 at Talladega, finishing 24th in the No. 0 for JD Motorsports.

In 2011, Wallace became the first woman to win an American Speed Association Late Model track championship at Lebanon I-44 Speedway, the same track where her father Mike won the championship in 1990.

== Motorsports career results ==
=== NASCAR ===
(key) (Bold – Pole position awarded by qualifying time. Italics – Pole position earned by points standings or practice time. * – Most laps led.)

==== Nationwide Series ====
NASCAR Nationwide Series results
Year	Team	No.	Make	1	2	3	4	5	6	7	8	9	10	11	12	13	14	15	16	17	18	19	20	21	22	23	24	25	26	27	28	29	30	31	32	33	34	35	NNSC	Pts	Ref
2010	Rick Ware Racing	41	Chevy	DAY; 43	CAL	LVS	BRI	NSH	PHO	TEX																													106th	125	
2010	JD Motorsports	0	Chevy								TAL; 24	RCH	DAR	DOV	CLT	NSH	KEN	ROA	NHA	DAY	CHI	GTY	IRP	IOW	GLN	MCH	BRI	CGV	ATL	RCH	DOV	KAN	CAL	CLT	GTY	TEX	PHO	HOM	106th	125	

==== Camping World Truck Series ====
NASCAR Camping World Truck Series results
Year	Team	No.	Make	1	2	3	4	5	6	7	8	9	10	11	12	13	14	15	16	17	18	19	20	21	22	23	24	25	NCWTC	Pts	Ref
2008	Germain Racing	03	Toyota	DAY	CAL	ATL	MAR; 18	KAN	CLT	MFD	DOV	TEX	MCH	MLW; 20	MEM	KEN; 33	IRP	NSH	BRI	GTW; 19	NHA	LVS	TAL	MAR					42nd	540	
2008	Germain Racing	9	Toyota																						ATL; 25	TEX	PHO	HOM; 31	42nd	540	
2009	SS-Green Light Racing	08	Chevy	DAY	CAL	ATL	MAR	KAN	CLT	DOV	TEX	MCH	MLW	MEM	KEN	IRP	NSH	BRI	CHI	IOW	GTW	NHA	LVS	MAR	TAL; 13	TEX	PHO	HOM	81st	124	

=== ARCA Racing Series ===
(key) (Bold – Pole position awarded by qualifying time. Italics – Pole position earned by points standings or practice time. * – Most laps led.)

ARCA Racing Series results
Year	Team	No.	Make	1	2	3	4	5	6	7	8	9	10	11	12	13	14	15	16	17	18	19	20	21	ARSC	Pts	Ref
2008	Hattori Racing Enterprises	01	Toyota	DAY	SLM	IOW	KAN	CAR	KEN	TOL	POC	MCH	CAY	KEN	BLN	POC; 39	NSH	ISF	DSF	CHI	SLM	NJE			87th	220	
2008	Germain Racing	18	Toyota																				TAL; 9	TOL	87th	220	
2011	Cunningham Motorsports	22	Dodge	DAY	TAL	SLM	TOL	NJE	CHI	POC	MCH	WIN	BLN	IOW	IRP	POC	ISF	MAD	DSF	SLM	KAN	TOL; 11			100th	175	
