= GunBroker.com =

Auction website

- Website type: Shopping / Auctions / Specialty
- Available in: English
- Parent: Outdoor Holding Company
- Website: www.gunbroker.com
- Commercial: Yes
- Registration: Optional
- Users: 7.7 million
- Launched: 19 February 1999; 27 years ago
- Current status: Active

GunBroker.com is an auction website for firearms and shooting accessories.

== History ==
Established in 1999, GunBroker.com is one of the world's largest online marketplace for firearms.

GunBroker.com was founded by Steven F. Urvan after eBay started restricting gun sales. Urvan ran the company until it was acquired by Ammo, Inc in 2021. At the closing of merger, it had $60 million in revenue and 6 million registered users.

AMMO, Inc. suspended the CFO of GunBroker.com, Susan Lokey, in September 2022. AMMO, Inc. alleged that Lokey, working with Urvan, misused company data by transferring it to an entity that she was affiliated with.

In 2023, Steven Urvan sued AMMO, Inc claiming it duped him into selling GunBroker.com for $240 million in exchange for 17% stake in the company.

On July 28, 2024, now-parent company AMMO, Inc. appointed Jared Smith as the company's Chief Executive Officer. Fred Wagenhals is Chairman of GunBroker.com via AMMO, Inc.

AMMO, Inc. sold its ammunition manufacturing assets to Olin Winchester in March 2025; as part of the sale it also rebranded to Outdoor Holding Company. On May 30, 2025, Steven Urvan was appointed as the chairman and CEO of Outdoor Holding Company as part of a settlement agreement.

GunBroker.com has sometimes been used to study trends in firearm sales.

== Sponsorships ==
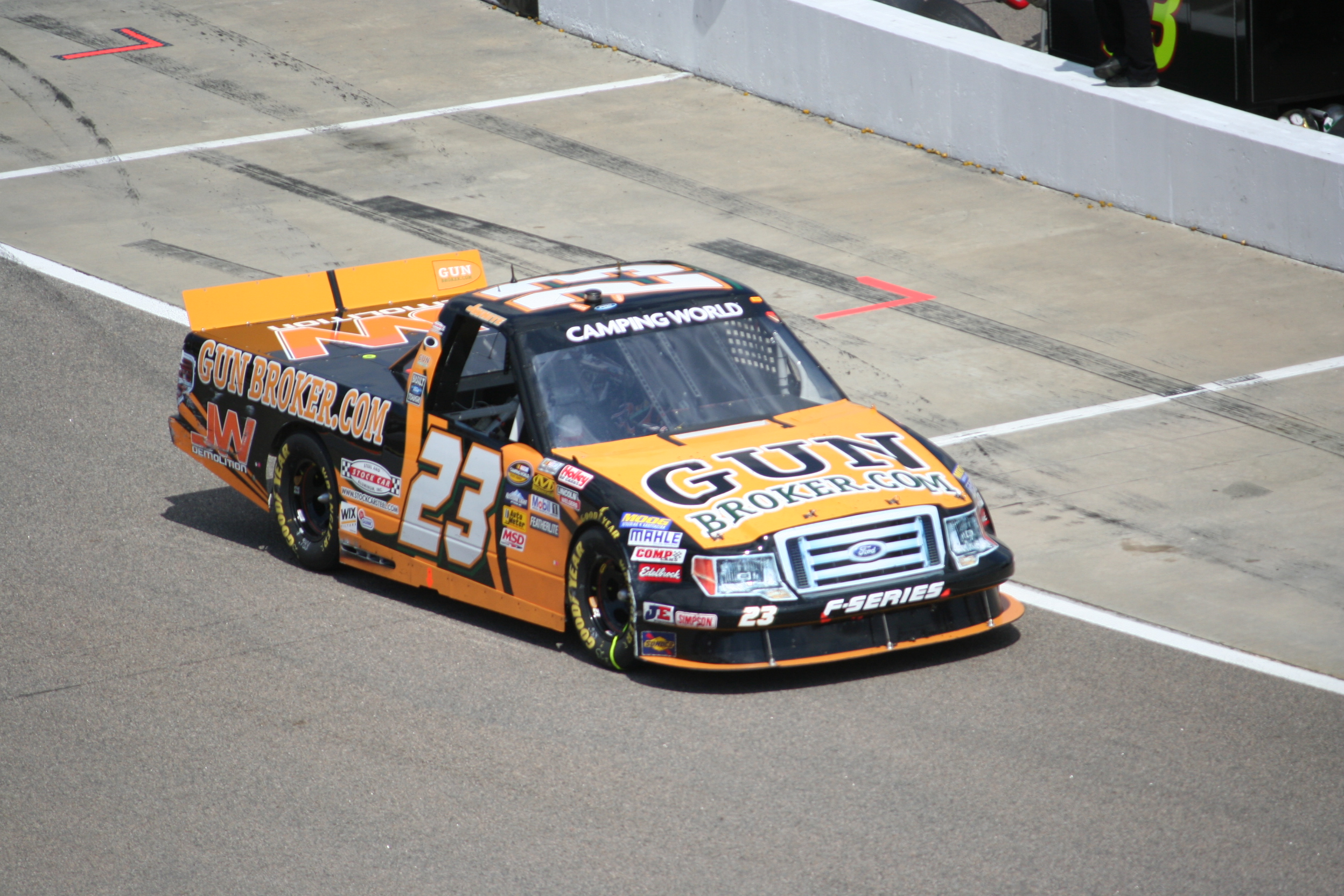
2012 NASCAR truck with GunBroker.com decals

GunBroker.com has been a sponsor for various NASCAR teams since 2004. GunBroker.com was the primary sponsor of NASCAR Camping World Truck Series driver Jason White, driver of the No. 23 Truck from 2008-2012.

GunBroker.com partnered with USA Shooting for the Olympics. Several lawmakers called out to the Olympics to cut ties with GunBroker.com because of Nazi memorabilia listed for sale on GunBroker.com.
