= NASCAR Camping World Truck Series at Auto Club Speedway =

American motor racing event

San Bernardino County 200

NASCAR Camping World Truck Series
- Venue: Auto Club Speedway
- Location: Fontana, California, United States
- Corporate sponsor: San Bernardino County
- First race: 1997
- Last race: 2009
- Distance: 200 miles (320 km)
- Laps: 100
- Previous names: The No Fear Challenge (1997–1998); NAPA Auto Parts 200 (1999); Motorola 200 (2000); Auto Club 200 (2001); American Racing Wheels 200 (2002–2005) racetickets.com 200 (2006); San Bernardino County 200 (2007–2009)
- Most wins (driver): Ted Musgrave (3)
- Most wins (team): Ultra Motorsports (4)
- Most wins (manufacturer): Dodge and Toyota (4)

Circuit information
- Surface: Asphalt
- Length: 2.0 mi (3.2 km)
- Turns: 4

The San Bernardino County 200 was a NASCAR Camping World Truck Series race held at Auto Club Speedway in Fontana, California. It was first held in 1997, the year Auto Club Speedway opened, and last held in 2009. The race had been held as the second race of the Truck Series season since 2005, but was removed from the schedule after 2009 in order to save teams money in travel costs, no longer forcing them to travel from east coast to west coast for a race.

== Race history ==
=== 2001 ===
The 2001 event, won by Ted Musgrave (with Jack Sprague clinching that year's Truck Series title), featured a last-minute driver change after the practice sessions. Because it was held as part of CART Marlboro 500 weekend, Phillip Morris (manufacturer of Marlboro) officials ejected the then-16 year old Kyle Busch, driving for Roush Racing after the practice session for the Truck Series event, citing an interpretation of the 1998 Tobacco Master Settlement Agreement that prohibited any person under 18 years of age (the federal smoking age at the time) from participating in events sponsored by tobacco companies; Busch was replaced by Tim Woods III for the rest of the race. For the 2002 season, NASCAR set a minimum age limit of 18 across all top three national series, partially because Winston was the series sponsor of its premier NASCAR Cup Series at the time. NASCAR has since allowed 16 and 17-year old drivers to compete in the Truck Series on short ovals (under 1.25 miles (2.01 km) long) and road courses after Winston left the sport.

=== 2008 ===
No qualifying segment took place. The field was set by owners points; Ron Hornaday Jr. started in first place. The race was dominated by Toyota; Daytona truck race runner-up Kyle Busch won the race in the No. 51 Toyota followed by Todd Bodine, Johnny Benson Jr., and Terry Cook in second, third, and fourth respectively in their Toyotas. Between Busch, Bodine, and Benson, Toyota led 79 out of 100 laps in the race; eight out of nine Toyotas in the field finished in the top 13. Ron Hornaday, Jr. led 15 laps and finished in fifth place; the highest-finishing place for Chevrolet in the race. Travis Kvapil led one lap and finished 7th in his No. 09 Ford. Dennis Setzer, in his No. 18 Dodge, led 3 laps and finished 16th.

=== 2009 ===
Kyle Busch, last year's winner, won the pole. With Johnny Benson starting second, two Toyota Tundras started at the front row followed by two Chevrolet Silverados driven by rookie Ricky Carmichael and Ron Hornaday in the second row. Mike Harmon fails to qualify. Busch led the opening laps. First caution: Mike Skinner taps into Brian Scott, sending Scott to the outside wall before the start/finish line. Lap 35, Norm Benning (No. 57) ran out of fuel, stopping his racing truck away from the backstretch to prevent a caution. Lap 45, second caution came out due to engine problems of the No. 25 of Terry Cook. Lap 50, halfway, Busch continued to lead laps and pull away from the field. Lap 86, green flag pit stops ensue; Mike Bliss (No. 40) ran out of fuel, but was able to make to pit road. Lap 90, Busch pits and took fuel only; David Starr took fuel only in his pitstop, also, moved up in positions as a result. Lap 96, Tayler Malsam (No. 81) ran out of fuel; no caution. Kyle Busch, with a ten-second lead, won race for the second time in a row; his tenth career truck win. Busch led 95 of 100 laps. Daytona truck race winner Todd Bodine finishes in second place, also, for the second time in a row. David Starr finished 4th. Rookie Ricky Carmichael finishes in 8th place.

== Past winners ==
Year	Date	Driver	Team	Manufacturer	Race Distance		Race Time	Average Speed (mph)	Report	Ref
Year	Date	Driver	Team	Manufacturer	Laps	Miles (km)	Race Time	Average Speed (mph)	Report	Ref
1997	October 18	Mike Bliss	Ultra Motorsports	Ford	100	200 (321.868)	1:37:28	137.195	Report	
1998	July 18	Jack Sprague	Hendrick Motorsports	Chevrolet	100	200 (321.868)	1:24:36	141.844	Report	
1999	October 30	Jack Sprague	Hendrick Motorsports	Chevrolet	100	200 (321.868)	1:33:41	128.091	Report	
2000	October 28	Kurt Busch	Roush Racing	Ford	100	200 (321.868)	1:23:11	144.26	Report	
2001	November 3	Ted Musgrave	Ultra Motorsports	Dodge	100	200 (321.868)	1:45:55	113.297	Report	
2002	November 2	Ted Musgrave	Ultra Motorsports	Dodge	100	200 (321.868)	1:25:32	140.296	Report	
2003	September 20	Ted Musgrave	Ultra Motorsports	Dodge	100	200 (321.868)	1:22:14	145.926	Report	
2004	October 2	Todd Bodine	Germain Racing	Toyota	100	200 (321.868)	1:34:23	127.141	Report	
2005	February 25	Steve Park	Orleans Racing	Dodge	100	200 (321.868)	1:33:45	128	Report	
2006	February 24	Mark Martin	Roush Racing	Ford	106*	212 (341.18)	1:44:40	121.529	Report	
2007	February 23	Mike Skinner	Bill Davis Racing	Toyota	100	200 (321.868)	1:31:39	130.933	Report	
2008	February 23*	Kyle Busch	Billy Ballew Motorsports	Toyota	100	200 (321.868)	1:22:00	146.341	Report	
2009	February 21	Kyle Busch	Billy Ballew Motorsports	Toyota	100	200 (321.868)	1:22:17	145.838	Report	

- 2006: Race extended due to a green–white–checker finish.
- 2008: Race postponed from Friday night to Saturday afternoon due to rain.

=== Multiple winners (drivers) ===
# Wins	Driver	Years won
3	Ted Musgrave	2001, 2002, 2003
2	Jack Sprague	1998, 1999
2	Kyle Busch	2008, 2009

=== Multiple winners (teams) ===
# Wins	Team	Years won
4	Ultra Motorsports	1997, 2001, 2002, 2003
2	Hendrick Motorsports	1998, 1999
2	Roush Racing	2000, 2006
2	Billy Ballew Motorsports	2008, 2009

=== Manufacturer wins ===
# Wins	Make	Years won
4	(United States) Dodge	2001, 2002, 2003, 2005
4	(Japan) Toyota	2004, 2007, 2008, 2009
3	(United States) Ford	1997, 2000, 2006
2	(United States) Chevrolet	1998, 1999
