= Michael Abrams =

Michael or Mike Abrams may refer to:

- Michael Abrams (boxer) (born 1949), English light-flyweight boxer
- Mike Abrams (criminal) (died 1898), New York criminal and underworld figure
- Mike Abrams (politician) (born 1947), member of the Florida House of Representatives
- Mike Abrams (psychologist) (born 1953), American psychologist
- M. H. Abrams (1912–2015), American literary critic, also known as Mike Abrams

== See also ==
- Mike Abram (born 1979), American racing driver
- Michael Abram (born c. 1966), the perpetrator of the 1999 stabbing of George Harrison
