= Dale Matchett =

Dale Matchett may refer to:

- Dale Matchett (curler)
- Dale Matchett (racing driver)
