= J. J. Pack =

American racing driver

- Born: December 22, 1976 (age 49); Haymarket, Virginia, U.S.

ARCA Menards Series career
- 4 races run over 5 years
- Best finish: 81st (2019)
- First race: 2015 Lucas Oil 200 (Daytona)
- Last race: 2020 Lucas Oil 200 (Daytona)
Wins	Top tens	Poles
0	0	0
- Statistics up to date as of January 30, 2025.

J. J. Pack (born December 22, 1976) is an American professional stock car racing driver who has previously competed in the ARCA Menards Series from 2015 to 2020.

Pack has also competed in the X-1R Pro Cup Series, the Grand National Super Series, and the Super Cup Stock Car Series.

== Motorsports results ==
=== ARCA Menards Series ===
(key) (Bold – Pole position awarded by qualifying time. Italics – Pole position earned by points standings or practice time. * – Most laps led.)

ARCA Menards Series results
Year	Team	No.	Make	1	2	3	4	5	6	7	8	9	10	11	12	13	14	15	16	17	18	19	20	AMSC	Pts	Ref
2015	Mullins Racing	1	Ford	DAY; 36	MOB	NSH	SLM	TAL	TOL	NJE	POC	MCH	CHI	WIN	IOW	IRP								94th	190	
2015	George Cushman Racing	7	Chevy														POC; 18	BLN	ISF	DSF	SLM	KEN	KAN	94th	190	
2016	George Cushman Racing	13	Chevy	DAY; DNQ	NSH	SLM	TAL	TOL	NJE	POC	MCH	MAD	WIN	IOW	IRP	POC	BLN	ISF	DSF	SLM	CHI	KEN	KAN	N/A	0	
2018	J. J. Pack Racing	61	Toyota	DAY	NSH	SLM	TAL	TOL	CLT	POC	MCH	MAD	GTW	CHI	IOW	ELK	POC; Wth	ISF	BLN	DSF	SLM	IRP	KAN; Wth	N/A	0	
2019	J. J. Pack Racing	61	Toyota	DAY; 28	FIF	SLM	TAL	NSH	TOL	CLT	POC	MCH	MAD	GTW	CHI	ELK	IOW	POC; Wth	ISF	DSF	SLM	IRP	KAN	81st	90	
2020	J. J. Pack Racing	61	Toyota	DAY; 24	PHO	TAL	POC	IRP	KEN	IOW	KAN	TOL	TOL	MCH	DAY	GTW	L44	TOL	BRI	WIN	MEM	ISF	KAN	84th	20	
