= Matt Wallace =

Matt Wallace may refer to:

- Matt Wallace (record producer), American record producer
- Matt Wallace (racing driver), American race car driver
- Matt Wallace (golfer), English golfer
