= 2015 ARCA Racing Series =

Racing season

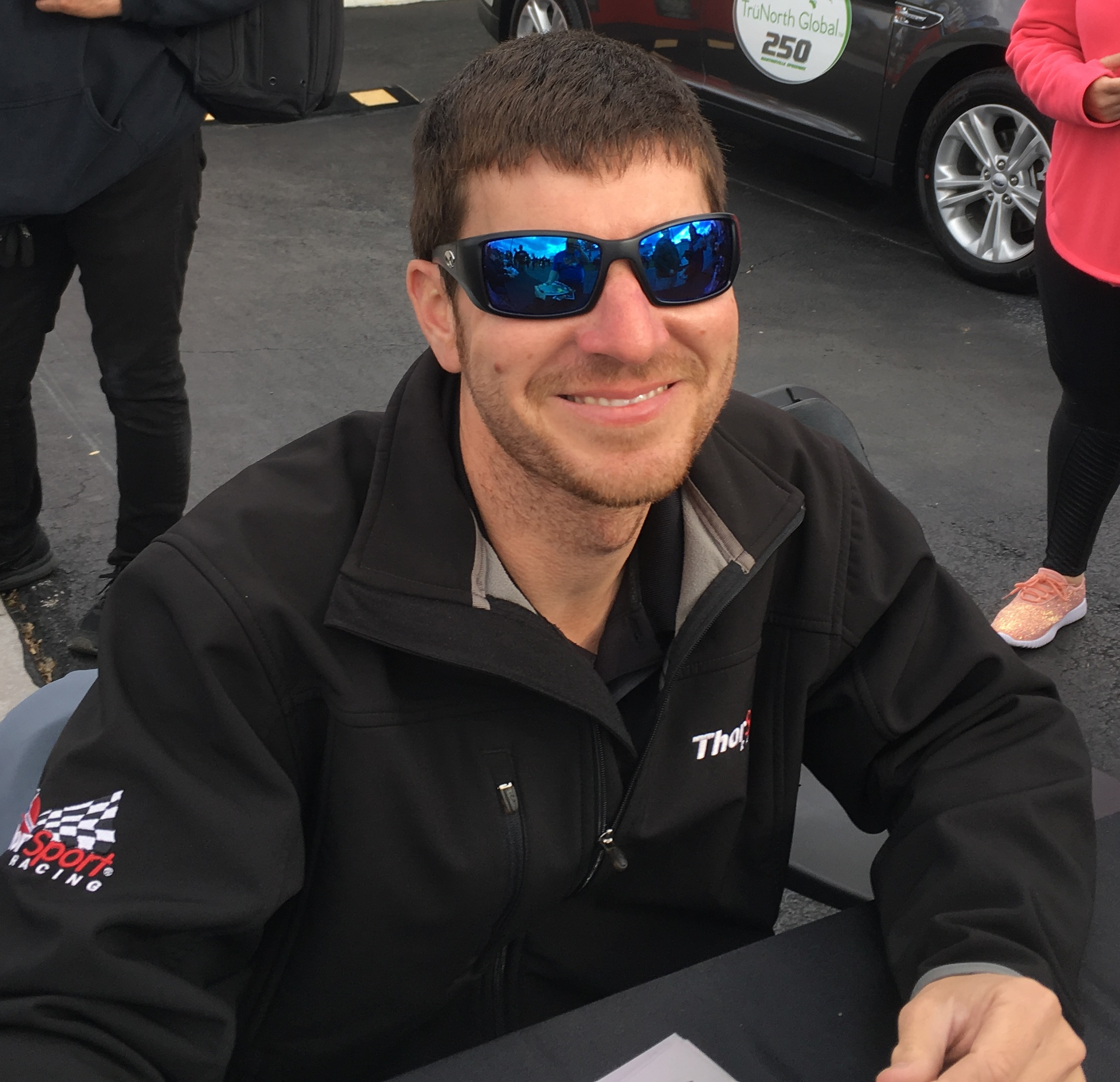
Grant Enfinger, the 2015 ARCA champion.

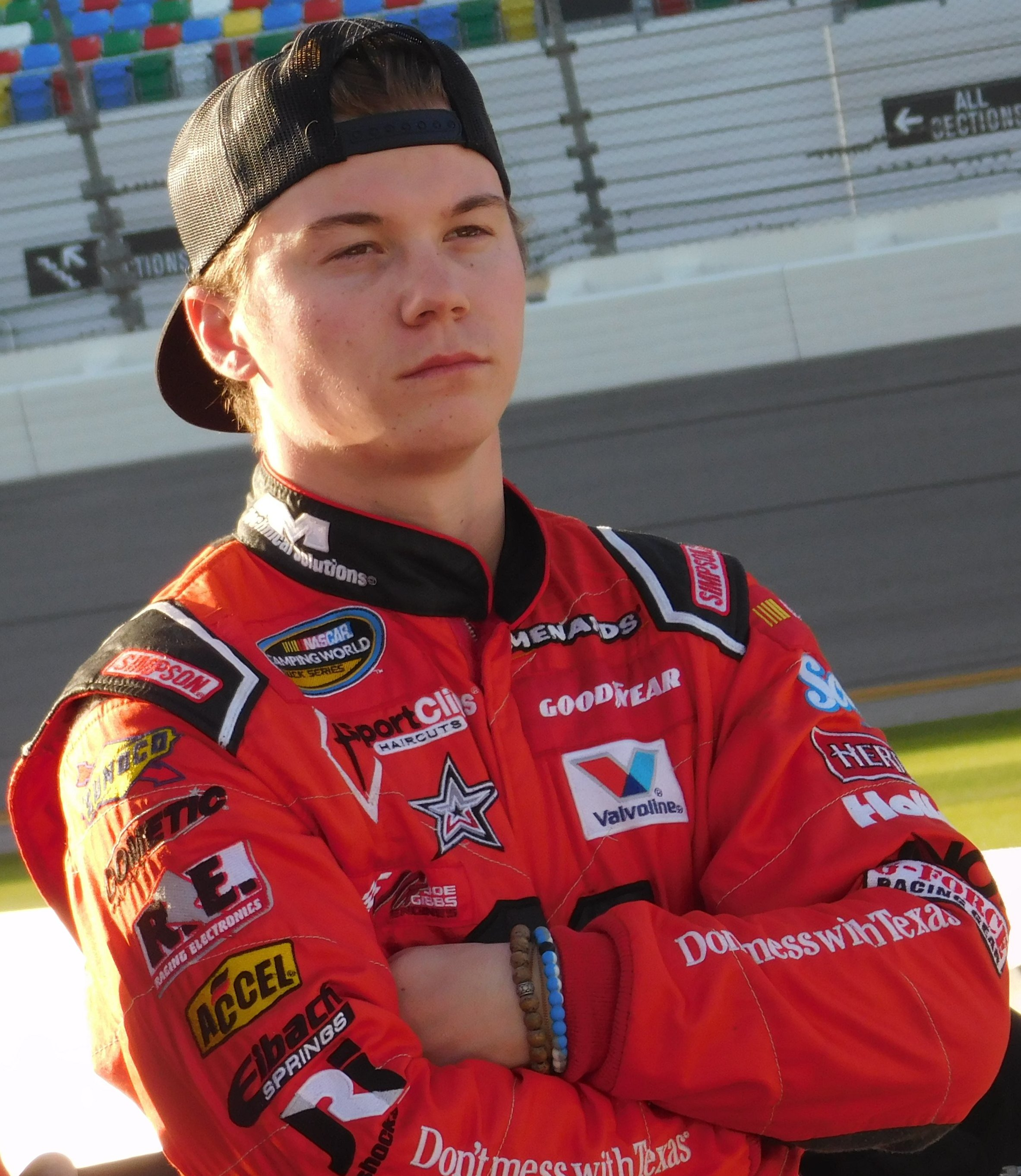
Austin Wayne Self finished second behind Enfinger in the championship.

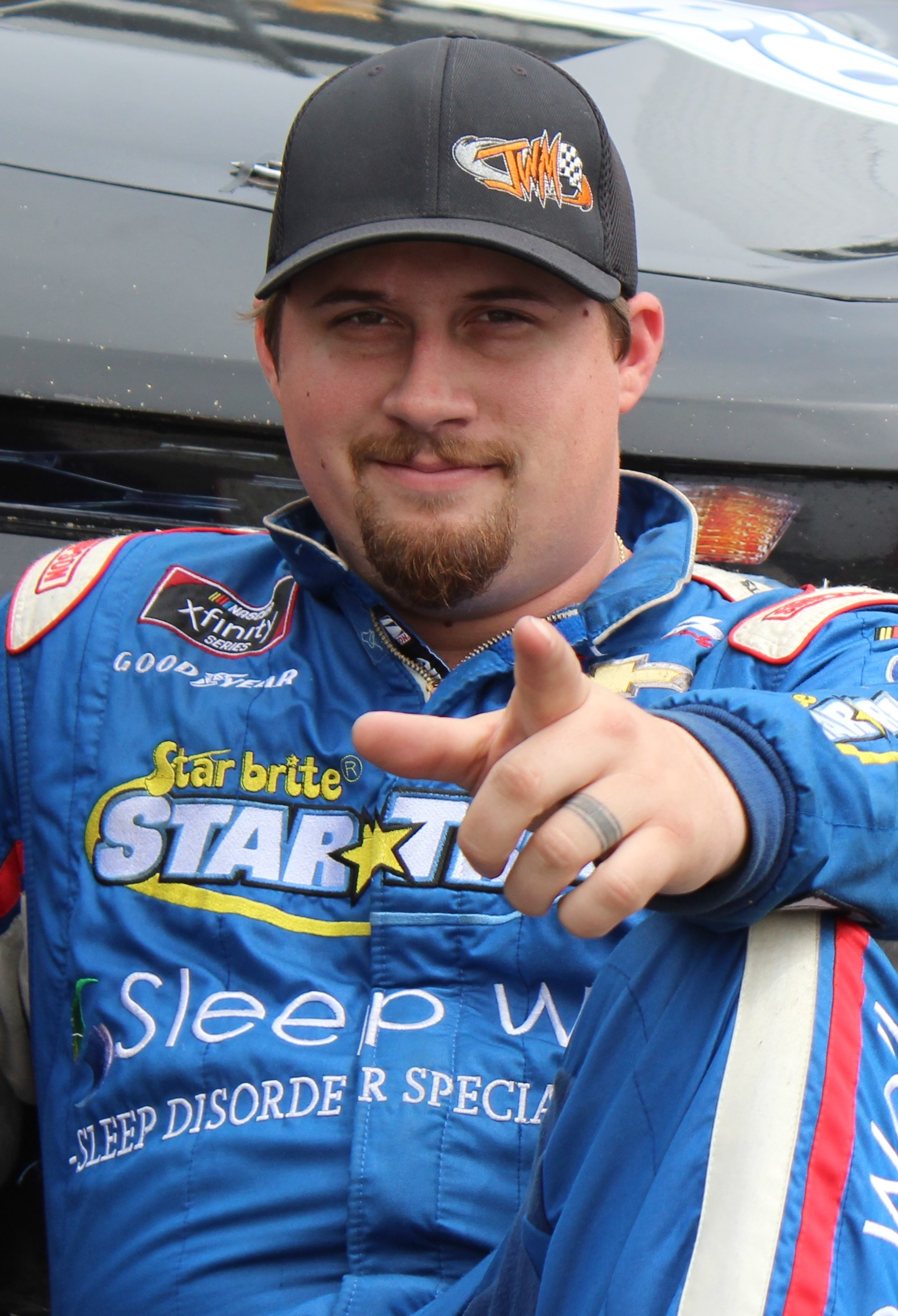
Josh Williams finished third in the championship.

The 2015 ARCA Racing Series presented by Menards was the 63rd season of the ARCA Racing Series. The season began on February 14 with the Lucas Oil 200 presented by Autozone and ended October 16 with the Full Throttle S'loonshine 98.9.

The championship was won by GMS Racing driver Grant Enfinger, who won a series-high six races during the season, including the first three of the season at Daytona, Mobile and the Nashville Fairgrounds. Enfinger finished 425 points clear of his nearest rival for the title, Mason Mitchell Motorsports' Austin Wayne Self, who passed Josh Williams (Josh Williams Motorsports) for the runner-up position at the final race. Self finished outside the top fifteen on only two occasions, and won one race during the season, at Winchester; while Williams recorded no fewer than fifteen top-ten finishes but was unable to break into victory lane.

The only other driver inside the top ten in the final championship standings to take a race victory was Kyle Weatherman, for the Cunningham Motorsports team. Weatherman was the race winner at the New Jersey Motorsports Park road course, and despite missing a quarter of the races in 2015, Weatherman was able to finish in tenth place in the final championship standings. Ten other drivers won races during the 2015 season; Mason Mitchell and Ryan Reed each won two races, while A. J. Fike, Ken Schrader, Blake Jones, Travis Braden, Cole Custer, Trevor Bayne, Ross Kenseth and Todd Gilliland all made one visit to victory lane.

== Teams and drivers ==
=== Complete schedule ===
Manufacturer	Team	No.	Driver
Chevrolet	GMS Racing	23	Grant Enfinger
Chevrolet	RACE 101 with Hixson Motorsports	2	Sarah Cornett-Ching (R)
Chevrolet	RACE 101 with Hixson Motorsports	3	Karl Weber 1
Chevrolet	A2 Motorsports	3	Allen Milton 1
Chevrolet	Hixson Motorsports	3	Josh White (R) 16
Dodge	Universe Racing	3	Steve Fox 2
Dodge	Carter 2 Motorsports	97	Bobby Hamilton Jr. 10
Dodge	Carter 2 Motorsports	97	Eric Caudell 1
Dodge	Carter 2 Motorsports	97	Richard Altman 1
Dodge	Carter 2 Motorsports	97	Chris Lafferty 1
Dodge	Carter 2 Motorsports	97	Ray Ciccarelli 1
Dodge	Carter 2 Motorsports	97	Matt Vainner 1
Dodge	Carter 2 Motorsports	97	Alex Clubb 2
Ford	Lira Motorsports	58	John Lowinski-Loh 1
Ford	Lira Motorsports	58	Michael Lira 9
Ford	Lira Motorsports	58	Cole Powell 2
Ford	Lira Motorsports	58	Ryan Reed 1
Ford	Lira Motorsports	58	Jairo Avila Jr. 1
Ford	Lira Motorsports	58	Blake Jones (R) 2
Ford	Lira Motorsports	58	Tyler Dippel 2
Ford	Lira Motorsports	58	Brandon Lynn 2
Ford	Lira Motorsports	59	David Levine (R)
Ford	Max Force Racing	9	Thomas Praytor 19
Ford	Max Force Racing	9	Mike Abram 1
Toyota	Venturini Motorsports	15	Daniel Suárez 4
Toyota	Venturini Motorsports	15	Frankie Kimmel 1
Toyota	Venturini Motorsports	15	Frank Kimmel 1
Toyota	Venturini Motorsports	15	Brian Wong 1
Toyota	Venturini Motorsports	15	Kyle Benjamin 1
Toyota	Venturini Motorsports	25	Frank Kimmel 10
Toyota	Venturini Motorsports	25	Brandon Jones (R) 10
Toyota	Venturini Motorsports	55	Cody Coughlin 6
Toyota	Venturini Motorsports	55	Dominic Ursetta 2
Toyota	Venturini Motorsports	55	Clay Greenfield 1
Toyota	Venturini Motorsports	55	Todd Gilliland 2
Toyota	Venturini Motorsports	55	Justin Boston 2
Toyota	Venturini Motorsports	55	William Byron 2
Toyota	Venturini Motorsports	55	Austin Theriault 1
Toyota	Venturini Motorsports	55	Mason Mitchell 1
Toyota	Venturini Motorsports	55	Matt Tifft 1
Toyota	Venturini Motorsports	55	Frankie Kimmel 1
Toyota	Venturini Motorsports	55	Daniel Suárez 1
Chevrolet 2 Dodge 9 Ford 9	Fast Track Racing 1 Wayne Peterson Racing 19	06	Ed Pompa 1
Chevrolet 2 Dodge 9 Ford 9	Fast Track Racing 1 Wayne Peterson Racing 19	06	James Swanson 4
Chevrolet 2 Dodge 9 Ford 9	Fast Track Racing 1 Wayne Peterson Racing 19	06	Mike Abram 1
Chevrolet 2 Dodge 9 Ford 9	Fast Track Racing 1 Wayne Peterson Racing 19	06	Don Thompson 2
Chevrolet 2 Dodge 9 Ford 9	Fast Track Racing 1 Wayne Peterson Racing 19	06	Con Nicolopoulos 10
Chevrolet 2 Dodge 9 Ford 9	Fast Track Racing 1 Wayne Peterson Racing 19	06	Tyler Miles 1
Chevrolet 2 Dodge 9 Ford 9	Fast Track Racing 1 Wayne Peterson Racing 19	06	Tim Viens 1
Chevrolet 6 Ford 14	Rick Ware Racing 1 Fast Track Racing 16; Weatherman Motorsports 3	10	Garrett Smithley 1 (Note: It was a Rick Ware Racing entry using Fast Track Racing's owner points.)
Chevrolet 6 Ford 14	Rick Ware Racing 1 Fast Track Racing 16; Weatherman Motorsports 3	10	Dick Doheny 2
Chevrolet 6 Ford 14	Rick Ware Racing 1 Fast Track Racing 16; Weatherman Motorsports 3	10	Rick Clifton 4
Chevrolet 6 Ford 14	Rick Ware Racing 1 Fast Track Racing 16; Weatherman Motorsports 3	10	Clayton Weatherman 3 (Note: It was a Weatherman Motorsports entry using Fast Track Racing's owner points.)
Chevrolet 6 Ford 14	Rick Ware Racing 1 Fast Track Racing 16; Weatherman Motorsports 3	10	Ed Pompa 10
Chevrolet 4 Ford 16	Wayne Peterson Racing 19; Dale Shearer Racing 1	0	James Swanson 1
Chevrolet 4 Ford 16	Wayne Peterson Racing 19; Dale Shearer Racing 1	0	Cory Howard 1
Chevrolet 4 Ford 16	Wayne Peterson Racing 19; Dale Shearer Racing 1	0	Tim Viens 1
Chevrolet 4 Ford 16	Wayne Peterson Racing 19; Dale Shearer Racing 1	0	Con Nicolopoulos 3
Chevrolet 4 Ford 16	Wayne Peterson Racing 19; Dale Shearer Racing 1	0	Barry Fitzgerald 1
Chevrolet 4 Ford 16	Wayne Peterson Racing 19; Dale Shearer Racing 1	0	Dale Matchett 2
Chevrolet 4 Ford 16	Wayne Peterson Racing 19; Dale Shearer Racing 1	0	Tommy O'Leary IV 1
Chevrolet 4 Ford 16	Wayne Peterson Racing 19; Dale Shearer Racing 1	0	Wayne Peterson 7
Chevrolet 4 Ford 16	Wayne Peterson Racing 19; Dale Shearer Racing 1	0	Don Thompson 1
Chevrolet 4 Ford 16	Wayne Peterson Racing 19; Dale Shearer Racing 1	0	Mike Abram 1
Chevrolet 4 Ford 16	Wayne Peterson Racing 19; Dale Shearer Racing 1	0	Dale Shearer 1
Chevrolet 15 Toyota 5	Ken Schrader Racing	52	Clay Campbell 2
Chevrolet 15 Toyota 5	Ken Schrader Racing	52	Matt Tifft 8
Chevrolet 15 Toyota 5	Ken Schrader Racing	52	Ken Schrader 7
Chevrolet 15 Toyota 5	Ken Schrader Racing	52	Ross Kenseth 2
Chevrolet 15 Toyota 5	Ken Schrader Racing	52	Hunter Baize 2
Dodge 13 Chevrolet 4 Ford 2	Carter 2 Motorsports	40	Roger Carter 1
Dodge 13 Chevrolet 4 Ford 2	Carter 2 Motorsports	40	Ronnie Osmer 1
Dodge 13 Chevrolet 4 Ford 2	Carter 2 Motorsports	40	Richard Altman 1
Dodge 13 Chevrolet 4 Ford 2	Carter 2 Motorsports	40	Brandon McKenzie 2
Dodge 13 Chevrolet 4 Ford 2	Carter 2 Motorsports	40	Eric Caudell 4
Dodge 13 Chevrolet 4 Ford 2	Carter 2 Motorsports	40	Scott Edwards 1
Dodge 13 Chevrolet 4 Ford 2	Carter 2 Motorsports	40	David Sear 1
Dodge 13 Chevrolet 4 Ford 2	Carter 2 Motorsports	40	Andy Seuss 1
Dodge 13 Chevrolet 4 Ford 2	Carter 2 Motorsports	40	Alex Clubb 1
Dodge 13 Chevrolet 4 Ford 2	Carter 2 Motorsports	40	Jordan Williams 1
Dodge 13 Chevrolet 4 Ford 2	Carter 2 Motorsports	40	Justin Lloyd 4
Dodge 13 Chevrolet 4 Ford 2	Carter 2 Motorsports	40	Wayne Edwards 1
Dodge 11 Ford 9	Cunningham Motorsports	22	Blake Jones (R) 3
Dodge 11 Ford 9	Cunningham Motorsports	22	Kyle Weatherman (R) 15
Dodge 11 Ford 9	Cunningham Motorsports	22	Trevor Bayne 1
Dodge 11 Ford 9	Cunningham Motorsports	22	Josh Williams 1
Dodge 12 Ford 8	Cunningham Motorsports	77	Tom Hessert III
Dodge 17 Toyota 3	Crosley Sports Group	42	Bo LeMastus (R)
Ford 6 Chevrolet 8 Dodge 2	Wayne Peterson Racing 17; JR Motorsports 3	00	Barry Fitzgerald 1
Ford 6 Chevrolet 8 Dodge 2	Wayne Peterson Racing 17; JR Motorsports 3	00	Wayne Peterson 6
Ford 6 Chevrolet 8 Dodge 2	Wayne Peterson Racing 17; JR Motorsports 3	00	Tim Viens 2
Ford 6 Chevrolet 8 Dodge 2	Wayne Peterson Racing 17; JR Motorsports 3	00	Dale Matchett 1
Ford 6 Chevrolet 8 Dodge 2	Wayne Peterson Racing 17; JR Motorsports 3	00	Cole Custer 3 (Note: Custer's three races were JR Motorsports entries using Wayne Peterson Racing's owner points. The Peterson team would then field another car, the No. 08, in those same three races.)
Ford 6 Chevrolet 8 Dodge 2	Wayne Peterson Racing 17; JR Motorsports 3	00	Mike Harmon 1
Ford 6 Chevrolet 8 Dodge 2	Wayne Peterson Racing 17; JR Motorsports 3	00	Mike Abram 6
Ford 16 Chevrolet 4	Kimmel Racing 16; Finney Racing Enterprises 4	68	David Levine (R) 1
Ford 16 Chevrolet 4	Kimmel Racing 16; Finney Racing Enterprises 4	68	Brian Finney 4
Ford 16 Chevrolet 4	Kimmel Racing 16; Finney Racing Enterprises 4	68	Mark Meunier (R) 9
Ford 16 Chevrolet 4	Kimmel Racing 16; Finney Racing Enterprises 4	68	Chris Bailey Jr. 3
Ford 16 Chevrolet 4	Kimmel Racing 16; Finney Racing Enterprises 4	68	Shawn Umphries 1
Ford 16 Chevrolet 4	Kimmel Racing 16; Finney Racing Enterprises 4	68	Ray Ciccarelli 1
Ford 16 Chevrolet 4	Kimmel Racing 16; Finney Racing Enterprises 4	68	Nick Higdon 1
Ford 14 Chevrolet 6	Mason Mitchell Motorsports	98	Austin Wayne Self
Ford 3 Chevrolet 16 Dodge 1	Josh Williams Motorsports 19; Tyler Audie Racing 1	6	Josh Williams 19
Ford 3 Chevrolet 16 Dodge 1	Josh Williams Motorsports 19; Tyler Audie Racing 1	6	Tyler Audie 1
Ford 11 Dodge 8	Empire Racing 1 James Hylton Motorsports 19	48	Sean Corr 1
Ford 11 Dodge 8	Empire Racing 1 James Hylton Motorsports 19	48	Brad Smith 4
Ford 11 Dodge 8	Empire Racing 1 James Hylton Motorsports 19	48	Rick Clifton 2
Ford 11 Dodge 8	Empire Racing 1 James Hylton Motorsports 19	48	James Swanson 13
Ford 18 Toyota 2	Kimmel Racing	69	Will Kimmel 17
Ford 18 Toyota 2	Kimmel Racing	69	Matt Wallace 2
Ford 18 Toyota 2	Kimmel Racing	69	James Swanson 1

=== Limited schedule ===
Manufacturer	Team	No.	Driver	Rounds
Chevrolet	Alger Motorsports	70	Billy Alger	1
Chevrolet	Allgaier Motorsports	16	Kelly Kovski	1
Chevrolet	Bob Schacht Motorsports	75	Ginny Quinones	1
Chevrolet	Bob Schacht Motorsports	75	Bob Schacht	1
Chevrolet	Braden Racing	01	Travis Braden	3
Chevrolet	Braun Motorsports	74	Justin Haley	3
Chevrolet	Brother-In-Law Racing	57	Bryan Dauzat	1
Chevrolet	Brother-In-Law Racing	76	Andy Seuss	2
Chevrolet	Darrell Basham Racing	34	Darrell Basham	3
Chevrolet	Darrell Basham Racing	34	Mike Basham	3
Chevrolet	DGM Racing	80	Russ Dugger	3
Chevrolet	Ebert Motorsports	19	David Sear	3
Chevrolet	Finney Racing Enterprises	80	Shawn Szep	1
Chevrolet	Finney Racing Enterprises	80	Scott Reeves	1
Chevrolet	GMS Racing	20	Scott Sheldon	2
Chevrolet	Hendren Motorsports	24	Ryan Unzicker	2
Chevrolet	Hixson Motorsports	8	Josh White	2
Chevrolet	HScott Motorsports with Justin Marks	43	Scott Heckert	1
Chevrolet	KC Motorsports	40	Kevin Campbell	1
Chevrolet	KC Motorsports	81	Kevin Campbell	5
Chevrolet	Kurzejewski Motorsports Inc.	54	Matt Kurzejewski	9
Chevrolet	Lancaster Racing	83	Derrick Lancaster	1
Chevrolet	Littleton Motorsports	5	Mark Littleton	2
Chevrolet	MacZink Racing	65	Jeffery MacZink	1
Chevrolet	Mason Mitchell Motorsports	88	John Wes Townley	1
Chevrolet	Max Force Racing with RACE 101	12	Thomas Praytor	1
Chevrolet	Mike Affarano Motorsports	03	Raymond Hassler	1
Chevrolet	Mike Affarano Motorsports	03	Kevin Rutherford	3
Chevrolet	Mike Buckley Racing	28	Mike Buckley	1
Chevrolet	NTS Motorsports	92	Daniel Hemric	1
Chevrolet	Our Motorsports	7	Tommy Barrett Jr.	1
Chevrolet	George Cushman Racing	7	George Cushman	1
Chevrolet	George Cushman Racing	7	J. J. Pack	1
Chevrolet	Ryan Heavner Racing	14	Ryan Heavner	2
Chevrolet	Team LaCross Motorsports	99	Brent Cross	1
Chevrolet	Tom Berte Racing (Note: Entries were fielded in a collaboration with Venturini Motorsports.)	20	Tom Berte	6
Chevrolet	Universe Racing	86	Nick Igdalsky	1
Chevrolet	Wayne Peterson Racing	08	Mike Abram	1
Chevrolet	Wayne Peterson Racing	08	Tim Viens	1
Chevrolet	Wayne Peterson Racing	08	Dale Matchett	1
Dodge	Brett Hudson Motorsports	09	Brett Hudson	1
Dodge	Carter 2 Motorsports	95	Cassie Gannis	1
Dodge	Carter 2 Motorsports	95	Greg Hutto Jr.	1
Dodge	Carter 2 Motorsports	95	Jordan Williams	2
Dodge	Carter 2 Motorsports	95	Scott Edwards	2
Dodge	Carter 2 Motorsports	95	Emerson Newton-John	1
Dodge	Carter 2 Motorsports	95	Kevin Hinckle	2
Dodge	Carter 2 Motorsports	96	Richard Altman	1
Dodge	Cunningham Motorsports	72	Chase Briscoe	2
Dodge	Hauck Enterprises Inc.	31	Richard Hauck	6
Dodge	J. C. Dubil Racing	89	Brad Dubil	1
Dodge	NDS Motorsports	53	Robert Mitten	1
Dodge	James Hylton Motorsports	38	James Swanson	1
Ford	James Hylton Motorsports	49	Brad Smith	1
Ford	James Hylton Motorsports	49	Rick Clifton	1
Ford	James Hylton Motorsports	49	Richard Hauck	1
Ford	Brad Hill Racing	71	Shane Cockrum	1
Ford	Brian Keselowski Motorsports	29	Brian Keselowski	3
Ford	Catania Racing with Roo Motorsports	18	Bill Catania	1
Ford	Cunningham Motorsports	99	Austin Cindric	2
Ford	Empire Racing	8	Austin Hill	1
Ford	Empire Racing	82	Patrick Staropoli	1
Ford	Fast Track Racing	11	Ed Pompa	1
Ford	Fast Track Racing	11	Dick Doheny	1
Ford	Kimmel Racing	67	Mark Meunier (R)	1
Ford	Kimmel Racing	67	Chris Bailey Jr.	1
Ford	Kimmel Racing	80	Chris Bailey Jr.	1
Ford	Kimmel Racing	80	Wayne Peterson	1
Ford	Lira Motorsports	36	Brandon Lynn	1
Ford	Lira Motorsports	36	Chris Windom	1
Ford	Lira Motorsports	36	Jairo Avila Jr.	1
Ford	Lira Motorsports	38	John Lowinski-Loh	1
Ford	Lira Motorsports	38	Blake Jones (R)	1
Ford	Lira Motorsports	38	Tyler Dippel	1
Ford	Lira Motorsports	38	Ryan Reed	2
Ford	Mullins Racing	1	J. J. Pack	1
Ford	Goodson Racing	1	Bubba Pollard	2
Ford	Mystic Motorsports	07	Brian Kaltreider	2
Ford	RFMS Racing	27	A. J. Fike	9
Ford	Roo Motorsports	94	Dalton Hopkins	1
Ford	Roulo Brothers Racing	17	Buster Graham	2
Ford	Steve Minghenelli Racing	24	Steve Minghenelli	1
Ford	Team BCR Racing	45	Brennan Poole	1
Ford	Team BCR Racing	88	Cole Powell	1
Toyota	Ken Schrader Racing	11	Mark Thompson	1
Toyota	Ken Schrader Racing	66	Mark Thompson	1
Toyota	Rette Jones Racing	30	Terry Jones	2
Toyota	Venturini Motorsports	66	Leilani Münter	1
Chevrolet 8 Ford 2	Bobby Gerhart Racing	5	Bobby Gerhart	8
Chevrolet 8 Ford 2	Bobby Gerhart Racing	5	Clair Zimmerman	2
Dodge 1 Chevrolet 2	Crosley Sports Group	56	Ricky Howerton	1
Dodge 1 Chevrolet 2	Crosley Sports Group	56	B.J. Deal	1
Dodge 1 Chevrolet 2	Crosley Sports Group	56	Nick Higdon	1
Dodge 1 Toyota 2	Tyler Audie Racing	12	Tyler Audie	3
Ford 5 Chevrolet 1	Dale Shearer Racing 5 Wayne Peterson Racing 1	73	Dale Shearer	5
Ford 5 Chevrolet 1	Dale Shearer Racing 5 Wayne Peterson Racing 1	73	Mike Abram	1
Ford 3 Chevrolet 4	Mason Mitchell Motorsports	78	Mason Mitchell	6
Ford 3 Chevrolet 4	Mason Mitchell Motorsports	78	Kody Evans	1
Ford 3 Chevrolet 4	Mason Mitchell Motorsports	78	Noah Gragson	1

=== Changes ===
- Thomas Praytor ran a full season for his new family team, Max Force Racing, having been a driver with Hixson Motorsports for the prior two years.
- Canadian female driver Sarah Cornett-Ching ran for rookie of the year in the No. 2, replacing Praytor. She drove for a new team, RACE 101, which was fielded in a partnership with Hixson.
- Driver Terry Jones and crew chief Mark Rette formed a new team, Rette Jones Racing, that ran on a partial basis.
- Josh Reeves was scheduled to run a full season for Carter 2 Motorsports as a development driver, but this did not occur.
- Brennan Poole was scheduled to drive a minimum of 10 races for Team BCR Racing, but those plans were called off once he was announced to run a partial Xfinity Series schedule for HScott Motorsports with Chip Ganassi. His only ARCA attempt in 2015 (and for Team BCR) was a withdrawal at Daytona.
- Frank Kimmel cut back his schedule after 18 full seasons in ARCA. Additionally, Kimmel moved from Win-Tron Racing to the Venturini Motorsports No. 25 car, sharing the ride with Brandon Jones.
- Bo LeMastus ran full-time and for rookie of the year with his own team, the No. 42 Dodge/Toyota for Crosley Sports Group.
- It was announced that Clay Campbell, Matt Tifft, and Ross Kenseth would share Ken Schrader Racing's No. 52 car for the full season, along with Schrader himself. Hunter Baize would later join those four drivers in the car as well, making two starts.
- It was announced that Will Kimmel would drive his family team's No. 69 Ford full-time again in 2015, although he did end up being replaced in two races by Matt Wallace and in one by James Swanson this season.
- After driving at Daytona in the No. 68 for Kimmel Racing, it was announced that David Levine would run for rookie of the year and drive the No. 59 for Lira Motorsports for the remainder of the season.
- Bobby Hamilton Jr. was set to run the full season for Carter 2 Motorsports in the No. 97 Dodge, but he left the team after ten races.
- Venturini Motorsports' No. 55 Toyota was shared between drivers including Cody Coughlin, Dominic Ursetta, and Todd Gilliland, who won in his series debut at Toledo just days after turning 15 and being eligible to race in ARCA.

== Schedule ==
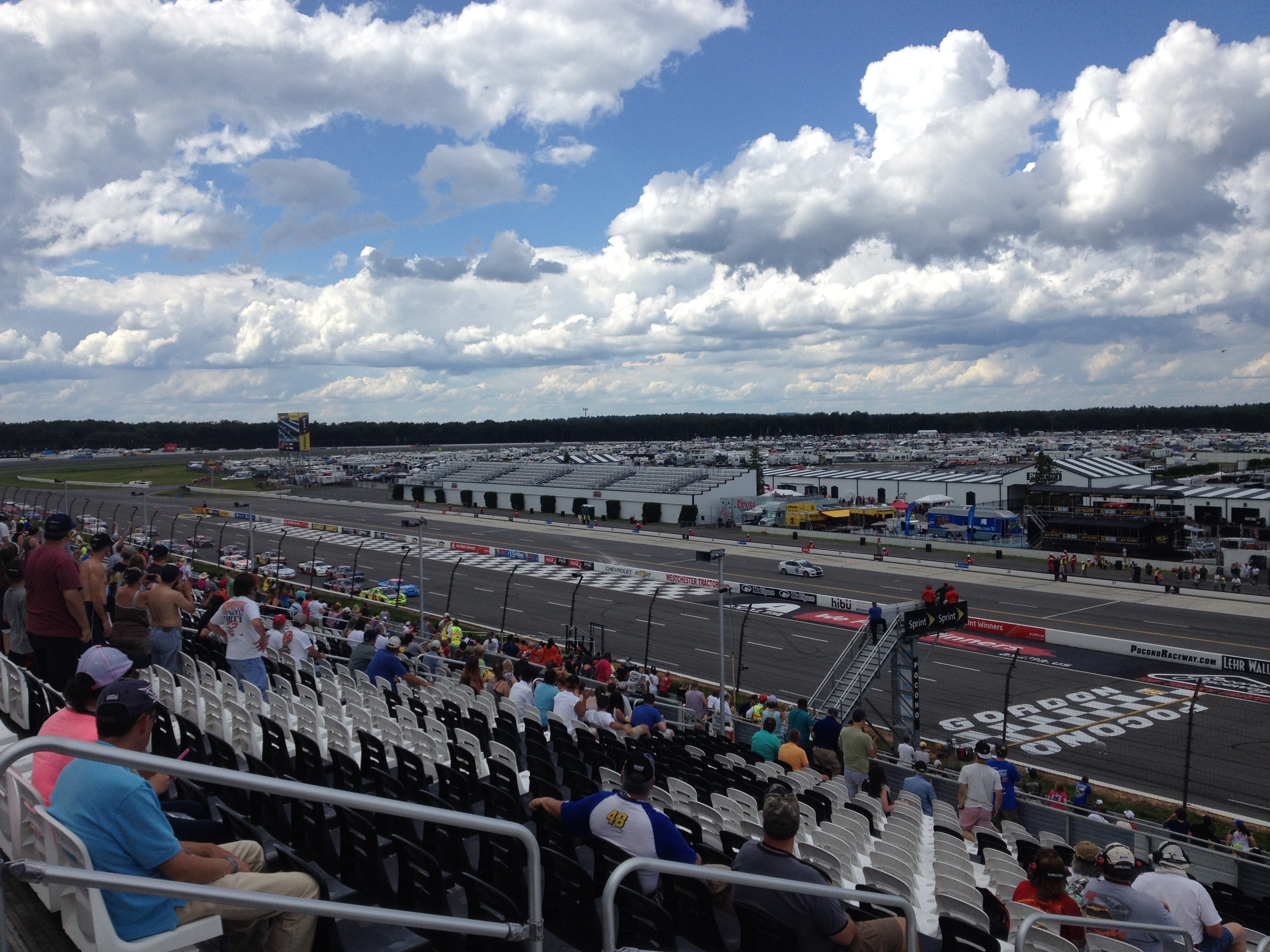
The ModSpace 125 at Pocono Raceway in August

The 2015 schedule was fully released on November 26, 2014.

No.	Race title	Track	Date	TV
1	Lucas Oil 200 presented by Autozone	Daytona International Speedway, Daytona Beach	February 14	FS1
2	ARCA Mobile 200	Mobile International Speedway, Irvington	March 14	
3	Troop Aid 200	Fairgrounds Speedway, Nashville	April 11	MAVTV; PPV
4	Federated Auto Parts 200	Salem Speedway, Salem	April 26	
5	International Motorsports Hall of Fame 200	Talladega Superspeedway, Lincoln	May 1	FS1
6	Menards 200 presented by Federated Car Care	Toledo Speedway, Toledo, Ohio	May 17	CBSSN
7	ARCA 150 presented by Unique Pretzels	New Jersey Motorsports Park, Millville	May 24	
8	Pocono ARCA 200	Pocono Raceway, Long Pond	June 6	FS2
9	Corrigan Oil Co. 250	Michigan International Speedway, Brooklyn	June 12	FS2
10	Scott 150	Chicagoland Speedway, Joliet	June 20	FS2
11	Herr's Chase The Taste 200	Winchester Speedway, Winchester, Indiana	June 28	CBSSN
12	#ThisIsMySpeedway150	Iowa Speedway, Newton	July 17	FS1
13	Sioux Chief PowerPEX 200	Lucas Oil Raceway, Brownsburg	July 24	FS1
14	ModSpace 125	Pocono Raceway, Long Pond	August 1	FS2
15	Federated Auto Parts 200	Berlin Raceway, Marne	August 8	
16	SuperChevyStores.com-Allen Crowe 100	Illinois State Fairgrounds Racetrack, Springfield	August 23	CBSSN
17	Southern Illinois 100 presented by Federated Car Care	DuQuoin State Fairgrounds Racetrack, Du Quoin	September 7	
18	Federated Car Care ARCA Fall Classic 200	Salem Speedway, Salem	September 19	PPV
19	Crosley Brands 150	Kentucky Speedway, Sparta	September 26†	FS2
20	Full Throttle S'loonshine 98.9	Kansas Speedway, Kansas City	October 16	FS1
†: The Crosley Brands 150 was postponed a day because of persistent rain.

== Results and standings ==
=== Races ===
No.	Race	Pole position	Most laps led	Winning driver	Manufacturer	No.	Winning team
1	Lucas Oil 200 presented by Autozone	Mark Thompson	Grant Enfinger	Grant Enfinger	Chevrolet	23	GMS Racing
2	ARCA Mobile 200	Austin Wayne Self	Grant Enfinger	Grant Enfinger	Chevrolet	23	GMS Racing
3	Troop Aid 200	Kyle Weatherman	Grant Enfinger	Grant Enfinger	Chevrolet	23	GMS Racing
4	Federated Auto Parts 200	Austin Wayne Self	Ken Schrader	Ken Schrader	Chevrolet	52	Ken Schrader Racing
5	International Motorsports Hall of Fame 200	Cody Coughlin	Tom Hessert III	Blake Jones	Dodge	22	Cunningham Motorsports
6	Menards 200 presented by Federated Car Care	Grant Enfinger	Grant Enfinger	Todd Gilliland	Toyota	55	Venturini Motorsports
7	ARCA 150 presented by Unique Pretzels	Cole Custer	Matt Tifft	Kyle Weatherman	Dodge	22	Cunningham Motorsports
8	Pocono ARCA 200	Trevor Bayne	Trevor Bayne	Trevor Bayne	Ford	22	Cunningham Motorsports
9	Corrigan Oil Co. 200	Frank Kimmel	Ross Kenseth	Ross Kenseth	Chevrolet	52	Ken Schrader Racing
10	Scott 150	Cody Coughlin	Ryan Reed	Ryan Reed	Ford	58	Lira Motorsports
11	Herr's Chase The Taste 200	Kyle Weatherman	Brandon Jones	Austin Wayne Self	Ford	98	Mason Mitchell Motorsports
12	#ThisIsMySpeedway150	Kyle Weatherman	Matt Kurzejewski	Mason Mitchell	Chevrolet	78	Mason Mitchell Motorsports
13	Sioux Chief PowerPEX 200 presented by Federated Car Care	Kyle Weatherman	William Byron	Travis Braden	Chevrolet	01	Braden Racing
14	ModSpace 125	Frank Kimmel	Matt Kurzejewski	Cole Custer	Chevrolet	00	JR Motorsports
15	Federated Auto Parts 200	Grant Enfinger	Grant Enfinger	Grant Enfinger	Chevrolet	23	GMS Racing
16	SuperChevyStores.com-Allen Crowe 100	Grant Enfinger	A. J. Fike	A. J. Fike	Ford	27	RFMS Racing
17	Southern Illinois 100 presented by Federated Car Care	Grant Enfinger	Kyle Weatherman	Grant Enfinger	Chevrolet	23	GMS Racing
18	Federated Car Care ARCA Fall Classic 200	Ken Schrader	Kyle Weatherman	Grant Enfinger	Chevrolet	23	GMS Racing
19	Crosley Brands 150	William Byron	Daniel Suárez	Ryan Reed	Ford	38	Lira Motorsports
20	Full Throttle S'loonshine 98.9	Daniel Suárez	Mason Mitchell	Mason Mitchell	Chevrolet	78	Mason Mitchell Motorsports

=== Drivers' championship ===
(key) Bold – Pole position awarded by time. Italics – Pole position set by final practice results or rainout. * – Most laps led.

Pos	Driver	DAY	MOB	FAI	SAL	TAL	TOL	NJE	POC	MIC	CHI	WIN	IOW	LOR	POC	BER	ISF	DUQ	SAL	KEN	KAN	Points
1	Grant Enfinger	1*	1*	1*	13	28	**19***	4	2	8	2	2	8	8	2	**1***	20	**1**	1	5	3	5085
2	Austin Wayne Self	15	4	3	5	32	6	7	15	3	12	1	6	9	7	5	10	15	16	11	12	4660
3	Josh Williams	9	3	7	19	18	3	3	7	6	7	7	22	6	5	6	4	4	8	24	26	4650
4	Tom Hessert III	11	11	19	7	15*	2	2	6	4	10	6	3	3	25	14	5	3	17	31	7	4630
5	David Levine	16	12	6	9	11	9	18	8	7	9	16	10	22	6	13	7	12	15	3	8	4515
6	Bo LeMastus	23	20	14	21	9	15	12	13	10	17	17	13	17	8	22	11	17	9	10	18	4120
7	Sarah Cornett-Ching	31	14	11	12	8	23	9	20	9	8	9	14	18	13	15	18	11	14	33	13	4085
8	Thomas Praytor	24	7	10	15	20	16	15	16	17	21	15	18	19	28	18	16	13	18	16	14	3930
9	James Swanson	40	16	16	10	25	22	27	25	11	14	8	17	26	14	12	9	18	31	15	16	3745
10	Kyle Weatherman		5	**5**	2		5	1				4	**2**	**7**	31	7	2	2*	11*	7	2	3565
11	Will Kimmel	10	23	25	20	29			4	16	3	20	26		17	11	23	14	3	22	21	3000
12	Josh White			28	23	34	28	28	33	23	25	DNS	28	30	27	25	21	27	29	23	32	2365
13	Frank Kimmel	5				14	11		11	2	5				**15**	3	13	7	23			2010
14	Bobby Hamilton Jr.	26	13	12	18	22	8	13	19	19	15											1975
15	Brandon Jones		2	4	6	4		10				3*	11	5						12	22	1925
16	Ed Pompa	30				17		17	14		18				19	19	25	23	21	28	19	1760
17	Matt Kurzejewski	7				6			5	5	6		15*		3*					9	9	1755
18	A. J. Fike			23			4					10	12	12		10	1*	6	7			1645
19	Con Nicolopoulos				22		26			22	24	19	24	29		23	24	25	27	30	24	1645
20	Matt Tifft		6	2				14*	10		4		5		23		28				15	1550
21	Wayne Peterson		25	29	26					27	27	21	29			24	29	29	28	26	27	1505
22	Mason Mitchell	6	19						3				1			2					1*	1260
23	Michael Lira		8	9	11		17	19	26			24	25	31								1220
24	Ken Schrader				1*		13					13		11				5	**2**			1180
25	Bobby Gerhart	39				26	DNS		9		11		16	14	9					25		1125
26	Mike Abram						DNS	29				25	31	34	DNS	27	31	21	30		33	1065
27	Blake Jones	17				1				15			7			8			19			1055
28	Cody Coughlin	4				**2**		6	12	14	**26**											985
29	Mark Meunier				25						28	23	27	32		26	30	30	32	18		945
30	Rick Clifton			22			14	26	30	13			19							19		895
31	Brad Smith	22	15	20	17	31																875
32	Richard Hauck						24				DNS	14		24		20			26		28	725
33	Ryan Reed										1*									1	4	690
34	Daniel Suárez	2									22									6*	**20**	690
35	Tom Berte								21		13		23		10					DNS	30	690
36	Travis Braden													1						2	6	655
37	Dale Shearer	DNQ												21			19	19	22		23	655
38	Brian Finney		10	13			7							28								630
39	Tyler Audie	18				10			18		16											610
40	Brian Keselowski													13		4			6			575
41	Cole Custer							**5**	24						1							560
42	Justin Haley				4									4					24			530
43	Tyler Dippel																12	16	4			530
44	Clayton Weatherman				8							11		15								520
45	David Sear									21			21		21					20		505
46	Eric Caudell					33			27			18							25	29		490
47	Chris Bailey Jr.			27		19	30			26					30							490
48	Cole Powell	20				3				18												485
49	Brandon Lynn																		13	13	17	475
50	Kevin Rutherford			21			12					12										465
51	Ross Kenseth									1*										4		450
52	Dale Matchett						29	21	22						26							430
53	Todd Gilliland						1						9									420
54	Darrell Basham				14														20	21		415
55	Tim Viens			26		35			31						29					27		410
56	Russ Dugger	DNQ				5															11	405
57	Dominic Ursetta		9		3																	400
58	Kelly Kovski																3	10				395
59	Justin Boston											5						8				395
60	Kevin Campbell			24									30	33			32	32	DNS			395
61	Scott Sheldon	8				7																390
62	Mike Basham																15	20			25	390
63	Chase Briscoe													10					5			385
64	Hunter Baize															9	6					385
65	Richard Altman			17						25			20									380
66	Ryan Unzicker																8	9				375
67	Austin Cindric												4							17		365
68	Justin Lloyd														DNS	17	26	28				360
69	Scott Edwards					24		16	29													345
70	Don Thompson							22	23						24							345
71	Matt Wallace						10							16								330
72	Jairo Avila Jr.														16						10	330
73	Mark Thompson	**14**				13																330
74	Steve Fox								17						12							315
75	Dick Doheny		22				25														29	310
76	William Byron													2*						**32**		305
77	Frankie Kimmel				24														10			295
78	Clair Zimmerman			18												16						290
79	Ryan Heavner			15							20											285
80	Terry Jones	19				16																285
81	Andy Seuss	DNQ				21					19											285
82	Brandon McKenzie				16		21															275
83	Mark Littleton																14	24				270
84	Alex Clubb											26					17	26				270
85	Trevor Bayne								**1***													245
86	Jordan Williams			DNS			20							23								245
87	Buster Graham	37				12																215
88	Austin Theriault														4							210
89	John Wes Townley																				5	210
90	Ray Ciccarelli								32						20							200
91	Clay Greenfield			8																		190
92	Steve Minghenelli							8														190
93	Chris Windom																			8		190
94	J. J. Pack	36													18							190
95	Kevin Hinckle									24	30											190
96	Barry Fitzgerald	28				27																185
97	Brian Kaltreider								34						22							180
98	John Lowinski-Loh	33									23											180
99	Bob Schacht							11														175
100	Nick Igdalsky														11							175
101	Daniel Hemric	12																				170
102	Mike Buckley									12												170
103	Kody Evans																		12			170
104	Austin Hill	13																				165
105	Noah Gragson																			14		160
106	Ronnie Osmer		17																			145
107	Bubba Pollard			DNS			18															140
108	Cory Howard		18																			140
109	Clay Campbell	35				30																135
110	Brian Wong							20														130
111	Tommy O'Leary IV									20												130
112	Scott Reeves													20								130
113	Patrick Staropoli	21																				125
114	Greg Hutto Jr.		21																			125
115	Matt Vainner															21						125
116	Ricky Howerton											22										120
117	Brad Dubil																22					120
118	Shane Cockrum																	22				120
119	George Cushman					23																115
120	Shawn Umphries							23														115
121	Allen Milton		24																			110
122	Emerson Newton-John							24														110
123	Karl Weber	25																				105
124	Robert Mitten							25														105
125	Tyler Miles													25								105
126	Nick Higdon																	DNS			31	100
127	Bill Catania	27																				95
128	Shawn Szep						27															95
129	Chris Lafferty													27								95
130	B. J. Deal																27					95
131	Kyle Benjamin								28													90
132	Sean Corr	29																				85
133	Mike Harmon										29											85
134	Billy Alger																	31				75
135	Roger Carter	32																				70
136	Garrett Smithley	34																				60
137	Leilani Munter	38																				40
138	Brett Hudson	3																				25
139	Scott Heckert																			DNS		25
140	Tommy Barrett Jr.	DNQ																				25
141	Brent Cross	DNQ																				25
142	Bryan Dauzat	DNQ																				25
143	Cassie Gannis	DNQ																				25
144	Raymond Hassler	DNQ																				25
145	Derrick Lancaster	DNQ																				25
	Donnie Neuenberger	QL																				0
Pos	Driver	DAY	MOB	FAI	SAL	TAL	TOL	NJE	POC	MIC	CHI	WIN	IOW	LOR	POC	BER	ISF	DUQ	SAL	KEN	KAN	Points

== See also ==
- 2015 NASCAR Sprint Cup Series
- 2015 NASCAR Xfinity Series
- 2015 NASCAR Camping World Truck Series
- 2015 NASCAR K&N Pro Series East
- 2015 NASCAR K&N Pro Series West
- 2015 NASCAR Whelen Modified Tour
- 2015 NASCAR Whelen Southern Modified Tour
- 2015 NASCAR Canadian Tire Series
- 2015 NASCAR Mexico Series
- 2015 NASCAR Whelen Euro Series
