= Derrick Lancaster =

American racing driver (born 1973)

- Nationality: (United States) American
- Born: Derrick Lancaster; January 26, 1973 (age 53) Christiansburg, Virginia, U.S.

ARCA Menards Series career
- Debut season: 2014
- Current team: Derrick Lancaster Racing
- Car number: 29
- Engine: Toyota
- Crew chief: Don Akers
- Starts: 7
- Championships: 0
- Wins: 0
- Poles: 0
- Best finish: 54th in 2014
- Finished last season: 61st

Previous series
- 2008-2020 2018: NASCAR Advance Auto Parts Weekly Series; CARS Super Late Model Tour
- Statistics up to date as of November 23, 2021.

Derrick Lancaster (born January 26, 1973) is an American professional stock car racing driver. He has most recently competed in the IHRA Stock Car Series, driving the No. 25 Chevrolet for his own team, Derrick Lancaster Racing. He has previously competed in the ARCA Menards Series.

== Racing career ==
From 2008 to 2020, Lancaster competed in several late model races, including the NASCAR Advance Auto Parts Weekly Series, the CARS Super Late Model Tour, the Dirty Dozen, and the Virginia Late Model Triple Crown Series. He mostly drove in the Weekly Series, getting 28 top-fives, 78 top-tens, and one win in a stake of 128 starts in eleven years.

=== ARCA Menards Series ===
Lancaster made his ARCA Racing Series (now ARCA Menards Series) start in 2014, driving the No. 56 Dodge Charger for Danny Glad Racing. He drove for them at Daytona International Speedway and Talladega Superspeedway, finishing thirteenth and sixth respectively.

Lancaster returned to Daytona in 2015, this time for his own team, Lancaster Racing. He failed to qualify for the race, and withdrew from Talladega.

Lancaster went back to Daytona for 2016, finishing 31st due to an early race wreck, and in 2017, where he finished in sixteenth after starting thirteenth.

Lancaster took a break from ARCA in 2018 to focus on late model races. He made his ARCA return a year later, driving for On Point Motorsports' No. 29 Toyota Camry.

=== Kingsport Speedway crash ===
On August 7, 2020, Lancaster suffered a serious crash at Kingsport Speedway in Kingsport, Tennessee, where his car got clipped with another car, which sent him head on into the turn 4 wall. The car burst into flames as it slid down the racetrack, with safety and rescue crews arriving on the scene.

The safety and rescue crews extracted Lancaster from the car, and he was taken to the Houston Valley Medical Center for an MRI scan, and for further evaluations.

The MRI scan results confirmed that Lancaster suffered a hairline fracture, also sometimes called a hangman's fracture. His wife, Elizabeth, said that Derrick would be put in a Cervical collar for three months, which would put his racing career on hold. She stated that "The worst words Derrick heard today was that he should never race again. Those words nearly killed him. But he knows he is very lucky to be alive.”

Lancaster was released from the hospital a month later, where he later had follow-up scans.

=== ARCA return ===
On November 11, 2020, Lancaster announced that he would be allowed to race again after being on a Cervical collar for three months. He stated “The days following my diagnosis were difficult for me; being told that I should never race again was hard on me considering that’s all I have done since I was 13 years old. Without knowing what the next days, weeks, and months would bring I continued to follow the doctors’ orders and if you know me that was a hard thing for me to do. On November 11, 2020 to my surprise, I was released by my doctor to race again."

He would return next season and race in the 2021 Lucas Oil 200. He started fourteenth and would finish sixth, his best career ARCA Menards Series finish.

=== Talladega crash ===
On April 24, 2021, Lancaster was running in 5th at Talladega Superspeedway when he and Drew Dollar made contact on the backstretch, causing Lancaster to hit the outside wall, resulting in the car bursting into flames right after impact. He spun his car into the infield grass shortly after the wreck.

Lancaster lay on the ground after he was able to get out of the car, until the NASCAR safety crew arrived to help him walk to the ambulance.

He was taken to the University of Alabama Birmingham Burn Center for further evaluations. His wife confirmed that Lancaster would be put on a ventilator for 48 to 72 hours while doctors tried to assess the lung damage. She also confirmed that Lancaster suffered first, second, and third-degree burns on his arms, neck, and face, and would later suffer pneumonia. On April 25, Elizabeth confirmed that Lancaster was in critical, but stable condition, as doctors found no burns in his lungs or trachea, and on April 27, Lancaster was taken off of the ventilator.

He was released from the medical facility on May 4.

Although Lancaster still competes locally, he hasn’t entered a single ARCA race since then.

=== Support ===
On May 1, the drivers competing in the 2021 Dutch Boy 150 at Kansas Speedway had No. 29 decals on the sides of their cars in support of Lancaster, as he was still hospitalized from the incident.

== Personal life ==
Lancaster currently resides in his hometown in Christiansburg, Virginia, with his wife and three daughters. He is the founder of Total Car & Truck Service, which is located at his race shop in Christiansburg. He graduated from Christiansburg High School in 1991.

== Motorsports career results ==
=== ARCA Menards Series ===
(key) (Bold – Pole position awarded by qualifying time. Italics – Pole position earned by points standings or practice time. * – Most laps led.)

ARCA Racing Series results
Year	Team	No.	Make	1	2	3	4	5	6	7	8	9	10	11	12	13	14	15	16	17	18	19	20	AMSC	Pts	Ref
2014	Danny Glad Racing	56	Dodge	DAY; 13	MOB	SLM	TAL; 6	TOL	NJM	POC	MCH	ELK	WIN	CHI	IRP	POC	BLN	ISF	MAD	DSF	SLM	KEN	KAN	54th	340	
2015	Lancaster Racing	83	Chevy	DAY; DNQ	MOB	NSH	SLM	TAL	TOL	NJE	POC	MCH	CHI	WIN	IOW	IRP	POC	BLN	ISF	DSF	SLM	KEN	KAN	145th	25	
2016	Derrick Lancaster Racing	83	Chevy	DAY; 31	NSH	SLM	TAL	TOL	NJE	POC	MCH	MAD	WIN	IOW	IRP	POC	BLN	ISF	DSF	SLM	CHI	KEN	KAN	130th	75	
2017	Derrick Lancaster Racing	83	Dodge	DAY; 16	NSH	SLM	TAL	TOL	ELK	POC	MCH	MAD	IOW	IRP	POC	WIN	ISF	ROA	DSF	SLM	CHI	KEN	KAN	97th	150	
2019	On Point Motorsports	29	Toyota	DAY; 17	FIF	SLM	TAL	NSH	TOL	CLT	POC	MCH	MAD	GTW	CHI	ELK	IOW	POC	ISF	DSF	SLM	IRP	KAN	73rd	145	
2021	Derrick Lancaster Racing	29	Toyota	DAY; 6	PHO	TAL; 23	KAN	TOL	CLT	MOH	POC	ELK	BLN	IOW	WIN	GLN	MCH	ISF	MLW	DSF	BRI	SLM	KAN	61st	61	

=== CARS Late Model Stock Car Tour ===
(key) (Bold – Pole position awarded by qualifying time. Italics – Pole position earned by points standings or practice time. * – Most laps led. ** – All laps led.)

CARS Late Model Stock Car Tour results
Year	Team	No.	Make	1	2	3	4	5	6	7	8	9	10	11	12	CLMSCTC	Pts	Ref
2018	Derrick Lancaster	25	N/A	TCM	MYB	ROU	HCY	BRI	ACE	CCS	KPT; 6	HCY	WKS	OCS	SBO	41st	27	

=== IHRA Late Model Sportsman Series ===
(key) (Bold – Pole position awarded by qualifying time. Italics – Pole position earned by points standings or practice time. * – Most laps led. ** – All laps led.)

IHRA Late Model Sportsman Series
Year	Team	No.	Make	1	2	3	ISCSS	Pts	Ref
2026	Derrick Lancaster Racing	25	Chevy	DUB; 5	CDL; 3	AND; 30	9th	103	
