= Dominic Ursetta =

American racing driver

- Born: April 17, 1988 (age 38); Arvada, Colorado, U.S.

ARCA Menards Series career
- 2 races run over 1 year
- Best finish: 57th (2015)
- First race: 2015 ARCA Mobile 200 (Mobile)
- Last race: 2015 Federated Auto Parts 200 (Salem)
Wins	Top tens	Poles
0	2	0
- Statistics up to date as of February 5, 2025.

Dominic Ursetta (born April 17, 1988) is an American professional stock car racing driver who has previously competed in the ARCA Racing Series.

Ursetta has previously competed in series such as the SRL Spears Southwest Tour Series, the High Plains Late Model Series, the Tri-State Tour, the Workin' Man Nationals, and the NASCAR Advance Auto Parts Weekly Series.

== Motorsports results ==
=== ARCA Racing Series ===
(key) (Bold – Pole position awarded by qualifying time. Italics – Pole position earned by points standings or practice time. * – Most laps led.)

ARCA Racing Series results
Year	Team	No.	Make	1	2	3	4	5	6	7	8	9	10	11	12	13	14	15	16	17	18	19	20	ARSC	Pts	Ref
2015	Venturini Motorsports	55	Toyota	DAY	MOB; 9	NSH	SLM; 3	TAL	TOL	NJE	POC	MCH	CHI	WIN	IOW	IRP	POC	BLN	ISF	DSF	SLM	KEN	KAN	57th	400	
