= John Lowinski-Loh =

American racing driver

- Born: March 15, 1991 (age 35); Milford, Massachusetts, U.S.

ARCA Menards Series career
- 3 races run over 2 years
- Best finish: 89th (2014)
- First race: 2014 ARCA 98.9 (Kansas)
- Last race: 2015 Scott 150 (Chicagoland)
Wins	Top tens	Poles
0	1	0
- Statistics up to date as of February 12, 2025.

John Lowinski-Loh Jr. (born March 15, 1991) is an American professional stock car racing driver who has previously competed in the ARCA Racing Series from 2014 to 2015.

Lowinski-Loh has also competed in the ACT Late Model Tour, the PASS National Championship Super Late Model Series, the PASS North Super Late Model Series, the Granite State Pro Stock Series, and the NASCAR Advance Auto Parts Weekly Series.

== Motorsports results ==
=== ARCA Racing Series ===
(key) (Bold – Pole position awarded by qualifying time. Italics – Pole position earned by points standings or practice time. * – Most laps led.)

ARCA Racing Series results
Year	Team	No.	Make	1	2	3	4	5	6	7	8	9	10	11	12	13	14	15	16	17	18	19	20	ARSC	Pts	Ref
2014	Team BCR Racing	09	Ford	DAY	MOB	SLM	TAL	TOL	NJE	POC	MCH	ELK	WIN	CHI	IRP	POC	BLN	ISF	MAD	DSF	SLM	KEN	KAN; 10	89th	180	
2015	Lira Motorsports	58	Ford	DAY; 33	MOB	NSH	SLM	TAL	TOL	NJE	POC	MCH												98th	180	
2015	Lira Motorsports	38	Ford										CHI; 23	WIN	IOW	IRP	POC	BLN	ISF	DSF	SLM	KEN	KAN	98th	180	
