= Sarah Cornett-Ching =

Canadian racecar driver

- Nationality: (Canada) Canadian
- Born: May 8, 1991 (age 35) Penticton, British Columbia, Canada

ARCA Menards Series career
- Debut season: 2015
- Former teams: RACE 101
- Starts: 28
- Wins: 0
- Poles: 0
- Best finish: 7th in 2015
- Finished last season: 22nd (2016)

Previous series
- 2015–2016 2011: ARCA Menards Series East; NASCAR Pinty's Series
- Statistics up to date as of January 6, 2020.

Sarah Cornett-Ching (born May 8, 1991) is a Canadian professional stock car racing driver. She most recently competed full-time in the ARCA Menards Series, driving the No. 2 Chevrolet/Toyota for the RACE 101 team in 2015 and 2016. Since then, she has been without a ride in any NASCAR series.

== Racing career ==
Cornett-Ching started her motorsports career at the age of twelve.

Cornett-Ching replaced Thomas Praytor full-time in the No. 2 Chevrolet for RACE 101Motorsports in 2015, after Praytor left the team to form his own team, Max Force Racing. Her entry was fielded throughout the season in a partnership between Tony Blanchard's team, RACE 101 and Hixson Motorsports. The entry was a RACE 101 car but they utilized Wayne Hixson's team owners points. Blanchard had previously partnered with Hixson the prior year on Hixson's other car, the No. 3, with rookie Karl Weber.

Cornett-Ching's seventh-place finish in the 2015 ARCA standings put her tied with Steve Arpin (who also finished seventh in 2009) as the second highest-finishing points finish by a Canadian driver in the history of the ARCA Series, behind Jerry Churchill's three top-ten points finishes of seventh, fifth, and third in the late 1980's. Cornett-Ching also set another record that year earning the highest-ever points standings finish by a female in the series. Natalie Decker would tie this record in 2018.

In addition to competing full-time in ARCA in 2015, Cornett-Ching also made her NASCAR K&N Pro Series East debut at Bristol, driving for Shayne Lockhart and Sam Hunt's DRIVE Technology team. RACE 101 also helped the team out for that race.

In September 2016, Cornett-Ching had a concussion while competing at Kentucky Speedway during the 2016 ARCA Racing Series. She resumed racing in March 2017 at a race in North Carolina.

== Personal life ==
Cornett-Ching was born in Penticton, British Columbia and as of 2011, was living in Kelowna. Some of her hobbies include longboarding, snowboarding, dirt biking, and camping.

== Motorsports career results ==
=== NASCAR ===
(key) (Bold – Pole position awarded by qualifying time. Italics – Pole position earned by points standings or practice time. * – Most laps led.)

==== K&N Pro Series East ====
NASCAR K&N Pro Series East results
Year	Team	No.	Make	1	2	3	4	5	6	7	8	9	10	11	12	13	14	NKNPSEC	Pts	Ref
2015	DRIVE Technology	18	Toyota	NSM	GRE	BRI; 20												37th	67	
2015	RACE 101	02	Chevy				IOW	BGS	LGY	COL; 21	NHA	IOW	GLN; 24	MOT	VIR	RCH	DOV	37th	67	
2016	RACE 101	02	Ford	NSM; 22	MOB; 11	GRE; 13		VIR; 16	DOM	STA	COL	NHA	IOW	GLN	GRE	NJM	DOV	25th	129	
2016	RACE 101	02	Toyota				BRI; 29											25th	129	

==== Canadian Tire Series ====
NASCAR Canadian Tire Series results
Year	Team	No.	Make	1	2	3	4	5	6	7	8	9	10	11	12	NCTSC	Pts	Ref
2011	Jason White	25	Chevy	MSP	ICAR	DEL	MSP	TOR	MPS; 14	SAS	CTR	CGV	BAR	RIS	KWA	54th	121	

^{*} Season still in progress
^{1} Ineligible for series points

=== ARCA Racing Series ===
(key) (Bold – Pole position awarded by qualifying time. Italics – Pole position earned by points standings or practice time. * – Most laps led.)

ARCA Racing Series results
Year	Team	No.	Make	1	2	3	4	5	6	7	8	9	10	11	12	13	14	15	16	17	18	19	20	ARSC	Pts	Ref
2015	RACE 101	2	Chevy	DAY; 31	MOB; 14	NSH; 11	SLM; 12	TAL; 8	TOL; 23	NJE; 9	POC; 20	MCH; 9	CHI; 8	WIN; 9	IOW; 14	IRP; 18	POC; 13	BLN; 15	ISF; 18	DSF; 11	SLM; 14	KEN; 33	KAN; 13	7th	4085	
2016	RACE 101	2	Chevy	DAY; 11	NSH	SLM	TAL	TOL	NJE									ISF; 18	DSF	SLM; 11				22nd	1260	
2016	RACE 101	2	Toyota							POC; QL^{†}	MCH; 11	MAD	WIN	IOW; 17	IRP	POC; 9	BLN				CHI; 11	KEN; 28	KAN	22nd	1260	
^{†} – Replaced by Ray Ciccarelli

=== CARS Late Model Stock Car Tour ===
(key) (Bold – Pole position awarded by qualifying time. Italics – Pole position earned by points standings or practice time. * – Most laps led. ** – All laps led.)

CARS Late Model Stock Car Tour results
Year	Team	No.	Make	1	2	3	4	5	6	7	8	9	10	11	12	CLMSCTC	Pts	Ref
2018	Robert Tyler	44	Ford	TCM	MYB	ROU	HCY	BRI	ACE	CCS	KPT	HCY	WKS; 10	ROU	SBO	46th	23	
2019	Jimmy Mooring	31C	Chevy	SNM	HCY	ROU	ACE	MMS	LGY	DOM	CCS	HCY; 20				39th	31	
2019	Jimmy Mooring	17C	Chevy										ROU; 15	SBO		39th	31	
