= James Swanson (racing driver) =

American racing driver

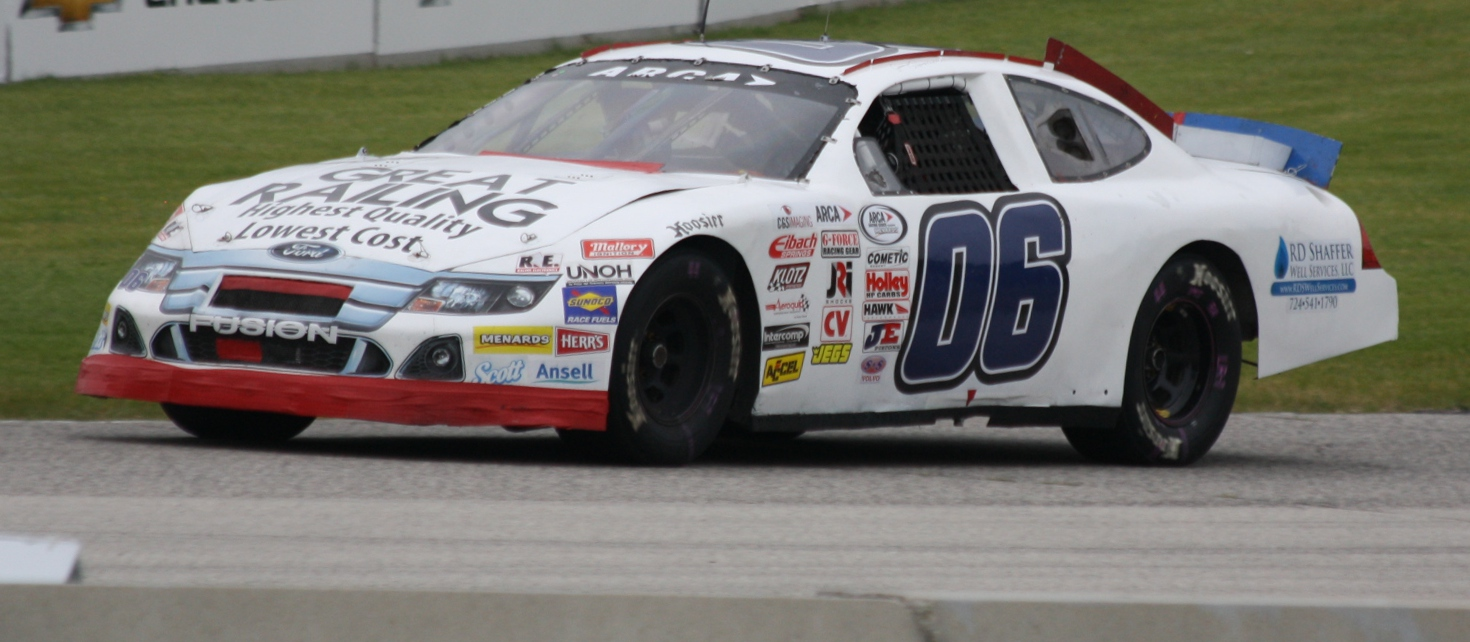
- Swanson's No. 06 ARCA car at Road America in 2013
- Born: April 26, 1980 (age 46); Clarksboro, New Jersey, U.S.

ARCA Menards Series career
- 64 races run over 5 years
- Best finish: 9th (2014), (2015)
- First race: 2012 Berlin ARCA 200 (Berlin)
- Last race: 2017 Crosley 150 (Kentucky)
Wins	Top tens	Poles
0	3	0

James Swanson (born April 26, 1980) is an American professional stock car racing driver who has previously competed in the ARCA Menards Series, with a majority of his starts being with Wayne Peterson Racing. He has also competed in the ASA National Tour.

== Racing career ==
In 2012, Swanson made his ARCA Racing Series in 2012, driving the No. 0 Ford for Wayne Peterson Racing at Berlin Raceway, finishing 26th due to a rear-end failure. He would make three more starts that year, with his best finish out of those starts being 18th at Madison International Speedway.

In 2013, Swanson ran all but one race (that being the season opener at Daytona International Speedway) for Wayne Peterson, primarily driving the team's No. 0 and No. 06 entries. He only finished four of those races and earned a best finish of sixteenth at Winchester Speedway, although he failed to finish that race due to a multi-car crash late in the event. He finished thirteenth in the final standings.

Swanson remained with Peterson for the 2014 season, driving in all but three races on the schedule. He occupied the same rides as he did last year, and earned a best finish of twelfth at Madison and Salem Speedway, and finished ninth in the final points standings. In the final race of the year at Kansas Speedway, Swanson was involved in a multi-car accident on lap 72, where he drove into the side of the car of Austin Wayne Self at near full speed whilst trying to slow down. Both drivers were able to escape without serious injury.

In 2015, Swanson ran the full schedule, starting the season with Wayne Peterson Racing for the first five races before moving to James Hylton Motorsports as a replacement for Brad Smith, who was injured in a crash at Talladega Superspeedway, for all but New Jersey Motorsports Park, where he drove for Kimmel Racing. Through his time with Hylton, Swanson achieved three top-tens with a best finish of eighth at Winchester Speedway, and finished ninth in points again. Swanson and Hylton had originally planned to run again in 2016, driving in the fall race at Salem Speedway and potentially more races pending sponsorship, although nothing would materialize, and Swanson would not run any ARCA races in 2016. He then returned to the series in 2017, driving in three events, with the first being at Berlin Raceway driving for Fast Track Racing in the No. 10 Dodge, and the other two at Chicagoland Speedway and Kentucky Speedway, driving for Wayne Peterson Racing.

After not racing from 2018 to 2022, Swanson entered the ASA National Tour race at Wisconsin International Raceway in 2023, driving the No. 7NJ entry, where he started and finished in 27th after running only eighteen laps due to mechanical issues.

== Motorsports results ==
=== ARCA Racing Series ===
(key) (Bold – Pole position awarded by qualifying time. Italics – Pole position earned by points standings or practice time. * – Most laps led.)

ARCA Racing Series results
Year	Team	No.	Make	1	2	3	4	5	6	7	8	9	10	11	12	13	14	15	16	17	18	19	20	21	ARSC	Pts	Ref
2012	Wayne Peterson Racing	0	Ford	DAY	MOB	SLM	TAL	TOL	ELK	POC	MCH	WIN	NJE	IOW	CHI	IRP	POC	BLN; 26							58th	370	
2012	Wayne Peterson Racing	00	Ford																ISF; 31						58th	370	
2012	Wayne Peterson Racing	06	Ford																	MAD; 18					58th	370	
2012	Wayne Peterson Racing	5	Ford																		SLM; 35	DSF	KAN		58th	370	
2013	Wayne Peterson Racing	06	Ford	DAY	MOB; 18				ELK; 17	POC; 25	MCH; 20	ROA; 20	WIN; 16	CHI; 20	NJE; 25	POC; 26	BLN; 22	ISF; 20							13th	3245	
2013	Wayne Peterson Racing	06	Chevy			SLM; 28	TAL; 21													DSF; 20	IOW; 27		KEN; 28	KAN; 30	13th	3245	
2013	Wayne Peterson Racing	0	Chevy					TOL; 30											MAD; 20			SLM; 30			13th	3245	
2014	Wayne Peterson Racing	0	Ford	DAY	MOB; 24			TOL; 27	NJE; 18	POC	MCH; 22	ELK; 18	WIN; 15												9th	2785	
2014	Wayne Peterson Racing	06	Chevy			SLM; 27	TAL																		9th	2785	
2014	Wayne Peterson Racing	0	Dodge											CHI; 19	IRP; 22	POC; 17	BLN; 16	ISF; 14							9th	2785	
2014	Wayne Peterson Racing	06	Dodge																MAD; 12	DSF; 18	SLM; 12	KEN; 22	KAN; 23		9th	2785	
2015	Wayne Peterson Racing	0	Chevy	DAY; 40																					9th	3745	
2015	Wayne Peterson Racing	06	Dodge		MOB; 16	NSH; 16	SLM; 10																		9th	3745	
2015	Wayne Peterson Racing	06	Chevy					TAL; 25																	9th	3745	
2015	James Hylton Motorsports	38	Dodge						TOL; 22																9th	3745	
2015	Kimmel Racing	69	Ford							NJE; 27															9th	3745	
2015	James Hylton Motorsports	48	Dodge								POC; 25		CHI; 14	WIN; 8	IOW; 17	IRP; 26		BLN; 12	ISF; 9	DSF; 18					9th	3745	
2015	James Hylton Motorsports	48	Ford									MCH; 11					POC; 14				SLM; 31	KEN; 15	KAN; 16		9th	3745	
2017	Fast Track Racing	10	Dodge	DAY	NSH	SLM	TAL	TOL	ELK; 16	POC	MCH	MAD	IOW	IRP	POC	WIN	ISF	ROA	DSF	SLM					62nd	330	
2017	Wayne Peterson Racing	0	Ford																		CHI; 28				62nd	330	
2017	Wayne Peterson Racing	90	Chevy																			KEN; 28	KAN		62nd	330	

=== ASA STARS National Tour ===
(key) (Bold – Pole position awarded by qualifying time. Italics – Pole position earned by points standings or practice time. * – Most laps led. ** – All laps led.)

ASA STARS National Tour results
Year	Team	No.	Make	1	2	3	4	5	6	7	8	9	10	ASNTC	Pts	Ref
2023	James Swanson	7JS	Chevy	FIF	MAD	NWS	HCY	MLW	AND	WIR; 27	TOL	WIN	NSV	99th	25	
