= Karl Weber (racing driver) =

American professional stock car driver

- Born: November 17, 1996 (age 29) Ambia, Indiana, U.S.
- Debut season: 2013
- Starts: 20
- Championships: 0
- Wins: 0
- Podiums: 0
- Poles: 0
- Best finish: 10th in 2014
- Statistics up to date as of October 27, 2022.

Karl W. Weber (born November 17, 1996) is an American former professional stock car racing driver and author.

== Early life ==
Weber was born in Ambia, Indiana on November 17, 1996, and grew up on his family's farm where he would work on the weekdays.

== Racing career ==
Weber first started racing in Sportsman class cars in New Castle, Indiana. He would then compete in numerous national karting series before racing in super late models.

Weber would make his ARCA Racing Series debut in 2013 at the age of sixteen. He would drive the No. 3 Chevrolet for RACE 101 in two races that season at Madison International Speedway, where he would finish eleventh, and at Iowa Speedway, where he would finish last due to a crash on the second lap of the race.

Weber would rejoin RACE 101 for the 2014 season, running 17 of the 20 races on the schedule. He would run a majority of his races in the team's No. 3 entry, earning two top-ten finishes at Toledo Speedway and Pocono Raceway, finishing tenth in both events. Although he was not eligible to compete on tracks over 1.5 miles (besides Pocono and Kentucky) due to him not being eighteen, he would also run the No. 50 entry for the team in select events as a start and park to help fund the No. 3 entry when that ride was occupied by another driver. Those events were at Michigan and Springfield (where the No. 3 was run by Ron Cox), and Chicagoland (where it was run by Jerry Tunney). He would also run for Hixson Motorsports in a collaboration with RACE 101 at DuQuoin.

Weber would make one more start in the ARCA series at the season-opener at Daytona International Speedway, driving for RACE 101 again in the No. 3 entry as a teammate to Sarah Cornett-Ching. He would ultimately struggle to keep up with the lead draft of the cars at the front and finished 25th, albeit on the lead lap.

== Writing career ==
After his fathers' death in a farming accident, and the subsequent suspending of all farming operations, Weber would later pursue a writing career, publishing a series of sci-fi novels titled The Annabelle Perkins Saga.

== Personal life ==
After retiring from racing after 2015, Weber would attend and graduate from Purdue University with a bachelor's degree in agribusiness in 2019.

== Motorsports results ==
=== ARCA Racing Series ===
(key) (Bold – Pole position awarded by qualifying time. Italics – Pole position earned by points standings or practice time. * – Most laps led.)

ARCA Racing Series results
| Year | Team | No. | Make | 1 | 2 | 3 | 4 | 5 | 6 | 7 | 8 | 9 | 10 | 11 | 12 | 13 | 14 | 15 | 16 | 17 | 18 | 19 | 20 | 21 | ARSC | Pts | Ref |
|---|---|---|---|---|---|---|---|---|---|---|---|---|---|---|---|---|---|---|---|---|---|---|---|---|---|---|---|
| 2013 | RACE 101 | 3 | Chevy | DAY | MOB | SLM | TAL | TOL | ELK | POC | MCH | ROA | WIN | CHI | NJM | POC | BLN | ISF | MAD; 11 | DSF | IOW; 32 | SLM | KEN | KAN | 90th | 245 | |
| 2014 | RACE 101 | 3 | Chevy | DAY | MOB; 19 | SLM; 14 | TAL | TOL; 10 | NJE; 13 | POC; 10 | | ELK; 17 | WIN; 11 | | IRP; 14 | POC; 12 | BLN; 11 | | MAD; 20 | | SLM; 18 | KEN; 28 | KAN | | 10th | 2735 | |
| 2014 | RACE 101 | 50 | Chevy | | | | | | | | MCH; 27 | | | CHI; 27 | | | | ISF; 29 | | | | | | | 10th | 2735 | |
| 2014 | Hixson Motorsports | 3 | Chevy | | | | | | | | | | | | | | | | | DSF; 28 | | | | | 10th | 2735 | |
| 2015 | RACE 101 | 3 | Chevy | DAY; 25 | MOB | NSH | SLM | TAL | TOL | NJE | POC | MCH | CHI | WIN | IOW | IRP | POC | BLN | ISF | DSF | SLM | KEN | KAN | | 123rd | 105 | |
