= Justin Lloyd =

American racing driver (born 1992)

- Born: April 7, 1992 (age 34); Barrington, Illinois, U.S.

ARCA Menards Series career
- 9 races run over 5 years
- Best finish: 42nd (2009)
- First race: 2009 Wolverine Power Systems 200 (Berlin)
- Last race: 2015 Southern Illinois 100 (DuQuoin)
| Wins | Top tens | Poles |
|---|---|---|
| 0 | 1 | 0 |
- Statistics up to date as of January 27, 2025.

Justin Lloyd is an American former professional stock car racing driver who has competed in the ARCA Racing Series from 2009 to 2016.

== Motorsports results ==
=== ARCA Racing Series ===
(key) (Bold – Pole position awarded by qualifying time. Italics – Pole position earned by points standings or practice time. * – Most laps led.)

ARCA Racing Series results
| Year | Team | No. | Make | 1 | 2 | 3 | 4 | 5 | 6 | 7 | 8 | 9 | 10 | 11 | 12 | 13 | 14 | 15 | 16 | 17 | 18 | 19 | 20 | 21 | ARSC | Pts | Ref |
|---|---|---|---|---|---|---|---|---|---|---|---|---|---|---|---|---|---|---|---|---|---|---|---|---|---|---|---|
| 2009 | Venturini Motorsports | 15 | Chevy | DAY | SLM | CAR | TAL | KEN | TOL | POC | MCH | MFD | IOW | KEN | BLN; 8 | POC | ISF | CHI | TOL; 22 | DSF | NJE | SLM | KAN | | 42nd | 695 | |
| 2009 | RAB Racing | 09 | Ford | | | | | | | | | | | | | | | | | | | | | CAR; 19 | 42nd | 695 | |
| 2012 | Carter 2 Motorsports | 40 | Dodge | DAY | MOB | SLM | TAL | TOL | ELK | POC | MCH | WIN | NJE | IOW | CHI | IRP | POC | BLN; 19 | ISF | MAD | SLM | DSF | KAN | | 113th | 135 | |
| 2013 | Carter 2 Motorsports | 40 | Dodge | DAY | MOB | SLM | TAL | TOL | ELK | POC | MCH | ROA | WIN | CHI | NJM | POC | BLN; 14 | ISF; 25 | MAD | DSF | IOW | SLM | KEN | KAN | 86th | 265 | |
| 2015 | Carter 2 Motorsports | 40 | Chevy | DAY | MOB | NSH | SLM | TAL | TOL | NJE | POC | MCH | CHI | WIN | IOW | IRP | POC; 33 | BLN; 17 | ISF; 26 | DSF; 28 | SLM | KEN | KAN | | 68th | 360 | |
| 2016 | Carter 2 Motorsports | 40 | Chevy | DAY; Wth | NSH | SLM | TAL | TOL | NJE | POC | MCH | MAD | WIN | IOW | IRP | POC | BLN | ISF | DSF | SLM | CHI | KEN | KAN | | N/A | 0 | |
