= Tyler Audie =

American racing driver

- Born: September 18, 1996 (age 30); Orlando, Florida, U.S.

ARCA Menards Series career
- 8 races run over 3 years
- Best finish: 39th (2015)
- First race: 2014 Herr's Live Life With Flavor 200 (Madison)
- Last race: 2016 General Tire 200 (Talladega)
Wins	Top tens	Poles
0	1	0
- Statistics up to date as of February 11, 2025.

Tyler Audie (born September 18, 1996) is an American former professional stock car racing driver who has previously competed in the ARCA Racing Series from 2014 to 2016.

Audie has also competed in series such as the PASS South Super Late Model Series, the ASA Southern Super Series, the PASS Pro Late Model Series, and the World Series of Asphalt Stock Car Racing.

== Motorsports results ==
=== ARCA Racing Series ===
(key) (Bold – Pole position awarded by qualifying time. Italics – Pole position earned by points standings or practice time. * – Most laps led.)

ARCA Racing Series results
Year	Team	No.	Make	1	2	3	4	5	6	7	8	9	10	11	12	13	14	15	16	17	18	19	20	ARSC	Pts	Ref
2014	Tyler Audie Racing	12	Chevy	DAY	MOB	SLM	TAL	TOL	NJE	POC	MCH	ELK	WIN	CHI	IRP	POC	BLN	ISF	MAD; 17	DSF	SLM	KEN; 19	KAN	60th	280	
2013	Tyler Audie Racing	12	Toyota	DAY; 18	MOB	NSH	SLM	TAL; 10	TOL	NJE														39th	610	
2013	Tyler Audie Racing	12	Dodge								POC; 18	MCH												39th	610	
2013	Tyler Audie Racing	6	Dodge										CHI; 16	WIN	IOW	IRP	POC	BLN	ISF	DSF	SLM	KEN	KAN	39th	610	
2016	Tyler Audie Racing	12	Toyota	DAY; 12	NSH	SLM	TAL; 30	TOL	NJE	POC	MCH	MAD	WIN	IOW	IRP	POC	BLN	ISF	DSF	SLM	CHI	KEN	KAN	83rd	250	
