= David Sear =

American racing driver

- Born: February 28, 1954 (age 72); La Jolla, California, U.S.

ARCA Menards Series career
- 14 races run over 6 years
- Best finish: 44th (2016)
- First race: 2013 Prairie Meadows 150 (Iowa)
- Last race: 2018 Fans With Benefits 150 (Iowa)
Wins	Top tens	Poles
0	0	0
- Statistics up to date as of February 4, 2025.

David Sear (born February 28, 1954) is an American professional stock car racing driver who has previously competed in the ARCA Racing Series from 2013 to 2018.

Sear has also competed in the World Series of Asphalt Stock Car Racing.

== Motorsports results ==
=== ARCA Racing Series ===
(key) (Bold – Pole position awarded by qualifying time. Italics – Pole position earned by points standings or practice time. * – Most laps led.)

ARCA Racing Series results
Year	Team	No.	Make	1	2	3	4	5	6	7	8	9	10	11	12	13	14	15	16	17	18	19	20	21	ARSC	Pts	Ref
2013	Carter 2 Motorsports	40	Dodge	DAY	MOB	SLM	TAL	TOL	ELK	POC	MCH	ROA	WIN	CHI	NJM	POC	BLN	ISF	MAD	DSF	IOW; 25	SLM	KEN	KAN	132nd	105	
2014	Carter 2 Motorsports	40	Dodge	DAY	MOB	SLM	TAL	TOL	NJE	POC	MCH; 20	ELK	WIN	CHI	IRP	POC	BLN	ISF	MAD	DSF	SLM				104th	155	
2014	Ebert Motorsports	19	Chevy																			KEN; 34	KAN		104th	155	
2015	Carter 2 Motorsports	40	Dodge	DAY	MOB	NSH	SLM	TAL	TOL	NJE	POC	MCH; 21	CHI	WIN											45th	505	
2015	Ebert Motorsports	19	Chevy												IOW; 21	IRP	POC; 21	BLN	ISF	DSF	SLM	KEN; 20	KAN		45th	505	
2016	Ebert Motorsports	19	Chevy	DAY	NSH	SLM	TAL	TOL	NJE	POC	MCH; 24	MAD	WIN	IOW; 20	IRP	POC; 19	BLN	ISF	DSF	SLM	CHI	KEN; 17	KAN		44th	520	
2017	Ebert Motorsports	19	Chevy	DAY	NSH	SLM	TAL	TOL	ELK	POC	MCH; 22	MAD	IOW	IRP	POC	WIN	ISF	ROA	DSF	SLM	CHI	KEN	KAN		106th	120	
2018	Kimmel Racing	69	Ford	DAY	NSH	SLM	TAL	TOL	CLT; 22	POC	MCH; 14	MAD	GTW	CHI	IOW; 19	ELK	POC	ISF	BLN	DSF	SLM	IRP	KAN		49th	415	
