= Brandon McKenzie =

American racing driver

- Born: June 30, 1981 (age 45); Asheboro, North Carolina, U.S.

ARCA Menards Series career
- 2 races run over 1 year
- Best finish: 82nd (2015)
- First race: 2015 Federated Auto Parts 200 (Salem)
- Last race: 2015 Menards 200 Presented by Federated Car Care (Toledo)
Wins	Top tens	Poles
0	0	0
- Statistics up to date as of November 5, 2024.

Brandon McKenzie (born June 30, 1981) is an American professional stock car racing driver who has competed in the ARCA Racing Series.

In 2015, McKenzie made his debut in the ARCA Racing Series at Salem Speedway, driving the No. 40 Dodge for Carter 2 Motorsports, where he started in seventeenth and finished eighteen laps down in sixteenth place. He then ran at Toledo Speedway for the team shortly thereafter, where he started in 22nd and finished in 21st due to a crash.

In 2024, McKenzie owned an ARCA car purchased from Kimmel Racing and assigned Roger Carter, whom he drove for in his ARCA starts, to pick up and complete the car. With or without McKenzie's permission, Carter subleased the car to Alex Malycke for the ARCA Menards Series East race at Flat Rock Speedway in Michigan. Malycke arrived at the track but Carter no-showed the race which prompted an investigation from the Loudoun County (VA) Sheriff's Office. On July 1, Carter reported the car and tools "as missing", but he had fled to Virginia a week later. Carter would later be arrested on July 29, and the car, as well as the engine and transmission, would not be found until September of that year, with the car ditched in a cornfield in Illinois, and the engine and transmission being found in a storage locker, and were returned to the McKenzie's shortly afterwards.

McKenzie is the father of fellow racing driver London McKenzie, who has previously competed in the ARCA Menards Series East.

McKenzie has also competed in series such as the PASS Pro Late Model Series, the Southeast Legends Tour, the INEX Nashville Spring Series, the INEX Summer Shootout Series at Charlotte Motor Speedway, and the INEX Winter Nationals.

== Motorsports results ==
=== ARCA Racing Series ===
(key) (Bold – Pole position awarded by qualifying time. Italics – Pole position earned by points standings or practice time. * – Most laps led.)

ARCA Racing Series results
Year	Team	No.	Make	1	2	3	4	5	6	7	8	9	10	11	12	13	14	15	16	17	18	19	20	ARSC	Pts	Ref
2015	Carter 2 Motorsports	40	Dodge	DAY	MOB	NSH	SLM; 16	TAL	TOL; 21	NJE	POC	MCH	CHI	WIN	IOW	IRP	POC	BLN	ISF	DSF	SLM	KEN	KAN	82nd	275	
