= Barry Fitzgerald (racing driver) =

American racing driver (born 1954)

- Born: April 11, 1954 (age 72); Sykesville, Maryland, U.S.

ARCA Menards Series career
- 28 races run over 6 years
- Best finish: 16th (2009)
- First race: 2009 Lucas Oil 200 (Daytona)
- Last race: 2015 International Motorsports Hall of Fame 200 (Talladega)
Wins	Top tens	Poles
0	0	0
- Statistics up to date as of June 30, 2023.

Barry Fitzgerald (born April 11, 1954) is an American former professional stock car racing driver who has previously competed in the ARCA Racing Series and the NASCAR Goody's Dash Series.

== Racing career ==
In 1995, Fitzgerald make his debut in the NASCAR Goody's Dash Series at Daytona International Speedway driving the No. 53 Chevrolet, where he would start 40th and finishing multiple laps down in 26th. After making a failed attempt to qualify for the Concord Speedway event two years later, he would officially make his second start in the series in 2000 at Lowe's Motor Speedway driving the No. 7 Pontiac, where he would start 34th and finish ten laps down in 33rd.

In 2009, Fitzgerald would make his ARCA Re/Max Series debut at Daytona driving the No. 06 Ford for Wayne Peterson Racing, where he would avoid numerous accidents to finish thirteenth in his first race in the series. He would fail to qualify for the next race at Salem Speedway and would remain with the team for the remainder of the schedule primarily in the No. 06 entry. He would go on to finish sixteenth in the final points standings. He would return to the team for Daytona the following year, where he would start 39th with a provisional, and would suffer an accident on lap 58 where his car turn sideways coming into the backstretch and would roll over six times before coming to rest on its wheels; he would classified in 29th. He would attempt two more races with the team that year, finishing 33rd at Texas Motor Speedway due to handling issues and failing to qualify for the first Pocono Raceway event. in the following year, he would once again run Daytona for Wayne Peterson, this time finishing 41st due to an oil leak. He would run the next race at Talladega Superspeedway driving the No. 14 Ford for Andy Belmont Racing, where he would finish 22nd. He would return with Belmont for Chicagoland Speedway, where he would finish 29th due to engine issues.

After not competing in the series in 2012, Fitzgerald would form his own team, Promotion Associates, and would enter in two races in 2013, withdrawing from Daytona in the No. 27 Ford, and finishing 18th at Talladega in the No. 94. He would return with his team for Daytona and Talladega the following year, this time in the No. 0, where he would finish 19th and 27th respectively. It was also during this year that he would reunite with Wayne Peterson Racing in the No. 06 at Berlin Raceway, where he would finish 21st due to handling issues. In 2015, Fitzgerald would once again race with his team at Daytona in the No. 00 Ford, where he would finish 28th, and would also run with Peterson at Talladega in the No. 0 Ford, where he would finish 27th. He has not raced in the series since then.

== Motorsports results ==
=== NASCAR ===
(key) (Bold – Pole position awarded by qualifying time. Italics – Pole position earned by points standings or practice time. * – Most laps led.)

==== Goody's Dash Series ====
NASCAR Goody's Dash Series results
Year	Team	No.	Make	1	2	3	4	5	6	7	8	9	10	11	12	13	14	15	16	17	18	19	20	21	NGDS	Pts	Ref
1995	N/A	53	Chevy	DAY; 26	FLO	LAN	MYB	SUM	HCY	CAR	STH	BRI	SUM	GRE	BGS	MYB	NSV	FLO	NWS	VOL	HCY	HOM			N/A	0	
1997	N/A	99	Pontiac	DAY	HOM	KIN	MYB	LAN	CAR	TRI	FLO	HCY	BRI	GRE	SNM	CLT	MYB	LAN	SUM	STA	HCY	USA	CON; DNQ	HOM	87th	73	
2000	N/A	7	Pontiac	DAY	MON	STA	JAC	CAR	CLT; 33	SBO	ROU	LOU	SUM	GRE	SNM	MYB	BRI	HCY	JAC	USA	LAN				81st	64	

=== ARCA Racing Series ===
(key) (Bold – Pole position awarded by qualifying time. Italics – Pole position earned by points standings or practice time. * – Most laps led.)

ARCA Racing Series results
Year	Team	No.	Make	1	2	3	4	5	6	7	8	9	10	11	12	13	14	15	16	17	18	19	20	21	ARSC	Pts	Ref
2009	Wayne Peterson Racing	06	Ford	DAY; 13	SLM; DNQ	CAR; 27	TAL; 31	KEN; 37	TOL; 34	POC; 31	MCH; 25	MFD; 27	IOW; 31	KEN; 25	BLN; 26	POC; 26	ISF; 27	CHI; 40	TOL; 26	DSF; 35	NJE; 24	SLM; 24			16th	2945	
2009	Wayne Peterson Racing	06	Chevy																				KAN; 32		16th	2945	
2009	Wayne Peterson Racing	0	Chevy																					CAR; DNQ	16th	2945	
2010	Wayne Peterson Racing	06	Ford	DAY; 29	PBE	SLM	TEX; 33	TAL	TOL	POC; DNQ	MCH	IOW	MFD	POC	BLN	NJE	ISF	CHI	DSF	TOL	SLM	KAN	CAR		91st	175	
2011	Wayne Peterson Racing	06	Chevy	DAY; 41																					81st	235	
2011	Andy Belmont Racing	14	Ford		TAL; 22	SLM	TOL	NJE	CHI; 29	POC	MCH	WIN	BLN	IOW	IRP	POC	ISF	MAD	DSF	SLM	KAN	TOL			81st	235	
2013	Promotion Associates	27	Ford	DAY; Wth	MOB	SLM																			120th	140	
2013	Promotion Associates	94	Ford				TAL; 18	TOL	ELK	POC	MCH	ROA	WIN	CHI	NJM	POC	BLN	ISF	MAD	DSF	IOW	SLM	KEN	KAN	120th	140	
2014	Promotion Associates	0	Ford	DAY; 19	MOB	SLM	TAL; 27	TOL	NJE	POC	MCH	ELK	WIN	CHI	IRP	POC									50th	355	
2014	Wayne Peterson Racing	06	Ford														BLN; 21	ISF	MAD	DSF	SLM	KEN	KAN		50th	355	
2015	Promotion Associates	00	Ford	DAY; 28	MOB	NSH	SLM																		96th	185	
2015	Wayne Peterson Racing	0	Ford					TAL; 27	TOL	NJE	POC	MCH	CHI	WIN	IOW	IRP	POC	BLN	ISF	DSF	SLM	KEN	KAN		96th	185	
