= A. J. Fike =

American racing driver (born 1980)

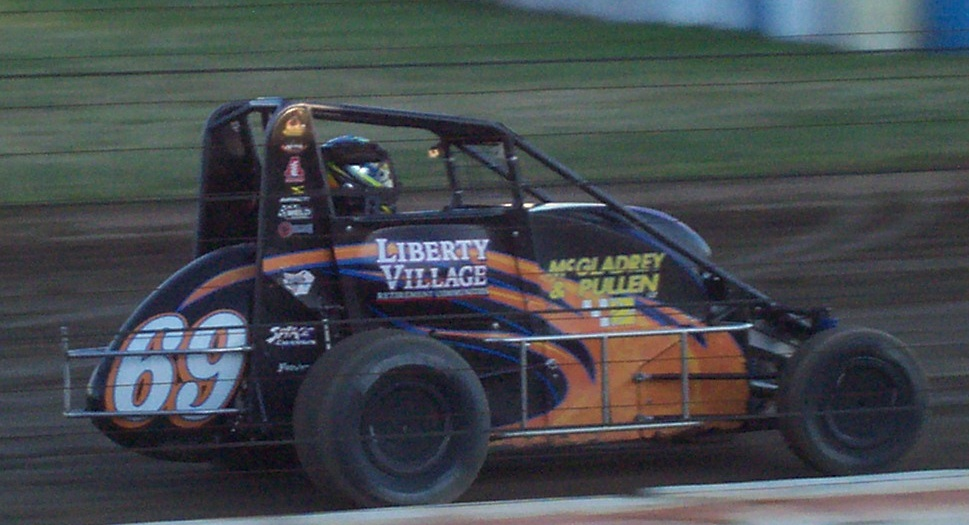
- Fike's midget car in 2008
- Born: December 29, 1980 (age 45); Galesburg, Illinois, U.S.
- Awards: 1999 USAC National Midget Series Rookie of the Year

NASCAR O'Reilly Auto Parts Series career
- 7 races run over 1 year
- Best finish: 68th (2005)
- First race: 2005 Hershey's Take 5 300 (Daytona)
- Last race: 2005 Sam's Town 250 (Atlanta)
Wins	Top tens	Poles
0	0	0

NASCAR FedEx Freight Truck Series career
- 2 races run over 2 years
- Best finish: 108th (2004)
- First race: 2003 Chevy Silverado 150 (Phoenix)
- Last race: 2004 O'Reilly 200 (Bristol)
Wins	Top tens	Poles
0	0	0
- Statistics up to date as of June 18, 2008.

A. J. Fike (born December 29, 1980) is an American professional racing driver. He is the older brother of NASCAR driver Aaron Fike. Fike won the 1999 United States Auto Club (USAC) Midget Car rookie of the year title and his younger brother Aaron Fike won the award the following season making them the first brothers to win the award in back to back seasons. He later drove in several NASCAR races.

== Racing career ==
=== ARCA ===
In Chevrolets and Pontiacs fielded by former ARCA RE/MAX Series driving champion Andy Hillenburg, Fike finished seventh in ARCA RE/MAX Series points in his first season on tour. In 50 career ARCA Series starts, he has eight top-five finishes and 19 top-tens with a career-best finish of second at Berlin Raceway in 2004. He scored his first career win in the ARCA series in 2015 when he led the most laps and won on a green-white-checkered finish at the Illinois State Fairgrounds in Springfield. Fike competed 15 of 20 ARCA Series events in 2016; he finished ninth in points with eight top-ten and three top-five finishes.

=== Open-wheel ===
Fike finished tenth in the Indianapolis Speedrome midget points in 1997. In 1998 he finished second in NAMARS Midgets points with three feature event victories. He joined the USAC National Midget Tour in 1999 and was the Rookie of the Year. Fike finished a career-best second in USAC Midget points in 2001 with two victories at Lakeside Speedway in Kansas and at the Belleville Midget Nationals, also in Kansas. He finished runner-up in USAC Midget Copper World Classic at Phoenix in 2001. He also finished sixth in USAC Midget national points in 2002; posting a win at Limaland Motorsports Park in Ohio. His career-best Silver Crown finish was a third in the Copper World Classic at Phoenix International Raceway in 2002. Fike also posted three top-ten Silver Crown finishes in five starts in 2002. He finished 11th in USAC Sprint national points in 2002 with two runner-up finishes.

Fike was the Pork Pole winner at the Springfield mile-dirt track. Fike also qualified second at DuQuoin & Berlin. His best superspeedway qualifying effort was tenth at Gateway. Fike led for 48 laps in two races. A veteran of USAC Sprint, Midget and Silver Crown Series competition, NAMARS, Badger and ARCA Midgets and go-karts.

After racing in NASCAR, Fike resumed racing in ARCA and Open Wheel. In 2009, he finished second in the USAC Silver Crown points.

=== NASCAR ===
==== Truck Series ====
Fike made two career starts in the Craftsman Truck Series. In 2003, Fike drove the No. 82 Ninetynine Racing Chevy at Phoenix. He started last in his debut, 36th in the field and finished 27th in the race, six laps off the pace. The next year, Fike would compete again for one race. He drove the No. 08 1-800-For-A-Phone Chevy at Bristol Motor Speedway for Green Light Racing. He once again started 36th and finished 33rd.

==== Busch Series ====
Fike began running the Busch Series part-time in 2005, splitting time with his brother Aaron in the No. 43 fielded by Curb Racing. He made his debut at the season opener at Daytona, starting 25th and finishing 30th. At Phoenix, A. J. made the field in 36th, but finished in 30th, one lap off the pace. He would race again at Nashville in June, securing his best career finish at that time of 28th. He was 32nd at Milwaukee Mile, 30th at Pikes Peak International Raceway and 33rd at IRP. A.J. started his last race of the season at Memphis Motorsports Park, finishing on the lead lap for the second time that season and finished 21st in his Liberty Village Dodge.

== Motorsports career results ==
=== NASCAR ===
(key) (Bold – Pole position awarded by qualifying time. Italics – Pole position earned by points standings or practice time. * – Most laps led.)

==== Busch Series ====
NASCAR Busch Series results
Year	Team	No.	Make	1	2	3	4	5	6	7	8	9	10	11	12	13	14	15	16	17	18	19	20	21	22	23	24	25	26	27	28	29	30	31	32	33	34	35	NBSC	Pts	Ref
2005	Curb Agajanian Performance Group	43	Dodge	DAY; 30	CAL	MXC	LVS	ATL	NSH	BRI	TEX	PHO; 30	TAL	DAR	RCH	CLT	DOV	NSH; 28	KEN	MLW; 32	DAY	CHI	NHA	PPR; 30	GTY; DNQ	IRP; 33	GLN	MCH	BRI	CAL	RCH	DOV	KAN	CLT	MEM; 21	TEX	PHO	HOM	68th	529	

==== Craftsman Truck Series ====
NASCAR Craftsman Truck Series results
Year	Team	No.	Make	1	2	3	4	5	6	7	8	9	10	11	12	13	14	15	16	17	18	19	20	21	22	23	24	25	NCTC	Pts	Ref
2003	Ninetynine Racing	82	Chevy	DAY	DAR	MMR	MAR	CLT	DOV	TEX	MEM	MLW	KAN	KEN	GTW	MCH	IRP	NSH	BRI	RCH	NHA	CAL	LVS	SBO	TEX	MAR	PHO; 27	HOM	116th	82	
2004	Green Light Racing	08	Chevy	DAY	ATL	MAR	MFD	CLT	DOV	TEX	MEM	MLW	KAN	KEN	GTW	MCH	IRP	NSH	BRI; 33	RCH	NHA	LVS	CAL	TEX	MAR	PHO	DAR	HOM	108th	64	

=== ARCA Racing Series ===
(key) (Bold – Pole position awarded by qualifying time. Italics – Pole position earned by points standings or practice time. * – Most laps led.)

ARCA Racing Series results
Year	Team	No.	Make	1	2	3	4	5	6	7	8	9	10	11	12	13	14	15	16	17	18	19	20	21	22	23	ARSC	Pts	Ref
2004	Fast Track Racing	11	Pontiac	DAY; 18	NSH; 10	SLM; 15	KEN; 17	TOL; 6	CLT; 12	KAN; 16	POC; 28		SBO; 9	BLN; 2		GTW; 3		LER; 6			TOL; 25				TAL; 18		7th	4715	
2004	Fast Track Racing	11	Chevy									MCH; 38			KEN; 25		POC; 28		NSH; 5	**ISF**; 20		DSF; 17	CHI; 8	SLM; 8			7th	4715	
2005	Fast Track Racing	10	Chevy	DAY	NSH	SLM	KEN	TOL	LAN	MIL	POC	MCH	KAN	KEN	BLN	POC	GTW	LER	NSH	MCH	ISF; 8	TOL					83rd	350	
2005	RFMS Racing	10	Chevy																				DSF; 17	CHI	SLM	TAL	83rd	350	
2006	RFMS Racing	12	Ford	DAY	NSH	SLM	WIN	KEN	TOL	POC	MCH	KAN	KEN	BLN	POC	GTW	NSH	MCH	ISF; 18	MIL	TOL	DSF; 6	CHI	SLM	TAL	IOW	83rd	355	
2007	RFMS Racing	12	Ford	DAY	USA	NSH	SLM	KAN	WIN	KEN	TOL	IOW	POC	MCH	BLN	KEN	POC	NSH	ISF; 35	MIL	GTW	**DSF**; 4	CHI	SLM	TAL	TOL	87th	285	
2008	RFMS Racing	12	Ford	DAY	SLM	IOW	KAN	CAR	KEN	TOL	POC	MCH	CAY	KEN	BLN	POC	NSH	ISF; 30	DSF; 26	CHI	SLM	NJE	TAL	TOL			102nd	180	
2009	RFMS Racing	10	Ford	DAY	SLM	CAR	TAL	KEN	TOL	POC	MCH	MFD	IOW	KEN	BLN	POC	ISF; 4	CHI	TOL	**DSF**; 4*	NJE	SLM	KAN	CAR			66th	445	
2010	RFMS Racing	10	Ford	DAY	PBE	SLM	TEX	TAL	TOL	POC	MCH	IOW	MFD	POC	BLN	NJE	ISF; 5	CHI	**DSF**; 25	TOL	SLM	KAN	CAR				65th	330	
2011	RFMS Racing	10	Ford	DAY	TAL	SLM	TOL	NJE	CHI	POC	MCH	WIN	BLN	IOW	IRP	POC	ISF; 28	MAD	DSF; 28	SLM	KAN	TOL					98th	180	
2012	RFMS Racing	18	Ford	DAY	MOB	SLM	TAL	TOL	ELK	POC	MCH	WIN	NJE	IOW	CHI	IRP	POC	BLN	ISF; 24	MAD	SLM	DSF; C	KAN				118th	110	
2013	RFMS Racing	11	Ford	DAY	MOB	SLM	TAL	TOL	ELK	POC	MCH	ROA	WIN	CHI	NJE	POC	BLN	ISF; 14	MAD	DSF; 9	IOW	SLM	KEN	KAN			71st	350	
2014	RFMS Racing	27	Ford	DAY	MOB	SLM	TAL	TOL	NJE	POC	MCH	ELK	WIN	CHI	IRP; 21	POC	BLN; 13	ISF; 13	MAD; 24	DSF; 11	SLM	KEN	KAN				32nd	750	
2015	RFMS Racing	27	Ford	DAY	MOB	NSH; 23	SLM	TAL	TOL; 4	NJE	POC	MCH	CHI	WIN; 10	IOW; 12	IRP; 12	POC	BLN; 10	ISF; 1*	DSF; 6	SLM; 7	KEN	KAN				18th	1645	
2016	RFMS Racing	27	Ford	DAY	NSH; 2	SLM; 14	TAL	TOL; 21	NJE	POC	MCH; 7	MAD; 8	WIN; 7	IOW; 12	IRP; 13	POC	BLN; 5	ISF; 2	DSF; 16	SLM; 10	CHI; 12	KEN; 8	KAN; 14				9th	2945	
2017	RFMS Racing	27	Ford	DAY; 34	NSH; 15	SLM; 15		TOL; 16	ELK; 9	POC; 18	MCH; 13	MAD; 12	IOW; 15	IRP; 15	POC; 20		ISF; 8	ROA	DSF; 22	SLM; 8	CHI	KEN	KAN				12th	2970	
2017	RFMS Racing	27	Chevy				TAL; 11																				12th	2970	
2017	Fast Track Racing	10	Toyota													WIN; 12											12th	2970	
