= Kevin Rutherford =

American racing driver

- Born: August 10, 1995 (age 31); Flower Mound, Texas, U.S.

ARCA Menards Series career
- 8 races run over 3 years
- Best finish: 50th (2015)
- First race: 2015 Troop Aid 200 (Nashville)
- Last race: 2015 Herr's Chase The Taste 200 (Winchester)
Wins	Top tens	Poles
0	1	0
- Statistics up to date as of February 11, 2025.

Kevin Rutherford (born August 10, 1995) is an American professional stock car racing driver who has previously competed in the ARCA Racing Series for three races in 2015, getting a best finish of twelfth at Toledo Speedway and Winchester Speedway.

Rutherford has also competed in series such as the United States Modified Touring Series, the USRA American Racer Modified Series, the Touring Outlaw Modified Series, and the United States Racing Association.

== Motorsports results ==
=== ARCA Racing Series ===
(key) (Bold – Pole position awarded by qualifying time. Italics – Pole position earned by points standings or practice time. * – Most laps led.)

ARCA Racing Series results
Year	Team	No.	Make	1	2	3	4	5	6	7	8	9	10	11	12	13	14	15	16	17	18	19	20	ARSC	Pts	Ref
2015	Mike Affarano Motorsports	03	Chevy	DAY	MOB	NSH; 21	SLM	TAL	TOL; 12	NJE	POC	MCH	CHI	WIN; 12	IOW	IRP	POC	BLN	ISF	DSF	SLM	KEN	KAN	50th	465	
