= Dale Matchett (racing driver) =

American racing driver

- Born: October 14, 1957 (age 69); Cherry Hill, New Jersey, U.S.

ARCA Menards Series career
- 11 races run over 5 years
- Best finish: 52nd (2015)
- First race: 2014 SuperChevyStores.com 100 (Springfield)
- Last race: 2018 ModSpace 150 (Pocono)
Wins	Top tens	Poles
0	0	0
- Statistics up to date as of February 4, 2025.

Dale Matchett (born October 14, 1957) is an American former professional stock car racing driver who has previously competed in the ARCA Racing Series from 2014 to 2018.

== Motorsports results ==
=== ARCA Racing Series ===
(key) (Bold – Pole position awarded by qualifying time. Italics – Pole position earned by points standings or practice time. * – Most laps led.)

ARCA Racing Series results
Year	Team	No.	Make	1	2	3	4	5	6	7	8	9	10	11	12	13	14	15	16	17	18	19	20	ARSC	Pts	Ref
2014	Wayne Peterson Racing	06	Ford	DAY	MOB	SLM	TAL	TOL	NJE	POC	MCH	ELK	WIN	CHI	IRP	POC	BLN	ISF; 25	MAD	DSF	SLM	KEN	KAN	127th	105	
2015	Wayne Peterson Racing	00	Chevy	DAY	MOB	NSH	SLM	TAL	TOL; 29															52nd	430	
2015	Wayne Peterson Racing	0	Ford							NJE; 21	POC; 22	MCH	CHI	WIN	IOW	IRP								52nd	430	
2015	Wayne Peterson Racing	08	Chevy														POC; 26	BLN	ISF	DSF	SLM	KEN	KAN	52nd	430	
2016	Wayne Peterson Racing	0	Ford	DAY	NSH	SLM	TAL	TOL	NJE; 25															75th	295	
2016	Wayne Peterson Racing	00	Chevy							POC; 31	MCH	MAD	WIN	IOW	IRP	POC; 23	BLN	ISF	DSF	SLM	CHI	KEN	KAN	75th	295	
2017	Wayne Peterson Racing	06	Chevy	DAY	NSH	SLM	TAL	TOL	ELK	POC; 30	MCH	MAD	IOW	IRP	POC; DNQ	WIN	ISF	ROA	DSF	SLM	CHI	KEN	KAN	114th	105	
2018	Wayne Peterson Racing	1	Ford	DAY	NSH	SLM	TAL	TOL	CLT	POC; 29	MCH	MAD	GTW	CHI	IOW	ELK								82nd	175	
2018	Wayne Peterson Racing	6	Chevy														POC; 28	ISF	BLN	DSF	SLM	IRP	KAN	82nd	175	
