= George Cushman =

American racing driver

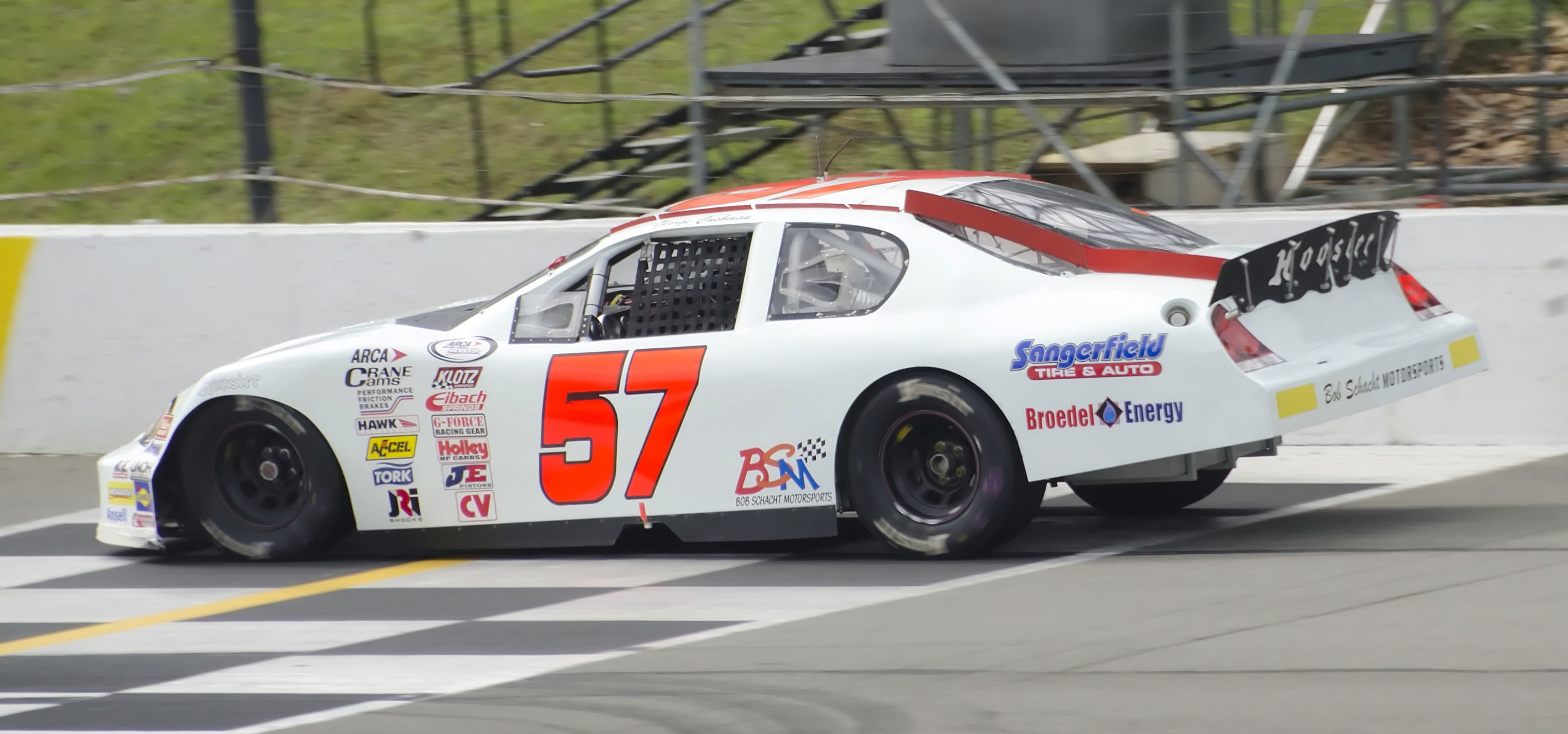
- Cushman's No. 57 ARCA car at Pocono Raceway in 2011
- Born: April 6, 1991 (age 35); Waterville, New York, U.S.

ARCA Menards Series career
- 18 races run over 5 years
- Best finish: 23rd (2013)
- First race: 2011 Pocono ARCA 200 (Pocono)
- Last race: 2016 General Tire#AnywhereIsPossible 200 (Pocono)
Wins	Top tens	Poles
0	1	0
- Statistics up to date as of July 7, 2023.

George Cushman (born April 6, 1993) is an American professional stock car racing driver who has previously competed in the ARCA Racing Series.

== Racing career ==
In 2011, Cushman would make his ARCA Racing Series debut at Pocono Raceway, driving the No. 7 Chevrolet for Bob Schacht Motorsports, where he would start eighteenth but finish 31st due to a crash. He would return to Pocono that year with Schacht, this time in the No. 57 Chevrolet in collaboration with Bill McCreery, where he would start nineteenth and finished fourteenth. In the following year, he would make select starts with his own team, with his first start coming at Daytona International Speedway in the No. 13 Dodge. Across those six starts, he would get a best finish of sixteenth at the season ending race at Kansas Speedway in the No. 7 Chevrolet. In 2013, he would make a number of starts for his own team, alongside a start for Roulo Brothers Racing in the No. 17 Ford at New Jersey Motorsports Park, and Hixson Motorsports in the No. 3 Chevrolet at Berlin Raceway.

After not making a start in the series in 2014, Cushman would return at Talladega Superspeedway in 2015, driving his self owned No. 7 Chevrolet, where he would finish in 23rd. He would return to Talladega the following year in the No. 13, where he would start 35th and finish in 27th due to being involved in a crash with seven laps to go. He would then make one more start at Pocono, where he would start 25th and finish five laps down in 24th. He has not competed in an ARCA race since then.

Cushman has recently competed in the Thunder on the Thruway Pro Stock Series.

== Motorsports results ==
=== ARCA Racing Series ===
(key) (Bold – Pole position awarded by qualifying time. Italics – Pole position earned by points standings or practice time. * – Most laps led.)

ARCA Racing Series results
Year	Team	No.	Make	1	2	3	4	5	6	7	8	9	10	11	12	13	14	15	16	17	18	19	20	21	ARSC	Pts	Ref
2011	Bob Schacht Motorsports	7	Chevy	DAY	TAL	SLM	TOL	NJE	CHI	POC; 31	MCH	WIN	BLN	IOW	IRP						KAN; DNQ	TOL			77th	260	
2011	Bob Schacht Motorsports	57	Chevy													POC; 14	ISF	MAD	DSF	SLM					77th	260	
2012	George Cushman Racing	13	Dodge	DAY; 35	MOB	SLM																			47th	460	
2012	George Cushman Racing	7	Dodge				TAL; 43	TOL	ELK																47th	460	
2012	George Cushman Racing	13	Chevy							POC; 27	MCH	WIN	NJE	IOW	CHI	IRP	POC; 20	BLN	ISF	MAD	SLM	DSF			47th	460	
2012	George Cushman Racing	7	Chevy																				KAN; 16		47th	460	
2013	George Cushman Racing	13	Dodge	DAY; DNQ	MOB	SLM																			23rd	1265	
2013	George Cushman Racing	13	Chevy				TAL; 8	TOL	ELK	POC; 12	MCH	ROA	WIN	CHI		POC; 34					IOW; 27	SLM	KEN; 17	KAN; 16	23rd	1265	
2013	Roulo Brothers Racing	17	Ford												NJM; 30										23rd	1265	
2013	Hixson Motorsports	3	Chevy														BLN; 26	ISF	MAD	DSF					23rd	1265	
2015	George Cushman Racing	7	Chevy	DAY	MOB	NSH	SLM	TAL; 23	TOL	NJE	POC	MCH	CHI	WIN	IOW	IRP	POC	BLN	ISF	DSF	SLM	KEN	KAN		119th	115	
2016	George Cushman Racing	13	Chevy	DAY	NSH	SLM	TAL; 27	TOL	NJE	POC; 24	MCH	MAD	WIN	IOW	IRP	POC	BLN	ISF	DSF	SLM	CHI	KEN	KAN		91st	205	
