= Matt Wallace (racing driver) =

American racing driver (born 1995)

- Born: October 24, 1995 (age 31) Concord, North Carolina, U.S.
- Relatives: Mike Wallace (father); Rusty Wallace (uncle); Kenny Wallace (uncle); Chrissy Wallace (sister); Steve Wallace (cousin)

ARCA Racing Series career
- Debut season: 2015
- Former teams: Kimmel Racing
- Starts: 2
- Wins: 0
- Poles: 0
- Best finish: 73rd in 2015
- Finished last season: 73rd (2015)

NASCAR O'Reilly Auto Parts Series career
- 2 races run over 1 year
- 2015 position: 63rd
- Best finish: 63rd (2015)
- First race: 2015 Lakes Region 200 (New Hampshire)
- Last race: 2015 U.S. Cellular 250 (Iowa)
Wins	Top tens	Poles
0	0	0
- Statistics up to date as of January 21, 2020.

Matthew Wallace (born October 24, 1995) is an American professional stock car racing driver. He is a member of the Wallace family, which includes his father Mike and uncles Rusty and Kenny, each former NASCAR drivers who successfully competed in the sport for decades. His sister Chrissy and cousin Steve have both also had careers in NASCAR.

== Career ==
=== ARCA Racing Series ===
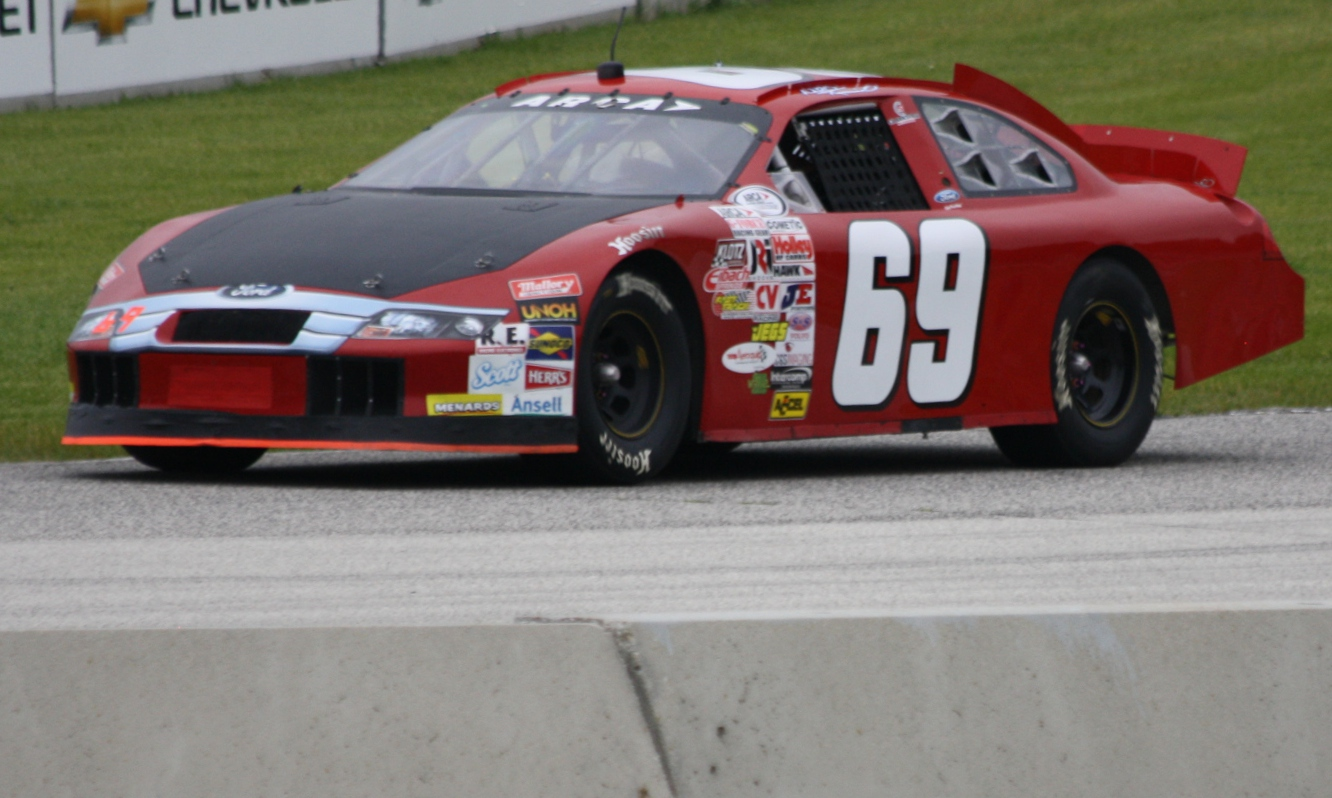
Wallace made two ARCA starts in the No. 69 Ford for Kimmel Racing.

Wallace made his debut in stock cars in the ARCA race at Toledo Speedway, driving the No. 69 for Kimmel Racing, where he would go on to finish tenth in that race. Mike Wallace was friends with team owner Bill Kimmel, which is how the deal was put together for Matt to race for Kimmel's ARCA team. It was later revealed that he would return to the same car at IRP in July.

Wallace tested at ARCA's Daytona test session in January 2016 leading up to the race at the track in February. He drove the No. 22 Dodge for Cunningham Motorsports, sharing the car in the session with Kevin Thomas Jr, who was set to be the full-time driver of that car for the 2016 season. However, Wallace's crew chief Paul Andrews did state that Cunningham would try to field an additional car for him at Daytona if sponsorship could be found (and it was not).

=== NASCAR Xfinity Series ===
On July 10, 2015, it was announced that Wallace would make his debut in the Xfinity Series at the New Hampshire race later that month, driving for JGL Racing, the same team that his father Mike drove for in many races in 2014 as well as Daytona in 2015 and his uncle Kenny raced for earlier that year at Talladega. In addition, he was also scheduled to pilot the car at Iowa and other races yet to be determined, although he only ended up driving at Iowa.

Although he made his debut in the series in 2015, Wallace did have a chance to do so one season earlier, as at the Daytona night race in 2014. Mike Wallace, JGL, and his sponsor for that race, Smith Transportation, agreed that if Mike got a top-five finish, the team would give Matt one race in the team's No. 93 car and he could pick which one. Although his father did finish in the top-ten in the race, it was not a top-five, so Matt did not get to run for the team that year.

=== Late Model Racing ===
Wallace has not made any NASCAR or ARCA starts since 2015, but he is still racing, competing in super late model events in the CARS Series, sometimes against his cousin Steve, who also now competes in CARS late models after competing full-time for several years in the Xfinity Series. In 2019, he launched his own driver development program to give other drivers an opportunity to compete in super late models as well. His father Mike and late model car builder Robert Hamke assisted Matt in this effort.

== Personal life ==
Wallace grew up in the Charlotte, North Carolina area (where the majority of race teams are based) although his family is from St. Louis. He started racing at the age of eight in bandoleros. When he was twelve and thirteen, he raced legends cars, and then pro late models by the age of fourteen. When he made his debut in both ARCA and Xfinity in 2015, he was attending classes at Rowan-Cabarrus Community College, and expressed a desire to attend UNC-Charlotte after graduating from RCCC, studying business administration at both schools.

== Motorsports career results ==
=== NASCAR ===
(key) (Bold – Pole position awarded by qualifying time. Italics – Pole position earned by points standings or practice time. * – Most laps led.)

==== Xfinity Series ====
NASCAR Xfinity Series results
Year	Team	No.	Make	1	2	3	4	5	6	7	8	9	10	11	12	13	14	15	16	17	18	19	20	21	22	23	24	25	26	27	28	29	30	31	32	33	NXSC	Pts	Ref
2015	JGL Racing	26	Toyota	DAY	ATL	LVS	PHO	CAL	TEX	BRI	RCH	TAL	IOW	CLT	DOV	MCH	CHI	DAY	KEN	NHA; 33	IND	IOW; 25	GLN	MOH	BRI	ROA	DAR	RCH	CHI	KEN	DOV	CLT	KAN	TEX	PHO	HOM	63rd	30	

^{*} Season still in progress
^{1} Ineligible for series points

=== ARCA Racing Series ===
ARCA Racing Series results
Year	Team	No.	Make	1	2	3	4	5	6	7	8	9	10	11	12	13	14	15	16	17	18	19	20	ARSC	Pts	Ref
2015	Kimmel Racing	69	Ford	DAY	MOB	NSH	SLM	TAL	TOL; 10	NJE	POC	MCH	CHI	WIN	IOW	IRP; 13	POC	BLN	ISF	DSF	SLM	KEN	KAN	73rd	330	

=== CARS Super Late Model Tour ===
(key)

CARS Super Late Model Tour results
Year	Team	No.	Make	1	2	3	4	5	6	7	8	9	10	11	12	13	CSLMTC	Pts	Ref
2017	Mike Wallace	6W	Chevy	CON	DOM	DOM	HCY	HCY	BRI	AND	ROU	TCM	ROU; 8	HCY; 9	CON; 4	SBO	15th	78	
2018	Mike Wallace	6W	Chevy	MYB	NSH; 17	ROU	HCY	BRI		HCY; 17	ROU	SBO; 7					28th	42	
2018	Mike Wallace	6	Chevy						AND; 7								28th	42	
2019	Mike Wallace	6W	Chevy	SNM; 24	HCY	NSH	MMS; 16	BRI; 14	HCY	ROU; 8	SBO						15th	71	
