= Brad Smith Motorsports =

Former NASCAR and ARCA race team

- Owner(s): Brad Smith; Jeff Smith; James Hylton (1966–2018); Bud Hartje (1966–1967)
- Base: Shelby Township, Michigan
- Series: NASCAR Cup Series (1966–1995); ARCA Menards Series; ARCA Menards Series East; ARCA Menards Series West
- Race drivers: ARCA Menards Series: No. 48 Brad Smith; ARCA Menards Series East: No. 48 Brad Smith; ARCA Menards Series West: No. 48 Brad Smith (part-time)
- Manufacturer: Ford; Chevrolet
- Opened: 1966

Career
- Debut: 1966 Motor Trend 500 at Riverside
- Races competed: 1,414 (ARCA & Cup)
- Drivers' Championships: 0
- Race victories: 5 (including Paul Menard as the original Brad Smith's team at Talladega in 2003)
- Pole positions: 5

Brad Smith Motorsports (formerly known as Hartje Racing, Hylton Engineering and James Hylton Motorsports) is a former NASCAR and current ARCA race team. It was one of the oldest professional race teams in the United States, running from 1964 to 1994; 1997–99; 2001–2018. The team won two NASCAR Winston Cup Series races with James Hylton driving, the 1970 Richmond 500 and the 1972 Talladega 500. The team ran for many years in the Winston Cup before closing in 1995. The team was revived in 2007 when Hylton leased a car and a motor from Richard Childress Racing with the intent of becoming the oldest driver to start both the Daytona 500 and a NASCAR race. He then picked up sponsorship from Retirement Living TV. During practice, Hylton turned in a time of 48.150 seconds, which ranked him 15th. During the Duel race, Hylton was in a transfer position until, on the final restart, he lost second gear and was unable to accelerate, and wound 22nd. Despite not making the race, Hylton stated that he did what he had wanted. His goal was to show that even though he was over 20 years older than any other driver, he could still be competitive.

After James Hylton died in a travel accident in 2018, driver Brad Smith and the rest of the team has kept competing in the ARCA Menards Series, racing under the name Brad Smith Motorsports.

== Present ==
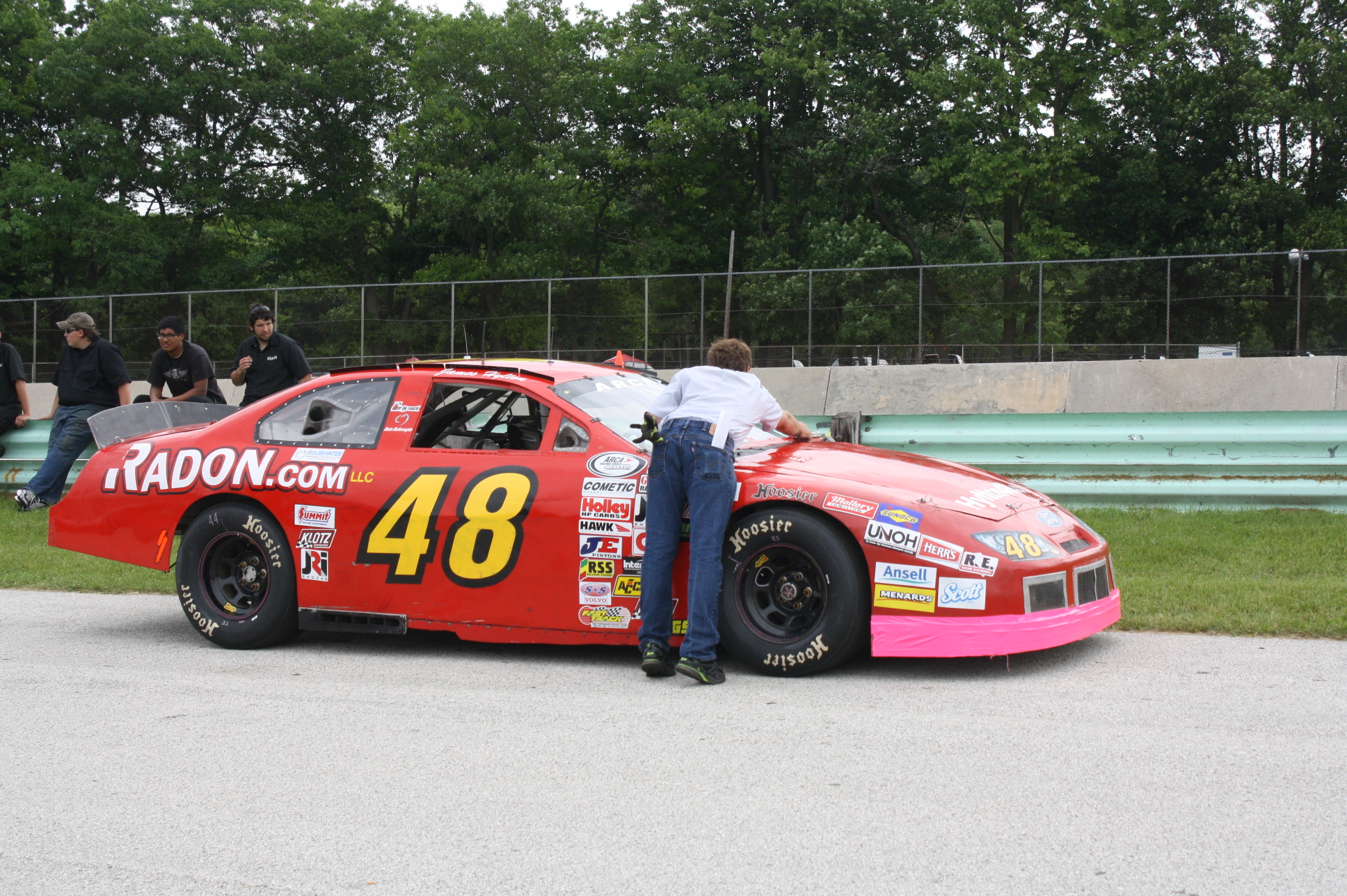
An ARCA inspector checking Hylton's car in 2013

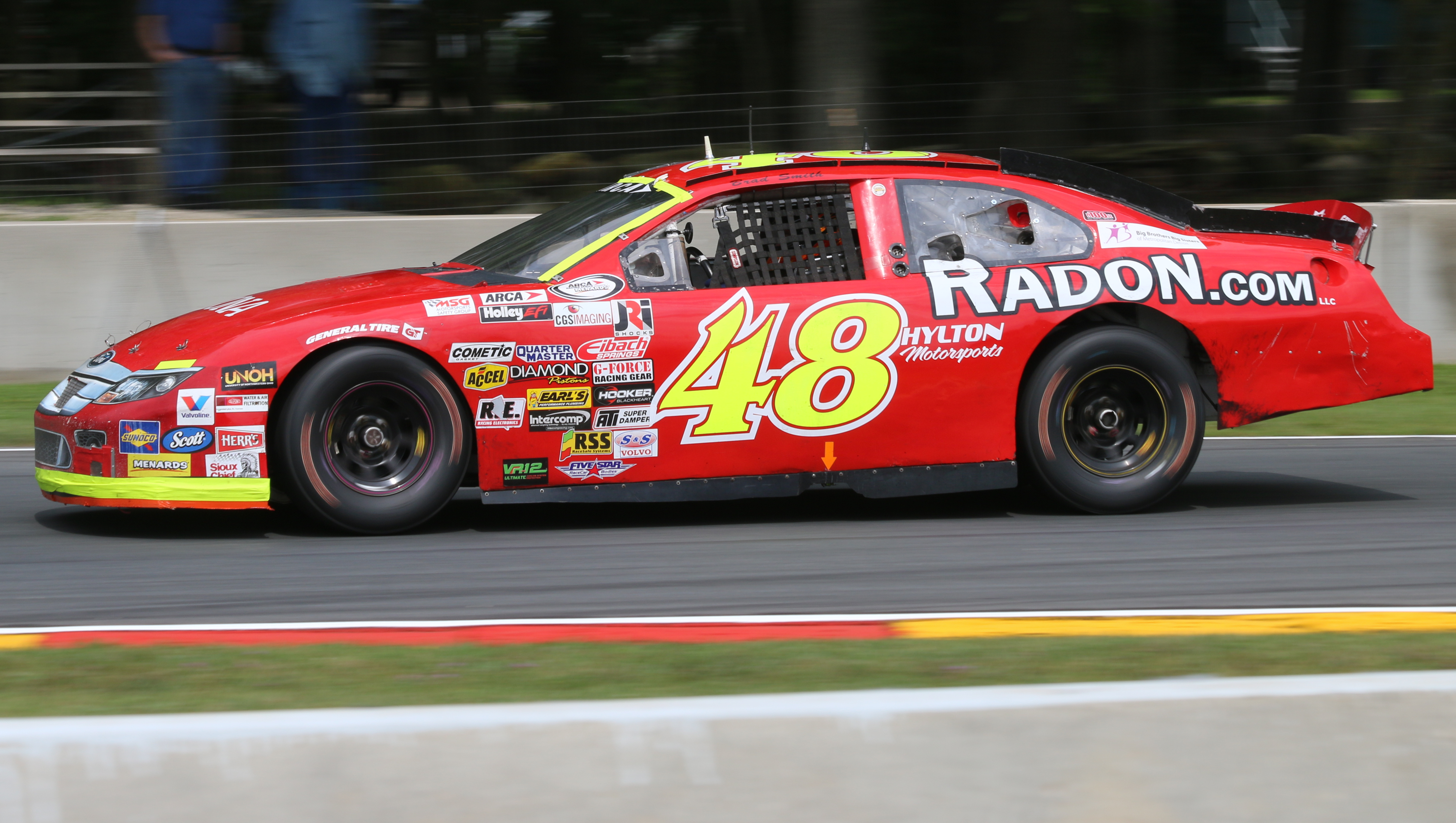
Brad Smith in the #48 car in 2017

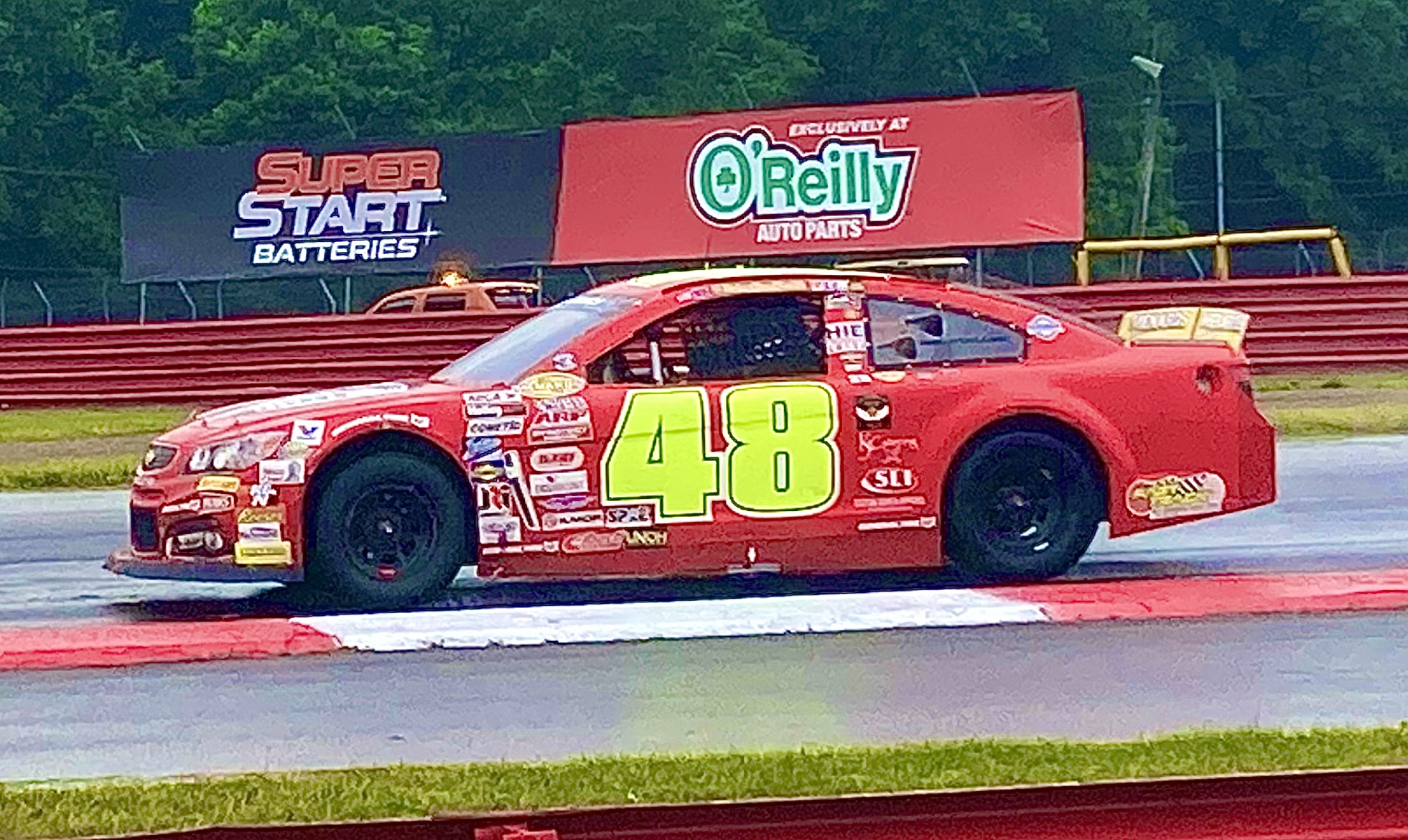
Smith in the #48 car at Mid-Ohio in 2022.

After Hylton retired in 2013 as driver, he hired Sean Corr to drive the 2014 season. In his first race with the team, he got a top 10. During the 2014 season, races that Sean Corr was racing, it was an alliance between Hylton's team and Corr's family owned Empire Racing. For 2015, Corr ran in Daytona, and was then replaced by Brad Smith.

During the ARCA 200 at Talladega, Austin Wayne Self spun in the Tri-oval, and collected Smith's, Radon.com Ford. Smith's car slammed the outside wall and then slid toward the inside wall. Just before impact, Smith's car hit a dip in the track and the front end shot off the ground. After impact with the inside wall, while still running at over 100 mph, the car slid up in turns 1 and 2 before sliding down to the infield. Smith was taken to a local hospital, where he had surgery on both ankles. Driver James Swanson took over in place of Smith, finishing the season for the team.

Corr returned to Daytona in 2016, while Brad Smith took over for the rest of the season. Smith was to run a second car, the 49, but the car was not prepared in time. Smith was able to score a career-high 6th place in points in 2016, followed by another top 10 points finish in 2017.

The beginning of the 2018 season would prove to be disastrous. With ARCA switching over to composite bodies, the team had acquired a new composite Ford body. While having a strong run at Daytona, Smith was involved in the late-race "big one". The following races would prove trying as well. Problems at Nashville relegated the team to a 22nd-place finish. The next race would be even worse, as the team was forced to withdraw from Salem after losing their only motor in practice. Talladega would prove no better, as the team was continuing to have issues. Before the green flag, Smith would pull the 48 down pit road with oil pressure issues, which could not be fixed, and relegated the team to the last position.

Tragedy would strike the team shortly after. While traveling back to the shop, team owner James Hylton, his son James "Tweet" Hylton Jr., and crew chief Terry Strange were involved in a single-vehicle accident on I-85 in Georgia. Strange was driving when he lost control of the team's GMC truck, which was hauling the race car and all the equipment and struck an embankment. Both Hyltons' died, while Strange was taken to the hospital with several broken bones. James Sr. was 83, and James Jr. was 61. The accident is currently under investigation by the Georgia State Patrol. The future of the team was in question, although the 48 car was entered under the Hylton banner with Brad Smith listed as the owner and as the driver for the race in Toledo, Ohio. The team has run every race since Smith took ownership, and the team now runs as Brad Smith Motorsports.

In 2020, Smith achieved his first ever top 10 finish at Winchester Speedway.

In 2021, Smith would achieve his best points finish of his career, finishing fifth in the final standings despite running at the finish in only three races and missing Daytona due to suffering a detached retina while chipping ice.

Smith and the 48 would return in 2022, starting off with a 28th place finish at Daytona.
