= Mike Abram =

American racing driver

- Born: October 2, 1979 (age 47); Elida, Ohio, U.S.

ARCA Menards Series career
- 3 races run over 1 year
- Best finish: 26th (2015)
- First race: 2015 Menards 200 Presented by Federated Car Care (Toledo)
- Last race: 2015 Full Throttle S'loonshine 98.9 (Kansas)
| Wins | Top tens | Poles |
|---|---|---|
| 0 | 0 | 0 |
- Statistics up to date as of February 11, 2025.

Mike Abram (born October 2, 1979) is an American former professional stock car racing driver who has previously competed in the ARCA Racing Series for several races in 2015, getting a best finish of 21st at the DuQuoin State Fairgrounds dirt track.

== Motorsports results ==
=== ARCA Racing Series ===
(key) (Bold – Pole position awarded by qualifying time. Italics – Pole position earned by points standings or practice time. * – Most laps led.)

ARCA Racing Series results
| Year | Team | No. | Make | 1 | 2 | 3 | 4 | 5 | 6 | 7 | 8 | 9 | 10 | 11 | 12 | 13 | 14 | 15 | 16 | 17 | 18 | 19 | 20 | ARSC | Pts | Ref |
|---|---|---|---|---|---|---|---|---|---|---|---|---|---|---|---|---|---|---|---|---|---|---|---|---|---|---|
| 2015 | Wayne Peterson Racing | 06 | Ford | DAY | MOB | NSH | SLM | TAL | TOL; 31 | | | | | | | | | | | | | | | 26th | 1065 | |
| 2015 | Wayne Peterson Racing | 08 | Chevy | | | | | | | NJE; 29 | POC | MCH | CHI | | | | | | | | | | | 26th | 1065 | |
| 2015 | Wayne Peterson Racing | 00 | Chevy | | | | | | | | | | | WIN; 25 | | | | BLN; 27 | ISF; 31 | | SLM; 30 | KEN | | 26th | 1065 | |
| 2015 | Wayne Peterson Racing | 00 | Dodge | | | | | | | | | | | | IOW; 31 | IRP; 34 | | | | | | | | 26th | 1065 | |
| 2015 | Max Force Racing | 9 | Ford | | | | | | | | | | | | | | POC; 32 | | | | | | | 26th | 1065 | |
| 2015 | Wayne Peterson Racing | 0 | Ford | | | | | | | | | | | | | | | | | DSF; 21 | | | | 26th | 1065 | |
| 2015 | Dale Shearer Racing | 73 | Chevy | | | | | | | | | | | | | | | | | | | | KAN; 33 | 26th | 1065 | |
