= Michael Womack =

American racing driver

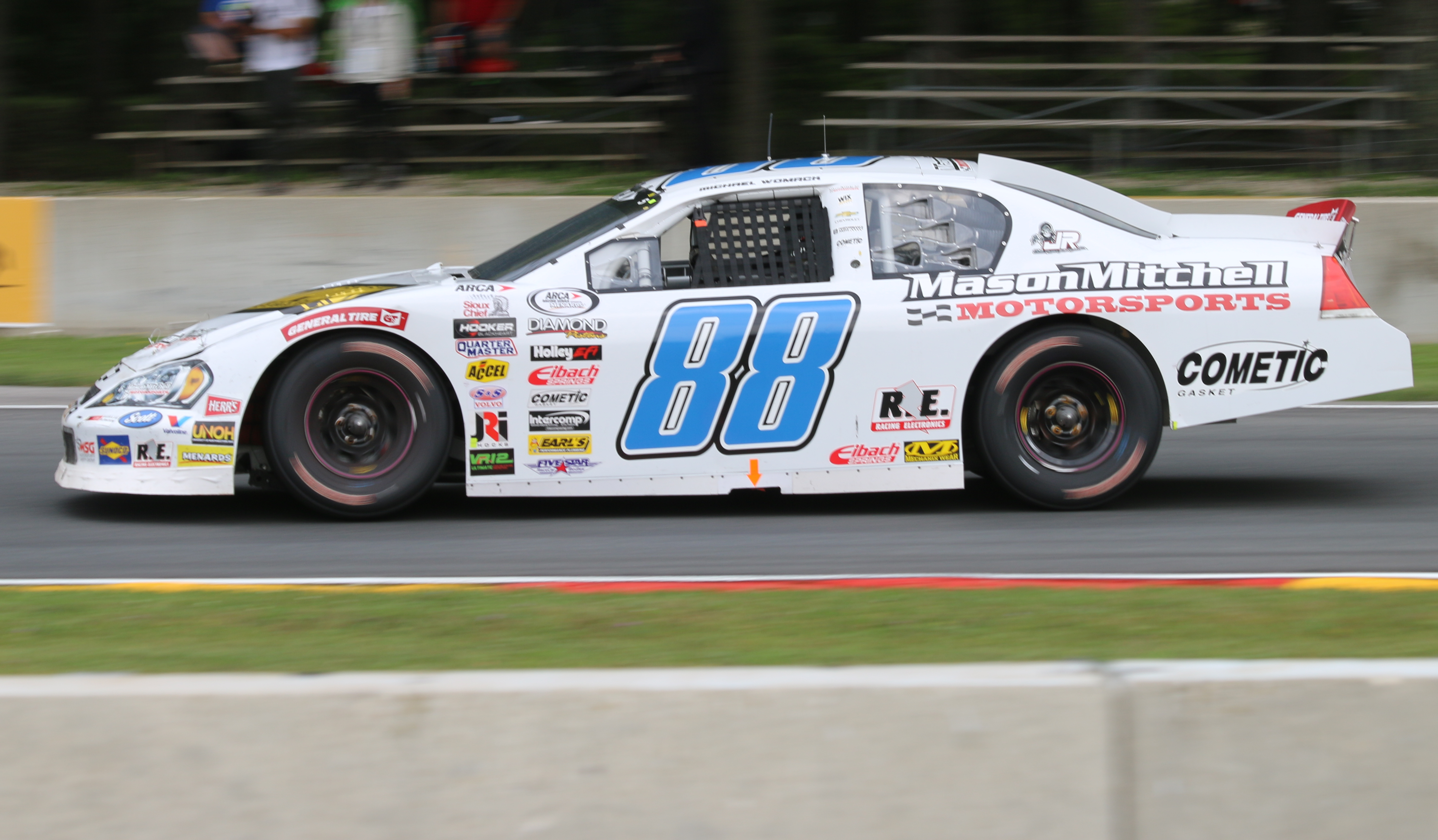
- Womack's No. 88 car at Road America in 2017
- Born: December 28, 1999 (age 26); Romoland, California, U.S.

ARCA Menards Series career
- 1 race run over 1 year
- Best finish: 79th (2017)
- First race: 2017 Road America 100 (Road America)
Wins	Top tens	Poles
0	1	0
- Statistics up to date as of February 5, 2025.

Michael Womack (born December 28, 1999) is an American former professional stock car racing driver who has previously competed in the ARCA Racing Series.

Womack has previously competed in the Lucas Oil Modified Series, the SRL Legends Tour, the INEX Summer Shootout, and the Thursday Thunder Legends Racing Series.

== Motorsports results ==
=== ARCA Racing Series ===
(key) (Bold – Pole position awarded by qualifying time. Italics – Pole position earned by points standings or practice time. * – Most laps led.)

ARCA Racing Series results
Year	Team	No.	Make	1	2	3	4	5	6	7	8	9	10	11	12	13	14	15	16	17	18	19	20	ARSC	Pts	Ref
2017	Mason Mitchell Motorsports	88	Chevy	DAY	NSH	SLM	TAL	TOL	ELK	POC	MCH	MAD	IOW	IRP	POC	WIN	ISF	ROA; 5	DSF	SLM	CHI	KEN	KAN	79th	205	
