= 2017 ARCA Racing Series =

65th season of the ARCA Racing Series

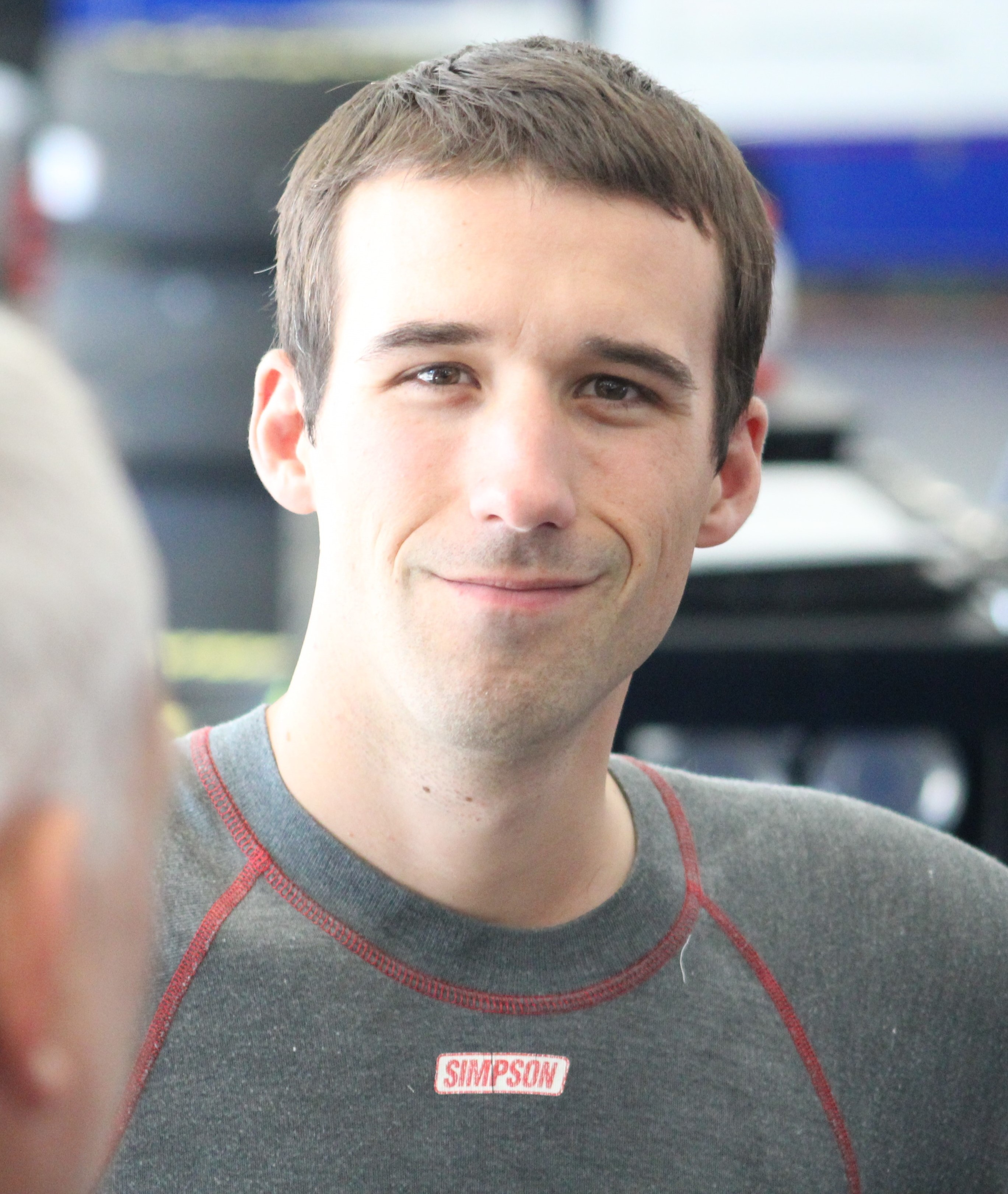
Austin Theriault, the 2017 ARCA champion.

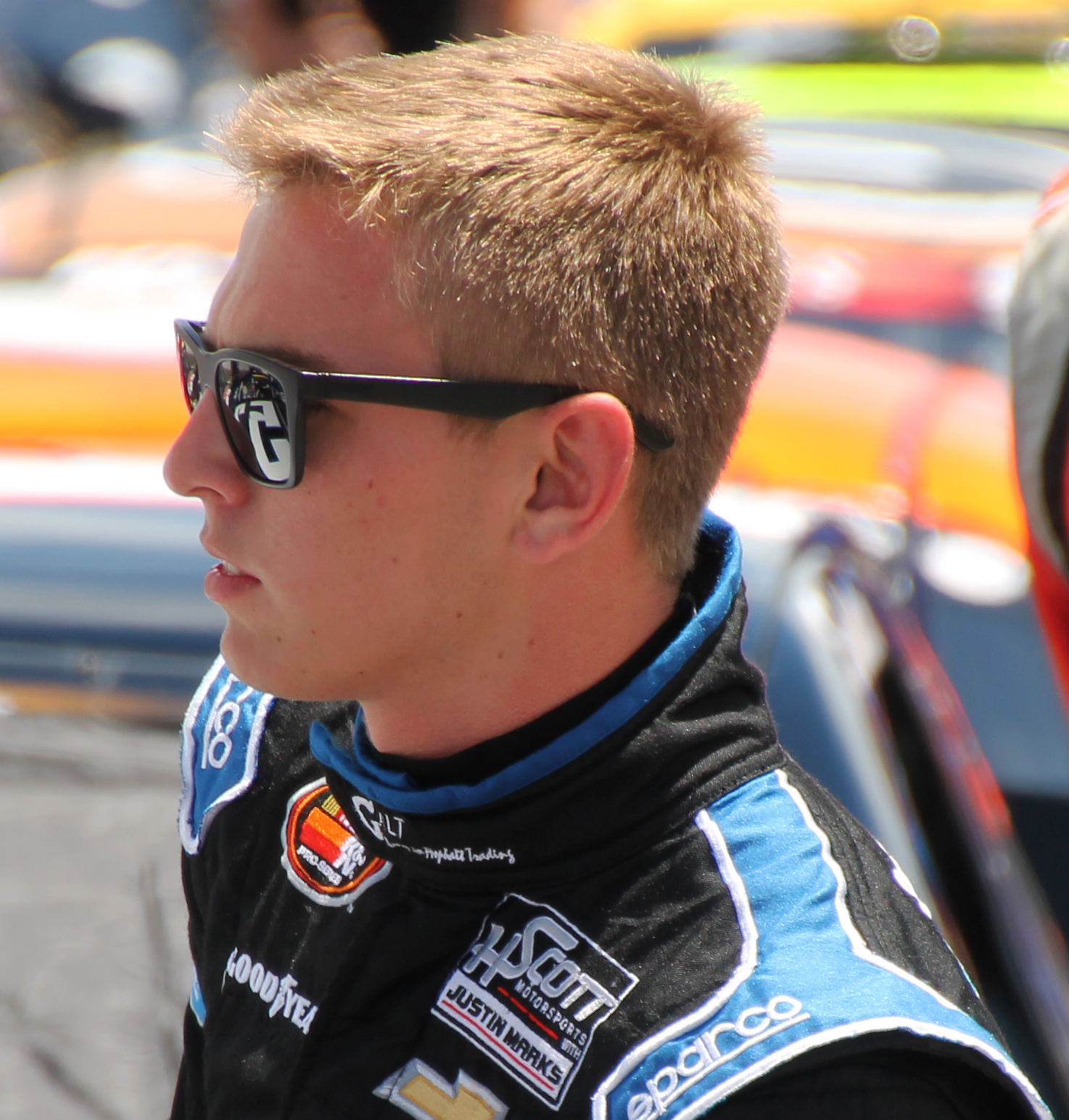
Dalton Sargeant finished second behind Theriault in the championship.

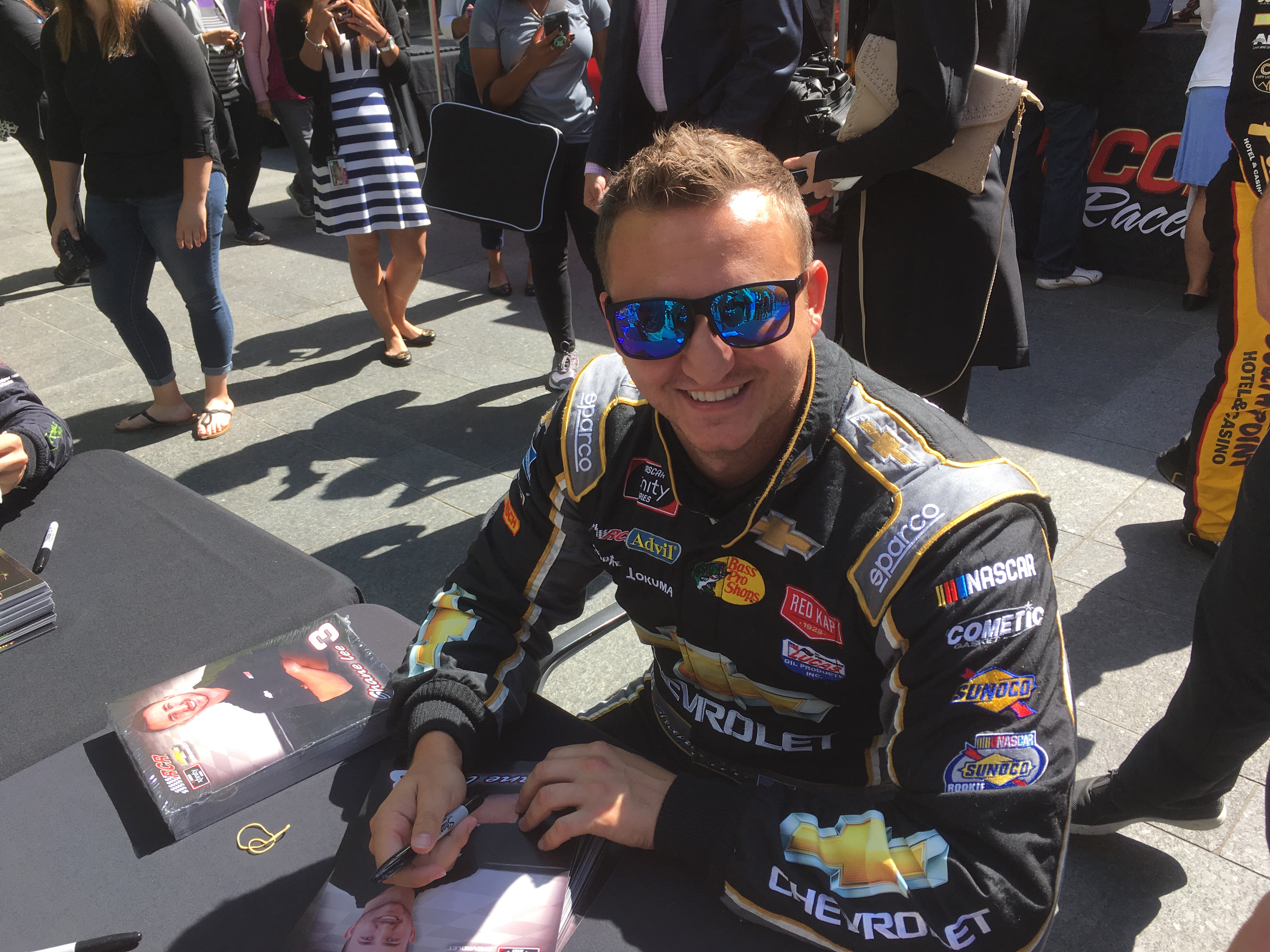
Shane Lee finished third in the championship.

The 2017 ARCA Racing Series presented by Menards was the 65th season of the ARCA Racing Series. The season began on February 18 with the Lucas Oil 200 Driven by General Tire and ended on October 20 with the Kansas 150. Austin Theriault, driving for Ken Schrader Racing, won the drivers' championship on the strength of seven wins. Dalton Sargeant, winner of three races, was runner-up to Theriault.

== Teams and drivers ==
=== Complete schedule ===
Manufacturer	Team	No.	Driver
Chevrolet	Bret Holmes Racing	23	Bret Holmes (R)
Chevrolet	Mason Mitchell Motorsports	78	Kyle Weatherman 7
Chevrolet	Mason Mitchell Motorsports	78	Tyler Roahrig 1
Chevrolet	Mason Mitchell Motorsports	78	Cole Anderson 1
Chevrolet	Mason Mitchell Motorsports	78	Ryan Repko 1
Chevrolet	Mason Mitchell Motorsports	78	Trevor Noles 1
Chevrolet	Mason Mitchell Motorsports	78	Justin Haley 2
Chevrolet	Mason Mitchell Motorsports	78	Chase Purdy 2
Chevrolet	Mason Mitchell Motorsports	78	Sheldon Creed 2
Chevrolet	Mason Mitchell Motorsports	78	Myatt Snider 1
Chevrolet	Mason Mitchell Motorsports	78	Blaine Perkins 1
Ford	Mason Mitchell Motorsports	78	Cole Custer 1
Ford	Cunningham Motorsports	22	Shane Lee
Ford	Cunningham Motorsports	77	Dalton Sargeant
Ford	James Hylton Motorsports	48	Brad Smith
Ford	Max Force Racing	9	Thomas Praytor
Ford	RFMS Racing	27	A. J. Fike 15
Ford	RFMS Racing	27	Travis Braden 4
Ford	RFMS Racing	27	P. J. Jones 1
Toyota	Joe Gibbs Racing	18	Matt Tifft 1
Toyota	Joe Gibbs Racing	18	Riley Herbst (R) 19
Toyota	Venturini Motorsports	15	Leilani Münter 1
Toyota	Venturini Motorsports	15	Christian Eckes 10
Toyota	Venturini Motorsports	15	Spencer Davis 2
Toyota	Venturini Motorsports	15	Kyle Benjamin 1
Toyota	Venturini Motorsports	15	Noah Gragson 3
Toyota	Venturini Motorsports	15	Tanner Thorson 1
Toyota	Venturini Motorsports	15	Cole Rouse 2
Toyota	Venturini Motorsports	25	Tom Hessert III 5
Toyota	Venturini Motorsports	25	Raphaël Lessard 3
Toyota	Venturini Motorsports	25	Natalie Decker 6
Toyota	Venturini Motorsports	25	Spencer Davis 4
Toyota	Venturini Motorsports	25	Tanner Thorson 1
Toyota	Venturini Motorsports	25	Christopher Bell 1
Toyota	Venturini Motorsports	55	Noah Gragson 2
Toyota	Venturini Motorsports	55	Zane Smith (R) 11
Toyota	Venturini Motorsports	55	Frankie Kimmel 2
Toyota	Venturini Motorsports	55	Bo LeMastus 2
Toyota	Venturini Motorsports	55	Tom Berte 1
Toyota	Venturini Motorsports	55	Natalie Decker 1
Toyota	Venturini Motorsports	55	Spencer Davis 1
Toyota	Win-Tron Racing	32	Gus Dean
Toyota	Win-Tron Racing	33	Justin Fontaine (R) 13
Toyota	Win-Tron Racing	33	Mason Mingus 2
Toyota	Win-Tron Racing	33	Terry Jones 1 (Note: Entry was fielded in a collaboration with Rette Jones Racing.)
Toyota	Win-Tron Racing	33	Tyler Dippel 3
Toyota	Win-Tron Racing	33	Austin Wayne Self 1
Chevrolet 2 Ford 14 Toyota 4	Ken Schrader Racing	52	Austin Theriault (R)
Chevrolet 9 Ford 11	Hixson Motorsports	2	Eric Caudell (R)
Chevrolet 17 Ford 3	Hixson Motorsports 17; Ciccarelli Racing 1 Universe Racing 2	3	Mike Senica 5
Chevrolet 17 Ford 3	Hixson Motorsports 17; Ciccarelli Racing 1 Universe Racing 2	3	Steve Fox 3 (Note: Fox drove for Hixson Motorsports at Salem in April and at both Pocono races for Universe Racing in a collaboration with Hixson.)
Chevrolet 17 Ford 3	Hixson Motorsports 17; Ciccarelli Racing 1 Universe Racing 2	3	Ray Ciccarelli 1 (Note: It was a Ciccarelli Racing entry using Fast Track Racing's owner points.)
Chevrolet 17 Ford 3	Hixson Motorsports 17; Ciccarelli Racing 1 Universe Racing 2	3	Bobby Dale Earnhardt 3
Chevrolet 17 Ford 3	Hixson Motorsports 17; Ciccarelli Racing 1 Universe Racing 2	3	Rick Tackman Jr. 3
Chevrolet 17 Ford 3	Hixson Motorsports 17; Ciccarelli Racing 1 Universe Racing 2	3	Ron Cox 1
Chevrolet 17 Ford 3	Hixson Motorsports 17; Ciccarelli Racing 1 Universe Racing 2	3	Joe Cooksey 2
Chevrolet 17 Ford 3	Hixson Motorsports 17; Ciccarelli Racing 1 Universe Racing 2	3	Darrell Basham 1
Chevrolet 17 Ford 3	Hixson Motorsports 17; Ciccarelli Racing 1 Universe Racing 2	3	Richard Hauck 1
Chevrolet 5 Dodge 12 Ford 3	Wayne Peterson Racing	0	Con Nicolopoulos 14
Chevrolet 5 Dodge 12 Ford 3	Wayne Peterson Racing	0	Don Thompson 2
Chevrolet 5 Dodge 12 Ford 3	Wayne Peterson Racing	0	Mark Meunier 3
Chevrolet 5 Dodge 12 Ford 3	Wayne Peterson Racing	0	James Swanson 1
Chevrolet 19 (Note: Initially at Iowa, the No. 0 car was a Chevrolet and No. 06 was a Dodge. The Dodge suffered an engine failure, so the team ran the No. 06 as a Chevrolet in the race while the No. 0 withdrew.) Ford 1	Wayne Peterson Racing	06	Scott Edwards 1
Chevrolet 19 Ford 1	Wayne Peterson Racing	06	Mark Blasingim 1
Chevrolet 19 Ford 1	Wayne Peterson Racing	06	Mark Meunier 11
Chevrolet 19 Ford 1	Wayne Peterson Racing	06	Don Thompson 1
Chevrolet 19 Ford 1	Wayne Peterson Racing	06	Dale Matchett 2
Chevrolet 19 Ford 1	Wayne Peterson Racing	06	Con Nicolopoulos 4
Chevrolet 2 Toyota 9 Dodge 1 Ford 8	Fast Track Racing 19; Hillenburg-Schrader Racing 1	10	Ed Pompa 7
Chevrolet 2 Toyota 9 Dodge 1 Ford 8	Fast Track Racing 19; Hillenburg-Schrader Racing 1	10	Rick Clifton 1
Chevrolet 2 Toyota 9 Dodge 1 Ford 8	Fast Track Racing 19; Hillenburg-Schrader Racing 1	10	Tony Mrakovich 1
Chevrolet 2 Toyota 9 Dodge 1 Ford 8	Fast Track Racing 19; Hillenburg-Schrader Racing 1	10	Austin Nemire 1
Chevrolet 2 Toyota 9 Dodge 1 Ford 8	Fast Track Racing 19; Hillenburg-Schrader Racing 1	10	James Swanson 1
Chevrolet 2 Toyota 9 Dodge 1 Ford 8	Fast Track Racing 19; Hillenburg-Schrader Racing 1	10	Morgen Baird 1
Chevrolet 2 Toyota 9 Dodge 1 Ford 8	Fast Track Racing 19; Hillenburg-Schrader Racing 1	10	Dick Doheny 2
Chevrolet 2 Toyota 9 Dodge 1 Ford 8	Fast Track Racing 19; Hillenburg-Schrader Racing 1	10	Zach Ralston 3
Chevrolet 2 Toyota 9 Dodge 1 Ford 8	Fast Track Racing 19; Hillenburg-Schrader Racing 1	10	A. J. Fike 1
Chevrolet 2 Toyota 9 Dodge 1 Ford 8	Fast Track Racing 19; Hillenburg-Schrader Racing 1	10	Tyler Speer 2
Ford 9 Chevrolet 1	Kimmel Racing	69	Ricky Sanders 2
Ford 9 Chevrolet 1	Kimmel Racing	69	Will Kimmel 8
Toyota	Kimmel Racing	69	Nick Higdon 9
Toyota	Kimmel Racing	69	Bo LeMastus 1
Ford 4 Chevrolet 16	Mullins Racing 4 Darrell Basham Racing 16	34	Willie Mullins 4
Ford 4 Chevrolet 16	Mullins Racing 4 Darrell Basham Racing 16	34	Mike Basham 16

=== Limited schedule ===
Manufacturer	Team	No.	Driver	Rounds
Chevrolet	Allgaier Motorsports	16	Grant Enfinger	1
Chevrolet	Ferrier Racing	16	John Ferrier	1
Chevrolet	Bayird Motorsports	45	Peyton Taylor	1
Chevrolet	Brother-In-Law Racing	57	Bryan Dauzat	4
Chevrolet	Brother-In-Law Racing	57	Frankie Kimmel	1
Chevrolet	Chad Finley Racing	51	Chad Finley	6
Chevrolet	Ebert Racing	19	David Sear	1
Chevrolet	Finney Racing Enterprises	04	Scott Reeves	2
Chevrolet	Hixson Motorsports	31	Mike Senica	1
Chevrolet	Josh Williams Motorsports	31	Josh Williams	1
Chevrolet	MacZink Racing	65	Jeffery MacZink	1
Chevrolet	Mason Mitchell Motorsports	28	Michael Self (Note: It was a Mason Mitchell Motorsports entry using MDM Motorsports' owner points.)	2
Chevrolet	Mason Mitchell Motorsports	88	Kaz Grala	1
Chevrolet	Mason Mitchell Motorsports	88	Brandon Lynn	1
Chevrolet	Mason Mitchell Motorsports	88	Mason Mitchell	1
Chevrolet	Mason Mitchell Motorsports	88	Michael Womack	1
Chevrolet	Mason Mitchell Motorsports	88	Michael Self	1
Chevrolet	Mason Mitchell Motorsports	88	Chase Purdy	1
Chevrolet	Mason Mitchell Motorsports	98	Quin Houff	1
Chevrolet	Mason Mitchell Motorsports	98	Leilani Münter (Note: Entry was fielded in a collaboration with Venturini Motorsports.)	1
Chevrolet	Our Motorsports	02	Andy Seuss	3
Chevrolet	Reese Motorsports	62	Chris Reese	1
Chevrolet	Wayne Peterson Racing	88	Con Nicolopoulos (Note: It was a Wayne Peterson Racing entry using Mason Mitchell Motorsports' owner points.)	2
Chevrolet	Wayne Peterson Racing	88	Wayne Peterson	1
Chevrolet	Wayne Peterson Racing	90	James Swanson	1
Dodge	Derrick Lancaster Racing	83	Derrick Lancaster	1
Dodge	ESP Motorsports	71	Gene Paul	1
Ford	Ciccarelli Racing	38	Ray Ciccarelli	1
Ford	Clubb Racing	97	Alex Clubb	1
Ford	Cunningham Motorsports	99	Ty Majeski	5
Ford	Cunningham Motorsports	99	Austin Cindric	2
Ford	Empire Racing	43	Sean Corr	1
Ford	Empire Racing	46	Sean Corr	2
Ford	Empire Racing	46	Thad Moffitt	3
Ford	Empire Racing	46	John Ferrier	2
Ford	Kimmel Racing	08	Ricky Sanders	1
Ford	Kimmel Racing	08	Kevin Hinckle	3
Ford	Lira Motorsports	6	Michael Lira (Note: Entries were fielded in a collaboration with Josh Williams Motorsports.)	2
Ford	Lira Motorsports	58	Clint King	1
Ford	MBM Motorsports	66	Mark Thompson	2
Ford	Mullins Racing	28	Robert Bruce (Note: It was a Mullins Racing entry using MDM Motorsports' owner points.)	1
Ford	Mystic Motorsports	07	Dan Bainey	1
Ford	Mystic Motorsports	07	Brian Kaltreider	1
Ford	Mystic Motorsports	96	Bobby Dale Earnhardt	1
Ford	Mystic Motorsports	96	Kevin Kromer	1
Ford	Norm Hutton Racing	37	David LeBeau	2
Ford	Platinum Motorsports	01	Travis Braden	1
Toyota	Hendren Motorsports	24	Ryan Unzicker	2
Toyota	Joe Gibbs Racing	81	Riley Herbst (R)	1
Toyota	MDM Motorsports	12	Sheldon Creed	4
Toyota	Venturini Motorsports	20	Zane Smith (R)	2
Toyota	Venturini Motorsports	20	Tom Berte	1
Toyota	Rette Jones Racing	30	Terry Jones	1
Chevrolet	Brother-In-Law Racing 1 Hillenburg-Schrader Racing 2 Fast Track Racing 1	11	Bryan Dauzat (Note: It was a Brother-In-Law Racing entry using Fast Track Racing's owner points.)	1
Toyota	Brother-In-Law Racing 1 Hillenburg-Schrader Racing 2 Fast Track Racing 1	11	Tony Mrakovich	2
Toyota	Brother-In-Law Racing 1 Hillenburg-Schrader Racing 2 Fast Track Racing 1	11	Brandon Grosso	1
Chevrolet	Bob Schacht Motorsports	75	Benny Chastain	1
Toyota	Bob Schacht Motorsports	75	A. J. Henriksen	1
Chevrolet 8 Ford 1	Bobby Gerhart Racing	5	Bobby Gerhart	9
Dodge 2 Toyota 3	Crosley Sports Group	42	Bo LeMastus	5
Ford 4 Chevrolet 1	Shearer Racing 4 (Note: Entries were fielded in a collaboration with Darrell Basham Racing.); Karth Racing 1	94	Dale Shearer	3
Ford 4 Chevrolet 1	Shearer Racing 4 Karth Racing 1	94	Mark Meunier	1
Ford 4 Chevrolet 1	Shearer Racing 4 Karth Racing 1	94	Dick Karth (Note: It was a Karth Racing entry using Darrell Basham Racing's owner points.)	1
Dodge 1 Chevrolet 2	Dream Team of Pasco	67	Cody Lane	3
Chevrolet 2 Dodge 1 Ford 1	Finney Racing Enterprises	80	Caesar Bacarella	2
Chevrolet 2 Dodge 1 Ford 1	Finney Racing Enterprises	80	Brian Finney	2
Dodge 2 Chevrolet 6	Grant County Mulch Racing	7	Codie Rohrbaugh	8
Toyota 2 Chevrolet 3	MDM Motorsports	8	Vinnie Miller	1
Toyota 2 Chevrolet 3	MDM Motorsports	8	Brandon Jones	3
Toyota 2 Chevrolet 3	MDM Motorsports	8	Zane Smith (R)	1
Toyota 11 Chevrolet 3	MDM Motorsports	28	Michael Self	3
Toyota 11 Chevrolet 3	MDM Motorsports	28	Sheldon Creed	5
Toyota 11 Chevrolet 3	MDM Motorsports	28	Travis Miller	1
Toyota 11 Chevrolet 3	MDM Motorsports	28	Justin Haley	1
Toyota 11 Chevrolet 3	MDM Motorsports	28	Harrison Burton	1
Toyota 11 Chevrolet 3	MDM Motorsports	28	Kyle Benjamin	1
Toyota 11 Chevrolet 3	MDM Motorsports	28	Matt Tifft	1
Toyota 11 Chevrolet 3	MDM Motorsports	28	Zane Smith (R)	1
Toyota 8 Chevrolet 1	MDM Motorsports	41	Vinnie Miller	5
Toyota 8 Chevrolet 1	MDM Motorsports	41	Kaz Grala	1
Toyota 8 Chevrolet 1	MDM Motorsports	41	Brian Wong	1
Toyota 8 Chevrolet 1	MDM Motorsports	41	Kyle Benjamin	1
Toyota 8 Chevrolet 1	MDM Motorsports	41	Zane Smith (R)	1

=== Changes ===
==== Teams ====
- Joe Gibbs Racing returned in the ARCA series with Riley Herbst in the No. 18 Toyota Camry full-time. Herbst was ineligible to race at Daytona, which was raced instead by Matt Tifft

==== Drivers ====
- Zane Smith drove in 11 races for Venturini Motorsports in the No. 55 Toyota Camry. Smith was ineligible to race at Daytona and Talladega, which were raced instead by Noah Gragson.
- Gus Dean drove for Win-Tron Racing full-time in the No. 32 Toyota Camry. Dean drove for Mason Mitchell Motorsports in 5 races in and won at Talladega in his second start.
- Dalton Sargeant drove for Cunningham Motorsports full-time in the No. 77 Ford Fusion, replacing champion Chase Briscoe, who moved to Brad Keselowski Racing in the NASCAR Camping World Truck Series. Sargeant drove 15 races for Venturini Motorsports in the No. 55 and won the Berlin race in 2016.
- Quin Houff drove the No. 98 at Daytona for Mason Mitchell Motorsports in his ARCA debut.
- Shane Lee drove full-time for Cunningham Motorsports in 2017.

== Schedule ==
No.	Race title	Track	Date	TV
1	Lucas Oil Complete Engine Treatment 200	Daytona International Speedway, Daytona Beach	February 18	FS1
2	Music City 200	Nashville Fairgrounds Speedway, Nashville	April 8	MAVTV
3	Kentuckiana Ford Dealers 200	Salem Speedway, Salem	April 30	MAVTV
4	General Tire 200	Talladega Superspeedway, Lincoln	May 6	FS2
5	Menards 200	Toledo Speedway, Toledo	May 21	FS1
6	Shore Lunch 250	Elko Speedway, Elko	June 3	MAVTV
7	General Tire #AnywhereIsPossible 200	Pocono Raceway, Long Pond	June 9	FS1
8	Corrigan Oil 200	Michigan International Speedway, Brooklyn	June 16	FS1
9	Montgomery Ward 200	Madison International Speedway, Oregon	June 23	MAVTV
10	Fans With Benefits 150	Iowa Speedway, Newton	July 8	MAVTV
11	Sioux Chief PowerPEX 200	Lucas Oil Raceway, Brownsburg	July 21	FS1
12	ModSpace 150	Pocono Raceway, Long Pond	July 28	FS1
13	Winchester ARCA 200	Winchester Speedway, Winchester	August 6	MAVTV
14	Herr's Potato Chips 100	Illinois State Fairgrounds Racetrack, Springfield	August 20	MAVTV
15	Road America 100	Road America, Elkhart Lake	August 27	MAVTV
16	General Tire Grabber 100	DuQuoin State Fairgrounds Racetrack, Du Quoin	September 4	MAVTV
17	Eddie Gilstrap Motors Fall Classic 200	Salem Speedway, Salem	September 9	MAVTV
18	Scott 150	Chicagoland Speedway, Joliet	September 14	FS1
19	Crosley Brands 150	Kentucky Speedway, Sparta	September 22	FS1
20	Kansas 150	Kansas Speedway, Kansas City	October 20	FS2

== Results and standings ==
=== Races ===
No.	Race	Pole Position	Most laps led	Winning driver	Manufacturer	No.	Winning team
1	Lucas Oil Complete Engine Treatment 200	Tom Hessert III	Terry Jones	Austin Theriault	Chevrolet	52	Ken Schrader Racing
2	Music City 200	Kyle Weatherman	Kyle Weatherman	Chad Finley	Chevrolet	51	Chad Finley Racing
3	Kentuckiana Ford Dealers 200	Travis Miller	Christian Eckes	Dalton Sargeant	Ford	77	Cunningham Motorsports
4	General Tire 200	Dalton Sargeant	Austin Theriault	Justin Haley	Toyota	28	MDM Motorsports
5	Menards 200	Dalton Sargeant	Dalton Sargeant	Harrison Burton	Toyota	28	MDM Motorsports
6	Shore Lunch 250	Riley Herbst	Riley Herbst	Austin Theriault	Toyota	52	Ken Schrader Racing
7	General Tire#AnywhereIsPossible 200	Brandon Jones	Riley Herbst	Riley Herbst	Toyota	18	Joe Gibbs Racing
8	Corrigan Oil 200	Brandon Jones	Kyle Weatherman	Brandon Jones	Chevrolet	8	MDM Motorsports
9	Montgomery Ward 200	Dalton Sargeant	Austin Theriault	Austin Theriault	Toyota	52	Ken Schrader Racing
10	Fans With Benefits 150	Shane Lee	Shane Lee	Dalton Sargeant	Ford	77	Cunningham Motorsports
11	Sioux Chief PowerPEX 200	Austin Cindric	Chad Finley	Dalton Sargeant	Ford	77	Cunningham Motorsports
12	ModSpace 150	Kaz Grala	Kaz Grala	Justin Haley	Chevrolet	78	Mason Mitchell Motorsports
13	Winchester ARCA 200	Kyle Benjamin	Kyle Benjamin	Kyle Benjamin	Toyota	28	MDM Motorsports
14	Herr's Potato Chips 100	Austin Theriault	Grant Enfinger	Grant Enfinger	Chevrolet	16	Allgaier Motorsports
15	Road America 100	Austin Cindric	Austin Cindric	Austin Theriault	Ford	52	Ken Schrader Racing
16	General Tire Grabber 100	Will Kimmel	Shane Lee	Austin Theriault	Toyota	52	Ken Schrader Racing
17	Eddie Gilstrap Motors Fall Classic 200	Zane Smith	Austin Theriault	Austin Theriault	Ford	52	Ken Schrader Racing
18	Scott 150	Brandon Jones	Ty Majeski	Christopher Bell	Toyota	25	Venturini Motorsports
19	Crosley Brands 150	Sheldon Creed	Sheldon Creed	Austin Theriault	Ford	52	Ken Schrader Racing
20	Kansas 150	Zane Smith	Sheldon Creed	Michael Self	Chevrolet	28	MDM Motorsports

=== Drivers' championship ===
(key) Bold – Pole position awarded by time. Italics – Pole position set by final practice results or rainout. * – Most laps led.

Pos	Driver	DAY	NSH	SLM	TAL	TOL	ELK	POC	MCH	MAD	IOW	IRP	POC	WIN	ISF	ROA	DSF	SLM	CHI	KEN	KAN	Points
1	Austin Theriault	1	4	5	4*	6	1	9	2	1*	2	4	8	3	**2**	1	1	1*	2	1*	25	5330
2	Dalton Sargeant	4	9	1	**27**	**2***	8	6	3	**6**	1	1	5	16	10	8	8	3	6	4	5	5030
3	Shane Lee	3	12	4	5	22	7	28	15	4	**11***	9	13	6	5	4	6*	9	8	5	4	4735
4	Gus Dean	32	23	2	6	7	5	5	5	9	10	6	7	5	11	9	3	5	14	18	15	4595
5	Riley Herbst	Wth	7	12	8	5	**3***	1*	16	3	12	13	2	17	16	2	16	17	13	7	9	4555
6	Bret Holmes	6	13	7	22	24	4	14	4	7	9	8	14	8	20	10	12	7	10	21	10	4450
7	Thomas Praytor	29	28	14	12	14	15	24	19	13	18	17	22	14	13	19	11	16	30	14	20	3790
8	Brad Smith	17	21	17	17	17	17	31	20	16	17	24	24	19	17	24	21	21	26	26	22	3530
9	Zane Smith	Wth	10	6	Wth	4	6	4	23	2	13	7	3	15				**2**		2	**3**	3305
10	Eric Caudell	36	22	20	35	27	18	26	18	18	19	28	30	21	26	28	17	20	20	24	23	3220
11	Con Nicolopoulos	39	26	19	21	20	20	33	24	17	22	27	DNQ	20	25	22	DNS	18	27	20	DNQ	2985
12	A. J. Fike	34	15	15	11	16	9	18	13	12	15	15	20	12	8		22	8				2970
13	Mike Basham			16		15		23	27	14	16	16	25	13	15	20	15	13	18	23	18	2745
14	Justin Fontaine	13					11	21	26	11	23	22	26	9				11	15	10	14	2180
15	Sheldon Creed		6					8	17		3	5			4		2		31	**3**	19	2050
16	Christian Eckes		3	8*		8	2			5	8	10		2	6			19				1980
17	Mark Meunier			21		18	21		25	19	DNS	19		DNQ	19	23	20	22	25	27	26	1865
18	Bobby Gerhart	15	24		7	13		17				12	19	18		17						1360
19	Codie Rohrbaugh	14			14			12	8				11						29	16	8	1285
20	Spencer Davis				3			11	9		7	14								15	7	1280
21	Chad Finley		1			3			12			3*							5		11	1240
22	Bo LeMastus	25			10	12								11	22	13		12		25		1190
23	Natalie Decker					11	13	27					10			7				12	12	1150
24	Michael Self	27						3			4	2							17		1	1135
25	Nick Higdon		19			26		22	11		20		12						21	22		1100
26	Will Kimmel			18	33		22			20		26			9		**7**	10				1075
27	Kyle Weatherman	8	**2***	3	32			16	14*		5											1040
28	Vinnie Miller		25			9		10	10		6									13		1020
29	Ty Majeski							7	6										7	6	2	1005
30	Tom Hessert III	**5**			9										14		10	15				900
31	Travis Braden	22												4					11	9	17	845
32	Ed Pompa	30			24			19					16			26		14			24	845
33	Brandon Jones							2	**1**										**3**			695
34	Noah Gragson	26			30								9			25			4			685
35	Justin Haley				1								1								6	680
36	Kyle Benjamin								7					**1**					12			615
37	Bryan Dauzat	38			23								18						17		16	590
38	Mike Senica	23	29									20	29	DNQ					23			555
39	Chase Purdy													7				6		17		540
40	Tony Mrakovich		8	9				15														530
41	Willie Mullins	40	17		16		14															485
42	Sean Corr	11			15								17									475
43	Tyler Dippel					25									3		18					460
44	Andy Seuss	20			2														24			460
45	Thad Moffitt		16			23						11										440
46	Frankie Kimmel							13							24		13					440
47	Ricky Sanders	7			29											18						420
48	Kaz Grala	10											**4**									405
49	Bobby Dale Earnhardt					21	19	25														390
50	Mason Mingus		5	11																		385
51	Raphaël Lessard		33	13										10								370
52	John Ferrier	18						20					22									360
53	Tyler Speer														7		14					355
54	Joe Cooksey														12		9					355
55	Cole Rouse																			11	13	340
56	Ryan Unzicker														21		4					340
57	Rick Tackman								28	15						27						340
58	Matt Tifft	12														15						335
59	Kevin Hinckle										21	29									21	335
60	Dale Shearer		30									18			23							335
61	Zach Ralston										24	25							22			335
62	James Swanson						16							QL					28	28		330
63	Tanner Thorson									10							19					320
64	Tom Berte												15						16			305
65	Austin Cindric											**23**				12						305
66	Ray Ciccarelli	21			13																	290
67	Terry Jones	2*			36																	280
68	Steve Fox			22				DNS					21									270
69	Dick Doheny									21										19		260
70	Cody Lane	DNQ	27		19																	255
71	Grant Enfinger														1*							245
72	Christopher Bell																		1			240
73	Harrison Burton					1																240
74	Leilani Münter	19			28																	225
75	Don Thompson				20			32					DNQ									225
76	P. J. Jones															3						220
77	Josh Williams																	4				210
78	Brandon Grosso																5					205
79	Michael Womack															5						205
80	Austin Wayne Self															6						200
81	Brian Finney		11																			200
82	Michael Lira	37	18																			185
83	Ryan Repko									8												185
84	Clint King	9																				185
85	Blaine Perkins																			9		185
86	Travis Miller			10																		185
87	Scott Reeves		14																			185
88	Myatt Snider																		9			185
89	Cole Anderson						10															180
90	Tyler Roahrig					10																180
91	Cole Custer															11						175
92	Caesar Bacarella	33			25																	170
93	Robert Bruce						12															170
94	Mason Mitchell										14											160
95	Brian Wong															14						155
96	A. J. Henriksen															16						150
97	Derrick Lancaster	16																				150
98	Mark Thompson	31			31																	145
99	Brandon Lynn				18																	145
100	Alex Clubb														18							140
101	Austin Nemire					19																140
102	Rick Clifton		20																			130
103	Morgen Baird								21													125
104	Dick Karth															21						125
105	Trevor Noles											21										125
106	David Sear								22													120
107	David LeBeau	35			34																	115
108	Darrell Basham																	23				115
109	Brian Kaltreider												23									115
110	Peyton Taylor																23					115
111	Scott Edwards	24																				110
112	Ron Cox										25											105
113	Benny Chastain				26																	105
114	Dale Matchett							30					DNQ									105
115	Kevin Kromer												27									95
116	Quin Houff	28																				95
117	Dan Bainey							29														85
118	Wayne Peterson								29													85
119	Mark Blasingim		31																			75
120	Chris Reese		32																			70
	Richard Hauck																			DNS		25
	Gene Paul	DNQ																				25
	Jeffery MacZink								Wth													25

== See also ==
- 2017 Monster Energy NASCAR Cup Series
- 2017 NASCAR Xfinity Series
- 2017 NASCAR Camping World Truck Series
- 2017 NASCAR K&N Pro Series East
- 2017 NASCAR K&N Pro Series West
- 2017 NASCAR Whelen Modified Tour
- 2017 NASCAR Pinty's Series
- 2017 NASCAR PEAK Mexico Series
- 2017 NASCAR Whelen Euro Series
