= Rick Tackman =

American racing driver

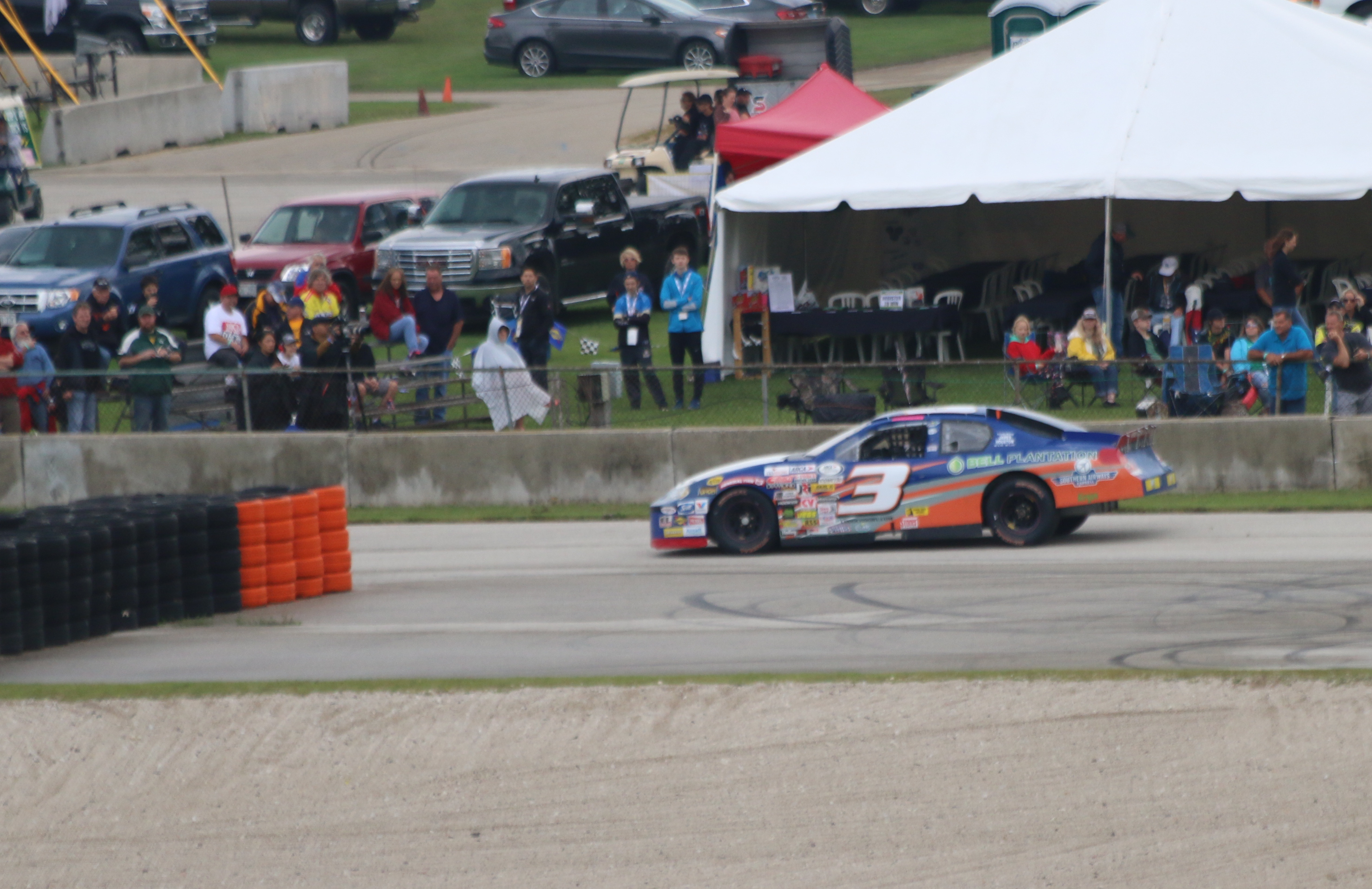
- Tackman's No. 3 car at Road America in 2017
- Born: November 11, 1975 (age 50); Waukesha, Wisconsin, U.S.

ARCA Menards Series career
- 12 races run over 8 years
- Best finish: 57th (2017)
- First race: 2000 Par-A-Dice 100 (Springfield)
- Last race: 2017 Road America 100 (Road America)
Wins	Top tens	Poles
0	1	0
- Statistics up to date as of December 2, 2024.

Rick Tackman Jr. (born November 11, 1975) is an American professional stock car racing driver who has competed in the ARCA Racing Series from 2000 to 2017. He is the father of fellow racing driver Rick Redig-Tackman, who has also competed in what is now known as the ARCA Menards Series.

Tackman has also previously competed in the Mid-American Stock Car Series, the CRA Late Model Sportsman Series, the Midwest Truck Series, and the Midwest Modifieds Tour.

== Motorsports results ==
=== ARCA Racing Series ===
(key) (Bold – Pole position awarded by qualifying time. Italics – Pole position earned by points standings or practice time. * – Most laps led. ** – All laps led.)

ARCA Racing Series results
Year	Team	No.	Make	1	2	3	4	5	6	7	8	9	10	11	12	13	14	15	16	17	18	19	20	21	22	23	24	25	ARSC	Pts	Ref
2000	N/A	75	Ford	DAY	SLM	AND	CLT	KIL; DNQ	FRS; DNQ	MCH	POC	TOL	KEN	BLN	POC	WIN	ISF; 36	KEN	DSF										98th	175	
2000	N/A	68	Ford																	SLM; 26	CLT	TAL	ATL						98th	175	
2001	Rick Tackman	75	Chevy	DAY	NSH	WIN	SLM	GTY	KEN	CLT	KAN	MCH	POC	MEM	GLN	KEN	MCH	POC	NSH	ISF; DNQ	CHI	DSF	SLM	TOL					N/A	0	
2001	Rick Tackman	68	Chevy																						BLN; DNQ	CLT	TAL	ATL	N/A	0	
2004	Rick Tackman	75	Ford	DAY	NSH	SLM; 24	KEN	TOL	CLT	KAN	POC	MCH	SBO	BLN	KEN	GTW	POC	LER	NSH										65th	425	
2004	Bob Schacht Motorsports	75	Ford																	ISF; 9	TOL	DSF; 32	CHI						65th	425	
2004	Fast Track Racing Enterprises	10	Ford																					SLM; 34	TAL				65th	425	
2005	Bob Schacht Motorsports	75	Ford	DAY	NSH	SLM	KEN	TOL	LAN	MIL; 41	POC	MCH	KAN	KEN	BLN	POC	GTW	LER	NSH	MCH	ISF	TOL	DSF	CHI	SLM	TAL			N/A	0	
2006	Bob Schacht Motorsports	75	Ford	DAY	NSH	SLM	WIN	KEN	TOL	POC	MCH	KAN	KEN	BLN	POC	GTW	NSH	MCH	ISF	MIL; DNQ	TOL	DSF	CHI	SLM	TAL	IOW			N/A	0	
2007	Rick Tackman	21	Ford	DAY	USA	NSH	SLM	KAN	WIN	KEN	TOL	IOW	POC	MCH	BLN	KEN	POC	NSH	ISF	MIL; 30	GTW	DSF	CHI	SLM	TAL	TOL			161st	80	
2016	Hixson Motorsports	2	Chevy	DAY	NSH	SLM	TAL	TOL	NJE	POC	MCH	MAD; 12	WIN	IOW	IRP	POC	BLN	ISF	DSF	SLM									81st	255	
2016	Fast Track Racing	1	Ford																		CHI; 29	KEN	KAN						81st	255	
2017	Hixson Motorsports	3	Chevy	DAY	NSH	SLM	TAL	TOL	ELK	POC	MCH; 28	MAD; 15	IOW	IRP	POC	WIN	ISF	ROA; 27	DSF	SLM	CHI	KEN	KAN						57th	340	
