= Dalton Sargeant =

American racing driver (born 1998)

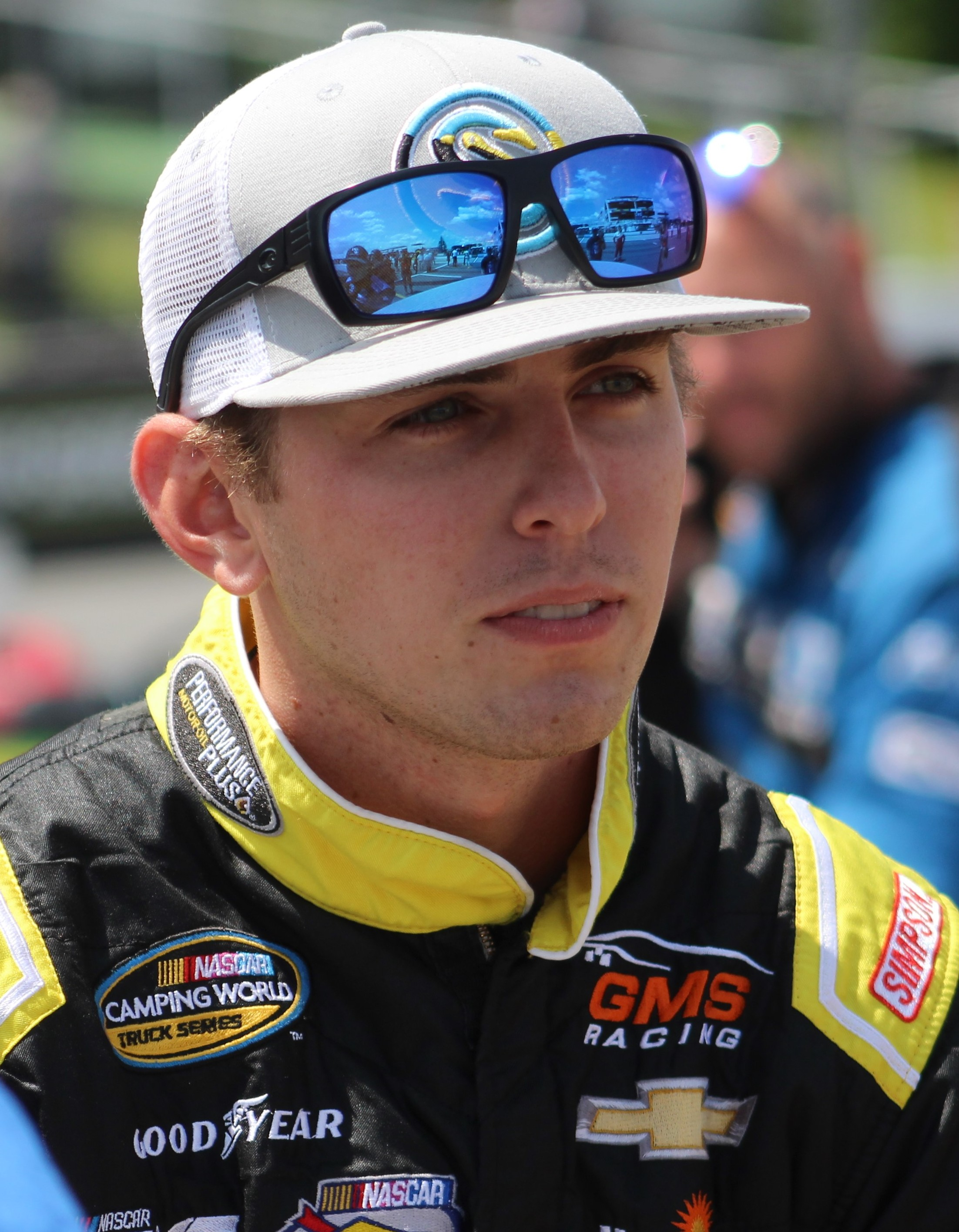
- Sargeant at Pocono Raceway in 2018
- Born: Daniel Dalton Sargeant; March 25, 1998 (age 28); Boca Raton, Florida, U.S.
- Awards: 2016 ARCA Racing Series Rookie of the Year

NASCAR FedEx Freight Truck Series career
- 22 races run over 3 years
- 2018 position: 14th
- Best finish: 14th (2018)
- First race: 2015 UNOH 200 (Bristol)
- Last race: 2018 UNOH 200 (Bristol)
Wins	Top tens	Poles
0	6	0
- Statistics up to date as of October 8, 2023.

Daniel Dalton Sargeant (born March 25, 1998) is an American former professional stock car racing driver. He last competed full-time in the NASCAR Craftsman Truck Series, driving the No. 25 Chevrolet Silverado for GMS Racing. He was the 2016 ARCA Racing Series Rookie of the Year, and finished second in the ARCA point standings in 2017. He is the older brother of former Williams Formula One driver and current IMSA driver Logan Sargeant.

== Racing career ==
=== Early years ===
Sargeant began his career at age nine, racing karts as well as bandoleros, with dreams of pursuing both a stock car and open wheel career. In 2012 at the age of 13, Sargeant and his brother moved to Switzerland to compete in European open wheel series. He scored wins in the WSK Euro Series and the CIK-FIA European KF3 Championship, and tested a Formula Renault car.

After returning to the United States in 2014, Sargeant competed in late models for Lee Pulliam Performance and Wauters Motorsports, scoring several victories including one at Orange County Speedway. In 2014, he scored a victory in the IMSA Cooper Tires Prototype Lites series at Sebring International Raceway.

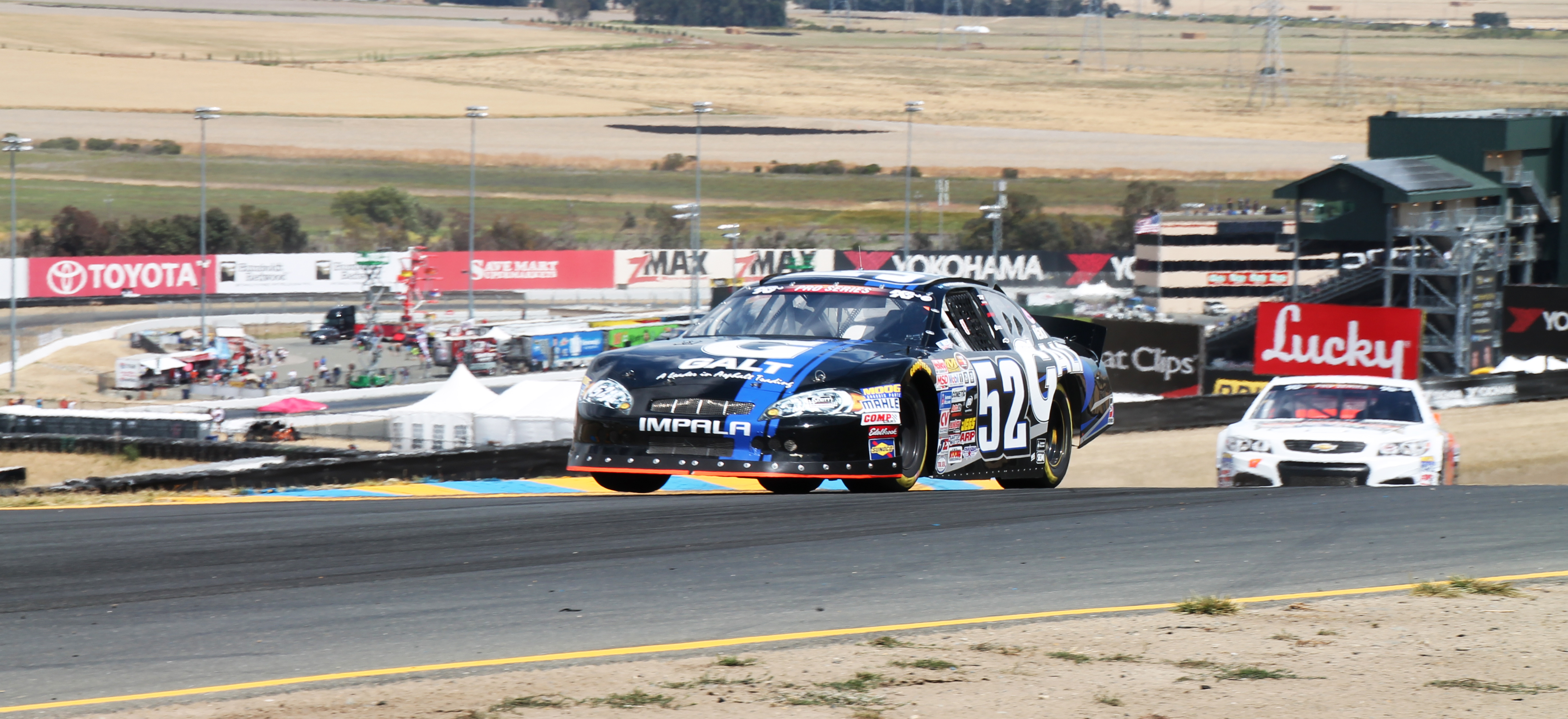
Sargeant racing in the 2015 Carneros 200

Sargeant finished second in the Snowball Derby in December 2014, placing runner up to John Hunter Nemechek. In January 2015, Sargeant planned to compete in the 24 Hours of Daytona in the TUDOR United SportsCar Championship, but was declined his competition license by race organizers due to his age and inexperience with sports cars. The race requires that all drivers are 17 years old, while Sargeant was 16 at the time, though exceptions had been made in the past.

=== Developmental series ===
For 2015, Sargeant signed with HScott Motorsports to drive the No. 51 Chevrolet SS in the NASCAR K&N Pro Series East, with sponsorship from GALT. He debuted in the series in February 2015 at New Smyrna Speedway with a second-place finish. Sargeant also ran part-time in the K&N Pro Series West, where he scored a victory in the season's first race. In May, Sargeant was named to the 2015 NASCAR Next class. On August 12, 2015, Sargeant announced he would make his Camping World Truck Series debut at the UNOH 200 at Bristol Motor Speedway for Wauters Motorsports.

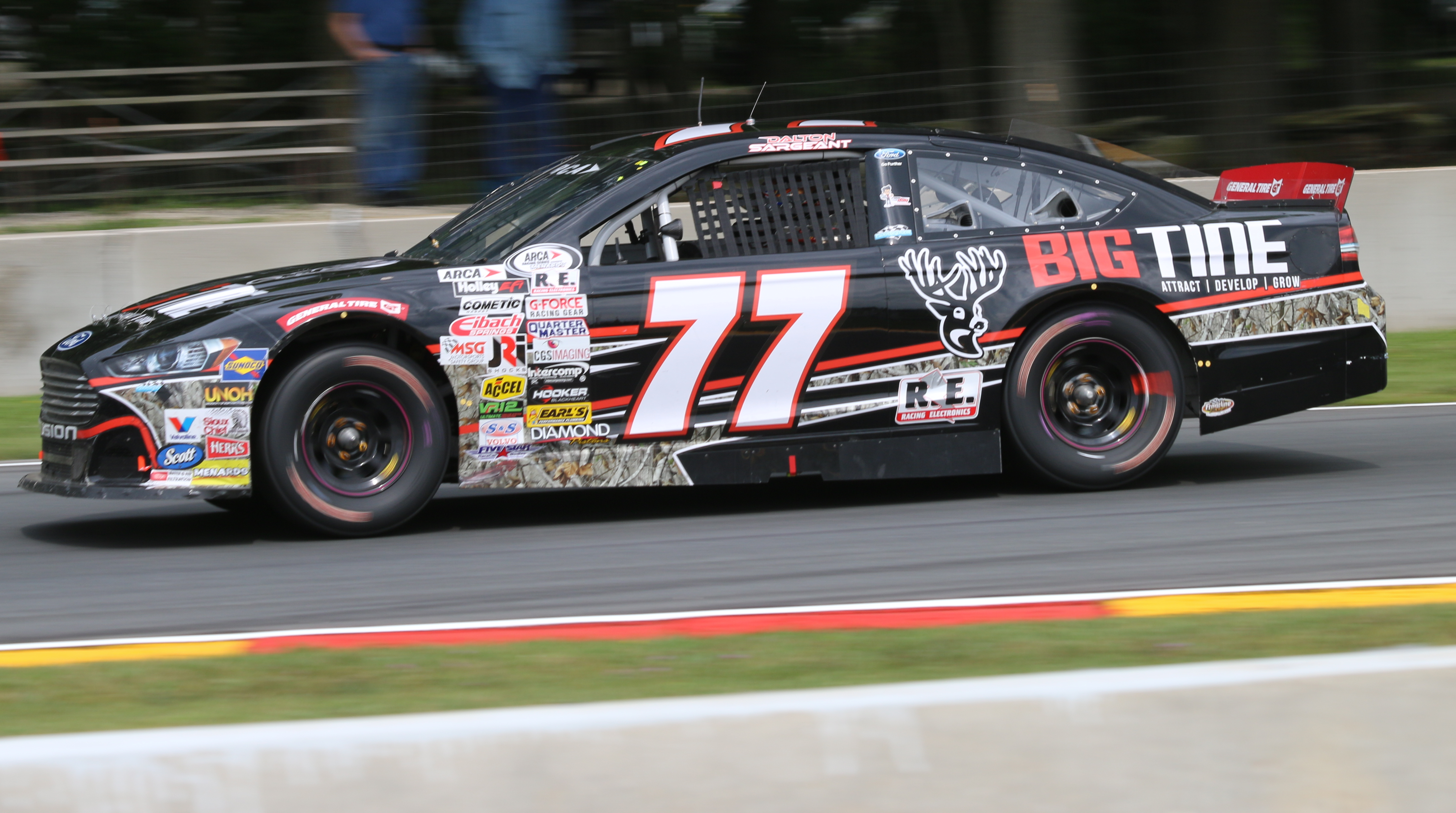
Sargeant's 2017 ARCA car at Road America

Sargeant competed in the ARCA Racing Series during the 2016 season. He ran 15 races for Venturini Motorsports with one win, ten top five and twelve top ten finishes. He was named the 2016 ARCA Rookie of the Year.

He signed with Cunningham Motorsports to run the entire 2017 ARCA Racing Series schedule alongside Shane Lee. In the third race of the season, he lapped the field en route to victory at Salem Speedway. He also won at Iowa Speedway and beat Michael Self en route to victory at Lucas Oil Raceway at Indianapolis. Sargeant finished outside of the top ten only twice and finished second in the championship standings to Ken Schrader Racing driver Austin Theriault.

=== National series ===
After sporadic appearances in the NASCAR Camping World Truck Series in 2015 and 2017, Sargeant signed with GMS Racing to drive the team's No. 25 truck for a full 2018 season on January 12, 2018. He chose the No. 25 as a tribute to Tim Richmond. Sargeant was approached by Maurice J. Gallagher Jr., owner of GMS, midway through 2017 after winning races in the 2017 ARCA Racing Series season with Cunningham Motorsports. On August 22, 2018, it was announced that he left the team and would be replaced by Spencer Gallagher starting at Mosport (then later on Timothy Peters after Gallagher aggravated his shoulder during a workout) due to "unfortunate circumstances" regarding Sargeant Motorsports.

== Personal life ==
Sargeant was born in Boca Raton, Florida. He is the older brother of Logan Sargeant, who competed in Formula One and now races in IMSA for PR1/Mathiasen Motorsports.

== Motorsports career results ==
=== Racing career summary ===
Season	Series	Team	Races	Wins	Top 5	Top 10	Points	Position
2015	NASCAR K&N Pro Series West	Jefferson Pitts Racing	2	1	2	2	173	17th
2015	NASCAR K&N Pro Series West	HScott Motorsports with Justin Marks	4	0	2	2	173	17th
2015	NASCAR K&N Pro Series East	HScott Motorsports with Justin Marks	14	0	6	9	506	4th
2015	NASCAR Camping World Truck Series	Wauters Motorsports	4	0	0	2	110	35th
2016	CARS Super Late Model Tour	Bond Suss Racing	4	0	3	3	100	17th
2016	ARCA Racing Series	Venturini Motorsports	15	1	10	12	3040	8th
2017	ARCA Racing Series	Cunningham Motorsports	20	3	10	18	5030	**2nd**
2017	NASCAR Camping World Truck Series	MDM Motorsports	2	0	0	0	37	50th
2018	NASCAR Camping World Truck Series	GMS Racing	16	0	1	4	404	14th

=== NASCAR ===
(key) (Bold – Pole position awarded by qualifying time. Italics – Pole position earned by points standings or practice time. * – Most laps led.)

==== Camping World Truck Series ====
NASCAR Camping World Truck Series results
Year	Team	No.	Make	1	2	3	4	5	6	7	8	9	10	11	12	13	14	15	16	17	18	19	20	21	22	23	NCWTC	Pts	Ref
2015	Wauters Motorsports	5	Toyota	DAY	ATL	MAR	KAN	CLT	DOV	TEX	GTW	IOW	KEN	ELD	POC	MCH	BRI; 10	MSP	CHI	NHA; 9	LVS	TAL	MAR; 28	TEX	PHO; 19	HOM	35th	110	
2017	MDM Motorsports	99	Chevy	DAY	ATL	MAR	KAN	CLT	DOV	TEX	GTW	IOW	KEN	ELD	POC	MCH	BRI	MSP	CHI	NHA	LVS	TAL	MAR	TEX	PHO; 17	HOM; 20	50th	37	
2018	GMS Racing	25	Chevy	DAY; 8	ATL; 14	LVS; 6	MAR; 11	DOV; 13	KAN; 11	CLT; 19	TEX; 11	IOW; 19	GTW; 30	CHI; 20	KEN; 9	ELD; 27	POC; 3	MCH; 12	BRI; 11	MSP	LVS	TAL	MAR	TEX	PHO	HOM	14th	404	

==== K&N Pro Series East ====
NASCAR K&N Pro Series East results
Year	Team	No.	Make	1	2	3	4	5	6	7	8	9	10	11	12	13	14	NKNPSEC	Pts	Ref
2015	HScott Motorsports with Justin Marks	51	Chevy	NSM; 2	GRE; 3	BRI; 26	IOW; 14	BGS; 2	LGY; 3	COL; 6	NHA; 12	IOW; 9	GLN; 2	MOT; 11	VIR; 9	RCH; 3	DOV; 11	4th	506	

==== K&N Pro Series West ====
NASCAR K&N Pro Series West results
Year	Team	No.	Make	1	2	3	4	5	6	7	8	9	10	11	12	13	NKNPSWC	Pts	Ref
2015	Jefferson Pitts Racing	55	Chevy	KCR; 1	IRW; 3	TUS											17th	173	
2015	HScott Motorsports with Justin Marks	52	Chevy				IOW; 23 (Note: Race was held as a combined event, with competitors from the K&N Pro Series West competing along with competitors for the K&N Pro Series East. The race was run with a series-based point distribution, where drivers received points and statistical credit for their finish relative to other drivers in their series, not to the whole field in general.)	SHA	SON; 2	SLS	IOW; 13	EVG	CNS	MER	AAS	PHO; 4	17th	173	

^{*} Season still in progress
^{1} Ineligible for series points

=== ARCA Racing Series ===
(key) (Bold – Pole position awarded by qualifying time. Italics – Pole position earned by points standings or practice time. * – Most laps led.)

ARCA Racing Series results
Year	Team	No.	Make	1	2	3	4	5	6	7	8	9	10	11	12	13	14	15	16	17	18	19	20	ARSC	Pts	Ref
2016	Venturini Motorsports	55	Toyota	DAY	NSH	SLM; 3	TAL; 7	TOL; 2	NJE; 3	POC; 4	MCH; 9	MAD	WIN; 2	IOW; 4	IRP; 20	POC; 3	BLN; 1	ISF	DSF	SLM; 12	CHI; 5	KEN; 2	KAN; 12	8th	3040	
2017	Cunningham Motorsports	77	Ford	DAY; 4	NSH; 9	SLM; 1	**TAL**; 27	**TOL**; 2*	ELK; 8	POC; 6	MCH; 3	**MAD**; 6	IOW; 1	IRP; 1	POC; 5	WIN; 16	ISF; 10	ROA; 8	DSF; 8	SLM; 3	CHI; 6	KEN; 4	KAN; 5	2nd	5030	

=== CARS Super Late Model Tour ===
(key)

CARS Super Late Model Tour results
Year	Team	No.	Make	1	2	3	4	5	6	7	8	9	10	CSLMTC	Pts	Ref
2016	Bond Suss Racing	55	Toyota	SNM; 24	ROU; 3	HCY	TCM	GRE	ROU; 2	CON	MYB; 3	HCY	SNM	17th	100	
