= Frankie Kimmel =

American stock car driver (born 1990)

- Born: August 26, 1990 (age 36) Borden, Indiana, U.S.

ARCA Menards Series career
- Debut season: 2011
- Starts: 11
- Championships: 0
- Wins: 0
- Podiums: 0
- Poles: 0
- Best finish: 45th in 2017
- Statistics up to date as of October 18, 2022.

Frank Kimmel II (born August 26, 1990) is an American professional stock car racing spotter and former driver. He is the son of ten-time ARCA Menards Series champion Frank Kimmel, and the cousin of current ARCA driver Will Kimmel. He is currently the spotter of the No. 7 Chevrolet Camaro ZL1 driven by Daniel Suárez for Spire Motorsports.

== Racing career ==
Kimmel first started racing at the age of eight, driving mini cup cars. He also raced frequently at Salem Speedway, winning the rookie of the year titles in the street-stock division in 2007 before winning the championship in the division in 2008. Kimmel would later move up to super-stock division and won the championship in the category in 2009.

Kimmel would make his ARCA Racing Series debut in 2010 driving for Wayne Hixson at Salem Speedway, finishing 29th after running only ten laps due to a rear end failure. He would return to the series a year later, driving three races, including both Salem events, and achieved his first top-ten finish in the latter Salem race, finishing seventh. He would make infrequent starts in the series for the next few years after that (including separate starts for Venturini Motorsports), earning two more top-ten finishes, with his last start coming in 2017.

== Spotting career ==
Kimmel first began serving as a spotter for various drivers whenever they needed a spotter, but his first major foray would come when he was spotting for his father Frank at the ARCA race at Berlin Raceway where the elder Kimmel would finish third in the race. He would later serve as a spotter for Christian Eckes in the inaugural CARS Tour race at Southern National Motorsports Park.

In 2022, Kimmel would join Trackhouse Racing Team and serve as the spotter for Daniel Suárez, who would win the 2022 Toyota/Save Mart 350 at Sonoma Raceway that year.

As of 2026, Kimmel joined Daniel Suarez in his move to Spire Motorsports as his spotter for the 2026 NASCAR Cup Series season.

== Personal life ==
Kimmel attended and graduated from University of North Carolina–Charlotte in 2015 with an engineering degree.

== Motorsports career results ==
=== ARCA Racing Series ===
(key) (Bold – Pole position awarded by qualifying time. Italics – Pole position earned by points standings or practice time. * – Most laps led.)

ARCA Racing Series results
Year	Team	No.	Make	1	2	3	4	5	6	7	8	9	10	11	12	13	14	15	16	17	18	19	20	ARSC	Pts	Ref
2010	Hixson Motorsports	28	Chevy	DAY	PBE	SLM; 29	TEX	TAL	TOL	POC	MCH	IOW	MFD	POC	BLN	NJE	ISF	CHI	DSF	TOL	SLM	KAN	CAR	122nd	85	
2011	Kimmel Racing	4	Ford	DAY	TAL	SLM; 27	TOL																	59th	380	
2011	Cunningham Motorsports	77	Dodge					NJE; 29	CHI	POC	MCH	WIN	BLN	IOW	IRP	POC	ISF	MAD	DSF	SLM; 7	KAN	TOL		59th	380	
2012	Team BCR Racing	09	Ford	DAY	MOB	SLM	TAL	TOL	ELK	POC	MCH	WIN	NJE	IOW	CHI	IRP	POC	BLN	ISF	MAD	SLM; 7	DSF	KAN	91st	200	
2014	Venturini Motorsports	66	Toyota	DAY	MOB	SLM; 25	TAL	TOL	NJE	POC	MCH	ELK	WIN	CHI	IRP	POC	BLN	ISF	MAD	DSF	SLM	KEN	KAN	125th	105	
2015	Venturini Motorsports	15	Toyota	DAY	MOB	NSH	SLM; 24	TAL	TOL	NJE	POC	MCH	CHI	WIN	IOW	IRP	POC	BLN	ISF	DSF				77th	295	
2015	Venturini Motorsports	55	Toyota																		SLM; 10	KEN	KAN	77th	295	
2017	Brother-In-Law Racing	57	Chevy	DAY	NSH	SLM	TAL	TOL	ELK	POC; 13	MCH	MAD	IOW	IRP	POC	WIN								45th	440	
2017	Venturini Motorsports	55	Toyota														ISF; 24	ROA	DSF; 13	SLM	CHI	KEN	KAN	45th	440	
