= Mark Meunier =

American racing driver

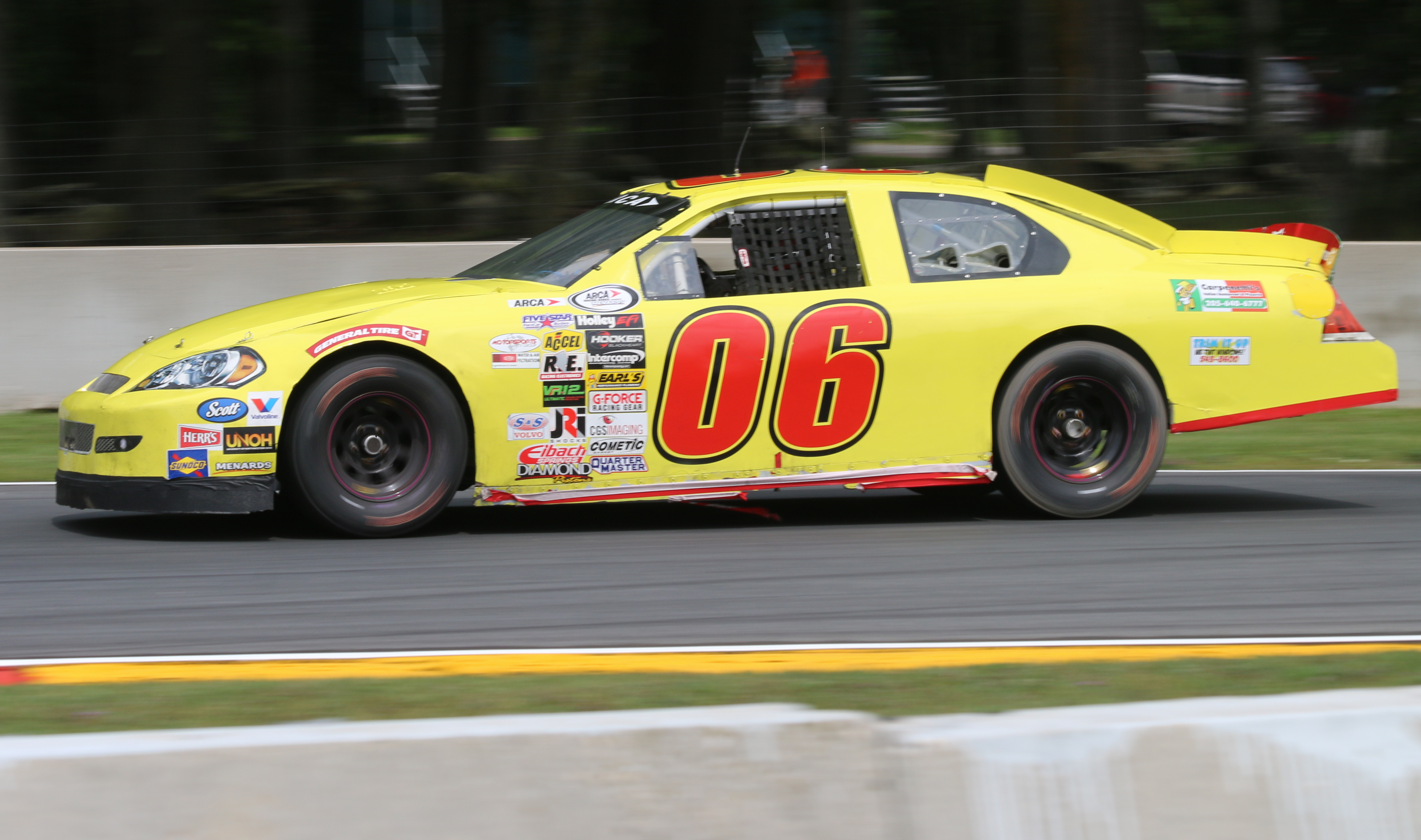
- Meunier's No. 06 ARCA car at Road America in 2017
- Born: June 5, 1964 (age 62); Louisville, Kentucky, U.S.

ARCA Menards Series career
- 39 races run over 6 years
- Best finish: 17th (2017)
- First race: 2013 Kentuckiana Ford Dealers 200 (Salem)
- Last race: 2018 Scott 150 (Chicagoland)
Wins	Top tens	Poles
0	0	0

Mark Meunier (born June 5, 1964) is an American professional stock car racing driver who has previously competed in the ARCA Racing Series.

== Racing career ==
In 2013, Meunier made his debut in the ARCA Racing Series at Salem Speedway, driving the No. 70 Dodge for Carter 2 Motorsports, where he started 24th and finished in 23rd due to a crash. He then made three more starts with the team that year, this time in the No. 40, where he got a best finish of sixteenth at Elko Speedway. Meunier then made four more starts the following year, spitting time between Kimmel Racing and C2M, getting a best finish of eighteenth at the season ending race at Kansas Speedway.

In 2015, Meunier ran half of the schedule, this time solely driving for Kimmel Racing, where he was running at the end in one race, that coming a Kentucky Speedway, where he finished in eighteenth. He then made only three starts the following year, running for Kimmel at Berlin Raceway, where he finished 21st due to brake issues, and two for Wayne Peterson Racing, finishing 27th at Kentucky due to brake issues, and 33rd at Kansas due to vibrations in the car.

In 2017, Meunier ran thirteen races, with a majority of the starts he made that year coming with Wayne Peterson Racing. He finished only four of those races, getting a best finish of eighteenth at Toledo Speedway. He then made only four more starts for Peterson the following year, getting a best result of 22nd at Gateway Motorsports Park.

In 2019, it was revealed that Meunier would attempt to make his debut in the NASCAR Xfinity Series at Iowa Speedway, driving the No. 17 Chevrolet for Rick Ware Racing in collaboration with Mike Harmon Racing. After failing to set a time in the first practice session, and setting the slowest time in the second session, he ultimately failed to qualify for the race after suffering a crash in qualifying. This was his most recent attempt as a driver, as he has not raced since then.

== Personal life ==
Meunier worked as an employee for the Richard Petty Driving Experience from 2013 to 2017, and is the owner of Advantage Roofing and Construction, LLC.

== Motorsports results ==
=== NASCAR ===
(key) (Bold – Pole position awarded by qualifying time. Italics – Pole position earned by points standings or practice time. * – Most laps led.)

==== Xfinity Series ====
NASCAR Xfinity Series results
Year	Team	No.	Make	1	2	3	4	5	6	7	8	9	10	11	12	13	14	15	16	17	18	19	20	21	22	23	24	25	26	27	28	29	30	31	32	33	NXSC	Pts	Ref
2019	Rick Ware Racing	17	Chevy	DAY	ATL	LVS	PHO	CAL	TEX	BRI	RCH	TAL	DOV	CLT	POC	MCH	IOW	CHI	DAY	KEN	NHA	IOW; DNQ	GLN	MOH	BRI	ROA	DAR	IND	LVS	RCH	CLT	DOV	KAN	TEX	PHO	HOM	N/A	0	

=== ARCA Racing Series ===
(key) (Bold – Pole position awarded by qualifying time. Italics – Pole position earned by points standings or practice time. * – Most laps led.)

ARCA Racing Series results
Year	Team	No.	Make	1	2	3	4	5	6	7	8	9	10	11	12	13	14	15	16	17	18	19	20	21	ARSC	Pts	Ref
2013	Carter 2 Motorsports	70	Dodge	DAY	MOB	SLM; 23	TAL	TOL																	32nd	860	
2013	Carter 2 Motorsports	40	Dodge						ELK; 16	POC	MCH	ROA	WIN	CHI	NJM	POC	BLN	ISF	MAD	DSF	IOW	SLM; 24	KEN; 24	KAN; 21	32nd	860	
2014	Kimmel Racing	69	Ford	DAY	MOB; 25	SLM; 22	TAL; DNQ	TOL	NJE	POC	MCH	ELK	WIN	CHI	IRP	POC	BLN	ISF	MAD	DSF	SLM				41st	460	
2014	Carter 2 Motorsports	40	Dodge																			KEN; 32			41st	460	
2014	Carter 2 Motorsports	97	Dodge																				KAN; 18		41st	460	
2015	Kimmel Racing	68	Ford	DAY	MOB	NSH	SLM; 25	TAL	TOL	NJE	POC	MCH	CHI; 28	WIN; 23	IOW; 27			BLN; 26	ISF; 30	DSF; 30	SLM; 32	KEN; 18	KAN		29th	945	
2015	Kimmel Racing	67	Ford													IRP; 32	POC								29th	945	
2016	Kimmel Racing	69	Ford	DAY	NSH	SLM	TAL	TOL	NJE	POC	MCH	MAD	WIN	IOW	IRP	POC	BLN; 21	ISF	DSF	SLM	CHI				77th	285	
2016	Wayne Peterson Racing	00	Chevy																			KEN; 27			77th	285	
2016	Wayne Peterson Racing	06	Chevy																				KAN; 33		77th	285	
2017	Wayne Peterson Racing	06	Chevy	DAY	NSH	SLM; 21	TAL	TOL; 18	ELK; 21	POC	MCH; 25	MAD; 19		IRP; 19	POC	WIN; DNQ	ISF; 19	ROA; 23					KAN; 26		17th	1865	
2017	Wayne Peterson Racing	0	Dodge										IOW; 26												17th	1865	
2017	Wayne Peterson Racing	06	Ford																DSF; 20						17th	1865	
2017	Wayne Peterson Racing	0	Ford																	SLM; 22		KEN; 27			17th	1865	
2017	Dale Shearer Racing	94	Ford																		CHI; 25				17th	1865	
2018	Wayne Peterson Racing	0	Chevy	DAY	NSH	SLM; 24	TAL	TOL	CLT	POC	MCH; 25	MAD													64th	310	
2018	Wayne Peterson Racing	0	Dodge										GTW; 22	CHI; 26	IOW	ELK	POC	ISF	BLN	DSF	SLM	IRP	KAN		64th	310	
