= Cole Anderson =

American racing driver (born 1997)

- Born: December 16, 1997 (age 28); Northfield, Minnesota, U.S.

ARCA Menards Series career
- 1 race run over 1 year
- Best finish: 89th (2017)
- First race: 2017 Shore Lunch 250 (Elko)
Wins	Top tens	Poles
0	1	0
- Statistics up to date as of February 7, 2025.

Cole Anderson (born December 16, 1997) is an American professional stock car racing driver who has previously competed in the ARCA Racing Series and the CARS Super Late Model Tour.

Anderson has previously competed in series such as the ASA CRA Super Series, the ASA Southern Super Series, the TUNDRA Super Late Model Series, and the Big 8 Late Model Series.

== Motorsports results ==
=== ARCA Racing Series ===
(key) (Bold – Pole position awarded by qualifying time. Italics – Pole position earned by points standings or practice time. * – Most laps led.)

ARCA Racing Series results
Year	Team	No.	Make	1	2	3	4	5	6	7	8	9	10	11	12	13	14	15	16	17	18	19	20	ARSC	Pts	Ref
2017	Mason Mitchell Motorsports	78	Chevy	DAY	NSH	SLM	TAL	TOL	ELK; 10	POC	MCH	MAD	IOW	IRP	POC	WIN	ISF	ROA	DSF	SLM	CHI	KEN	KAN	89th	180	

=== CARS Super Late Model Tour ===
(key)

CARS Super Late Model Tour results
Year	Team	No.	Make	1	2	3	4	5	6	7	8	9	10	11	12	13	CSLMTC	Pts	Ref
2017	N/A	6A	Toyota	CON	DOM	DOM	HCY	HCY	BRI; 27	AND	ROU	TCM	ROU	HCY	CON	SBO	N/A	0	
2018	CDM Inc.	97	Chevy	MYB	NSH	ROU	HCY	BRI	AND; 29	HCY	ROU	SBO					N/A	0	
