= Ron Cox (racing driver) =

American racing driver

- Born: Ron Cox; July 12, 1966 (age 60); Soddy Daisy, Tennessee, U.S.
- Awards: 1999 ARCA Bondo/Mar-Hyde Series Rookie of the Year

ARCA Menards Series career
- 165 races run over 23 years
- Best finish: 4th (2001)
- First race: 1987 Allen Crowe 100 (Springfield)
- Last race: 2017 Fans With Benefits 150 (Iowa)
Wins	Top tens	Poles
0	34	0
- Statistics up to date as of June 10, 2023.

Ron Cox (born July 12, 1966) is an American semi-retired professional stock car racing driver who competed in the ARCA Racing Series for twenty-three years, mainly driving for Hixson Motorsports.

== Racing career ==
Cox made his first attempt in the ARCA Permatex SuperCar Series in 1984 at the age of seventeen, failing to qualifying for the event at the Springfield dirt track. He would not return to the series until 1987, where he attempted three races and failed to qualify for two. In 1988, Cox only attempted Springfield again, but would fail to qualify. After three more years without making a start in the series, he would return in 1991 for the Talladega race in a No. 46 Chevrolet, where he would finish 26th. After another four years without making a start, he would make five starts through 1996 to 1998.

In 1999, Cox ran the full schedule in the now ARCA Bondo/Mar-Hyde Series for Hixson Motorsports in the No. 23 Chevrolet, where he would get four top-ten finishes with a best finish of seventh at the DuQuoin State Fairgrounds dirt track. He would finish eighth in the point despite failing to qualify for the season opening race at Daytona International Speedway on route to winning rookie of the year honors. In 2000, he would drop to eleventh in the standings, although he would get his first top-five finish at Kentucky Speedway with a fifth-place finish. In 2001, Cox would run the full schedule again, this time finishing fourth in the points with six top-ten finishes with a best finish of seventh at Winchester Speedway, Salem Speedway, and Berlin Raceway. For the following year, he would spend a majority in the year in the No. 23 for Hixson, while running four races in the No. 50 on his way to finishing ninth in the points that year. At the season ending event at Lowe's Motor Speedway, he would be withdrawn from the event after the death of teammate Eric Martin from a crash involving Deborah Renshaw during a practice session.

Cox finished ninth in the points again in 2003, with seven top-tens and two top-fives with a best result of third at Berlin. His season was also notable due to being involved in a crash with Kyle Busch at the second Pocono Raceway event, where he would turn Busch into the inside wall heading into the first corner shortly after a restart late in the race. Cox would go on the finish 21st in the race, while Busch would be classified in 25th position. Cox would only run the first five races of 2004, earning a best result of sixth at Salem. He would run only six races in 2005, and would only run nine total races from 2006 to 2008, with a best result of ninth at Springfield in 2007 whilst driving for Bobby Gerhart Racing in the No. 5 Pontiac.

In 2009, Cox ran six races for Hixson, first driving the No. 57 Chevrolet for two races, although he was originally scheduled to drive the No. 23 at Salem, and then driving the No. 28 for his remaining races. At the event at Springfield, he would lead eleven laps on his way to finish second behind race winner Parker Kligerman. He would run five more races in 2010, getting a best result of tenth at Salem. In 2011, he would run fourteen of the nineteen races on the schedule, mainly driving the No. 28 for Hixson, although he would run one race in the No. 29 at Iowa Speedway. He would finish seventeenth in the final standings.

After making two starts in the series in both 2012 and 2014, Cox returned in 2017 at Iowa Speedway, driving the No. 3 Chevrolet for Hixson. He would finish 25th after running only six laps due to vibrations in the car. He has not competed in ARCA ever since.

== Personal life ==
Cox currently serves as an industrial technology teacher as well as a weightlifting teacher at Sale Creek Middle/High School in Soddy Daisy, Tennessee. He has also served as a high school football head coach at the school, and prior to that, coaching the Soddy Daisy Middle School football team. He had founded the Sale Creek High School football program in 2012 and was the team's first coach. In the later years of his racing career, he would adorn the top of his drivers side window where his name would be with "Teachers Office".

== Motorsports career results ==
=== ARCA Racing Series ===
(key) (Bold – Pole position awarded by qualifying time. Italics – Pole position earned by points standings or practice time. * – Most laps led. ** – All laps led.)

ARCA Racing Series results
Year	Team	No.	Make	1	2	3	4	5	6	7	8	9	10	11	12	13	14	15	16	17	18	19	20	21	22	23	24	25	ARSC	Pts	Ref
1984	Cleve Smith			DAY	ATL	TAL	CSP	SMS	FRS	MCS	LCS	IRP	TAL	FRS	ISF; DNQ	DSF	TOL	MGR											N/A	0	
1987	Cox Racing	08	Mercury	DAY	ATL	TAL	DEL	ACS	TOL	ROC	POC	FRS	KIL	TAL	FRS	ISF; 45	INF; DNQ	DSF; DNQ	SLM; DNQ	ATL									N/A	0	
1988			Mercury	DAY	ATL	TAL	FRS	PCS	ROC	POC	WIN	KIL	ACS	SLM	POC	TAL	DEL	FRS	ISF; DNQ	DSF	SLM	ATL							N/A	0	
1991		46	Chevy	DAY	ATL	KIL	TAL; 26	TOL	FRS	POC	MCH	KIL	FRS	DEL	POC	TAL	HPT	MCH	ISF	TOL	DSF	TWS	ATL						N/A	0	
1996	Hixson Motorsports	23	Chevy	DAY	ATL	SLM	TAL; 17	FIF	LVL	CLT; 22																	CLT; 19	ATL	N/A	0	
1996	Hixson Motorsports	5	Chevy								CLT; DNQ	KIL	FRS	POC	MCH	FRS	TOL	POC	MCH	INF	SBS	ISF	DSF	KIL	SLM	WIN			N/A	0	
1997	Hixson Motorsports	23	Chevy	DAY; DNQ	ATL	SLM	CLT	CLT	POC	MCH	SBS	TOL	KIL	FRS	MIN	POC	MCH	DSF	GTW	SLM	WIN	CLT	TAL	ISF	ATL; DNQ				N/A	0	
1998	Hixson Motorsports	23	Chevy	DAY	ATL	SLM	CLT	MEM	MCH	POC	SBS	TOL	PPR	POC	KIL	FRS	ISF	ATL; 28	DSF	SLM	TEX	WIN	CLT; 19	TAL; DNQ	ATL				NA	0	
1999	Hixson Motorsports	23	Chevy	DAY; DNQ	ATL; 11	SLM; 14	AND; 9	CLT; 18	MCH; 24	POC; 14	TOL; 12	SBS; 28	BLN; 10	POC; 14	KIL; 10	FRS; 20	FLM; 11	ISF; 11	WIN; 26	DSF; 7	SLM; 19	CLT; 20	TAL; 14	ATL; 16					8th	4335	
2000	Hixson Motorsports	23	Chevy	DAY; 28	SLM; 28	AND; 20	CLT; 19	KIL; 18	FRS; 26	MCH; 31	POC; 15	TOL; 12	KEN; 5	BLN; 17	POC; 35	WIN; 6	ISF; 9	KEN; 17	DSF; 9	SLM; 14	CLT; 27	TAL; 10	ATL; 37						11th	3690	
2001	Hixson Motorsports	23	Chevy	DAY; 36	NSH; 11	WIN; 7	SLM; 7	GTY; 12	KEN; 16	CLT; 11	KAN; 10	MCH; 18		MEM; 16	GLN; 13		MCH; 13	POC; 14	NSH; 23	ISF; 28		DSF; 36	SLM; 9	TOL; 6	BLN; 7	CLT; 12	TAL; 30		4th	5070	
2001	Hixson Motorsports	23	Pontiac										POC; 12			KEN; 17					CHI; 12							ATL; 15	4th	5070	
2002	Hixson Motorsports	23	Chevy	DAY; 24	ATL; 12		SLM; 22		CLT; 23	KAN; 26	POC; 4	MCH; 29	TOL; 28	SBO; 8	KEN; 14	BLN; 7	POC; 12	NSH; 6		WIN; 7		CHI; 10	SLM; 8	TAL; 16	CLT; Wth				9th	4405	
2002	Hixson Motorsports	50	Pontiac			NSH; 10																							9th	4405	
2002	Hixson Motorsports	50	Chevy					KEN; 31											ISF; 19		DSF; 26								9th	4405	
2003	Hixson Motorsports	23	Pontiac	DAY; 12				TOL; 10	KEN; 9		BLN; 3		MCH; 19					ISF; 4		DSF; 33	CHI; 16	SLM; 9	TAL; 33	CLT; 25	SBO; 7				9th	4445	
2003	Hixson Motorsports	23	Chevy		ATL; 8	NSH; 12	SLM; 15			CLT; 19		KAN; 29		LER; 24	POC; 29	POC; 21	NSH; 19		WIN; 31										9th	4445	
2004	Hixson Motorsports	23	Pontiac	DAY; 22																									29th	895	
2004	Hixson Motorsports	23	Chevy		NSH; 37	SLM; 6	KEN; 11	TOL; 25	CLT	KAN	POC	MCH	SBO	BLN	KEN	GTW	POC	LER	NSH	ISF	TOL	DSF	CHI	SLM	TAL				29th	895	
2005	Hixson Motorsports	23	Pontiac	DAY	NSH	SLM	KEN	TOL	LAN	MIL	POC; 34	MCH	KAN; 15	KEN; 21	BLN; 12	POC; 13	GTW	LER	NSH; 12	MCH	ISF	TOL	DSF	CHI	SLM	TAL			42nd	850	
2006	Shaver Motorsports	49	Pontiac	DAY	NSH; DNQ	SLM	WIN	KEN	TOL	POC	MCH	KAN	KEN	BLN	POC	GTW	NSH; 27	MCH	ISF	MIL	TOL	DSF	CHI	SLM	TAL	IOW			135th	120	
2007	Hixson Motorsports	49	Pontiac	DAY	USA	NSH; 24	SLM	KAN	WIN	KEN	TOL	IOW	POC	MCH	BLN	KEN	POC	NSH											60th	425	
2007	Bobby Gerhart Racing	5	Pontiac																ISF; 9	MIL	GTW	DSF; 21	CHI	SLM	TAL	TOL			60th	425	
2008	Hixson Motorsports	28	Chevy	DAY	SLM; 17	IOW																							59th	455	
2008	Hixson Motorsports	29	Chevy				KAN; 25	CAR	KEN; 33	TOL	POC	MCH	CAY	KEN	BLN	POC	NSH	ISF; 29	DSF; 38	CHI	SLM	NJE	TAL	TOL					59th	455	
2009	Hixson Motorsports	57	Chevy	DAY	SLM; 12	CAR; 38																							36th	810	
2009	Hixson Motorsports	28	Chevy				TAL; 24	KEN	TOL	POC	MCH	MFD; 17	IOW	KEN	BLN	POC	ISF; 2	CHI	TOL	DSF; 17	NJE	SLM	KAN	CAR					36th	810	
2010	Hixson Motorsports	29	Chevy	DAY	PBE; 31																								40th	655	
2010	Hixson Motorsports	23	Chevy			SLM; 10	TEX	TAL; 19	TOL	POC	MCH	IOW	MFD	POC; 22	BLN	NJE	ISF; 20*	CHI	DSF	TOL	SLM	KAN	CAR						40th	655	
2011	Hixson Motorsports	28	Chevy	DAY	TAL	SLM; 26	TOL; 16	NJE	CHI	POC		WIN; 16	BLN; 18	IOW; 35	IRP; 20	POC; 40	ISF; 22	MAD; 13	DSF; 17	SLM; 24	KAN; 24	TOL; 34							17th	2025	
2011	Hixson Motorsports	29	Chevy								MCH; 34																		17th	2025	
2012	Hixson Motorsports	2	Chevy	DAY	MOB	SLM	TAL	TOL	ELK	POC	MCH	WIN	NJE	IOW	CHI	IRP	POC	BLN; 22											73rd	290	
2012	Hixson Motorsports	2	Ford																ISF; 12	MAD	SLM	DSF	KAN						73rd	290	
2014	RACE 101	3	Chevy	DAY	MOB	SLM	TAL	TOL	NJE	POC	MCH; 15	ELK	WIN	CHI	IRP	POC	BLN	ISF; 19	MAD	DSF	SLM	KEN	KAN						59th	290	
2017	Hixson Motorsports	3	Chevy	DAY	NSH	SLM	TAL	TOL	ELK	POC	MCH	MAD	IOW; 25	IRP	POC	WIN	ISF	ROA	DSF	SLM	CHI	KEN	KAN						112th	105	
