= Tyler Roahrig =

American racing driver (born 1991)

- Born: April 5, 1991 (age 35); Plymouth, Indiana, U.S.

ARCA Menards Series career
- 1 race run over 1 year
- Best finish: 90th (2017)
- First race: 2017 Menards 200 Pres. by Federated Car Care (Toledo)
Wins	Top tens	Poles
0	1	0
- Statistics up to date as of February 7, 2025.

Tyler Roahrig (born April 5, 1991) is an American professional stock car racing driver who has previously competed in the ARCA Racing Series and the CARS Super Late Model Tour.

Roahrig has previously competed in series such as the ASA CRA Super Series, the ASA Southern Super Series, the UARA National Late Model Series, and the USAC Silver Crown Series.

== Motorsports results ==
=== ARCA Racing Series ===
(key) (Bold – Pole position awarded by qualifying time. Italics – Pole position earned by points standings or practice time. * – Most laps led.)

ARCA Racing Series results
Year	Team	No.	Make	1	2	3	4	5	6	7	8	9	10	11	12	13	14	15	16	17	18	19	20	ARSC	Pts	Ref
2017	Mason Mitchell Motorsports	78	Chevy	DAY	NSH	SLM	TAL	TOL; 10	ELK	POC	MCH	MAD	IOW	IRP	POC	WIN	ISF	ROA	DSF	SLM	CHI	KEN	KAN	90th	180	
