= Mason Mitchell =

American racing driver and team owner (born 1994)

- Born: June 25, 1994 (age 32); West Des Moines, Iowa, U.S.
- Achievements: 2014 ARCA Racing Series Champion

NASCAR FedEx Freight Truck Series career
- 1 race run over 1 year
- 2014 position: 66th
- Best finish: 66th (2014)
- First race: 2014 Ford EcoBoost 200 (Homestead)
| Wins | Top tens | Poles |
|---|---|---|
| 0 | 0 | 0 |

ARCA Menards Series career
- 63 races run over 8 years
- Best finish: 1st (2014)
- First race: 2012 Prairie Meadows 200 (Iowa)
- Last race: 2025 Reese's 150 (Kansas)
- First win: 2014 Ansell ActivArmr 150 (Chicagoland)
- Last win: 2015 Full Throttle S'loonshine 98.9 (Kansas)
| Wins | Top tens | Poles |
|---|---|---|
| 3 | 51 | 7 |

ARCA Menards Series East career
- 4 races run over 3 years
- Best finish: 37th (2025)
- First race: 2015 NASCAR Hall of Fame 150 (Bowman Gray)
- Last race: 2025 Atlas 150 (Iowa)
| Wins | Top tens | Poles |
|---|---|---|
| 0 | 3 | 0 |

ARCA Menards Series West career
- 1 race run over 1 year
- Best finish: 65th (2024)
- First race: 2024 MMI Oil Workers 150 (Bakersfield)
| Wins | Top tens | Poles |
|---|---|---|
| 0 | 0 | 0 |
- Statistics up to date as of September 26, 2025.

Mason Mitchell (born June 25, 1994) is an American professional stock car racing driver, team owner, and boxer. He last competed part-time in the ARCA Menards Series and the ARCA Menards Series East, driving the No. 25 Toyota for Venturini Motorsports. He also competes part-time in Dirt Trucks as an owner/driver, driving the No. 10G Chevrolet Silverado for Mason Mitchell Motorsports. He is the 2014 ARCA Racing Series champion.

== Racing career ==
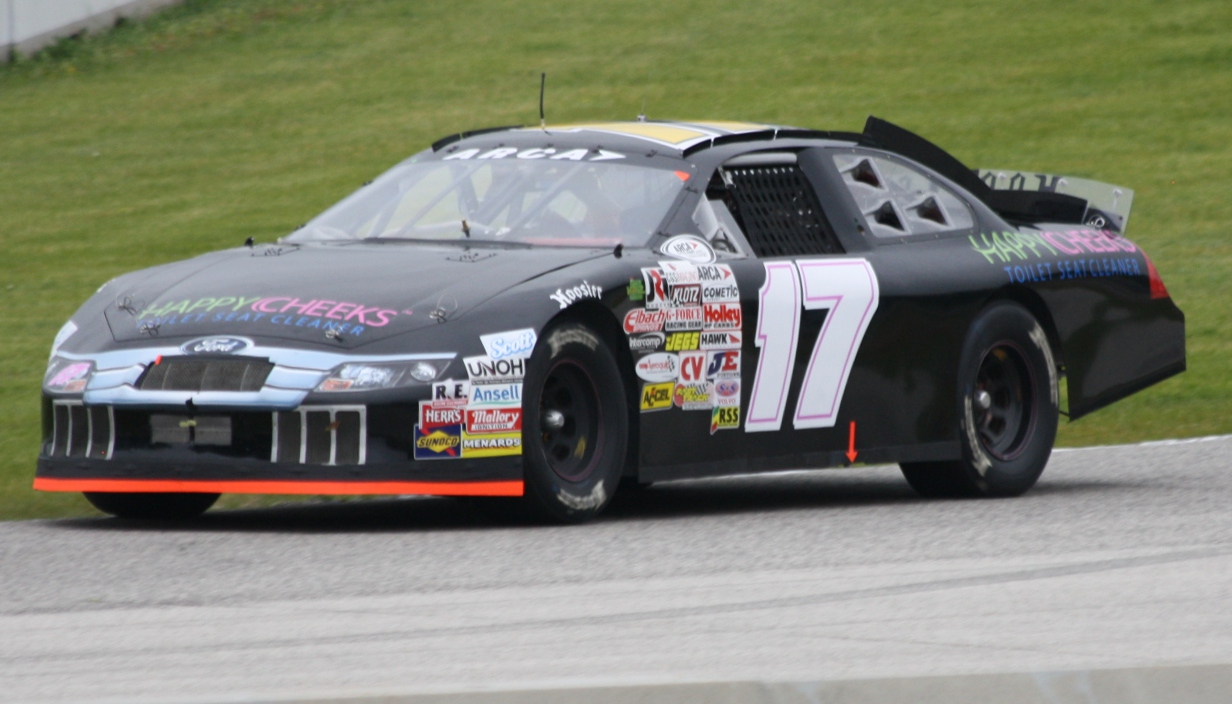
Mitchell's No. 17 ARCA car at Road America in 2013

Mitchell started racing when he was five, riding dirt bikes. Three years later, he switched to cars, competing in the Central States Region Supercups and other series Minicup Series at age ten, winning the Midwest championship; he won 75 career Minicup races, and when he was eleven, won the Jamaica Raceway track championship. When he was thirteen, he started racing late models, and joined the American Speed Association's Challenge Series National Tour two years later.

In 2012, Mitchell made his ARCA Racing Series debut for Eddie Sharp Racing at home track Iowa Speedway; after starting ninth, he finished tenth. The following year, Mitchell attempted the full season; despite missing a race and racing for four different team owners, he recorded thirteen top-tens, two poles and finished sixth in points.

In 2015, Mitchell debuted in the K&N Pro Series East Bowman Gray Stadium, driving the No. 1 Toyota for Hattori Racing Enterprises; after qualifying sixteenth, he finished eighth.

=== Mason Mitchell Motorsports ===
In late 2013, Mitchell formed Mason Mitchell Motorsports (MMM), hiring NASCAR crew chief Brad Parrott to serve the same role with Mitchell. The team began competing full-time in 2014. During the year, he recorded a win at Chicagoland Speedway, along with twelve top-fives, eighteen top-tens, five poles and an average finish of 5.8. He claimed the points lead after eight races and held on to win the series championship with a 255-point margin over runner-up Grant Enfinger. Mitchell became the first Iowa native to win an ARCA title in forty years, the third-youngest champion in series history and the third owner/driver to win the championship. Mitchell also won the Fast Track Award, S&S Volvo Laps Completed, Hoosier Speedway Challenge, R.E. Lightning Challenge and the Menards Pole Award.

After the 2014 ARCA season had ended, Mitchell made his Camping World Truck Series debut with MMM in the Ford EcoBoost 200 at Homestead-Miami Speedway. Mitchell, who had to qualify for the race based on his time, made the race with a lap time of 32.588 seconds and speed of 165.705 miles per hour (266.676 km/h), and he started the race in eighteenth. Mitchell finished the race in sixteenth.

In 2015, defending ARCA Rookie of the Year Austin Wayne Self and Ryan London, crew chief of Enfinger, joined MMM, and Mitchell scaled back his schedule, driving part-time. During the season, Mitchell drove the No. 78, and scored a hometown victory at Iowa in July. He also competed for Venturini Motorsports' No. 55 Toyota at Berlin Raceway, finishing second. Later in the year, the team also fielded the No. 88 for Truck Series driver John Wes Townley at Kansas Speedway. At the same race, Mitchell recorded his third career win.

In 2016, MMM driver Gus Dean won his first career ARCA race at Talladega Superspeedway in the No. 98 GREE Cooling Products Chevrolet after beating Josh Williams to the line. Dean would later compete in select events with MMM before moving to Win-Tron Racing in 2017 with the GREE sponsorship.

The team ceased operations from their Mooresville, North Carolina shop on July 30, 2018 and their assets were purchased by Empire Racing.

=== ARCA return ===
After a six-year hiatus from racing in ARCA, it was announced on March 22, 2024, that Mitchell would return to the series part-time in 2024, running the West Series race at Irwindale Speedway and the East Series combination race at Iowa Speedway, driving the No. 23 car for Sigma Performance Services.

Mitchell would run more races in 2025, this time driving for Venturini Motorsports.

== Motorsports career results ==
=== NASCAR ===
(key) (Bold – Pole position awarded by qualifying time. Italics – Pole position earned by points standings or practice time. * – Most laps led.)

==== Camping World Truck Series ====
NASCAR Camping World Truck Series results
| Year | Team | No. | Make | 1 | 2 | 3 | 4 | 5 | 6 | 7 | 8 | 9 | 10 | 11 | 12 | 13 | 14 | 15 | 16 | 17 | 18 | 19 | 20 | 21 | 22 | NCWTC | Pts | Ref |
|---|---|---|---|---|---|---|---|---|---|---|---|---|---|---|---|---|---|---|---|---|---|---|---|---|---|---|---|---|
| 2014 | Mason Mitchell Motorsports | 48 | Ford | DAY | MAR | KAN | CLT | DOV | TEX | GTW | KEN | IOW | ELD | POC | MCH | BRI | MSP | CHI | NHA | LVS | TAL | MAR | TEX | PHO | HOM; 16 | 66th | 28 | |

=== ARCA Menards Series ===
(key) (Bold – Pole position awarded by qualifying time. Italics – Pole position earned by points standings or practice time. * – Most laps led.)

ARCA Menards Series results
| Year | Team | No. | Make | 1 | 2 | 3 | 4 | 5 | 6 | 7 | 8 | 9 | 10 | 11 | 12 | 13 | 14 | 15 | 16 | 17 | 18 | 19 | 20 | 21 | AMSC | Pts | Ref |
|---|---|---|---|---|---|---|---|---|---|---|---|---|---|---|---|---|---|---|---|---|---|---|---|---|---|---|---|
| 2012 | Eddie Sharp Racing | 6 | Chevy | DAY | MOB | SLM | TAL | TOL | ELK | POC | MCH | WIN | NJE | IOW; 10 | CHI | IRP; 5 | POC | BLN; 5 | ISF | MAD | SLM | DSF | KAN; 7 | | 31st | 785 | |
| 2013 | Roulo Brothers Racing | 99 | Ford | DAY; 13 | MOB; 8 | SLM; 16 | TAL; 25 | TOL; 7 | ELK; 11 | POC; 5 | MCH; 19 | | WIN; 5 | | | | | | | | | | | | 6th | 4660 | |
| 2013 | Roulo Brothers Racing | 17 | Ford | | | | | | | | | ROA; 14 | | | | | | | | | | | | | 6th | 4660 | |
| 2013 | Kimmel Racing | 68 | Ford | | | | | | | | | | | CHI; 22 | NJE | | | | | | | | | | 6th | 4660 | |
| 2013 | Empire Racing | 82 | Ford | | | | | | | | | | | | | POC; 8 | **BLN**; 5 | **ISF**; 7 | MAD; 7 | DSF; 6 | IOW; 6 | SLM; 5 | KEN; 2 | KAN; 2 | 6th | 4660 | |
| 2014 | Mason Mitchell Motorsports | 98 | Ford | DAY; 7 | MOB; 3 | SLM; 7 | TAL; 4 | **TOL**; 2* | NJE; 10 | POC; 2 | **MCH**; 2 | ELK; 10 | WIN; 2* | CHI; 1 | IRP; 20 | **POC**; 7 | **BLN**; 10 | **ISF**; 2 | **MAD**; 14 | **DSF**; 4 | SLM; 2* | KEN; 3 | KAN; 5 | | 1st | 5240 | |
| 2015 | Mason Mitchell Motorsports | 78 | Ford | DAY; 6 | MOB; 19 | NSH | SLM | TAL | TOL | NJE | | | | | | | | | | | | | KAN; 1 | | 22nd | 1260 | |
| 2015 | Mason Mitchell Motorsports | 78 | Chevy | | | | | | | | POC; 3 | MCH | CHI | WIN | IOW; 1* | IRP | POC | | | | | | | | 22nd | 1260 | |
| 2015 | Venturini Motorsports | 55 | Toyota | | | | | | | | | | | | | | | BLN; 2 | ISF | DSF | SLM | KEN | | | 22nd | 1260 | |
| 2016 | Mason Mitchell Motorsports | 78 | Chevy | DAY | NSH | SLM | TAL | TOL | NJE | POC | MCH | MAD | WIN | IOW; 8 | IRP | POC | BLN | ISF | | | | | | | 42nd | 570 | |
| 2016 | Mason Mitchell Motorsports | 98 | Chevy | | | | | | | | | | | | | | | | DSF; 6 | SLM | CHI | KEN | KAN; 10 | | 42nd | 570 | |
| 2017 | Mason Mitchell Motorsports | 88 | Chevy | DAY | NSH | SLM | TAL | TOL | ELK | POC | MCH | MAD | IOW; 14 | IRP | POC | WIN | ISF | ROA | DSF | SLM | CHI | KEN | KAN | | 94th | 160 | |
| 2018 | Mason Mitchell Motorsports | 98 | Chevy | DAY | NSH | SLM | TAL | TOL | CLT | POC | MCH | MAD | GTW | CHI | IOW; 7 | ELK | POC | ISF | BLN | DSF | SLM | IRP | KAN | | 77th | 195 | |
| 2024 | Sigma Performance Services | 23 | Chevy | DAY | PHO | TAL | DOV | KAN | CLT | IOW; 4 | MOH | BLN | IRP | SLM | ELK | MCH | ISF | MLW | DSF | GLN | BRI | KAN | TOL | | 77th | 40 | |
| 2025 | Venturini Motorsports | 25 | Toyota | DAY | PHO | TAL | KAN; 3 | CLT | MCH | BLN; 7 | ELK | LRP | DOV | IRP; 15 | IOW; 9 | GLN | ISF | MAD; 6 | DSF | BRI | SLM; 6 | KAN; 6 | TOL | | 17th | 256 | |

==== ARCA Menards Series East ====
ARCA Menards Series East results
| Year | Team | No. | Make | 1 | 2 | 3 | 4 | 5 | 6 | 7 | 8 | 9 | 10 | 11 | 12 | 13 | 14 | AMSEC | Pts | Ref |
|---|---|---|---|---|---|---|---|---|---|---|---|---|---|---|---|---|---|---|---|---|
| 2015 | Hattori Racing Enterprises | 1 | Toyota | NSM | GRE | BRI | IOW | BGS; 8 | LGY | COL | NHA | IOW | GLN | MOT | VIR | RCH | DOV | 45th | 36 | |
| 2024 | Sigma Performance Services | 23 | Chevy | FIF | DOV | NSV | FRS | IOW; 4 | IRP | MLW | BRI | | | | | | | 40th | 40 | |
| 2025 | Venturini Motorsports | 25 | Toyota | FIF | CAR | NSV | FRS | DOV | IRP; 15 | IOW; 9 | BRI | | | | | | | 37th | 64 | |

==== ARCA Menards Series West ====
ARCA Menards Series West results
| Year | Team | No. | Make | 1 | 2 | 3 | 4 | 5 | 6 | 7 | 8 | 9 | 10 | 11 | 12 | AMSWC | Pts | Ref |
|---|---|---|---|---|---|---|---|---|---|---|---|---|---|---|---|---|---|---|
| 2024 | Sigma Performance Services | 23 | Chevy | PHO | KER; 18 | PIR | SON | IRW | IRW | SHA | TRI | MAD | AAS | KER | PHO | 65th | 26 | |

^{*} Season still in progress
^{1} Ineligible for series points

Sporting positions
| Preceded by Frank Kimmel | ARCA Racing Series Champion; 2014 | Succeeded by Grant Enfinger |
