= Mason Mingus =

American racing driver (born 1994)

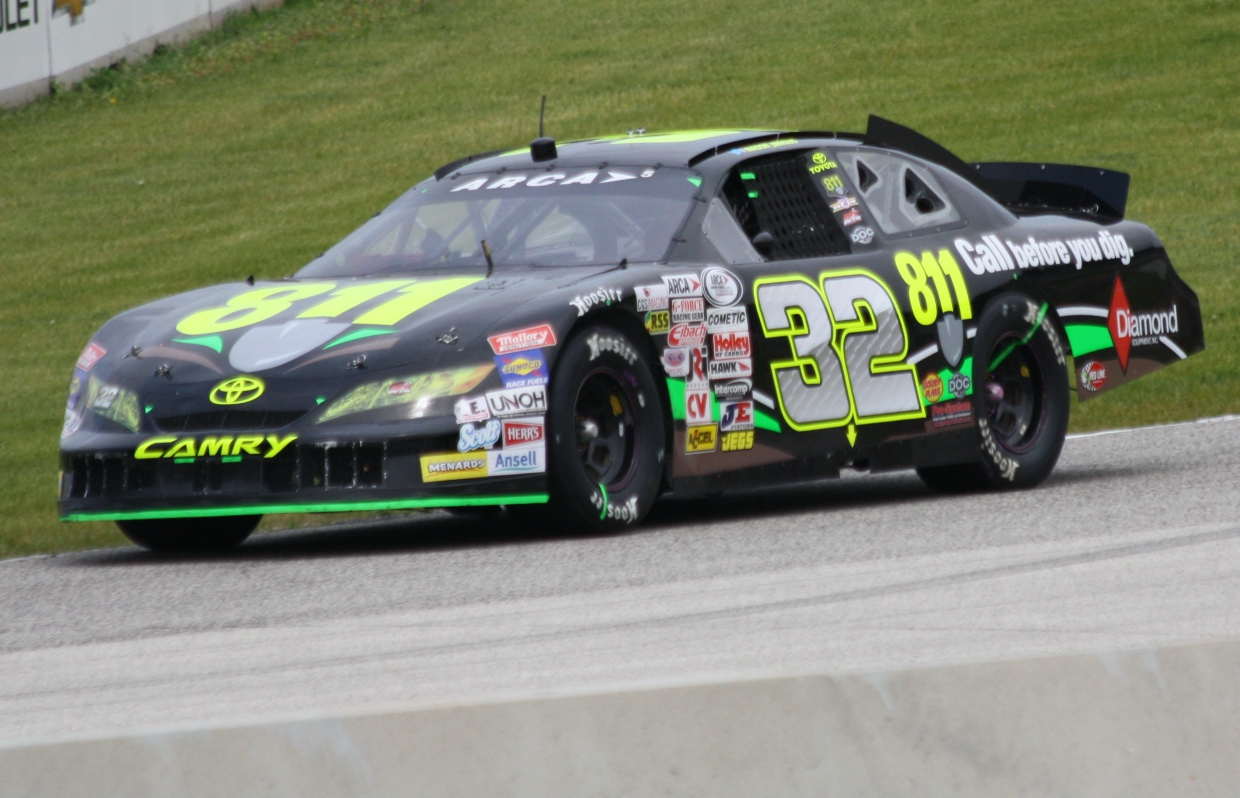
- Mingus competing in the ARCA race at Road America in 2013
- Born: November 28, 1994 (age 31); Louisville, Kentucky, U.S.
- Achievements: 2010 Ken-Ten Pro Late Model Series Champion; 2019 All American 400 Winner

NASCAR O'Reilly Auto Parts Series career
- 4 races run over 1 year
- 2015 position: 104th
- Best finish: 104th (2015)
- First race: 2015 Furious 7 300 (Joliet)
- Last race: 2015 Ford EcoBoost 300 (Homestead)
Wins	Top tens	Poles
0	0	0

NASCAR FedEx Freight Truck Series career
- 45 races run over 3 years
- 2015 position: 14th
- Best finish: 11th (2014)
- First race: 2013 Fred's 250 (Talladega)
- Last race: 2015 Ford EcoBoost 200 (Homestead)
Wins	Top tens	Poles
0	4	0

ARCA Menards Series career
- 40 races run over 6 years
- Best finish: 2nd (2013)
- First race: 2011 Kentuckiana Ford Dealers ARCA Fall Classic (Salem)
- Last race: 2021 Sioux Chief PowerPEX 200 (Salem)
Wins	Top tens	Poles
0	29	2

ARCA Menards Series East career
- 4 races run over 2 years
- Best finish: 17th (2021)
- First race: 2021 Crosley Record Pressing 200 (Nashville Fairgrounds)
- Last race: 2022 Music City 200 (Nashville Fairgrounds)
Wins	Top tens	Poles
0	3	1
- Statistics up to date as of May 7, 2022.

Mason Mingus (born November 28, 1994) is an American professional stock car racing driver who last competed part-time in the ARCA Menards Series East, driving the No. 11 for Fast Track Racing, as well as part-time in the ARCA/CRA Super Series, driving the No. 5 Toyota Camry for Wauters Motorsports.

== Racing career ==
=== Early career ===
Mingus began his racing career in 2002, competing in quarter midget competition, moving up to the MMRA Mini Cup Series in 2005 and the MMRA Baby Grand Series in 2008, winning the series championship. In 2009 he joined the Ken-Ten Pro Late Model Series, finishing eighth in series points; he returned to the series in 2010 and won the circuit's championship.

In 2011, Mingus moved to the Champion Racing Association CRA Super Series, competing in that series in 2011 and 2012; he also made his ARCA Racing Series debut in 2011, driving for Win-Tron Racing at Salem Speedway. He returned with the team for a limited schedule in 2012 in addition to the full CRA Super Series schedule; he shuffled his racing career with football obligations, qualifying for the All-American 400 in October on the same day as a playoff football game.

=== ARCA and NASCAR ===
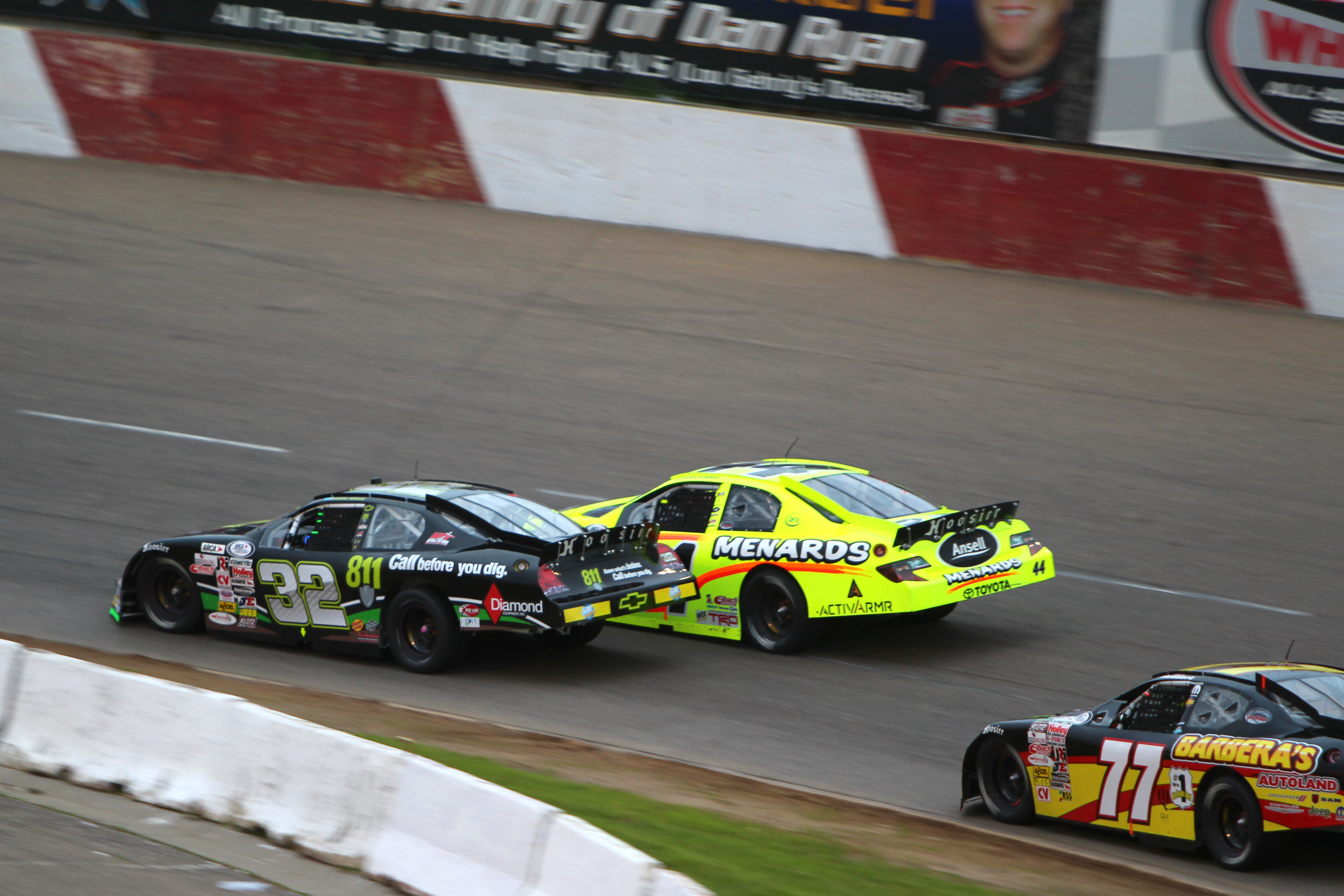
Mingus (No. 32) racing Frank Kimmel (No. 44) for position in the ARCA race at Elko in 2013

In 2013, Mingus competed full-time in the ARCA Racing Series, finishing second in series points behind champion Frank Kimmel. In October, following the end of the ARCA season, Mingus made his debut in NASCAR competition, driving for Win-Tron Racing in the Camping World Truck Series Fred's 250 at Talladega Superspeedway; he also planned to compete in races later in the season at Phoenix International Raceway and Homestead-Miami Speedway. He qualified twelfth at Talladega in his debut, but finished last in the race after early engine issues. He also competed in races at Phoenix International Raceway and Homestead-Miami Speedway in November, posting a best finish of 22nd at Phoenix.

In January 2014, it was announced that Mingus would be competing in the Camping World Truck Series full-time in 2014 driving the No. 35 Toyota Tundra for Win-Tron Racing, running for Rookie of the Year. Mingus started the season being involved in a big one at Daytona, resulting in a 28th-place finish. Mingus then had a consistent finish in later races, until Win-Tron Racing parted ways with Mingus. Mingus was later offered a ride with Billy Boat Motorsports to drive for the remainder of the 2014 season.

On May 6, 2021, it was announced that Mingus would return to ARCA, driving at his home track of the Nashville Fairgrounds Speedway in the No. 11 for Fast Track Racing. This was his debut in the ARCA Menards Series East, which was previously the NASCAR K&N Pro Series East.

== Personal life ==
Mingus was born in Louisville, Kentucky, but grew up in Brentwood, Tennessee. He is a graduate of Franklin Road Academy, where he competed in wrestling, track, and football.

== Motorsports career results ==
=== NASCAR ===
(key) (Bold – Pole position awarded by qualifying time. Italics – Pole position earned by points standings or practice time. * – Most laps led.)

==== Xfinity Series ====
NASCAR Xfinity Series results
Year	Team	No.	Make	1	2	3	4	5	6	7	8	9	10	11	12	13	14	15	16	17	18	19	20	21	22	23	24	25	26	27	28	29	30	31	32	33	NXSC	Pts	Ref
2015	Obaika Racing	97	Chevy	DAY	ATL	LVS	PHO	CAL	TEX	BRI	RCH	TAL	IOW	CLT	DOV	MCH	CHI	DAY	KEN	NHA	IND	IOW	GLN	MOH	BRI	ROA	DAR	RCH	CHI; 24	KEN	DOV	CLT	KAN; 24	TEX; 24	PHO	HOM; 26	104th	0^{1}	

==== Camping World Truck Series ====
NASCAR Camping World Truck Series results
Year	Team	No.	Make	1	2	3	4	5	6	7	8	9	10	11	12	13	14	15	16	17	18	19	20	21	22	23	NCWTC	Pts	Ref
2013	Win-Tron Racing	35	Chevy	DAY	MAR	CAR	KAN	CLT	DOV	TEX	KEN	IOW	ELD	POC	MCH	BRI	MSP	IOW	CHI	LVS	TAL; 36	MAR	TEX	PHO; 22	HOM; 25		46th	49	
2014	Win-Tron Racing	35	Toyota	DAY; 28	MAR; 29	KAN; 10	CLT; 20	DOV; 26	TEX; 19	GTW; 12	KEN; 19	IOW; 16	ELD; 22	POC; 17	MCH; 16	BRI; 22	MSP; 14	CHI; 16	NHA; 17								11th	545	
2014	Billy Boat Motorsports	15	Chevy																	LVS; 18	TAL; 32	MAR; 15	TEX; 13	PHO; 13	HOM; 29		11th	545	
2015	Billy Boat Motorsports	15	Chevy	DAY; DNQ	ATL; 28	MAR; 22	KAN; 9	CLT; 26	DOV; 29	TEX; 13	GTW; 28	IOW; 16	KEN; 19	ELD	POC; 12	MCH; 24	BRI; 29	MSP; 14	CHI; 26	NHA; 14	LVS; 20	TAL; 3	MAR; 18	TEX; 18	PHO; 10	HOM; 20	14th	527	

=== ARCA Menards Series ===
(key) (Bold – Pole position awarded by qualifying time. Italics – Pole position earned by points standings or practice time. * – Most laps led.)

ARCA Menards Series results
Year	Team	No.	Make	1	2	3	4	5	6	7	8	9	10	11	12	13	14	15	16	17	18	19	20	21	AMSC	Pts	Ref
2011	Win-Tron Racing	32	Toyota	DAY	TAL	SLM	TOL	NJE	CHI	POC	MCH	WIN	BLN	IOW	IRP	POC	ISF	MAD	DSF	SLM; 34	KAN	TOL			157th	60	
2012	Win-Tron Racing	32	Toyota	DAY	MOB; 19	SLM; 10	TAL	TOL; 15				WIN; 6	NJE; 8						ISF; 8		SLM; 6	DSF	KAN		18th	1930	
2012	Win-Tron Racing	32	Chevy						ELK; 9	POC	MCH			IOW; 12	CHI	IRP; 10	POC	BLN; 29		MAD; 23					18th	1930	
2013	Win-Tron Racing	32	Toyota	DAY; 7	**MOB**; 4	SLM; 10	TAL; 2			POC; 6	MCH; 6	ROA; 10	WIN; 12	CHI; 6	NJE; 8	POC; 6	BLN; 2		MAD; 5		**IOW**; 7	SLM; 9	KEN; 10	KAN; 9	2nd	5370	
2013	Win-Tron Racing	32	Chevy					TOL; 2	ELK; 9									ISF; 16		DSF; 12					2nd	5370	
2016	Mason Mitchell Motorsports	98	Chevy	DAY	NSH	SLM	TAL	TOL	NJE	POC	MCH	MAD	WIN	IOW	IRP	POC	BLN	ISF	DSF	SLM; 8	CHI	KEN	KAN		42nd	570	
2017	Win-Tron Racing	33	Toyota	DAY	NSH; 5	SLM; 11	TAL	TOL	ELK	POC	MCH	MAD	IOW	IRP	POC	WIN	ISF	ROA	DSF	SLM	CHI	KEN	KAN		50th	385	
2021	Fast Track Racing	11	Ford	DAY	PHO	TAL	KAN	TOL	CLT	MOH	POC	ELK	BLN; 7	IOW	WIN	GLN	MCH	ISF	MLW	DSF	BRI; 17	SLM; 6	KAN		36th	102	

==== ARCA Menards Series East ====
ARCA Menards Series East results
Year	Team	No.	Make	1	2	3	4	5	6	7	8	AMSEC	Pts	Ref
2021	Fast Track Racing	11	Ford	NSM	FIF	**NSV**; 3	DOV	SNM; 8	IOW	MLW	BRI; 17	17th	106	
2022	Ferrier-McClure Racing	44	Ford	NSM	FIF	DOV	NSV; 4	IOW	MLW	BRI		38th	40	

=== CARS Super Late Model Tour ===
(key)

CARS Super Late Model Tour results
Year	Team	No.	Make	1	2	3	4	5	6	7	8	9	CSLMTC	Pts	Ref
2018	N/A	5	Toyota	MYB	NSH; 32	ROU	HCY	BRI; 4	AND	HCY	ROU	SBO	N/A	0	

^{*} Season still in progress
^{1} Ineligible for series points
