= Mason Mitchell Motorsports =

Defunct stock car racing team

- Owner(s): Mason Mitchell; Brad Parrott
- Base: Mooresville, North Carolina
- Series: NASCAR Camping World Truck Series; ARCA Racing Series
- Manufacturer: Chevrolet, Ford
- Opened: 2013
- Closed: 2018

Career
- Debut: NASCAR Camping World Truck Series: 2014 Ford EcoBoost 200 (Homestead-Miami); ARCA Racing Series: 2014 Lucas Oil 200 presented by MAVTV American Real (Daytona)
- Latest race: NASCAR Camping World Truck Series: 2014 Ford EcoBoost 200 (Homestead-Miami); ARCA Racing Series: 2018 ModSpace 150 (Pocono)
- Races competed: Total: 123; NASCAR Camping World Truck Series: 1 ARCA Racing Series: 122
- Drivers' Championships: Total: 1 NASCAR Camping World Truck Series: 0 ARCA Racing Series: 1
- Race victories: Total: 7 NASCAR Camping World Truck Series: 0 ARCA Racing Series: 7
- Pole positions: Total: 6 NASCAR Camping World Truck Series: 0 ARCA Racing Series: 6

Mason Mitchell Motorsports (MMM) was an American stock car racing team that competed in the ARCA Racing Series from 2014 to 2018. The team was founded in 2013 by Mason Mitchell, and veteran NASCAR crew chief Brad Parrott, and they last fielded the No. 78 Chevrolet SS for multiple drivers, and the No. 98 Chevrolet SS, also for multiple drivers. They won the 2014 ARCA Racing Series championship with owner/driver, Mason Mitchell.

The team ceased their operations on July 30, 2018, with their assets being purchased by Empire Racing.

== History ==
In late 2013, the ARCA Rookie of the Year contender, Mason Mitchell, announced that he will be forming his own team for the 2014 ARCA Racing Series season, called Mason Mitchell Motorsports (MMM). He would hire the veteran NASCAR crew chief, Brad Parrott, as the same role as Mitchell, to help run his team. He would run his shop out of Mooresville, North Carolina, stating that “We felt like, to have the proper resources and the right people, it was a necessity to have our shop here. Everyone we do business with is right here or right up the street.”

== NASCAR Camping World Truck Series ==
=== Truck No. 48 history ===
After the 2014 ARCA season ended, Mitchell would attempt to make his NASCAR Camping World Truck Series debut for MMM at Homestead–Miami Speedway. Mitchell had to qualify for the race on speed, which he successfully did, with a lap of 32.588 seconds, and a speed of 165.705 mph (266.676 km/h). After starting the race in 18th, he would run inside the top 15 for the majority of the race. He would finish the race in 16th. This ended up being the team's only truck series start.

==== Truck No. 48 results ====
Mason Mitchell Motorsports No. 48
NASCAR Camping World Truck Series results
Year	Driver	No.	Make	1	2	3	4	5	6	7	8	9	10	11	12	13	14	15	16	17	18	19	20	21	22	Owners	Pts
2014	Mason Mitchell	48	Ford	DAY	MAR	KAN	CLT	DOV	TEX	GTW	KEN	IOW	ELD	POC	MCH	BRI	MSP	CHI	NHA	LVS	TAL	MAR	TEX	PHO	HOM; 16	57th	28

== ARCA Racing Series ==
=== Car No. 28 history ===
In 2017, Mitchell would field this car for Michael Self in two races. Mitchell used the owners points from MDM Motorsports for both entries. In his first start at Pocono Raceway, Self qualified in 11th. He would run inside the top 5 for most of the race, and ended up finishing in 3rd. He followed with a 4th-place finish in his second start at Iowa Speedway.

=== Car No. 78 history ===
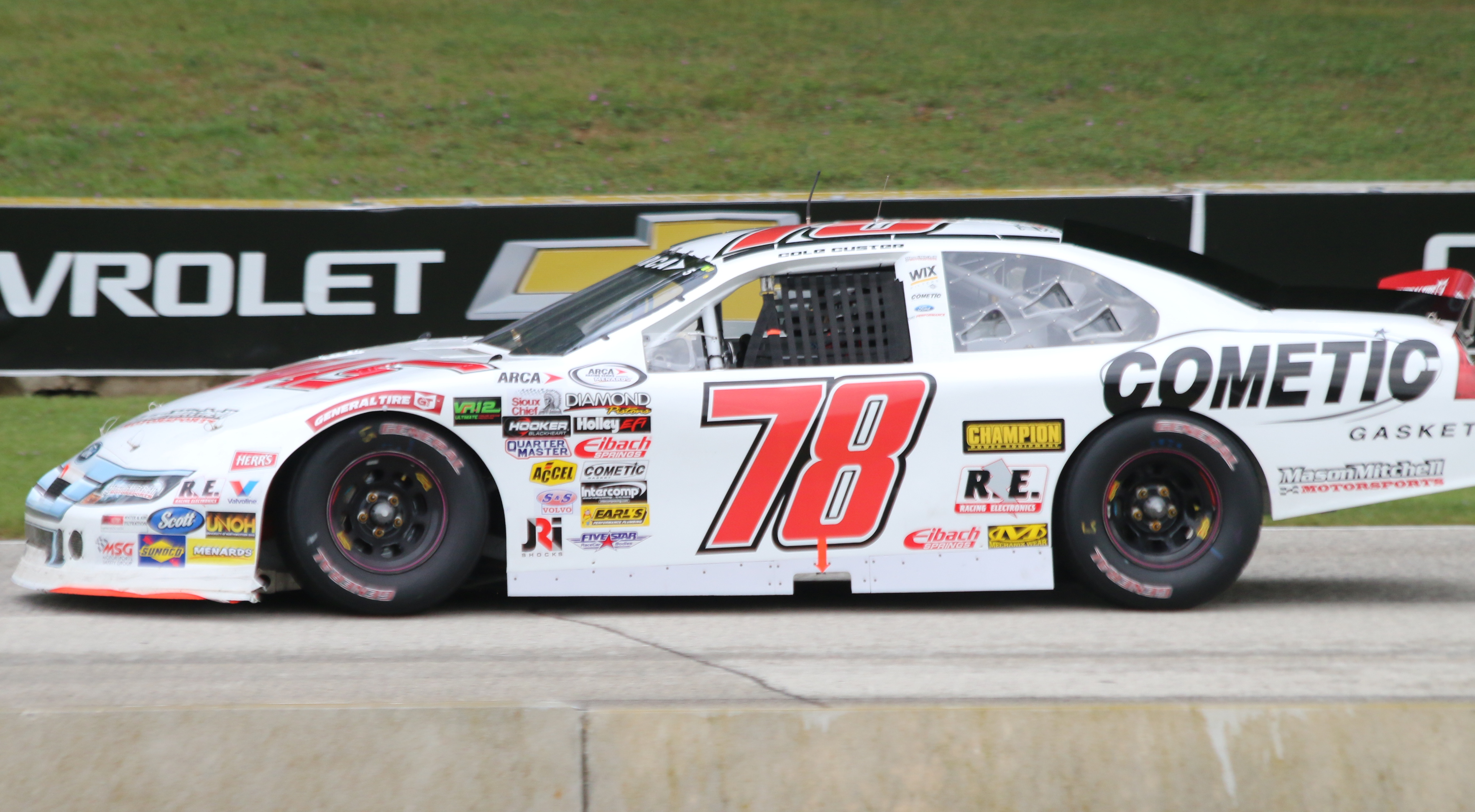
Cole Custer in the No. 78 car at Road America in 2017.

==== Multiple drivers (2015-2018) ====
Mitchell began fielding this car in 2015, with himself as the driver for six races. He would capture two wins in those six starts, Iowa and Kansas. Kody Evans, a late model racer that competed in the Champion Racing Association, made his ARCA debut in the No. 78 car at Salem Speedway. After running as high as 5th, he would end up finishing the race in 12th. Another late model racer, Noah Gragson, made his debut at Kentucky Speedway. He qualified 7th, but finished 14th, due to losing a cylinder. The car ran a four race schedule in 2016, with Cole Powell running Daytona, Noah Gragson at Pocono, Mitchell at Iowa, and Gus Dean at Lucas Oil Raceway. Powell and Gragson would both finish in the top 30, after being involved in wrecks. Mitchell and Dean would both finish inside the top 10, getting 8th and 9th respectively. The team ran the full 2017 ARCA schedule with several drivers. Kyle Weatherman drove for 7 races, Justin Haley, Chase Purdy, and Sheldon Creed drove for 2 races, while Tyler Roahrig, Cole Anderson, Ryan Repko, Trevor Noles, Myatt Snider, Blaine Perkins, and Cole Custer ran one race. Haley would give MMM their seventh and final win, after taking the checkered flag at Pocono Raceway in July. Originally, the team was expected to run full-time for the 2018 season, but would cease its operations after the 14th race. Max Tullman drove for 8 races, Colby Howard drove for 2, while Repko, Grant Enfinger, Perkins, and Quin Houff ran one race. The 78 car ran its final race at Pocono Raceway, with Quin Houff behind the wheel. After starting in 8th, Houff would finish 21st, 1 lap down.

=== Car No. 88 history ===
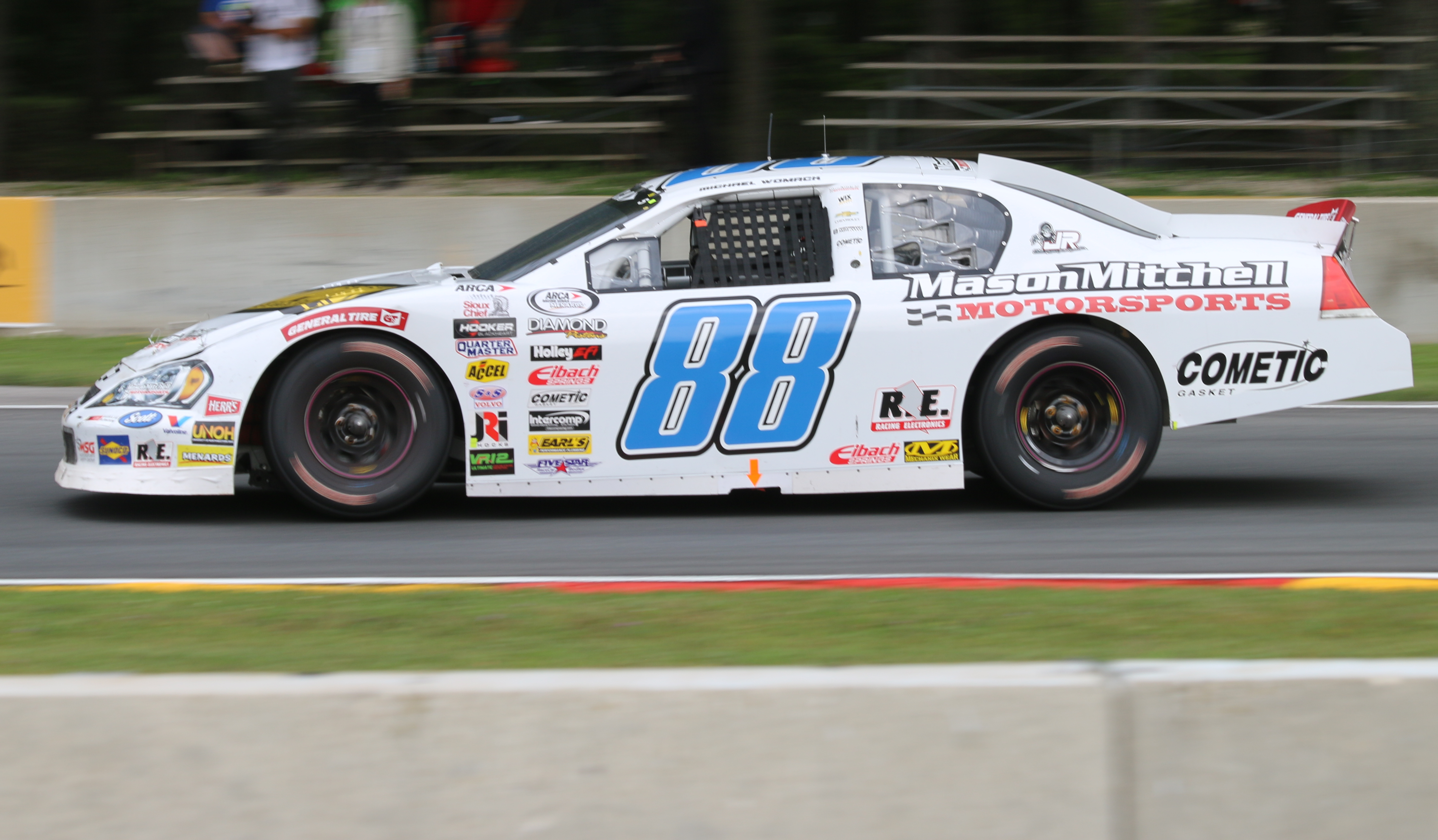
Michael Womack in the No. 88 car at Road America in 2017.

==== John Wes Townley (2015) ====
Mitchell fielded this car as a third entry in 2015. They only ran one race, with John Wes Townley as the driver for Kansas. Townley started in 6th, and would run inside the top 5 for most of the race. He finished in 5th, respectively.

==== Multiple drivers (2017) ====
After not running any races in 2016, Mitchell began fielding the 88 car again, with six drivers behind the wheel. Kaz Grala drove the car at Daytona, Brandon Lynn at Talladega, himself at Iowa, Michael Womack at Road America, Michael Self at Chicagoland, and Chase Purdy at Kentucky. Womack would give them their best finish, getting 5th at Road America. Grala, Self, and Purdy would also finish inside the top 10 in their starts. The 88 car did not return for 2018.

=== Car No. 98 history ===
==== Mason Mitchell (2014) ====
MMM's first official start came in 2014, with Mitchell running the full ARCA schedule. He started with a 7th-place finish in Daytona, followed by a 3rd-place finish at Mobile International Speedway. He would finish 7th again at Salem Speedway, along with a streak of top 5 finishes in the next two races. He would stay consistent for the whole season, finishing inside the top 10 in all but two races. After the 8th race at Michigan, he took the points lead away from Grant Enfinger. Despite only winning one race, Mitchell would keep the points lead and win the championship, due to his consistency. He ended the season with 1 win, 12 top fives, 18 top tens, and five poles. He became the third-youngest champion in series history, and the third owner/driver to win the championship. Mitchell would convert to a part-time schedule in 2015.

==== Austin Wayne Self (2015) ====
The 2014 ARCA Rookie of the Year, Austin Wayne Self, would be announced as the new full-time driver for the 98 car in 2015, as Mitchell would transition from driver to owner, although he did make occasionally starts. Self started out with a 15th-place finish at Daytona, followed by a 4th-place finish at Mobile. He gave the team their fourth career win, after taking the checkered flag at Winchester Speedway. Self would show some consistency, although he did get some bad runs. Despite winning one race, he finished 2nd in the final point standings. He ended the season with 1 win, 6 top fives, 12 top tens, and two poles.

==== Multiple drivers (2016-2018) ====
The 98 car would continue running full-time in 2016, but with several drivers sharing the car. Gus Dean drove for 5 races, Brady Boswell for 6 races, Kyle Weatherman and Mitchell for 2 races, with David Levine, Quinnton Bear, Justin Haley, Mason Mingus, and Brent Sherman for one race. Dean gave MMM their fifth career win, after beating Josh Williams in a close finish at Talladega. It was followed by another win with Justin Haley, after taking the checkered flag at the Illinois State Fairgrounds Racetrack. For 2017, the car only ran for 2 races, with Quin Houff driving at Daytona, and Leilani Munter driving at Talladega. Munter's entry was fielded in a collaboration with Venturini Motorsports. Houff and Munter would both finish 28th in their starts, after being involved in wrecks. They returned for a partial schedule in 2018, with Houff and Blaine Perkins driving 3 races, and Mitchell driving for one. The 98 car ran its final race at Iowa, with Mitchell behind the wheel. He started 23rd and would finish 7th, respectively.
