= Road America 100 =

Former ARCA Menards Series race at Road America

ARCA Menards Series
- Venue: Road America
- Location: Elkhart Lake, Wisconsin, United States
- First race: 2013
- Last race: 2017
- Distance: 101 mi (162.544 km)
- Laps: 25
- Previous names: Scott 160 (2013)
- Most wins (manufacturer): Ford (2)

Circuit information
- Surface: Asphalt
- Length: 4.048 mi (6.515 km)
- Turns: 14

The Road America 100 was an ARCA Menards Series race held at the Road America in Elkhart Lake, Wisconsin. It was originally 161.920 miles, but was shortened to 101 miles. It supported the NASCAR Xfinity Series Henry 180 in 2013 and 2017.

== Past winners ==
=== ARCA Menards Series ===
Year	Date	Driver	Manufacturer	Race Distance		Race Time	Average Speed (mph)
Year	Date	Driver	Manufacturer	Laps	Miles (km)	Race Time	Average Speed (mph)
2013	June 22	Chris Buescher	Ford	40	161.920 (260.585)	2:28:44	95.811
2014 - 2016	Not held						
2017	August 27	Austin Theriault	Ford	25	101.200 (162.866)	1:13:30	82.612
