= 2026 Alabama Manufactured Housing 200 =

ARCA Menards Series race at Talladega Superspeedway

Race details
- Race 4 of 20 in the 2026 ARCA Menards Series
- Date: April 25, 2026
- Location: Talladega Superspeedway in Lincoln, Alabama
- Course: Permanent racing facility
- Course length: 2.66 miles (4.28 km)
- Distance: 76 laps, 202.160 mi (325.344 km)
- Average speed: 105.997 miles per hour (170.586 km/h)

Pole position
Driver	Gio Ruggiero	Joe Gibbs Racing
- Grid positions set by competition-based formula

Most laps led
Driver	Gio Ruggiero	Joe Gibbs Racing
- Laps: 45

Fastest lap
Driver	Taylor Reimer	Pinnacle Racing Group
- Time: 51.207

Winner
No. 71	Andy Jankowiak	KLAS Motorsports

Television in the United States
- Network: FS1
- Announcers: Brent Stover, Phil Parsons, Austin Cindric, and Brenden Queen

Radio in the United States
- Radio: MRN
- Booth announcers: Alex Hayden and Mike Bagley
- Turn announcers: Tim Catalfamo (Backstretch)

The 2026 Alabama Manufactured Housing 200 was an ARCA Menards Series race held on Saturday, April 25, 2026, at Talladega Superspeedway in Lincoln, Alabama. Contested over 76 laps on the 2.66 mile (4.28 km) superspeedway, it was the fourth race of the 2026 ARCA Menards Series season, and the 64th running of the event.

In an action-packed race, Andy Jankowiak, driving for KLAS Motorsports, scored the upset win after making a last-lap, three-wide pass on Cleetus McFarland and Gus Dean. This was Jankowiak's first ARCA Menards Series win in his 48th career start. McFarland finished second after leading a career-high 19 laps, and Dean finished third. Isabella Robusto and pole-sitter Gio Ruggiero rounded out the top five, while Taylor Reimer, Sean Corr, Ryan Vargas, Jack Wood, and Daniel Dye rounded out the top ten.

== Report ==
=== Background ===
Talladega Superspeedway, the track where the race will be held.

Talladega Superspeedway, formerly known as Alabama International Motor Speedway, is a motorsports complex located north of Talladega, Alabama. It is located on the former Anniston Air Force Base in the small city of Lincoln. A tri-oval, the track was constructed in 1969 by the International Speedway Corporation, a business controlled by the France family. Talladega is most known for its steep banking. The track currently hosts NASCAR's Cup Series, Xfinity Series and Craftsman Truck Series. Talladega is the longest NASCAR oval with a length of 2.66-mile-long (4.28 km) tri-oval like the Daytona International Speedway, which is 2.5-mile-long (4.0 km).

Alabama Manufactured Housing was announced as the title sponsor of the race on July 28, 2025.

==== Entry list ====
- (R) denotes rookie driver.

#	Driver	Team	Make
0	George Siciliano	Rette Jones Racing	Ford
01	Cody Dennison	Fast Track Racing	Ford
1	Andrew Patterson	Maples Motorsports	Chevrolet
03	Alex Clubb	Clubb Racing Inc.	Ford
06	Con Nicolopoulos	Wayne Peterson Motorsports	Chevrolet
7	Eric Caudell	CCM Racing	Toyota
8	Sean Corr	Empire Racing	Chevrolet
10	Ed Pompa	Fast Track Racing	Chevrolet
11	Bryce Haugeberg	Fast Track Racing	Toyota
12	Takuma Koga	Fast Track Racing	Toyota
15	Jake Finch	Nitro Motorsports	Toyota
17	Monty Tipton	Cook Racing Technologies	Chevrolet
18	Gio Ruggiero	Joe Gibbs Racing	Toyota
19	Matt Kemp	Maples Motorsports	Chevrolet
20	Jake Bollman (R)	Nitro Motorsports	Toyota
22	Nick White	White Motorsports	Chevrolet
24	Daniel Dye	SPS Racing	Ford
25	Gus Dean	Nitro Motorsports	Toyota
26	Ron Vandermeir Jr.	Vanco Racing	Toyota
27	Tim Richmond	Tim Richmond Racing	Toyota
28	Jack Wood	Pinnacle Racing Group	Chevrolet
30	Garrett Mitchell	Rette Jones Racing	Ford
34	Logan Misuraca	City Garage Motorsports	Ford
36	Ryan Huff	Ryan Huff Motorsports	Ford
41	Robbie Kennealy	Jan's Towing Racing	Ford
48	Brad Smith	Brad Smith Motorsports	Ford
55	Isabella Robusto	Nitro Motorsports	Toyota
66	Derek White	MBM Motorsports	Ford
69	Will Kimmel	Kimmel Racing	Toyota
70	Thomas Annunziata	Nitro Motorsports	Toyota
71	Andy Jankowiak	KLAS Motorsports	Chevrolet
75	Bryan Dauzat	Brother-In-Law Racing	Chevrolet
77	Taylor Reimer	Pinnacle Racing Group	Chevrolet
79	Steve Lewis Jr.	Steve Lewis Racing	Chevrolet
86	Jeff Maconi (R)	Clubb Racing Inc.	Ford
88	A. J. Moyer	Moyer–Petroniro Racing	Chevrolet
89	Bobby Dale Earnhardt	Rise Racing	Chevrolet
91	Ryan Vargas	Maples Motorsports	Ford
93	Alli Owens	Costner Motorsports	Chevrolet
97	Jason Kitzmiller	CR7 Motorsports	Chevrolet
99	Michael Maples	Maples Motorsports	Chevrolet
Official entry list

== Practice ==
Practice was held on Friday, April 24, at 2:30 PM CST, and lasted for 1 hour. For practice, drivers were separated into different groups and had six laps to set a fastest time.

Gus Dean, driving for Nitro Motorsports, set the fastest time in the session, with a lap of 52.349 seconds, and a speed of 182.926 miles per hour (294.391 km/h).

=== Practice results ===
Pos.	#	Driver	Team	Make	Time	Speed
1	25	Gus Dean	Nitro Motorsports	Toyota	52.349	182.926
2	20	Jake Bollman (R)	Nitro Motorsports	Toyota	52.367	182.863
3	15	Jake Finch	Nitro Motorsports	Toyota	52.374	182.839
Full practice results

== Starting lineup ==
No qualifying session was held. Positions 1–36 was determined by 2026 owners' points, with the final four spots being determined by group practice speeds. As a result, Gio Ruggiero, driving for Joe Gibbs Racing, was awarded the pole.

Nick White was the only driver who failed to qualify.

=== Starting lineup ===
Pos.	#	Driver	Team	Make
1	18	Gio Ruggiero	Joe Gibbs Racing	Toyota
2	20	Jake Bollman (R)	Nitro Motorsports	Toyota
3	28	Jack Wood	Pinnacle Racing Group	Chevrolet
4	97	Jason Kitzmiller	CR7 Motorsports	Chevrolet
5	91	Ryan Vargas	Maples Motorsports	Ford
6	77	Taylor Reimer	Pinnacle Racing Group	Chevrolet
7	70	Thomas Annunziata	Nitro Motorsports	Toyota
8	99	Michael Maples	Maples Motorsports	Chevrolet
9	24	Daniel Dye	SPS Racing	Ford
10	71	Andy Jankowiak	KLAS Motorsports	Chevrolet
11	17	Monty Tipton	Cook Racing Technologies	Chevrolet
12	15	Jake Finch	Nitro Motorsports	Toyota
13	12	Takuma Koga	Fast Track Racing	Toyota
14	89	Bobby Dale Earnhardt	Rise Racing	Chevrolet
15	25	Gus Dean	Nitro Motorsports	Toyota
16	41	Robbie Kennealy	Jan's Towing Racing	Ford
17	11	Bryce Haugeberg	Fast Track Racing	Toyota
18	0	George Siciliano	Rette Jones Racing	Ford
19	03	Alex Clubb	Clubb Racing Inc.	Ford
20	30	Garrett Mitchell	Rette Jones Racing	Ford
21	55	Isabella Robusto	Nitro Motorsports	Toyota
22	10	Ed Pompa	Fast Track Racing	Chevrolet
23	01	Cody Dennison	Fast Track Racing	Ford
24	19	Matt Kemp	Maples Motorsports	Chevrolet
25	48	Brad Smith	Brad Smith Motorsports	Ford
26	06	Con Nicolopoulos	Wayne Peterson Motorsports	Chevrolet
27	66	Derek White	MBM Motorsports	Ford
28	1	Andrew Patterson	Maples Motorsports	Chevrolet
29	79	Steve Lewis Jr.	Steve Lewis Racing	Chevrolet
30	86	Jeff Maconi (R)	Clubb Racing Inc.	Ford
31	34	Logan Misuraca	City Garage Motorsports	Ford
32	88	A. J. Moyer	Moyer–Petroniro Racing	Chevrolet
33	69	Will Kimmel	Kimmel Racing	Toyota
34	7	Eric Caudell	CCM Racing	Toyota
35	27	Tim Richmond	Tim Richmond Racing	Toyota
36	75	Bryan Dauzat	Brother-In-Law Racing	Chevrolet
37	36	Ryan Huff	Ryan Huff Motorsports	Ford
38	26	Ron Vandermeir Jr.	Vanco Racing	Toyota
39	8	Sean Corr	Empire Racing	Chevrolet
40	93	Alli Owens	Costner Motorsports	Chevrolet
Failed to qualify
41	22	Nick White	White Motorsports	Chevrolet
Official starting lineup

== Race ==
=== Race results ===
Laps: 76

Fin	St	#	Driver	Team	Make	Laps	Led	Status	Pts
1	10	71	Andy Jankowiak	KLAS Motorsports	Chevrolet	76	1	Running	47
2	20	30	Garrett Mitchell	Rette Jones Racing	Ford	76	19	Running	43
3	15	25	Gus Dean	Nitro Motorsports	Toyota	76	0	Running	41
4	21	55	Isabella Robusto	Nitro Motorsports	Toyota	76	6	Running	41
5	1	18	Gio Ruggiero	Joe Gibbs Racing	Toyota	76	45	Running	41
6	6	77	Taylor Reimer	Pinnacle Racing Group	Chevrolet	76	0	Running	38
7	39	8	Sean Corr	Empire Racing	Chevrolet	76	0	Running	37
8	5	91	Ryan Vargas	Maples Motorsports	Ford	76	0	Running	36
9	3	28	Jack Wood	Pinnacle Racing Group	Chevrolet	76	0	Running	35
10	9	24	Daniel Dye	SPS Racing	Ford	76	0	Running	34
11	33	69	Will Kimmel	Kimmel Racing	Toyota	76	0	Running	33
12	12	15	Jake Finch	Nitro Motorsports	Toyota	76	0	Running	32
13	23	01	Cody Dennison	Fast Track Racing	Ford	76	0	Running	31
14	13	12	Takuma Koga	Fast Track Racing	Toyota	76	0	Running	30
15	27	66	Derek White	MBM Motorsports	Ford	76	0	Running	29
16	22	10	Ed Pompa	Fast Track Racing	Chevrolet	76	0	Running	28
17	31	34	Logan Misuraca	City Garage Motorsports	Ford	76	0	Running	27
18	2	20	Jake Bollman (R)	Nitro Motorsports	Toyota	75	0	Running	26
19	26	06	Con Nicolopoulos	Wayne Peterson Motorsports	Chevrolet	75	0	Running	25
20	30	86	Jeff Maconi (R)	Clubb Racing Inc.	Ford	75	0	Running	24
21	16	41	Robbie Kennealy	Jan's Towing Racing	Ford	74	0	Running	23
22	25	48	Brad Smith	Brad Smith Motorsports	Ford	74	0	Running	22
23	24	19	Matt Kemp	Maples Motorsports	Chevrolet	72	0	Running	21
24	38	26	Ron Vandermeir Jr.	Vanco Racing	Toyota	70	0	Accident	20
25	8	99	Michael Maples	Maples Motorsports	Chevrolet	70	0	Running	19
26	7	70	Thomas Annunziata	Nitro Motorsports	Toyota	69	0	Accident	18
27	17	11	Bryce Haugeberg	Fast Track Racing	Toyota	69	0	Accident	17
28	28	1	Andrew Patterson	Maples Motorsports	Chevrolet	69	0	Accident	16
29	18	0	George Siciliano	Rette Jones Racing	Ford	69	0	Accident	15
30	37	36	Ryan Huff	Ryan Huff Motorsports	Ford	69	5	Accident	15
31	14	89	Bobby Dale Eannhardt	Rise Racing	Chevrolet	69	0	Accident	13
32	35	27	Tim Richmond	Tim Richmond Raciing	Toyota	69	0	Accident	12
33	4	97	Jason Kitzmiller	CR7 Motorsports	Chevrolet	69	0	Accident	11
34	19	03	Alex Clubb	Clubb Racing Inc.	Ford	67	0	Running	10
35	29	79	Steve Lewis Jr.	Steve Lewis Racing	Chevrolet	64	0	Mechanical	9
36	34	7	Eric Caudell	CCM Racing	Toyota	57	0	Accident	8
37	36	75	Bryan Dauzat	Brother-In-Law Racing	Chevrolet	57	0	Accident	7
38	11	17	Monty Tipton	Cook Racing Technologies	Chevrolet	56	0	Mechanical	6
39	32	88	A. J. Moyer	Moyer–Petroniro Racing	Chevrolet	49	0	Mechanical	5
40	40	93	Alli Owens	Costner Motorsports	Chevrolet	28	0	Accident	4
Official race results

=== Race statistics ===
- Lead changes: 9 among 5 different drivers
- Cautions/Laps: 5 for 26 laps
- Red flags: 1
- Time of race: 1 hour, 54 minutes and 2 seconds
- Average speed: 105.997 miles per hour (170.586 km/h)

== Standings after the race ==
Drivers' Championship standings

	Pos	Driver	Points
	1	Jake Bollman	141
2	2	Gio Ruggiero	136 (–5)
	3	Ryan Vargas	133 (–8)
4	4	Andy Jankowiak	130 (–11)
2	5	Daniel Dye	118 (–23)
4	6	Jason Kitzmiller	114 (–27)
2	7	Thomas Annunziata	112 (–29)
1	8	Robbie Kennealy	105 (–36)
1	9	Takuma Koga	104 (–37)
4	10	Michael Maples	103 (–38)

- Note: Only the first 10 positions are included for the driver standings.

Previous race: 2026 Tide 150	ARCA Menards Series; 2026 season	Next race: 2026 General Tire 100 at The Glen
