= 2026 Sunset Hill Shooting Range 150 =

ARCA Menards Series race at Pocono Raceway

Race details
- Race 8 of 20 in the 2026 ARCA Menards Series
- Date: June 12, 2026
- Location: Pocono Raceway in Blakeslee, Pennsylvania
- Course: Permanent racing facility
- Course length: 2.5 miles (4.0 km)
- Distance: 60 laps, 150 mi (241.402 km)
- Average speed: 118.421 miles per hour (190.580 km/h)

Pole position
| Driver | Lanie Buice | Pinnacle Racing Group |
- Time: 54.024

Most laps led
| Driver | Gio Ruggiero | Joe Gibbs Racing |
- Laps: 51

Fastest lap
| Driver | Gio Ruggiero | Joe Gibbs Racing |
- Time: 55.334

Winner
| No. 18 | Gio Ruggiero | Joe Gibbs Racing |

Television in the United States
- Network: FS1
- Announcers: Eric Brennan and Phil Parsons

Radio in the United States
- Radio: MRN
- Booth announcers: Alex Hayden and Mike Bagley
- Turn announcers: Dave Moody (1), Tim Catalfamo (2), Kurt Becker (3)

The 2026 Sunset Hill Shooting Range 150 was an ARCA Menards Series race held on Friday, June 12, 2026, at Pocono Raceway in Blakeslee, Pennsylvania. Contested over 60 laps on the 2.5-mile (4.0 km) oval, it was the eighth race of the 2026 ARCA Menards Series season, and the 39th running of the event after a two-year hiatus.

Gio Ruggiero, driving for Joe Gibbs Racing, put on a blistering performance, leading a race-high 51 laps after starting second to earn his fourth career ARCA Menards Series win, and his fourth of the season. Ruggiero won the race by 14.342 seconds, the largest margin of victory in the series since Brent Crews at Springfield in 2023. Gavan Boschele finished second, and Carson Brown finished third. Jake Bollman and Lanie Buice rounded out the top five, while Thomas Annunziata, Daniel Dye, Jade Avedisian, Jason Kitzmiller, and Ryan Vargas rounded out the top ten.

== Report ==
=== Background ===
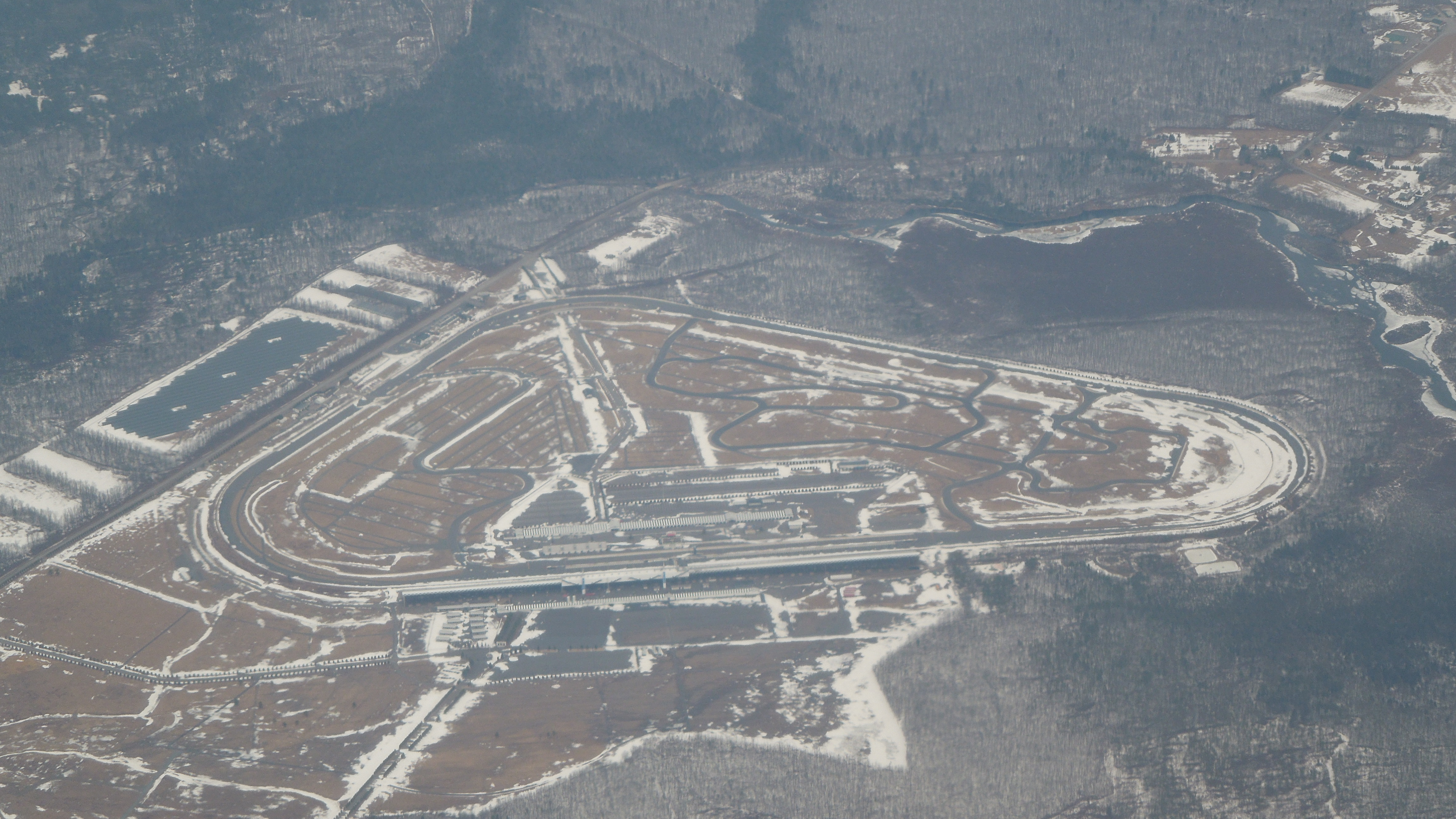
Pocono Raceway, the track where the race will be held.

Pocono Raceway is a 2.5-mile (4.0 km) oval speedway located in Blakeslee, Pennsylvania, which has hosted NASCAR racing annually since the early 1970s. Nicknamed "The Tricky Triangle", the speedway has three distinct corners and is known for high speeds along its lengthy straightaways.

From 1982 to 2019, the circuit had two race weekends. In 2020, the circuit was reduced to one race meeting of two races. The first race was moved to World Wide Technology Raceway near St. Louis starting in 2022.

==== Entry list ====
- (R) denotes rookie driver.

| # | Driver | Team | Make |
|---|---|---|---|
| 03 | Alex Clubb | Clubb Racing Inc. | Ford |
| 06 | Brayton Laster | Wayne Peterson Motorsports | Chevrolet |
| 8 | Sean Corr | Empire Racing | Chevrolet |
| 10 | Ed Pompa | Fast Track Racing | Chevrolet |
| 11 | Dustin Hillenburg | Fast Track Racing | Ford |
| 12 | Takuma Koga | Fast Track Racing | Toyota |
| 15 | Jade Avedisian | Nitro Motorsports | Toyota |
| 18 | Gio Ruggiero | Joe Gibbs Racing | Toyota |
| 20 | Jake Bollman (R) | Nitro Motorsports | Toyota |
| 22 | Nick White | White Motorsports | Chevrolet |
| 24 | Daniel Dye | SPS Racing | Chevrolet |
| 25 | Gavan Boschele (R) | Nitro Motorsports | Toyota |
| 28 | Carson Brown (R) | Pinnacle Racing Group | Chevrolet |
| 48 | Brad Smith | Brad Smith Motorsports | Ford |
| 55 | Isabella Robusto | Nitro Motorsports | Toyota |
| 66 | Dystany Spurlock | MBM Motorsports | Ford |
| 70 | Thomas Annunziata | Nitro Motorsports | Toyota |
| 77 | Lanie Buice | Pinnacle Racing Group | Chevrolet |
| 79 | Isaac Kitzmiller | ACR Motorsports | Chevrolet |
| 86 | Jeff Maconi (R) | Clubb Racing Inc. | Ford |
| 89 | Bobby Dale Earnhardt | Rise Racing | Chevrolet |
| 91 | Ryan Vargas | Maples Motorsports | Ford |
| 97 | Jason Kitzmiller | CR7 Motorsports | Chevrolet |
| 99 | Michael Maples | Maples Motorsports | Chevrolet |
Official entry list

== Practice ==
The first and only practice session was held on Friday, June 12, at 12:00 PM EST, and lasted for 45 minutes.

Gavan Boschele, driving for Nitro Motorsports, set the fastest time in the session, with a lap of 54.185 seconds, and a speed of 166.098 miles per hour (267.309 km/h).

=== Practice results ===
| Pos. | # | Driver | Team | Make | Time | Speed |
|---|---|---|---|---|---|---|
| 1 | 25 | Gavan Boschele (R) | Nitro Motorsports | Toyota | 54.185 | 166.098 |
| 2 | 77 | Lanie Buice | Pinnacle Racing Group | Chevrolet | 54.199 | 166.055 |
| 3 | 70 | Thomas Annunziata | Nitro Motorsports | Toyota | 54.343 | 165.615 |
Full practice results

== Qualifying ==
Qualifying was held on Friday, June 12, at 1:00 PM EST. The qualifying procedure used was a multi-car, multi-lap based system. All drivers were on track for a 20-minute timed session, and whoever set the fastest time in that session won the pole.

Lanie Buice, driving for Pinnacle Racing Group, qualified on pole position with a lap of 54.024 seconds, and a speed of 166.593 miles per hour (268.105 km/h).

=== Qualifying results ===
| Pos. | # | Driver | Team | Make | Time | Speed |
|---|---|---|---|---|---|---|
| 1 | 77 | Lanie Buice | Pinnacle Racing Group | Chevrolet | 54.024 | 166.593 |
| 2 | 18 | Gio Ruggiero | Joe Gibbs Racing | Toyota | 54.158 | 166.180 |
| 3 | 25 | Gavan Boschele (R) | Nitro Motorsports | Toyota | 54.444 | 165.307 |
| 4 | 24 | Daniel Dye | SPS Racing | Chevrolet | 54.523 | 165.068 |
| 5 | 28 | Carson Brown (R) | Pinnacle Racing Group | Chevrolet | 54.641 | 164.711 |
| 6 | 70 | Thomas Annunziata | Nitro Motorsports | Toyota | 54.908 | 163.911 |
| 7 | 55 | Isabella Robusto | Nitro Motorsports | Toyota | 55.297 | 162.757 |
| 8 | 20 | Jake Bollman (R) | Nitro Motorsports | Toyota | 55.399 | 162.458 |
| 9 | 15 | Jade Avedisian | Nitro Motorsports | Toyota | 55.758 | 161.412 |
| 10 | 79 | Isaac Kitzmiller | ACR Motorsports | Chevrolet | 55.987 | 160.752 |
| 11 | 97 | Jason Kitzmiller | CR7 Motorsports | Chevrolet | 56.698 | 158.736 |
| 12 | 66 | Dystany Spurlock | MBM Motorsports | Ford | 57.091 | 157.643 |
| 13 | 8 | Sean Corr | Empire Racing | Chevrolet | 57.142 | 157.502 |
| 14 | 12 | Takuma Koga | Fast Track Racing | Toyota | 58.650 | 153.453 |
| 15 | 10 | Ed Pompa | Fast Track Racing | Chevrolet | 59.076 | 152.346 |
| 16 | 06 | Brayton Laster | Wayne Peterson Motorsports | Chevrolet | 1:00.882 | 147.827 |
| 17 | 11 | Dustin Hillenburg | Fast Track Racing | Ford | 1:01.641 | 146.007 |
| 18 | 03 | Alex Clubb | Clubb Racing Inc. | Ford | 1:02.995 | 142.868 |
| 19 | 86 | Jeff Maconi (R) | Clubb Racing Inc. | Ford | 1:04.470 | 139.600 |
| 20 | 99 | Michael Maples | Maples Motorsports | Chevrolet | 1:04.834 | 138.816 |
| 21 | 91 | Ryan Vargas | Maples Motorsports | Ford | — | — |
| 22 | 89 | Bobby Dale Earnhardt | Rise Racing | Chevrolet | — | — |
| 23 | 48 | Brad Smith | Brad Smith Motorsports | Ford | — | — |
| 24 | 22 | Nick White | White Motorsports | Chevrolet | — | — |
Official qualifying results

== Race ==
=== Race results ===
Laps: 60

| Fin | St | # | Driver | Team | Make | Laps | Led | Status | Pts |
|---|---|---|---|---|---|---|---|---|---|
| 1 | 2 | 18 | Gio Ruggiero | Joe Gibbs Racing | Toyota | 60 | 51 | Running | 48 |
| 2 | 3 | 25 | Gavan Boschele (R) | Nitro Motorsports | Toyota | 60 | 0 | Running | 42 |
| 3 | 5 | 28 | Carson Brown (R) | Pinnacle Racing Group | Chevrolet | 60 | 0 | Running | 41 |
| 4 | 8 | 20 | Jake Bollman (R) | Nitro Motorsports | Toyota | 60 | 0 | Running | 40 |
| 5 | 1 | 77 | Lanie Buice | Pinnacle Racing Group | Chevrolet | 60 | 1 | Running | 41 |
| 6 | 6 | 70 | Thomas Annunziata | Nitro Motorsports | Toyota | 60 | 0 | Running | 38 |
| 7 | 4 | 24 | Daniel Dye | SPS Racing | Chevrolet | 60 | 6 | Running | 38 |
| 8 | 9 | 15 | Jade Avedisian | Nitro Motorsports | Toyota | 60 | 0 | Running | 36 |
| 9 | 11 | 97 | Jason Kitzmiller | CR7 Motorsports | Chevrolet | 60 | 0 | Running | 35 |
| 10 | 21 | 91 | Ryan Vargas | Maples Motorsports | Ford | 60 | 2 | Running | 35 |
| 11 | 10 | 79 | Isaac Kitzmiller | ACR Motorsports | Chevrolet | 60 | 0 | Running | 33 |
| 12 | 14 | 12 | Takuma Koga | Fast Track Racing | Toyota | 59 | 0 | Running | 32 |
| 13 | 7 | 55 | Isabella Robusto | Nitro Motorsports | Toyota | 58 | 0 | Running | 31 |
| 14 | 15 | 10 | Ed Pompa | Fast Track Racing | Chevrolet | 58 | 0 | Running | 30 |
| 15 | 18 | 03 | Alex Clubb | Clubb Racing Inc. | Ford | 56 | 0 | Running | 29 |
| 16 | 19 | 86 | Jeff Maconi (R) | Clubb Racing Inc. | Ford | 56 | 0 | Running | 28 |
| 17 | 16 | 06 | Brayton Laster | Wayne Peterson Motorsports | Chevrolet | 54 | 0 | Running | 27 |
| 18 | 20 | 99 | Michael Maples | Maples Motorsports | Chevrolet | 53 | 0 | Running | 26 |
| 19 | 13 | 8 | Sean Corr | Empire Racing | Chevrolet | 16 | 0 | Mechanical | 25 |
| 20 | 17 | 11 | Dustin Hillenburg | Fast Track Racing | Ford | 14 | 0 | Mechanical | 24 |
| 21 | 24 | 22 | Nick White | White Motorsports | Chevrolet | 12 | 0 | Mechanical | 23 |
| 22 | 23 | 48 | Brad Smith | Brad Smith Motorsports | Ford | 7 | 0 | Mechanical | 22 |
| 23 | 22 | 89 | Bobby Dale Earnhardt | Rise Racing | Chevrolet | 4 | 0 | Accident | 21 |
| 24 | 12 | 66 | Dystany Spurlock | MBM Motorsports | Ford | 3 | 0 | Accident | 20 |
Official race results

=== Race statistics ===
- Lead changes: 4 among 3 different drivers
- Cautions/Laps: 3 for 13 laps
- Red flags: 0
- Time of race: 1 hour, 16 minutes and 0 seconds
- Average speed: 118.421 miles per hour (190.580 km/h)

== Standings after the race ==
Drivers' Championship standings

| | Pos | Driver | Points |
|---|---|---|---|
| | 1 | Jake Bollman | 348 |
| | 2 | Thomas Annunziata | 321 (–27) |
| | 3 | Ryan Vargas | 315 (–33) |
| 1 | 4 | Isabella Robusto | 288 (–60) |
| 1 | 5 | Jason Kitzmiller | 278 (–70) |
| 1 | 6 | Takuma Koga | 264 (–84) |
| 3 | 7 | Andy Jankowiak | 263 (–85) |
| | 8 | Michael Maples | 249 (–99) |
| 2 | 9 | Gio Ruggiero | 231 (–117) |
| | 10 | Alex Clubb | 224 (–124) |

- Note: Only the first 10 positions are included for the driver standings.

| Previous race: 2026 Henry Ford Health 200 | ARCA Menards Series; 2026 season | Next race: 2026 Herr's Snacks 200 |
