= Derek White (racing driver) =

Canadian racing driver (born 1970)

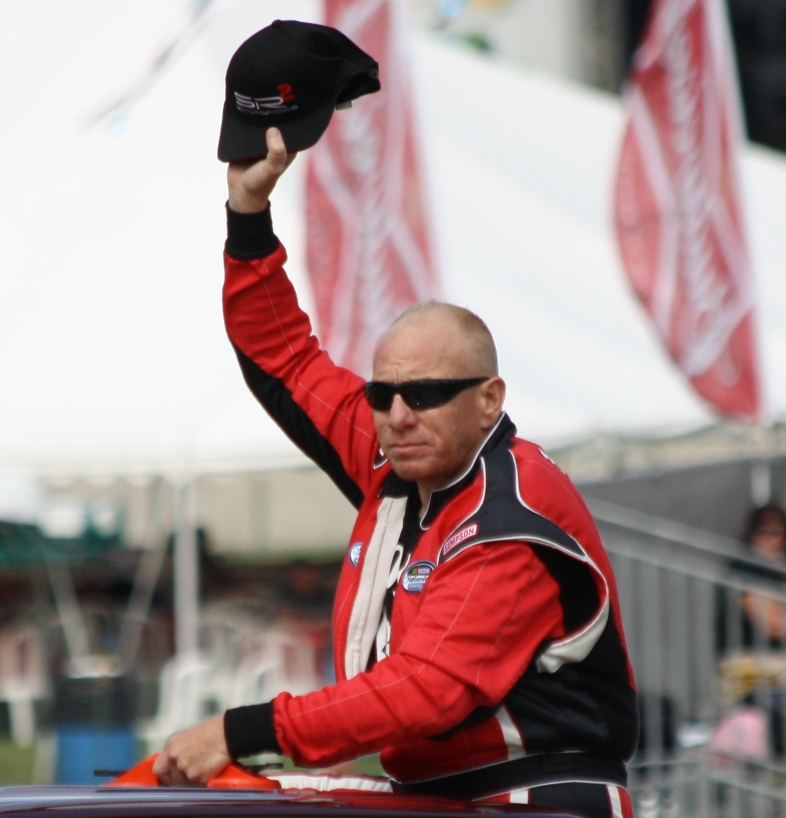
- White at Road America in 2013
- Born: December 9, 1970 (age 55); Kahnawake, Quebec, Canada
- Awards: 2010 NASCAR Canadian Tire Series Rookie of the Year

NASCAR Cup Series career
- 1 race run over 1 year
- 2015 position: 73rd
- Best finish: 73rd (2015)
- First race: 2015 5-hour Energy 301 (New Hampshire)
Wins	Top tens	Poles
0	0	0

NASCAR O'Reilly Auto Parts Series career
- 23 races run over 6 years
- 2026 position: 64th
- Best finish: 36th (2015)
- First race: 2012 NAPA Auto Parts 200 (Montreal)
- Last race: 2026 Mission 200 at The Glen (Watkins Glen)
Wins	Top tens	Poles
0	0	0

NASCAR FedEx Freight Truck Series career
- 10 races run over 6 years
- 2026 position: 90th
- Best finish: 50th (2025)
- First race: 2009 Kroger 200 (Martinsville)
- Last race: 2026 OnlyBulls Green Flag 150 (St. Petersburg)
Wins	Top tens	Poles
0	0	0

NASCAR Canada Series career
- 36 races run over 7 years
- 2014 position: 34th
- Best finish: 14th (2010)
- First race: 2009 Tufoil 250 (Saint-Eustache)
- Last race: 2015 Lucas Oil National 250 presented by Lacroix Tuning (Saint-Eustache)
Wins	Top tens	Poles
0	2	0

ARCA Menards Series career
- 3 races run over 2 years
- Best finish: 93rd (2026)
- First race: 2025 Henry Ford Health 200 (Michigan)
- Last race: 2026 Alabama Manufactured Housing 200 (Talladega)
Wins	Top tens	Poles
0	0	0
- Statistics up to date as of November 7, 2026.

Derek White (born December 9, 1970) is a Canadian professional stock car racing driver. He last competed part-time in the NASCAR O'Reilly Auto Parts Series, driving the No. 53 Chevrolet Camaro for Joey Gase Motorsports with Scott Osteen, part-time in the NASCAR Craftsman Truck Series, driving the No. 69 Ford F-150/Ram 1500 for MBM Motorsports, and part-time in the ARCA Menards Series, driving the No. 66 Ford for MBM. He has previously competed in the NASCAR Canadian Tire Series.

In March 2016, White was arrested and charged with smuggling tobacco from the United States into Canada, and was suspended indefinitely by NASCAR a few days later. He was eventually reinstated by NASCAR after the Canadian Superior Court overturned his case.

== Racing career ==
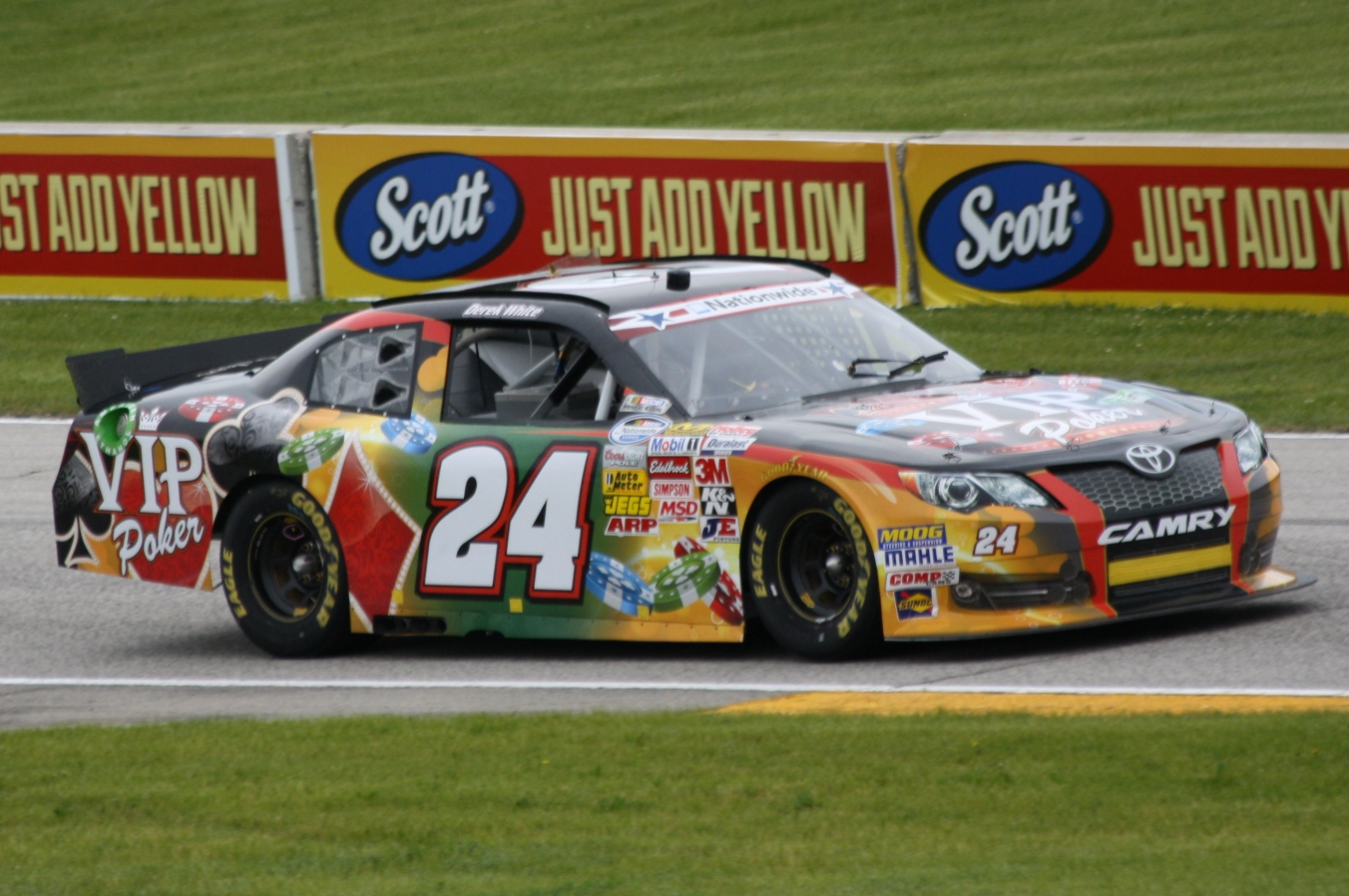
White's No. 24 at Road America in 2013

=== Early career and regional stock car racing ===
White spent thirty years drag racing in Canada before deciding to switch to stock car racing in 2009. That year, he ran five races in the NASCAR Canadian Tire Series, with a best finish of eleventh in his series debut at Autodrome Saint-Eustache. The following year, he ran eleven of thirteen races, recording a top-ten at the season-opener at Delaware Speedway. At the end of the year, he was named Rookie of the Year.

In 2014, White made a start in the American Canadian Tour, competing in the season-ending race at Airborne Speedway; he finished 22nd after starting 33rd.

=== National series ===
In 2009, White made his Camping World Truck Series debut for Mario Gosselin at Martinsville Speedway, finishing 23rd after starting 34th.

In 2012, White was hired by SR² Motorsports to run as a road course ringer for the Nationwide Series race at Circuit Gilles Villeneuve. In the No. 24, he finished a career-high eighteenth. Before the 2014 Drive to Stop Diabetes 300 at Bristol Motor Speedway, White formed Motorsports Business Management with driver Carl Long as principal. The team made its racing debut as MBM Motorsports at the race with Matt Carter as driver of the No. 13. For six more races in 2014, White fielded rides for himself, Long and Mike Wallace, failing to qualify for four and not finishing all six races they had qualified.

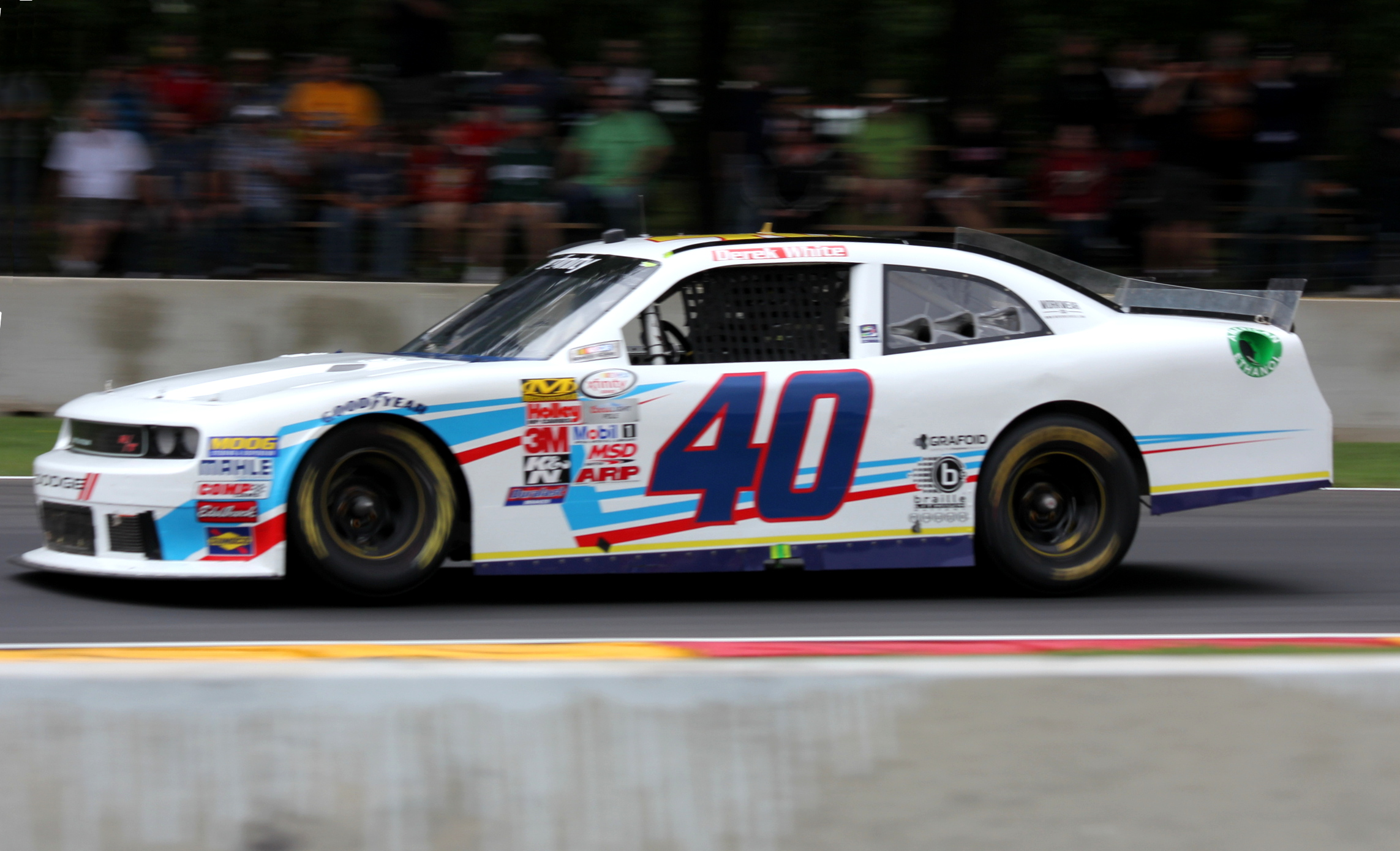
White turning left at Road America in 2015

In 2015, White and Long were joined by team owners Rick Ware and Curtis Key as partners, and the team eventually added the No. 40 team. Before the Winn-Dixie 300 at Talladega Superspeedway, White was penalized 15 drivers and owners points for an unsecured ballast.

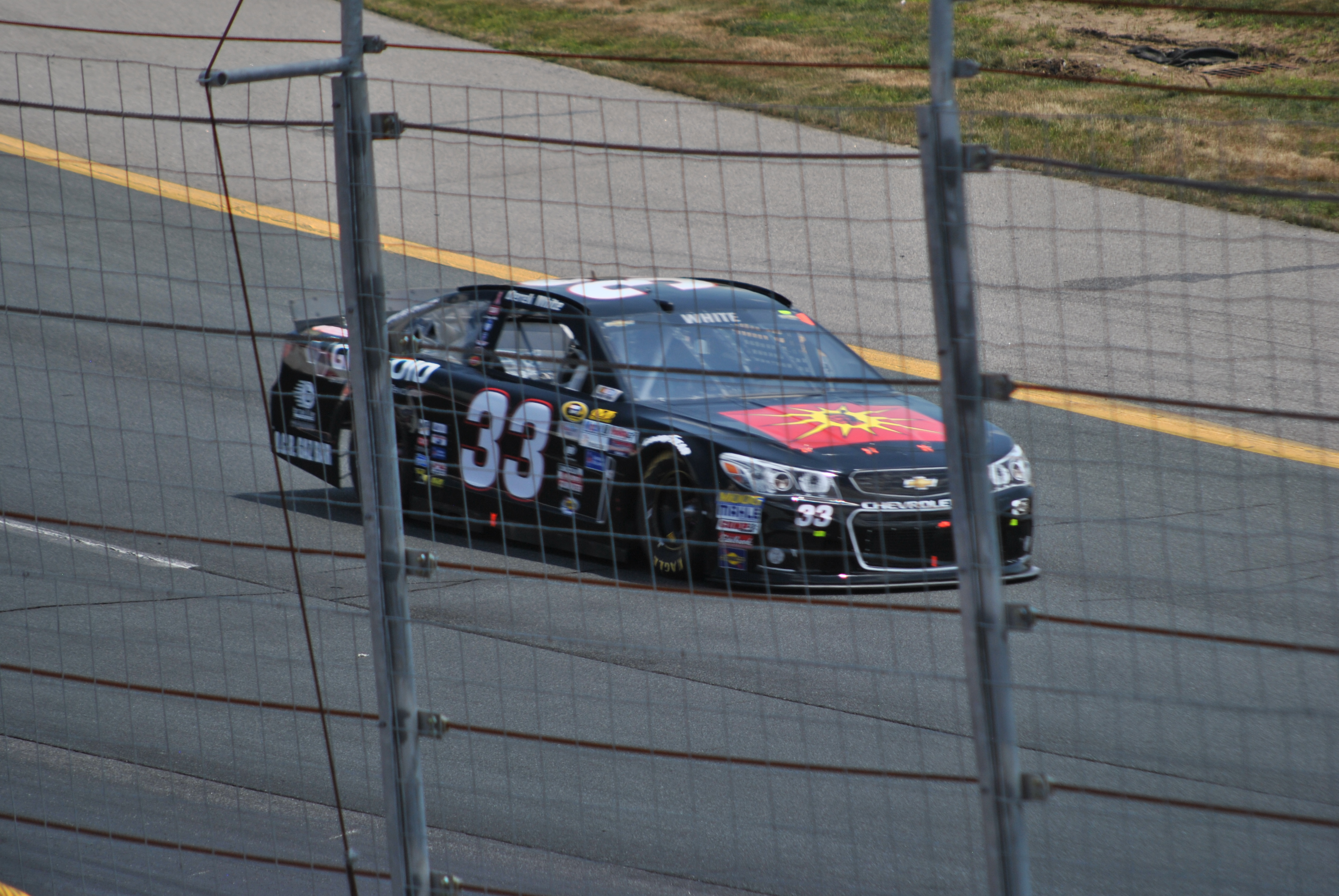
White racing in his Cup debut at New Hampshire Motor Speedway in 2015

On July 13, White announced that he would make his Sprint Cup Series debut at the 5-hour Energy 301 in Loudon for Circle Sport, the first Native American to attempt a Cup Series race in series history. After qualifying 42nd, he finished 39th, eleven laps down.

In 2025, it was revealed that White would return to NASCAR, this time in the NASCAR Craftsman Truck Series at North Wilkesboro Speedway, driving the No. 2 Ford for Reaume Brothers Racing. After starting in 26th due to qualifying being cancelled to due inclement weather, he went on to finish in 33rd after failing to maintain minimum speed shortly after the halfway point of the race. A few weeks later, it was revealed that White will make his debut in the ARCA Menards Series at Michigan International Speedway, driving the No. 31 Toyota for Rise Motorsports. He also drove the No. 69 MBM Motorsports Ford for the race at Watkins Glen, and he obtained his first top-twenty finish, that being he finished nineteenth.

== Personal life ==
From Kahnawake, Quebec, White is of Mohawk descent.

On March 30, 2016, White turned himself in for his involvement in a tobacco smuggling ring. The circle, targeted by Sûreté du Québec's MYGALE project, began in 2014 and had smuggled at least 158 transports to Canada, including 2,294 tons of tobacco worth $530 million. The tobacco was then sold to First Nations persons in the country. On April 4, he was indefinitely suspended by NASCAR.

In 2019, White was acquitted on one of the two charges of fraud and conspiracy to commit fraud. However, he was found guilty of fraud, conspiracy to commit fraud, and profiting from organized crime for not paying excise tax on tobacco that was imported from the United States. He appealed, and on 1 November 2023, convictions against White and another accused were overturned. They had argued that the Excise Tax Act tariffs on imports were not applicable to Mohawk people based on their Constitution Act Section 35 rights, as well as the United Nations Declaration on the Rights of Indigenous Peoples rights to trade tobacco tax-free. They argued that the Mohawk nation has the right to control its economy based on the exercise of treaty rights from 1664 through to 1764.

== Motorsports career results ==
=== NASCAR ===
(key) (Bold – Pole position awarded by qualifying time. Italics – Pole position earned by points standings or practice time. * – Most laps led.)

==== Sprint Cup Series ====
NASCAR Sprint Cup Series results
Year	Team	No.	Make	1	2	3	4	5	6	7	8	9	10	11	12	13	14	15	16	17	18	19	20	21	22	23	24	25	26	27	28	29	30	31	32	33	34	35	36	NSCC	Pts	Ref
2015	Circle Sport	33	Chevy	DAY	ATL	LVS	PHO	CAL	MAR	TEX	BRI	RCH	TAL	KAN	CLT	DOV	POC	MCH	SON	DAY	KEN	NHA; 39	IND	POC	GLN	MCH	BRI	DAR	RCH	CHI	NHA	DOV	CLT	KAN	TAL	MAR	TEX	PHO	HOM	73rd	0^{1}	

==== O'Reilly Auto Parts Series ====
NASCAR O'Reilly Auto Parts Series results
Year	Team	No.	Make	1	2	3	4	5	6	7	8	9	10	11	12	13	14	15	16	17	18	19	20	21	22	23	24	25	26	27	28	29	30	31	32	33	NOAPSC	Pts	Ref
2012	SR² Motorsports	00	Chevy	DAY	PHO	LVS	BRI	CAL	TEX	RCH	TAL	DAR	IOW	CLT	DOV	MCH	ROA	KEN	DAY	NHA	CHI	IND	IOW	GLN; DNQ													52nd	64	
2012	SR² Motorsports	24	Chevy																						CGV; 18	BRI	ATL										52nd	64	
2012	SR² Motorsports	24	Toyota																									RCH; 34	CHI	KEN	DOV	CLT	KAN; 34	TEX	PHO; 29	HOM	52nd	64	
2013	SR² Motorsports	24	Toyota	DAY	PHO	LVS	BRI	CAL	TEX	RCH	TAL	DAR	CLT	DOV	IOW	MCH	ROA; 36	KEN	DAY	NHA	CHI	IND	IOW	GLN; 25	MOH	BRI	ATL	RCH	CHI	KEN	DOV	KAN	CLT	TEX	PHO	HOM	71st	27	
2014	JGL Racing	28	Dodge	DAY	PHO	LVS	BRI	CAL	TEX; 36	DAR																											117th	0^{1}	
2014	MBM Motorsports	13	Toyota								RCH; 34	TAL	IOW	CLT	DOV	MCH	ROA	KEN	DAY	NHA	CHI	IND	IOW	GLN	MOH	BRI	ATL	RCH	CHI	KEN	DOV	KAN	CLT	TEX	PHO	HOM	117th	0^{1}	
2015	MBM Motorsports	40	Dodge	DAY; 22	ATL		PHO; 39		TEX; 39	BRI; 40	RCH	TAL; 26	IOW	CLT	DOV	MCH	CHI	DAY; DNQ								ROA; 38	DAR	RCH	CHI; 37	KEN	DOV	CLT	KAN				36th	126	
2015	MBM Motorsports	13	Toyota			LVS; 28		CAL; 33											KEN; 36																		36th	126	
2015	MBM Motorsports	13	Dodge																	NHA; 27	IND	IOW	GLN	MOH	BRI											HOM; 35	36th	126	
2015	MBM Motorsports	13	Chevy																															TEX; 31	PHO		36th	126	
2016	MBM Motorsports	40	Dodge	DAY; DNQ	ATL																																78th	5	
2016	MBM Motorsports	13	Dodge			LVS; 36	PHO	CAL	TEX	BRI	RCH	TAL	DOV	CLT	POC	MCH	IOW	DAY	KEN	NHA	IND	IOW	GLN	MOH	BRI	ROA	DAR	RCH	CHI	KEN	DOV	CLT	KAN	TEX	PHO	HOM	78th	5	
2026	Joey Gase Motorsports with Scott Osteen	53	Chevy	DAY	ATL	COA	PHO	LVS	DAR	MAR	CAR	BRI	KAN	TAL	TEX	GLN; 32	DOV	CLT	NSH	POC	COR	SON	CHI	ATL	IND	IOW	DAY	DAR	GTW	BRI	LVS	CLT	PHO	TAL	MAR	HOM	64th	5	

==== Craftsman Truck Series ====
NASCAR Craftsman Truck Series results
Year	Team	No.	Make	1	2	3	4	5	6	7	8	9	10	11	12	13	14	15	16	17	18	19	20	21	22	23	24	25	NCTC	Pts	Ref
2009	DGM Racing	12	Chevy	DAY	CAL	ATL	MAR	KAN	CLT	DOV	TEX	MCH	MLW	MEM	KEN	IRP	NSH	BRI	CHI	IOW	GTW	NHA	LVS	MAR; 26	TAL	TEX	PHO; 24		71st	176	
2009	DGM Racing	92	Chevy																									HOM; DNQ	71st	176	
2010	White Motorsports	96	Chevy	DAY	ATL	MAR	NSH	KAN; DNQ	DOV	CLT	TEX	MCH	IOW	GTY	IRP	POC	NSH	DAR	BRI	CHI	KEN	NHA	LVS	MAR	TAL	TEX	PHO		116th	64	
2010	Rick Ware Racing	6	Chevy																									HOM; 33	116th	64	
2011	Ray Hackett Racing	76	Ford	DAY	PHO	DAR	MAR	NSH	DOV	CLT	KAN	TEX	KEN	IOW	NSH	IRP	POC	MCH	BRI	ATL	CHI	NHA	KEN	LVS	TAL	MAR	TEX; DNQ	HOM; DNQ	N/A	—	
2012	Ray Hackett Racing	76	Ford	DAY; DNQ	MAR	CAR	KAN	CLT	DOV	TEX	KEN	IOW	CHI	POC	MCH	BRI	ATL	IOW	KEN	LVS	TAL	MAR	TEX	PHO	HOM				N/A	—	
2013	SS-Green Light Racing	81	Chevy	DAY	MAR	CAR	KAN	CLT	DOV	TEX	KEN	IOW	ELD	POC	MCH	BRI	MSP; 21	IOW	CHI	LVS	TAL	MAR	TEX	PHO	HOM				103rd	0^{1}	
2014	MAKE Motorsports	50	Chevy	DAY	MAR	KAN	CLT	DOV	TEX	GTW	KEN	IOW	ELD	POC	MCH	BRI	MSP	CHI	NHA	LVS	TAL; 26	MAR	TEX	PHO					78th	18	
2014	MBM Motorsports	82	Chevy																						HOM; 27				78th	18	
2025	Reaume Brothers Racing	2	Ford	DAY	ATL	LVS	HOM	MAR	BRI	CAR	TEX	KAN	NWS; 33	CLT	NSH	MCH	POC	LRP	IRP										50th	29	
2025	MBM Motorsports	69	Ford																	GLN; 19	RCH	DAR	BRI	NHA; 30	ROV	TAL	MAR	PHO	50th	29	
2026	MBM Motorsports	69	Ford	DAY	ATL	STP; 35	DAR	CAR	BRI	TEX	GLN	DOV	CLT	NSH	MCH	COR	LRP	NWS	IRP	RCH									90th	2	
2026	MBM Motorsports	69	Ram																		NHA; DNQ	BRI	KAN	CLT	PHO	TAL	MAR	HOM	90th	2	

==== Canadian Tire Series ====
NASCAR Canadian Tire Series results
Year	Team	No.	Make	1	2	3	4	5	6	7	8	9	10	11	12	13	NCTSC	Pts	Ref
2009	White Motorsports	99	Chevy	ASE; 11	DEL	MSP	ASE; 16	MPS	EDM	SAS	MSP	CTR; 14	CGV; 33	BAR	RIS	KWA; 20	24th	533	
2010	White Motorsports	99	Chevy	DEL; 7	MSP; 17	ASE; 15	TOR; 31	EDM; 19	MPS; 17	SAS; 17		MSP; 16	CGV; 15	BAR	RIS	KWA; 19	14th	1236	
2010	White Motorsports	99	Dodge								CTR; 14						14th	1236	
2011	White Motorsports	99	Chevy	MSP; 12	ICAR; 13	DEL; 20	MSP	TOR; 16	MPS	SAS	CTR; 7	CGV; 25	BAR	RIS; 14	KWA; 26		16th	909	
2012	White Motorsports	10	Chevy	MSP; 14	ICAR; 24	MSP	DEL	MPS	EDM	SAS							27th	123	
2012	White Motorsports	99	Chevy								CTR; 14	CGV; 23	BAR	RIS	KWA; 22		27th	123	
2013	White Motorsports	99	Chevy	MSP; 28	DEL	MSP									KWA; 20		33rd	68	
2013	DJK Racing	28	Chevy				ICAR; 16	MPS	SAS	ASE	CTR	RIS	MSP	BAR			33rd	68	
2014	White Motorsports	00	Chevy	MSP; 20	ACD							MSP; 25	BAR	KWA			34th	71	
2014	White Motorsports	88	Chevy			ICAR; 16	EIR	SAS	ASE	CTR	RIS						34th	71	
2015	White Motorsports	00	Chevy	MSP	ACD	SSS	ICAR	EIR	SAS	ASE; 14	CTR	RIS	MSP	KWA			43rd	30	

=== ARCA Menards Series ===
(key) (Bold – Pole position awarded by qualifying time. Italics – Pole position earned by points standings or practice time. * – Most laps led. ** – All laps led.)

ARCA Menards Series results
Year	Team	No.	Make	1	2	3	4	5	6	7	8	9	10	11	12	13	14	15	16	17	18	19	20	AMSC	Pts	Ref
2025	Rise Motorsports	31	Toyota	DAY	PHO	TAL	KAN	CLT	MCH; 17	BLN	ELK	LRP	DOV	IRP	IOW	GLN	ISF	MAD	DSF	BRI	SLM	KAN	TOL	116th	27	
2026	MBM Motorsports	66	Ford	DAY; 39	PHO	KAN	TAL; 15	GLN	TOL	MCH	POC	BER	ELK	CHI	LRP	IRP	IOW	ISF	MAD	DSF	SLM	BRI	KAN	93rd	34	
