= 2025 General Tire 200 (Talladega) =

3rd race of the 2025 ARCA Menards Series

Race details
- Race 3 of 20 of the 2025 ARCA Menards Series
- Date: April 26, 2025
- Official name: 63rd Annual General Tire 200
- Location: Talladega Superspeedway in Lincoln, Alabama
- Course: Permanent racing facility
- Course length: 2.66 miles (4.28 km)
- Distance: 77 laps, 204.82 mi (329.626 km)
- Scheduled distance: 76 laps, 202 mi (325 km)
- Average speed: 122.565 mph (197.249 km/h)

Pole position
Driver	William Sawalich	Joe Gibbs Racing
- Grid positions set by competition-based formula

Most laps led
Driver	Lawless Alan	Venturini Motorsports
- Laps: 30

Winner
No. 20	Lawless Alan	Venturini Motorsports

Television in the United States
- Network: FS1
- Announcers: Brent Stover, Phil Parsons, and Austin Dillon

Radio in the United States
- Radio: MRN

The 2025 General Tire 200 was the 3rd stock car race of the 2025 ARCA Menards Series season, and the 63rd running of the event. The race was held on Saturday, April 26, 2025, at Talladega Superspeedway in Lincoln, Alabama, a 2.66 mile (4.28 km) permanent quad-oval shaped asphalt superspeedway. The race was scheduled to be contested over 76 laps, but was extended to 77 laps due to an overtime finish. In an action-packed race, Lawless Alan, driving for Venturini Motorsports, would take the lead in the late stages, and won the race after the caution came out on the final restart. This was Alan's first career ARCA Menards Series win. This Was Also The Final ARCA Win For Venturini Motorsports. To fill out the podium, Thad Moffitt, driving for Nitro Motorsports, and Isabella Robusto, driving for Venturini Motorsports, would finish 2nd and 3rd, respectively.

== Report ==
=== Background ===
Talladega Superspeedway, the track where the race was held.

Talladega Superspeedway, formerly known as Alabama International Motor Speedway, is a motorsports complex located north of Talladega, Alabama. It is located on the former Anniston Air Force Base in the small city of Lincoln. A tri-oval, the track was constructed in 1969 by the International Speedway Corporation, a business controlled by the France family. Talladega is most known for its steep banking. The track currently hosts NASCAR's Cup Series, Xfinity Series and Craftsman Truck Series. Talladega is the longest NASCAR oval with a length of 2.66-mile-long (4.28 km) tri-oval like the Daytona International Speedway, which is 2.5-mile-long (4.0 km).

==== Entry list ====
- (R) denotes rookie driver.

#	Driver	Team	Make	Sponsor
0	Ben Peterson	Wayne Peterson Racing	Ford	Auburn Athletics
03	Alex Clubb	Clubb Racing Inc.	Ford	Yavapai Bottle Gas / Race Parts Liquidators
06	Brayton Laster (R)	Wayne Peterson Racing	Chevrolet	Samaritan House / AM Manufacturing Company
6	Lavar Scott	Rev Racing	Chevrolet	Max Siegel Inc.
7	Eric Caudell	CCM Racing	Toyota	Coble Enterprises / CCM
9	Cody Dennison	Fast Track Racing	Toyota	AON Water Technology
10	Ed Pompa	Fast Track Racing	Ford	HYTORC of New York / Double "H" Ranch
11	Bryce Haugeberg	Fast Track Racing	Toyota	North Dakota State University / Brenco
12	Matt Kemp	Fast Track Racing	Ford	ELHDetailing.com
15	Patrick Staropoli	Venturini Motorsports	Toyota	Syfovre
18	William Sawalich	Joe Gibbs Racing	Toyota	Starkey
20	Lawless Alan	Venturini Motorsports	Toyota	AutoParkIt.com
22	Nick White	Drew White Motorsports	Chevrolet	Brooks Dockside Seafood
23	Spencer Gallagher	Sigma Performance Services	Chevrolet	SPS / Allegiant Travel Company
25	Jake Finch	Venturini Motorsports	Toyota	Phoenix Construction
27	Tim Richmond	Richmond Motorsports	Toyota	Immigration Law Center
28	Brenden Queen (R)	Pinnacle Racing Group	Chevrolet	BestRepair.net
30	Garrett Mitchell	Rette Jones Racing	Ford	Kenetik
31	Tim Goulet	Rise Motorsports	Toyota	Rise Motorsports
36	Ryan Huff	Ryan Huff Motorsports	Ford	Commonwealth Equipment
46	Thad Moffitt	Nitro Motorsports	Toyota	Induction Innovations
48	Brad Smith	Brad Smith Motorsports	Ford	Gary's Speed Shop
55	Isabella Robusto (R)	Venturini Motorsports	Toyota	Mobil 1
57	Hunter Deshautelle	Brother-In-Law Racing	Chevrolet	O. B. Builders
62	Steve Lewis Jr.	Steve Lewis Racing	Chevrolet	SmartGrid Integrations / Michael Waltrip Brewing
67	Ryan Roulette	Maples Motorsports	Ford	VFW / Maples Motorsports
68	Scott Melton	Kimmel Racing	Ford	Melton-McFadden Insurance Agency
69	Nolan Wilson	Kimmel Racing	Ford	Nucleus Events / Knight Operations
70	Amber Balcaen	Nitro Motorsports	Toyota	ICON Direct / AskAmber.io
73	Andy Jankowiak	KLAS Motorsports	Chevrolet	KLAS Motorsports
75	Bryan Dauzat	Brother-In-Law Racing	Chevrolet	O. B. Builders
76	Kole Raz (R)	AM Racing	Ford	Cyclum Nextgen Travel Centers
86	Becca Monopoli	City Garage Motorsports	Ford	Baptist Health
88	A. J. Moyer	Moyer-Petroniro Racing	Chevrolet	River's Edge Cottages & RV Park
93	Caleb Costner	CW Motorsports	Chevrolet	The Officer Tatum / Shinergy
97	Jason Kitzmiller	CR7 Motorsports	Chevrolet	A.L.L. Construction / Carter Cat
98	Dale Shearer	Shearer Speed Racing	Toyota	Shearer Speed Racing
99	Michael Maples	Maples Motorsports	Chevrolet	Don Ray Petroleum / Maples Motorsports
Official entry list

== Practice ==
Practice was held on Friday, April 25, at 3:00 PM CST, and would last for 1 hour. For practice, drivers were separated into different groups and had six laps to set a fastest time. William Sawalich, driving for Joe Gibbs Racing, would set the fastest time between the groups, with a lap of 53.142, and a speed of 180.196 mph (289.997 km/h).

Pos.	#	Driver	Team	Make	Time	Speed
1	18	William Sawalich	Joe Gibbs Racing	Toyota	53.142	180.196
2	6	Lavar Scott	Rev Racing	Chevrolet	53.155	180.152
3	73	Andy Jankowiak	KLAS Motorsports	Chevrolet	53.168	180.108
Full practice results

== Starting lineup ==
No qualifying session will be held, instead, the starting lineup will be determined by owner's points from the previous season. As a result, William Sawalich, driving for Joe Gibbs Racing, will start on the pole.

=== Starting lineup ===
Pos.	#	Driver	Team	Make
1	18	William Sawalich	Joe Gibbs Racing	Toyota
2	20	Lawless Alan	Venturini Motorsports	Toyota
3	6	Lavar Scott	Rev Racing	Chevrolet
4	55	Isabella Robusto (R)	Venturini Motorsports	Toyota
5	28	Brenden Queen (R)	Pinnacle Racing Group	Chevrolet
6	25	Jake Finch	Venturini Motorsports	Toyota
7	46	Thad Moffitt	Nitro Motorsports	Toyota
8	76	Kole Raz (R)	AM Racing	Ford
9	23	Spencer Gallagher	Sigma Performance Services	Chevrolet
10	11	Bryce Haugeberg	Fast Track Racing	Toyota
11	9	Cody Dennison	Fast Track Racing	Toyota
12	12	Matt Kemp	Fast Track Racing	Ford
13	10	Ed Pompa	Fast Track Racing	Ford
14	03	Alex Clubb	Clubb Racing Inc.	Ford
15	06	Brayton Laster (R)	Wayne Peterson Racing	Chevrolet
16	31	Tim Goulet	Rise Motorsports	Toyota
17	99	Michael Maples	Maples Motorsports	Chevrolet
18	48	Brad Smith	Brad Smith Motorsports	Ford
19	73	Andy Jankowiak	KLAS Motorsports	Chevrolet
20	93	Caleb Costner	CW Motorsports	Chevrolet
21	97	Jason Kitzmiller	CR7 Motorsports	Chevrolet
22	86	Becca Monopoli	City Garage Motorsports	Ford
23	27	Tim Richmond	Richmond Motorsports	Toyota
24	30	Garrett Mitchell	Rette Jones Racing	Ford
25	69	Nolan Wilson	Kimmel Racing	Ford
26	67	Ryan Roulette	Maples Motorsports	Ford
27	70	Amber Balcaen	Nitro Motorsports	Toyota
28	98	Dale Shearer	Shearer Speed Racing	Toyota
29	0	Ben Peterson	Wayne Peterson Racing	Ford
30	68	Scott Melton	Kimmel Racing	Ford
31	7	Eric Caudell	CCM Racing	Toyota
32	88	A. J. Moyer	Moyer-Petroniro Racing	Chevrolet
33	57	Hunter Deshautelle	Brother-In-Law Racing	Chevrolet
34	75	Bryan Dauzat	Brother-In-Law Racing	Chevrolet
35	62	Steve Lewis Jr.	Steve Lewis Racing	Chevrolet
36	36	Ryan Huff	Ryan Huff Motorsports	Ford
37	15	Patrick Staropoli	Venturini Motorsports	Toyota
38	22	Nick White	Drew White Motorsports	Chevrolet
Official starting lineup

== Race results ==
Fin	St	#	Driver	Team	Make	Laps	Led	Status	Pts
1	2	20	Lawless Alan	Venturini Motorsports	Toyota	77	30	Running	48
2	7	46	Thad Moffitt	Nitro Motorsports	Toyota	77	0	Running	42
3	4	55	Isabella Robusto (R)	Venturini Motorsports	Toyota	77	0	Running	41
4	19	73	Andy Jankowiak	KLAS Motorsports	Chevrolet	77	4	Running	41
5	21	97	Jason Kitzmiller	CR7 Motorsports	Chevrolet	77	1	Running	40
6	3	6	Lavar Scott	Rev Racing	Chevrolet	77	0	Running	38
7	6	25	Jake Finch	Venturini Motorsports	Toyota	77	15	Running	38
8	10	11	Bryce Haugeberg	Fast Track Racing	Toyota	77	0	Running	36
9	1	18	William Sawalich	Joe Gibbs Racing	Toyota	77	23	Running	36
10	24	30	Garrett Mitchell	Rette Jones Racing	Ford	77	0	Running	34
11	37	15	Patrick Staropoli	Venturini Motorsports	Toyota	77	0	Running	33
12	20	93	Caleb Costner	CW Motorsports	Chevrolet	77	0	Running	32
13	33	57	Hunter Deshautelle	Brother-In-Law Racing	Chevrolet	77	0	Running	31
14	25	69	Nolan Wilson	Kimmel Racing	Ford	77	0	Running	30
15	35	62	Steve Lewis Jr.	Steve Lewis Racing	Chevrolet	76	0	Accident	29
16	27	70	Amber Balcaen	Nitro Motorsports	Toyota	76	0	Accident	28
17	30	68	Scott Melton	Kimmel Racing	Ford	76	0	Accident	27
18	34	75	Bryan Dauzat	Brother-In-Law Racing	Chevrolet	76	0	Accident	26
19	31	7	Eric Caudell	CCM Racing	Toyota	76	0	Accident	25
20	14	03	Alex Clubb	Clubb Racing Inc.	Ford	76	0	Running	24
21	26	67	Ryan Roulette	Maples Motorsports	Ford	76	4	Running	24
22	8	76	Kole Raz (R)	AM Racing	Ford	76	0	Running	22
23	9	23	Spencer Gallagher	Sigma Performance Services	Chevrolet	75	0	Running	21
24	16	31	Tim Goulet	Rise Motorsports	Toyota	75	0	Running	20
25	5	28	Brenden Queen (R)	Pinnacle Racing Group	Chevrolet	75	0	Running	19
26	18	48	Brad Smith	Brad Smith Motorsports	Ford	75	0	Running	18
27	36	36	Ryan Huff	Ryan Huff Motorsports	Ford	74	0	Running	17
28	32	88	A. J. Moyer	Moyer-Petroniro Racing	Chevrolet	73	0	Accident	16
29	28	98	Dale Shearer	Shearer Speed Racing	Toyota	72	0	Mechanical	15
30	13	10	Ed Pompa	Fast Track Racing	Ford	72	0	Running	14
31	17	99	Michael Maples	Maples Motorsports	Chevrolet	71	0	Accident	13
32	11	9	Cody Dennison	Fast Track Racing	Toyota	61	0	Accident	12
33	23	27	Tim Richmond	Richmond Motorsports	Toyota	60	0	Mechanical	11
34	15	06	Brayton Laster (R)	Wayne Peterson Racing	Chevrolet	58	0	Running	10
35	12	12	Matt Kemp	Fast Track Racing	Ford	14	0	Suspension	9
36	29	0	Ben Peterson	Wayne Peterson Racing	Ford	10	0	Quit	8
37	22	86	Becca Monopoli	City Garage Motorsports	Ford	0	0	DNS	7
38	38	22	Nick White	Drew White Motorsports	Chevrolet	0	0	DNS	6
Official race results

== Standings after the race ==
Drivers' Championship standings

	Pos	Driver	Points
1	1	Lavar Scott	118
2	2	Lawless Alan	115 (-3)
2	3	Brenden Queen	110 (–8)
1	4	Andy Jankowiak	107 (–11)
1	5	Jason Kitzmiller	98 (–20)
3	6	Kole Raz	98 (–20)
3	7	Thad Moffitt	86 (–32)
4	8	William Sawalich	80 (–37)
8	9	Isabella Robusto	77 (–41)
13	10	Bryce Haugeberg	71 (–44)

- Note: Only the first 10 positions are included for the driver standings.

Previous race: 2025 General Tire 150 (Phoenix)	ARCA Menards Series; 2025 season	Next race: 2025 Tide 150
