= Isabella Robusto =

American racing driver (born 2004)

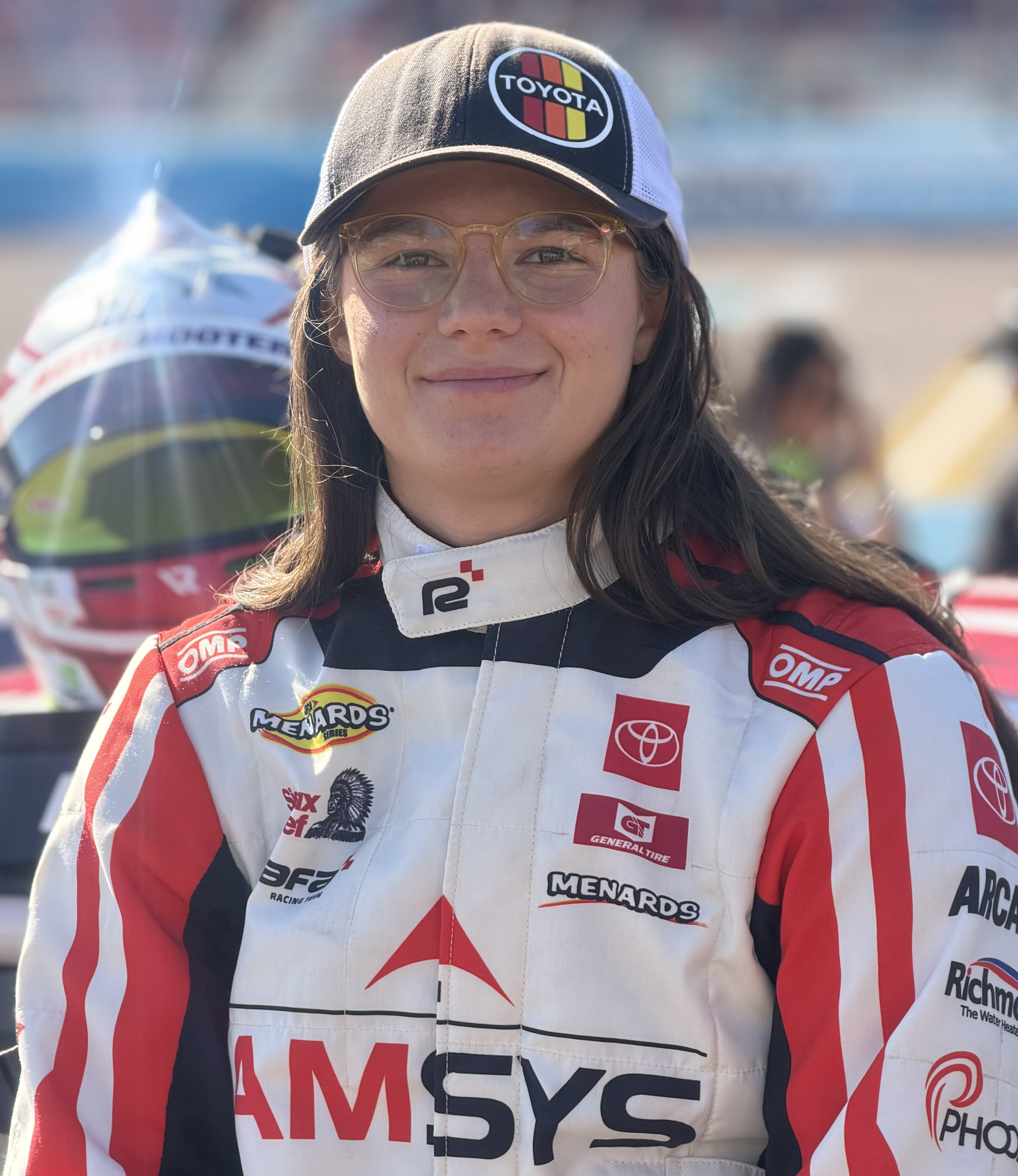
- Robusto at Phoenix Raceway in 2025
- Born: November 4, 2004 (age 22); Fort Mill, South Carolina, U.S.
- Achievements: Most top-five finishes by a female driver in the ARCA Menards Series; First female to win a Legend Car National Qualifier Event (Texas, 2018)
- Awards: 2025 ARCA Menards Series Rookie of the Year

ARCA Menards Series career
- 44 races run over 3 years
- Best finish: 3rd (2026)
- First race: 2024 General Tire 150 (Phoenix)
- Last race: 2026 Menards 150 (Kansas)
| Wins | Top tens | Poles |
|---|---|---|
| 0 | 27 | 1 |

ARCA Menards Series East career
- 9 races run over 3 years
- Best finish: 11th (2025)
- First race: 2024 Music City 150 (Nashville Fairgrounds)
- Last race: 2026 JR & CO. 150 (Iowa)
| Wins | Top tens | Poles |
|---|---|---|
| 0 | 6 | 0 |

ARCA Menards Series West career
- 9 races run over 3 years
- Best finish: 15th (2024)
- First race: 2024 General Tire 150 (Phoenix)
- Last race: 2026 General Tire 150 (Phoenix)
| Wins | Top tens | Poles |
|---|---|---|
| 0 | 4 | 0 |
- Statistics up to date as of October 16, 2026.

Isabella Robusto (born November 4, 2004) is an American professional stock car racing driver. She last competed full-time in the ARCA Menards Series, and part-time in the ARCA Menards Series East and ARCA Menards Series West, driving the No. 55 Toyota Camry for Nitro Motorsports. She has been in the TD2 driver development program system since 2021 and was a part of the Drive for Diversity program with Rev Racing from 2016 to 2021 which made her the longest lasting member of the program to date.

== Racing career ==
=== Early career ===
Robusto started her career in 2010, racing Go-Karts with her brother Will. In 2013, at the age of eight, she began racing Bandolero's at the Charlotte Motor Speedway, then in 2016 moved up to Legend Cars and scored the Young Lions division title for the state of South Carolina. In 2018, she would become the first female to win a national qualifier race in Legend Car competition.

=== Late Model Stock Cars ===
In 2020, Robusto started running in Late Model Stock Cars for Rev Racing with the NASCAR Advance Auto Parts Weekly Series on part-time basis where she scored six top-fives and fourteen top-tens. For 2021, she returned and scored five top-fives and eight top-ten's as well as a pole position.

At the end of 2021 and heading into 2022, Robusto joined the TD2 driver development program in the No. 55 for Lee Faulk Racing. She took part in 37 events, where she would score two wins, three poles, ten top-fives, and over 30 top-tens. She also raced from 30th to third in the South Carolina 400, having to hold off drivers such as Dale Earnhardt Jr. and Bryant Barnhill.

=== ARCA Menards Series ===
==== 2023 ====
On January 18, 2023, it was announced Robusto would run part-time in the ARCA Menards Series and ARCA Menards Series East in 2023. Her first scheduled race was at the Nashville in May, but she was injured with a concussion in a last lap crash at Hickory Motor Speedway just a week prior and was replaced by fellow TD2 driver Giovanni Ruggiero.

==== 2024 ====
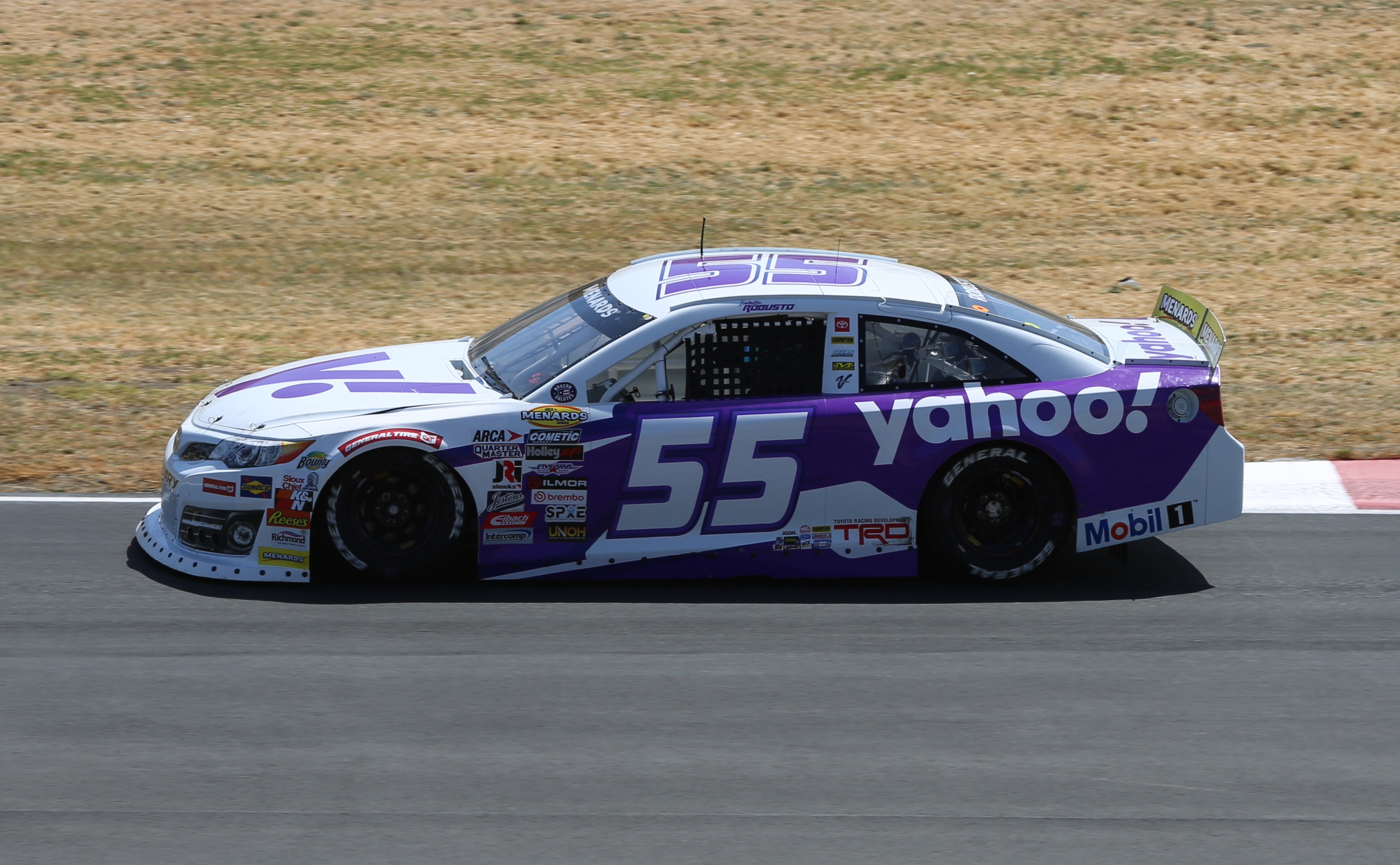
Robusto's No. 55 car at Sonoma Raceway in 2024

In 2024, Robusto would make her official ARCA Menards Series debut in the General Tire 150 at Phoenix Raceway, driving the No. 55 for Venturini Motorsports. She started and finished the race in sixth, and ran as high as third throughout parts of the race. She followed up this performance with two top-ten finishes, and a pole position in Kansas.

==== 2025 ====
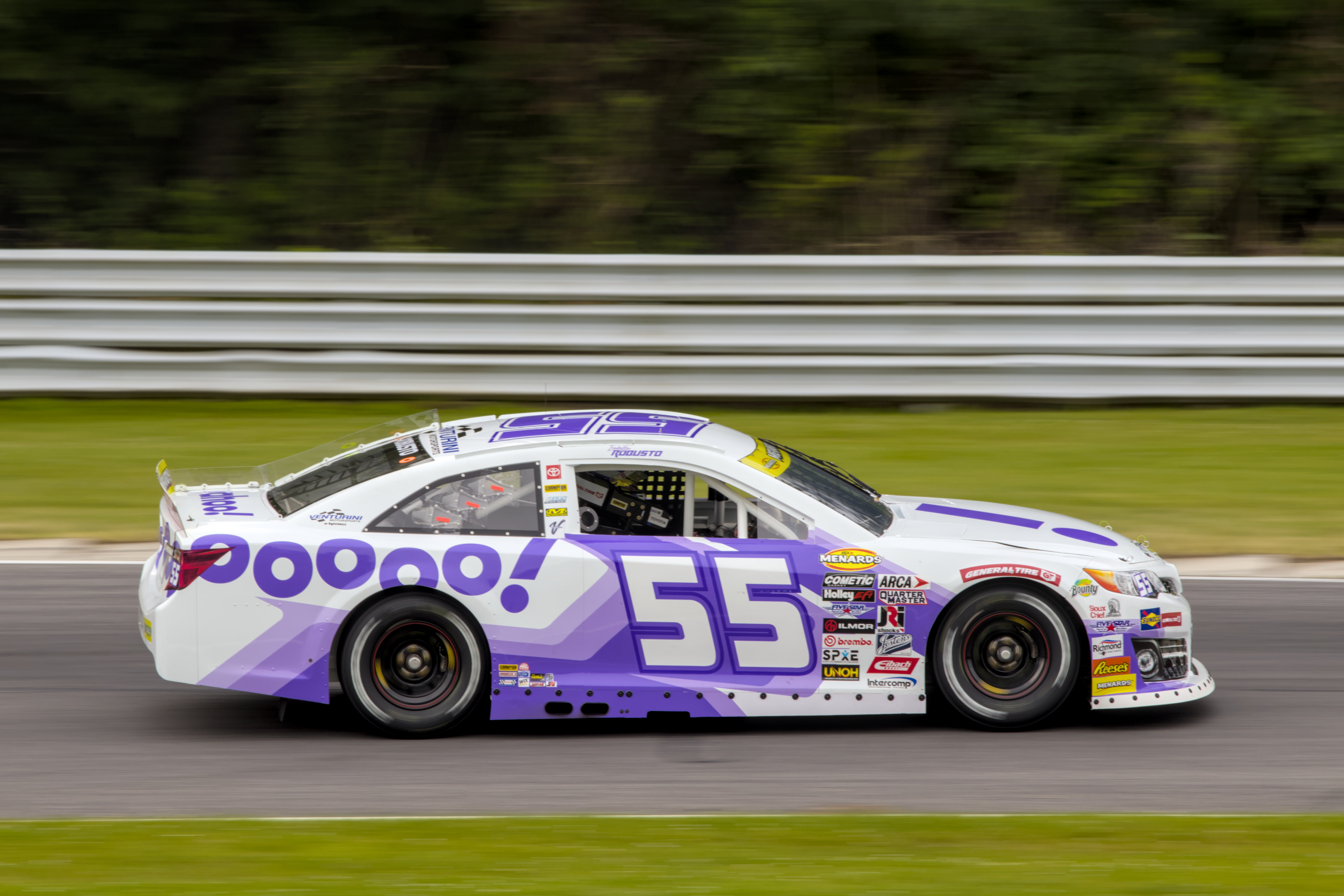
Robusto's No. 55 ARCA car at the Lime Rock Park in 2025

Robusto ran the full 2025 ARCA Menards season with Venturini Motosports in the No. 55 Toyota. At Talledega, she finished third, marking the best finish ever by a female driver at the track. Robusto would have a solid season, earning nine top-fives and fourteen top-tens to finish fourth in the point standings.

=== Other racing ===
==== Sports car racing ====
In 2023, Robusto competed in Pirelli GT4 America and TGR GR Cup North America series competition picking up two top-fives, three top-tens, and one podium in four starts with the GT4's all coming for TGR-Smooge Racing.

== Personal life ==
Robusto is from Fort Mill, South Carolina. She graduated from Fort Mill High School in August 2022, a year ahead of when she was originally scheduled to. She also has a twin brother, Will Robusto, who races in Pirelli GT4 America competition. Robusto has used the number 55 since the beginning of her racing career as a tribute to Will, who races the number 22. She explains that the numbers look the same when flipped upside down, symbolizing their own unique connection and the similarity between them, while still being different individuals.

Robusto is very active in the fitness community and is a part of the Virginia's Blue Ridge–TWENTY24 cycling team. She played kicker on Fort Mill High School's football team.

== Motorsports career results ==
=== Career summary ===
| Season | Series | Team | Races | Wins | Top 5 | Top 10 | Points | Position |
|---|---|---|---|---|---|---|---|---|
| 2022 | CARS Late Model Stock Car Tour | Lee Faulk Racing | 4 | 0 | 0 | 0 | 72 | 26th |
| 2023 | CARS Late Model Stock Car Tour | Lee Faulk Racing | 3 | 0 | 0 | 0 | 16 | 65th |
| 2023 | CARS Pro Late Model Tour | N/A | 1 | 0 | 0 | 1 | 43 | 35th |
| 2023 | GT4 America Series - Am | TGR Smooge Racing | 4 | 0 | 0 | 0 | 28 | 15th |
| 2023 | Toyota GR Cup North America | TGR Smooge Racing | ? | ? | ? | ? | 0 | 28th |
| 2024 | ARCA Menards Series | Venturini Motorsports | 4 | 0 | 2 | 3 | 137 | 35th |
| 2024 | ARCA Menards Series East | Venturini Motorsports | 1 | 0 | 1 | 1 | 43 | 37th |
| 2024 | ARCA Menards Series West | Venturini Motorsports | 6 | 0 | 2 | 4 | 213 | 15th |
| 2024 | CARS Late Model Stock Car Tour | Lee Pulliam Performance | 11 | 0 | 0 | 3 | 185 | 19th |
| 2025 | ARCA Menards Series | Venturini Motorsports | 20 | 0 | 9 | 14 | 846 | 4th |
| 2025 | ARCA Menards Series East | Venturini Motorsports | 4 | 0 | 3 | 3 | 188 | 11th |
| 2025 | ARCA Menards Series West | Venturini Motorsports | 1 | 0 | 0 | 0 | 46 | 40th |
| 2025 | ARCA Menards Series West | RAFA Racing Team | 1 | 0 | 0 | 0 | 46 | 40th |
| 2026 | ARCA Menards Series | Nitro Motorsports | 20 | 0 | 3 | 10 | 814 | **3rd** |
| 2026 | ARCA Menards Series East | Nitro Motorsports | 4 | 0 | 1 | 1 | 109 | 18th |
| 2026 | ARCA Menards Series West | Nitro Motorsports | 1 | 0 | 0 | 0 | 23 | 77th |
| 2026 | ARCA Menards Series West | RAFA Racing Team | 0 | 0 | 0 | 0 | 23 | 77th |

^{†} As Robusto was a guest driver, he was ineligible for championship points.

=== ARCA Menards Series ===
(key) (Bold – Pole position awarded by qualifying time. Italics – Pole position earned by points standings or practice time. * – Most laps led. ** – All laps led.)

ARCA Menards Series results
| Year | Team | No. | Make | 1 | 2 | 3 | 4 | 5 | 6 | 7 | 8 | 9 | 10 | 11 | 12 | 13 | 14 | 15 | 16 | 17 | 18 | 19 | 20 | AMSC | Pts | Ref |
|---|---|---|---|---|---|---|---|---|---|---|---|---|---|---|---|---|---|---|---|---|---|---|---|---|---|---|
| 2024 | Venturini Motorsports | 55 | Toyota | DAY | PHO; 6 | TAL | DOV | KAN | CLT | IOW | MOH | BLN | IRP | SLM | ELK; 4 | MCH | | | | | | **KAN**; 28 | TOL | 35th | 137 | |
| 2024 | Venturini Motorsports | 20 | Toyota | | | | | | | | | | | | | | ISF; 2 | MLW | DSF | GLN | BRI | | | 35th | 137 | |
| 2025 | Venturini Motorsports | 55 | Toyota | DAY; 21 | PHO; 31 | TAL; 3 | KAN; 13 | CLT; 24 | MCH; 9 | BLN; 6 | ELK; 5 | LRP; 10 | DOV; 3 | IRP; 4 | IOW; 4 | GLN; 8 | ISF; 21 | MAD; 4 | DSF; 4 | BRI; 27 | SLM; 5 | KAN; 10 | TOL; 4 | 4th | 846 | |
| 2026 | Nitro Motorsports | 55 | Toyota | DAY; 37 | PHO; 21 | KAN; 22 | TAL; 4 | GLN; 6 | TOL; 6 | MCH; 7 | POC; 13 | BER; 5 | ELK; 6 | CHI; 13 | LRP; 25 | IRP; 30 | IOW; 11 | ISF; 8 | MAD; 7 | DSF; 14 | SLM; 5 | BRI; 20 | KAN; 8 | 3rd | 814 | |

==== ARCA Menards Series East ====
ARCA Menards Series East results
| Year | Team | No. | Make | 1 | 2 | 3 | 4 | 5 | 6 | 7 | 8 | AMSEC | Pts | Ref |
|---|---|---|---|---|---|---|---|---|---|---|---|---|---|---|
| 2024 | Venturini Motorsports | 55 | Toyota | FIF | DOV | NSV; 2 | FRS | IOW | IRP | MLW | BRI | 37th | 43 | |
| 2025 | Venturini Motorsports | 55 | Toyota | FIF | CAR | NSV | FRS | DOV; 3 | IRP; 4 | IOW; 4 | BRI; 27 | 11th | 188 | |
| 2026 | Nitro Motorsports | 55 | Toyota | HCY | CAR | NSV | TOL; 6 | IRP; 30 | FRS | IOW; 11 | BRI; 20 | 18th | 109 | |

==== ARCA Menards Series West ====
ARCA Menards Series West results
| Year | Team | No. | Make | 1 | 2 | 3 | 4 | 5 | 6 | 7 | 8 | 9 | 10 | 11 | 12 | 13 | AMSWC | Pts | Ref |
|---|---|---|---|---|---|---|---|---|---|---|---|---|---|---|---|---|---|---|---|
| 2024 | Venturini Motorsports | 55 | Toyota | PHO; 6 | KER | PIR; 3 | SON; 6 | IRW; 2 | IRW; 17 | SHA | TRI | MAD | AAS | KER; 18 | PHO | | 15th | 213 | |
| 2025 | Venturini Motorsports | 55 | Toyota | KER | PHO; 31 | TUC | CNS | KER | SON | TRI | PIR | AAS | MAD | LVS | | | 40th | 46 | |
| 2025 | RAFA Racing Team | 2 | Toyota | | | | | | | | | | | | PHO; 11 | | 40th | 46 | |
| 2026 | Nitro Motorsports | 55 | Toyota | KER | PHO; 21 | TUC | SHA | CNS | TRI | SON | PIR | AAS | MAD | LVS | | | 77th | 23 | |
| 2026 | RAFA Racing Team | 2 | Toyota | | | | | | | | | | | | PHO; Wth | KER | 77th | 23 | |

=== CARS Late Model Stock Car Tour ===
(key) (Bold – Pole position awarded by qualifying time. Italics – Pole position earned by points standings or practice time. * – Most laps led. ** – All laps led.)

CARS Late Model Stock Car Tour results
| Year | Team | No. | Make | 1 | 2 | 3 | 4 | 5 | 6 | 7 | 8 | 9 | 10 | 11 | 12 | 13 | 14 | 15 | 16 | 17 | CLMSCTC | Pts | Ref |
|---|---|---|---|---|---|---|---|---|---|---|---|---|---|---|---|---|---|---|---|---|---|---|---|
| 2022 | Lee Faulk Racing | 10 | Toyota | CRW | HCY | GRE | AAS | FCS | LGY | DOM | HCY; 13 | ACE | MMS | NWS | | | | | | | 26th | 72 | |
| 2022 | Lee Faulk Racing | 55R | Toyota | | | | | | | | | | | | TCM; 11 | ACE | | | | | 26th | 72 | |
| 2022 | Lee Faulk Racing | 55 | Toyota | | | | | | | | | | | | | | SBO; 19 | CRW; 17 | | | 26th | 72 | |
| 2023 | Lee Faulk Racing | 55 | Toyota | SNM; 30 | FLC; 29 | HCY; 21 | ACE | NWS | LGY | DOM | CRW | HCY | ACE | TCM | WKS | AAS | SBO | TCM | CRW | | 65th | 16 | |
| 2024 | Lee Pulliam Performance | 55 | Toyota | SNM | HCY | AAS; 10 | OCS; 27 | ACE; 8 | TCM; 15 | LGY | DOM; 15 | CRW | HCY; 16 | NWS | ACE; 8 | WCS; 15 | FLC; 29 | SBO; 23 | TCM | NWS; 12 | 19th | 185 | |

=== CARS Pro Late Model Tour ===
(key)

CARS Pro Late Model Tour results
| Year | Team | No. | Make | 1 | 2 | 3 | 4 | 5 | 6 | 7 | 8 | 9 | 10 | 11 | 12 | 13 | CPLMTC | Pts | Ref |
|---|---|---|---|---|---|---|---|---|---|---|---|---|---|---|---|---|---|---|---|
| 2023 | N/A | 28 | Toyota | SNM; 6 | HCY; 19* | ACE | NWS | TCM | DIL | CRW | WKS | HCY | TCM | SBO | TCM | CRW | 35th | 43 | |
