= Alex Clubb =

American racing driver (born 1991)

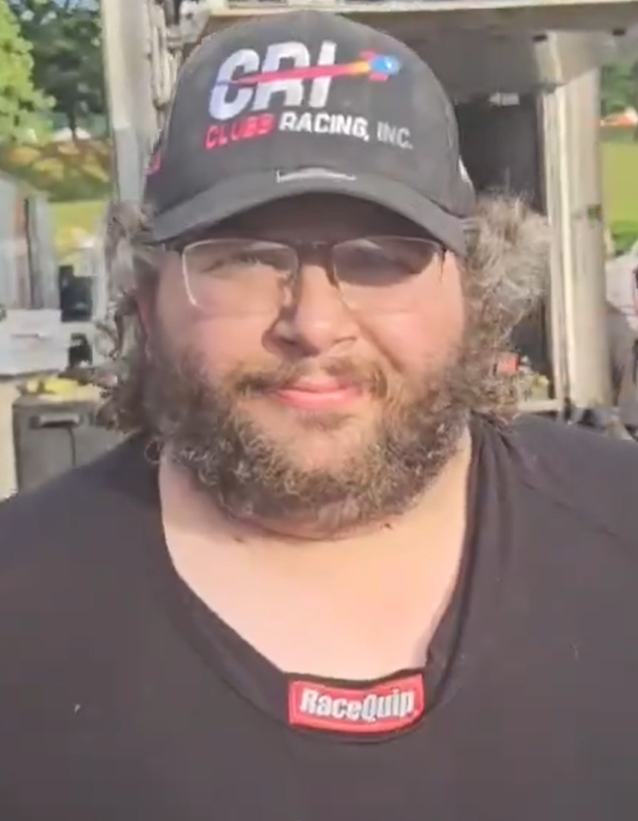
- Clubb at Lime Rock Park in 2026
- Born: October 23, 1991 (age 35); Morris, Illinois, U.S.

ARCA Menards Series career
- 106 races run over 11 years
- ARCA no., team: No. 03 (Clubb Racing Inc.)
- Best finish: 6th (2025)
- First race: 2015 Herr's Chase the Taste 200 (Winchester)
- Last race: 2026 Menards 150 (Kansas)
Wins	Top tens	Poles
0	6	0

ARCA Menards Series East career
- 22 races run over 5 years
- ARCA East no., team: No. 03 (Clubb Racing Inc.)
- Best finish: 11th (2026)
- First race: 2021 Sprecher 150 (Milwaukee)
- Last race: 2026 Bush's Best 200 (Bristol)
Wins	Top tens	Poles
0	0	0

ARCA Menards Series West career
- 5 races run over 5 years
- ARCA West no., team: No. 03 (Clubb Racing Inc.)
- Best finish: 58th (2023)
- First race: 2022 General Tire 150 (Phoenix)
- Last race: 2026 General Tire 150 (Phoenix)
Wins	Top tens	Poles
0	0	0
- Statistics up to date as of September 25, 2026.

Alex J. Clubb (born October 23, 1991) is an American professional stock car racing driver who competes full-time in the ARCA Menards Series, driving the No. 03 Ford for his family-owned team, Clubb Racing Inc.

== Racing career ==
=== ARCA Menards Series ===
Clubb would get his start with Carter 2 Motorsports in 2015, retiring and finishing 26th due to valve issues. He would run two more races that year, finishing a best of seventeenth at the Illinois State Fairgrounds Racetrack.

In 2017, Clubb would make his return, this time driving with his team, Clubb Racing. He would make select starts for the next three seasons, finishing a best of twelfth at Toledo.

In 2019, Clubb would make a one-off start with Wayne Peterson Racing, finishing last due to brake problems.

In 2020, Clubb would sign with Fast Track Racing after missing most of the season due to the birth of his newly born son. He would retire, finishing last due to vibrations.

In 2021, Clubb would form a new team with fellow driver Tim Richmond, combining their assets to form Richmond Clubb Motorsports. Clubb would race seven races of the year, with Richmond running nine. He would manage to achieve his first top-ten at the 2021 Dutch Boy 150 and would get another at the next race. The season would see him with his best season yet, finishing 21st in the standings. After Richmond got injured at the 2021 Henry Ford Health System 200, Clubb was expecting to replace him, but he was replaced by Zachary Tinkle instead. The two split ways afterward.

In 2022, Clubb would announce that he would go back to running his team, hoping to run full-time. He would run fourteen races during the season, finishing thirteenth in the point standings. The following 2023 season saw Clubb compete in fourteen races again but would improve his point standings finish to eleventh.

In 2024, Clubb finally ran full-time for his team. His eighth place finish at Daytona would be his only top-ten finish of the season, but he would finish the season ninth in the points standings.

Clubb ran full-time again in 2025 for his team. He slightly improved from last season, earning two top-tens and finishing a career best sixth in the point standings.

== Personal life ==
Clubb is currently married, and has one son, born in 2020.

Clubb is the owner of a lawn care company in his hometown, called A. Clubb Lawn Care, and works as a bouncer on weekends he isn't racing. Clubb is also a member of the Morris City Council, and is a Republican.

== Motorsports career results ==
=== Stock car career summary ===
Season	Series	Team	Races	Wins	Top 5	Top 10	Points	Position
2015	ARCA Racing Series	Carter 2 Motorsports	3	0	0	0	270	84th
2017	ARCA Racing Series	Clubb Racing	1	0	0	0	140	100th
2018	ARCA Menards Series	Clubb Racing	3	0	0	0	430	47th
2019	ARCA Menards Series	Clubb Racing	2	0	0	0	455	37th
2019	ARCA Menards Series	Wayne Peterson Racing	1	0	0	0	455	37th
2020	ARCA Menards Series	Fast Track Racing	1	0	0	0	26	80th
2021	ARCA Menards Series East	Richmond Clubb Motorsports	1	0	0	0	27	49th
2021	ARCA Menards Series	Richmond Clubb Motorsports	7	0	0	2	220	21st
2022	ARCA Menards Series West	Clubb Racing Inc.	1	0	0	0	23	62nd
2022	ARCA Menards Series East	Clubb Racing Inc.	3	0	0	0	109	19th
2022	ARCA Menards Series	Clubb Racing Inc.	14	0	0	0	393	13th
2023	ARCA Menards Series West	Clubb Racing Inc.	1	0	0	0	26	58th
2023	ARCA Menards Series East	Clubb Racing Inc.	3	0	0	0	74	24th
2023	ARCA Menards Series	Clubb Racing Inc.	14	0	0	1	413	11th
2024	ARCA Menards Series West	Clubb Racing Inc.	1	0	0	0	14	75th
2024	ARCA Menards Series East	Clubb Racing Inc.	5	0	0	0	179	16th
2024	ARCA Menards Series	Clubb Racing Inc.	20	0	0	1	702	9th
2025	ARCA Menards Series West	Clubb Racing Inc.	1	0	0	0	16	79th
2025	ARCA Menards Series East	Clubb Racing Inc.	4	0	0	0	145	16th
2025	ARCA Menards Series	Clubb Racing Inc.	20	0	0	2	743	6th
2026	ARCA Menards Series West	Clubb Racing Inc.	1	0	0	0	22	78th
2026	ARCA Menards Series East	Clubb Racing Inc.	6	0	0	0	202	11th
2026	ARCA Menards Series	Clubb Racing Inc.	20	0	0	0	686	7th

=== ARCA Menards Series ===
(key) (Bold – Pole position awarded by qualifying time. Italics – Pole position earned by points standings or practice time. * – Most laps led.)

ARCA Menards Series results
Year	Team	No.	Make	1	2	3	4	5	6	7	8	9	10	11	12	13	14	15	16	17	18	19	20	AMSC	Pts	Ref
2015	Carter 2 Motorsports	40	Dodge	DAY	MOB	NSH	SLM	TAL	TOL	NJM	POC	MCH	CHI	WIN; 26	IOW	IRP	POC	BLN						84th	270	
2015	Carter 2 Motorsports	97	Dodge																ISF; 17	DSF; 26	SLM	KEN	KAN	84th	270	
2017	Clubb Racing	97	Ford	DAY	NSH	SLM	TAL	TOL	ELK	POC	MCH	MAD	IOW	IRP	POC	WIN	ISF; 18	ROA	DSF	SLM	CHI	KEN	KAN	100th	140	
2018	Clubb Racing	03	Ford	DAY	NSH	SLM	TAL	TOL	CLT	POC	MCH	MAD	GTW	CHI	IOW	ELK	POC	ISF; 15	BLN	DSF; 16	SLM; 21	IRP	KAN	47th	430	
2019	Clubb Racing	03	Ford	DAY	FIF	SLM; 15	TAL	NSH	TOL; 12	CLT	POC	MCH	MAD	GTW	CHI									37th	455	
2019	Wayne Peterson Racing	0	Dodge													ELK; 20	IOW	POC	ISF	DSF	SLM	IRP	KAN	37th	455	
2020	Fast Track Racing	01	Ford	DAY	PHO	TAL	POC	IRP	KEN	IOW	KAN	TOL	TOL	MCH	DAY	GTW	L44	TOL	BRI	WIN	MEM	ISF; Wth	KAN; 18	80th	26	
2021	Richmond Clubb Motorsports	27	Ford	DAY	PHO	TAL	KAN; 10	TOL; 8	CLT	MOH	POC	ELK; 12	BLN; 11	IOW	WIN; 15	GLN	MCH	ISF; 15						21st	220	
2021	Richmond Clubb Motorsports	27	Toyota																MLW; 17	DSF	BRI	SLM	KAN	21st	220	
2022	Clubb Racing Inc.	03	Ford	DAY	PHO; 21	TAL	KAN; 17	CLT	IOW; 16	BLN	ELK; 15	MOH	POC; 28	IRP; 23	MCH; 17	GLN	ISF; 11	MLW; 28	DSF; 21	KAN; 18	BRI; 29	SLM; 12	TOL; 17	13th	393	
2023	Clubb Racing Inc.	03	Ford	DAY	PHO; 18	TAL; 33	KAN; 19	CLT; 21	BLN	ELK	MOH	IOW; 13	POC; 19	MCH; 22	IRP	GLN	ISF; 15	MLW; 23	DSF; 9	KAN; 13	BRI; 22	SLM; 15	TOL; 11	11th	413	
2024	Clubb Racing Inc.	03	Ford	DAY; 8	PHO; 30	TAL; 25	DOV; 18	KAN; 24	CLT; 25	IOW; 14	MOH; 19	BLN; 12	IRP; 21	SLM; 12	ELK; 16	MCH; 18	ISF; 16	MLW; 19	DSF; 15	GLN; 21	BRI; 19	KAN; 27	TOL; 19	9th	702	
2025	Clubb Racing Inc.	03	Ford	DAY; 16	PHO; 28	TAL; 20	KAN; 18	CLT; 19	MCH; 20	BLN; 12	ELK; 10	LRP; 12	DOV; 18	IRP; 22	IOW; 20	GLN; 16	ISF; 8	MAD; 13	DSF; 11					6th	743	
2025	Clubb Racing Inc.	86	Ford																	BRI; 21	SLM; 19	KAN; 19	TOL; 15	6th	743	
2026	Clubb Racing Inc.	03	Ford	DAY; 36	PHO; 22	KAN; 15	TAL; 34	GLN; 21	TOL; 14	MCH; 21	POC; 15	BER; 13	ELK; 13	CHI; 22	LRP; 22	IRP; 20	IOW; 22	ISF; 19	MAD; 15	DSF; 12	SLM; 20	BRI; 21	KAN; 17	7th	686	

==== ARCA Menards Series East ====
ARCA Menards Series East results
Year	Team	No.	Make	1	2	3	4	5	6	7	8	AMSEC	Pts	Ref
2021	Richmond Clubb Motorsports	27	Toyota	NSM	FIF	NSV	DOV	SNM	IOW	MLW; 17	BRI	49th	27	
2022	Clubb Racing Inc.	03	Ford	NSM	FIF	DOV	NSV	IOW; 16	MLW; 28	BRI; 29		19th	109	
2023	Clubb Racing Inc.	03	Ford	FIF	DOV	NSV	FRS	IOW; 13	IRP	MLW; 23	BRI; 22	24th	74	
2024	Clubb Racing Inc.	03	Ford	FIF	DOV; 18	NSV	FRS	IOW; 14	IRP; 21	MLW; 19	BRI; 19	16th	179	
2025	Clubb Racing Inc.	03	Ford	FIF	CAR	NSV	FRS	DOV; 18	IRP; 22	IOW; 20		16th	145	
2025	Clubb Racing Inc.	86	Ford								BRI; 21	16th	145	
2026	Clubb Racing Inc.	03	Ford	HCY	CAR	NSV; Wth	TOL; 14	IRP; 20	FRS; 13	IOW; 22	BRI; 21	11th	202	
2026	Clubb Racing Inc.	86	Ford			NSV; 22						11th	202	

==== ARCA Menards Series West ====
(key) (Bold – Pole position awarded by qualifying time. Italics – Pole position earned by points standings or practice time. * – Most laps led.)

ARCA Menards Series West results
Year	Team	No.	Make	1	2	3	4	5	6	7	8	9	10	11	12	13	AMSWC	Pts	Ref
2022	Clubb Racing Inc.	03	Ford	PHO; 21	IRW	KCR	PIR	SON	IRW	EVG	PIR	AAS	LVS	PHO			62nd	23	
2023	Clubb Racing Inc.	03	Ford	PHO; 18	IRW	KCR	PIR	SON	IRW	SHA	EVG	AAS	LVS	MAD	PHO		58th	26	
2024	Clubb Racing Inc.	03	Ford	PHO; 30	KER	PIR	SON	IRW	IRW	SHA	TRI	MAD	AAS	KER	PHO		75th	14	
2025	Clubb Racing Inc.	03	Ford	KER	PHO; 28	TUC	CNS	KER	SON	TRI	PIR	AAS	MAD	LVS	PHO		79th	16	
2026	Clubb Racing Inc.	03	Ford	KER	PHO; 22	TUC	SHA	CNS	TRI	SON	PIR	AAS	MAD	LVS	PHO	KER	78th	22	
