= Ben Peterson (racing driver) =

American racing driver (born 1997)

- Born: June 26, 1997 (age 29); Birmingham, Alabama, U.S.

ARCA Menards Series career
- 6 races run over 4 years
- Best finish: 59th (2019)
- First race: 2019 Kentuckiana Ford Dealers Fall Classic 200 (Salem)
- Last race: 2026 Spruce 212 (Salem)
Wins	Top tens	Poles
0	0	0

ARCA Menards Series East career
- 1 race run over 1 year
- Best finish: 64th (2026)
- First race: 2026 JR & CO. 150 (Iowa)
Wins	Top tens	Poles
0	0	0
- Statistics up to date as of September 12, 2026.

Benjamin Peterson (born June 26, 1997) is an American professional stock car racing driver. He last competed part-time in the ARCA Menards Series, driving the No. 06 Toyota for Wayne Peterson Racing. He is the grandson of longtime ARCA driver and team owner Wayne Peterson.

== Racing career ==
In 2019, Peterson made his debut in the ARCA Menards Series at Salem Speedway, driving the No. 0 Ford for Wayne Peterson Racing. He went on to finish 21st after running only three laps due to brake issues. He then entered in the next event at Lucas Oil Raceway, where he did not set a time in qualifying and did not start the race; he would officially be classified in 22nd position.

In 2024, Peterson participated in the pre-season test for the ARCA Menards Series at Daytona International Speedway, driving the No. 06 Toyota for Wayne Peterson Racing, and was the fastest of seven drivers who piloted the same 06 Toyota placing 70th in the overall results between the two testing days. In April of that year, it was revealed that Peterson would drive the No. 0 Toyota at Talladega Superspeedway. Driving a short track car at the superspeedway, he started 34th and drove up to 30th but would finish in 34th after mechanical issues plagued his run after seven laps. Peterson would return at Talladega in 2025, driving the No. 0 Ford with sponsorship from Auburn Athletics, and would finish 36th after running only ten laps due to overheating issues.

== Motorsports career results ==
=== ARCA Menards Series ===
(key) (Bold – Pole position awarded by qualifying time. Italics – Pole position earned by points standings or practice time. * – Most laps led.)

ARCA Menards Series results
Year	Team	No.	Make	1	2	3	4	5	6	7	8	9	10	11	12	13	14	15	16	17	18	19	20	AMSC	Pts	Ref
2019	Wayne Peterson Racing	0	Ford	DAY	FIF	SLM	TAL	NSH	TOL	CLT	POC	MCH	MAD	GTW	CHI	ELK	IOW	POC	ISF	DSF	SLM; 21	IRP; 22	KAN	59th	245	
2024	Wayne Peterson Racing	0	Toyota	DAY	PHO	TAL; 34	DOV	KAN	CLT	IOW	MOH	BLN	IRP	SLM	ELK	MCH	ISF	MLW	DSF	GLN	BRI	KAN	TOL	117th	10	
2025	Wayne Peterson Racing	0	Ford	DAY	PHO	TAL; 36	KAN	CLT	MCH	BLN	ELK	LRP	DOV	IRP	IOW	GLN	ISF	MAD	DSF	BRI	SLM	KAN	TOL	141st	8	
2026	Wayne Peterson Racing	06	Toyota	DAY	PHO	KAN	TAL	GLN	TOL	MCH	POC	BER	ELK	CHI	LRP	IRP	IOW; 26	ISF	MAD	DSF				79th	43	
2026	Wayne Peterson Racing	06	Ford																		SLM; 19	BRI	KAN	79th	43	

==== ARCA Menards Series East ====
ARCA Menards Series East results
Year	Team	No.	Make	1	2	3	4	5	6	7	8	AMSEC	Pts	Ref
2026	Wayne Peterson Racing	06	Toyota	HCY	CAR	NSV	TOL	IRP	FRS	IOW; 26	BRI	64th	18	

^{*} Season still in progress
^{1} Ineligible for series points
