= 2018 in motorsport =

The following is an overview of the events of 2018 in motorsport, including the major racing events, motorsport venues that were opened and closed during a year, championships and non-championship events that were established and disestablished in a year, and births and deaths of racing drivers and other motorsport people.

== Annual events ==
The calendar includes only annual major non-championship events or annual events that had significance separate from the championship. For the dates of the championship events see related season articles.

Date	Event	Ref
6–20 January	40th Dakar Rally	
27–28 January	56th 24 Hours of Daytona	
5–6 February	29th Race of Champions	
18 February	60th Daytona 500	
17 March	66th 12 Hours of Sebring	
12–13 May	46th 24 Hours of Nürburgring	
27 May	76th Monaco Grand Prix	
27 May	102nd Indianapolis 500	
26 May–8 June	100th Isle of Man TT	
16–17 June	86th 24 Hours of Le Mans	
28–29 July	70th 24 Hours of Spa	
7 October	61st Bathurst 1000	
9–10 November	17th IFMAR 1:8 IC Off-Road World Championship	
18 November	65th Macau Grand Prix	

== Established championships/events ==
First race	Championship	Ref
1 April	TCR UK Touring Car Championship	
7 April	GT4 Belgium	
8 April	World Touring Car Cup	
22 April	IFMAR 1:10 Electric Drifting World Cup	
3 June	GT4 Nordic European Cup	
14 July	F3 Asian Championship	
4 August	F3 Americas Championship	
25 August	TCR Korea Touring Car Championship	

== Opened motorsport venues ==
Date	Venue	First event	Ref
3 February	Santiago Street Circuit	Santiago ePrix	
14 April	Circuto Cittadino dell'EUR	Rome ePrix	

== Deaths ==
Date	Month	Name	Age	Nationality	Occupation	Note	Ref
13	January	Erhard "Dallas" Mathiesen	69	Swedish	Sport administrator	3rd president of IFMAR	
14	January	Dan Gurney	86	American	Racing driver	Winner of the 24 Hours of Le Mans (1967)	
27	January	Jerry Sneva	68	American	Racing driver	1977 Indianapolis 500 Rookie of the Year	
10	March	Ralf Waldmann	51	German	Motorcycle rider	Winner of the 20 Grand Prix motorcycle racing events (125cc and 250cc).	
8	April	John Miles	74	British	Racing driver		
28	April	James Hylton	83	American	Racing driver		
10	June	Tom "Mongo$e" McEwen	81	American	drag racer		
25	July	Sergio Marchionne	66	Italian-Canadian	Businessman	The chief executive officer (CEO) of Fiat Chrysler Automobiles, the chairman and CEO of FCA US LLC, the chairman and CEO of Ferrari, and the chairman of Maserati	
8	September	Barrie "Whizzo" Williams	79	British	Racing driver		
11	September	Don Panoz	83	American	Entrepreneur	Panoz LLC, Élan Motorsport Technologies and American Le Mans Series founder	
23	September	Juan Marcos Angelini	31	Argentine	Racing driver	Turismo Carretera driver	
3	November	Mari Hulman George	83	American	Businesswoman	Chairperson of the Indianapolis Motor Speedway	
12	November	David Pearson	83	American	Racing driver	Three-time NASCAR Grand National Series champion	

== See also ==
- List of 2018 motorsport champions
