= Nick White (racing driver) =

American racing driver (born 2006)

- Born: July 25, 2006 (age 20); Inglis, Florida, U.S.

ARCA Menards Series career
- 3 races run over 2 years
- Best finish: 75th (2026)
- First race: 2025 General Tire 200 (Talladega)
- Last race: 2026 Sunset Hill Shooting Range 150 (Pocono)
Wins	Top tens	Poles
0	0	0
- Statistics up to date as of September 26, 2026.

Nick White (born July 25, 2006) is an American professional stock car racing driver. He last competed part-time in the ARCA Menards Series, driving the No. 22 Chevrolet for Drew White Motorsports. He is the son of former racing driver Drew White, who formerly competed in ARCA, as well as the NASCAR Busch Series.

== Racing career ==
White has previously competed in the Southern Pro Am Truck Series, the Florida Pro Truck Challenge Series, and the World Series of Asphalt Stock Car Racing.

In 2025, it was revealed that White would participate in the pre-season test for the ARCA Menards Series at Daytona International Speedway, driving the No. 00 Toyota for Kennedy Aiken Racing. A month later, it was revealed that White would attempt to make his debut in the season opening race at Daytona, this time driving the No. 22 Chevrolet for Drew White Motorsports, although he would withdraw for the event before practice. He would enter in the race at Talladega Superspeedway, where he would fail to start the race after suffering an engine failure in practice. He was officially credited with a 38th place finish.

In 2026, it was revealed that White would once again participate in the pre-season test for the ARCA Menards Series at Daytona International Speedway, this time driving the No. 22 for Drew White Motorsports, where he set the 65th quickest time between the two sessions held.

== Motorsports results ==
=== ARCA Menards Series ===
(key) (Bold – Pole position awarded by qualifying time. Italics – Pole position earned by points standings or practice time. * – Most laps led. ** – All laps led.)

ARCA Menards Series results
Year	Team	No.	Make	1	2	3	4	5	6	7	8	9	10	11	12	13	14	15	16	17	18	19	20	AMSC	Pts	Ref
2025	Drew White Motorsports	22	Chevy	DAY; Wth	PHO	TAL; 38	KAN	CLT	MCH	BLN	ELK	LRP	DOV	IRP	IOW	GLN	ISF	MAD	DSF	BRI	SLM	KAN	TOL	142nd	6	
2026	Drew White Motorsports	22	Chevy	DAY; DNQ	PHO	KAN	TAL; DNQ	GLN	TOL	MCH; 28	POC; 21	BER	ELK	CHI	LRP	IRP	IOW	ISF	MAD	DSF	SLM	BRI	KAN	75th	45	
