= Drew White (racing driver) =

American racing driver and team owner

- Born: December 4, 1966 (age 59); Inglis, Florida, U.S.

NASCAR O'Reilly Auto Parts Series career
- 7 races run over 3 years
- Best finish: 66th (2001)
- First race: 2001 Nazareth 200 (Nazareth)
- Last race: 2001 Sam's Town 250 (Memphis)
Wins	Top tens	Poles
0	0	0

ARCA Menards Series career
- 35 races run over 12 years
- Best finish: 37th (1999)
- First race: 1991 Slick 50 ARCA 500k (College Station)
- Last race: 2006 Allen Crowe Memorial 100 (Springfield)
Wins	Top tens	Poles
0	0	0
- Statistics up to date as of February 12, 2025.

Drew White (born December 4, 1966) is an American former professional stock car racing driver and team owner who has previously competed in the NASCAR Busch Series and the ARCA Re/Max Series. He is the father of fellow racing driver Nick White, who has also competed in the now ARCA Menards Series.

== Motorsports results ==
=== NASCAR ===
(key) (Bold – Pole position awarded by qualifying time. Italics – Pole position earned by points standings or practice time. * – Most laps led.)

==== Busch Series ====
NASCAR Busch Series results
Year	Team	No.	Make	1	2	3	4	5	6	7	8	9	10	11	12	13	14	15	16	17	18	19	20	21	22	23	24	25	26	27	28	29	30	31	32	33	34	NBSC	Pts	Ref
2001	William Fain	13	Chevy	DAY	CAR	LVS	ATL	DAR	BRI	TEX	NSH	TAL	CAL	RCH	NHA	NZH; 40	CLT	DOV	KEN	MLW																		66th	328	
2001	White Motorsports	22	Chevy																		GLN; 36	CHI	GTY; 38	PPR; 39	IRP; 42	MCH	BRI	DAR; 37	RCH	DOV	KAN	CLT	MEM; 39	PHO	CAR; DNQ	HOM		66th	328	
2002	White Motorsports	22	Chevy	DAY	CAR	LVS	DAR	BRI	TEX	NSH	TAL	CAL	RCH	NHA	NZH	CLT	DOV	NSH	KEN	MLW	DAY	CHI	GTY; DNQ	PPR	IRP	MCH	BRI	DAR	RCH	DOV	KAN	CLT	MEM	ATL	CAR	PHO	HOM	N/A	0	
2003	White Motorsports	28	Chevy	DAY	CAR	LVS	DAR	BRI	TEX	TAL	NSH	CAL	RCH	GTY	NZH	CLT	DOV	NSH	KEN	MLW	DAY	CHI	NHA	PPR; DNQ	IRP	MCH	BRI	DAR	RCH	DOV	KAN	CLT	MEM	ATL	PHO	CAR	HOM	N/A	0	

=== ARCA Re/Max Series ===
(key) (Bold – Pole position awarded by qualifying time. Italics – Pole position earned by points standings or practice time. * – Most laps led.)

ARCA Re/Max Series results
Year	Team	No.	Make	1	2	3	4	5	6	7	8	9	10	11	12	13	14	15	16	17	18	19	20	21	22	23	24	25	ARSC	Pts	Ref
1991	Drew White Motorsports	97	Pontiac	DAY	ATL	KIL	TAL	TOL	FRS	POC	MCH	KIL	FRS	DEL	POC	TAL; DNQ	HPT	MCH	ISF	TOL	DSF	TWS; 39	ATL						N/A	0	
1992	Drew White Motorsports	97	Pontiac	DAY	FIF	TWS; 36	TAL	TOL	KIL	POC	MCH; 42	FRS	KIL	NSH	DEL	POC	HPT	FRS	ISF	TOL	DSF	TWS	SLM	ATL					N/A	0	
1994	Drew White Motorsports	97	Pontiac	DAY; DNQ	TAL	FIF	LVL	KIL	TOL	FRS	MCH	DMS	POC	POC	KIL	FRS	INF	I70	ISF	DSF	TOL	SLM	WIN	ATL					N/A	0	
1996	Drew White Motorsports	98	Pontiac	DAY; DNQ																									N/A	0	
1996	Drew White Motorsports	99	Pontiac		ATL; 32	SLM	TAL; 39	FIF	LVL	CLT	CLT; DNQ	KIL	FRS	POC	MCH; 21	FRS	TOL	POC; 24	MCH; 31	INF	SBS	ISF	DSF	KIL	SLM	WIN	CLT	ATL	N/A	0	
1997	Drew White Motorsports	98	Pontiac	DAY; 32	ATL; 35	SLM	CLT	CLT	POC; 15	MCH; 24	SBS	TOL	KIL	FRS	MIN	POC; 34	MCH; 25	DSF	GTW	SLM	WIN	CLT	TAL; 25	ISF	ATL				N/A	0	
1998	Drew White Motorsports	98	Chevy	DAY; DNQ	ATL			MEM; 35	MCH; 34	POC; 35	SBS	TOL	PPR; 33	POC	KIL; DNQ	FRS	ISF	ATL; 34	DSF	SLM	TEX; DNQ	WIN	CLT; DNQ	TAL; DNQ	ATL; 36				N/A	0	
1998	Drew White Motorsports	12	Pontiac			SLM; 31																							N/A	0	
1998	Drew White Motorsports	76	Chevy				CLT; 39																						N/A	0	
1999	Drew White Motorsports	98	Chevy	DAY; DNQ	ATL; 38												FLM; DNQ	ISF	WIN	DSF	SLM	CLT; DNQ	TAL; DNQ	ATL; DNQ					37th	880	
1999	Drew White Motorsports	12	Chevy			SLM; DNQ																							37th	880	
1999	Drew White Motorsports	98	Pontiac				AND; DNQ	CLT; 19	MCH; 34	POC; 34	TOL	SBS	BLN; 29	POC; 38	KIL	FRS													37th	880	
1999	Drew White Motorsports	06	Pontiac				AND; 24																						37th	880	
2000	Drew White Motorsports	98	Chevy	DAY; DNQ	SLM	AND	CLT; DNQ	KIL	FRS	MCH; DNQ	POC	TOL	KEN; 35	BLN	POC; DNQ	WIN	ISF	KEN	DSF	SLM	CLT	TAL; DNQ	ATL						92nd	205	
2001	Drew White Motorsports	98	Chevy	DAY; DNQ	NSH	WIN	SLM	GTY	KEN	CLT	KAN	MCH	POC	MEM	GLN	KEN	MCH	POC	NSH	ISF	CHI	DSF	SLM	TOL	BLN	CLT			N/A	0	
2001	N/A	13	Chevy																								TAL; DNQ	ATL	N/A	0	
2004	James Hylton Motorsports	48	Chevy	DAY	NSH; 39	SLM	KEN	TOL	CLT	KAN																			137th	140	
2004	Drew White Motorsports	24	Chevy								POC; 35	MCH	SBO	BLN	KEN	GTW													137th	140	
2004	Drew White Motorsports	9	Chevy														POC; 36	LER	NSH	ISF	TOL	DSF	CHI	SLM	TAL				137th	140	
2005	Drew White Motorsports	93	Chevy	DAY	NSH; Wth	SLM	KEN	TOL	LAN																				155th	90	
2005	Wayne Peterson Racing	6	Chevy							MIL; 39	POC; 38	MCH	KAN	KEN	BLN	POC	GTW	LER	NSH	MCH	ISF	TOL	DSF	CHI	SLM	TAL			155th	90	
2006	Hixson Motorsports	2	Chevy	DAY	NSH	SLM	WIN	KEN	TOL	POC	MCH	KAN	KEN	BLN	POC	GTW	NSH	MCH	ISF; 30										143rd	105	
2006	Norm Benning Racing	8	Chevy																	MIL; DNQ	TOL	DSF	CHI	SLM	TAL	IOW			143rd	105	
