= Wayne Peterson (racing driver) =

American racing driver and team owner

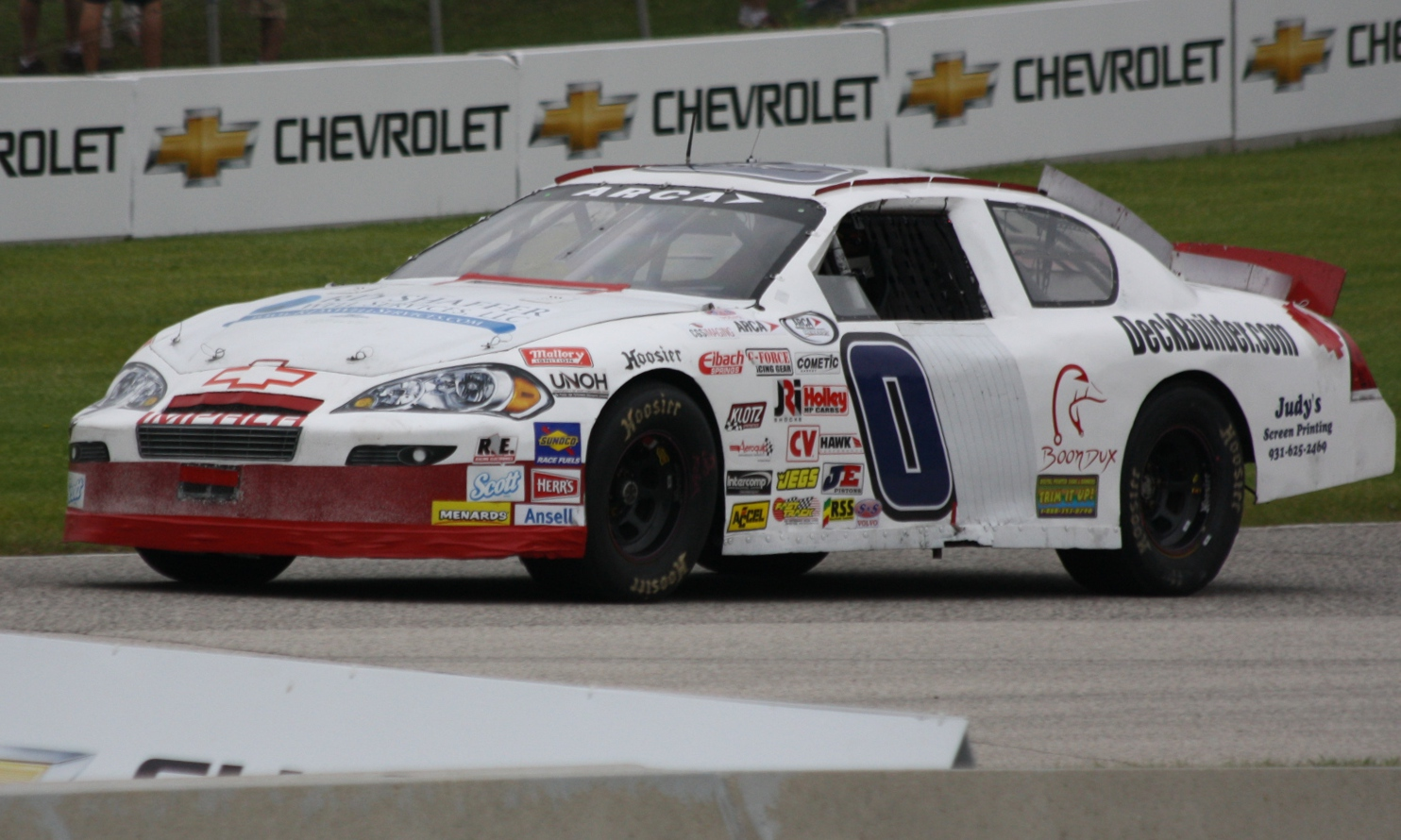
- Peterson competing in the 2013 ARCA race at Road America
- Born: Wayne Peterson; May 24, 1938 (age 88) Boaz, Alabama, U.S.

ARCA Menards Series career
- Debut season: 1983
- Current team: Wayne Peterson Racing
- Car number: 06
- Engine: Chevrolet
- Starts: 118
- Wins: 0
- Poles: 0
- Best finish: 18th in 2016
- Finished last season: 62nd (2021)
- Military career
- Allegiance: United States of America
- Branch: United States Army
- Service years: 1954–1981
- Units: XVIII Airborne Corps; Third United States Army; Army Special Forces (77th, 10th, 1st, 5th, 7th Special Forces Groups)
- Conflicts: Vietnam War; Bay of Pigs Invasion; Operation Eagle Claw

Wayne Peterson (born May 24, 1938) is an American professional stock car racing owner/driver and former paratrooper and United States Army Special Forces member. He currently operates Wayne Peterson Racing, a team in the ARCA Menards Series.

== Military career ==
Peterson grew up in a poor family in Boaz, Alabama, and when he was fifteen years old, his high school was visited by Army National Guard recruiters. Attracted by the benefits of food and clothing, he enlisted and entered active duty at the age of sixteen, but was sent back to school upon the discovering of his age. After graduating, he returned to the military and was stationed at Fort Bragg as a paratrooper in the XVIII Airborne Corps. Peterson was a member of the United States Army Parachute Team (Golden Knights), and worked with NASA on performing High Altitude Low Opening (HALO) landings.

Peterson was later assigned to the Third United States Army for thirty days, during which he was placed in the 77th and attended Ranger School in Fort Benning, followed by survival training in Antarctica and language studies in California, the latter in which he learned French and Vietnamese. Peterson served in Germany and Okinawa with the 10th and 1st Special Forces Groups respectively before being deployed to Vietnam in 1963 as an advisor and eventually a combat role. He served multiple tours during the Vietnam War until 1972.

In 1961, Peterson trained Cuban refugees and participated in the failed Bay of Pigs Invasion. Two years later, he guarded President John F. Kennedy's body in the United States Capitol rotunda after his assassination. He also served as Richard Nixon and South Vietnamese President Nguyễn Văn Thiệu's English/Vietnamese translator.

Peterson was scheduled to complete his service in 1980 when the government extended it by thirteen months. He was ordered to Diego Garcia, where plans were made for Operation Eagle Claw, an effort to free United States embassy members in the Iran hostage crisis. However, the mission failed after two aircraft were destroyed during refueling. Peterson compared the debacle and resulting public backlash to that received by American troops withdrawing from Vietnam: "We had to abort, put our tail between our legs, same way we came out of Nam. We just didn't finish the job. [...] We had way too much TV coverage in Nam. The public don't need to know our missions; it messed with intelligence. Nam was a hard time, soldiers condemned for pulling the trigger. Of course, if you waited one second and thought about it, you were dead. We fought for the country, and our own survival. It wasn't pretty. You were there to save your people."

== Racing career ==
At the age of fourteen, Peterson swept floors for a dirt track racing owner who would let him test his car. While he was stationed at Fort Bragg, he purchased a 1948 Hudson and converted it into a dirt track car. Peterson later joined NASCAR driver Lee Petty's crew as a gasman, followed by a tenure with Junior Johnson on the DiGard Motorsports team. As compensation, Johnson gave him a car, which he fielded for Lennie Pond at Talladega Superspeedway. He also competed in modified stock cars in the 1970s.

During the 1980s, Peterson began competing in the Automobile Racing Club of America. In 1983, he entered the NASCAR Winston Cup Series' Atlanta Journal 500, but spun out during qualifying due to tire issues. The following year, he tried to qualify for the Daytona 500, but did not make the race after suffering an engine failure in his Twin 125 qualifier and finishing tenth in the consolation race.

Wayne Peterson Racing fields various cars in the ARCA Menards Series. His drivers have included Tim Mitchell, a colorectal cancer survivor who raced for the team in the 2000s; Zachary Gibson, son of ARCA Midget Series racer Larry Gibson and grandson of Indianapolis 500 driver Todd Gibson, in 2009; and NASCAR Craftsman Truck Series driver Clay Greenfield in 2004. Greenfield, described by The Leaf-Chronicle as a "talented kid with no name", finished 12th in his series debut at Salem Speedway, marking the team's strongest finish since 1998. As of 2020, Tim Richmond, Steve Cronenwett and Jim Walker share the team's best race finish of ninth at Toledo Speedway and Talladega in 2004 as well as Toledo in 2020, respectively. The team has continued to field cars for drivers such as Brayton Laster, A. J. Moyer, Nate Moeller, and Cody Dennison.

== Personal life ==
Peterson was married to Sarah Peterson and has three sons, Michael, Brian, and Kevin, and five grandchildren, one of which is Ben Peterson, who competed in ARCA for WPR in 2019, 2024, and 2025. Sarah died in February 2008. Peterson currently resides in Pulaski, Tennessee.

== Motorsports career results ==
=== NASCAR ===
(key) (Bold – Pole position awarded by qualifying time. Italics – Pole position earned by points standings or practice time. * – Most laps led.)

==== Winston Cup Series ====
NASCAR Winston Cup Series results
Year	Team	No.	Make	1	2	3	4	5	6	7	8	9	10	11	12	13	14	15	16	17	18	19	20	21	22	23	24	25	26	27	28	29	30	NWCC	Pts	Ref
1983	Peterson Motorsports	83	Buick	DAY	RCH	CAR	ATL	DAR	NWS	MAR	TAL	NSV	DOV	BRI	CLT	RSD	POC	MCH	DAY	NSV	POC	TAL	MCH	BRI	DAR	RCH	DOV	MAR	NWS	CLT	CAR; DNQ	ATL; DNQ	RSD	NA	-	
1984	Peterson Motorsports	06	Buick	DAY; DNQ	RCH	CAR	ATL	BRI	NWS	DAR	MAR	TAL	NSV	DOV	CLT	RSD	POC	MCH	DAY	NSV	POC	TAL	MCH	BRI	DAR	RCH	DOV	MAR	CLT	NWS	CAR	ATL	RSD	NA	-	

===== Daytona 500 =====
Year	Team	Manufacturer	Start	Finish
1984	Peterson Motorsports	Buick	DNQ	

=== ARCA Menards Series ===
(key) (Bold – Pole position awarded by qualifying time. Italics – Pole position earned by points standings or practice time. * – Most laps led.)

ARCA Menards Series results
Year	Team	No.	Make	1	2	3	4	5	6	7	8	9	10	11	12	13	14	15	16	17	18	19	20	21	22	23	24	25	AMSC	Pts	Ref
1983		8	Buick	DAY	NSV	TAL	LPR	LPR	ISF	IRP	SSP	FRS	BFS	WIN	LPR	POC	TAL; 26	MCS	FRS	MIL	DSF	ZAN	SND						NA	-	
1984	Peterson Motorsports	06	Buick	DAY	ATL	TAL; 22	CSP	SMS	FRS	MCS	LCS	IRP	TAL	FRS	ISF	DSF	TOL	MGR											NA	-	
1994	Wayne Peterson Racing	06	Pontiac	DAY; 32	TAL	FIF	LVL	KIL	TOL	FRS	MCH	DMS	POC	POC	KIL	FRS	IND	I70	ISF	DSF	TOL	SLM	WIN	ATL					133rd	-	
2001	Wayne Peterson Racing	6	Chevy	DAY	NSH	WIN	SLM	GTY	KEN	CLT	KAN	MCH	POC	MEM	GLN; 28	KEN	MCH	POC	NSH	ISF									133rd	165	
2001	Wayne Peterson Racing	7	Chevy																		CHI; 36	DSF	SLM	TOL	BLN	CLT	TAL	ATL	133rd	165	
2002	Wayne Peterson Racing	06	Chevy	DAY; DNQ	ATL	NSH	SLM	KEN	CLT	KAN	POC	MCH	TOL	SBO	KEN	BLN	POC	NSH	ISF	WIN	DSF	CHI	SLM	TAL	CLT				NA	-	
2003	Wayne Peterson Racing	27	Chevy	DAY	ATL	NSH	SLM	TOL	KEN	CLT	BLN	KAN; 36	MCH	LER															131st	165	
2003	Wayne Peterson Racing	06	Chevy												POC; 37	POC	NSH	ISF	WIN										131st	165	
2003	Wayne Peterson Racing	0	Chevy																	DSF; 37			TAL; DNQ	CLT	SBO				131st	165	
2003	Wayne Peterson Racing	6	Chevy																		CHI; QL^{†}	SLM							131st	165	
2004	Wayne Peterson Racing	06	Chevy	DAY	NSH	SLM	KEN; 36	TOL	CLT	KAN; 21			SBO; 24	BLN	KEN							DSF; 23	CHI	SLM	TAL				52nd	580	
2004	Wayne Peterson Racing	16	Chevy								POC; 38	MCH; DNQ					POC; DNQ	LER	NSH	ISF	TOL								52nd	580	
2004	Jan Gibson Racing	56	Chevy													GTW; 33													52nd	580	
2005	Wayne Peterson Racing	06	Chevy	DAY	NSH	SLM	KEN	TOL; DNQ	LAN	MIL	POC; 40																		78th	385	
2005	Wayne Peterson Racing	09	Chevy									MCH; DNQ											DSF; DNQ	CHI	SLM; DNQ	TAL			78th	385	
2005	Day Enterprises	90	Ford										KAN; 37	KEN	BLN														78th	385	
2005	Wayne Peterson Racing	0	Chevy													POC; 40													78th	385	
2005	Norm Benning Racing	8	Chevy														GTW; 40	LER	NSH	MCH									78th	385	
2005	Wayne Peterson Racing	16	Chevy																		ISF; 35	TOL							78th	385	
2006	Wayne Peterson Racing	0	Ford	DAY	NSH; DNQ	SLM; DNQ	WIN; DNQ	KEN	TOL	POC	MCH			BLN; DNQ	POC	GTW	NSH				TOL; DNQ	DSF; 35	CHI; DNQ	SLM	TAL	IOW			107th	205	
2006	Wayne Peterson Racing	0	Chevy									KAN; DNQ	KEN					MCH; DNQ	ISF	MIL									107th	205	
2007	Wayne Peterson Racing	0	Chevy	DAY	USA	NSH; DNQ	SLM; DNQ	KAN	WIN	KEN; DNQ	TOL	IOW; 35	POC; DNQ	MCH; DNQ	BLN	KEN; DNQ	POC; DNQ	NSH	ISF; 37	MIL; 39	GTW	DSF; DNQ	CHI	SLM	TAL	TOL			68th	385	
2008	Wayne Peterson Racing	0	Chevy	DAY	SLM; DNQ	IOW; DNQ	KAN; DNQ	CAR; 50	KEN; 40		POC; 38	MCH; DNQ	CAY; 33		BLN; 30	POC; DNQ	NSH; 41	ISF; DNQ	DSF; 36	CHI; DNQ	SLM; DNQ	NJE	TAL	TOL					33rd	1050	
2008	Wayne Peterson Racing	0	Ford							TOL; DNQ				KEN; DNQ															33rd	1050	
2009	Wayne Peterson Racing	10	Chevy	DAY	SLM	CAR	TAL; 41	KEN	TOL	POC																			40th	725	
2009	Wayne Peterson Racing	0	Chevy								MCH; DNQ		IOW; 37	KEN; 37	BLN; 34					DSF; 36	NJE	SLM	KAN; 40						40th	725	
2009	Wayne Peterson Racing	0	Ford									MFD; 32							TOL; 31										40th	725	
2009	Wayne Peterson Racing	08	Ford													POC; DNQ	ISF	CHI											40th	725	
2009	Wayne Peterson Racing	06	Ford																					CAR; DNQ					40th	725	
2010	Wayne Peterson Racing	06	Ford	DAY	PBE; 28			TAL; 41									ISF; 35		DSF; 34	TOL									31st	900	
2010	Wayne Peterson Racing	06	Chevy			SLM; 27	TEX																						31st	900	
2010	Wayne Peterson Racing	0	Chevy						TOL; 32	POC; DNQ	MCH; DNQ	IOW; 39		POC; DNQ	BLN; 33	NJE; 35		CHI; 39				KAN; DNQ	CAR						31st	900	
2010	Brad Smith Motorsports	2	Ford										MFD; 31								SLM; 32								31st	900	
2011	Wayne Peterson Racing	06	Chevy	DAY	TAL; 29			NJE; 32	CHI	POC																			41st	585	
2011	Wayne Peterson Racing	06	Ford			SLM; 21	TOL							IOW; 36	IRP														41st	585	
2011	Wayne Peterson Racing	0	Chevy								MCH; 39	WIN; 29	BLN; 32								KAN; 38	TOL							41st	585	
2011	Wayne Peterson Racing	0	Ford													POC; DNQ	ISF	MAD	DSF	SLM									41st	585	
2012	Wayne Peterson Racing	06	Ford	DAY	MOB; DNQ	SLM; 26	TAL	TOL	ELK	POC	MCH								ISF; 29	MAD	SLM	DSF; C							70th	305	
2012	Wayne Peterson Racing	0	Ford									WIN; 26	NJE	IOW	CHI	IRP	POC	BLN					KAN; 39						70th	305	
2013	Wayne Peterson Racing	0	Chevy	DAY	MOB	SLM	TAL	TOL	ELK; 22	POC	MCH; 27	ROA; 25	WIN; 22	CHI; 26	NJE	POC; 31	BLN; 24	ISF; 32					KEN; 31	KAN; 31					21st	1320	
2013	Wayne Peterson Racing	06	Ford																MAD; 26	DSF	IOW								21st	1320	
2013	Wayne Peterson Racing	06	Chevy																			SLM; 26							21st	1320	
2014	Wayne Peterson Racing	0	Ford	DAY	MOB	SLM; 28	TAL	TOL																					26th	1080	
2014	Carter 2 Motorsports	97	Dodge						NJE; 26	POC																			26th	1080	
2014	Wayne Peterson Racing	06	Chevy								MCH; 26	ELK; 23	WIN; 19	CHI															26th	1080	
2014	Wayne Peterson Racing	06	Ford												IRP; 28														26th	1080	
2014	Hylton Motorsports	49	Ford													POC; 31													26th	1080	
2014	Wayne Peterson Racing	00	Chevy														BLN; 24	ISF; 30	MAD; 28	DSF; 30	SLM	KEN; 33	KAN						26th	1080	
2015	Kimmel Racing	80	Ford	DAY	MOB; 25																								21st	1505	
2015	Wayne Peterson Racing	00	Ford			NSH; 29	SLM; 26	TAL	TOL	NJE	POC												KAN; 27						21st	1505	
2015	Wayne Peterson Racing	00	Chevy									MCH; 27								DSF; 29									21st	1505	
2015	Wayne Peterson Racing	0	Ford										CHI; 27	WIN; 21				BLN; 24	ISF; 29		SLM; 28								21st	1505	
2015	Wayne Peterson Racing	0	Chevy												IOW; 29	IRP	POC					KEN; 26							21st	1505	
2016	Wayne Peterson Racing	0	Ford	DAY	NSH	SLM; 25	TAL																						18th	1430	
2016	Wayne Peterson Racing	00	Chevy					TOL; 27	NJE; 27	POC	MCH; 32	MAD; 23	WIN; 22	IOW; 28	IRP; 31	POC	BLN; 25	ISF					KAN; 34						18th	1430	
2016	Wayne Peterson Racing	0	Chevy																DSF; 21	SLM	CHI	KEN; 31							18th	1430	
2017	Wayne Peterson Racing	88	Chevy	DAY	NSH	SLM	TAL	TOL	ELK	POC	MCH; 29	MAD	IOW	IRP	POC	WIN	ISF	ROA	DSF	SLM	CHI	KEN	KAN						117th	85	
2018	Wayne Peterson Racing	1	Ford	DAY	NSH	SLM	TAL	TOL	CLT	POC	MCH; 26	MAD																	43rd	465	
2018	Wayne Peterson Racing	1	Chevy										GTW; 25																43rd	465	
2018	Wayne Peterson Racing	23	Chevy											CHI; 27	IOW; 23	ELK	POC	ISF											43rd	465	
2018	Wayne Peterson Racing	0	Dodge																BLN; 19	DSF									43rd	465	
2018	Wayne Peterson Racing	0	Chevy																		SLM; 24	IRP	KAN						43rd	465	
2019	Wayne Peterson Racing	0	Toyota	DAY	FIF	SLM	TAL	NSH	TOL	CLT	POC	MCH	MAD	GTW; 22	CHI	ELK	IOW	POC											34th	495	
2019	Wayne Peterson Racing	0	Ford																ISF; 21	DSF; 20	SLM	IRP							34th	495	
2019	Wayne Peterson Racing	0	Chevy																				KAN; 22						34th	495	
2020	Wayne Peterson Racing	0	Chevy	DAY	PHO	TAL	POC	IRP	KEN	IOW	KAN	TOL	TOL	MCH	DAY	GTW	L44	TOL	BRI; 26	WIN; 14	MEM; 17	ISF; 17	KAN; 17						32nd	102	
2021	Wayne Peterson Racing	06	Ford	DAY	PHO	TAL	KAN	TOL	CLT	MOH	POC	ELK; 17	BLN	IOW	WIN	GLN	MCH	ISF	MLW										62nd	59	
2021	Wayne Peterson Racing	06	Chevy																	DSF; 15	BRI	SLM							62nd	59	
2021	Brad Smith Motorsports	48	Chevy																				KAN; 24						62nd	59	
^{†} – Qualified for Brian Conz

==== ARCA Menards Series East ====
ARCA Menards Series East results
Year	Team	No.	Make	1	2	3	4	5	6	7	8	AMSEC	Pts	Ref
2020	Wayne Peterson Racing	0	Chevy	NSM	TOL	DOV	TOL	BRI; 26	FIF			52nd	18	
2021	Wayne Peterson Racing	06	Chevy	NSM	FIF; 13	NSV; 13	DOV					22nd	90	
2021	Wayne Peterson Racing	06	Ford					SNM; 16	IOW	MLW	BRI	22nd	90	
