= Kelly Kovski =

American racing driver (born 1981)

- Born: June 16, 1981 (age 45); Springfield, Illinois, U.S.

ARCA Menards Series career
- 41 races run over 22 years
- Best finish: 37th (2013)
- First race: 2004 Southern Illinois 100 (DuQuoin)
- Last race: 2026 Audubon Park 100 (DuQuoin)
Wins	Top tens	Poles
0	28	0
- Statistics up to date as of September 6, 2026.

Kelly Kovski (born June 16, 1981) is an American retired professional racing driver and crew chief. He competed in the ARCA Menards Series for twenty years, primarily racing at the Illinois State Fairgrounds and the DuQuoin State Fairgrounds.

Outside of his ARCA starts, Kovski has also competed in and won at various dirt track events.

== Racing career ==
Kovski would make his ARCA Re/Max Series debut in 2004, driving for Fast Track Racing at the DuQuoin State Fairgrounds Racetrack in the No. 10 Chevrolet, where he would finish fifteenth, a lap down behind race winner Frank Kimmel.

From 2005 to 2011, Kovski would primarily run the dirt races with his own team in collaboration with Roulo Brothers Racing in the No. 39 Chevrolet. In 2005, he would finish in the top-fifteen in both dirt events, and in 2006, he would finish eleventh at the Illinois State Fairgrounds Racetrack. In the following year, he would earn his first top-ten at Springfield, finishing in sixth place, and in the following year, he would finish in the top-ten in both events, finishing in ninth and seventh at Springfield and DuQuoin respectively. In 2009, would get a best finish of twelfth at Springfield, before he would finish in the top-ten in both events again in the following year, running in the No. 17 that year. He would finish sixth at Springfield in 2011, and would go on to earn his first top-five in ARCA competition, finishing fourth at DuQuoin.

In 2012, Kovski switched to Allgaier Motorsports, a team that had won the series championship with Justin Allgaier in 2008. He would start off his tenure with the team by finishing fourth at Springfield in their first race together in the No. 99 Chevrolet. For 2013, he would make his first asphalt race at Toledo Speedway, where he would start 26th, and finish ninth. He would also finish tenth at Berlin Raceway before returning to the dirt events, where he would finish thirteenth at Springfield and eighth at DuQuoin. In 2014, he would delve into a career as a crew chief, working with Team BCR and No. 90 Ford for Grant Enfinger. He would also make starts at the dirt tracks, finishing sixth at Springfield, and finishing 26th due to an engine issue at DuQuoin. He would move with Enfinger to GMS Racing midway through 2014, and would move to the No. 23 Chevrolet in 2015, a year Enfinger would win the championship. Kovski would finish third at Springfield. In 2016, he would earn his best finish of second place behind Tom Hessert III at DuQuoin.

In 2017, Kovski would suffer an accident at a sprint car race at Volusia County Speedway, where he would be struck in the pits by a flipping sprint car. His injuries were significant enough that he would skip both the ARCA dirt races as a driver. He would serve as the crew chief for Enfinger in the No. 16 Chevrolet at Springfield, a race where Enfinger would win.

Kovski would return to driving duties the following year in 2018 for Allgaier, and would finish eighth and seventh at Springfield and DuQuoin respectively. In 2019, he would get his first top-five since 2016, finishing fifth at DuQuoin, and in his only race of 2020, he would finish fifth at Springfield. In the following year at DuQuoin, Kovski would not start the race and would be classified in sixteenth position. In 2022, he would finish fifteenth at Springfield due to an engine failure, and tenth at DuQuoin due to suspension issues.

In 2023, Kovski's results improved, finishing fourth at Springfield and sixth at DuQuoin. In 2024, he finished fourth at Springfield and fifth at DuQuoin. In 2025, he finished third in both dirt events. In 2026, he drove for Allgaier Motorsports in the dirt events. It was announced that following the DuQuoin race, it would be his final race competing in ARCA.

== Motorsports career results ==
=== ARCA Menards Series ===
(key) (Bold – Pole position awarded by qualifying time. Italics – Pole position earned by points standings or practice time. * – Most laps led.)

ARCA Menards Series results
Year	Team	No.	Make	1	2	3	4	5	6	7	8	9	10	11	12	13	14	15	16	17	18	19	20	21	22	23	AMSC	Pts	Ref
2004	Fast Track Racing	10	Chevy	DAY	NSH	SLM	KEN	TOL	CLT	KAN	POC	MCH	SBO	BLN	KEN	GTW	POC	LER	NSH	ISF	TOL	DSF; 15	CHI	SLM	TAL		131st	155	
2005	Kelly Kovski Motorsports	39	Chevy	DAY	NSH	SLM	KEN	TOL	LAN	MIL	POC	MCH	KAN	KEN	BLN	POC	GTW	LER	NSH	MCH	ISF; 14	TOL	DSF; 12	CHI	SLM	TAL	87th	350	
2006	Kelly Kovski Motorsports	39	Chevy	DAY	NSH	SLM	WIN	KEN	TOL	POC	MCH	KAN	KEN	BLN	POC	GTW	NSH	MCH	ISF; 11	MIL	TOL	DSF; 19	CHI	SLM	TAL	IOW	87th	310	
2007	Kelly Kovski Motorsports	39	Chevy	DAY	USA	NSH	SLM	KAN	WIN	KEN	TOL	IOW	POC	MCH	BLN	KEN	POC	NSH	ISF; 6	MIL	GTW	DSF; 16	CHI	SLM	TAL	TOL	75th	350	
2008	Kelly Kovski Motorsports	39	Chevy	DAY	SLM	IOW	KAN	CAR	KEN	TOL	POC	MCH	CAY	KEN	BLN	POC	NSH	ISF; 9	DSF; 7	CHI	SLM	NJE	TAL	TOL			67th	380	
2009	Kelly Kovski Motorsports	39	Chevy	DAY	SLM	CAR	TAL	KEN	TOL	POC	MCH	MFD	IOW	KEN	BLN	POC	ISF; 12	CHI	TOL	DSF; 29	NJE	SLM	KAN	CAR			89th	255	
2010	Kelly Kovski Motorsports	17	Chevy	DAY	PBE	SLM	TEX	TAL	TOL	POC	MCH	IOW	MFD	POC	BLN	NJE	ISF; 6	CHI	DSF; 9	TOL	SLM	KAN	CAR				59th	390	
2011	Kelly Kovski Motorsports	39	Chevy	DAY	TAL	SLM	TOL	NJE	CHI	POC	MCH	WIN	BLN	IOW	IRP	POC	ISF; 6	MAD	DSF; 4	SLM	KAN	TOL					58th	425	
2012	Allgaier Motorsports	99	Chevy	DAY	MOB	SLM	TAL	TOL	ELK	POC	MCH	WIN	NJE	IOW	CHI	IRP	POC	BLN	ISF; 4	MAD	SLM	DSF	KAN				87th	220	
2013	Allgaier Motorsports	16	Dodge	DAY	MOB	SLM	TAL	TOL; 9	ELK	POC	MCH	ROA	WIN	CHI	NJE	POC	BLN; 10										37th	740	
2013	Allgaier Motorsports	16	Chevy															ISF; 13	MAD	DSF; 7	IOW	SLM	KEN	KAN			37th	740	
2014	Allgaier Motorsports	16	Chevy	DAY	MOB	SLM	TAL	TOL	NJE	POC	MCH	ELK	WIN	CHI	IRP	POC	BLN	ISF; 6	MAD	DSF; 26	SLM	KEN	KAN				58th	300	
2015	Allgaier Motorsports	16	Chevy	DAY	MOB	NSH	SLM	TAL	TOL	NJE	POC	MCH	CHI	WIN	IOW	IRP	POC	BLN	ISF; 3	DSF; 10	SLM	KEN	KAN				60th	395	
2016	Allgaier Motorsports	16	Chevy	DAY	NSH	SLM	TAL	TOL	NJE	POC	MCH	MAD	WIN	IOW	IRP	POC	BLN	ISF; 17	DSF; 2	SLM	CHI	KEN	KAN				65th	375	
2018	Allgaier Motorsports	16	Chevy	DAY	NSH	SLM	TAL	TOL	CLT	POC	MCH	MAD	GTW	CHI	IOW	ELK	POC	ISF; 8	BLN	DSF; 7	SLM	IRP	KAN				54th	385	
2019	Allgaier Motorsports	16	Chevy	DAY	FIF	SLM	TAL	NSH	TOL	CLT	POC	MCH	MAD	GTW	CHI	ELK	IOW	POC	ISF; 6	DSF; 5	SLM	IRP	KAN				42nd	410	
2020	Allgaier Motorsports	16	Chevy	DAY	PHO	TAL	POC	IRP	KEN	IOW	KAN	TOL	TOL	MCH	DAY	GTW	I44	TOL	BRI	WIN	MEM	ISF; 5	KAN				54th	39	
2021	Roy Kovski Racing	16	Chevy	DAY	PHO	TAL	KAN	TOL	CLT	MOH	POC	ELK	BLN	IOW	WIN	GLN	MCH	ISF	MLW	DSF; 16	BRI	SLM	KAN				119th	3	
2022	Kelly Kovski Racing	16	Chevy	DAY	PHO	TAL	KAN	CLT	IOW	BLN	ELK	MOH	POC	IRP	MCH	GLN	ISF; 15	MLW	DSF; 10	KAN	BRI	SLM	TOL				54th	63	
2023	Kelly Kovski Racing	16	Chevy	DAY	PHO	TAL	KAN	CLT	BLN	ELK	MOH	IOW	POC	MCH	IRP	GLN	ISF; 4	MLW	DSF; 6	KAN	BRI	SLM	TOL				47th	78	
2024	Kelly Kovski Racing	16	Chevy	DAY	PHO	TAL	DOV	KAN	CLT	IOW	MOH	BLN	IRP	SLM	ELK	MCH	ISF; 4	MLW	DSF; 5	GLN	BRI	KAN	TOL				49th	79	
2025	Kelly Kovski Racing	16	Chevy	DAY	PHO	TAL	KAN	CLT	MCH	BLN	ELK	LRP	DOV	IRP	IOW	GLN	ISF; 3	MAD	DSF; 3	BRI	SLM	KAN	TOL				55th	82	
2026	Allgaier Motorsports	16	Chevy	DAY	PHO	KAN	TAL	GLN	TOL	MCH	POC	BER	ELK	CHI	LRP	IRP	IOW	ISF; 7	MAD	DSF; 3	SLM	BRI	KAN				56th	78	
