= Clifty =

Clifty may refer to:

- Clifty, Arkansas
- Clifty, Kentucky
- Clifty, West Virginia

== See also ==
- Big Clifty, Kentucky
