= Chris Bailey Jr. =

American professional stock car driver

- Born: August 10, 1989 (age 37) South Park, Pennsylvania, U.S.
- Debut season: 2011
- Starts: 39
- Championships: 0
- Wins: 0
- Podiums: 0
- Poles: 0
- Best finish: 19th in 2013
- Statistics up to date as of October 28, 2022.

Chris Bailey Jr. (born August 10, 1989) is an American professional stock car racing driver. He has competed in the ARCA Menards Series from 2011 to 2016. Before this, he won the ARCA Truck Series championship in 2010.

== Racing career ==
Bailey's first foray into major stock car competition came in 2007 in the NASCAR Whelen All-American Series driving in the Pennsylvania State Championship at Lake Erie Speedway. He also ran two races in the Mid-Atlantic Asphalt Racing Alliance. He would run one year in the All American Series before moving to the ARCA Truck Series for one race in 2009 at Lake Erie, finishing fifth. He would return to the series in 2010, winning the series championship in his first year of full-time competition with two wins at Lorain County Speedway and Skyline Speedway. He would run the full schedule for the next two years, finishing runner-up in points in 2011, and fourth in 2012.

Bailey would make his ARCA Racing Series debut in the No. 15 Chevrolet for Venturini Motorsports at Winchester Speedway in 2011, finishing 31st and last after completing only one lap due to handling issues.

After not running in the series the following year, Bailey would return in 2013, running in eleven races that year, with his first start coming with Wayne Peterson Racing and the rest coming with various Kimmel Racing entries. He would earn a career best finish of 14th at Kentucky Speedway, and would finish 19th in the overall standings. For 2014, he would return with the Kimmel outfit, first running in the season opening race at Daytona International Speedway, finishing 16th, although he would spend the rest of the year in a start and park role in his 12 starts that year (including a start for Carter 2 Motorsports at the third race at Salem Speedway).

Bailey would run only five races for Kimmel Racing in 2015, with the best finish of 19th at Talladega Superspeedway. He would move over to Max Force Racing for 10 of the 20 races for 2016, coming with a season best result at the season finale at Kansas Speedway, where he would finish 16th. For 2017, Jent Motorsports announced that they would partner with Bailey for the full season, although they would not run a race that season. He has not competed in the series since.

== Motorsports results ==
=== ARCA Racing Series ===
(key) (Bold – Pole position awarded by qualifying time. Italics – Pole position earned by points standings or practice time. * – Most laps led.)

ARCA Racing Series results
Year	Team	No.	Make	1	2	3	4	5	6	7	8	9	10	11	12	13	14	15	16	17	18	19	20	21	ARSC	Pts	Ref
2011	Venturini Motorsports	15	Chevy	DAY	TAL	SLM	TOL	NJE	CHI	POC	MCH	WIN; 31	BLN	IOW	IRP	POC	ISF	MAD	DSF	SLM	KAN	TOL			153rd	75	
2013	Wayne Peterson Racing	06	Ford	DAY	MOB	SLM	TAL	TOL; 24	ELK																19th	1365	
2013	Kimmel Racing	69	Ford							POC; 23	MCH	ROA											KEN; 14		19th	1365	
2013	Kimmel Racing	67	Ford										WIN; 21	CHI; 24	NJM; 28							SLM; 28			19th	1365	
2013	Kimmel Racing	68	Ford													POC; 32	BLN	ISF; 30	MAD	DSF; 31	IOW			KAN; 28	19th	1365	
2014	Kimmel Racing	68	Ford	DAY; 16	MOB					POC; 29	MCH; 24	ELK; 20	WIN	CHI; 24	IRP; 30	POC	BLN; 22	ISF; 26	MAD	DSF; 31					25th	1250	
2014	Carter 2 Motorsports	40	Dodge			SLM; 29	TAL																		25th	1250	
2014	Kimmel Racing	69	Ford					TOL; 26	NJE												SLM; 29	KEN	KAN; 32		25th	1250	
2015	Kimmel Racing	80	Ford	DAY	MOB	NSH; 27	SLM																		46th	490	
2015	Kimmel Racing	68	Ford					TAL; 19				MCH; 26	CHI	WIN	IOW	IRP	POC; 30	BLN	ISF	DSF	SLM	KEN	KAN		46th	490	
2015	Kimmel Racing	67	Ford						TOL; 30	NJE	POC														46th	490	
2016	Max Force Racing	11	Ford	DAY	NSH	SLM	TAL	TOL	NJE	POC; 34					IRP; 30		BLN; 23	ISF	DSF						28th	965	
2016	Max Force Racing	23	Ford								MCH; 30	MAD	WIN	IOW; 27		POC; 17					CHI; 32				28th	965	
2016	Max Force Racing	30	Ford																	SLM; 26					28th	965	
2016	Max Force Racing	5	Ford																			KEN; 32	KAN; 16		28th	965	
