= 2016 ARCA Racing Series =

64th season of the ARCA Racing Series

Seasons
- ← 2015 2017 →

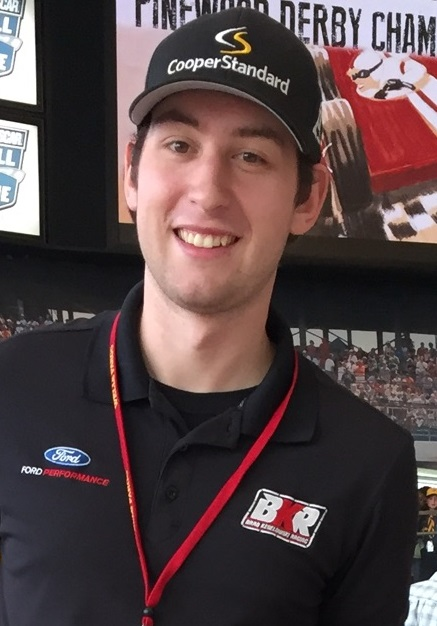
Chase Briscoe, the 2016 ARCA champion.

The 2016 ARCA Racing Series presented by Menards was the 64th season of the ARCA Racing Series. The season began on February 13 with the Lucas Oil 200 driven by General Tire and ended on October 14 with the Kansas 150. Rookie Chase Briscoe, driving the No. 77 for Cunningham Motorsports, won the drivers' championship.

Tom Hessert III finished second in the championship standings, 535 points behind Briscoe. Matt Kurzejewski finished third in the standings.

== Teams and drivers ==
=== Complete schedule ===
Manufacturer	Team	No.	Driver
Chevrolet	Bret Holmes Racing	23	Bret Holmes 7
Chevrolet	Bret Holmes Racing	23	Grant Enfinger 1
Ford	Max Force Racing	23	Brad Smith 1
Ford	Max Force Racing	23	Chase Storch 5
Ford	Max Force Racing	23	Chris Bailey Jr. 4
Ford	Max Force Racing	23	Dick Doheny 1
Ford	Max Force Racing	9	Thomas Praytor
Ford	Empire Racing 6 James Hylton Motorsports 14	48	Sean Corr 3
Ford	Empire Racing 6 James Hylton Motorsports 14	48	Dylan Martin 3
Ford	Empire Racing 6 James Hylton Motorsports 14	48	Brad Smith 14
Toyota	Venturini Motorsports	25	Tom Hessert III
Toyota	Venturini Motorsports	55	William Byron 1
Toyota	Venturini Motorsports	55	Cole Williams 1
Toyota	Venturini Motorsports	55	Dalton Sargeant (R) 15
Toyota	Venturini Motorsports	55	Nicole Behar 1
Toyota	Venturini Motorsports	55	Tanner Thorson 1
Toyota	Venturini Motorsports	55	Ken Schrader 1
Chevrolet 11 Ford 9	Fast Track Racing	10	Ed Pompa 7
Chevrolet 11 Ford 9	Fast Track Racing	10	Rick Clifton 1
Chevrolet 11 Ford 9	Fast Track Racing	10	Dick Doheny 3
Chevrolet 11 Ford 9	Fast Track Racing	10	Austin Nemire 1
Chevrolet 11 Ford 9	Fast Track Racing	10	Rick Clifton 1
Chevrolet 11 Ford 9	Fast Track Racing	10	Tyler Speer 2
Chevrolet 11 Ford 9	Fast Track Racing	10	Kyle Weatherman 5
Chevrolet 2 Ford 18	Fast Track Racing	27	Dick Doheny 3
Chevrolet 2 Ford 18	Fast Track Racing	27	Rick Clifton 1
Chevrolet 2 Ford 18	Fast Track Racing	27	Ed Pompa 1
Chevrolet 2 Ford 18	RFMS Racing	27	A. J. Fike 15
Chevrolet 15 Ford 5	Jent Motorsports	14	Joey Gattina 1
Chevrolet 15 Ford 5	Jent Motorsports	14	Dustin Knowles (R) 14
Chevrolet 15 Ford 5	Jent Motorsports	14	Cory Howard 2
Chevrolet 15 Ford 5	Jent Motorsports	14	Michael Whipple 3
Chevrolet 15 Ford 5	Jent Motorsports	14	Morgen Baird 1
Chevrolet 4 Ford 16	Kimmel Racing 17; Finney Racing Enterprises 3	69	Will Kimmel 11
Chevrolet 4 Ford 16	Kimmel Racing 17; Finney Racing Enterprises 3	69	Brian Finney 3
Chevrolet 4 Ford 16	Kimmel Racing 17; Finney Racing Enterprises 3	69	Barry Layne 1
Chevrolet 4 Ford 16	Kimmel Racing 17; Finney Racing Enterprises 3	69	Nick Higdon 2
Chevrolet 4 Ford 16	Kimmel Racing 17; Finney Racing Enterprises 3	69	Kevin Hinckle 2
Chevrolet 4 Ford 16	Kimmel Racing 17; Finney Racing Enterprises 3	69	Mark Meunier 1
Chevrolet 17 Ford 3	Mason Mitchell Motorsports	98	Gus Dean 5
Chevrolet 17 Ford 3	Mason Mitchell Motorsports	98	Brady Boswell 6
Chevrolet 17 Ford 3	Mason Mitchell Motorsports	98	David Levine 1
Chevrolet 17 Ford 3	Mason Mitchell Motorsports	98	Kyle Weatherman 2
Chevrolet 17 Ford 3	Mason Mitchell Motorsports	98	Quinnton Bear 1
Chevrolet 17 Ford 3	Mason Mitchell Motorsports	98	Justin Haley 1
Chevrolet 17 Ford 3	Mason Mitchell Motorsports	98	Mason Mitchell 2
Chevrolet 17 Ford 3	Mason Mitchell Motorsports	98	Mason Mingus 1
Chevrolet 17 Ford 3	Mason Mitchell Motorsports	98	Brent Sherman 1
Chevrolet 19 Ford 1	RACE 101 8 Hixson Motorsports 12	2	Sarah Cornett-Ching 8
Chevrolet 19 Ford 1	RACE 101 8 Hixson Motorsports 12	2	Brad Smith 2 (Note: Brad Smith's entry at Talladega was fielded in a collaboration with James Hylton Motorsports.)
Chevrolet 19 Ford 1	RACE 101 8 Hixson Motorsports 12	2	Steve Fox 1
Chevrolet 19 Ford 1	RACE 101 8 Hixson Motorsports 12	2	Frank Jiovani 1
Chevrolet 19 Ford 1	RACE 101 8 Hixson Motorsports 12	2	Mike Senica (R) 1
Chevrolet 19 Ford 1	RACE 101 8 Hixson Motorsports 12	2	Ray Ciccarelli 2
Chevrolet 19 Ford 1	RACE 101 8 Hixson Motorsports 12	2	Rick Tackman 1
Chevrolet 19 Ford 1	RACE 101 8 Hixson Motorsports 12	2	Eric Caudell 3
Chevrolet 19 Ford 1	RACE 101 8 Hixson Motorsports 12	2	Joe Cooksey 1
Chevrolet 12 Ford 8 Dodge 3	Wayne Peterson Racing	0	Cory Howard 1
Chevrolet 12 Ford 8 Dodge 3	Wayne Peterson Racing	0	Mike Senica (R) 1
Chevrolet 12 Ford 8 Dodge 3	Wayne Peterson Racing	0	Wayne Peterson 4
Chevrolet 12 Ford 8 Dodge 3	Wayne Peterson Racing	0	Tim Viens 1
Chevrolet 12 Ford 8 Dodge 3	Wayne Peterson Racing	0	Mat Vannier 1
Chevrolet 12 Ford 8 Dodge 3	Wayne Peterson Racing	0	Dale Matchett 1
Chevrolet 12 Ford 8 Dodge 3	Wayne Peterson Racing	0	Con Nicolopoulos 3
Chevrolet 12 Ford 8 Dodge 3	Wayne Peterson Racing	0	Richard Hauck 6
Chevrolet 12 Ford 8 Dodge 3	Wayne Peterson Racing	0	Dale Shearer 1
Chevrolet 12 Ford 8 Dodge 3	Wayne Peterson Racing	0	Brad Smith 1
Chevrolet 3 Dodge 17	Wayne Peterson Racing	06	Tim Viens 1
Chevrolet 3 Dodge 17	Wayne Peterson Racing	06	Alx Danielsson 1
Chevrolet 3 Dodge 17	Wayne Peterson Racing	06	Con Nicolopoulos 14
Chevrolet 3 Dodge 17	Wayne Peterson Racing	06	Joey Gattina 1
Chevrolet 3 Dodge 17	Wayne Peterson Racing	06	Don Thompson 2
Chevrolet 3 Dodge 17	Wayne Peterson Racing	06	Mark Meunier 1
Ford 3 Chevrolet 17	Josh Williams Motorsports 19; Lira Motorsports 1	6	Josh Williams 19
Ford 3 Chevrolet 17	Josh Williams Motorsports 19; Lira Motorsports 1	6	Michael Lira 1 (Note: Entry was fielded in a collaboration with Josh Williams Motorsports.)
Dodge 4 Chevrolet 16	Hamilton-Hughes Racing 4 Hixson Motorsports 16	64	Eric Caudell 2
Dodge 4 Chevrolet 16	Hamilton-Hughes Racing 4 Hixson Motorsports 16	64	Ronnie Osmer 1
Dodge 4 Chevrolet 16	Hamilton-Hughes Racing 4 Hixson Motorsports 16	64	Bobby Hamilton Jr. 1
Dodge 4 Chevrolet 16	Hamilton-Hughes Racing 4 Hixson Motorsports 16	64	Richard Hauck 1
Dodge 4 Chevrolet 16	Hamilton-Hughes Racing 4 Hixson Motorsports 16	64	Steve Fox 3
Dodge 4 Chevrolet 16	Hamilton-Hughes Racing 4 Hixson Motorsports 16	64	Morgen Baird 2
Dodge 4 Chevrolet 16	Hamilton-Hughes Racing 4 Hixson Motorsports 16	64	Mike Senica (R) 10
Dodge 3 Ford 17	Cunningham Motorsports	22	Kevin Thomas Jr. (R) 2
Dodge 3 Ford 17	Cunningham Motorsports	22	Blake Jones 1
Dodge 3 Ford 17	Cunningham Motorsports	22	Brady Boswell 1
Dodge 3 Ford 17	Cunningham Motorsports	22	Myatt Snider 9
Dodge 3 Ford 17	Cunningham Motorsports	22	Parker Kligerman 1
Dodge 3 Ford 17	Cunningham Motorsports	22	Will Kimmel 2
Dodge 3 Ford 17	Cunningham Motorsports	22	Clayton Weatherman 1
Dodge 3 Ford 17	Cunningham Motorsports	22	Ken Schrader 1
Dodge 3 Ford 17	Cunningham Motorsports	22	Frank Kimmel 1
Dodge 3 Ford 17	Cunningham Motorsports	77	Chase Briscoe (R)
Ford 3 Chevrolet 17	Mullins Racing 3 Darrell Basham Racing 17	34	Willie Mullins 3
Ford 3 Chevrolet 17	Mullins Racing 3 Darrell Basham Racing 17	34	Mike Basham 17
Toyota 18 Chevrolet 2	Ken Schrader Racing	52	Matt Kurzejewski

=== Limited schedule ===
Manufacturer	Team	No.	Driver	Rounds
Chevrolet	Alger Motorsports	70	Billy Alger	3
Chevrolet	Allgaier Motorsports	16	Kelly Kovski	2
Chevrolet	Athenian Motorsports	05	John Wes Townley	12
Chevrolet	Athenian Motorsports	05	Cole Custer	1
Chevrolet	Athenian Motorsports	05	Parker Kligerman	1
Chevrolet	Braden Racing	01	Travis Braden	2
Chevrolet	Braun Motorsports	74	Justin Haley	3
Chevrolet	Brother-In-Law Racing	57	Bryan Dauzat	3
Chevrolet	Brother-In-Law Racing	76	Andy Seuss	1
Chevrolet	Carter 2 Motorsports	40	Justin Lloyd	1
Chevrolet	Cushman Racing	13	J. J. Pack	1
Chevrolet	Cushman Racing	13	George Cushman	2
Chevrolet	Danny Glad Racing (Note: Entries were fielded in a collaboration with Crosley Sports Group.)	56	Josh Reeves	1
Chevrolet	Derrick Lancaster Racing	83	Derrick Lancaster	1
Chevrolet	DGM Racing	80	Russ Dugger	1
Chevrolet	Ebert Motorsports	19	David Sear	4
Chevrolet	Finney Racing Enterprises	80	Scott Reeves	3
Chevrolet	Francis Engineering Racing	61	Jake Francis	1
Chevrolet	Grant County Mulch Racing (Note: Entries were fielded in a collaboration with Win-Tron Racing.)	7	Codie Rohrbaugh	2
Chevrolet	Higdon Racing (Note: Entries were fielded in a collaboration with Kimmel Racing.)	08	Nick Higdon	4
Chevrolet	Higdon Racing	08	Will Kimmel	1
Chevrolet	Invicta Motorsports	43	John Ferrier	1
Chevrolet	Ken Schrader Racing	54	Cole Custer	1
Chevrolet	MacZink Racing	65	Jeffery MacZink	2
Chevrolet	Mason Mitchell Motorsports	78	Cole Powell	1
Chevrolet	Mason Mitchell Motorsports	78	Noah Gragson	1
Chevrolet	Mason Mitchell Motorsports	78	Mason Mitchell	1
Chevrolet	Mason Mitchell Motorsports	78	Gus Dean	1
Chevrolet	Our Motorsports	02	Andy Seuss	1
Chevrolet	Ranier Racing with MDM	8	Brandon Jones	5
Chevrolet	Ranier Racing with MDM	8	Harrison Burton	1
Chevrolet	Ranier Racing with MDM	8	Travis Miller	1
Chevrolet	Ranier Racing with MDM	28	Kyle Benjamin	4
Chevrolet	Ranier Racing with MDM	28	Matt Tifft	1
Chevrolet	Ranier Racing with MDM	28	Michael Self	1
Chevrolet	Tyler Audie Racing	12	Tyler Audie	2
Chevrolet	Wayne Peterson Racing	00	Wayne Peterson	9
Chevrolet	Wayne Peterson Racing	00	Dale Matchett	2
Chevrolet	Wayne Peterson Racing	00	Bradley Frye	3
Chevrolet	Wayne Peterson Racing	00	Dale Shearer	1
Chevrolet	Wayne Peterson Racing	00	Mark Meunier	1
Chevrolet	Wayne Peterson Racing	31	Brad Smith	1
Dodge	Brett Hudson Motorsports (Note: It was a Brett Hudson Motorsports entry using Venturini Motorsports' owner points.)	15	Brett Hudson	2
Dodge	Carter 2 Motorsports	97	Alx Danielsson	1
Dodge	ESP Motorsports (Note: It was an ESP Motorsports entry using Roulo Brothers Racing's owner points.)	17	Gene Paul	2
Dodge	Hamilton-Hughes Racing	4	Bobby Hamilton Jr.	1
Dodge	Hamilton-Hughes Racing	63	Ray Ciccarelli	2
Dodge	Hauck Enterprises Inc.	31	Richard Hauck	4
Dodge	Universe Racing	37	Steve Fox	1
Ford	Universe Racing	3	Steve Fox	1
Ford	Max Force Racing (Note: It was a Max Force Racing entry using Bobby Gerhart Racing's owner points.)	5	Chris Bailey Jr.	2
Ford	Cunningham Motorsports	99	Austin Cindric	4
Ford	Dale Shearer Racing	73	Dale Shearer	3
Ford	Empire Racing	18	Bret Holmes	1
Ford	Empire Racing	82	Dylan Lupton	1
Ford	Fast Track Racing	1	Rick Tackman	1
Ford	Fast Track Racing	1	Ed Pompa	1
Ford	Goodson Racing	1	Kyle Plott	2
Ford	James Hylton Motorsports	49	Brad Smith	1
Ford	Kimmel Racing	68	Dale Shearer	1
Ford	Kimmel Racing	68	Barry Layne	1
Ford	Lira Motorsports	36	Brandon Lynn (R)	4
Ford	Lira Motorsports	36	Michael Lira	2
Ford	Lira Motorsports	38	Gray Gaulding	1
Ford	Lira Motorsports	38	Sheldon Creed	6
Ford	Lira Motorsports	38	Ryan Reed	1
Ford	Lira Motorsports	58	Kyle Weatherman	8
Ford	Lira Motorsports	59	Jairo Avila Jr.	1
Ford	Lira Motorsports	59	Travis Swaim	1
Ford	Lira Motorsports	59	Tyler McQuarrie	1
Ford	Lira Motorsports	59	Korbin Forrister	1
Ford	Lira Motorsports	93	Clayton Weatherman	1
Ford	Minghenelli Racing	24	Steve Minghenelli	1
Ford	Mystic Motorsports	07	Brian Kaltreider	2
Ford	Roulo Brothers Racing	17	Ty Majeski	4
Ford	Team Stange Racing	46	Frank Kimmel	1
Toyota	Chad Finley Racing	51	Chad Finley	4
Toyota	Hendren Motorsports	24	Ryan Unzicker	2
Toyota	MBM Motorsports	66	Mark Thompson	1
Toyota	Tom Berte Racing (Note: Entries were fielded in a collaboration with Venturini Motorsports.)	20	Tom Berte	7
Toyota	Venturini Motorsports	15	Cole Williams	1
Toyota	Venturini Motorsports	15	Christopher Bell	4
Toyota	Venturini Motorsports	15	William Byron	1
Toyota	Venturini Motorsports	15	Matt Tifft	1
Toyota	Venturini Motorsports	15	Christian Eckes	3
Toyota	Venturini Motorsports	15	Dakoda Armstrong	1
Toyota	Venturini Motorsports	15	Landon Huffman	1
Toyota	Venturini Motorsports	15	Jake Griffin	1
Toyota	Venturini Motorsports	15	Trista Stevenson	1
Toyota	Venturini Motorsports	15	Zane Smith	1
Toyota	Venturini Motorsports	15	Noah Gragson	1
Toyota	Venturini Motorsports	66	Mark Thompson	2
Toyota	Venturini Motorsports	66	Christian Eckes	1
Toyota	Venturini Motorsports	66	Christopher Bell	1
Toyota	Venturini Motorsports	66	Zane Smith	1
Toyota	Win-Tron Racing	32	Shane Lee (R)	10
Toyota	Win-Tron Racing	33	Austin Wayne Self	1
Toyota	Win-Tron Racing	33	Gus Dean	1
Chevrolet 6 Ford 3	Bobby Gerhart Racing 6 Keselowski-Gerhart Racing 3	5	Bobby Gerhart	6
Chevrolet 6 Ford 3	Bobby Gerhart Racing 6 Keselowski-Gerhart Racing 3	5	Brian Keselowski	3
Chevrolet	Hixson Motorsports (Note: It was a Hixson Motorsports entry using Fast Track Racing's owner points.)	11	Eric Caudell	1
Ford	Fast Track Racing	11	Ed Pompa	4
Ford	Fast Track Racing	11	Dick Doheny	1
Ford	Fast Track Racing	11	Rick Clifton	1
Ford	Max Force Racing (Note: It was a Max Force Racing entry using Fast Track Racing's owner points.)	11	Chris Bailey Jr.	3
Chevrolet 2 Ford 1	Jent Motorsports	85	Dustin Knowles (R)	2
Chevrolet 2 Ford 1	Jent Motorsports	85	Scott Edwards	1
Chevrolet	Bob Schacht Motorsports	5	Benny Chastain	1
Toyota	Bob Schacht Motorsports	75	Bob Schacht	1
Dodge 3 Toyota 7	Crosley Sports Group	42	Bo LeMastus	8
Dodge 3 Toyota 7	Crosley Sports Group	42	Josh Reeves	2
Toyota	Rette Jones Racing	30	Terry Jones	2
Ford	Rette Jones Racing	30	Corey Deuser	1
Ford	Rette Jones Racing	30	Clair Zimmerman	1
Ford	Max Force Racing (Note: It was a Max Force Racing entry using Rette Jones Racing's owner points.)	30	Chris Bailey Jr.	1

== Schedule ==
The 2016 schedule was fully released on November 25, 2015.

No.	Race title	Track	Date
1	Lucas Oil 200 driven by General Tire	Daytona International Speedway, Daytona Beach	February 13
2	Music City 200	Fairgrounds Speedway, Nashville	April 9
3	Kentuckiana Ford Dealers 200	Salem Speedway, Salem	April 24
4	General Tire 200	Talladega Superspeedway, Lincoln	April 29
5	Menards 200 presented by Federated Car Care	Toledo Speedway, Toledo	May 22
6	Twilight 150 Presented by Unique Pretzels	New Jersey Motorsports Park, Millville	May 28
7	General Tire #AnywhereIsPossible 200	Pocono Raceway, Long Pond	June 3
8	Corrigan Oil 200	Michigan International Speedway, Brooklyn	June 10
9	Montgomery Ward Fathers Day 200	Madison International Speedway, Oregon	June 19
10	Herr's Potato Chips 200	Winchester Speedway, Winchester	June 26
11	ABC Supply 150	Iowa Speedway, Newton	July 9
12	Sioux Chief PowerPEX 200	Lucas Oil Raceway, Brownsburg	July 22
13	ModSpace 150	Pocono Raceway, Long Pond	July 29
14	Berlin ARCA 200	Berlin Raceway, Marne	August 6
15	SuperChevyStores.com 100	Illinois State Fairgrounds Racetrack, Springfield	August 21
16	General Tire Grabber 100	DuQuoin State Fairgrounds Racetrack, Du Quoin	September 4
17	Eddie Gilstrap Motors Fall Classic	Salem Speedway, Salem	September 10
18	Scott 150	Chicagoland Speedway, Joliet	September 15
19	Crosley 150	Kentucky Speedway, Sparta	September 23
20	Kansas 150	Kansas Speedway, Kansas City	October 14

=== Television coverage ===
In the United States, ten races were broadcast by Fox Sports on FS1 or FS2. The eight races that were broadcast on FS1 include Daytona, Talladega, both Pocono events, Michigan, Indianapolis, Chicagoland, and Kansas, while Iowa and Kentucky were broadcast on FS2. Nine races were also aired on American Sports Network. The Toledo, Winchester, Berlin, Madison, and Illinois Fairgrounds races were broadcast live, while the Duquoin, Nashville, and both Salem races were shown on tape delay.

== Results and standings ==
=== Races ===
No.	Race	Pole position	Most laps led	Winning driver	Manufacturer	No.	Winning team
1	Lucas Oil 200 driven by General Tire	Cole Custer	Cole Custer	John Wes Townley	Chevrolet	05	Athenian Motorsports
2	Music City 200	Chase Briscoe	John Wes Townley	Josh Williams	Chevrolet	6	Josh Williams Motorsports
3	Kentuckiana Ford Dealers 200	Chase Briscoe	Christopher Bell	Christopher Bell	Toyota	66	Venturini Motorsports
4	General Tire 200	Tom Hessert III	Tom Hessert III	Gus Dean	Chevrolet	98	Mason Mitchell Motorsports
5	Menards 200 presented by Federated Car Care	Chase Briscoe	Chase Briscoe	Myatt Snider	Ford	22	Cunningham Motorsports
6	Twilight 150 Presented by Unique Pretzels	Parker Kligerman	Parker Kligerman	Parker Kligerman	Dodge	22	Cunningham Motorsports
7	General Tire #AnywhereIsPossible 200	Austin Cindric	Myatt Snider	Grant Enfinger	Chevrolet	23	Bret Holmes Racing
8	Corrigan Oil 200	Myatt Snider	Brandon Jones	Brandon Jones	Chevrolet	8	Ranier Racing with MDM
9	Montgomery Ward Fathers Day 200	Chase Briscoe	Kyle Weatherman	Josh Williams	Chevy	6	Josh Williams Motorsports
10	Herr's Potato Chips 200	Chase Briscoe	Chase Briscoe	Chase Briscoe	Ford	77	Cunningham Motorsports
11	ABC Supply 150	Kyle Benjamin	Chase Briscoe	Chase Briscoe	Ford	77	Cunningham Motorsports
12	Sioux Chief PowerPEX 200	Parker Kligerman	Chase Briscoe	Chase Briscoe	Ford	77	Cunningham Motorsports
13	ModSpace 150	Kyle Weatherman	Chase Briscoe	Chase Briscoe	Ford	77	Cunningham Motorsports
14	Berlin ARCA 200	Tom Hessert III	Tom Hessert III	Dalton Sargeant	Toyota	55	Venturini Motorsports
15	SuperChevyStores.com 100	Chase Briscoe	Chase Briscoe	Justin Haley	Chevrolet	98	Mason Mitchell Motorsports
16	General Tire Grabber 100	Grant Enfinger	Tom Hessert III	Tom Hessert III	Toyota	25	Venturini Motorsports
17	Eddie Gilstrap Motors Fall Classic	Chase Briscoe	Chase Briscoe	Christopher Bell	Toyota	15	Venturini Motorsports
18	Scott 150	Shane Lee	Chase Briscoe	Chase Briscoe	Ford	77	Cunningham Motorsports
19	Crosley 150	Chase Briscoe	Chase Briscoe	Austin Cindric	Ford	99	Cunningham Motorsports
20	Kansas 150	Chase Briscoe	Chase Briscoe	Chase Briscoe	Ford	77	Cunningham Motorsports

=== Drivers' championship ===
(key) Bold – Pole position awarded by time. Italics – Pole position set by final practice results or rainout. * – Most laps led.

Pos	Driver	DAY	NSH	SLM	TAL	TOL	NJE	POC	MCH	MAD	WIN	IOW	IRP	POC	BLN	ISF	DSF	SLM	CHI	KEN	KAN	Points
1	Chase Briscoe **(R)**	4	**9**	**16**	3	**4***	4	10	2	**6**	**1***	1*	1*	1*	2	**5***	4	**6***	1	**22**	1*	5290
2	Tom Hessert III	28	12	6	**6***	9	2	15	21	5	5	16	10	8	**7***	6	1	2	10	4	9	4755
3	Matt Kurzejewski	29	13	9	8	5	8	13	8	7	4	6	16	11	3	13	13	7	20	5	6	4585
4	Josh Williams	19	1	13	2	6	6	11	20	1	6	10	4	26	10	16		4	26	6	13	4175
5	Thomas Praytor	14	18	17	16	14	21	20	14	9	11	15	15	21	8	8	9	14	15	14	15	4055
6	Brad Smith	32	30	22	24	23	20	25	19	15	14	22	33	18	13	15	12	17	30	18	21	3445
7	Kyle Weatherman	3	24	4	12	3	7	18	12	2*	3	9		5					4	19	28	3165
8	Dalton Sargeant **(R)**			3	7	2	3	4	9		2	4	20	3	1			12	5	2	12	3040
9	A. J. Fike		2	14		21			7	8	7	12	13		5	2	16	10	12	8	14	2945
10	Mike Basham		20	19		19		28	22	16	13	21	18	16	12	10	15	16	18	16	18	2925
11	Con Nicolopoulos			24		24	24	36	31	20	19	24	28	28	22	21	19	21	28	26	24	2540
12	John Wes Townley	1	4*	7	29			19						2	15	20		5	2	23	7	2650
13	Will Kimmel	18			4		16	29		10	8	18		10		19	11	18				2060
14	Ed Pompa		31		18		13	21		11				13	9		20	15	31	30	17	2010
15	Dustin Knowles **(R)**		23	21	21	18	14	27	25	13	12	19	27	24					19			1930
16	Shane Lee **(R)**	38	16	12	11			14	10					4					**21**	9	8	1615
17	Myatt Snider					1		9*	23			5	3	6					25	25	27	1475
18	Wayne Peterson			25		27	27		32	23	22	28	31		25		21			31	34	1430
19	Bo LeMastus	6	10	15	26	10	19	17	DNS													1380
20	Mike Senica **(R)**		32				22			19	18	23	29		17	22	DNS	20		20	23	1330
21	Bret Holmes		5		9								6		4			3		7	26	1310
22	Sarah Cornett-Ching	11							11			17		9		18		11	11	28		1260
23	Richard Hauck			27		29			27	18	20	25	21		18			19	27			1170
24	Brady Boswell		15	18	10			5	6			13	25									1150
25	Christopher Bell			1*			10							7				1	3			1085
26	Gus Dean	35			**1**	7							9	15						21	25	1060
27	Sheldon Creed		7	20	14	13	11		18													970
28	Chris Bailey Jr.							34	30			27	30	17	23			26	32	32	16	965
29	Tom Berte							23	16			14		20					13	12	31	965
30	Austin Cindric							2											6	1*	2	895
31	Brandon Jones							3	1*										22	29	4	875
32	Kyle Benjamin							6	3			**2**	7									855
33	Nick Higdon								15	21	21								14	11	29	850
34	Dick Doheny	30		26	34			35	26		15						23	24				800
35	Justin Haley			2				7					22			1						780
36	Bobby Gerhart	37			20			16					11	27					16			750
37	Ty Majeski									4			12						8		11	750
38	Eric Caudell	DNQ	26								16				20	14					19	700
39	Dale Shearer	25														11	18	23	33		30	680
40	Christian Eckes		8							14		11	26									625
41	Brandon Lynn **(R)**	16	6	8	32																	610
42	Mason Mitchell											8					6				10	570
43	Rick Clifton		22				18						19							15		550
44	David Sear								24			20		19						17		520
45	Brian Finney		3			17							14									520
46	Steve Fox	20		28			23	33						25								505
47	Chase Storch			30		28	26			22	23											505
48	Scott Reeves		11			11							17									500
49	Willie Mullins	8			17		15															490
50	Chad Finley								13				5						23			485
51	Brian Keselowski		28	10		9																460
52	Parker Kligerman						**1***						**8**									450
53	Sean Corr	27			5									12								435
54	Ken Schrader															4	3					430
55	Josh Reeves									17	10	26										425
56	Matt Tifft							5												3		425
57	Ryan Unzicker															3	5					425
58	Michael Lira					12			29								14					415
59	William Byron	2						8														415
60	Morgen Baird								17										17		22	410
61	Travis Braden								4										7			405
62	Grant Enfinger							1									**17***					400
63	Cole Custer	10										7										390
64	Tyler Speer															7	7					390
65	Kelly Kovski															17	2					375
66	Mark Thompson	33			19															10		370
67	Frank Kimmel	5																13				370
68	Cory Howard	23													19	23						365
69	Dylan Martin		19										23						24			360
70	Kevin Thomas Jr. **(R)**	7	17																			345
71	Bryan Dauzat	15			15																35	330
72	Brett Hudson	13			13																	320
73	Clayton Weatherman		14												14							320
74	Ray Ciccarelli	DNQ	33					26					24									300
75	Dale Matchett						25	31						23								295
76	Zane Smith																	9		24		295
77	Mark Meunier														21					27	33	285
78	Noah Gragson							30													5	285
79	Brian Kaltreider							22						14								280
80	Billy Alger			31									32		24							255
81	Rick Tackman									12									29			255
82	Cole Williams		25			16																255
83	Tyler Audie	12			30																	250
84	Bradley Frye																22	25				250
85	Gene Paul	21			23																	240
86	Codie Rohrbaugh																			13	32	235
87	Travis Miller												2									225
88	Nicole Behar									3												215
89	Harrison Burton											3										215
90	Michael Self																				3	215
91	George Cushman				27			24														205
92	Blake Jones			5																		205
93	David Levine						5															205
94	Kyle Plott		29	23																		200
95	Clair Zimmerman														6							200
96	Jeffery MacZink					26			28													190
97	Don Thompson							32						22								190
98	Joe Cooksey																8					190
99	Mason Mingus																	8				190
100	Dakoda Armstrong										9											185
101	Gray Gaulding	9																				185
102	Jake Griffin																9					185
103	Steve Minghenelli						9															185
104	Brent Sherman																		9			185
105	Trista Stevenson																10					180
106	Quinnton Bear														11							175
107	Tyler McQuarrie			11																		175
108	Ryan Reed							12														170
109	Bob Schacht						12															170
110	Tanner Thorson															12						170
111	Tim Viens	26			35																	155
112	Austin Nemire					15																155
113	Kevin Hinckle											DNS									20	155
114	Landon Huffman														16							150
115	Barry Layne		34	29																		145
116	Benny Chastain						17															145
117	Corey Deuser										17											145
118	Michael Whipple																	22				145
119	Frank Jiovani					20																130
120	Bobby Hamilton Jr.	DNQ			25																	130
121	Alx Danielsson		21																			125
122	Terry Jones	40			28																	120
123	John Ferrier	22																				120
124	Korbin Forrister				22																	120
125	Jake Francis					22																120
126	Dylan Lupton	24																				110
127	Mat Vainner					25																105
128	Travis Swaim		27																			95
129	Joey Gattina	DNQ			33																	90
130	Derrick Lancaster	31																				75
131	Andy Seuss				31																	75
132	Cole Powell	34																				60
133	Austin Wayne Self	36																				50
134	Jairo Avila Jr.	39																				35
	Ronnie Osmer			DNS																		25
	Russ Dugger	DNQ																				25
	J. J. Pack	DNQ																				25

== See also ==
- 2016 NASCAR Sprint Cup Series
- 2016 NASCAR Xfinity Series
- 2016 NASCAR Camping World Truck Series
- 2016 NASCAR K&N Pro Series East
- 2016 NASCAR K&N Pro Series West
- 2016 NASCAR Whelen Modified Tour
- 2016 NASCAR Whelen Southern Modified Tour
- 2016 NASCAR Pinty's Series
- 2016 NASCAR Whelen Euro Series
- 2016 ARCA Truck Series
