= Josh Reeves =

American racing driver

- Born: Joshua Reeves; November 6, 1992 (age 34); Bassett, Virginia, U.S.

NASCAR FedEx Freight Truck Series career
- 1 race run over 1 year
- 2016 position: 72nd
- Best finish: 72nd (2016)
- First race: 2016 Texas Roadhouse 200 (Martinsville)
Wins	Top tens	Poles
0	0	0

Joshua Reeves (born November 6, 1992) is an American professional stock car racing driver. He last competed part-time in the NASCAR Camping World Truck Series, driving the No. 66 for Mike Harmon Racing.

== Motorsports career results ==
=== NASCAR ===
(key) (Bold – Pole position awarded by qualifying time. Italics – Pole position earned by points standings or practice time. * – Most laps led.)

==== Camping World Truck Series ====
NASCAR Camping World Truck Series results
Year	Team	No.	Make	1	2	3	4	5	6	7	8	9	10	11	12	13	14	15	16	17	18	19	20	21	22	23	NCWTC	Pts	Ref
2016	Mike Harmon Racing	66	Chevy	DAY	ATL	MAR	KAN	DOV	CLT	TEX	IOW	GTW	KEN	ELD	POC	BRI	MCH	MSP	CHI	NHA	LVS	TAL	MAR; 28	TEX	PHO	HOM	72nd	5	

=== ARCA Racing Series ===
(key) (Bold – Pole position awarded by qualifying time. Italics – Pole position earned by points standings or practice time. * – Most laps led.)

ARCA Racing Series results
Year	Team	No.	Make	1	2	3	4	5	6	7	8	9	10	11	12	13	14	15	16	17	18	19	20	ARSC	Pts	Ref
2014	Carter 2 Motorsports	40	Dodge	DAY	MOB	SLM	TAL	TOL	NJM	POC	MCH	ELK	WIN	CHI	IRP	POC	BLN	ISF	MAD	DSF	SLM; 23	KEN	KAN	123rd	115	
2016	Crosley Sports Group	42	Toyota	DAY	NSH	SLM	TAL	TOL	NJM	POC	MCH	MAD; 17	WIN; 10											55th	425	
2016	Danny Glad Racing	56	Chevy											IOW; 26	IRP	POC	BLN	ISF	DSF	SLM	CHI	KEN	KAN	55th	425	

=== CARS Super Late Model Tour ===
(key)

CARS Super Late Model Tour results
Year	Team	No.	Make	1	2	3	4	5	6	7	8	CSLMTC	Pts	Ref
2019	Wade Lopez	96R	Ford	SNM	HCY	NSH	MMS; 20	BRI	HCY	ROU	SBO	48th	13	
