= Scott Reeves (racing driver) =

American racing driver (born 1966)

- Born: January 28, 1966 (age 60); Royal Palm Beach, Florida, U.S.

ARCA Menards Series career
- 8 races run over 6 years
- Best finish: 48th (2016)
- First race: 2015 Sioux Chief PowerPEX 200 (Indianapolis)
- Last race: 2021 Lucas Oil 200 (Daytona)
Wins	Top tens	Poles
0	0	0
- Statistics up to date as of January 30, 2025.

Scott Reeves (born January 28, 1966) is an American professional stock car racing driver who has previously competed in the ARCA Menards Series from 2015 to 2021.

Reeves has also competed in series such as the FASCAR Sunbelt Super Late Model Series, the Florida Pro Series, the FASCAR Pro Truck Series, and the World Series of Asphalt Stock Car Racing.

== Motorsports results ==
=== ARCA Menards Series ===
(key) (Bold – Pole position awarded by qualifying time. Italics – Pole position earned by points standings or practice time. * – Most laps led.)

ARCA Menards Series results
Year	Team	No.	Make	1	2	3	4	5	6	7	8	9	10	11	12	13	14	15	16	17	18	19	20	AMSC	Pts	Ref
2015	Finney Racing Enterprises	80	Chevy	DAY	MOB	NSH	SLM	TAL	TOL	NJE	POC	MCH	CHI	WIN	IOW	IRP; 20	POC	BLN	ISF	DSF	SLM	KEN	KAN	112th	130	
2016	Finney Racing Enterprises	80	Chevy	DAY	NSH; 11	SLM	TAL	TOL; 11	NJE	POC	MCH	MAD	WIN	IOW	IRP; 17	POC	BLN	ISF	DSF	SLM	CHI	KEN	KAN	48th	500	
2017	Finney Racing Enterprises	04	Chevy	DAY	NSH; 14	SLM	TAL	TOL; Wth	ELK	POC	MCH	MAD	IOW	IRP	POC	WIN	ISF	ROA	DSF	SLM	CHI	KEN	KAN	87th	185	
2018	Finney Racing Enterprises	69	Chevy	DAY; 17	NSH	SLM	TAL	TOL	CLT	POC	MCH	MAD	GTW	CHI	IOW	ELK	POC	ISF	BLN	DSF	SLM	IRP	KAN	94th	145	
2020	Reeves Racing	88	Chevy	DAY; 33	PHO	TAL	POC	IRP	KEN	IOW	KAN	TOL	TOL	MCH	DAY	GTW	L44	TOL	BRI	WIN	MEM	ISF	KAN	90th	11	
2021	Reeves Racing	88	Chevy	DAY; 24	PHO	TAL	KAN	TOL	CLT	MOH	POC	ELK	BLN	IOW	WIN	GLN	MCH	ISF	MLW	DSF	BRI	SLM	KAN	111th	20	
