= Dustin Knowles =

American racing driver

- Born: March 23, 1985 (age 41); Trussville, Alabama, U.S.

ARCA Menards Series career
- 14 races run over 2 years
- Best finish: 15th (2016)
- First race: 2014 ARCA Mobile 200 (Mobile)
- Last race: 2016 Scott 150 (Chicagoland)
Wins	Top tens	Poles
0	0	0
- Statistics up to date as of January 22, 2025.

Dustin Knowles (born March 23, 1985) is an American professional stock car racing driver who has previously competed in the ARCA Racing Series from 2014 to 2016.

Knowles also competed in the ASA Late Model Series Southern Division and the Modifieds of Mayhem Tour.

== Motorsports results ==
=== ARCA Racing Series ===
(key) (Bold – Pole position awarded by qualifying time. Italics – Pole position earned by points standings or practice time. * – Most laps led.)

ARCA Racing Series results
Year	Team	No.	Make	1	2	3	4	5	6	7	8	9	10	11	12	13	14	15	16	17	18	19	20	ARSC	Pts	Ref
2014	Carter 2 Motorsports	40	Dodge	DAY	MOB; 15	SLM	TAL	TOL	NJE	POC	MCH	ELK	WIN	CHI	IRP	POC	BLN	ISF	MAD	DSF	SLM	KEN	KAN	101st	155	
2016	Jent Motorsports	14	Chevy	DAY	NSH; 23	SLM; 21	TAL; 21	TOL; 18	NJE; 14	POC; 27	MCH; 25	MAD; 13	WIN; 12	IOW; 19	IRP; 27	POC; 24	BLN; Wth	ISF						15th	1930	
2016	Jent Motorsports	85	Chevy																DSF; Wth	SLM; Wth				15th	1930	
2016	Jent Motorsports	14	Ford																		CHI; 19	KEN	KAN	15th	1930	
