= Richard Hauck =

American racing driver

- Born: January 23, 1963 (age 63); Howell, Michigan, U.S.

ARCA Menards Series career
- 28 races run over 6 years
- Best finish: 23rd (2016)
- First race: 2010 Fall Classic 200 (Salem)
- Last race: 2017 Crosley Brands 150 (Kentucky)
Wins	Top tens	Poles
0	0	0
- Statistics up to date as of February 5, 2025.

Richard Hauck (born January 23, 1963) is an American professional stock car racing driver who has previously competed in the ARCA Racing Series from 1992 to 2017.

Hauck has previously competed in the Super Cup Stock Car Series.

== Motorsports results ==
=== ARCA Racing Series ===
(key) (Bold – Pole position awarded by qualifying time. Italics – Pole position earned by points standings or practice time. * – Most laps led.)

ARCA Racing Series results
Year	Team	No.	Make	1	2	3	4	5	6	7	8	9	10	11	12	13	14	15	16	17	18	19	20	21	ARSC	Pts	Ref
1992	Hauck Enterprises Inc.	31	Olds	DAY	FIF	TWS	TAL	TOL	KIL	POC	MCH	FRS	KIL	NSH	DEL	POC	HPT	FRS	ISF	TOL	DSF	TWS	SLM; 22	ATL	N/A	0	
1994	Hauck Enterprises Inc.	31	Olds	DAY	TAL	FIF	LVL	KIL	TOL	FRS	MCH	DMS	POC	POC	KIL	FRS; 25	INF	I70	ISF	DSF	TOL; 19	SLM; 29	WIN	ATL	N/A	0	
1995	Hauck Enterprises Inc.	31	Olds	DAY	ATL	TAL	FIF	KIL	FRS; 23	MCH	I80	MCS; DNQ	FRS; 26	POC	POC	KIL	FRS; 24	SBS; 22	LVL	ISF	DSF	SLM; 21	WIN; 26	ATL	49th	620	
2015	Hauck Enterprises Inc.	31	Dodge	DAY	MOB	NSH	SLM	TAL	TOL; 24	NJE	POC	MCH		WIN; 14	IOW	IRP; 24	POC	BLN; 20	ISF	DSF	SLM; 26	KEN	KAN; 28		32nd	725	
2015	James Hylton Motorsports	49	Ford										CHI; 31												32nd	725	
2016	Hauck Enterprises Inc.	31	Dodge	DAY	NSH	SLM; 27	TAL	TOL; Wth	NJE	POC	MCH; Wth									SLM; 19	CHI; 27	KEN; Wth	KAN		23rd	1170	
2016	Hixson Motorsports	64	Chevy					TOL; 29																	23rd	1170	
2016	Wayne Peterson Racing	0	Chevy								MCH; 27	MAD; 18	WIN; 20	IOW; 25											23rd	1170	
2016	Wayne Peterson Racing	0	Dodge												IRP; 21	POC	BLN; 18	ISF	DSF						23rd	1170	
2017	Hixson Motorsports	3	Chevy	DAY	NSH	SLM	TAL	TOL	ELK	POC	MCH	MAD	IOW	IRP	POC	WIN	ISF	ROA	DSF	SLM	CHI	KEN; 29	KAN		121st	25	
