= Clayton Weatherman =

American racing driver (born 1999)

- Born: June 5, 1999 (age 27); Wentzville, Missouri, U.S.

ARCA Menards Series career
- 6 races run over 4 years
- First race: 2014 Federated Car Care ARCA Fall Classic (Salem)
- Last race: 2023 Southern Illinois 100 (DuQuoin)
Wins	Top tens	Poles
0	1	0
- Statistics up to date as of May 9, 2024.

Clayton Weatherman (born June 5, 1999) is an American professional stock car racing driver who last competed part-time in the ARCA Menards Series, driving the No. 10 Toyota for Fast Track Racing.

== Racing career ==
From 2011 to 2013, Weatherman competed in select races in the SRL Legends Tour, winning two races at the Las Vegas Motor Speedway Bullring in 2011 and 2013.

In 2014, Weatherman attempted to make his ARCA Racing Series debut at Salem Speedway, driving the No. 1 Dodge for the family-owned Weatherman Motorsports, where he would be classified in 30th after not starting the race. He would then run three more races with the team the following year, this time in the No. 10 Ford, a ride that he would share with his brother Kyle, finishing eighth at Salem, eleventh at Winchester Speedway, and fifteenth at Lucas Oil Raceway.

In 2016, Weatherman would join Lira Motorsports at Nashville Fairgrounds Speedway in the No. 93 Ford, having tested with the team near the end of 2015. After starting fifteenth, he would go on to finish three laps down in fourteenth. He would then join Cunningham Motorsports at Berlin Raceway, driving the No. 22 Ford. After starting fifth, he would be involved in a multi-car crash late in the race and would once again finish fourteenth.

In 2023, it was revealed that Weatherman would make his return to the now ARCA Menards Series at the DuQuoin State Fairgrounds dirt track, driving the No. 10 Toyota for Fast Track Racing.

== Personal life ==
Weatherman is the younger brother of current NASCAR Xfinity Series driver Kyle Weatherman.

== Motorsports results ==
=== ARCA Menards Series ===
(key) (Bold – Pole position awarded by qualifying time. Italics – Pole position earned by points standings or practice time. * – Most laps led.)

ARCA Menards Series results
Year	Team	No.	Make	1	2	3	4	5	6	7	8	9	10	11	12	13	14	15	16	17	18	19	20	AMSC	Pts	Ref
2014	Weatherman Motorsports	1	Dodge	DAY	MOB	SLM	TAL	TOL	NJE	POC	MCH	ELK	WIN	CHI	IRP	POC	BLN	ISF	MAD	DSF	SLM; 30	KEN	KAN	147th	25	
2015	Weatherman Motorsports	10	Ford	DAY	MOB	NSH	SLM; 8	TAL	TOL	NJE	POC	MCH	CHI	WIN; 11	IOW	IRP; 15	POC	BLN	ISF	DSF	SLM	KEN	KAN	44th	520	
2016	Lira Motorsports	93	Ford	DAY	NSH; 14	SLM	TAL	TOL	NJE	POC	MCH	MAD	WIN	IOW	IRP	POC								73rd	320	
2016	Cunningham Motorsports	22	Ford														BLN; 14	ISF	DSF	SLM	CHI	KEN	KAN	73rd	320	
2023	Fast Track Racing	10	Toyota	DAY	PHO	TAL	KAN	CLT	BLN	ELK	MOH	IOW	POC	MCH	IRP	GLN	ISF	MLW	DSF; 16	KAN	BRI	SLM	TOL	98th	28	
