= Joey Gattina =

American racing driver

- Born: August 18, 1979 (age 47); Alabaster, Alabama, U.S.

NASCAR FedEx Freight Truck Series career
- 1 race run over 1 year
- 2015 position: NA
- First race: 2015 American Ethanol Presents the Drivin' for Linemen 200 (Gateway)
Wins	Top tens	Poles
0	0	0

Joey Gattina (born July 14, 1979) is an American former professional stock car racing driver. He last competed part-time in the ARCA Racing Series, driving the No. 06 for Wayne Peterson Racing.

== Biography ==
A driving instructor for Dale Jarrett Racing Adventure, Gattina conducts test drives at tracks like Talladega Superspeedway. He raced at the track in the ARCA Racing Series in 2014 and 2016.

In 2015, Gattina made his NASCAR Camping World Truck Series debut at Gateway. He started and finished last after his truck's engine expired before he could complete a lap.

== Motorsports career results ==
=== NASCAR ===
(key) (Bold – Pole position awarded by qualifying time. Italics – Pole position earned by points standings or practice time. * – Most laps led.)

==== Camping World Truck Series ====
NASCAR Camping World Truck Series results
Year	Team	No.	Make	1	2	3	4	5	6	7	8	9	10	11	12	13	14	15	16	17	18	19	20	21	22	23	NCWTC	Pts	Ref
2015	Norm Benning Racing	57	Chevy	DAY	ATL	MAR	KAN	CLT	DOV	TEX	GTW; 32	IOW	KEN	ELD	POC	MCH	BRI	MSP	CHI	NHA	LVS	TAL	MAR	TEX	PHO	HOM	NA	-	

=== ARCA Racing Series ===
(key) (Bold – Pole position awarded by qualifying time. Italics – Pole position earned by points standings or practice time. * – Most laps led.)

ARCA Racing Series results
Year	Team	No.	Make	1	2	3	4	5	6	7	8	9	10	11	12	13	14	15	16	17	18	19	20	ARSC	Pts	Ref
2014	Wayne Peterson Racing	06	Chevy	DAY	MOB; 21	SLM	TAL; 31	TOL	NJE	POC	MCH	ELK	WIN	CHI	IRP	POC	BLN	ISF	MAD	DSF	SLM	KEN	KAN	79th	200	
2016	Jent Motorsports	14	Chevy	DAY; DNQ	NSH	SLM																		129th	90	
2016	Wayne Peterson Racing	06	Chevy				TAL; 33	TOL	NJE	POC	MCH	MAD	WIN	IOW	IRP	POC	BLN	ISF	DSF	SLM	CHI	KEN	KAN	129th	90	
