= Kevin Hinckle =

American racing driver

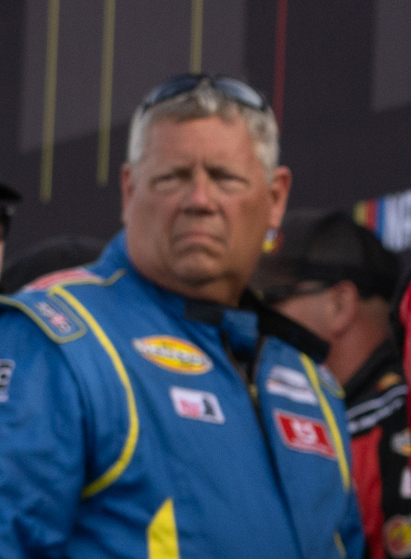
- Hinckle at the ARCA race at Iowa Speedway in 2024
- Born: September 12, 1961 (age 65); Shawnee, Kansas, U.S.

ARCA Menards Series career
- 19 races run over 8 years
- Best finish: 41st (2023)
- First race: 2015 Corrigan Oil 200 (Michigan)
- Last race: 2025 Reese's 150 (Kansas)
| Wins | Top tens | Poles |
|---|---|---|
| 0 | 0 | 0 |

ARCA Menards Series East career
- 1 race run over 1 year
- Best finish: 54th (2024)
- First race: 2024 Atlas 150 (Iowa)
| Wins | Top tens | Poles |
|---|---|---|
| 0 | 0 | 0 |
- Statistics up to date as of September 26, 2025.

Kevin Hinckle (born September 12, 1961) is an American professional stock car racing driver who last competed part-time in the ARCA Menards Series, driving the No. 0 Chevrolet for Wayne Peterson Racing.

== Racing career ==
In 2015, Hinckle would make his ARCA Racing Series debut at Michigan International Speedway, driving the No. 95 Dodge for Carter 2 Motorsports. After finishing 18th in the sole practice session, he would officially start 18th due to qualifying being rained out, and was running as high as fifteenth in the race before an engine failure six laps in the event forced him to retire the car. He would be classified in the 24th position. He would return with the team for the following race at Chicagoland Speedway, where he would finish 30th after failing to start due to engine issues. He was originally scheduled to run the races at Iowa Speedway and Kansas Speedway for the team, although this would not materialize.

In 2016, Hinckle would run the No. 69 Ford for Kimmel Racing at Iowa, where he would start and finish 29th after failing to take the start. He would return with the team at Kansas, where he would start sixteenth and finish eight laps down in twentieth. For the following year, he would run three races for Higdon Racing in the No. 08 Ford, getting a best finish of 21st at Kansas. He would return with Kimmel Racing in 2018, driving the No. 69 at Talladega Superspeedway, where he would finish 30th after running two laps due to brake issues, and driving the No. 68 at Kansas, where he would finish nineteenth after being involved in a crash with Sheldon Creed.

After not competing in the series for the next three years, Hinckle would return in 2022, running at Kansas Speedway driving the No. 06 Toyota for Wayne Peterson Racing, where he would qualify eighteenth and finish sixteenth in the race due to oil pressure issues. He would return with the team the following year in the No. 0 Ford for Talladega Superspeedway, this time starting 22nd due to ARCA reverting to the owner standings from the following year to determine the starting lineup, but would finish 30th after being involved in a multi-car crash when Jason Kitzmiller's transmission locked up on a restart on lap 23. He would return the following race at Kansas, this time in a Toyota, where he would start 23rd and finish nine laps down in 21st. He would also run the season's second Kansas race, where he would finish sixteenth. Hinckle returned to the No. 06 in 2024, finishing 21st in the first Kansas race, seventeenth at Iowa, and 26th in the second Kansas race. The race at Iowa, being a combination with the main series, would be his ARCA Menards Series East debut.

== Personal life ==
Outside of racing, Hinckle is an instructor for The Racing Experience, and is the owner of KH Automotive.

== Motorsports career results ==
=== ARCA Menards Series ===
(key) (Bold – Pole position awarded by qualifying time. Italics – Pole position earned by points standings or practice time. * – Most laps led.)

ARCA Menards Series results
| Year | Team | No. | Make | 1 | 2 | 3 | 4 | 5 | 6 | 7 | 8 | 9 | 10 | 11 | 12 | 13 | 14 | 15 | 16 | 17 | 18 | 19 | 20 | AMSC | Pts | Ref |
|---|---|---|---|---|---|---|---|---|---|---|---|---|---|---|---|---|---|---|---|---|---|---|---|---|---|---|
| 2015 | Carter 2 Motorsports | 95 | Dodge | DAY | MOB | NSH | SLM | TAL | TOL | NJE | POC | MCH; 24 | CHI; 30 | WIN | IOW | IRP | POC | BLN | ISF | DSF | SLM | KEN | KAN | 92nd | 190 | |
| 2016 | Kimmel Racing | 69 | Ford | DAY | NSH | SLM | TAL | TOL | NJE | POC | MCH | MAD | WIN | IOW; 29 | IRP; 20 | POC | BLN | ISF | DSF | SLM | CHI | KEN | KAN | 111th | 155 | |
| 2017 | Higdon Racing | 08 | Ford | DAY | NSH | SLM | TAL | TOL | ELK | POC | MCH | MAD | IOW; 21 | IRP; 29 | POC | WIN | ISF | ROA | DSF | SLM | CHI | KEN | KAN; 21 | 58th | 335 | |
| 2018 | Kimmel Racing | 69 | Ford | DAY | NSH | SLM | TAL; 30 | TOL | CLT | POC | MCH | MAD | GTW | CHI | IOW | ELK | POC | ISF | BLN | DSF | SLM | IRP | | 68th | 275 | |
| 2018 | Kimmel Racing | 68 | Ford | | | | | | | | | | | | | | | | | | | | KAN; 19 | 68th | 275 | |
| 2022 | Wayne Peterson Racing | 06 | Toyota | DAY | PHO | TAL | KAN | CLT | IOW | BLN | ELK | MOH | POC | IRP | MCH | GLN | ISF | MLW | DSF | KAN; 16 | BRI | SLM | TOL | 95th | 28 | |
| 2023 | Wayne Peterson Racing | 0 | Ford | DAY | PHO | TAL; 30 | | | | | | | | | | | | | | | | | | 41st | 95 | |
| 2023 | Wayne Peterson Racing | 0 | Toyota | | | | KAN; 21 | CLT | BLN | ELK | MOH | IOW | POC | MCH | IRP | GLN | ISF | MLW | DSF | | | | | 41st | 95 | |
| 2023 | Wayne Peterson Racing | 06 | Chevy | | | | | | | | | | | | | | | | | KAN; 16 | BRI | | | 41st | 95 | |
| 2023 | Wayne Peterson Racing | 06 | Toyota | | | | | | | | | | | | | | | | | | | SLM; 14 | TOL | 41st | 95 | |
| 2024 | Wayne Peterson Racing | 06 | Ford | DAY | PHO | TAL | DOV | KAN; 21 | CLT | | | | | | | | | | | | | KAN; 26 | TOL | 55th | 68 | |
| 2024 | Wayne Peterson Racing | 06 | Toyota | | | | | | | IOW; 17 | MOH | BLN | IRP | SLM | ELK | MCH | ISF | MLW | DSF | GLN | BRI | | | 55th | 68 | |
| 2025 | Wayne Peterson Racing | 0 | Chevy | DAY | PHO | TAL | KAN; 17 | CLT | MCH | BLN | ELK | LRP | DOV | IRP | IOW | GLN | ISF | MAD | DSF | BRI | SLM | KAN; 28 | TOL | 88th | 43 | |

==== ARCA Menards Series East ====
ARCA Menards Series East results
| Year | Team | No. | Make | 1 | 2 | 3 | 4 | 5 | 6 | 7 | 8 | AMSEC | Pts | Ref |
|---|---|---|---|---|---|---|---|---|---|---|---|---|---|---|
| 2024 | Wayne Peterson Racing | 06 | Toyota | FIF | DOV | NSV | FRS | IOW; 17 | IRP | MLW | BRI | 54th | 27 | |
