= Steve Fox (racing driver) =

American racing driver

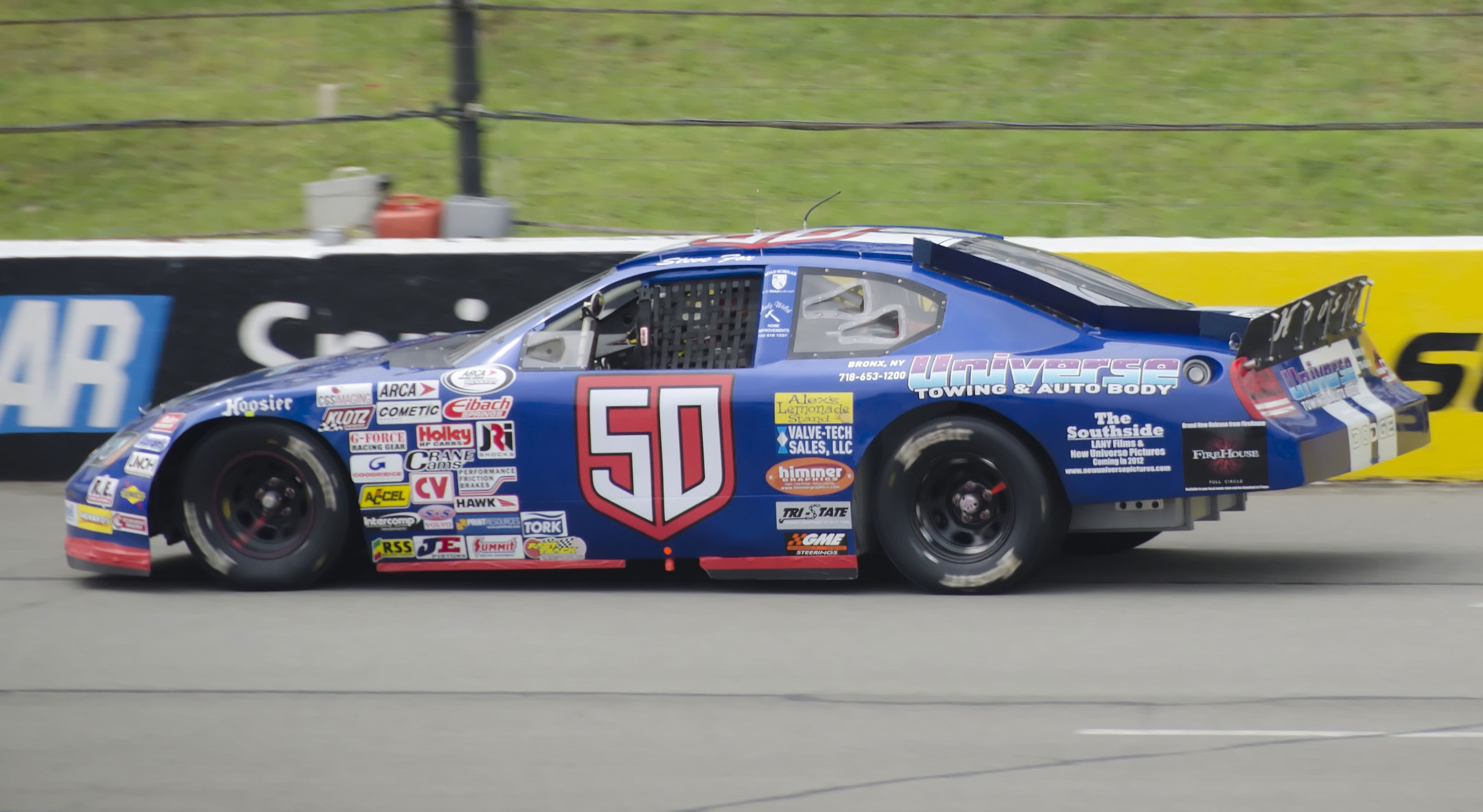
- Fox's No. 50 ARCA car at Pocono Raceway in 2011
- Born: March 23, 1957 (age 69); Hazleton, Pennsylvania, U.S.

ARCA Menards Series career
- 23 races run over 11 years
- Best finish: 46th (2016)
- First race: 2008 Pocono 200 (Pocono)
- Last race: 2018 ModSpace 150 (Pocono)
Wins	Top tens	Poles
0	0	0
- Statistics up to date as of July 7, 2023.

Steve Fox (born March 23, 1957) is an American professional stock car racing driver who has previously competed in the ARCA Racing Series. He has primarily ran at Pocono Raceway, where his best finish was twelfth in 2015, and his most recent start to date coming in 2018.

== Motorsports results ==
=== NASCAR ===
(key) (Bold – Pole position awarded by qualifying time. Italics – Pole position earned by points standings or practice time. * – Most laps led.)

==== Camping World Truck Series ====
NASCAR Camping World Truck Series results
Year	Team	No.	Make	1	2	3	4	5	6	7	8	9	10	11	12	13	14	15	16	17	18	19	20	21	22	23	NCWTC	Pts	Ref
2015	Norm Benning Racing	57	Chevy	DAY	ATL	MAR	KAN	CLT	DOV	TEX	GTW	IOW	KEN	ELD	POC; Wth	MCH	BRI	MSP	CHI	NHA	LVS	TAL	MAR	TEX	PHO	HOM	NA	-	

=== ARCA Racing Series ===
(key) (Bold – Pole position awarded by qualifying time. Italics – Pole position earned by points standings or practice time. * – Most laps led.)

ARCA Racing Series results
Year	Team	No.	Make	1	2	3	4	5	6	7	8	9	10	11	12	13	14	15	16	17	18	19	20	21	ARSC	Pts	Ref
2008	Hixson Motorsports	29	Chevy	DAY	SLM	IOW	KEN	CAR	KEN	TOL	POC; 28	MCH	CAY	KEN	BLN	POC	NSH	ISF	DSF	CHI	SLM	NJE	TAL	TOL	134th	90	
2009	Hixson Motorsports	28	Chevy	DAY	SLM	CAR	TAL	KEN	TOL	POC	MCH	MFD	IOW	KEN	BLN	POC; 25	ISF	CHI	TOL	DSF	NJE	SLM	KAN	CAR	136th	105	
2010	Universe Racing	28	Dodge	DAY	PBE	SLM	TEX	TAL	TOL	POC; 22	MCH	IOW	MFD	POC; 31	BLN	NJE	ISF	CHI	DSF	TOL	SLM	KAN	CAR		87th	195	
2011	Wayne Peterson Racing	06	Chevy	DAY	TAL	SLM	TOL	NJE	CHI	POC; 29	MCH	WIN	BLN	IOW	IRP										82nd	235	
2011	Universe Racing	50	Dodge													POC; 16	ISF	MAD	DSF	SLM	KAN	TOL			82nd	235	
2012	Universe Racing	3	Dodge	DAY	MOB	SLM	TAL	TOL	ELK	POC; 15	MCH	WIN					POC; 23	BLN	ISF	MAD	SLM	DSF	KAN		61st	355	
2012	Wayne Peterson Racing	0	Ford										NJE; 29	IOW	CHI	IRP									61st	355	
2013	Hixson Motorsports	3	Chevy	DAY	MOB	SLM	TAL	TOL	ELK	POC; 34	MCH	ROA	WIN	CHI											122nd	135	
2013	Wayne Peterson Racing	0	Chevy												NJM; 24										122nd	135	
2013	Hixson Motorsports	3	Dodge													POC; 36	BLN	ISF	MAD	DSF	IOW	SLM	KEN	KAN	122nd	135	
2014	Roulo Brothers Racing	99	Ford	DAY	MOB	SLM	TAL	TOL	NJE; 27																77th	210	
2014	Wayne Peterson Racing	06	Ford							POC; 23	MCH	ELK	WIN	CHI	IRP	POC	BLN	ISF	MAD	DSF	SLM	KEN	KAN		77th	210	
2015	Universe Racing	3	Dodge	DAY	MOB	NSH	SLM	TAL	TOL	NJE	POC; 17	MCH	CHI	WIN	IOW	IRP	POC; 12	BLN	ISF	DSF	SLM	KEN	KAN		74th	315	
2016	Universe Racing	3	Ford	DAY; 20	NSH																				46th	505	
2016	Hixson Motorsports	2	Chevy			SLM; 28	TAL	TOL																	46th	505	
2016	Hixson Motorsports	64	Chevy						NJE; 23	POC; 33	MCH	MAD	WIN	IOW	IRP	POC; 25	BLN	ISF	DSF	SLM	CHI	KEN	KAN		46th	505	
2017	Hixson Motorsports	3	Chevy	DAY	NSH	SLM; 22	TAL	TOL	ELK																68th	270	
2017	Universe Racing	3	Chevy							POC; 34	MCH	MAD	IOW	IRP	POC; 21	WIN	ISF	ROA	DSF	SLM	CHI	KEN	KAN		68th	270	
2018	Universe Racing	3	Chevy	DAY	NSH	SLM	TAL	TOL	CLT	POC; 19	MCH	MAD	GTW	CHI	IOW	ELK	POC; 19	ISF	BLN	DSF	SLM	IRP	KAN		70th	270	
