= 2023 Southern Illinois 100 =

16th race of the 2023 ARCA Menards Series

Race details
- Race 16 of 20 of the 2023 ARCA Menards Series
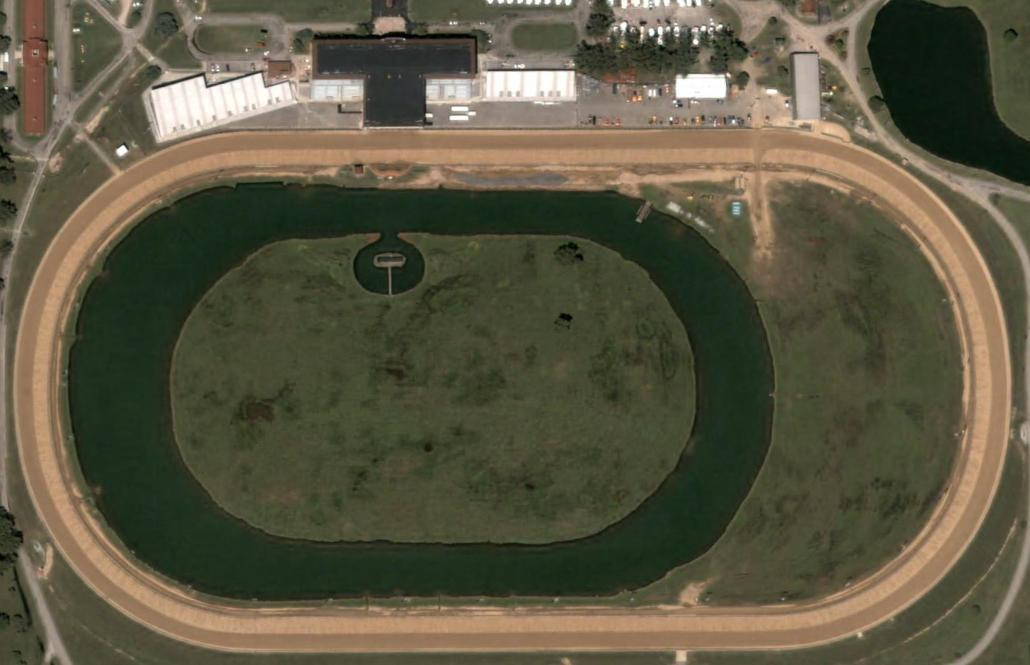
- Date: September 3, 2023
- Official name: 43rd Annual Southern Illinois 100
- Location: DuQuoin State Fairgrounds Racetrack, Du Quoin, Illinois
- Course: Permanent racing facility
- Course length: 1 miles (1.6 km)
- Distance: 100 laps, 100 mi (160 km)
- Scheduled distance: 100 laps, 100 mi (160 km)
- Average speed: 76.207 mph (122.643 km/h)

Pole position
Driver	William Sawalich	Joe Gibbs Racing
- Time: 34.595

Most laps led
Driver	Jesse Love	Venturini Motorsports
- Laps: 80

Winner
No. 20	Jesse Love	Venturini Motorsports

Television in the United States
- Network: FS2
- Announcers: Eric Brennan and Phil Parsons

Radio in the United States
- Radio: ARCA Racing Network

The 2023 Southern Illinois 100 was the 16th stock car race of the 2023 ARCA Menards Series season, and the 43rd iteration of the event. The race was held on Sunday, September 3, 2023, in Du Quoin, Illinois at the DuQuoin State Fairgrounds Racetrack, a 1-mile (1.6 km) permanent oval-shaped dirt track. The race took the scheduled 100 laps to complete. Jesse Love, driving for Venturini Motorsports, would put on a blistering performance, leading 80 of the 100 laps, and earning his 11th career ARCA Menards Series win, and his ninth of the season. Love would also extend his lead in the championship. To fill out the podium, Brent Crews, driving for Venturini Motorsports, and Will Kimmel, driving for family-owned Kimmel Racing, would finish 2nd and 3rd, respectively.

== Background ==
DuQuoin State Fairgrounds Racetrack is a one-mile (1.6-km) clay oval motor racetrack in Du Quoin, Illinois, about 90 miles (140 km) southeast of St Louis, Missouri. It is a stop on the ARCA Menards Series, USAC Silver Crown Series and American Flat Track.

The DuQuoin "Magic Mile" racetrack was constructed on reclaimed stripmine land in 1946 by W.R. Hayes. The track's first national championship race was held in September 1948. In the second race on October 10, popular AAA National driving champion Ted Horn was killed in the fourth turn when a spindle on his championship car broke. The national championship race for the USAC Silver Crown dirt cars is held in his honor.

=== Entry list ===
- (R) denotes rookie driver.

#	Driver	Team	Make	Sponsor
2	Andrés Pérez de Lara (R)	Rev Racing	Chevrolet	Max Siegel Inc.
03	Alex Clubb (Note: Chris Golden drove the 03 car in practice and qualifying. Alex Clubb drove the car in the race.)	Clubb Racing Inc.	Ford	Drill Brush Power Scrubber
06	A. J. Moyer (R)	Wayne Peterson Racing	Toyota	Bucked Up Energy
8	Sean Corr	Empire Racing	Ford	Miller Welders
10	Clayton Weatherman	Fast Track Racing	Toyota	Freedom Welding, JMCS
11	Dallas Frueh	Fast Track Racing	Ford	Universal Technical Institute
12	Tim Monroe	Fast Track Racing	Chevrolet	Rumbold Farms, HOI Vending
15	Sean Hingorani	Venturini Motorsports	Toyota	Fidelity Capital
16	Kelly Kovski	Kelly Kovski Racing	Chevrolet	BRANDT, Schluckibier Farms
18	William Sawalich	Joe Gibbs Racing	Toyota	Starkey, SoundGear
20	Jesse Love	Venturini Motorsports	Toyota	GearWrench
25	Brent Crews	Venturini Motorsports	Toyota	Yahoo!, Mobil 1
30	Frankie Muniz (R)	Rette Jones Racing	Ford	Ford Performance
31	Brayton Laster	Rise Motorsports	Chevrolet	Preferred Paint & Drywall
32	Christian Rose (R)	AM Racing	Ford	West Virginia Tourism
48	Brad Smith	Brad Smith Motorsports	Chevrolet	Oktoberfest Race Weekend
66	Jon Garrett (R)	Veer Motorsports	Chevrolet	Venture Foods
69	Will Kimmel	Kimmel Racing	Ford	Kimmel Racing
Official entry list

== Practice ==
The first and only practice session was held on Sunday, September 3, at 4:30 p.m. CST, and would last for 30 minutes. Will Kimmel, driving for family-owned Kimmel Racing, would set the fastest time in the session, with a lap of 34.747, and an average speed of 103.606 mph (166.738 km/h).

Pos.	#	Driver	Team	Make	Time	Speed
1	69	Will Kimmel	Kimmel Racing	Ford	34.747	103.606
2	20	Jesse Love	Venturini Motorsports	Toyota	34.942	103.028
3	25	Brent Crews	Venturini Motorsports	Toyota	34.953	102.995
Full practice results

== Qualifying ==
Qualifying was held on Sunday, September 3, at 6:00 p.m. CST. The qualifying system used is a single-car, one-lap system with only one round. Whoever sets the fastest time in that round wins the pole. William Sawalich, driving for Joe Gibbs Racing, would score the pole for the race, with a lap of 34.595, and an average speed of 104.061 mph (167.470 km/h).

Pos.	#	Driver	Team	Make	Time	Speed
1	18	William Sawalich	Joe Gibbs Racing	Toyota	34.595	104.061
2	69	Will Kimmel	Kimmel Racing	Ford	34.632	103.950
3	25	Brent Crews	Venturini Motorsports	Toyota	34.776	103.520
4	20	Jesse Love	Venturini Motorsports	Toyota	35.006	102.840
5	2	Andrés Pérez de Lara (R)	Rev Racing	Chevrolet	35.056	102.693
6	15	Sean Hingorani	Venturini Motorsports	Toyota	35.249	102.131
7	32	Christian Rose (R)	AM Racing	Ford	35.804	100.547
8	16	Kelly Kovski	Kelly Kovski Racing	Chevrolet	35.838	100.452
9	11	Dallas Frueh	Fast Track Racing	Ford	35.899	100.281
10	30	Frankie Muniz (R)	Rette Jones Racing	Ford	35.985	100.042
11	10	Clayton Weatherman	Fast Track Racing	Toyota	36.407	98.882
12	66	Jon Garrett (R)	Veer Motorsports	Chevrolet	36.803	97.818
13	31	Brayton Laster	Rise Motorsports	Chevrolet	38.529	93.436
14	48	Brad Smith	Brad Smith Motorsports	Chevrolet	40.258	89.423
15	8	Sean Corr	Empire Racing	Ford	42.100	85.511
16	12	Tim Monroe	Fast Track Racing	Chevrolet	42.755	84.201
17	03	Chris Golden	Clubb Racing Inc.	Ford	43.234	83.268
Withdrew
18	06	A. J. Moyer (R)	Wayne Peterson Racing	Toyota	–	–
Official qualifying results

== Race results ==
Fin	St	#	Driver	Team	Make	Laps	Led	Status	Pts
1	4	20	Jesse Love	Venturini Motorsports	Toyota	100	80	Running	48
2	3	25	Brent Crews	Venturini Motorsports	Toyota	100	0	Running	42
3	2	69	Will Kimmel	Kimmel Racing	Ford	100	0	Running	41
4	5	2	Andrés Pérez de Lara (R)	Rev Racing	Chevrolet	100	0	Running	40
5	1	18	William Sawalich	Joe Gibbs Racing	Toyota	100	20	Running	40
6	8	16	Kelly Kovski	Kelly Kovski Racing	Chevrolet	100	0	Running	38
7	7	32	Christian Rose (R)	AM Racing	Ford	100	0	Running	37
8	16	12	Tim Monroe	Fast Track Racing	Chevrolet	99	0	Running	36
9	17	03	Alex Clubb	Clubb Racing Inc.	Ford	96	0	Running	35
10	13	31	Brayton Laster	Rise Motorsports	Chevrolet	92	0	Running	34
11	14	48	Brad Smith	Brad Smith Motorsports	Chevrolet	92	0	Running	33
12	10	30	Frankie Muniz (R)	Rette Jones Racing	Ford	59	0	Accident	32
13	15	8	Sean Corr	Empire Racing	Ford	57	0	Accident	31
14	6	15	Sean Hingorani	Venturini Motorsports	Toyota	55	0	Accident	30
15	12	66	Jon Garrett (R)	Veer Motorsports	Chevrolet	39	0	Mechanical	29
16	11	10	Clayton Weatherman	Fast Track Racing	Toyota	29	0	Electrical	28
17	9	11	Dallas Frueh	Fast Track Racing	Ford	12	0	Overheating	27
Withdrew
		06	A. J. Moyer (R)	Wayne Peterson Racing	Toyota				
Official race results

== Standings after the race ==
Drivers' Championship standings

Pos	Driver	Points
1	Jesse Love	842
2	Andrés Pérez de Lara	712 (-130)
3	Frankie Muniz	693 (-149)
4	Christian Rose	684 (-158)
5	Jon Garrett	612 (-230)
6	A. J. Moyer	553 (-289)
7	Brad Smith	536 (-306)
8	William Sawalich	425 (-417)
9	Toni Breidinger	376 (-466)
10	Jack Wood	285 (-557)

- Note: Only the first 10 positions are included for the driver standings.

Previous race: 2023 Sprecher 150	ARCA Menards Series; 2023 season	Next race: 2023 Sioux Chief Fast Track 150
