= Nick Higdon =

American racing driver

- Born: April 29, 1980 (age 46); Big Clifty, Kentucky, U.S.

ARCA Menards Series career
- 16 races run over 3 years
- Best finish: 25th (2017)
- First race: 2015 Southern Illinois 100 (DuQuoin)
- Last race: 2017 Crosley Brands 150 (Kentucky)
Wins	Top tens	Poles
0	0	0
- Statistics up to date as of February 4, 2025.

Nick Higdon (born April 29, 1980) is an American former professional stock car racing driver who has previously competed in the ARCA Racing Series from 2015 to 2017.

== Motorsports results ==
=== ARCA Racing Series ===
(key) (Bold – Pole position awarded by qualifying time. Italics – Pole position earned by points standings or practice time. * – Most laps led.)

ARCA Racing Series results
Year	Team	No.	Make	1	2	3	4	5	6	7	8	9	10	11	12	13	14	15	16	17	18	19	20	ARSC	Pts	Ref
2015	Crosley Sports Group	56	Chevy	DAY	MOB	NSH	SLM	TAL	TOL	NJE	POC	MCH	CHI	WIN	IOW	IRP	POC	BLN	ISF	DSF; 33	SLM	KEN		126th	100	
2015	Kimmel Racing	68	Ford																				KAN; 31	126th	100	
2016	Higdon Racing	08	Chevy	DAY	NSH	SLM	TAL	TOL	NJE	POC	MCH; 15										CHI; 14	KEN; 11	KAN; 29	33rd	850	
2016	Kimmel Racing	69	Ford									MAD; 21	WIN; 21	IOW	IRP	POC	BLN	ISF	DSF	SLM				33rd	850	
2017	Kimmel Racing	69	Toyota	DAY	NSH; 19	SLM	TAL	TOL; 26	ELK	POC; 22	MCH; 11	MAD	IOW; 20	IRP	POC; 12	WIN	ISF	ROA	DSF	SLM	CHI; 21	KEN; 22	KAN; Wth	25th	1100	
