= 2020 Calypso Lemonade 200 =

Race details
- Race 5 of 20 of the 2020 ARCA Menards Series; Race 2 of 10 of the 2020 Sioux Chief Showdown
- Date: July 3, 2020
- Official name: 16th Annual Calypso Lemonade 200
- Location: Brownsburg, Indiana, Lucas Oil Raceway
- Course: Permanent racing facility
- Course length: 0.686 miles (1.104 km)
- Distance: 200 laps, 137.2 mi (220.802 km)
- Scheduled distance: 200 laps, 137.2 mi (220.802 km)
- Average speed: 82.717 miles per hour (133.120 km/h)

Pole position
Driver	Chandler Smith	Venturini Motorsports
- Time: 22.149

Most laps led
Driver	Chandler Smith	Venturini Motorsports
- Laps: 162

Winner
No. 20	Chandler Smith	Venturini Motorsports

Television in the United States
- Network: MAVTV
- Announcers: Bob Dillner, Jim Tretow

Radio in the United States
- Radio: ARCA Racing Network

The 2020 Calypso Lemonade 200 was the fifth stock car race of the 2020 ARCA Menards Series, the second race of the 2020 Sioux Chief Showdown, and the 16th iteration of the event. The race was held on Friday, July 3, 2020, in Brownsburg, Indiana at Lucas Oil Raceway, a 0.686-mile (1.104 km) permanent oval-shaped racetrack. The race took the scheduled 200 laps to complete. At race's end, Chandler Smith of Venturini Motorsports would dominate and win his ninth and to date, final career ARCA Menards Series win and his second of the season. To fill out the podium, Sam Mayer of GMS Racing and Hailie Deegan of DGR-Crosley would finish second and third, respectively.

== Background ==
Lucas Oil Raceway (formerly Indianapolis Raceway Park and O'Reilly Raceway Park at Indianapolis) is an auto racing facility in Brownsburg, Indiana, United States, about 10 miles (16 km) west of Downtown Indianapolis. It includes a 0.686-mile (1.104 km) oval track, a 2.5-mile (4.0 km) road course (which has fallen into disrepair and is no longer used), and a 4,400-foot (1,300 m) drag strip which is among the premier drag racing venues in the world. The complex receives about 500,000 visitors annually.

=== Entry list ===
#	Driver	Team	Make	Sponsor
1	Max McLaughlin	Hattori Racing Enterprises	Toyota	Mohawk Northeast, Inc.
4	Hailie Deegan	DGR-Crosley	Ford	Craftsman
06	Tim Richmond	Wayne Peterson Racing	Toyota	Wayne Peterson Racing
10	Ryan Huff	Fast Track Racing	Toyota	Land & Coates Outdoor Power Equipment
11	Mike Basham	Fast Track Racing	Toyota	Fast Track Racing
12	Dick Doheny	Fast Track Racing	Chevrolet	Fast Track Racing
15	Drew Dollar	Venturini Motorsports	Toyota	Dollar Concrete Construction Company, Lynx Capital
17	Taylor Gray	DGR-Crosley	Ford	Ford Performance
18	Ty Gibbs	Joe Gibbs Racing	Toyota	Monster Energy
20	Chandler Smith	Venturini Motorsports	Toyota	JBL
21	Sam Mayer	GMS Racing	Chevrolet	Brogdon Family Foundation
22	Derek Griffith	Chad Bryant Racing	Ford	Original Gourmet Lollipops
23	Bret Holmes	Bret Holmes Racing	Chevrolet	Holmes II Excavating
25	Michael Self	Venturini Motorsports	Toyota	Sinclair
32	Howie DiSavino III	Win-Tron Racing	Chevrolet	Bud's Plumbing, Kees Travel
42	Kyle Sieg	Cook-Finley Racing	Chevrolet	Cook-Finley Racing
46	Thad Moffitt	DGR-Crosley	Ford	Performance Plus Motor Oil Richard Petty Signature Series
48	Brad Smith	Brad Smith Motorsports	Chevrolet	Home Building Solutions, NASCAR Low Teams
69	Brian Finney	Finney Racing Enterprises	Chevrolet	Bob Steele Chevrolet
91	Justin Carroll	TC Motorsports	Toyota	Carroll's Automotive
Official entry list

== Practice ==
The only 45-minute practice session was held on Friday, June 3. Michael Self of Venturini Motorsports would set the fastest time in the session, with a 22.390 and an average speed of 110.299 miles per hour (177.509 km/h).

Pos.	#	Driver	Team	Make	Time	Speed
1	25	Michael Self	Venturini Motorsports	Toyota	22.390	110.299
2	17	Taylor Gray	DGR-Crosley	Ford	22.509	109.716
3	18	Ty Gibbs	Joe Gibbs Racing	Toyota	22.583	109.357
Full practice results

== Qualifying ==
Qualifying was held on Friday, June 3, at 5:45 PM EST. Each driver would have two laps to set a fastest time; the fastest of the two would count as their official qualifying lap. Chandler Smith of Venturini Motorsports would win the pole, with a lap of 22.149 and an average speed of 111.499 miles per hour (179.440 km/h).

=== Full qualifying results ===
Pos.	#	Driver	Team	Make	Time	Speed
1	20	Chandler Smith	Venturini Motorsports	Toyota	22.149	111.499
2	18	Ty Gibbs	Joe Gibbs Racing	Toyota	22.204	111.223
3	25	Michael Self	Venturini Motorsports	Toyota	22.246	111.013
4	4	Hailie Deegan	DGR-Crosley	Ford	22.298	110.754
5	22	Derek Griffith	Chad Bryant Racing	Ford	22.299	110.749
6	17	Taylor Gray	DGR-Crosley	Ford	22.343	110.531
7	23	Bret Holmes	Bret Holmes Racing	Chevrolet	22.457	109.970
8	21	Sam Mayer	GMS Racing	Chevrolet	22.467	109.921
9	15	Drew Dollar	Venturini Motorsports	Toyota	22.555	109.492
10	46	Thad Moffitt	DGR-Crosley	Ford	22.660	108.985
11	32	Howie DiSavino III	Win-Tron Racing	Chevrolet	22.773	108.444
12	1	Max McLaughlin	Hattori Racing Enterprises	Toyota	22.829	108.178
13	69	Brian Finney	Finney Racing Enterprises	Chevrolet	23.106	106.881
14	42	Kyle Sieg	Cook-Finley Racing	Chevrolet	23.175	106.563
15	91	Justin Carroll	TC Motorsports	Toyota	23.210	106.402
16	11	Mike Basham	Fast Track Racing	Toyota	24.599	100.394
17	48	Brad Smith	Brad Smith Motorsports	Chevrolet	25.532	96.726
18	12	Dick Doheny	Fast Track Racing	Chevrolet	26.361	93.684
19	06	Tim Richmond	Wayne Peterson Racing	Toyota	—	—
20	10	Ryan Huff	Fast Track Racing	Toyota	—	—
Official qualifying results

== Race results ==
Fin	St	#	Driver	Team	Make	Laps	Led	Status	Pts
1	1	20	Chandler Smith	Venturini Motorsports	Toyota	200	162	running	48
2	8	21	Sam Mayer	GMS Racing	Chevrolet	200	0	running	42
3	4	4	Hailie Deegan	DGR-Crosley	Ford	200	0	running	41
4	6	17	Taylor Gray	DGR-Crosley	Ford	200	0	running	40
5	10	46	Thad Moffitt	DGR-Crosley	Ford	200	0	running	39
6	12	1	Max McLaughlin	Hattori Racing Enterprises	Toyota	200	0	running	38
7	7	23	Bret Holmes	Bret Holmes Racing	Chevrolet	199	0	running	37
8	3	25	Michael Self	Venturini Motorsports	Toyota	198	0	running	36
9	11	32	Howie DiSavino III	Win-Tron Racing	Chevrolet	197	0	running	35
10	14	42	Kyle Sieg	Cook-Finley Racing	Chevrolet	196	0	running	34
11	13	69	Brian Finney	Finney Racing Enterprises	Chevrolet	190	0	running	33
12	5	22	Derek Griffith	Chad Bryant Racing	Ford	188	0	running	32
13	15	91	Justin Carroll	TC Motorsports	Toyota	186	0	running	31
14	9	15	Drew Dollar	Venturini Motorsports	Toyota	185	0	running	30
15	2	18	Ty Gibbs	Joe Gibbs Racing	Toyota	90	38	engine	30
16	20	10	Ryan Huff	Fast Track Racing	Toyota	74	0	drive shaft	28
17	17	48	Brad Smith	Brad Smith Motorsports	Chevrolet	31	0	brakes	27
18	18	12	Dick Doheny	Fast Track Racing	Chevrolet	25	0	brakes	26
19	16	11	Mike Basham	Fast Track Racing	Toyota	20	0	overheating	25
20	19	06	Tim Richmond	Wayne Peterson Racing	Toyota	0	0	electrical	24
Official race results

Previous race: 2020 General Tire #AnywhereIsPossible 200	ARCA Menards Series; 2020 season	Next race: 2020 General Tire 150 (Kentucky)
