= 2023 Sioux Chief Fast Track 150 =

17th race of the 2023 ARCA Menards Series

Race details
- Race 17 of 20 of the 2023 ARCA Menards Series
- Date: September 8, 2023
- Official name: 23rd Annual Sioux Chief Fast Track 150
- Location: Kansas Speedway, Kansas City, Kansas
- Course: Permanent racing facility
- Course length: 1.5 miles (2.4 km)
- Distance: 100 laps, 150 mi (241 km)
- Scheduled distance: 100 laps, 150 mi (241 km)
- Average speed: 130.120 mph (209.408 km/h)

Pole position
Driver	Jesse Love	Venturini Motorsports
- Time: 30.694

Most laps led
Driver	Connor Mosack	Joe Gibbs Racing
- Laps: 64

Winner
No. 18	Connor Mosack	Joe Gibbs Racing

Television in the United States
- Network: FS1
- Announcers: Jamie Little, Phil Parsons, and Trevor Bayne

Radio in the United States
- Radio: MRN

The 2023 Sioux Chief Fast Track 150 was the 17th stock car race of the 2023 ARCA Menards Series season, and the 23rd iteration of the event. The race was held on Friday, September 8, 2023, in Kansas City, Kansas at Kansas Speedway, a 1.5 miles (2.4 km) permanent quad-oval shaped racetrack. The race took the scheduled 100 laps to complete. In a wild race that saw only two drivers finish on the lead lap, Connor Mosack, driving for Joe Gibbs Racing, would dominate the final portion of the race, and earned his first career ARCA Menards Series win. Mosack would lead a race-high 64 laps in dominating fashion. To fill out the podium, Carson Kvapil, driving for Pinnacle Racing Group, and Toni Breidinger, driving for Venturini Motorsports, would finish 2nd and 3rd, respectively.

== Background ==
Kansas Speedway is a 1.5-mile (2.4 km) tri-oval race track in Kansas City, Kansas. It was built in 2001 and it currently hosts two annual NASCAR race weekends. The IndyCar Series also raced at here until 2011. The speedway is owned and operated by the International Speedway Corporation.

=== Entry list ===
- (R) denotes rookie driver.

#	Driver	Team	Make	Sponsor
2	Andrés Pérez de Lara (R)	Rev Racing	Chevrolet	Max Siegel Inc.
03	Alex Clubb	Clubb Racing Inc.	Ford	Clubb Racing Inc.
06	Kevin Hinckle	Wayne Peterson Racing	Chevrolet	KH Automotive
6	Lavar Scott	Rev Racing	Chevrolet	Max Siegel Inc.
10	Tim Monroe	Fast Track Racing	Ford	Fast Track Racing
11	Matt Kemp	Fast Track Racing	Toyota	Fast Track Racing
12	Ryan Huff	Fast Track Racing	Ford	Southeastern Services, Land & Coates
15	Jake Finch	Venturini Motorsports	Toyota	Phoenix Construction
18	Connor Mosack	Joe Gibbs Racing	Toyota	Mobil 1
20	Jesse Love	Venturini Motorsports	Toyota	JBL
25	Dean Thompson	Venturini Motorsports	Toyota	MCM Transportation
28	Carson Kvapil	Pinnacle Racing Group	Chevrolet	Chevrolet Performance
30	Frankie Muniz (R)	Rette Jones Racing	Ford	Ford Performance
32	Christian Rose (R)	AM Racing	Ford	West Virginia Tourism
48	Brad Smith	Brad Smith Motorsports	Chevrolet	Oktoberfest Race Weekend
55	Toni Breidinger	Venturini Motorsports	Toyota	Raising Cane's Chicken Fingers
66	Jon Garrett (R)	Veer Motorsports	Chevrolet	Fort Worth Screen Printing
69	Scott Melton	Kimmel Racing	Toyota	Melton-McFadden Insurance Agency
72	Cody Coughlin	Coughlin Brothers Racing	Ford	JEGS, Cody Coughlin Company
73	Andy Jankowiak	KLAS Motorsports	Toyota	Dak's Market
74	Mandy Chick	Team Chick Motorsports	Chevrolet	Dynamic Drivelines, JRCTax.com
Official entry list

== Practice ==
The first and only practice session was held on Friday, September 8, at 12:40 PM CST, and would last for 45 minutes. Connor Mosack, driving for Joe Gibbs Racing, would set the fastest time in the session, with a lap of 31.176, and an average speed of 173.210 mph (278.754 km/h).

Pos.	#	Driver	Team	Make	Time	Speed
1	18	Connor Mosack	Joe Gibbs Racing	Toyota	31.176	173.210
2	20	Jesse Love	Venturini Motorsports	Toyota	31.180	173.188
3	25	Dean Thompson	Venturini Motorsports	Toyota	31.209	173.027
Full practice results

== Qualifying ==
Qualifying was held on Friday, September 8, at 1:40 PM CST. The qualifying system used is a single-car, two-lap system with only one round. Whoever sets the fastest time in that round wins the pole. Jesse Love, driving for Venturini Motorsports, would score the pole for the race, with a lap of 30.694, and an average speed of 175.930 mph (283.132 km/h).

Pos.	#	Driver	Team	Make	Time	Speed
1	20	Jesse Love	Venturini Motorsports	Toyota	30.694	175.930
2	25	Dean Thompson	Venturini Motorsports	Toyota	30.982	174.295
3	28	Carson Kvapil	Pinnacle Racing Group	Chevrolet	30.983	174.289
4	18	Connor Mosack	Joe Gibbs Racing	Toyota	31.031	174.020
5	2	Andrés Pérez de Lara (R)	Rev Racing	Chevrolet	31.116	173.544
6	6	Lavar Scott	Rev Racing	Chevrolet	31.171	173.238
7	30	Frankie Muniz (R)	Rette Jones Racing	Ford	31.377	172.101
8	15	Jake Finch	Venturini Motorsports	Toyota	31.403	171.958
9	32	Christian Rose (R)	AM Racing	Ford	31.592	170.929
10	72	Cody Coughlin	Coughlin Brothers Racing	Ford	31.659	170.568
11	73	Andy Jankowiak	KLAS Motorsports	Toyota	31.669	170.514
12	55	Toni Breidinger	Venturini Motorsports	Toyota	31.725	170.213
13	74	Mandy Chick	Team Chick Motorsports	Chevrolet	32.367	166.837
14	12	Ryan Huff	Fast Track Racing	Ford	32.914	164.064
15	69	Scott Melton	Kimmel Racing	Toyota	33.006	163.607
16	66	Jon Garrett (R)	Veer Motorsports	Chevrolet	33.128	163.004
17	11	Matt Kemp	Fast Track Racing	Toyota	34.816	155.101
18	10	Tim Monroe	Fast Track Racing	Ford	36.569	147.666
19	03	Alex Clubb	Clubb Racing Inc.	Ford	37.655	143.407
20	48	Brad Smith	Brad Smith Motorsports	Chevrolet	39.288	137.447
21	06	Kevin Hinckle	Wayne Peterson Racing	Chevrolet	–	–
Official qualifying results

== Race results ==
Fin	St	#	Driver	Team	Make	Laps	Led	Status	Pts
1	4	18	Connor Mosack	Joe Gibbs Racing	Toyota	100	64	Running	48
2	3	28	Carson Kvapil	Pinnacle Racing Group	Chevrolet	100	0	Running	42
3	12	55	Toni Breidinger	Venturini Motorsports	Toyota	99	0	Running	41
4	6	6	Lavar Scott	Rev Racing	Chevrolet	99	0	Running	40
5	8	15	Jake Finch	Venturini Motorsports	Toyota	99	0	Running	39
6	9	32	Christian Rose (R)	AM Racing	Ford	99	0	Running	38
7	15	69	Scott Melton	Kimmel Racing	Toyota	98	0	Running	37
8	2	25	Dean Thompson	Venturini Motorsports	Toyota	98	35	Running	37
9	13	74	Mandy Chick	Team Chick Motorsports	Chevrolet	98	0	Running	35
10	11	73	Andy Jankowiak	KLAS Motorsports	Toyota	97	0	Running	34
11	10	72	Cody Coughlin	Coughlin Brothers Racing	Ford	95	0	Fuel Pressure	33
12	16	66	Jon Garrett (R)	Veer Motorsports	Chevrolet	95	0	Running	32
13	19	03	Alex Clubb	Clubb Racing Inc.	Ford	86	0	Running	31
14	20	48	Brad Smith	Brad Smith Motorsports	Chevrolet	86	0	Running	30
15	14	12	Ryan Huff	Fast Track Racing	Ford	86	0	Running	29
16	21	06	Kevin Hinckle	Wayne Peterson Racing	Chevrolet	57	0	Mechanical	28
17	5	2	Andrés Pérez de Lara (R)	Rev Racing	Chevrolet	57	0	Accident	27
18	7	30	Frankie Muniz (R)	Rette Jones Racing	Ford	48	0	Accident	26
19	1	20	Jesse Love	Venturini Motorsports	Toyota	24	1	Accident	27
20	17	11	Matt Kemp	Fast Track Racing	Toyota	10	0	Vibration	24
21	18	10	Tim Monroe	Fast Track Racing	Ford	4	0	Mechanical	23
Official race results

== Standings after the race ==
Drivers' Championship standings

	Pos	Driver	Points
	1	Jesse Love	869
	2	Andrés Pérez de Lara	739 (-130)
1	3	Christian Rose	723 (-146)
1	4	Frankie Muniz	719 (-150)
	5	Jon Garrett	612 (-230)
1	6	Brad Smith	566 (-303)
1	7	A. J. Moyer	553 (-316)
	8	William Sawalich	425 (-444)
	9	Toni Breidinger	417 (-452)
1	10	Tim Monroe	307 (-562)

- Note: Only the first 10 positions are included for the driver standings.

Previous race: 2023 Southern Illinois 100	ARCA Menards Series; 2023 season	Next race: 2023 Bush's Beans 200
