= Brian Finney (racing driver) =

American racing driver

- Born: September 27, 1977 (age 49); Merritt Island, Florida, U.S.

ARCA Menards Series career
- 23 races run over 9 years
- Best finish: 35th (2014)
- First race: 2012 Messina Wildlife Animal Stopper 200 (IRP)
- Last race: 2025 LiUNA! 150 (IRP)
Wins	Top tens	Poles
0	4	0

ARCA Menards Series East career
- 2 races run over 2 years
- Best finish: 41st (2020)
- First race: 2020 New Smyrna 175 (New Smyrna)
- Last race: 2025 LiUNA! 150 (IRP)
Wins	Top tens	Poles
0	0	0
- Statistics up to date as of July 27, 2025.

Brian Finney (born September 27, 1977) is an American professional stock car racing driver and crew chief who last competed part-time in the ARCA Menards Series East, driving the No. 69/80 Chevrolet for Finney Racing Enterprises. He also serves as a crew chief for Scofield Motorsports.

== Racing career ==
Prior to his career in ARCA, Finney previously competed in series like the FASCAR Sunbelt Super Late Model Series, the Florida Pro Series, and the Bright House Challenge Series.

In 2012, Finney made his ARCA Racing Series debut at Lucas Oil Raceway, driving his self owned No. 3 Chevrolet, where he started 22nd and finished one lap down in twelfth. He then made one more start at Salem Speedway, where he finished in 29th due to handling issues. In the following year, Finney ran four races, this time in the No. 80, getting a best finish of tenth at Mobile International Speedway. In 2014, he ran in five races, getting a best finish of thirteenth at Salem, and in 2015, he ran four races, getting two top-tens with a best finish of seventh at Toledo Speedway.

In 2016, Finney ran three races in collaboration with Kimmel Racing in the No. 69. In his first start of the year at Nashville Fairgrounds Speedway, Finney finished a career best third despite starting 22nd. He then finished in the top-twenty in his next two starts at Toledo and Indianapolis. In 2017, Finney ran at Nashville, this time in the No. 80, where he finished in eleventh. He was originally entered at Toledo, this time in a Ford, but suffered a fire during practice, and was forced to extinguish the flames on his own car due to safety workers not putting out the fire, which caused controversy, as well as his team not being allowed to go on the track to extinguish the flames. Because of this, the series made several adjustments to the safety protocols ahead of the race. Finney and his team, along with their second entry for the weekend in the No. 04 of Scott Reeves, would withdraw from the event and would not attempt another race for the remainder of the year.

After a year long hiatus from the series, Finney returned at Salem in the No. 80 Chevrolet, where he finished in seventeenth due to suffering a vibration a quarter of the way through the event. In 2020, he made his ARCA Menards Series East debut at New Smyrna Speedway, where he started nineteenth and finished fourteenth. He also ran at Indianapolis in the main ARCA series, driving the No. 69 Chevrolet where he finished ten laps down in eleventh.

== Motorsports career results ==
=== ARCA Menards Series ===
(key) (Bold – Pole position awarded by qualifying time. Italics – Pole position earned by points standings or practice time. * – Most laps led.)

ARCA Menards Series results
Year	Team	No.	Make	1	2	3	4	5	6	7	8	9	10	11	12	13	14	15	16	17	18	19	20	21	AMSC	Pts	Ref
2012	Finney Racing Enterprises	3	Chevy	DAY	MOB	SLM	TAL	TOL	ELK	POC	MCH	WIN	NJE	IOW	CHI	IRP; 12	POC	BLN	ISF	MAD	SLM; 29	DSF	KAN		76th	255	
2013	Finney Racing Enterprises	80	Chevy	DAY	MOB; 10	SLM; 18	TAL	TOL; 11	ELK	POC	MCH	ROA	WIN	CHI; Wth	NJM	POC	BLN	ISF	MAD; 19	DSF	IOW	SLM	KEN	KAN	43rd	630	
2014	Finney Racing Enterprises	80	Chevy	DAY	MOB; 14										IRP; 23	POC	BLN	ISF; 21	MAD	DSF	SLM; 21	KEN	KAN		35th	690	
2014	Finney Racing Enterprises	46	Chevy			SLM; 13	TAL	TOL	NJE	POC	MCH	ELK	WIN	CHI											35th	690	
2015	Finney Racing Enterprises	68	Chevy	DAY	MOB; 10	NSH; 13	SLM	TAL	TOL; 7	NJE	POC	MCH	CHI	WIN	IOW	IRP; 28	POC	BLN	ISF	DSF	SLM	KEN	KAN		38th	630	
2016	Finney Racing Enterprises	69	Chevy	DAY	NSH; 3	SLM	TAL	TOL; 17	NJE	POC	MCH	MAD	WIN	IOW											45th	520	
2016	Finney Racing Enterprises	69	Ford												IRP; 14	POC	BLN	ISF	DSF	SLM	CHI	KEN	KAN		45th	520	
2017	Finney Racing Enterprises	80	Chevy	DAY	NSH; 11	SLM	TAL																		81st	200	
2017	Finney Racing Enterprises	80	Ford					TOL; Wth	ELK	POC	MCH	MAD	IOW	IRP	POC	WIN	ISF	ROA	DSF	SLM	CHI	KEN	KAN		81st	200	
2019	Finney Racing Enterprises	69	Chevy	DAY	FIF	SLM	TAL	NSH; Wth	TOL	CLT	POC	MCH	MAD	GTW	CHI	ELK	IOW	POC	ISF	DSF					70th	145	
2019	Finney Racing Enterprises	80	Chevy																		SLM; 17	IRP	KAN		70th	145	
2020	Finney Racing Enterprises	69	Chevy	DAY	PHO	TAL	POC	IRP; 11	KEN	IOW	KAN	TOL	TOL	MCH	DAY	GTW	L44	TOL	BRI	WIN	MEM	ISF	KAN		63rd	33	
2025	Finney Racing Enterprises	69	Chevy	DAY	PHO	TAL	KAN	CLT	MCH	BLN	ELK	LRP	DOV	IRP; 27	IOW	GLN	ISF	MAD	DSF	BRI	SLM	KAN	TOL		135th	17	

==== ARCA Menards Series East ====
ARCA Menards Series East results
Year	Team	No.	Make	1	2	3	4	5	6	7	8	AMSEC	Pts	Ref
2020	Finney Racing Enterprises	80	Chevy	NSM; 14	TOL	DOV	TOL	BRI	FIF			41st	30	
2025	Finney Racing Enterprises	80	Chevy	FIF	CAR	NSV; Wth	FRS	DOV				71st	17	
2025	Finney Racing Enterprises	69	Chevy						IRP; 27	IOW	BRI	71st	17	
