= Clifty, West Virginia =

Unincorporated community in West Virginia, US

Coordinates: 38°08′44″N 80°57′43″W

Clifty is an unincorporated community in Fayette County, in the U.S. state of West Virginia.

The community was named for cliffs near the original town site.
