= Tom Hessert III =

American racing driver

Tom Hessert
- Born: Thomas Hessert III; May 22, 1986 (age 40); Cherry Hill, New Jersey, U.S.

NASCAR FedEx Freight Truck Series career
- 2 races run over 1 year
- Best finish: 84th (2010)
- First race: 2010 Lucas Oil 150 (Phoenix)
- Last race: 2010 Ford 200 (Homestead)
| Wins | Top tens | Poles |
|---|---|---|
| 0 | 0 | 0 |

ARCA Menards Series career
- 188 races run over 13 years
- ARCA no., team: No. 15 (Venturini Motorsports)
- Best finish: 2nd (2016)
- First race: 2007 Allen Crowe 100 (Springfield)
- Last race: 2022 Menards 250 (Elko)
- First win: 2010 Prairie Meadows 200 (Iowa)
- Last win: 2016 General Tire Grabber 100 (DuQuoin)
| Wins | Top tens | Poles |
|---|---|---|
| 6 | 113 | 5 |

ARCA Menards Series East career
- 3 races run over 2 years
- Best finish: 45th (2011)
- First race: 2009 NASCAR Home Tracks 150 (Greenville-Pickens)
- Last race: 2011 New Hampshire 125 (Loudon)
| Wins | Top tens | Poles |
|---|---|---|
| 0 | 0 | 0 |

Thomas Hessert III (born May 22, 1986) is an American professional stock car racing driver. He most recently competed part-time in the ARCA Menards Series, driving the No. 55 Toyota Camry for Venturini Motorsports and the No. 22 Ford Fusion for Chad Bryant Racing. He has raced in the series for over a decade and also made two NASCAR Gander RV & Outdoors Truck Series starts in 2010 for Germain Racing. In his eight full-time seasons in ARCA, he has finished in the top-10 in points every year, including in the top-5 in five of those eight years. He finished second in the ARCA point standings in 2016, his most recent full-time season in ARCA.

== Racing career ==
=== Early career ===
Hessert became the youngest driver to compete in the Rolex 24 when he drove in the event in 2003 at the age of sixteen alongside his father Tom Jr. Both of them shared the No. 68 for The Racer's Group.

=== ARCA career ===
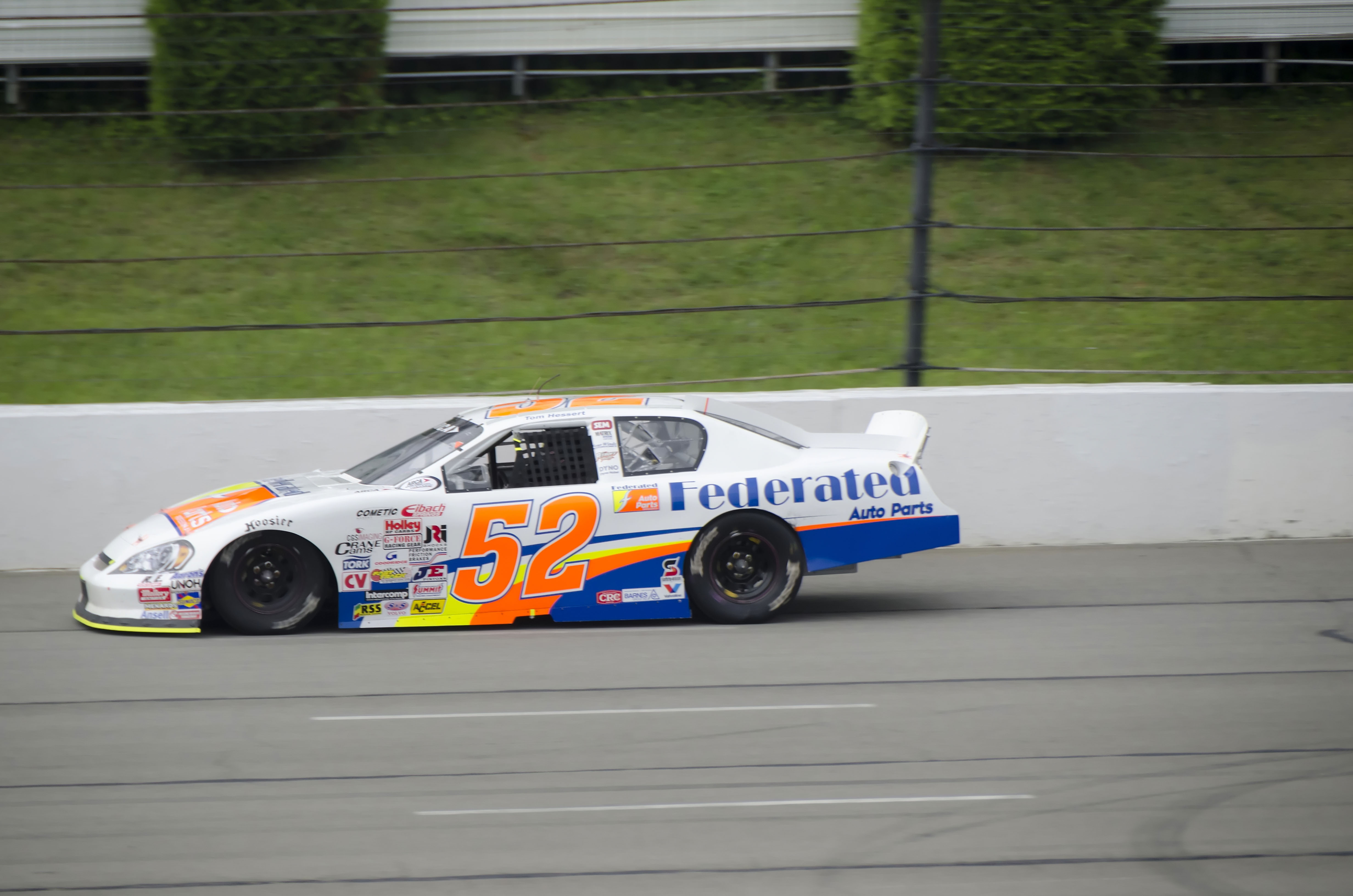
Hessert's No. 52 Ken Schrader Racing ARCA car at the second Pocono race in 2011.

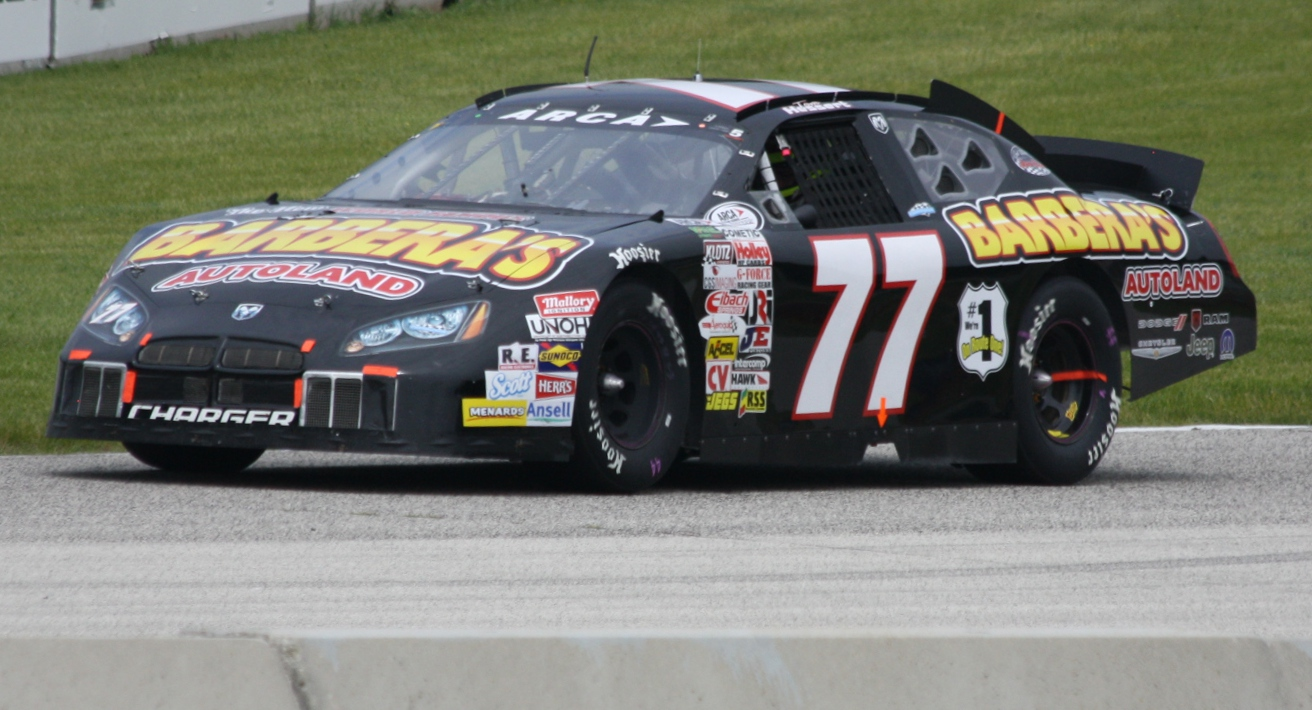
Hessert's No. 77 Cunningham Motorsports ARCA car at Road America in 2013.

Despite coming off the heels of a second-place points finish, Hessert decided to only run part-time in 2017 to spend more time with his family but left the door open to returning full-time in the future. He ended up running five races that season, sharing the Venturini No. 25 with Spencer Davis, Raphaël Lessard, Natalie Decker, Tanner Thorson and Christopher Bell.

He returned to Venturini for the season-opener at Daytona in 2018, this time in the No. 55 as Decker was driving the No. 25 full-time that year. Hessert's next start and only other of 2018 did not come until the race at IRP, where he drove the No. 22 for Chad Bryant Racing at that race as a replacement for Chase Briscoe, who could not compete after the race was rescheduled a month later than it was supposed to be run due to rain, and the new race date conflicted with his Xfinity schedule. CBR is the successor team to Cunningham Motorsports, who Hessert drove the No. 77 for full-time previously.

After having not competed in any races in the series in 2019, Hessert returned to ARCA in their January 2020 preseason test session at Daytona, where he drove the No. 2 car for Chad Bryant Racing.

== Personal life ==
Hessert is the son of former sports car racing driver Tom Hessert Jr., who won the 1988 IMSA GT Championship, and three times in both the 24 Hours of Daytona and the 12 Hours of Sebring. His family is involved in the auto industry, owning several car dealerships in the Philadelphia metropolitan area, including Cherry Hill Classic Cars, which has sponsored Hessert during various points of his career, particularly during his time driving the Cunningham No. 77 in ARCA.

He was raised in Cherry Hill, New Jersey and attended Cherry Hill High School East. Hessert currently lives in Cherry Hill with his wife and young children, his eldest being named Tom Hessert IV.

== Motorsports career results ==
=== NASCAR ===
(key) (Bold – Pole position awarded by qualifying time. Italics – Pole position earned by points standings or practice time. * – Most laps led.)

==== Camping World Truck Series ====
NASCAR Camping World Truck Series results
| Year | Team | No. | Make | 1 | 2 | 3 | 4 | 5 | 6 | 7 | 8 | 9 | 10 | 11 | 12 | 13 | 14 | 15 | 16 | 17 | 18 | 19 | 20 | 21 | 22 | 23 | 24 | 25 | NCWTC | Pts | Ref |
|---|---|---|---|---|---|---|---|---|---|---|---|---|---|---|---|---|---|---|---|---|---|---|---|---|---|---|---|---|---|---|---|
| 2010 | Germain Racing | 9 | Toyota | DAY | ATL | MAR | NSH | KAN | DOV | CLT | TEX | MCH | IOW | GTY | IRP | POC | NSH | DAR | BRI | CHI | KEN | NHA | LVS | MAR | TAL | TEX | PHO; 31 | | 84th | 146 | |
| 2010 | Germain Racing | 77 | Toyota | | | | | | | | | | | | | | | | | | | | | | | | | HOM; 29 | 84th | 146 | |

==== K&N Pro Series East ====
NASCAR K&N Pro Series East results
| Year | Team | No. | Make | 1 | 2 | 3 | 4 | 5 | 6 | 7 | 8 | 9 | 10 | 11 | 12 | NKNPSEC | Pts | Ref |
|---|---|---|---|---|---|---|---|---|---|---|---|---|---|---|---|---|---|---|
| 2009 | Andy Belmont Racing | 11 | Ford | GRE; 28 | TRI | IOW | SBO | GLN | NHA | TMP | ADI | LRP | NHA | DOV | | 60th | 79 | |
| 2011 | Spraker Racing Enterprises | 37 | Chevy | GRE | SBO | RCH | IOW | BGS | JFC | LGY | NHA | COL | GRE; 18 | NHA; 26 | DOV | 45th | 194 | |

=== ARCA Menards Series ===
(key) (Bold – Pole position awarded by qualifying time. Italics – Pole position earned by points standings or practice time. * – Most laps led.)

ARCA Menards Series results
| Year | Team | No. | Make | 1 | 2 | 3 | 4 | 5 | 6 | 7 | 8 | 9 | 10 | 11 | 12 | 13 | 14 | 15 | 16 | 17 | 18 | 19 | 20 | 21 | 22 | 23 | AMSC | Pts | Ref |
|---|---|---|---|---|---|---|---|---|---|---|---|---|---|---|---|---|---|---|---|---|---|---|---|---|---|---|---|---|---|
| 2007 | Andy Belmont Racing | 62 | Ford | DAY | USA | NSH | SLM | KAN | WIN | KEN | TOL | IOW | POC | MCH | BLN | KEN | POC | NSH | ISF; 33 | MIL | GTW | DSF; 20 | CHI | SLM | TAL | TOL | 111th | 195 | |
| 2008 | Andy Belmont Racing | 1 | Ford | DAY; 6 | SLM; 15 | IOW; 11 | KAN; 13 | CAR; 9 | KEN; 14 | TOL; 10 | POC; 30 | MCH; 23 | CAY; 7 | KEN; 12 | BLN; 9 | POC; 36 | NSH; 11 | ISF; 7 | DSF; 15 | CHI; 30 | SLM; 22 | NJE; 19 | TAL; 27* | TOL; 5 | | | 8th | 4465 | |
| 2009 | Andy Belmont Racing | 1 | Ford | DAY; 25 | SLM; 6 | CAR; 13 | **TAL**; 10 | KEN; 27 | TOL; 3 | POC; 28 | MCH; 17 | MFD; 15 | | | | | | | | | | | | | | | 8th | 4495 | |
| 2009 | RAB Racing | 09 | Ford | | | | | | | | | | IOW; 29 | KEN; 10 | BLN; 10 | POC; 10 | | | | | | | | | | | 8th | 4495 | |
| 2009 | Eddie Sharp Racing | 20 | Ford | | | | | | | | | | | | | | ISF; 23 | CHI; 25 | TOL; 11 | DSF; 18 | NJE; 8 | SLM; 8 | KAN; 14 | CAR; 16 | | | 8th | 4495 | |
| 2010 | Cunningham Motorsports | 77 | Dodge | DAY; 15 | PBE; 4 | SLM; 5 | TEX; 20 | TAL; 8 | TOL; 3 | POC; 19 | MCH; 15 | IOW; 1* | MFD; 8 | POC; 4 | BLN; 4 | NJE; 5 | ISF; 3 | CHI; 7 | DSF; 2 | TOL; 7* | SLM; 3 | KAN; 6 | CAR; 19 | | | | 3rd | 4860 | |
| 2011 | Ken Schrader Racing | 52 | Toyota | DAY; 37 | TAL; 6 | | | | | | | | | | | | | | | | | | | | | | 6th | 4335 | |
| 2011 | Ken Schrader Racing | 52 | Chevy | | | SLM; 7 | TOL; 14 | NJE; 5 | CHI; 6 | POC; 9 | MCH; 29 | WIN; 5 | BLN; 6 | IOW; 8 | IRP; 5 | POC; 4 | ISF; 2 | MAD; 5 | DSF; 26 | SLM; 19 | KAN; 13 | **TOL**; 4* | | | | | 6th | 4335 | |
| 2012 | Ken Schrader Racing | 52 | Toyota | DAY; 10 | | | TAL; 4 | | | | | | | | | | | | | | | | | | | | 10th | 3205 | |
| 2012 | Ken Schrader Racing | 52 | Chevy | | MOB; 9 | SLM; 13 | | TOL; 5 | ELK; 5 | POC; 11 | MCH; 24 | WIN; 21 | NJE; 9 | IOW; 29 | CHI | IRP; 2 | POC | BLN; 4 | ISF | MAD; 6 | SLM; 1* | DSF; C | KAN | | | | 10th | 3205 | |
| 2013 | Cunningham Motorsports | 77 | Dodge | DAY; 12 | MOB; 11 | SLM; 1 | TAL; 26 | TOL; 10 | ELK; 2 | POC; 4 | MCH; 21 | ROA; 3 | WIN; 6 | CHI; 11 | NJE; 2 | POC; 16 | BLN; 8 | ISF; 3 | MAD; 10 | DSF; 2 | IOW; 8 | SLM; 19 | KEN; 11 | KAN; 13 | | | 4th | 5005 | |
| 2014 | Cunningham Motorsports | 77 | Dodge | DAY; 4 | | SLM; 5 | TAL; 1 | TOL; 20 | NJE; 9 | POC; 16 | MCH; 12 | ELK; 2 | | CHI; 9 | IRP; 9 | POC; 3 | BLN; 5 | ISF; 11 | | DSF; 8 | SLM; 1 | KEN; 10 | KAN; 11 | | | | 3rd | 4795 | |
| 2014 | Cunningham Motorsports | 72 | Dodge | | MOB; 10 | | | | | | | | WIN; 13 | | | | | | MAD; 5 | | | | | | | | 3rd | 4795 | |
| 2015 | Cunningham Motorsports | 77 | Dodge | DAY; 11 | | | | TAL; 15* | | NJE; 2 | POC; 6 | MCH; 4 | CHI; 10 | | IOW; 3 | | POC; 25 | | ISF; 5 | DSF; 3 | | KEN; 31 | KAN; 7 | | | | 4th | 2630 | |
| 2015 | Cunningham Motorsports | 77 | Ford | | MOB; 11 | NSH; 19 | SLM; 7 | | TOL; 2 | | | | | WIN; 6 | | IRP; 3 | | BLN; 14 | | | SLM; 17 | | | | | | 4th | 2630 | |
| 2016 | Venturini Motorsports | 25 | Toyota | DAY; 28 | NSH; 12 | SLM; 6 | **TAL**; 6* | TOL; 8 | NJE; 2 | POC; 15 | MCH; 21 | MAD; 5 | WIN; 5 | IOW; 16 | IRP; 10 | POC; 8 | **BLN**; 7* | ISF; 6 | DSF; 1 | SLM; 2 | CHI; 10 | KEN; 4 | KAN; 9 | | | | 2nd | 4755 | |
| 2017 | Venturini Motorsports | 25 | Toyota | **DAY**; 5 | NSH | SLM | TAL; 9 | TOL | ELK | POC | MCH | MAD | IOW | IRP | POC | WIN | ISF; 14 | ROA | DSF; 10 | SLM; 15 | CHI | KEN | KAN | | | | 30th | 900 | |
| 2018 | Venturini Motorsports | 55 | Toyota | DAY; 4 | NSH | SLM | TAL | TOL | CLT | POC | MCH | MAD | GTW | CHI | IOW | ELK | POC | ISF | BLN | DSF | SLM | | | | | | 53rd | 395 | |
| 2018 | Chad Bryant Racing | 22 | Ford | | | | | | | | | | | | | | | | | | | IRP; 9 | KAN | | | | 53rd | 395 | |
| 2022 | Venturini Motorsports | 15 | Toyota | DAY | PHO | TAL | KAN | CLT | IOW | BLN; 2 | | | | | | | | | | | | | | | | | 31st | 113 | |
| 2022 | Venturini Motorsports | 55 | Toyota | | | | | | | | ELK; 6 | MOH | POC | IRP; 11 | MCH | GLN | ISF | MLW | DSF | KAN | BRI | SLM | TOL | | | | 31st | 113 | |
