= Big Clifty, Kentucky =

Census-designated place in Kentucky, United States

- Census-designated place
- Location within Kentucky Location within the United States
- Coordinates: 37°32′44″N 86°9′13″W
- Country: United States
- State: Kentucky
- County: Grayson

Area
  - Total: 1.44 sq mi (3.74 km^{2})
  - Land: 1.44 sq mi (3.73 km^{2})
  - Water: 0.0039 sq mi (0.01 km^{2})
- Elevation: 397 ft (121 m)

Population (2020)
  - Total: 367
  - Density: 254.9/sq mi (98.43/km^{2})
- Time zone: UTC-6 (Central (CST))
  - Summer (DST): UTC-5 (CST)
- ZIP codes: 42712
- FIPS code: 21-06508
- GNIS feature ID: 487153

Big Clifty is an unincorporated community and census-designated place (CDP) in Grayson County, Kentucky, United States. As of the 2020 census, Big Clifty had a population of 367.

== History ==
Clifty Creek crosses U.S. Highway 62 and the P & L railroad several miles to the southwest of Big Clifty. It is said that travelers named the town due to the limestone cliffs that arose on the sides of Clifty Creek.

== Demographics ==
Historical population
Census	Pop.	Note	%±
2020	367		—
U.S. Decennial Census

== Notable people ==
- Nick Higdon (born 1980) former stock car racing driver, born in Big Clifty.
