= General Tire =

American tire manufacturer

Continental Tire the Americas, LLC
- Trade name: General Tire
- Formerly: The General Tire & Rubber Company (1915–1984); General Tire, Inc. (1984–1987)
- Type: Subsidiary
- Industry: Manufacturing
- Predecessor: The Western Rubber & Supply Company (1909–1911); The Western Tire & Rubber Company (1911–1915)
- Founded: September 29, 1915; 111 years ago, in Akron, Ohio, U.S.
- Founders: William Francis O'Neil (General Manager General Tire & Rubber Co.); Winfred E. Fouse (Director, General Tire & Rubber Co.); Charles J. Jahant (vice president, General Tire & Rubber Co.); Robert Iredell (Director, General Tire & Rubber Co.); H.B. Pushee (Chief Chemist, General Tire & Rubber Co.)
- Headquarters: Akron, Ohio (1915–1984); Fairlawn, Ohio (1985–1987); Charlotte, North Carolina (1987–2008); Fort Mill, South Carolina (2008–Present)
- Area served: Worldwide
- Products: Tires
- Parent: Continental AG
- Website: generaltire.com

Continental Tire the Americas, LLC, d.b.a. General Tire, is an American manufacturer of tires for motor vehicles, and semi trucks headquartered in Fort Mill, South Carolina. It was founded in 1915 in Akron, Ohio, by William Francis O'Neil, and four friends as The General Tire & Rubber Company using funding from O'Neil's father.

The company later diversified by 1984 into a conglomerate (GenCorp, Inc.) with holdings in tire manufacturing (General Tire, Inc.), rubber compounds (DiversiTech General), rocketry and aeronautics (Aerojet), and broadcasting (RKO General). The company's tire division was sold to Germany's Continental AG in 1987, becoming Continental General Tire Corp. before its re–incorporation again to its current name. The compounds division was spun off & became OMNOVA Solutions Inc. The rocketry and aeronautics business was kept and expanded, and after a couple company name changes, the parent company eventually became Aerojet Rocketdyne Holdings, Inc.

== Early history ==
General Tire logo c. 1962

William Francis O'Neil owned a Firestone Tire and Rubber Company franchise in Kansas City, Missouri. He started a small manufacturing facility for tire repair products, and called it The Western Rubber & Supply Company initially, then The Western Tire & Rubber Company.

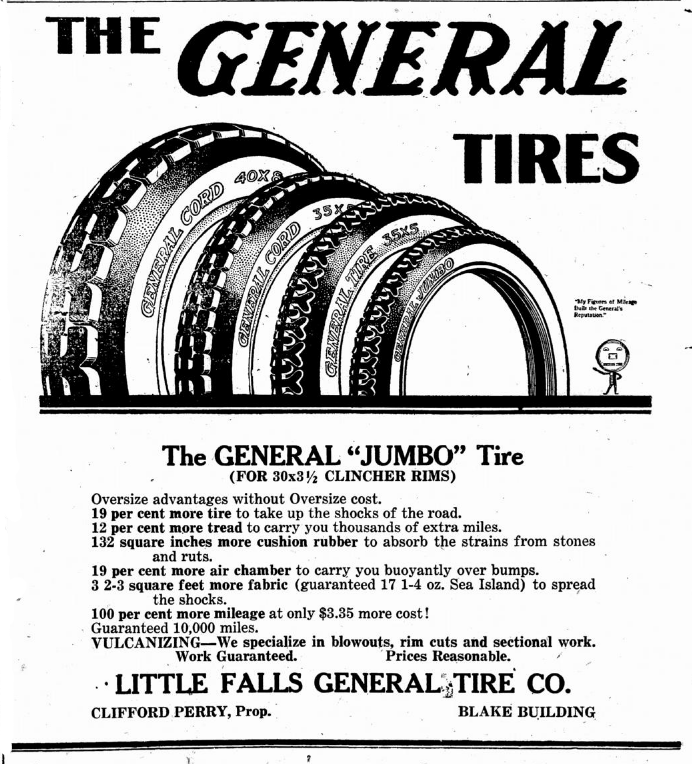
A Little Falls Herald newspaper ad for General Tire c. 1919

As Firestone grew, it sold additional franchises reducing the territories of its earlier franchisees. Dissatisfied, O'Neil decided to compete with Firestone using the expertise he had gained with Western Tire and Rubber. He went into partnership with Winfred E. Fouse, Charles J. Jahant, Robert Iredell, and H.B. Pushee, with funding from his father, Michael O'Neil, who owned O'Neil's Department Store in Akron, Ohio, forming The General Tire & Rubber Company on September 29, 1915, using $200,000 in capital borrowed from his father's store. O'Neil & his associates hired away some managers from Firestone Corp.

Initially, they focused on repair materials, as with Western Tire & Rubber Company, but in 1916 they expanded into tire manufacturing, focusing on high–end products. Early products included:

- General Jumbo, a premium replacement tire for Ford Model Ts.
- Low–pressure General Balloon Jumbo tire.
- Dual 90 tires.

Despite the difficult business climate of World War I, in 1917, O'Neil established a dealership network and began an advertising campaign. By 1930, the company had 14 retail stores and about 1.8% of the tire market. During the depression, as competitors failed, The General Tire & Rubber Company bought out Yale Tire and Rubber Company and India Tire and Rubber Company. By 1933, it had increased market share to 2.7%. This was a relatively large number, considering the company's limited product line.

Between the wars, General Tire started is move away from being exclusively a tire manufacturer and marketer, and in the post war years it really diversified with motion picture and video production, sporting goods, wrought iron, and soft drink production, as well as rubber related chemicals and plastics manufacturing.

== Conglomeration ==
=== Radio, television, and film division ===
Because the Depression was particularly hard on manufacturing, The General Tire & Rubber Company bought several Ohio radio stations on which it advertised. In 1943, it diversified the core business strategy, purchasing the Yankee Network and the radio stations it owned from Boston's Shepard Stores, Inc. Thomas F. O'Neil, son of the founder William F. O'Neil, served as New York Yankees chairman with Shepard's John Shepard III serving as president.

The company continued its move into broadcasting by acquiring the Don Lee Broadcasting System, a well–respected regional radio network on the West Coast, in 1950. Among other stations, it added KHJ-AM–FM in Los Angeles, California, and KFRC-AM-FM in San Francisco, California, to its stable from the New York Yankees acquisition. In 1952, it bought WOR/WOR-FM/WOR-TV in New York City and merged its broadcasting interests into a new division, General Teleradio (purchased from R. H. Macy & Company alongside WOR & Bamberger Broadcasting; named as a result of The General Tire & Rubber Company's increased investment in WOR). RKO/General also added Canadian 50,000 watt power house CKLW in Windsor to the family. The "Big 8" was No. 1 in the Detroit market.

The company's final move into entertainment was the acquisition of RKO Radio Pictures from Howard Hughes in 1955 for $25 million. The General Tire & Rubber Company was interested mainly in using the RKO film library to program its television stations, so it sold the RKO lot at Sunset and Gower in Hollywood, California, to Lucille Ball and Desi Arnaz's Desilu Productions in 1956 for $6 million. The remaining assets of RKO were merged with General Teleradio, and the new company became known initially as RKO Teleradio Pictures, then RKO Teleradio, before eventually becoming RKO General. The radio stations became some of the leading broadcasters in the world, but the division was dragged down by unethical conduct at its television stations. This culminated in the longest licensing dispute in television history, eventually forcing RKO General out of the broadcasting business by 1991.

==== Rocketry and aeronautics division ====
In the late 1930s, the United States Army became interested in rockets. A group of California Institute of Technology engineers won a contract to produce rocket engines to speed airplane liftoff, and formed a company named Aerojet. The group succeeded with liquid–fuel rockets, but needed additional materials science and manufacturing expertise to create more sophisticated solid–fuel rockets. Aerojet went into partnership with The General Tire & Rubber Company, using their capitalization, expertise with rubber binders, and chemical manufacturing facilities. The partnership was renamed Aerojet General.

== Re–incorporation and sale to Continental AG ==
General Tire's restructuring plan went forward; General Tire and its industrial products, and chemicals, and plastics divisions, along with Aerojet General and RKO General, Inc., became subsidiaries of the holding company GenCorp, Inc. in 1984.

In 1987, GenCorp, Inc. underwent large–scale restructuring, in part to ward off a hostile takeover attempt by General Acquisition, Inc., including selling off its flagship tire division, General Tire, to German tire manufacturer Continental AG in 1987. General Tire still exists today as Continental Tire of North America.

== Sponsorships ==
General Tire is a sponsor of the following:

- Major League Fishing – Official Partner of Major League Fishing
- ARCA Menards Series – Official tire supplier of the ARCA Menards Series
- NASCAR Canada Series – Official tire supplier the NASCAR Canada Series
- Jeep Jamboree USA – Official Partner of Jeep Jamboree USA
