= Michael Simko =

American racing driver (born 1981)

- Born: May 23, 1981 (age 45); Clarkston, Michigan, U.S.

ARCA Menards Series career
- 51 races run over 12 years
- Best finish: 21st (2005)
- First race: 2001 Jasper Engines & Transmissions 200 (Toledo)
- Last race: 2012 Berlin ARCA 200 presented by Hantz Group (Berlin)
Wins	Top tens	Poles
0	17	0
- Statistics up to date as of December 3, 2022.

Michael Simko (born May 23, 1981) is an American professional racing driver. He competed in the ARCA Racing Series from 2001 to 2012 with 17 top-ten finishes. He is the son of former NASCAR Winston Cup Series driver David Simko.

== Racing career ==
In 2001, Simko would make his ARCA Re/Max Series debut at Toledo Speedway driving the No. 96 Chevrolet, finishing 20th after starting 12th. In 2002, he would make three more starts, one for Bob Schacht at Toledo, one for his own team at Winchester Speedway, and one for Arne Henriksen at Salem Speedway. He would finish sixth at Toledo and Salem respectively. For 2003, he would run five races, finishing eighth at Kentucky Speedway driving for Mark Gibson.

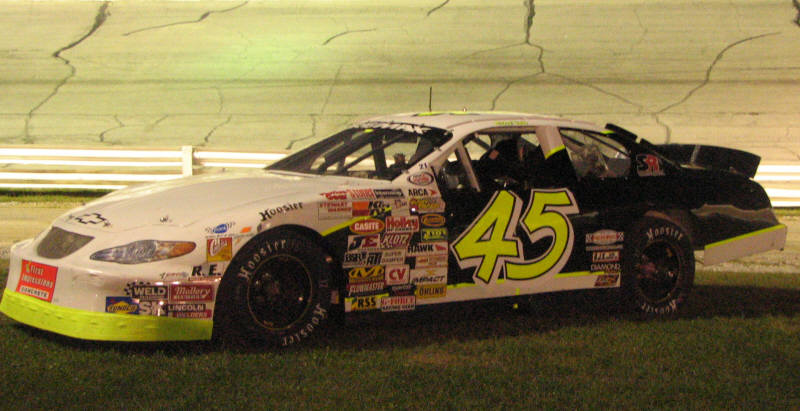
Simko's No. 45 car at Salem Speedway, Indiana

In 2004, he would make seven starts, with six of those starts coming with Schacht, and one coming with Greg Sarff at Chicagoland Speedway, where he would finish seventh. In the following year, he would run 13 of the 23 races of the schedule driving the No. 45 entry for father David Simko. His best finish would come in his last start of the year at Salem, where he would lead 39 laps to finish third in the race. In 2006, he would solely run in a Chevrolet, and would get four top-10's, including a best finish of fourth at Winchester.

== Fight and suspension ==
On September 26, ten days after his last ARCA start of 2006 at Salem, Simko was involved in a crash with Don St. Denis on the 112th lap of the Great Lakes Chevy Dealers/Budweiser Glass City 200 at Toledo Speedway. After the crash, Simko climbed out of his car and ran over to St. Denis, who was unable to shut off his car at the time due to a piece of plexiglass that fell by the ignition switch, and made a running jump and landed both feet into the windshield of St. Denis' car. Afterwards, Simko would throw his helmet at St. Denis' car and walk away. St. Denis would then get out of the car and run over to Simko in the infield of the track where the two engaged in a fist-fight with several punches being thrown as race officials tried to break up the fight. Since the series that hosted the event was sanctioned by ARCA, both Simko and St. Denis were suspended indefinitely from all ARCA-sanctioned events. Both Simko and St. Denis would later apologize for said incident and were later reinstated.

== Racing return ==
In 2007, Simko would make his ARCA Re/Max Series return at Salem driving the No. 75 Chevrolet for Bob Schacht Motorsports, where he would finish sixth after starting eleventh. He would make another start that year at Toledo, where he would finish third. He would run three more races with the team in 2008, getting a best finish of 11th at Toledo. Simko would drive the No. 27 Chevrolet for Don DeWitt for three races, finishing tenth at Chicagoland Speedway. He would make three more starts for DeWitt over the next two seasons, finishing in the top ten at Berlin Raceway in 2010 and 2011 with eighth and ninth respectively. In 2012, he would run two races, finishing 17th at Iowa Speedway with Hendren Motorsports in the No. 41 Chevrolet, and 14th at Berlin with Venturini Motorsports in the No. 35 Toyota. The latter event would be his most recent ARCA start.

Since his last ARCA start, Simko has recently competed in the CRA Super Series and the CRA Jegs All-Stars Tour.

== Motorsports results ==
=== Stock car career summary ===
Season	Series	Team	Races	Wins	Top 5	Top 10	Points	Position
2001	ARCA Re/Max Series	N/A	1	0	0	0	130	148th
2002	ARCA Re/Max Series	Bob Schacht Motorsports	1	0	0	1	585	47th
2002	ARCA Re/Max Series	Michael Simko	1	0	0	0	585	47th
2002	ARCA Re/Max Series	ECC Motorsports	1	0	0	1	585	47th
2003	ARCA Re/Max Series	Bob Schacht Motorsports	4	0	0	1	755	35th
2003	ARCA Re/Max Series	Mark Gibson Racing	1	0	0	1	755	35th
2003	ARCA Re/Max Series	ECC Motorsports	0	0	0	0	755	35th
2004	ARCA Re/Max Series	Bob Schacht Motorsports	6	0	0	1	1080	23rd
2004	ARCA Re/Max Series	Capital City Motorsports	1	0	0	1	1080	23rd
2005	ARCA Re/Max Series	Auburn Racing	13	0	1	2	2195	21st
2006	ARCA Re/Max Series	Auburn Racing Enterprises	9	0	1	4	1215	34th
2007	ARCA Re/Max Series	Bob Schacht Motorsports	2	0	1	2	415	62nd
2008	ARCA Re/Max Series	Bob Schacht Motorsports	3	0	0	0	645	48th
2009	ARCA Re/Max Series	D&B Motorsports	3	0	0	1	355	74th
2010	ARCA Racing Series	D&B Motorsports	2	0	0	1	340	64th
2011	ARCA Racing Series	D&B Motorsports	1	0	0	1	185	97th
2012	ARCA Racing Series	Hendren Motorsports	1	0	0	0	305	71st
2012	ARCA Racing Series	Venturini Motorsports	1	0	0	0	305	71st
2020	CARS Super Late Model Tour	Michael Simko	2	0	0	0	0	N/A
2021	CARS Super Late Model Tour	Michael Simko	1	0	0	0	0	N/A
2023	ASA STARS National Tour	Michael Simko	1	0	0	0	36	77th
2024	ASA STARS National Tour	Michael Simko	2	0	0	0	88	33rd
2025	ASA STARS National Tour	David Simko	0	0	0	0	5	84th
2026	ASA STARS National Tour	Michael Simko Racing	3	0	0	1		

=== ARCA Racing Series ===
(key) (Bold – Pole position awarded by qualifying time. Italics – Pole position earned by points standings or practice time. * – Most laps led.)

ARCA Racing Series results
Year	Team	No.	Make	1	2	3	4	5	6	7	8	9	10	11	12	13	14	15	16	17	18	19	20	21	22	23	24	25	ARSC	Pts	Ref
2001	?	96	Chevy	DAY	NSH	WIN	SLM	GTY	KEN	CLT	KAN	MCH	POC	MEM	GLN	KEN	MCH	POC	NSH	ISF	CHI	DSF	SLM	TOL; 20	BLN	CLT	TAL	ATL	148th	130	
2002	Bob Schacht Motorsports	75	Ford	DAY	ATL	NSH	SLM	KEN	CLT	KAN	POC	MCH	TOL; 6	SBO	KEN	BLN	POC	NSH	ISF										47th	585	
2002	Michael Simko	38	Chevy																	WIN; 14	DSF	CHI							47th	585	
2002	ECC Motorsports	17	Chevy																				SLM; 6	TAL	CLT				47th	585	
2003	Bob Schacht Motorsports	75	Chevy	DAY	ATL	NSH	SLM; 10	TOL; 27																					35th	755	
2003	Mark Gibson Racing	56	Chevy						KEN; 8	CLT	BLN	KAN																	35th	755	
2003	Bob Schacht Motorsports	75	Pontiac										MCH; 14	LER	POC	POC	NSH	ISF	WIN	DSF	CHI; 25	SLM	TAL	CLT					35th	755	
2003	ECC Motorsports	17	Chevy																						SBO; DNQ				35th	755	
2004	Bob Schacht Motorsports	75	Chevy	DAY	NSH	SLM	KEN	TOL; 16				MCH; 20	SBO	BLN	KEN; 11	GTW	POC	LER	NSH	ISF	TOL; 21	DSF		SLM; 25	TAL				23rd	1080	
2004	Bob Schacht Motorsports	39	Chevy						CLT; 10	KAN	POC																		23rd	1080	
2004	Capital City Motorsports	38	Chevy																				CHI; 7						23rd	1080	
2005	Auburn Racing	45	Chevy	DAY	NSH; 21		KEN; 14					MCH; 26	KAN	KEN; 20	BLN	POC	GTW	LER; 18	NSH	MCH; 24	ISF	TOL; 13	DSF	CHI; 10	SLM; 3				21st	2195	
2005	Auburn Racing	45	Pontiac			SLM; 12		TOL; 11	LAN; 32	MIL; 12	POC																		21st	2195	
2005	Auburn Racing	45	Ford																							TAL; QL^{†}			21st	2195	
2006	Auburn Racing Enterprises	45	Chevy	DAY	NSH; DNQ	SLM; 28	WIN; 4	KEN	TOL; 7	POC	MCH; 23	KAN	KEN; 32	BLN; 10	POC	GTW	NSH	MCH; 34	ISF	MIL				SLM; 32	TAL	IOW			34th	1215	
2006	Auburn Racing Enterprises	65	Chevy																		TOL; 6	DSF	CHI						34th	1215	
2007	Bob Schacht Motorsports	75	Chevy	DAY	USA	NSH	SLM	KAN	WIN	KEN	TOL	IOW	POC	MCH	BLN	KEN	POC	NSH	ISF	MIL	GTW	DSF	CHI	SLM; 6	TAL				62nd	415	
2007	Bob Schacht Motorsports	75	Ford																							TOL; 3			62nd	415	
2008	Bob Schacht Motorsports	75	Chevy	DAY	SLM	IOW	KAN	CAR	KEN	TOL; 11	POC													TOL; 27					48th	645	
2008	Bob Schacht Motorsports	75	Ford									MCH; 22	CAY	KEN	BLN	POC	NSH	ISF	DSF	CHI	SLM	NJE	TAL						48th	645	
2009	D&B Motorsports	27	Chevy	DAY	SLM	CAR	TAL	KEN	TOL	POC	MCH; 29	MFD	IOW	KEN	BLN; 28	POC	ISF	CHI; 10	TOL	DSF	NJE	SLM	KAN	CAR					74th	355	
2010	D&B Motorsports	27	Chevy	DAY	PBE	SLM	TEX	TAL	TOL	POC	MCH; 16	IOW	MFD	POC	BLN; 8	NJE	ISF	CHI	DSF	TOL	SLM	KAN	CAR						64th	340	
2011	D&B Motorsports	27	Chevy	DAY	TAL	SLM	TOL	NJE	CHI	POC	MCH	WIN	BLN; 9	IOW	IRP	POC	ISF	MAD	DSF	SLM	KAN	TOL							97th	185	
2012	Hendren Motorsports	41	Chevy	DAY	MOB	SLM	TAL	TOL	ELK	POC	MCH	WIN	NJE	IOW; 17	CHI	IRP	POC												71st	305	
2012	Venturini Motorsports	35	Toyota															BLN; 14	ISF	MAD	SLM	DSF	KAN						71st	305	
^{†} - Qualified but replaced by Robert Richardson Jr.

=== CARS Super Late Model Tour ===
(key)

CARS Super Late Model Tour results
Year	Team	No.	Make	1	2	3	4	5	6	7	8	CSLMTC	Pts	Ref
2020	Michael Simko	45S	Chevy	SNM	HCY	JEN; 19	HCY	FCS	BRI; 15	FLC	NSH	N/A	0	
2021	Michael Simko	45	Chevy	HCY	GPS	NSH; 13	JEN	HCY	MMS	TCM	SBO	N/A	0	

=== ASA STARS National Tour ===
(key) (Bold – Pole position awarded by qualifying time. Italics – Pole position earned by points standings or practice time. * – Most laps led. ** – All laps led.)

ASA STARS National Tour results
Year	Team	No.	Make	1	2	3	4	5	6	7	8	9	10	11	12	ASNTC	Pts	Ref
2023	Michael Simko	45	Ford	FIF	MAD	NWS	HCY	MLW	AND	WIR	TOL; 16	WIN	NSV			77th	36	
2024	Michael Simko	45	Ford	NSM	FIF	HCY	MAD	MLW	AND	OWO; 11	TOL; 14	WIN	NSV			33rd	80	
2025	David Simko	51	N/A	NSM	FIF	DOM	HCY	NPS	MAD	SLG	AND	OWO	TOL; DNS	WIN	NSV	84th	5	
2026	Michael Simko Racing	45	Chevy	NSM	FIF	HCY	SLG	MAD	NPS	OWO; 6	TRI	WIN; 13	NSV; 20	NSM		-*	-*	
