= Gabi DiCarlo =

American racing driver

- Born: July 10, 1985 (age 41); Phoenix, Arizona, U.S.

NASCAR FedEx Freight Truck Series career
- 3 races run over 1 year
- Best finish: 54th (2009)
- First race: 2009 San Bernardino County 200 (Fontana)
- Last race: 2009 O'Reilly Auto Parts 250 (Kansas)
Wins	Top tens	Poles
0	0	0

ARCA Menards Series career
- 51 races run over 3 years
- Best finish: 11th (2007)
- First race: 2007 Construct Corps / Palm Beach Grading 250 (Lakeland)
- Last race: 2009 Kentuckiana Ford Dealers ARCA Fall Classic (Salem)
Wins	Top tens	Poles
0	3	0

Gabi DiCarlo (born July 10, 1985) is a former American stock car racing driver. DiCarlo competed in the X-1R Pro Cup Series, the ARCA Racing Series, and the NASCAR Camping World Truck Series. DiCarlo competed in 51 career ARCA races between 2007 and 2009, and achieved a career best ninth-place finish at Kansas Speedway in 2008. She competed in three races during the 2009 NASCAR Camping World Truck Series season. DiCarlo made her series debut at the 2009 San Bernardino County 200 at Auto Club Speedway. Her best NASCAR Truck Series finish was an 18th at Kansas Speedway.

== Motorsports career results ==
=== NASCAR ===
(key) (Bold – Pole position awarded by qualifying time. Italics – Pole position earned by points standings or practice time. * – Most laps led.)

==== Camping World Truck Series ====
NASCAR Camping World Truck Series results
Year	Team	No.	Make	1	2	3	4	5	6	7	8	9	10	11	12	13	14	15	16	17	18	19	20	21	22	23	24	25	NCWTC	Pts	Ref
2009	Stringer Motorsports	90	Toyota	DAY	CAL; 19	ATL; 24	MAR	KAN; 18	CLT	DOV	TEX	MCH	MLW	MEM	KEN	IRP	NSH	BRI	CHI	IOW	GTW	NHA	LVS	MAR	TAL	TEX	PHO	HOM	54th	306	

=== ARCA Re/Max Series ===
(key) (Bold – Pole position awarded by qualifying time. Italics – Pole position earned by points standings or practice time. * – Most laps led.)

ARCA Re/Max Series results
Year	Team	No.	Make	1	2	3	4	5	6	7	8	9	10	11	12	13	14	15	16	17	18	19	20	21	22	23	ARMC	Pts	Ref
2007	Stringer Motorsports	57	Chevy	DAY; DNQ																							11th	3960	
2007	Stringer Motorsports	90	Ford		USA; 22		SLM; 34			KEN; 32	TOL; 23	IOW; 14					POC; 18	NSH; 23	ISF; 18	MIL; 15		DSF; 18		SLM; 16			11th	3960	
2007	Stringer Motorsports	90	Chevy			NSH; 20		KAN; 23	WIN; 11				POC; 32	MCH; 19	BLN; 24	KEN; 26					GTW; 20		CHI; 21		TAL; 24	TOL; 22	11th	3960	
2008	Stringer Motorsports	90	Chevy	DAY; 20				CAR; 25		TOL; 33			CAY; 23		BLN; 29									TOL; 29			14th	3790	
2008	Stringer Motorsports	90	Ford		SLM; 25													ISF; 25	DSF; 22								14th	3790	
2008	Stringer Motorsports	90	Toyota			IOW; 26	KAN; 9		KEN; 25		POC; 10	MCH; 15		KEN; 17		POC; 10	NSH; 40			CHI; 17	SLM; 13	NJE; 12	TAL; 33				14th	3790	
2009	Stringer Motorsports	90	Toyota	DAY; 31	SLM	CAR; 14	TAL	KEN; 12	TOL	POC; 30	MCH	MFD				POC; 18	ISF	CHI	TOL	DSF	NJE; 12	SLM; 11	KAN	CAR			31st	1100	
2009	Stringer Motorsports	90	Chevy										IOW; 20	KEN	BLN												31st	1100	
