= Donny Kelley =

American racing driver

- Born: March 1, 1960 (age 66); Humble, Texas, U.S.

ARCA Menards Series career
- 21 races run over 3 years
- Best finish: 18th (2008)
- First race: 2004 ARCA Re/Max 200 (South Boston)
- Last race: 2008 Hantz Group 200 (Toledo)
Wins	Top tens	Poles
0	3	0
- Statistics up to date as of July 9, 2023.

Donny Kelley (born March 1, 1960) is an American former professional stock car racing driver and team owner who has previously competed in the ARCA Re/Max Series.

== Racing career ==
In 2004, Kelley would make his ARCA Re/Max Series debut at South Boston Speedway, driving the No. 71 Chevrolet for his own team, where he would start nineteenth but finish 23rd due to electrical issues. After not making another start in the series for the next three years, he would drive the No. 23 Chevrolet for Hixson Motorsports at Salem Speedway, where he would finish 29th due to a crash. He would then run with the team for the remainder of the year, getting nine top-twenty finishes with a best result of fourteenth at Talladega Superspeedway on his way to finish eighteenth in the points despite not racing at the season opening race at Daytona International Speedway. For the following year, he would form his own team, PGM Racing, and sign fellow Humble, Texas native Stephan McCurley to drive the No. 03 Chevrolet for the full schedule, although they would run select races following that years event at Mansfield Motorsports Park. Kelley would enter in the race at Daytona for 2010, but would withdraw from the event. He has not made another attempt in the series since then, as the season ending race of 2008 at Toledo Speedway would be his most recent start as a driver.

== Personal life ==
Kelley is currently the president of Porter Glass & Mirror Inc., which had served as his sponsor during his driving career.

== Motorsports results ==
=== ARCA Racing Series ===
(key) (Bold – Pole position awarded by qualifying time. Italics – Pole position earned by points standings or practice time. * – Most laps led.)

ARCA Racing Series results
Year	Team	No.	Make	1	2	3	4	5	6	7	8	9	10	11	12	13	14	15	16	17	18	19	20	21	22	ARSC	Pts	Ref
2004	PGM Racing	71	Chevy	DAY	NSH	SLM	KEN	TOL	CLT	KAN	POC	MCH	SBO; 23	BLN	KEN	GTW	POC	LER	NSH	ISF	TOL	DSF	CHI	SLM	TAL	151st	115	
2008	Hixson Motorsports	23	Chevy	DAY	SLM; 29	IOW; 22	KAN; 34	CAR; 19	KEN; 18	TOL; 28	POC; 18	MCH; 27	CAY; 24	KEN; 33	BLN; 19	POC; 18	NSH; 30	ISF; 16	DSF; 27	CHI; 21	SLM; 18	NJE; 25	TAL; 14	TOL; 16		18th	3320	
2010	PGM Racing	03	Chevy	DAY; Wth	PBE	SLM	TEX	TAL	TOL	POC	MCH	IOW	MFD	POC	BLN	NJE	ISF	CHI	DSF	TOL	SLM	KAN	CAR			N/A	0	
