= 2008 ARCA Re/Max Series =

American motorsport season

2008 ARCA Re/Max Series season

Seasons
- ← 2007 2009 →

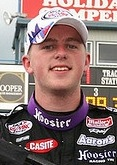
Justin Allgaier, the 2008 ARCA champion.

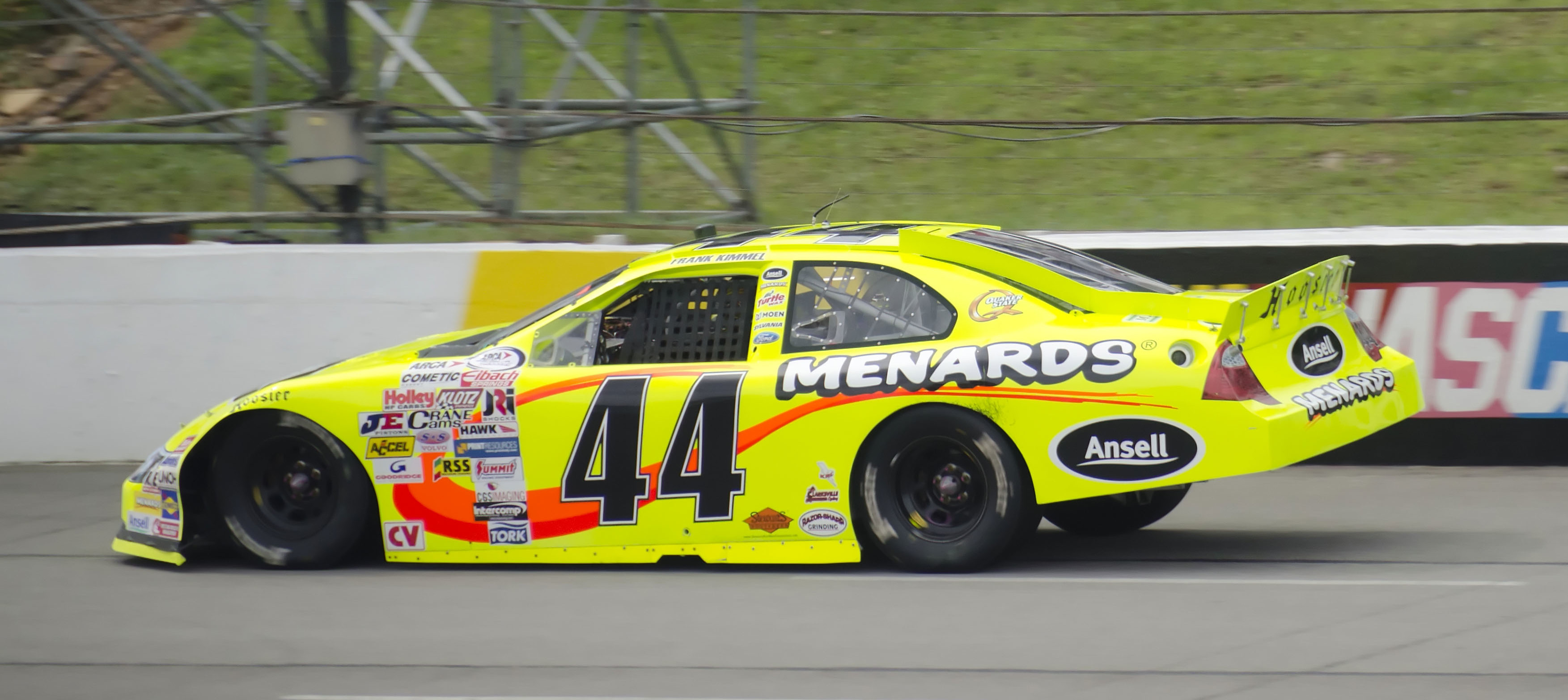
Frank Kimmel, now driving the No. 44 car for his family team, finished second in the championship behind Allgaier by just 50 points. This ended his streak of eight consecutive championships.

The 2008 ARCA Re/Max Series was the 56th season of the ARCA Racing Series. The season began on February 9, 2008 at Daytona International Speedway with the Daytona ARCA 200 and ended on October 12, 2008 at Toledo Speedway with the Hantz Group 200. Justin Allgaier, driving for his family team, Allgaier Motorsports, won the season championship, after championship contenders entering the season finale Scott Speed and Ricky Stenhouse Jr. collided with each other. Frank Kimmel, who won the series championship in nine of the previous ten seasons, barely lost the title this season to Allgaier. Kimmel had moved from the No. 46 Clement Racing car, which he won all of his titles in, to the No. 44 car for his family team this season. Kimmel's replacement in the No. 46, Matt Carter, would finish third in the championship.

== Teams and drivers ==
| Team | Manufacturer | No. | Driver | Rounds |
Full Time
| Andy Belmont Racing | Ford | 1 | Tom Hessert III | All |
| Andy Belmont Racing | Ford | 14 | Jake Francis | 1 |
| Andy Belmont Racing | Ford | 14 | Grant Enfinger | 5 |
| Andy Belmont Racing | Ford | 14 | Ted Olswfski | 1 |
| Andy Belmont Racing | Ford | 14 | John Graham | 2 |
| Andy Belmont Racing | Ford | 14 | Dominick Casola | 1 |
| Fast Track Racing | Dodge; Chevrolet | 14 | Chase Mattioli | 2 |
| Fast Track Racing | Dodge; Chevrolet | 14 | Ed Pompa | 1 |
| Venturini Motorsports | Chevrolet | 14 | Tom Berte | 1 |
| James Hylton Racing | Dodge | 14 | James Hylton | 2 |
| Stott Classic Racing | Chevrolet | 14 | Lance Stott | 2 |
| Mullins Racing | Chevrolet | 14 | Willie Mullins | 1 |
| Eddie Sharp Racing | Toyota | 2 | Scott Speed | All |
| Eddie Sharp Racing | Toyota | 22 | Ken Butler III | All |
| Eddie Sharp Racing | Dodge | 20 | Pierre Bourque | 1 |
| Eddie Sharp Racing | Dodge | 20 | Justin Lofton | 19 |
| Cunningham Motorsports | Dodge | 4 | Tayler Malsam | All |
| Cunningham Motorsports | Dodge | 45 | Nur Ali | 2 |
| Cunningham Motorsports | Dodge | 45 | Michael Phelps | 19 |
| Baker Curb Racing | Ford | 8 | Blake Feese | 1 |
| Rabenold Racing | Chevrolet | 8 | Kory Rabenold | 2 |
| Jones Group Racing | Dodge | 8 | Terry Jones | 1 |
| Venturini Motorsports | Toyota | 8 | Marc Davis | 1 |
| Norm Benning Racing | Chevrolet | 8 | Barry Layne | 1 |
| Norm Benning Racing | Chevrolet | 8 | Jeremy Petty | 1 |
| Norm Benning Racing | Chevrolet | 8 | Greg Seevers | 8 |
| Norm Benning Racing | Chevrolet | 8 | Mike Zazula | 3 |
| Norm Benning Racing | Chevrolet | 8 | Brad Yunker | 1 |
| Norm Benning Racing | Chevrolet | 84 | Norm Benning | 20 |
| Norm Benning Racing | Chevrolet | 84 | Greg Seevers | 1 |
| Wayne Peterson Racing | Chevrolet; Ford | 06 | Tim Mitchell | All |
| RAB Racing | Ford | 09 | John Wes Townley | All |
| Fast Track Racing | Ford; Chevrolet | 11 | Bryan Silas | All |
| Allgaier Motorsports | Chevrolet | 16 | Justin Allgaier | All |
| Hixson Motorsports | Chevrolet | 23 | Brandon Kelley | 1 |
| Hixson Motorsports | Chevrolet | 23 | Donny Kelley | 20 |
| Elite 2 Racing | Chevrolet | 24 | Mike Harmon | 20 |
| Elite 2 Racing | Chevrolet | 24 | Jim Walker | 1 |
| Venturini Motorsports | Chevrolet | 25 | Ryan Fischer | 6 |
| Venturini Motorsports | Chevrolet | 25 | Tom Berte | 2 |
| Venturini Motorsports | Chevrolet | 25 | Joey Logano | 1 |
| Venturini Motorsports | Chevrolet | 25 | Brian Scott | 6 |
| Venturini Motorsports | Chevrolet | 25 | Scott Lagasse Jr. | 1 |
| Brett Hudson Motorsports | Chevrolet | 25 | Brett Hudson | 2 |
| Danny Bopp Racing | Chevrolet | 25 | Daniel Bopp | 1 |
| Rich Woodland Racing | Chevrolet; Toyota | 25 | Brian Tyler | 2 |
| Brad Smith Motorsports | Ford | 26 | Brad Smith | All |
| Win-Tron Racing | Dodge | 32 | Dominick Casola | 9 |
| Win-Tron Racing | Dodge | 32 | Andy Hanson | 2 |
| Win-Tron Racing | Dodge | 32 | Chris Wimmer | 1 |
| Win-Tron Racing | Dodge | 32 | James Buescher | 6 |
| Win-Tron Racing | Dodge | 32 | Matt Merrell | 2 |
| Win-Tron Racing | Dodge | 32 | Bradley Riethmeyer | 1 |
| Darrell Basham Racing | Chevrolet | 34 | Darrell Basham | All |
| Darrell Basham Racing | Chevrolet | 94 | Jason Basham | 11 |
| Darrell Basham Racing | Chevrolet | 94 | Corey LaCosta | 1 |
| Darrell Basham Racing | Chevrolet | 94 | Justin Koch | 1 |
| Fadden Racing | Ford | 94 | Max Dumarey | 3 |
| Mystic Motorsports | Ford | 94 | Brian Kaltreider | 2 |
| 74 Operations, LLC | Chevrolet | 94 | J. R. Heffner | 1 |
| Bozell Racing | Dodge | 94 | Phil Bozell | 1 |
| Spraker Racing Enterprises | Chevrolet | 37 | Dexter Bean | All |
| 74 Operations, LLC | Chevrolet | 39 | J. R. Heffner | 1 |
| Ryan Hackett Racing | Ford | 39 | Ryan Hackett | 1 |
| Matt Hawkins Racing | Dodge | 39 | Matt Hawkins | 5 |
| Brett Hudson Motorsports | Dodge | 39 | Brett Hudson | 1 |
| Roulo Brothers Racing | Ford | 39 | David Ragan | 2 |
| Roulo Brothers Racing | Ford | 39 | Peter Shepherd III | 1 |
| Roulo Brothers Racing | Ford | 39 | Mark Thompson | 1 |
| Kory Rabenold Racing | Chevrolet | 39 | Kory Rabenold | 4 |
| Hoddick Racing | Dodge | 39 | Todd Hoddick | 1 |
| Kelly Kovski Motorsports | Chevrolet | 39 | Kelly Kovski | 2 |
| Kimmel Racing | Ford | 44 | Frank Kimmel | All |
| Clement Racing | Ford | 46 | Matt Carter | All |
| James Hylton Racing | Dodge | 48 | James Hylton | 10 |
| James Hylton Racing | Dodge | 48 | Luke Hall | 1 |
| James Hylton Racing | Dodge | 48 | Marcus Fux | 1 |
| Sappanos-Bozell Racing | Dodge | 48 | Phil Bozell | 1 |
| Venturini Motorsports | Chevrolet | 48 | Tom Berte | 1 |
| Capital City Motorsports | Dodge | 48 | Jake Francis | 3 |
| Capital City Motorsports | Dodge | 48 | Ben Stancill | 1 |
| TRG Motorsports | Chevrolet | 48 | Ben Stancill | 2 |
| TRG Motorsports | Chevrolet | 48 | Andy Lally | 1 |
| Sheltra Motorsports | Chevrolet; Dodge | 60 | Patrick Sheltra | All |
| Stringer Motorsports | Chevrolet; Toyota | 90 | Gabi DiCarlo | All |
| Roush-Fenway Racing | Ford | 99 | Ricky Stenhouse Jr. | All |
Part Time
| Wayne Peterson Racing | Chevrolet; Ford | 0 | Butch Jarvis | 1 |
| Wayne Peterson Racing | Chevrolet; Ford | 0 | Wayne Peterson | 17 |
| James Hylton Racing | Dodge | 0 | James Hylton | 1 |
| Jeremy Clements Racing | Chevrolet | 3 | Jeremy Clements | 8 |
| Bobby Gerhart Racing | Chevrolet | 5 | Bobby Gerhart | 15 |
| Bobby Gerhart Racing | Chevrolet | 7 | Kyle Krisiloff | 1 |
| Doug Keller Racing | Chevrolet | 5 | Doug Keller | 2 |
| Jake Francis, Inc. | Chevrolet | 7 | Jake Francis | 1 |
| K&M Motorsports | Chevrolet | 7 | Frank Kapfhammer | 4 |
| ECC Motorsports | Ford; Toyota | 7 | A. J. Henriksen | 7 |
| Jeff Caudell Racing | Chevrolet | 7 | Jeff Caudell | 1 |
| Arnold Motorsports | Dodge | 7 | Lee Arnold | 1 |
| Mark Dimitroff Racing | Chevrolet | 7 | Mark Dimitroff | 1 |
| Win-Tron Racing | Dodge | 9 | James Buescher | 1 |
| Gillett Evernham Motorsports | Dodge | 9 | Chase Miller | 1 |
| Brad Keselowski Racing | Chevrolet; Ford | 00 | Robb Brent | 9 |
| Brad Keselowski Racing | Chevrolet; Ford | 00 | Matt Kurzejewski | 1 |
| Ralph Solhem Racing | Chevrolet | 00 | Ed Kennedy | 1 |
| Hattori Woodland Racing | Toyota | 01 | Brian Tyler | 1 |
| Hattori Woodland Racing | Toyota | 01 | Justin Marks | 2 |
| Hattori Woodland Racing | Toyota | 01 | Sean Caisse | 5 |
| Hattori Woodland Racing | Toyota | 01 | Chrissy Wallace | 1 |
| Hattori Woodland Racing | Toyota | 01 | Brent Glastetter | 1 |
| Eddie Sharp Racing | Dodge | 02 | Pierre Bourque | 2 |
| Boyer-Rimi Racing | Chevrolet | 05 | Jeff Boyer | 1 |
| Fast Track Racing | Dodge; Chevrolet; Ford | 10 | A. J. Genail | 2 |
| Fast Track Racing | Dodge; Chevrolet; Ford | 10 | Chad McCumbee | 1 |
| Fast Track Racing | Dodge; Chevrolet; Ford | 10 | Chase Mattioli | 3 |
| Fast Track Racing | Dodge; Chevrolet; Ford | 10 | Charlie Vest | 3 |
| Fast Track Racing | Dodge; Chevrolet; Ford | 21 | Mike Holt | 1 |
| DGM Racing | Chevrolet | 12 | Alli Owens | 12 |
| DGM Racing | Chevrolet | 21 | Mario Gosselin | 1 |
| DGM Racing | Chevrolet | 72 | John Jackson | 1 |
| DGM Racing | Chevrolet | 98 | Andrew Ranger | 1 |
| RFMS Racing | Ford | 12 | A. J. Fike | 2 |
| DMT Motorsports | Chevrolet | 13 | Michael Phelps | 1 |
| Venturini Motorsports | Chevrolet; Toyota | 15 | Brian Scott | 1 |
| Venturini Motorsports | Chevrolet; Toyota | 15 | Ryan Fischer | 1 |
| Venturini Motorsports | Chevrolet; Toyota | 15 | Marc Davis | 1 |
| Venturini Motorsports | Chevrolet; Toyota | 15 | Bill Conger | 1 |
| Venturini Motorsports | Chevrolet; Toyota | 15 | Tom Berte | 1 |
| Venturini Motorsports | Chevrolet; Toyota | 15 | Joey Logano | 1 |
| Venturini Motorsports | Chevrolet; Toyota | 47 | Tom Berte | 2 |
| Allgaier Motorsports | Chevrolet | 15 | Dave Savicki | 1 |
| Brad Hill Racing | Ford | 17 | Eddie Pearson | 1 |
| Leslie Racing | Ford | 18 | Billy Leslie | 11 |
| D'Hondt Motorsports | Toyota | 19 | Jack Bailey | 2 |
| Bowsher Racing | Ford | 21 | Michel Disdier | 2 |
| Bowsher Racing | Ford | 21 | Todd Bowsher | 4 |
| Bowsher Racing | Ford | 21 | James Hylton | 1 |
| Bowsher Racing | Ford | 21 | Tom Graham | 1 |
| Bowsher Racing | Ford | 91 | Todd Bowsher | 1 |
| ACG Motorsports | Chevrolet | 21 | Chris Cockrum | 2 |
| ACG Motorsports | Chevrolet | 87 | Chris Cockrum | 1 |
| Kirk Shelmerdine Racing | Chevrolet | 27 | Kirk Shelmerdine | 1 |
| Bill Davis Racing | Toyota | 28 | Michael Annett | 5 |
| Team LaCross Motorsports | Chevrolet | 29 | Brent Cross | 1 |
| Team LaCross Motorsports | Chevrolet | 59 | Brent Cross | 1 |
| Hixson Motorsports | Chevrolet | 29 | Ron Cox | 5 |
| Hixson Motorsports | Chevrolet | 29 | Jeremy Petty | 1 |
| Hixson Motorsports | Chevrolet | 29 | Jeff Buice | 2 |
| Hixson Motorsports | Chevrolet | 29 | Mark Dimitroff | 1 |
| Hixson Motorsports | Chevrolet | 29 | Steve Fox | 1 |
| Hixson Motorsports | Chevrolet | 29 | Will Kimmel | 1 |
| Brett Hudson Motorsports | Dodge | 29 | Brett Hudson | 2 |
| Dale Earnhardt, Inc. | Chevrolet | 29 | Aric Almirola | 1 |
| Penske Racing | Dodge | 29 | Billy Wease | 1 |
| Cunningham Motorsports | Dodge | 29 | Brandon Thomson | 1 |
| Cunningham Motorsports | Dodge | 77 | Parker Kligerman | 2 |
| Jones Group Racing | Dodge | 30 | Terry Jones | 7 |
| Jones Group Racing | Dodge | 30 | Jesse Smith | 8 |
| Jones Group Racing | Dodge | 30 | Chad Blount | 1 |
| Wangerin Racing | Dodge | 31 | Troy Wangerin | 2 |
| Richard Childress Racing | Chevrolet | 31 | Austin Dillon | 1 |
| Tori Racing | Chevrolet | 33 | Curt Tori | 3 |
| Kevin Harvick, Inc. | Chevrolet | 33 | Ricky Carmichael | 1 |
| TC Motorsports | Chevrolet | 35 | Ricky Sanders | 1 |
| Ralph Solhem Racing | Chevrolet | 38 | Danny Sammons | 1 |
| Chip Ganassi Racing | Dodge | 40 | Dario Franchitti | 1 |
| Larry Clemons Racing | Ford | 41 | Josh Clemons | 2 |
| Baker Curb Racing | Ford | 47 | Brad Baker | 1 |
| Dick Greenfield Racing | Dodge | 49 | Billy Pauch Jr. | 2 |
| Bobby Jones Racing | Dodge | 50 | Greg Sacks | 1 |
| Phoenix Racing | Dodge | 51 | Eddie Mercer | 1 |
| Ken Schrader Racing | Dodge; Chevrolet | 52 | Bill Baird | 2 |
| Ken Schrader Racing | Dodge; Chevrolet | 52 | Ken Schrader | 5 |
| Bob Schacht Motorsports | Chevrolet; Ford | 54 | Benny Chastain | 1 |
| Bob Schacht Motorsports | Chevrolet; Ford | 75 | Brian Scott | 1 |
| Bob Schacht Motorsports | Chevrolet; Ford | 75 | Clay Rogers | 3 |
| Bob Schacht Motorsports | Chevrolet; Ford | 75 | Michael Simko | 3 |
| Bob Schacht Motorsports | Chevrolet; Ford | 75 | Bob Schacht | 1 |
| Stringer Motorsports | Chevrolet | 57 | Brent Sherman | 1 |
| McCreery Motorsports | Ford | 57 | Kyle Chady | 2 |
| Mark Gibson Racing | Chevrolet; Dodge | 59 | Ray Mooi | 1 |
| Mark Gibson Racing | Chevrolet; Dodge | 59 | Nick Tucker | 1 |
| Rusty Wallace, Inc. | Chevrolet | 61 | Chase Austin | 1 |
| Hollenbeck Racing | Chevrolet | 62 | Larry Hollenbeck | 6 |
| Rabenold Racing | Chevrolet | 63 | Kory Rabenold | 1 |
| Germain Racing | Toyota | 65 | Justin Marks | 1 |
| Germain Racing | Toyota | 65 | Chrissy Wallace | 1 |
| Hendren Motorsports | Chevrolet; Ford | 66 | Bryan Reffner | 3 |
| Hendren Motorsports | Chevrolet; Ford | 66 | Bob Strait | 2 |
| Hendren Motorsports | Chevrolet; Ford | 66 | Tony Ave | 1 |
| Bramley Racing | Chevrolet | 68 | Steve Bramley | 1 |
| Derrike Cope, Inc. | Dodge | 68 | Angela Cope | 1 |
| Derrike Cope, Inc. | Dodge | 68 | Jennifer Jo Cobb | 1 |
| Derrike Cope, Inc. | Dodge | 70 | Amber Cope | 2 |
| Blackburn Motorsports | Dodge | 69 | Steve Blackburn | 1 |
| Ted Olswfski Racing | Chevrolet | 71 | Ted Olswfski | 1 |
| TRG Motorsports | Chevrolet | 71 | Tim George Jr. | 2 |
| Bryan Racing | Dodge | 72 | Dawayne Bryan | 1 |
| Shearer Racing | Ford | 73 | Dale Shearer | 2 |
| Hansen Motorsports | Chevrolet | 77 | Todd Hansen | 6 |
| K&K Racing | Chevrolet | 79 | Mike Koch | 7 |
| Randy Baker Racing | Chevrolet | 81 | Randy Baker | 1 |
| Norm Benning Racing | Chevrolet | 81 | Scott Alves | 1 |
| LB Motorsports | Dodge | 85 | Lance Fenton | 1 |
| Stott Classic Racing | Chevrolet | 86 | Brian Conz | 1 |
| JR Motorsports | Chevrolet | 88 | Landon Cassill | 2 |
| MK Racing | Ford | 96 | Brandon Knupp | 1 |
| Littleton Motorsports | Chevrolet | 96 | Mark Littleton | 1 |
| Hoddick Racing | Dodge | 96 | Todd Hoddick | 1 |

== Schedule ==
| No. | Race title | Track | City | Date |
|---|---|---|---|---|
| 1 | ARCA 200 at Daytona | Daytona International Speedway | Daytona Beach, Florida | February 9 |
| 2 | Kentuckiana Ford Dealers 200 by Federated Auto Parts | Salem Speedway | Washington Township, Indiana | April 13 |
| 3 | Prairie Meadows 250 | Iowa Speedway | Newton, Iowa | April 19 |
| 4 | Kansas Lottery $150 Grand | Kansas Speedway | Kansas City, Kansas | April 26 |
| 5 | Carolina 500 | Rockingham Speedway | Rockingham, North Carolina | May 4 |
| 6 | Drive Smart! Buckle-Up Kentucky 150 | Kentucky Speedway | Sparta, Kentucky | May 10 |
| 7 | Hantz Group 200 by Federated Car Care | Toledo Speedway | Toledo, Ohio | May 18 |
| 8 | Pocono 200 | Pocono Raceway | Long Pond, Pennsylvania | June 7 |
| 9 | Racing For Wildlife 200 | Michigan International Speedway | Brooklyn, Michigan | June 13 |
| 10 | Cayuga ARCA Re/Max 250 | Cayuga International Speedway | Hamilton, Ontario, Canada | June 29 |
| 11 | Kentucky ARCA Re/Max 150 | Kentucky Speedway | Sparta, Kentucky | July 18 |
| 12 | Request Foods / GFS 200 | Berlin Raceway | Marne, Michigan | July 26 |
| 13 | Pennsylvania ARCA 200 | Pocono Raceway | Long Pond, Pennsylvania | August 2 |
| 14 | Toyota 150 | Nashville Superspeedway | Lebanon, Tennessee | August 9 |
| 15 | Allen Crowe 100 | Illinois State Fairgrounds Racetrack | Springfield, Illinois | August 17 |
| 16 | Southern Illinois 100 | DuQuoin State Fairgrounds Racetrack | Du Quoin, Illinois | September 1 |
| 17 | Chicagoland ARCA 200 | Chicagoland Speedway | Joliet, Illinois | September 6 |
| 18 | Eddie Gilstrap Motors 200 by Advance Auto Parts | Salem Speedway | Washington Township, Indiana | September 13 |
| 19 | Loud Energy Drink 150 | New Jersey Motorsports Park | Millville, New Jersey | September 28 |
| 20 | ARCA Re/Max 250 | Talladega Superspeedway | Lincoln, Alabama | October 3 |
| 21 | Hantz Group 200 by Belle Tire & Federated Car Care | Toledo Speedway | Toledo, Ohio | October 12 |

== Results ==
=== Races ===
| No. | Race | Pole Position | Most laps led | Winning driver | No. | Winning team | Winning manufacturer |
|---|---|---|---|---|---|---|---|
| 1 | ARCA 200 at Daytona | Justin Marks | Michael Annett | Michael Annett | 28 | Bill Davis Racing | Toyota |
| 2 | Kentuckiana Ford Dealers 200 by Federated Auto Parts | Ken Schrader | Ken Schrader | Justin Allgaier | 16 | Allgaier Motorsports | Chevrolet |
| 3 | Prairie Meadows 250 | Matt Carter | Matt Carter | Matt Hawkins | 39 | Matt Hawkins Racing | Dodge |
| 4 | Kansas Lottery $150 Grand | Ken Butler III | Michael Annett | Scott Speed | 2 | Eddie Sharp Racing | Toyota |
| 5 | Carolina 500 | Joey Logano | Joey Logano | Joey Logano | 25 | Venturini Motorsports | Chevrolet |
| 6 | Drive Smart! Buckle-Up Kentucky 150 | Sean Caisse | Scott Speed | Ricky Stenhouse Jr. | 99 | Roush-Fenway Racing | Ford |
| 7 | Hantz Group 200 by Federated Car Care | Andy Hanson | Matt Carter | Matt Carter | 46 | Clement Racing | Ford |
| 8 | Pocono 200 | Scott Speed | Ricky Stenhouse Jr. | Ricky Stenhouse Jr. | 99 | Roush-Fenway Racing | Ford |
| 9 | Racing For Wildlife 200 | Scott Speed | Sean Caisse | Justin Lofton | 20 | Eddie Sharp Racing | Dodge |
| 10 | Cayuga ARCA Re/Max 250 | Justin Lofton | Ricky Stenhouse Jr. | Justin Allgaier | 16 | Allgaier Motorsports | Chevrolet |
| 11 | Kentucky ARCA Re/Max 150 | Brian Scott | Scott Speed | Scott Speed | 2 | Eddie Sharp Racing | Toyota |
| 12 | Request Foods / GFS 200 | Justin Allgaier | Frank Kimmel | Scott Speed | 2 | Eddie Sharp Racing | Toyota |
| 13 | Pennsylvania ARCA 200 | Scott Speed | Scott Speed | Justin Allgaier | 16 | Allgaier Motorsports | Chevrolet |
| 14 | Toyota 150 | Ken Butler III | Sean Caisse | Scott Speed | 2 | Eddie Sharp Racing | Toyota |
| 15 | Allen Crowe 100 | Frank Kimmel | Frank Kimmel | Frank Kimmel | 44 | Kimmel Racing | Ford |
| 16 | Southern Illinois 100 | Ricky Stenhouse Jr. | Frank Kimmel | Frank Kimmel | 44 | Kimmel Racing | Ford |
| 17 | Chicagoland ARCA 200 | Ricky Stenhouse Jr. | Ricky Stenhouse Jr. | Scott Lagasse Jr. | 25 | Venturini Motorsports | Chevrolet |
| 18 | Eddie Gilstrap Motors 200 by Advance Auto Parts | Ricky Stenhouse Jr. | Sean Caisse | Frank Kimmel | 44 | Kimmel Racing | Ford |
| 19 | Loud Energy Drink 150 | Andy Lally | Andy Lally | Justin Allgaier | 16 | Allgaier Motorsports | Chevrolet |
| 20 | ARCA Re/Max 250 | James Buescher | Tom Hessert III | Justin Allgaier | 16 | Allgaier Motorsports | Chevrolet |
| 21 | Hantz Group 200 by Belle Tire & Federated Car Care | Justin Lofton | Justin Lofton | Justin Allgaier | 16 | Allgaier Motorsports | Dodge |

== Point Standings ==
| **No** | **Driver** | **Points** | **Wins** | **Top 5** | **Top 10** |
| 1st | Justin Allgaier | 5260 | 6 | 14 | 16 |
| 2nd | Frank Kimmel | 5210 | 3 | 11 | 14 |
| 3rd | Matt Carter | 5175 | 1 | 8 | 14 |
| 4th | Ricky Stenhouse Jr. | 5155 | 2 | 10 | 14 |
| 5th | Scott Speed | 5150 | 4 | 10 | 17 |
| 6th | Patrick Sheltra | 4580 | 0 | 4 | 9 |
| 7th | John Wes Townley | 4540 | 0 | 1 | 8 |
| 8th | Tom Hessert III | 4465 | 0 | 1 | 7 |
| 9th | Tayler Malsam | 4410 | 0 | 3 | 5 |
| 10th | Ken Butler III | 4365 | 0 | 1 | 7 |
| 11th | Dexter Bean | 4285 | 0 | 4 | 6 |
| 12th | Bryan Silas | 4230 | 0 | 0 | 7 |
| 13th | Justin Lofton | 3975 | 1 | 3 | 5 |
| 14th | Gabi DiCarlo | 3790 | 0 | 0 | 3 |
| 15th | Darrell Basham | 3565 | 0 | 0 | 0 |
| 16th | Michael Phelps | 3365 | 0 | 0 | 3 |
| 17th | Brad Smith | 3360 | 0 | 0 | 0 |
| 18th | Donny Kelley | 3320 | 0 | 0 | 0 |
| 19th | Norm Benning | 3260 | 0 | 0 | 1 |
| 20th | Mike Harmon | 3040 | 0 | 0 | 1 |

ARCARacing.com

=== Full Drivers' Championship ===
(key) Bold – Pole position awarded by time. Italics – Pole position set by final practice results or rainout. * – Most laps led.

| Pos | Driver | DAY | SLM | IOW | KAN | CAR | KEN | TOL | POC | MCH | CAY | KEN | BER | POC | NSH | ISF | DQN | CHI | SLM | NJE | TAL | TOL | Points |
|---|---|---|---|---|---|---|---|---|---|---|---|---|---|---|---|---|---|---|---|---|---|---|---|
| 1 | Justin Allgaier | 2 | 1 | 2 | 30 | 27 | 21 | 4 | 5 | 37 | 1 | 3 | **2** | 1 | 8 | 6 | 16 | 4 | 4 | 1 | 1 | 1 | 5260 |
| 2 | Frank Kimmel | 5 | 4 | 3 | 20 | 10 | 13 | 12 | 26 | 3 | 2 | 4 | 3* | 32 | 19 | **1*** | 1* | 11 | 1 | 10 | 6 | 3 | 5210 |
| 3 | Matt Carter | 13 | 3 | 4* | 11 | 8 | 29 | 1* | 12 | 12 | 6 | 7 | 5 | 4 | 9 | 4 | 6 | 12 | 2 | 30 | 10 | 2 | 5175 |
| 4 | Ricky Stenhouse Jr. | 25 | 6 | 19 | 2 | 3 | 1 | 7 | 1* | 2 | 3* | 13 | 7 | 30 | 7 | 2 | **5** | **2*** | **17** | 2 | 28 | 25 | 5155 |
| 5 | Scott Speed | 39 | 5 | 6 | 1 | 35 | 2* | 6 | **2** | **4** | 8 | 1* | 1 | **2*** | 1 | 8 | 8 | 3 | 8 | 8 | 23 | 34 | 5150 |
| 6 | Patrick Sheltra | 15 | 11 | 9 | 8 | 34 | 7 | 2 | 33 | 6 | 18 | 31 | 26 | 12 | 10 | 12 | 2 | 31 | 11 | 11 | 5 | 4 | 4580 |
| 7 | John Wes Townley | 11 | 7 | 12 | 15 | 12 | 5 | 16 | 20 | 13 | 9 | 34 | 8 | 9 | 33 | 15 | 11 | 40 | 7 | 18 | 7 | 6 | 4540 |
| 8 | Tom Hessert III | 6 | 15 | 11 | 13 | 9 | 14 | 10 | 30 | 23 | 7 | 12 | 9 | 36 | 11 | 7 | 15 | 30 | 22 | 19 | 27* | 5 | 4465 |
| 9 | Tayler Malsam | 18 | 31 | 10 | 14 | 14 | 11 | 13 | 3 | 18 | 11 | 19 | 12 | 22 | 13 | 5 | 13 | 39 | 20 | 3 | 37 | 8 | 4410 |
| 10 | Ken Butler III | 19 | 20 | 7 | **7** | 39 | 4 | 25 | 11 | 7 | 21 | 28 | 25 | 7 | **6** | 13 | 19 | 10 | 19 | 16 | 36 | 11 | 4365 |
| 11 | Dexter Bean | 22 | 22 | 35 | 19 | 11 | 22 | 3 | 7 | 9 | 4 | 23 | 16 | 33 | 18 | 32 | 4 | 27 | 3 | 14 | 24 | 21 | 4285 |
| 12 | Bryan Silas | 36 | 8 | 8 | 16 | 30 | 8 | 27 | 15 | 21 | 14 | 21 | 13 | 17 | 28 | 20 | 10 | 6 | 9 | 17 | 43 | 7 | 4230 |
| 13 | Justin Lofton | | 19 | 36 | 12 | 43 | 23 | 14 | 19 | 1 | **27** | 10 | 4 | 11 | 5 | 24 | 12 | 8 | 12 | 36 | 16 | **12*** | 3975 |
| 14 | Gabi DiCarlo | 20 | 25 | 26 | 9 | 25 | 25 | 33 | 10 | 15 | 23 | 17 | 29 | 10 | 40 | 25 | 22 | 17 | 13 | 12 | 33 | 29 | 3790 |
| 15 | Darrell Basham | 14 | 16 | 23 | 35 | 22 | 35 | 15 | 16 | 33 | 20 | 27 | 22 | 25 | 27 | 26 | 21 | 41 | 14 | 23 | 17 | 32 | 3565 |
| 16 | Michael Phelps | DNQ | 32 | 24 | 17 | 37 | 38 | 21 | 9 | 20 | 17 | 9 | 15 | 14 | 20 | 17 | 32 | 28 | 10 | 20 | 29 | | 3365 |
| 17 | Brad Smith | 29 | 18 | 25 | 38 | 32 | 27 | 23 | 22 | 30 | 15 | 25 | 23 | 28 | 26 | 23 | 33 | 23 | 16 | 28 | DNQ | 19 | 3360 |
| 18 | Donny Kelley | | 29 | 22 | 34 | 19 | 18 | 28 | 18 | 27 | 24 | 33 | 19 | 18 | 30 | 16 | 27 | 21 | 18 | 25 | 14 | 16 | 3320 |
| 19 | Norm Benning | 31 | 10 | 21 | 26 | 26 | 24 | 22 | 17 | 39 | 13 | 24 | 21 | 31 | 23 | 27 | 20 | 25 | | 33 | 18 | 17 | 3260 |
| 20 | Mike Harmon | 12 | 21 | 14 | 28 | 18 | 36 | DNQ | 27 | 34 | 10 | | 18 | 19 | 36 | 22 | 28 | 33 | 24 | 35 | 15 | DNQ | 3040 |
| 21 | Tim Mitchell | 21 | DNQ | 30 | 29 | 24 | 26 | 29 | 21 | 35 | 22 | 35 | 24 | 27 | 24 | 34 | DNQ | 34 | 30 | 39 | 19 | DNQ | 2950 |
| 22 | Bobby Gerhart | 4 | 23 | 15 | 21 | 41 | 16 | 17 | 4 | 17 | | 32 | | 23 | 22 | | | 13 | | | 3 | 23 | 2590 |
| 23 | Dominick Casola | 33 | 27 | 17 | 22 | 36 | 10 | | 8 | | | | 11 | 21 | | | | 20 | | | 35 | | 1580 |
| 24 | Alli Owens | 41 | | 27 | 18 | 15 | | | 24 | 24 | | 15 | | | 29 | | | 15 | | 27 | 41 | 22 | 1530 |
| 25 | Brian Scott | 40 | | | | | | | | 5 | | **5** | | 20 | 3 | | | | | 5 | 34 | 26 | 1430 |
| 26 | Robb Brent | DNQ | | 13 | 5 | | 31 | 32 | 6 | 11 | | 8 | | 5 | | | | | | | | | 1340 |
| 27 | James Hylton | DNQ | 34 | | 37 | 28 | | DNQ | 35 | 32 | 19 | | 28 | 35 | 35 | 35 | 35 | 38 | 27 | 26 | | | 1325 |
| 28 | Ken Schrader | | **2*** | | | 2 | | 9 | | | | | | | | | 3 | | | | | 24 | 1245 |
| 29 | Billy Leslie | | 30 | 18 | | 38 | 15 | 31 | | 31 | 26 | 36 | 6 | | 14 | | | 14 | | | | | 1210 |
| 30 | Jesse Smith | DNQ | | 5 | 3 | 44 | 30 | | 29 | 8 | | 11 | | | | | | 5 | | | | | 1205 |
| 31 | Jeremy Clements | DNQ | | | 6 | 33 | | | 31 | | | | | 6 | 2 | | | 9 | | | 4 | | 1185 |
| 32 | Terry Jones | 35 | 9 | | | | | 24 | | 25 | 12 | | | | | | | | 25 | | 21 | 31 | 1180 |
| 33 | Wayne Peterson | | DNQ | DNQ | DNQ | 50 | 40 | DNQ | 38 | DNQ | 33 | DNQ | 30 | DNQ | 41 | DNQ | 36 | Wth | DNQ | | | | 1050 |
| 34 | Matt Hawkins | | | 1 | | 4 | | | | 29 | | 6 | | | 4 | | | | | | | | 940 |
| 35 | Michael Annett | 1* | | 28 | 4 | 5 | 9 | | | | | | | | | | | | | | | | 925 |
| 36 | James Buescher | | | 29 | | | | | | | 25 | | | | 17 | | 9 | 36 | | 7 | **31** | | 880 |
| 37 | Sean Caisse | | | | | | **28** | | | 19* | | 2 | | | 16* | | | | 5* | | | | 875 |
| 38 | Ryan Fischer | 43 | | | 10 | | 3 | 26 | | 26 | 16 | 26 | | | | | | | | | | | 875 |
| 39 | Todd Bowsher | | | 32 | | | 32 | | | | | | 10 | | | | | | | 37 | | 10 | 795 |
| 40 | Jake Francis | DNQ | 24 | 20 | 33 | | 19 | | | | | | | | | | | | | | | DNQ | 745 |
| 41 | A. J. Henriksen | | | | | 48 | | | | 10 | | | | 13 | | 18 | 30 | 32 | | | 38 | | 705 |
| 42 | Tom Berte | | | 33 | 23 | | 20 | | 37 | | | 30 | | 24 | | | | | | 15 | | | 700 |
| 43 | Brett Hudson | | 26 | | | | 6 | | | | | 18 | | | | | | 37 | 6 | | | | 690 |
| 44 | Greg Seevers | | | | | | 41 | DNQ | | 40 | | DNQ | 31 | | 39 | 36 | 39 | DNQ | 29 | | | DNQ | 690 |
| 45 | Mike Koch | DNQ | 35 | 37 | 31 | 23 | 34 | 34 | | | | | | | | | | | | | | | 685 |
| 46 | Kory Rabenold | DNQ | 28 | | | 20 | | | 25 | | | | | 38 | | | | | 15 | 21 | | | 670 |
| 47 | Parker Kligerman | | | | | | | | | | | | | | | | | | | 6 | | 9 | 645 |
| 48 | Michael Simko | | | | | | | 11 | | 22 | | | | | | | | | | | | 27 | 645 |
| 49 | Jason Basham | | DNQ | DNQ | | 47 | 37 | 18 | | | 28 | | | 37 | 38 | | | 35 | DNQ | 22 | | | 615 |
| 50 | Chase Mattioli | | 12 | | | | | 20 | 32 | | | | | 16 | | | | | | 29 | | | 610 |
| 51 | David Ragan | | | | | | | 5 | | | | | | | | | | | | | | 15 | 590 |
| 52 | Todd Hoddick | | | | | | | | | | | | 14 | | | | | | | | | 13 | 575 |
| 53 | Larry Hollenbeck | DNQ | | | | | | | | 28 | | | 20 | | | | | DNQ | | | 42 | DNQ | 575 |
| 54 | Andy Hanson | | | | | | | **8** | | | | | | | | | | | | | | 28 | 550 |
| 55 | Todd Hansen | | | 31 | 40 | | 12 | | | 36 | | DNQ | | | | | | 18 | | | | | 485 |
| 56 | Joey Logano | | | | | **1*** | | | | | | | | | | | | | | | 2 | | 475 |
| 57 | Bryan Reffner | | | | | | | | | 14 | | 14 | | | | | | 16 | | | | | 470 |
| 58 | Grant Enfinger | | | 39 | 36 | | 39 | | | | | | | | | | | | DNQ | | | 33 | 460 |
| 59 | Ron Cox | | 17 | | 25 | | 33 | | | | | | | | | 29 | 38 | | | | | | 455 |
| 60 | Luke Hall | | | | | | | | | | | 22 | | | | | | | | | | 30 | 450 |
| 61 | Frank Kapfhammer | | | | 32 | | 17 | | | | | 20 | | | 25 | | | | | | | | 450 |
| 62 | Phil Bozell | | | | | | | | | DNQ | | | | | | | | | | | | 14 | 435 |
| 63 | Nur Ali | 23 | | | | | | | | | | | | | | | | | | | | 35 | 420 |
| 64 | Ben Stancill | | | | | | | | | | | | | | 37 | | | 7 | | | 12 | | 410 |
| 65 | Matt Kurzejewski | | | | | | | | | | | | | | | | | | | | | 18 | 390 |
| 66 | Brandon Thompson | | | | | | | | | | | | | | | | | | | | | 20 | 385 |
| 67 | Kelly Kovski | | | | | | | | | | | | | | | 9 | 7 | | | | | | 380 |
| 68 | Curt Tori | | | | | | | 30 | | | | DNQ | | | | | | | | | | DNQ | 380 |
| 69 | Pierre Bourque | 24 | | 16 | 24 | Wth | Wth | | | | | | | | | | | | | | | | 370 |
| 70 | Clay Rogers | | | | | 13 | | | | | | | | | 34 | | | 22 | | | | | 345 |
| 71 | Doug Keller | | | | | | | | | | | | | | | 10 | 17 | | | | | | 330 |
| 72 | Mark Dimitroff | | Wth | | | | | 35 | | | | | | | | | | | | | | DNQ | 330 |
| 73 | Billy Pauch Jr. | | | | | | | | 13 | | | | | 15 | | | | | | | | | 320 |
| 74 | Max Dumarey | 37 | | | 27 | | | | | | | | | | | | | | | | 11 | | 315 |
| 75 | Brian Tyler | DNQ | | | | | | | | | | | | | | 3 | 31 | | | | | QL | 315 |
| 76 | Charlie Vest | | | | | | | | | | 29 | | | | | 14 | 34 | | | | | | 305 |
| 77 | Michel Disdier | | 13 | | | | | 19 | | | | | | | | | | | | | | | 300 |
| 78 | J. R. Heffner | 16 | | | | | | | | | | 16 | | | | | | | | | | | 300 |
| 79 | Dale Shearer | | | | | | | | | | | | | | | 28 | 29 | | 28 | | | | 265 |
| 80 | Justin Marks | **26** | | | | 31 | | | | | | | | | | | | | | | 32 | | 265 |
| 81 | Jeff Buice | | | | | 17 | | | | | | | | | | | | | | 24 | | | 255 |
| 82 | Lance Stott | | | | | | | | | | | | | | | 21 | 23 | | | | | | 240 |
| 83 | Scott Lagasse Jr. | | | | | | | | | | | | | | | | | 1 | | | | | 240 |
| 84 | Andy Lally | | | | | | | | | | | | | | | | | | | **4*** | | | 235 |
| 85 | Landon Cassill | 7 | | | | | | | | | | | | | | | | | | | 39 | | 230 |
| 86 | Brian Kaltreider | | | | | | | | 14 | 38 | | | | DNQ | | | | | | | | | 225 |
| 87 | Marc Davis | | | | | | | | | | | | | 8 | | | | | | | 40 | | 220 |
| 88 | Chrissy Wallace | | | | | | | | | | | | | 39 | | | | | | | 9 | | 220 |
| 89 | Bill Baird | 3 | | | | | | | | | | | | | | | | | | | 26 | | 215 |
| 90 | Chase Miller | | | | | | | | | | | | | 3 | | | | | | | | | 215 |
| 91 | Jack Bailey | 30 | | | | 21 | | | | | | | | | | | | | | | | | 205 |
| 92 | Tim George Jr. | | | | | | | | | | | | | | 31 | | | | | | 20 | | 205 |
| 93 | Peter Shepherd III | | | | | | | | | | 5 | | | | | | | | | | | | 205 |
| 94 | Brandon Knupp | | | | | 49 | | | | | | | | | 12 | | | | | | | | 200 |
| 95 | Chad McCumbee | | | | | 6 | | | | | | | | | | | | | | | | | 200 |
| 96 | Austin Dillon | | | | | 7 | | | | | | | | | | | | | | | | | 195 |
| 97 | Josh Clemons | | 33 | | | | | | | | | | | | | | | | 21 | | | | 190 |
| 98 | Dawayne Bryan | 8 | | | | | | | | | | | | | | | | | | | | | 190 |
| 99 | Mark Thompson | | | | | | | | | | | | | | | | | | | | 8 | | 190 |
| 100 | Brad Baker | 9 | | | | | | | | | | | | | | | | | | | | | 185 |
| 101 | Bob Schacht | | | | | | | | | | | | | | | | | | | 9 | | | 185 |
| 102 | A. J. Fike | | | | | | | | | | | | | | | 30 | 26 | | | | | | 180 |
| 103 | Bob Strait | | | | | | | | | | | | | | | 31 | 25 | | | | | | 180 |
| 104 | Dario Franchitti | 10 | | | | | | | | | | | | | | | | | | | | | 180 |
| 105 | Kyle Chady | | | | | | | | | | | | | | | 33 | 24 | | | | | | 175 |
| 106 | Bradley Riethmeyer | | | | | | | | | | | | | | | 11 | | | | | | | 175 |
| 107 | Lee Arnold | | | | | | | | | | | | | | | | | | | 13 | | | 165 |
| 108 | Eddie Mercer | | | | | | | | | | | | | | | | | | | | 13 | | 165 |
| 109 | Brent Glastetter | | | | | | | | | | | | | | | | 14 | | | | | | 160 |
| 110 | Ryan Hackett | | 14 | | | | | | | | | | | | | | | | | | | | 160 |
| 111 | Mark Littleton | | | | | | | | | | | | | | | 19 | 40 | | | | | | 160 |
| 112 | Billy Wease | | | | | | | | | | | | | | 15 | | | | | | | | 155 |
| 113 | Nick Tucker | | | | | 16 | | | | | | | | | | | | | | | | | 150 |
| 114 | Chris Wimmer | | | | | | | | | 16 | | | | | | | | | | | | | 150 |
| 115 | Ted Olswfski | | | | | 29 | | | 34 | | | | | | | | | | | | | | 145 |
| 116 | John Graham | | | | | | | | 23 | 41 | | | | | | | | | | | | | 145 |
| 117 | Daniel Bopp | | | | | | | | | | | | 17 | | | | | | | | | | 145 |
| 118 | Brandon Kelley | 17 | | | | | | | | | | | | | | | | | | | | | 145 |
| 119 | Steve Blackburn | DNQ | | | | | | | | | | | | | | | | | | | 22 | | 145 |
| 120 | Chris Cockrum | DNQ | | | | | | | | | | 37 | | | 32 | | | | | | | | 140 |
| 121 | Eddie Pearson | | | | | | | | | | | | | | | | 18 | | | | | | 140 |
| 122 | Jennifer Jo Cobb | | | | | | | | | | | | | | | | | 19 | | | | | 135 |
| 123 | Matt Merrell | | | | | | | | | | | 40 | | | | | | | 26 | | | | 130 |
| 124 | Amber Cope | | | | | | | | | | | 38 | | | | | | 29 | | | | | 125 |
| 125 | Chad Blount | | | | | | | | | | | | | | 21 | | | | | | | | 125 |
| 126 | Jeff Caudell | | | | | | | | | | | | | | | | | | 23 | | | | 115 |
| 127 | Lance Fenton | | | | | | | | | | | | | | | | | 24 | | | | | 110 |
| 128 | John Jackson | | | | | | | | | | | | | | | | | | | | 25 | | 110 |
| 129 | Mike Zazula | | | | | | | | 36 | | | | | 41 | | | | | | DNQ | | | 105 |
| 130 | Bill Conger | | | | | | | | | | | | | | | | | 26 | | | | | 100 |
| 131 | Ed Pompa | | | | | | | | | | | | | 26 | | | | | | | | | 100 |
| 132 | Benny Chastain | 27 | | | | | | | | | | | | | | | | | | | | | 95 |
| 133 | Corey LaCosta | | | | | | | | | | | | 27 | | | | | | | | | | 95 |
| 134 | Steve Fox | | | | | | | | 28 | | | | | | | | | | | | | | 90 |
| 135 | Danny Sammons | 28 | | | | | | | | | | | | | | | | | | | | | 90 |
| 136 | Angela Cope | | | | | | | | | | | 29 | | | | | | | | | | | 85 |
| 137 | Jarit Johnson | | | | | | | | | | | | | 29 | | | | | | | | | 85 |
| 138 | Troy Wangerin | DNQ | | 34 | | | | | | | | | | | | | | | | | | | 85 |
| 139 | Ricky Carmichael | | | | | | | | | | | | | | | | | | | | 30 | | 80 |
| 140 | Dave Savicki | | | | | | | | | | 30 | | | | | | | | | | | | 80 |
| 141 | Tony Ave | | | | | | | | | | | | | | | | | | | 31 | | | 75 |
| 142 | Will Kimmel | | | | | | | | | | 31 | | | | | | | | | | | | 75 |
| 143 | Ed Bull | | | | | | | | | | | | | | | | | | | 32 | | | 70 |
| 144 | Mario Gosselin | 32 | | | | | | | | | | | | | | | | | | | | | 70 |
| 145 | Brad Yunker | | | | | | | | | | 32 | | | | | | | | | | | | 70 |
| 146 | Aric Almirola | | | | | | | | | | | | | 34 | | | | | | | | | 70 |
| 147 | A. J. Genail | | | 41 | 39 | | | | | | | | | | | | | | | | | | 65 |
| 148 | Jeremy Petty | | | 38 | DNQ | | | | | | | | | | | | | | | | | | 65 |
| 149 | Willie Mullins | | | | | | | | | | | | | | | | | | | 34 | | | 60 |
| 150 | Kirk Shelmerdine | 34 | | | | | | | | | | | | | | | | | | | | | 60 |
| 151 | Brent Cross | DNQ | | | | | | | | | | | | 40 | | | | | | | | | 55 |
| 152 | Justin Koch | | | | | | | | | | | | | | | | 37 | | | | | | 45 |
| 153 | Tom Graham | | | | | | | | | | | | | | | | | | | 38 | | | 40 |
| 154 | Kyle Krisiloff | 38 | | | | | | | | | | | | | | | | | | | | | 40 |
| 155 | Jim Walker | | | | | | | | | | | 39 | | | | | | | | | | | 35 |
| 156 | Jeff Boyer | | | | | 40 | | | | | | | | | | | | | | | | | 30 |
| 157 | Barry Layne | | | 40 | | | | | | | | | | | | | | | | | | | 30 |
| 158 | Randy Baker | | | | | | | | | | | 41 | | | | | | | | | | | 30 |
| 159 | Mike Holt | | | | | 42 | | | | | | | | | | | | | | | | | 30 |
| 160 | Ed Kennedy | 42 | | | | | | | | | | | | | | | | | | | | | 30 |
| 161 | Ricky Sanders | | | | | 45 | | | | | | | | | | | | | | | | | 30 |
| 162 | Brent Sherman | | | | | 46 | | | | DNQ | | | | | | | | | | | | | 30 |
| 163 | Blake Feese | DNQ | | | | | | | | | | | | | | | | | | | | | |
| 164 | Chase Austin | DNQ | | | | | | | | | | | | | | | | | | | | | |
| 165 | Brian Conz | DNQ | | | | | | | | | | | | | | | | | | | | | |
| 166 | Ray Mooi | DNQ | | | | | | | | | | | | | | | | | | | | | |
| 167 | Greg Sacks | DNQ | | | | | | | | | | | | | | | | | | | | | |
| 168 | Andrew Ranger | DNQ | | | | | | | | | | | | | | | | | | | | | |
| 169 | Butch Jarvis | DNQ | | | | | | | | | | | | | | | | | | | | | |
| 170 | Steve Bramley | DNQ | | | | | | | | | | | | | | | | | | | | | |
| 171 | Scott Alves | | | | | DNQ | | | | | | | | | | | | | | | | | |
| 172 | Jimmy Nowell Jr. | | | | | | | | | | | DNQ | | | | | | | | | | | |
| 173 | Sean Corr | | | | | | | | | | | | | DNQ | | | | | | | | | |
| 174 | John Ferrier | | | | | | | | | | | | | DNQ | | | | | | | | | |
| 175 | Dicky Williamson | | | | | | | | | | | | | | | | | | | | DNQ | | |
| 176 | Marcus Fux | | | | | | | | | | | | | | | | | | | | | DNQ | |
| 177 | Michelle Theriault | | Wth | | | | | | | | | | | | | | | | | | | | |
| 178 | Greg Barnhart | | | | Wth | | | | | | | | | | | | | | | | | | |
| 179 | Art Seeger | | | | | | | | Wth | | | | | | | | | | | | | | |
| 180 | Kevin Trevellin | | | | | | | | | | QL | | | | | | | | | | | | |
| 181 | Ryan Seaman | | | | | | | | | | | | | | | | | | | QL | | | |
| 182 | Colin Braun | | | | | | | | | | | | | | | | | | | QL | | | |
| 183 | Brian Keselowski | | | | | | | | | | | | | | | | | | | | | QL | |
| Pos | Driver | DAY | SLM | IOW | KAN | CAR | KEN | TOL | POC | MCH | CAY | KEN | BER | POC | NSH | ISF | DQN | CHI | SLM | NJE | TAL | TOL | Points |

== See also ==
- 2008 NASCAR Sprint Cup Series
- 2008 NASCAR Nationwide Series
- 2008 NASCAR Craftsman Truck Series
- 2008 NASCAR Camping World East Series
- 2008 NASCAR Camping World West Series
- 2008 NASCAR Whelen Modified Tour
- 2008 NASCAR Whelen Southern Modified Tour
- 2008 NASCAR Canadian Tire Series
- 2008 NASCAR Corona Series
