= Mark Dimitroff =

American racing driver

- Born: January 14, 1954 (age 72); Flat Rock, Michigan, U.S.

ARCA Menards Series career
- 3 races run over 2 years
- Best finish: 72nd (2008)
- First race: 2007 Kentuckiana Ford Dealers ARCA 200 (Salem)
- Last race: 2008 Hantz Group 200 (Toledo)
Wins	Top tens	Poles
0	0	0
- Statistics up to date as of January 27, 2025.

Mark Dimitroff (born January 14, 1954) is an American former professional stock car racing driver who has previously competed in the ARCA Racing Series from 2007 to 2008.

Mooi has also competed in the ARCA Late Model Gold Cup Series.

== Motorsports results ==
=== ARCA Re/Max Series ===
(key) (Bold – Pole position awarded by qualifying time. Italics – Pole position earned by points standings or practice time. * – Most laps led.)

ARCA Re/Max Series results
Year	Team	No.	Make	1	2	3	4	5	6	7	8	9	10	11	12	13	14	15	16	17	18	19	20	21	22	23	ARSC	Pts	Ref
2007	Mark Dimitroff	20	Chevy	DAY	USA	NSH	SLM; DNQ	KAN	WIN; 17	KEN	TOL; 24	IOW	POC	MCH; DNQ	BLN	KEN	POC	NSH	ISF	MIL	GTW	DSF	CHI	SLM	TAL	TOL; DNQ	78th	330	
2008	Mark Dimitroff	20	Chevy	DAY	SLM; Wth	IOW	KAN	CAR	KEN																		72nd	330	
2008	Hixson Motorsports	29	Chevy							TOL; 35	POC	MCH	CAY	KEN	BLN	POC	NSH	ISF	DSF	CHI	SLM	NJE	TAL				72nd	330	
2008	Bobby Gerhart Racing	7	Chevy																					TOL; DNQ			72nd	330	
