= Michael Phelps (racing driver) =

American racing driver

- Born: July 17, 1988 (age 38); Suwanee, Georgia, U.S.

ARCA Menards Series career
- 21 races run over 3 years
- Best finish: 16th (2008)
- First race: 2007 Hantz Group 200 (Toledo)
- Last race: 2009 Lucas Oil Slick Mist 200 (Daytona)
Wins	Top tens	Poles
0	3	0
- Statistics up to date as of July 9, 2023.

Michael Phelps (born July 17, 1988) is an American professional stock car racing driver who has previously competed in the ARCA Re/Max Series.

== Racing career ==
In 2007, Phelps would make his ARCA Re/Max Series debut at the season ending race at Toledo Speedway, driving the No. 12 Chevrolet for DGM Racing, where he would start 26th and finish twentieth. He would attempt to qualify the season opening race at Daytona International Speedway in 2008, driving his self owned No. 13 Chevrolet, where he would ultimately fail to qualify. He would then go on to drive the No. 45 Dodge for Cunningham Motorsports in collaboration with Mark Gibson Racing, where he would remain for the rest of the year bar the season ending race at Toledo, where he would be replaced by Nur Ali. He would place sixteenth in the final points standings with three top-ten finishes with a best result of ninth at Pocono Raceway and Kentucky Speedway. Phelps would make one more start in the series in 2009, where he would once again attempt to qualify for Daytona with his own team, this time in the No. 39 Chevrolet in collaboration with Roulo Brothers Racing, where he would qualify in 31st, but finish 22nd due to being involved in a crash midway through the race. He has not competed in the series since then.

Phelps has most recently competed in the DIRTcar Sportsman Starter Series.

== Motorsports results ==
=== ARCA Re/Max Series ===
(key) (Bold – Pole position awarded by qualifying time. Italics – Pole position earned by points standings or practice time. * – Most laps led.)

ARCA Re/Max Series results
Year	Team	No.	Make	1	2	3	4	5	6	7	8	9	10	11	12	13	14	15	16	17	18	19	20	21	22	23	ARMC	Pts	Ref
2007	DGM Racing	12	Chevy	DAY	USA	NSH	SLM	KAN	WIN	KEN	TOL	IOW	POC	MCH	BLN	KEN	POC	NSH	ISF	MIL	GTW	DSF	CHI	SLM	TAL	TOL; 20	137th	130	
2008	DMT Motorsports	13	Chevy	DAY; DNQ																							16th	3365	
2008	Cunningham Motorsports	45	Dodge		SLM; 32	IOW; 24	KEN; 17	CAR; 37	KEN; 38	TOL; 21	POC; 9	MCH; 20	CAY; 17	KEN; 9	BLN; 15	POC; 14	NSH; 20	ISF; 17	DSF; 32	CHI; 28	SLM; 10	NJE; 20	TAL; 29	TOL			16th	3365	
2009	Michael Phelps Racing	39	Chevy	DAY; 22	SLM	CAR	TAL	KEN	TOL	POC	MCH	MFD	IOW	KEN	BLN	POC	ISF	CHI	TOL	DSF	NJE	SLM	KAN	CAR			132nd	120	
