= Josh Clemons =

American racing driver

- Born: March 13, 1976 (age 50); New Albany, Indiana, U.S.

ARCA Menards Series career
- 14 races run over 6 years
- Best finish: 57th (2004)
- First race: 2004 PFG Lester 150 (Nashville)
- Last race: 2011 Kentuckiana Ford Dealers ARCA Fall Classic (Salem)
Wins	Top tens	Poles
0	2	0
- Statistics up to date as of December 3, 2024.

Josh Clemons (born March 13, 1976) is an American former professional stock car racing driver who has competed in the ARCA Re/Max Series from 2004 to 2011.

Clemons has also competed in series such as the NASCAR Southeast Series, the ASA CRA Super Series, the NAMARS Kenyon MidgetCar Series, the USAC Indiana Ford Focus Midget Car Series, and the USAC Speedrome Ford Focus Midget Car Series.

== Motorsports results ==
=== ARCA Racing Series ===
(key) (Bold – Pole position awarded by qualifying time. Italics – Pole position earned by points standings or practice time. * – Most laps led. ** – All laps led.)

ARCA Re/Max Series results
Year	Team	No.	Make	1	2	3	4	5	6	7	8	9	10	11	12	13	14	15	16	17	18	19	20	21	22	23	ARSC	Pts	Ref
2004	Larry Clemons Racing	41	Ford	DAY	NSH; 9	SLM	KEN; 28	TOL	CLT	KAN	POC	MCH	SBO	BLN	KEN	GTW	POC	LER	NSH	ISF	TOL	DSF	CHI	SLM; 5	TAL		57th	510	
2005	Larry Clemons Racing	41	Ford	DAY	NSH; 11	SLM; 28	KEN	TOL	LAN	MIL	POC	MCH	KAN	KEN; 19	BLN	POC	GTW	LER	NSH	MCH	ISF	TOL	DSF	CHI	SLM; 21	TAL	61st	530	
2006	Larry Clemons Racing	41	Ford	DAY	NSH	SLM	WIN	KEN	TOL	POC	MCH	KAN	KEN	BLN	POC	GTW	NSH	MCH	ISF	MIL	TOL	DSF	CHI	SLM; 30	TAL	IOW	152nd	80	
2007	Larry Clemons Racing	41	Ford	DAY; DNQ	USA	NSH	SLM; 31	KAN	WIN	KEN	TOL	IOW	POC	MCH	BLN	KEN; DNQ	POC							SLM; 13	TAL	TOL; 18	58th	455	
2007	Larry Clemons Racing	21	Ford															NSH; DNQ	ISF	MIL	GTW	DSF	CHI				58th	455	
2008	Larry Clemons Racing	41	Ford	DAY	SLM; 33	IOW	KAN	CAR	KEN	TOL	POC	MCH	CAY	KEN	BLN	POC	NSH	ISF	DSF	CHI	SLM; 21	NJE	TAL	TOL			97th	190	
2011	Josh Clemons	47	Ford	DAY	TAL	SLM	TOL	NJE	CHI	POC	MCH	WIN	BLN	IOW	IRP	POC	ISF	MAD	DSF	SLM; 12	KAN	TOL					102nd	170	
