= Jeff Caudell =

American racing driver (born 1961)

- Born: May 15, 1961 (age 65); Austin, Indiana, U.S.

ARCA Menards Series career
- 36 races run over 9 years
- Best finish: 33rd (2002)
- First race: 2000 Eddie Gilstrap Motors Fall Classic 200 (Salem)
- Last race: 2008 Eddie Gilstrap Motors 200 by Advance Auto Parts (Salem)
Wins	Top tens	Poles
0	0	0
- Statistics up to date as of November 29, 2024.

Jeff Caudell (born May 15, 1961) is an American former professional stock car racing driver who has competed in the ARCA Re/Max Series from 2000 to 2008.

Caudell has also previously competed in the CRA Street Stocks Series and the Frank Kimmel Street Stock Nationals.

== Motorsports results ==
=== ARCA Re/Max Series ===
(key) (Bold – Pole position awarded by qualifying time. Italics – Pole position earned by points standings or practice time. * – Most laps led. ** – All laps led.)

ARCA Re/Max Series results
Year	Team	No.	Make	1	2	3	4	5	6	7	8	9	10	11	12	13	14	15	16	17	18	19	20	21	22	23	24	25	ARMSC	Pts	Ref
2000	N/A	3	Chevy	DAY	SLM	AND	CLT	KIL	FRS	MCH	POC	TOL	KEN	BLN	POC	WIN	ISF	KEN	DSF	SLM; 31	CLT	TAL	ATL						134th	75	
2001	Jeff Caudell	14	Chevy	DAY	NSH	WIN	SLM	GTY	KEN; 23	CLT	KAN	MCH	POC	MEM	GLN	KEN; 13	MCH	POC	NSH; 22	ISF	CHI; DNQ	DSF							70th	495	
2001	Clement Racing	25	Ford																				SLM; 32	TOL	BLN	CLT	TAL	ATL	70th	495	
2002	Jeff Caudell	5	Chevy	DAY	ATL	NSH; 19																CHI; 26							33rd	885	
2002	Jeff Caudell	4	Chevy				SLM; 11	KEN; 40	CLT	KAN	POC	MCH	TOL; DNQ	SBO															33rd	885	
2002	Jeff Caudell	14	Chevy												KEN; 23	BLN	POC	NSH; 15	ISF	WIN	DSF		SLM; 16	TAL	CLT				33rd	885	
2003	Bobby Gerhart Racing	7	Chevy	DAY	ATL	NSH	SLM; 25	TOL	KEN	CLT	BLN	KAN	MCH	LER	POC; 18	POC; 20	NSH	ISF	WIN	DSF; 29	CHI								37th	735	
2003	Jeff Caudell	14	Chevy																			SLM; 25	TAL	CLT					37th	735	
2003	Cunningham Motorsports	4	Chevy																						SBO; 17				37th	735	
2004	Bobby Gerhart Racing	7	Chevy	DAY	NSH; 34		KEN; 15	TOL	CLT	KAN	POC; 33	MCH	SBO	BLN	KEN	GTW; 16	POC	LER	NSH	ISF	TOL	DSF	CHI	SLM; 13	TAL				40th	715	
2004	Jeff Caudell	7	Chevy			SLM; 22																							40th	715	
2005	Bobby Gerhart Racing	7	Chevy	DAY	NSH	SLM; 21			LAN; 21	MIL	POC	MCH	KAN		BLN; 33	POC	GTW	LER	NSH	MCH	ISF	TOL	DSF	CHI	SLM; 14	TAL			56th	580	
2005	Jeff Caudell	5	Chevy				KEN; 30	TOL																					56th	580	
2005	Wayne Peterson Racing	6	Chevy											KEN; DNQ															56th	580	
2006	Jeff Caudell	7	Pontiac	DAY	NSH	SLM; DNQ																		SLM; 16	TAL	IOW			61st	570	
2006	Jeff Caudell	39	Pontiac				WIN; 16	KEN	TOL	POC	MCH	KAN	KEN	BLN; 16	POC	GTW	NSH	MCH	ISF										61st	570	
2006	Jeff Caudell	7	Chevy																	MIL; 27	TOL	DSF	CHI						61st	570	
2007	Jeff Caudell	7	Pontiac	DAY	USA	NSH	SLM; 17	KAN	WIN	KEN	TOL	IOW	POC	MCH	BLN	KEN	POC	NSH	ISF	MIL	GTW	DSF	CHI						81st	315	
2007	Bobby Gerhart Racing	7	Chevy																					SLM; 12	TAL	TOL			81st	315	
2008	Jeff Caudell	7	Chevy	DAY	SLM	IOW	KAN	CAR	KEN	TOL	POC	MCH	CAY	KEN	BLN	POC	NSH	ISF	DSF	CHI	SLM; 23	NJE	TAL	TOL					126th	115	
