= Frank Kapfhammer =

American racing driver

- Born: April 13, 1971 (age 55); Louisville, Kentucky, U.S.

ARCA Menards Series career
- 29 races run over 7 years
- Best finish: 46th (2006)
- First race: 2002 WLWT Channel 5 155 (Kentucky)
- Last race: 2008 Toyota 150 (Nashville)
Wins	Top tens	Poles
0	0	0
- Statistics up to date as of June 13, 2024.

Francis Kapfhammer Jr. (born April 13, 1971) is an American former professional stock car racing driver who has previously competed in the ARCA Re/Max Series.

== Racing career ==
In 2002, Kapfhammer made his ARCA Re/Max Series debut at Kentucky Speedway, driving the No. 54 Chevrolet for his own team, K&M Motorsports, where he 27th and finished fourteen laps down in 29th place. He then made three more starts throughout the year, getting a best finish of sixteenth at Nashville Superspeedway. He then attempted only two races the following year, failing to qualify at Nashville, and finishing 32nd at Salem Speedway due to a crash after starting eleventh. Afterwards, Kapfhammer attempted six more races in 2004, getting a best finish of nineteenth at the second Kentucky event.

In 2005, Kapfhammer attempted seven races, failing to qualify for three of those events, and getting a best finish of sixteenth in his first start of the year at Nashville. He then competed in seven races the following year, running his first two in the No. 94 Chevrolet, and running the remaining races in the No. 7, and earned a best finish of fourteenth at the second Nashville event.

In 2007, Kapfhammer entered in six races, this time solely driving the No. 7, where he failed to qualify for two of those races, and got a best finish of eighteenth at the second Nashville race. He then ran four races the following year, where he earned a best finish of sixteenth at the first Kentucky event. It was also during this year where he made a start in the CRA Street Stocks Series at Winchester Speedway, where he finished twelfth. Kapfhammer then competed in the Frank Kimmel Street Stock Nationals event at Rockingham Speedway, where he finished 55th. He has not competed in any racing series since then.

== Personal life ==
Kapfhammer's father, Francis Kapfhammer, was the first franchisee of Long John Silver's, a restaurant chain that sponsored the younger Kapfhammer in his racing endeavors. He currently serves as a board member and the treasurer for the Long John Silver's Franchisee Association.

== Motorsports results ==
=== ARCA Re/Max Series ===
(key) (Bold – Pole position awarded by qualifying time. Italics – Pole position earned by points standings or practice time. * – Most laps led. ** – All laps led.)

ARCA Re/Max Series results
Year	Team	No.	Make	1	2	3	4	5	6	7	8	9	10	11	12	13	14	15	16	17	18	19	20	21	22	23	ARMC	Pts	Ref
2002	K&M Motorsports	54	Chevy	DAY	ATL	NSH	SLM	KEN; 29	CLT	KAN	POC	MCH	TOL	SBO	KEN; 25	BLN	POC	NSH; 16	ISF	WIN	DSF	CHI	SLM; 20	TAL	CLT		60th	495	
2003	K&M Motorsports	54	Chevy	DAY	ATL	NSH; DNQ	SLM; 32	TOL	KEN	CLT	BLN	KAN	MCH	LER	POC	POC	NSH	ISF	WIN	DSF	CHI	SLM	TAL	CLT	SBO		166th	95	
2004	K&M Motorsports	54	Chevy	DAY	NSH; 29	SLM; 28	KEN; 21	TOL	CLT	KAN	POC	MCH	SBO	BLN	KEN; 19	GTW	POC	LER	NSH	ISF	TOL	DSF	CHI; 21	SLM; DNQ	TAL		51st	585	
2005	K&M Motorsports	54	Chevy	DAY	NSH; 16		KEN; 34	TOL	LAN	MIL	POC	MCH	KAN														62nd	525	
2005	K&M Motorsports	54	Pontiac			SLM; DNQ								KEN; DNQ	BLN	POC	GTW; DNQ	LER									62nd	525	
2005	K&M Motorsports	2	Pontiac																NSH; 20	MCH	ISF	TOL	DSF	CHI			62nd	525	
2005	K&M Motorsports	2	Chevy																						SLM; 24	TAL	62nd	525	
2006	K&M Motorsports	94	Chevy	DAY	NSH; 27	SLM	WIN	KEN; 27	TOL	POC	MCH																46th	810	
2006	K&M Motorsports	7	Chevy									KAN; 16	KEN; 15	BLN	POC		NSH; 14	MCH	ISF	MIL	TOL	DSF	CHI; 30	SLM	TAL	IOW	46th	810	
2006	K&M Motorsports	7	Pontiac													GTW; 31											46th	810	
2007	K&M Motorsports	7	Pontiac	DAY	USA	NSH; DNQ	SLM	KAN; 21	WIN	KEN; 34	TOL	IOW	POC	MCH	BLN	KEN; 39	POC										63rd	410	
2007	K&M Motorsports	7	Chevy															NSH; 18	ISF	MIL	GTW	DSF	CHI; DNQ	SLM	TAL	TOL	63rd	410	
2008	K&M Motorsports	7	Chevy	DAY	SLM	IOW	KAN; 32	CAR	KEN; 17	TOL	POC	MCH	CAY	KEN; 20	BLN	POC	NSH; 25	ISF	DSF	CHI	SLM	NJE	TAL	TOL			61st	450	
