= Phil Bozell =

American racing driver

- Born: February 1, 1983 (age 43); Portage, Michigan, U.S.

ARCA Menards Series career
- 14 races run over 6 years
- Best finish: 41st (2006)
- First race: 2003 Eddie Gilstrap Motors Fall Classic 200 (Salem)
- Last race: 2008 Hantz Group 200 (Toledo)
- First win: 2006 Governor's Cup 200 (Milwaukee)
Wins	Top tens	Poles
1	4	0
- Statistics up to date as of May 14, 2024.

Phil Bozell (born February 1, 1983) is an American professional stock car racing driver who has previously competed in the ARCA Re/Max Series.

== Racing career ==
In 2003, Bozell made his debut in the ARCA Re/Max Series at Salem Speedway, driving the No. 83 Pontiac for Capital City Motorsports, where he started 24th and finished eight laps down in eighteenth. He then ran the season ending race at South Boston Speedway, where he started in twentieth and finished two laps down in fifteenth.

In 2004, Bozell made his first start of the year at Nashville Superspeedway, this time driving the No. 38 for CCM, where he started eighteenth, and was running in the top-five late in the race before he had an issue during a pit stop and fell down to 23rd. He then made his second start of the year at Michigan International Speedway, this time driving the No. 39 Pontiac for Roulo Brothers Racing, where he started fifteenth and finished one lap down in ninth. In his next start with the team at Kentucky Speedway, he qualified in 32nd but finished 39th after failing to take the start. He then returned to CCM at the following race at Gateway International Raceway, where he started eight but finished in 21st due to transmission issues. For the following year, Bozell entered in six races for Bob Aiello, failing to qualify for his first attempt of the year at Toledo Speedway, and finishing in the top-twenty in three of the five events he qualified for, getting a best finish of fifteenth at the first Michigan race.

In 2006, Bozell joined Hagan Racing for a partial schedule, driving the No. 9 Dodge, having worked for the team the previous year in which Joey Miller finished second in the points. In five starts, he finished in the top-ten three times, including getting his first win at the Milwaukee Mile after taking the lead in the late stages of the race. He then entered with the team the following year at Salem, where he failed to qualify, before running two races with Bobby Blount in the No. 8 Dodge at Nashville an Milwaukee, finished 40th in the former event due to vibrations in the car, and eleventh in the latter race. In 2008, Bozell attempted two races that year, failing to qualify for the first Michigan racing whilst driving the No. 48 Dodge for James Hylton Motorsports, and driving at the season ending race at Toledo in his self owned No. 94 Dodge, where he finished fourteenth after starting 33rd. This would be his last race in the series, as he has since competed in series such as the CRA JEGS All-Stars Tour, where he finished in the top five in points in 2015 and 2016, the Reveal the Hammer Outlaw Super Late Model Series, the Main Event Racing Series, the Sweet Manufacturing Outlaw Super Late Model Series, and the ARCA Late Model Gold Cup Series.

== Motorsports results ==
=== ARCA Re/Max Series ===
(key) (Bold – Pole position awarded by qualifying time. Italics – Pole position earned by points standings or practice time. * – Most laps led. ** – All laps led.)

ARCA Re/Max Series results
Year	Team	No.	Make	1	2	3	4	5	6	7	8	9	10	11	12	13	14	15	16	17	18	19	20	21	22	23	ARMC	Pts	Ref
2003	Capital City Motorsports	83	Pontiac	DAY	ATL	NSH	SLM	TOL	KEN	CLT	BLN	KAN	MCH	LER	POC	POC	NSH	ISF	WIN	DSF	CHI	SLM; 18	TAL	CLT	SBO; 15		89th	295	
2004	Capital City Motorsports	38	Pontiac	DAY	NSH; 23	SLM	KEN	TOL	CLT	KAN	POC					GTW; 21	POC	LER	NSH	ISF	TOL	DSF	CHI	SLM	TAL		64th	450	
2004	Capital City Motorsports	39	Pontiac									MCH; 9	SBO	BLN	KEN; 39												64th	450	
2005	Bob Aiello	83	Chevy	DAY	NSH	SLM	KEN	TOL; DNQ	LAN	MIL	POC																55th	610	
2005	Bob Aiello	62	Pontiac									MCH; 25	KAN				GTW; 20	LER	NSH								55th	610	
2005	Bob Aiello	62	Chevy											KEN; 25	BLN	POC				MCH; 34	ISF	TOL	DSF; 19	CHI	SLM	TAL	55th	610	
2006	Hagans Racing	9	Dodge	DAY	NSH	SLM; 4	WIN	KEN	TOL; 17	POC	MCH	KAN	KEN	BLN	POC	GTW; 9	NSH	MCH	ISF	MIL; 1	TOL	DSF	CHI	SLM	TAL	IOW; 15	41st	935	
2007	Hagans Racing	9	Dodge	DAY	USA	NSH	SLM; DNQ	KAN	WIN	KEN	TOL	IOW	POC	MCH	BLN	KEN	POC										94th	235	
2007	Bobby Blount	8	Dodge															NSH; 40	ISF	MIL; 11	GTW	DSF	CHI	SLM	TAL	TOL	94th	235	
2008	James Hylton Motorsports	48	Dodge	DAY	SLM	IOW	KAN	CAR	KEN	TOL	POC	MCH; DNQ	CAY	KEN	BLN	POC	NSH	ISF	DSF	CHI	SLM	NJE	TAL				62nd	435	
2008	Sappanos-Bozell Racing	94	Dodge																					TOL; 14			62nd	435	
