= Troy Wangerin =

American racing driver

- Born: August 16, 1970 (age 56); Jordan, Minnesota, U.S.

ARCA Menards Series career
- 8 races run over 4 years
- Best finish: 76th (2009)
- First race: 2006 SK Hand Tool 200 (Chicagoland)
- Last race: 2009 Kansas Lottery 150 (Kansas)
Wins	Top tens	Poles
0	0	0
- Statistics up to date as of January 27, 2025.

Troy Wangerin (born August 16, 1970) is an American former professional stock car racing driver who has previously competed in the ARCA Racing Series from 2006 to 2009. He is the son of the late Blackie Wangerin, who competed in the NASCAR Cup Series.

Wangerin has also competed in the ASA National Tour and the American StockCar League.

== Motorsports results ==
=== ARCA Re/Max Series ===
(key) (Bold – Pole position awarded by qualifying time. Italics – Pole position earned by points standings or practice time. * – Most laps led.)

ARCA Re/Max Series results
Year	Team	No.	Make	1	2	3	4	5	6	7	8	9	10	11	12	13	14	15	16	17	18	19	20	21	22	23	ARSC	Pts	Ref
2006	Trent Wangerin Racing	40	Dodge	DAY	NSH	SLM	WIN	KEN	TOL	POC	MCH	KAN	KEN	BLN	POC	GTW	NSH	MCH	ISF	MIL	TOL	DSF	CHI; 34	SLM	TAL	IOW; 27	121st	145	
2007	Mike Feezer	40	Dodge	DAY; DNQ	USA	NSH	SLM	KAN	WIN	KEN	TOL	IOW; 26	POC	MCH; DNQ	BLN	KEN	POC	NSH	ISF	MIL; 20	GTW	DSF	CHI	SLM			84th	305	
2007	Trent Wangerin Racing	40	Dodge																						TAL; DNQ	TOL	84th	305	
2008	Wangerin Racing	31	Dodge	DAY; DNQ	SLM																						138th	85	
2008	Wangerin Racing	7	Dodge			IOW; 34	KAN	CAR	KEN	TOL	POC	MCH	CAY	KEN	BLN	POC	NSH	ISF	DSF	CHI	SLM	NJE	TAL	TOL			138th	85	
2009	Wangerin Racing	40	Dodge	DAY; DNQ	SLM	CAR	TAL; 28	KEN	TOL	POC	MCH	MFD	IOW; 21	KEN	BLN	POC	ISF	CHI	TOL	DSF	NJE	SLM	KAN; 24	CAR			76th	350	
