= Ryan Fischer =

Canadian racing driver

- Born: February 26, 1989 (age 37); Surrey, British Columbia, Canada

ARCA Menards Series career
- 10 races run over 3 years
- Best finish: 38th (2008)
- First race: 2007 Gateway ARCA 150 (Gateway)
- Last race: 2009 Lucas Oil Slick Mist 200 (Daytona)
Wins	Top tens	Poles
0	2	0
- Statistics up to date as of July 9, 2023.

Ryan Fischer (born February 26, 1989) is a Canadian former professional stock car racing driver who has previously competed in the ARCA Re/Max Series for Venturini Motorsports.

== Racing career ==
In 2006, Fischer would make select starts in the ARCA West Late Model Challenge Series, where he would get a best finish of ninth at Stateline Speedway, he would then run the full schedule the following year in 2007, getting three top-ten finishes with as best result of seventh at Stateline and Motoplex Speedway and Event Park to finish eighth in the final points standings.

It was also in 2007 that Fischer would make his ARCA Re/Max Series debut at Gateway Motorsports Park, driving the No. 25 Chevrolet for Venturini Motorsports. After starting 23rd, he was running in sixth position on a restart midway through the race when his car was pinched towards the outside retaining wall by Patrick Sheltra and sent upside down and into four barrel rolls down the backstretch. He would get out of his car unscathed and would be classified in 32nd position. He would make another start with the team at Talladega Superspeedway, where he would finish 29th after starting last on the grid. It was also during this year that he would be signed to CJM Racing as a development driver. He would then make select starts for Venturini in 2008, where he earned two top-ten finishes with a best result of third at Kentucky Speedway. In December that year, it was announced that Fischer would run full-time with Venturini Motorsports in the No. 15 car. He would finish 32nd at Daytona International Speedway due being involved in a multi-car crash during the race before being released from the team afterwards. He would then make two starts in the ARCA West Ignite Race Fuel Series, getting a best finish of tenth at Montana Raceway Park later in the year. The Montana race would be his most recent start as a driver as he has not competed since then.

== Motorsports results ==
=== ARCA Re/Max Series ===
(key) (Bold – Pole position awarded by qualifying time. Italics – Pole position earned by points standings or practice time. * – Most laps led.)

ARCA Re/Max Series results
Year	Team	No.	Make	1	2	3	4	5	6	7	8	9	10	11	12	13	14	15	16	17	18	19	20	21	22	23	ARMC	Pts	Ref
2007	Venturini Motorsports	25	Chevy	DAY	USA	NSH	SLM	KAN	WIN	KEN	TOL	IOW	POC	MCH	BLN	KEN	POC	NSH	ISF	MIL	GTW; 32	DSF	CHI	SLM	TAL; 29	TOL	128th	155	
2008	Venturini Motorsports	25	Chevy	DAY; 43	SLM	IOW	KAN; 10	CAR	KEN; 3	TOL; 26	POC	MCH; 26	CAY; 16														38th	875	
2008	Venturini Motorsports	15	Chevy											KEN; 26	BLN	POC	NSH	ISF	DSF	CHI	SLM	NJE	TAL	TOL			38th	875	
2009	Venturini Motorsports	15	Chevy	DAY; 32	SLM	CAR	TAL	KEN	TOL	POC	MCH	MFD	IOW	KEN	BLN	POC	ISF	CHI	TOL	DSF	NJE	SLM	KAN	CAR			150th	70	
