= Eddie Pearson =

American racing driver

- Born: June 21, 1965 (age 61); Spartanburg, South Carolina, U.S.

ARCA Menards Series career
- 6 races run over 5 years
- Best finish: 96th (2009)
- First race: 2005 Southern Illinois 100 (DuQuoin)
- Last race: 2011 Southern Illinois 100 (DuQuoin)
Wins	Top tens	Poles
0	0	0
- Statistics up to date as of June 13, 2024.

Eddie Pearson (born June 21, 1965) is an American former professional stock car racing driver who has previously competed in the ARCA Racing Series. He is the son of three time NASCAR Cup Series champion David Pearson, and the younger brother of former NASCAR Busch Series champion Larry Pearson.

Pearson competed in select events in the NASCAR Dash Series between 1985 and 1996, and select X-1R Pro Cup Series from 1999 to 2001.

In 2005, Pearson made his debut in the ARCA Re/Max Series at the DuQuoin State Fairgrounds dirt track, driving the No. 17 Ford for Brad Hill Racing, where he started sixteenth but finished in 28th due to rear end issues. He would make another start in the series until 2007, where he once again ran at DuQuoin with BHR in the No. 17, where he started in 25th and finished on the lead lap in thirteenth place. He returned in 2008, where he finished a lap down in eighteenth after starting in nineteenth. In 2009, he ran a both DuQuoin and at the Illinois State Fairgrounds dirt track; he finished 22nd at Springfield after starting twelfth, and 25th at DuQuoin after starting in sixth.

In 2011, Pearson entered in two races while driving the No. 71 for BHR, failing to qualify at Lucas Oil Raceway, and finishing eighteenth at DuQuoin. He has not competed in any racing series since then.

== Motorsports results ==
=== NASCAR ===
(key) (Bold – Pole position awarded by qualifying time. Italics – Pole position earned by points standings or practice time. * – Most laps led.)

==== Goody's Dash Series ====
NASCAR Goody's Dash Series results
Year	Team	No.	Make	1	2	3	4	5	6	7	8	9	10	11	12	13	14	15	16	17	18	19	20	21	NGDS	Pts	Ref
1985	Pearson Racing	41	Ford	DAY	LAN	GRE	CLT; 15	ODS	LAN	BIR	MMS	ROU	SBO	STH	ODS	HCY	CLT								N/A	0	
1986	N/A	12	Pontiac	DAY; 23	HCY	LAN	ASH	FCS	ROU	CLT	POC	STH	LAN	SBO	BRI	HCY	SBO	HCY	CLT	NWS					N/A	0	
1988	N/A	41	Pontiac	DAY	ROU	HCY	MYB	CLT; 30										CLT; 15							33rd	309	
1988	N/A	27	Pontiac						ASH; 15	NSV	SUM	STH	LAN	AND; DNS	MYB	LAN	HCY								33rd	309	
1995	N/A	72	Pontiac	DAY	FLO	LAN	MYB	SUM	HCY	CAR	STH	BRI	SUM	GRE	BGS	MYB	NSV	FLO	NWS	VOL	HCY; 24	HOM			N/A	0	
1996	N/A	72	Pontiac	DAY	HOM	MYB; 24	SUM; 19	NSV	TRI	CAR	HCY	FLO	BRI	SUM	GRE	SNM	BGS	MYB	LAN	STH	FLO	NWS	VOL	HCY	N/A	0	

=== ARCA Racing Series ===
(key) (Bold – Pole position awarded by qualifying time. Italics – Pole position earned by points standings or practice time. * – Most laps led. ** – All laps led.)

ARCA Racing Series results
Year	Team	No.	Make	1	2	3	4	5	6	7	8	9	10	11	12	13	14	15	16	17	18	19	20	21	22	23	ARSC	Pts	Ref
2005	Brad Hill Racing	17	Ford	DAY	NSH	SLM	KEN	TOL	LAN	MIL	POC	MCH	KAN	KEN	BLN	POC	GTW	LER	NSH	MCH	ISF	TOL	DSF; 28	CHI	SLM	TAL	156th	90	
2007	Brad Hill Racing	17	Ford	DAY	USA	NSH	SLM	KAN	WIN	KEN	TOL	IOW	POC	MCH	BLN	KEN	POC	NSH	ISF	MIL	GTW	DSF; 13	CHI	SLM	TAL	TOL	126th	165	
2008	Brad Hill Racing	17	Ford	DAY	SLM	IOW	KAN	CAR	KEN	TOL	POC	MCH	CAY	KEN	BLN	POC	NSH	ISF	DSF; 18	CHI	SLM	NJE	TAL	TOL			121st	140	
2009	Brad Hill Racing	17	Ford	DAY	SLM	CAR	TAL	KEN	TOL	POC	MCH	MFD	IOW	KEN	BLN	POC	ISF; 22	CHI	TOL	DSF; 25	NJE	SLM	KAN	CAR			96th	225	
2011	Brad Hill Racing	71	Ford	DAY	TAL	SLM	TOL	NJE	CHI	POC	MCH	WIN	BLN	IOW	IRP; DNQ	POC	ISF	MAD	DSF; 18	SLM	KAN	TOL					110th	165	
