= David Simko =

Racecar driver from Michigan

- Born: November 26, 1954 (age 71); Clarkston, Michigan, U.S.
- Awards: 1985 ARCA SuperCar Series Rookie of the Year

NASCAR Cup Series career
- 10 races run over 6 years
- Best finish: 57th (1987)
- First race: 1982 Winston 500 (Talladega)
- Last race: 1988 1988 Miller High Life 400 (Michigan International Speedway)
Wins	Top tens	Poles
0	0	0

NASCAR O'Reilly Auto Parts Series career
- 1 race run over 1 year
- Best finish: 105th (1985)
- First race: 1985 Kroger 200 (IRP)
Wins	Top tens	Poles
0	0	0

David Simko (born November 26, 1954, in Clarkston, Michigan) is an American former NASCAR Winston Cup Series driver who participated in ten races throughout six seasons.

While failing to qualify in five different races, Simko managed to participate in 1472 laps – the equivalent of 2,438.1 miles (3,923.7 km) of top-level racing. His average starting position was 35th. His average finishing position was 32nd. Total career earnings for this driver was $17,220 ($46,877.74 when adjusted for inflation). He is the father of former ARCA Racing Series driver Michael Simko.
