= Danny Sammons =

American racing driver

- Nationality: American
- Born: March 19, 1984 (age 42)

NASCAR Whelen Modified Tour career
- Debut season: 2006
- Years active: 2006–2008
- Starts: 41
- Championships: 0
- Wins: 0
- Poles: 0
- Best finish: 15th in 2008
- Statistics up to date as of September 3, 2024.

Danny Sammons (born March 19, 1984) is an American former professional stock car racing driver who competed in the NASCAR Whelen Modified Tour from 2006 to 2008. Sammons family publishes the popular racing periodical Area Auto Racing News.

Sammons has also previously competed in series such as the ARCA Re/Max Series, what is now known as the ARCA Menards Series East, the X-1R Pro Cup Series, the PRO Truck Tour, and the World Series of Asphalt Stock Car Racing.

== Early life and education ==
Raised in Bordentown, New Jersey, Sammons graduated from Bordentown Regional High School in 2002.

== Motorsports results ==
=== NASCAR ===
(key) (Bold – Pole position awarded by qualifying time. Italics – Pole position earned by points standings or practice time. * – Most laps led.)

==== Busch East Series ====
NASCAR Busch East Series results
Year	Team	No.	Make	1	2	3	4	5	6	7	8	9	10	11	NBESC	Pts	Ref
2006	Solhem Racing	00	Chevy	GRE	STA	HOL	TMP	ERI	NHA; 36	ADI	WFD	NHA; 38	DOV	LRP	55th	101	

==== Whelen Modified Tour ====
NASCAR Whelen Modified Tour results
Year	Team	No.	Make	1	2	3	4	5	6	7	8	9	10	11	12	13	14	15	16	NWMTC	Pts	Ref
2006	Ralph Solhem	0	Chevy	TMP; 31	STA; 10	JEN; DNQ	TMP; 27	STA; 26	NHA; 23	HOL; 7	RIV; DNQ	STA; DNQ	TMP; 33	MAR; 18	TMP; 35	NHA; 21	WFD; 25	TMP; 10	STA; 17	24th	1426	
2007	Ralph Solhem	0	Chevy	TMP; 33	STA; 22	WTO; 13	STA; 17	TMP; 16	NHA; 25	TSA; 24	RIV; 6	STA; 17	TMP; 33	MAN; 25	MAR; 21	NHA; 38	TMP; 35	STA	TMP	24th	1312	
2008	Ralph Solhem	0	Chevy	TMP; 34	STA; 16	STA; 19	TMP; 34	NHA; 23	SPE; 9	RIV; DNQ	STA; 8	TMP; 8	MAN; 18	TMP; 12	NHA; 5	MAR; 17	CHE; 23	STA; 16	TMP; 29	15th	1723	

=== ARCA Re/Max Series ===
(key) (Bold – Pole position awarded by qualifying time. Italics – Pole position earned by points standings or practice time. * – Most laps led.)

ARCA Re/Max Series results
Year	Team	No.	Make	1	2	3	4	5	6	7	8	9	10	11	12	13	14	15	16	17	18	19	20	21	ARMC	Pts	Ref
2008	Ralph Solhem Racing	38	Chevy	DAY; 28	SLM	IOW	KEN	CAR	KEN	TOL	POC	MCH	CAY	KEN	BLN	POC	NSH	ISF	DSF	CHI	SLM	NJE	TAL	TOL	135th	90	
