= Jake Francis =

American racing driver

- Born: Jacob Dale Francis; September 18, 1989 (age 37); Le Roy, Ohio, U.S.

ARCA Menards Series career
- 7 races run over 4 years
- Best finish: 40th (2008)
- First race: 2007 Governor's Cup 200 (Milwaukee)
- Last race: 2016 Menards 200 (Toledo)
Wins	Top tens	Poles
0	0	0
- Statistics up to date as of June 12, 2024.

Jake Francis (born September 18, 1989) is an American professional stock car racing driver who has previously competed in the ARCA Racing Series.

== Racing career ==
In 2007, Francis made his debut in the ARCA Re/Max Series at the Milwaukee Mile at the age of seventeen, driving the No. 61 Dodge for Jake Francis Inc., a team he co-owned with his father. He qualified in 23rd and finished two laps down in twelfth place. He then entered in the series finale at Toledo Speedway, this time driving the No. 62 Pontiac for Andy Belmont Racing, but ultimately failed to qualify. For the following year, he entered in five of the first six races of the year, failing to qualify for the event at Daytona International Speedway, and getting a best finish of nineteenth at Kentucky Speedway. He also entered in the season ending race at Toledo, this time driving the No. 80 Ford for Hover Motorsports, where he once again failed to qualify. Afterwards, he did not make another attempt in the series for the next four years, primarily competing in the ARCA Late Model Gold Cup Series.

In 2013, Francis returned to the now ARCA Racing Series at Toledo, this time driving the No. 61 Chevrolet for Francis Engineering Racing, where he qualified in twentieth but finished in 21st due to clutch issues. Afterwards, he did not make another attempt in the series until 2016, where he qualified in nineteenth but finished in 22nd due to engine issues. He has not made another attempt in the series since then.

== Motorsports results ==
=== ARCA Racing Series ===
(key) (Bold – Pole position awarded by qualifying time. Italics – Pole position earned by points standings or practice time. * – Most laps led. ** – All laps led.)

ARCA Racing Series results
Year	Team	No.	Make	1	2	3	4	5	6	7	8	9	10	11	12	13	14	15	16	17	18	19	20	21	22	23	ARSC	Pts	Ref
2007	Jake Francis Inc.	61	Dodge	DAY	USA	NSH	SLM	KAN	WIN	KEN	TOL	IOW	POC	MCH	BLN	KEN	POC	NSH	ISF	MIL; 12	GTW	DSF	CHI	SLM	TAL		113th	195	
2007	Andy Belmont Racing	62	Pontiac																							TOL; DNQ	113th	195	
2008	Andy Belmont Racing	14	Chevy	DAY; DNQ																							40th	745	
2008	Jake Francis Inc.	7	Chevy		SLM; 24																						40th	745	
2008	Capital City Motorsports	48	Dodge			IOW; 20	KAN; 33	CAR	KEN; 19	TOL	POC	MCH	CAY	KEN	BLN	POC	NSH	ISF	DSF	CHI	SLM	NJE	TAL				40th	745	
2008	Hover Motorsports	80	Ford																					TOL; DNQ			40th	745	
2013	Francis Engineering Racing	61	Chevy	DAY	MOB	SLM	TAL	TOL; 21	ELK	POC	MCH	ROA	WIN	CHI	NJM	POC	BLN	ISF	MAD	DSF	IOW	SLM	KEN	KAN			129th	125	
2016	Francis Engineering Racing	61	Chevy	DAY	NSH	SLM	TAL	TOL; 22	NJE	POC	MCH	MAD	WIN	IOW	IRP	POC	BLN	ISF	DSF	SLM	CHI	KEN	KAN				125th	120	

=== ASA STARS National Tour ===
(key) (Bold – Pole position awarded by qualifying time. Italics – Pole position earned by points standings or practice time. * – Most laps led. ** – All laps led.)

ASA STARS National Tour results
Year	Team	No.	Make	1	2	3	4	5	6	7	8	9	10	ASNTC	Pts	Ref
2024	Francis Engineering	33	Chevy	NSM	FIF	HCY	MAD	MLW	AND	OWO	TOL; 15	WIN	NSV	62nd	37	
