= Matt Hawkins (racing driver) =

American racing driver

- Born: January 12, 1988; Canton, Georgia, U.S.
- Died: February 14, 2009 (aged 21); Ball Ground, Georgia, U.S.

ARCA Menards Series career
- 5 races run over 1 year
- Best finish: 34th (2008)
- First race: 2008 Prairie Meadows 250 (Iowa)
- Last race: 2008 Toyota 150 (Nashville)
- First win: 2008 Prairie Meadows 250 (Iowa)
Wins	Top tens	Poles
1	4	0
- Statistics up to date as of November 7, 2022.

Matthew Hawkins (born January 12, 1988 – February 14, 2009) was an American professional racing driver. He had competed in the ARCA Re/Max Series for one season in 2008, but scored one win and four top-ten finishes. Prior to this, he had won the Snowflake 100 at Five Flags Speedway in 2006, and the Southern All-Star Super Late Model Series championship in 2005.

== Racing career ==
Hawkins would start racing in go-karts when he was four years old before progressing to late models years later.

In 2004, Hawkins would run in various late model series and events, including the All American 400 at Nashville Fairgrounds Speedway. In the following year, he would run the Southern All-Star Super Late Model Series, winning the championship in his only full-time year in the series. He would run the X-1R Pro Cup Series in both the South and National divisions in 2007, finishing ninth and sixth in points respectively.

In 2008, Hawkins would make his ARCA Re/Max Series debut at Iowa Speedway in the No. 39 Dodge owned by his father Fred. He would qualify 28th, but would go on to win the race ahead of Justin Allgaier. He would make four more starts, earning three top-tens, including a duo of fourth place finishes at Rockingham Speedway and Nashville Superspeedway, and was originally due to run another partial schedule the following year.

== Death ==
On February 14, 2009, at approximately five in the morning, Hawkins died in his home at Ball Ground, Georgia as a result of a self-inflicted gun shot wound. He had been showing off a 9 mm pistol to his friends before the bullet in the pistol struck Hawkins in the head. He was transported to Northside Community Hospital where he was pronounced dead from his injuries. The shooting was deemed as accidental and not a result of foul play by the Cherokee County Sheriff's office spokesman Sgt. Jay Baker.

== Motorsports results ==
=== ARCA Re/Max Series ===
(key) (Bold – Pole position awarded by qualifying time. Italics – Pole position earned by points standings or practice time. * – Most laps led.)

ARCA Re/Max Series results
Year	Team	No.	Make	1	2	3	4	5	6	7	8	9	10	11	12	13	14	15	16	17	18	19	20	21	ARSC	Pts	Ref
2008	Matt Hawkins Racing	39	Dodge	DAY	SLM	IOW; 1	KAN	CAR; 4	KEN	TOL	POC	MCH; 29	CAY	KEN; 6	BLN	POC	NSH; 4	ISF	DSF	CHI	SLM	NJE	TAL	TOL	34th	940	
