= Raritan Valley Community College =

Public college in Branchburg, New Jersey, US

Coordinates: 40.60663°N 74.694319°W

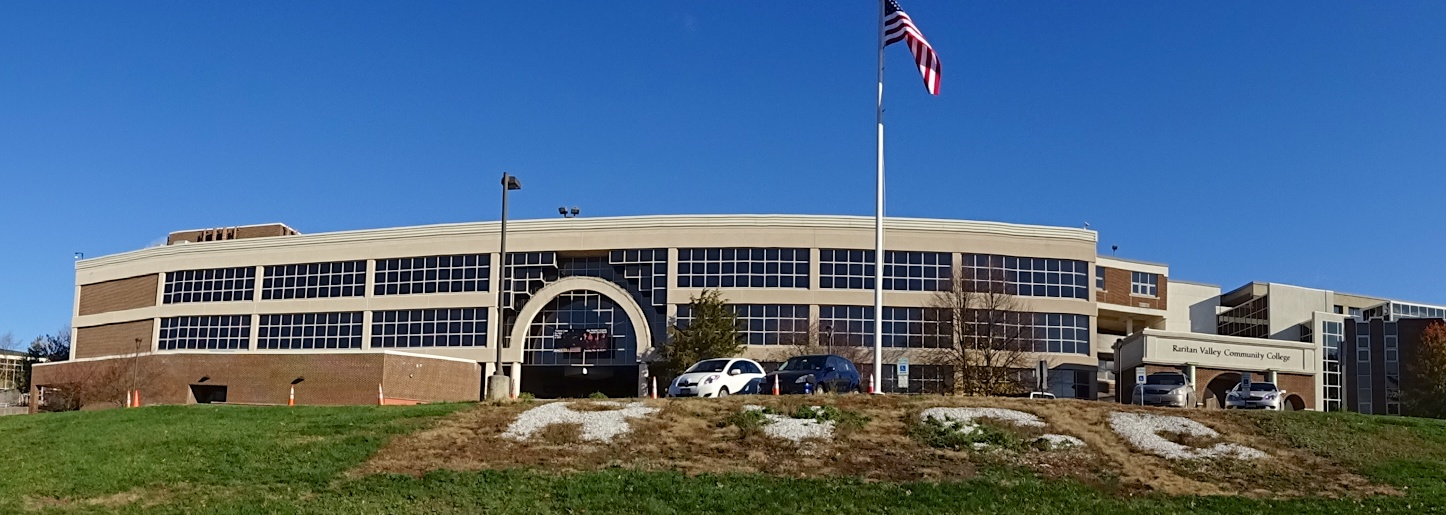
- Type: Public community college
- Established: 1965
- Academic affiliations: Space-grant
- President: Dr. Michael McDonough
- Location: Branchburg, New Jersey, United States
- Campus: Suburban
- Newspaper: www.rvccrecord.com
- Colors: Green and gold
- Nickname: Golden Lions
- Mascot: Golden Lion
- Website: www.raritanval.edu

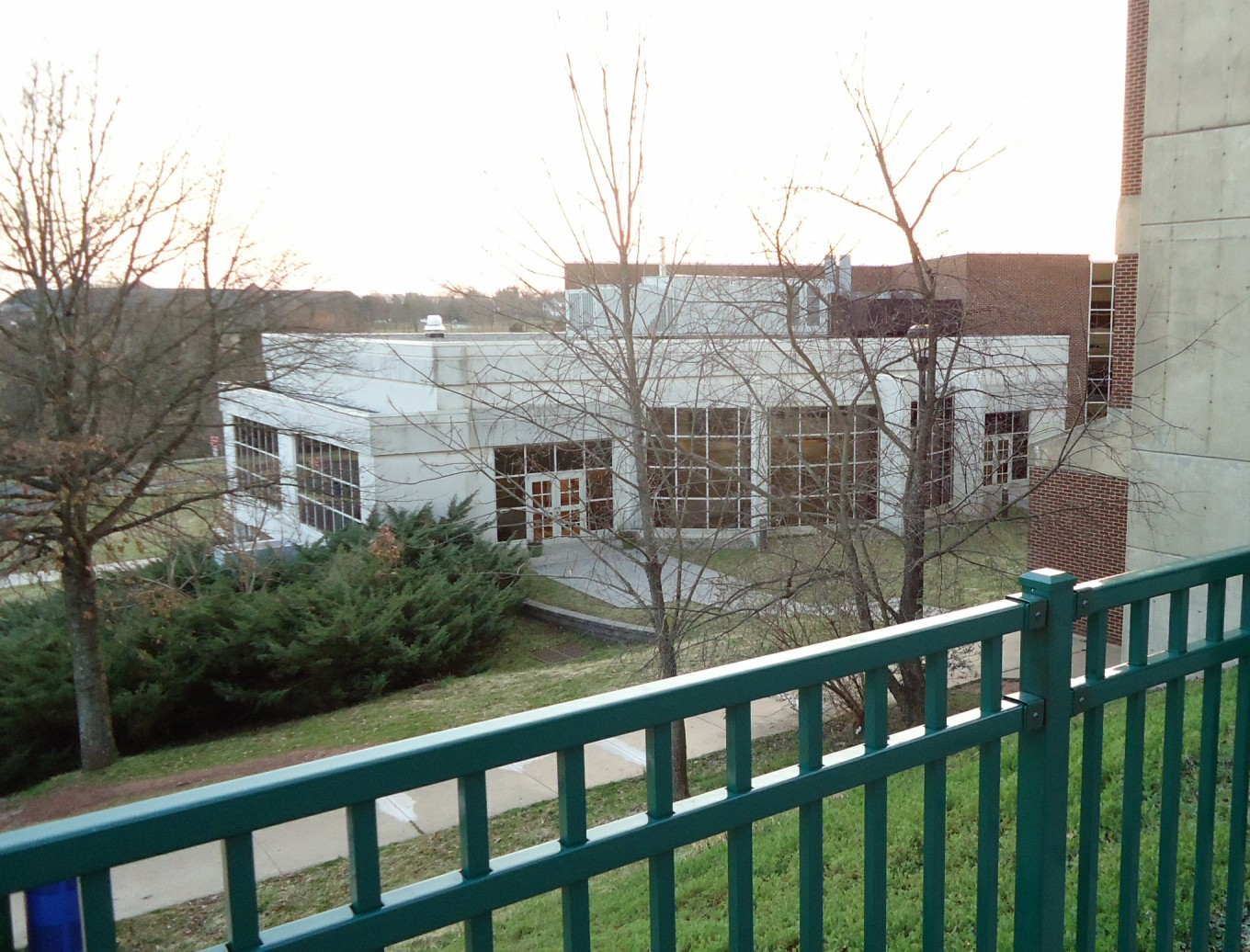
View of conference center

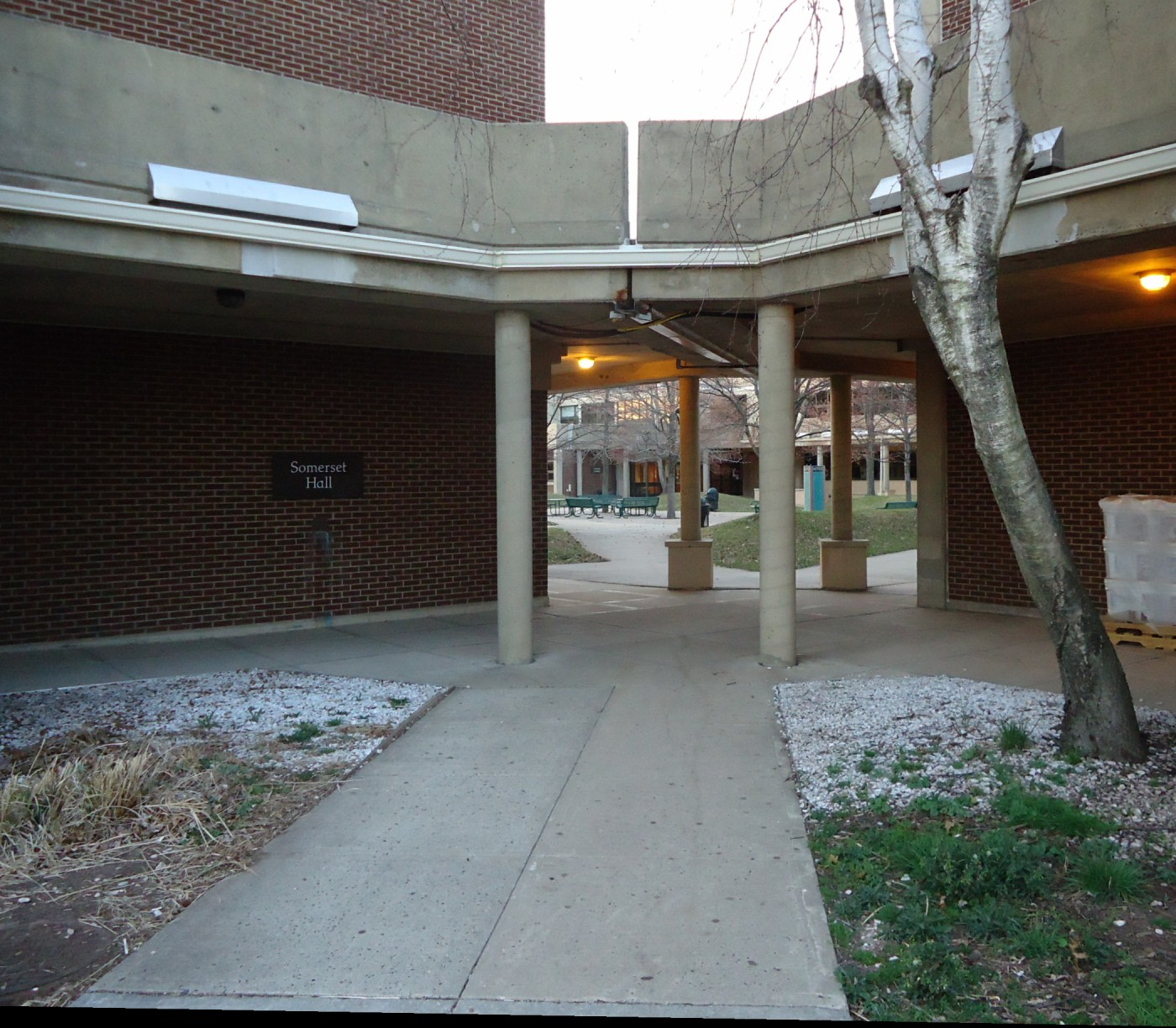
Entrance to main courtyard and student center.

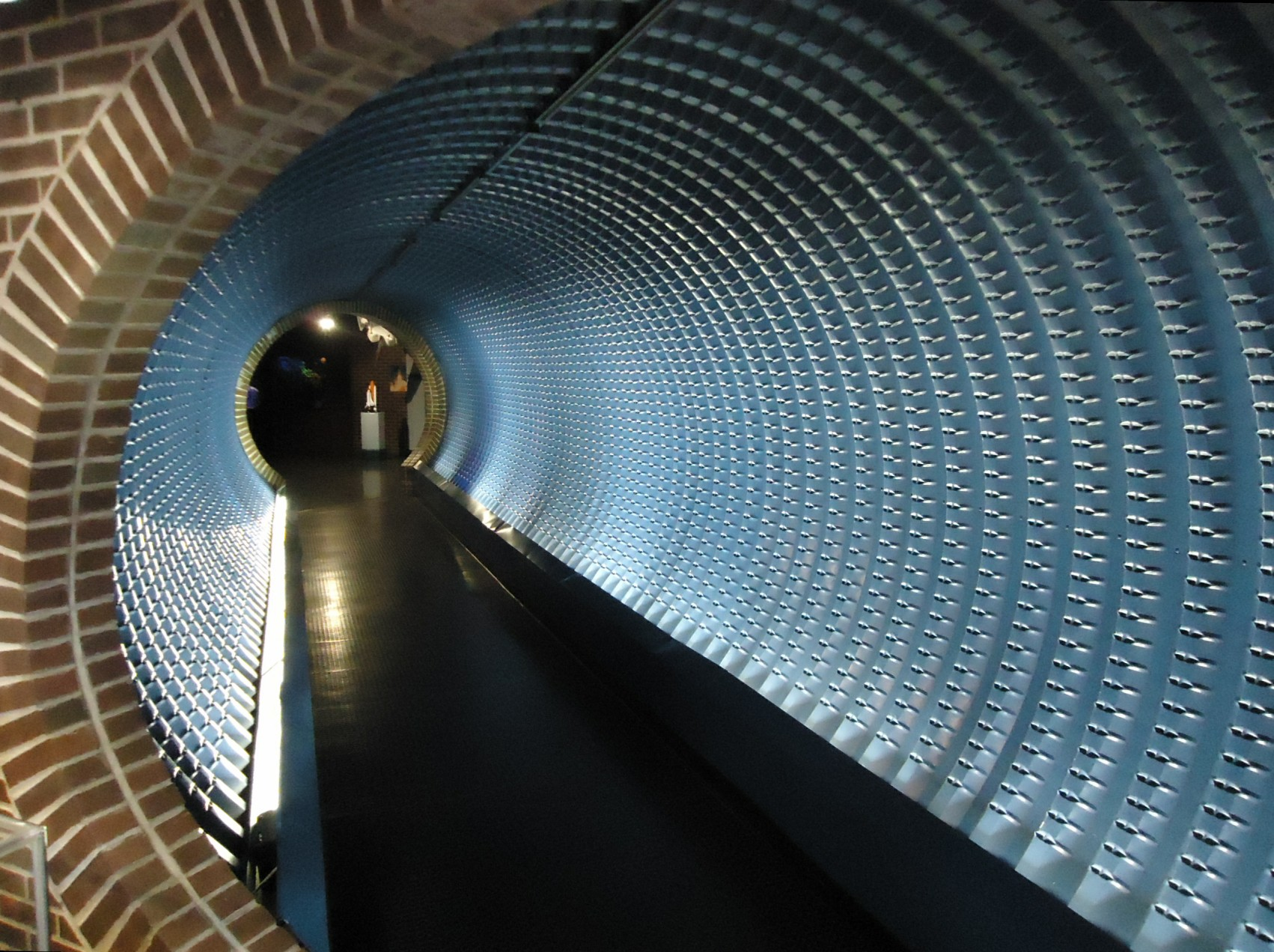
A cylindrical hallway is the entrance to the planetarium.

Raritan Valley Community College (RVCC) is a public community college in Branchburg, New Jersey. RVCC offers Associate degree programs leading to an Associate of Arts (A.A.), Associate of Science (A.S.), Associate of Fine Art (A.F.A), or an Associate of Applied Science (A.A.S.), as well as certificate programs and continuing education courses.

The college was founded in late 1965 as Somerset County College and opened to its first class of students in the fall of 1968. It was given its present name in 1987, when it became the county college for Hunterdon County as well as its home of Somerset County. It was the first community college in New Jersey to be sponsored by two different counties. Raritan Valley's University Center offers degree completion programs from a number of schools and university partners including Rutgers University.

== Accreditation ==
Raritan Valley Community College is accredited by the Middle States Association of Colleges and Schools. Programs offered by the college are accredited by the Accreditation Commission for Education in Nursing, Commission on Accreditation for Health Informatics and Information Management Education, Commission on Accreditation of Allied Health Education Programs, Commission on Opticianry Accreditation, and American Bar Association.

== Library ==
In March 1985, Raritan Valley Community College opened its College Performing Arts Center and library. On its 25th anniversary in 1993, RVCC named the library in honor of founding trustee Evelyn S. Field. The Evelyn S. Field Library serves as the college's academic research library with special collections of the Institute for Holocaust and Genocide Studies and the Robeson Institute for Ethics, Leadership, and Social Justice.

Anyone who lives or works in Somerset or Hunterdon County is eligible for a library card.

== Notable alumni ==
- Billy Pauch Jr. (born 1987), professional stock car racing driver
