= Billy Pauch Jr. =

American racing driver

- Nationality: American
- Born: June 16, 1987 (age 39) Frenchtown, New Jersey, U.S.

Modified racing career
- Debut season: 2003
- Car number: 1, 14, 96,15
- Championships: 5
- Wins: 153

Previous series
- 2003-present Wins Championships 1996-2003: Sprint car, SpeedSTR & Midget; 49; 5 Quarter Midgets & Micro Sprints

Championship titles
- 2014 New Egypt All Star Cup

NASCAR Whelen Modified Tour
- Years active: 2006–2008
- Starts: 29

ARCA Menards Series career
- 4 races run over 2 years
- Best finish: 73rd (2008)
- First race: 2007 Pocono 200 (Pocono)
- Last race: 2008 Pennsylvania ARCA 200 (Pocono)
Wins	Top tens	Poles
0	0	0
- Statistics up to date as of June 10, 2025.

Billy Pauch Jr. (born June 16, 1987) is an American professional stock car racing driver who has previously competed in the NASCAR Whelen Modified Tour and the ARCA Re/Max Series.

== Early life ==
The son of racecar driver Billy Pauch, he was raised in Kingwood Township, New Jersey, and graduated from Delaware Valley Regional High School, before attending Raritan Valley Community College and Rider University.

== Racing career ==
Since 2009, Pauch has competed primarily in the dirt modified division, and claimed track championships at Big Diamond Speedway in Pottsville, Pennsylvania, Georgetown Speedway, Delaware, and Bridgeport and New Egypt Speedways in New Jersey. He has also previously competed in series such as the Super DIRTcar Big-Block Modified Series, the Pennsylvania Tri-Track Modified Series, the Short Track Super Series, the USAC Silver Crown Series, the Chili Bowl Nationals, and the World Series of Asphalt Stock Car Racing.

Pauch also appears at the Action Track USA in Kutztown, Pennsylvania, where he is credited with four track championships in the SpeedSTR class, and an additional crown in the Wingless 600 sprints.

== Personal life ==
Pauch's sister, Mandee Pauch Mahaney was honored as the 2024 Outstanding Woman in Racing by the Northeast Dirt Modified Hall of Fame for her work as a content creator and media personality. Building on her experiences authoring a magazine column, writing a blog, and TV pit reporting, Paunch Mahaney launched her YouTube channel, “Dirt Track Untold” in 2017.

== Motorsports results ==
=== NASCAR ===
(key) (Bold – Pole position awarded by qualifying time. Italics – Pole position earned by points standings or practice time. * – Most laps led.)

==== Whelen Modified Tour ====
NASCAR Whelen Modified Tour results
Year	Team	No.	Make	1	2	3	4	5	6	7	8	9	10	11	12	13	14	15	16	NWMTC	Pts	Ref
2006	Dick Greenfield	06	Dodge	TMP	STA	JEN	TMP	STA	NHA	HOL	RIV	STA	TMP	MAR	TMP	NHA	WFD; DNQ	TMP; 21	STA; DNQ	46th	231	
2007	Dick Greenfield	06	Dodge	TMP; 12	STA; 21	WTO; 10	STA; 20	TMP; 34	NHA; 20	TSA; 26	RIV	STA; 13	TMP; 6	MAN; 16	MAR; 13	NHA; 20	TMP; 26	STA; 29	TMP; 21	18th	1590	
2008	Dick Greenfield	06	Dodge	TMP; 18	STA; 22	STA; 14	TMP; 31	NHA; 20	SPE	RIV	STA; 13	TMP; 14	MAN; 11	TMP; 7	NHA; 15	MAR; 24	CHE; 19	STA; 17	TMP; DNQ	22nd	1506	

=== ARCA Re/Max Series ===
(key) (Bold – Pole position awarded by qualifying time. Italics – Pole position earned by points standings or practice time. * – Most laps led.)

ARCA Re/Max Series results
Year	Team	No.	Make	1	2	3	4	5	6	7	8	9	10	11	12	13	14	15	16	17	18	19	20	21	22	23	ARMC	Pts	Ref
2007	Dick Greenfield Racing	09	Dodge	DAY	USA	NSH	SLM	KAN	WIN	KEN	TOL	IOW	POC; 28	MCH	BLN	KEN	POC; 13	NSH	ISF	MIL	GTW	DSF	CHI	SLM	TAL	TOL	89th	255	
2008	Dick Greenfield Racing	49	Dodge	DAY	SLM	IOW	KEN	CAR	KEN	TOL	POC; 13	MCH	CAY	KEN	BLN	POC; 15	NSH	ISF	DSF	CHI	SLM	NJE	TAL	TOL			73rd	320	
