= Billy Wease =

American racing driver

- Nationality: (United States) American
- Born: October 9, 1986 (age 40) Noblesville, Indiana, U.S.

USAC Silver Crown Series career
- Debut season: 2007
- Starts: 13
- Wins: 0
- Poles: 0
- Best finish: 8th in 2007

Championship titles
- 2006: Turkey Night Grand Prix

Billy Wease (born October 9, 1986, in Noblesville, Indiana) is a driver in USAC. He was a development driver for Penske Racing in the mid-2000s. Wease was also the 2006 Turkey Night Grand Prix winner, and a four-time starter of the Little 500.

Wease also competed in two ARCA Re/Max Series races and failed to qualify to one, all of them for Penske Racing. His best finish was second.
