= ARCA races at Rockingham =

ARCA race at Rockingham Speedway

Rockingham ARCA Menards Series East 125

ARCA Menards Series East
- Venue: Rockingham Speedway, Rockingham, North Carolina
- First race: 1973
- Distance: 125 miles (201 km)
- Laps: 125
- Previous names: ARCA Menards Series: Tar Heel 300 (1973) Carolina 500 (2008) ARCA Re/MAX Carolina 200 (2009 spring) American 200 presented by Black's Tire and Auto Service (2010); ARCA Menards Series East: AC-Delco 200 (1987) Goodwrench 200 (1988-1992) Classic 3 Championship (2012) Rockingham ARCA 125 (2025) Rockingham ARCA Menards Series East 125 (2026)
- Most wins (team): Venturini Motorsports (2)
- Most wins (manufacturer): Chevrolet (6)

The ARCA Menards Series East has held several races at Rockingham Speedway in Rockingham, North Carolina over the years. Charlie Glotzbach won the inaugural event in 1973.

In 2024, it was announced that the ARCA Menards Series East would return as a support race of the NASCAR Craftsman Truck Series and NASCAR Xfinity Series races.

== History ==
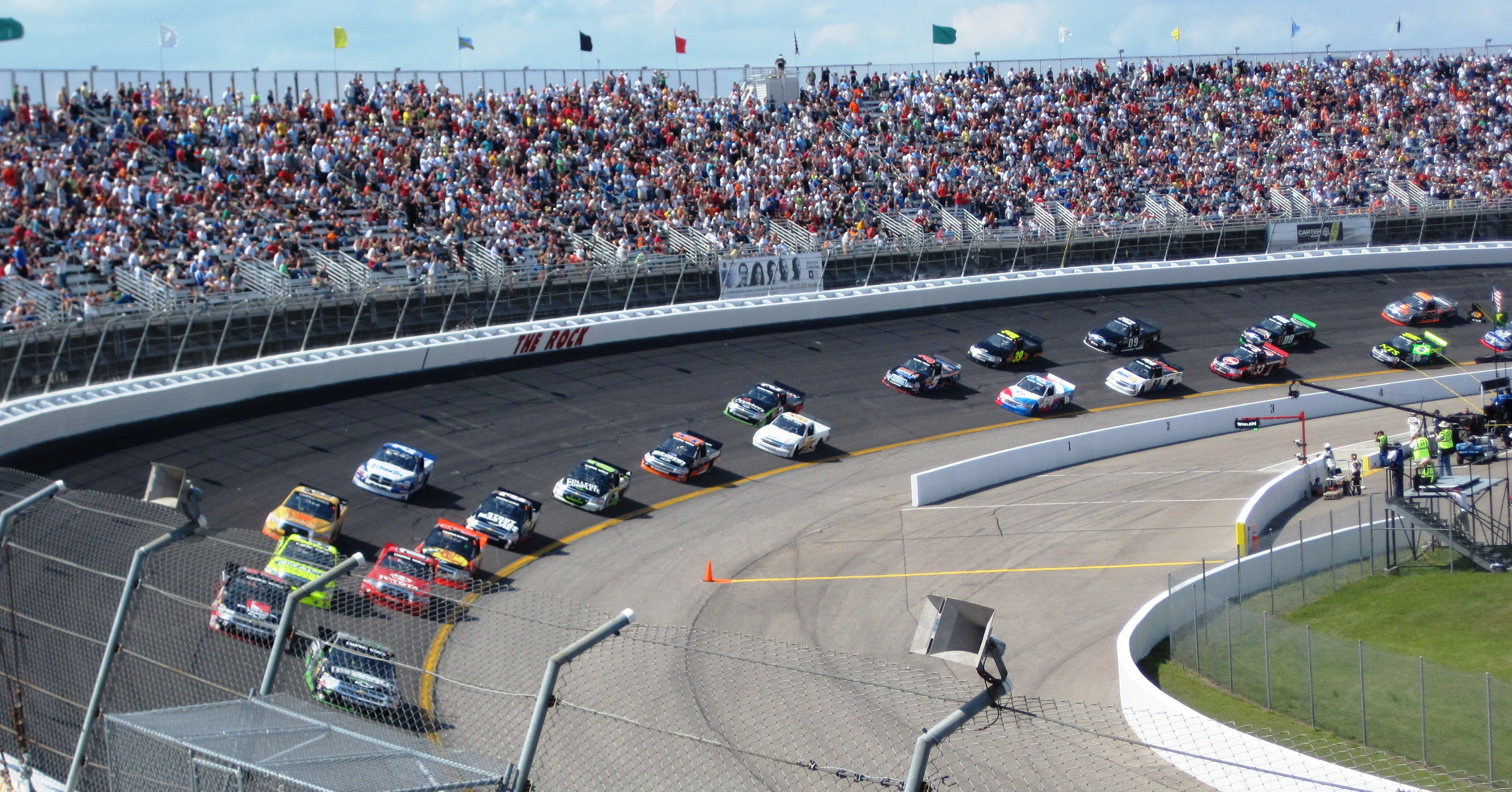
NASCAR Camping World Truck Series at Rockingham Speedway in 2012

During the inaugural race, Charlie Glotzbach led 285 laps out of 295 to win ahead of Charlie Blanton, who was two laps down. Before the race, only 13 cars were able to qualify before rain moved into the area, causing the remainder of the grid lined up according to sign-in time at the track. From 1987 to 1992, the NASCAR Busch Series (now O'Reilly Auto Parts Series) combined with the Busch North Series (now the ARCA Menards Series East). In 2008, the race returned to Rockingham and was won by Joey Logano after taking the pole position and leading 257 laps out of 312. In 2009 Sean Caisse won the spring event, and Parker Kligerman won in the fall. The final race in the main ARCA series was held in 2010, and was won by Ty Dillon. In 2012, the NASCAR K&N Pro Series East raced their championship race and was won by Tyler Reddick.

In October 2024, it was announced that the ARCA Menards Series East would return to Rockingham as a support race of the NASCAR Craftsman Truck Series and NASCAR Xfinity Series races, and it was confirmed in the calendar in December 2024.

== Past winners ==
Year	Date	Driver	Team	Manufacturer	Race Distance		Race Time	Average Speed (mph)	Report
Year	Date	Driver	Team	Manufacturer	Laps	Miles (km)	Race Time	Average Speed (mph)	Report
ARCA Menards Series race
1973	June 10	Charlie Glotzbach	N/A	Chevrolet	295	300 (480)	2:31:56	118.476	Report
1974 - 2007	Not held								
2008	May 4	Joey Logano	Venturini Motorsports	Chevrolet	312	312 (502)	3:16:16	95.38	Report
2009	April 19	Sean Caisse	Venturini Motorsports	Chevrolet	200	200 (320)	1:54:28	104.834	Report
2009	October 11	Parker Kligerman	Cunningham Motorsports	Dodge	200	200 (320)	1:51:08	107.978	Report
2010	April 19	Ty Dillon	Richard Childress Racing	Chevrolet	200	200 (320)	1:51:17	107.829	Report
2011	Not held								
ARCA Menards Series East race
1987	October 24	Morgan Shepherd	Shepherd Racing	Buick	197	200 (320)	1:52:29	106.396	Report
1988	March 5	Mark Martin	Bill Davis Racing	Ford	197	200 (320)	1:54:52	104.651	Report
1989	March 4	Rob Moroso	Moroso Racing	Oldsmobile	197	200 (320)	1:45:51	113.566	Report
1990	March 3	Dale Earnhardt	Dale Earnhardt, Inc.	Chevrolet	197	200 (320)	1:52:24	106.948	Report
1991	March 2	Dale Jarrett	DAJ Racing	Pontiac	197	200 (320)	1:48:31	110.775	Report
1992	February 29	Ward Burton	A.G. Dillard Motorsports	Buick	197	200 (320)	2:11:10	96.646	Report
1993 - 2011	Not held								
2012	November 3	Tyler Reddick	Curb Racing	Dodge	100	100 (220)	1:06:04	90.817	Report
2013 - 2024	Not held								
2025	April 19	Brent Crews	Joe Gibbs Racing	Toyota	125	125 (201)	1:15:25	93.481	Report
2026	April 4	Tristan McKee	Pinnacle Racing Group	Chevrolet	125	125 (201)			Report

Previous race: Cook Out 200	ARCA Menards Series East; Rockingham ARCA Menards Series East 125	Next race: Cook Out Music City 150
