= Salem Speedway =

Racetrack

- Oval Circuit (1947–present)
- Location: 2729 Hwy 56 West; Salem, Indiana
- Coordinates: 38°36′00″N 86°08′25″W
- Capacity: 6,000
- Owner: WB Harmon & Melissa Middleton (2025-present); Nick Bohanon (2023–2025); Bill Kniesly (2020–2022); Owen & Beverly Thompson (1996–2019); Don Gettelfinger Sr. (1987–1995)
- Opened: 22 June 1947; 79 years ago Re-opened: 1996
- Closed: May 1995; 31 years ago
- Former names: Salem Super Speedway
- Major events: Current: ARCA Menards Series; Salem ARCA 200 (1955–1957, 1959, 1962-1977, 1979, 1987–1989, 1992–2019, 2021–present); Former: X-1R Pro Cup (2002–2008); ASA National Tour (1998–2003); NASCAR Southeast Series (1996–1997); NASCAR Grand National East Series (1973)

Oval Circuit (1947–present)
- Surface: Asphalt
- Length: 0.893 km (0.555 mi)
- Turns: 2
- Banking: 33°
- Race lap record: 0:16.959 (Corey Deuser, Deuser Motorsports, 2023, Super Late Model)

Salem Speedway is a 0.555 mi (0.893 km) long paved oval racetrack in Washington Township, Washington County, near Salem, Indiana, United States, approximately 100 miles (160 km) south of Indianapolis. The track has 33° degrees of banking in the corners. Major auto racing series that run at Salem are ARCA and USAC.

== History ==
Salem Motor Speedway, as it was called then, opened June 22, 1947. Two drivers were involved in a crash on the first lap of the first race. One died at the track, the other a few years later of complications from the injury. The track received major storm damage in 1981 and it was not used until 1987. The storm ripped the roof off the grandstands, the walkway over the track to the infield was damaged as well as fences. The walkway was salvaged and Don Gettelfinger Sr. bought the track in 1987 and he replaced the fence with concrete. The track closed in May 1995 when he declared bankruptcy. Owen and Beverly Thompson bought the track and reopened it in 1996 after adding a new building, redoing the grandstand seating to a new capacity of 6000 people, and renovating the pits. Thompson sold the track to Bill Kniesly in 2020. Former driver Nick Bohanon bought the racetrack in December 2022. Brent Harmon and Melissa Middleton bought the racetrack in January 2026.

== Appearance of Touring Series ==
The NASCAR Grand National East Series ran one race at the speedway; it was won by Bruce Gould in 1973.

The ASA National Tour ran six races at the track, from 1998 through 2003 and the winners were Scott Hansen (twice), David Stremme, Tim Sauter, Gary St. Amant and Robbie Pyle.

USAR ran seven races at the track between 2002 and 2008; winners include Brian Ross, Joel Kauffman, Mikey Kile, Jeff Agnew, Gary St. Amant.

NASCAR Southeast Series ran two races at the facility between 1996 and 1997; the races were won by Steven Christian and Ron Young respectively.

Salem Speedway has seen many great racers, such as Troy Ruttman, Pancho Carter, Bob Sweikert, Pat O’Connor, Parnelli Jones, A. J. Foyt, Al Unser, Mario Andretti, Rich Vogler, Bobby Allison, Johnny Parsons, Darrell Waltrip, Jeff Gordon, Mark Martin, Tony Stewart, Jimmie Johnson, Ryan Newman, Kurt and Kyle Busch, Kasey Kahne, Ken Schrader, Joey Logano, and more. In 2018, Kody Swanson broke the all-time USAC Silver Crown record with his 24th series win at Salem.

As of 2019, the track has held more ARCA races than any other track (106th visit); it held races at the track since 1955. The ARCA qualifying record is 16.785 seconds/119.035 mph by Gary Bradberry in 1994.

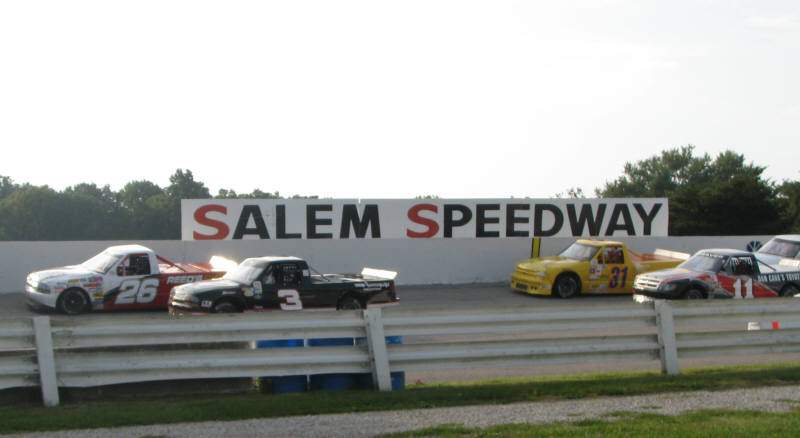
ARCA Lincoln Welders Truck Series Trucks at Salem, September 16, 2006

== Rich Vogler ==
On July 21, 1990, during the Joe James / Pat O'Connor Memorial sprint car event, which was nationally broadcast on ESPN Thunder, sprint car driver Rich Vogler sustained fatal head injuries due to a crash in turn 4. Vogler, who was leading the event and about to take the white flag signaling one lap to go, struck the turn 4 wall virtually head-on. The race was red flagged and declared finished. Vogler, 39, was declared the winner posthumously because of USAC National Sprint Car Series rules on a red flag reverting to the previous completed lap. This was his 170th win. Finishing second was Jeff Gordon.
