= Brett Butler (racing driver) =

American racing driver (born 1985)

- Born: April 10, 1985 (age 41); Lilburn, Georgia, U.S.

NASCAR O'Reilly Auto Parts Series career
- 3 races run over 1 year
- 2013 position: 68th
- Best finish: 68th (2013)
- First race: 2013 CNBC Prime's "The Profit" 200 (Loudon)
- Last race: 2013 Dollar General 300 (Chicago)
Wins	Top tens	Poles
0	0	0

NASCAR FedEx Freight Truck Series career
- 19 races run over 2 years
- Best finish: 22nd (2010)
- First race: 2009 Kroger 250 (Martinsville)
- Last race: 2010 Too Tough To Tame 200 (Darlington)
Wins	Top tens	Poles
0	0	0
- Statistics up to date as of November 16, 2013.

Brett Butler (born April 10, 1985) is an American NASCAR driver who most recently ran in the Camping World Truck Series. He is the younger brother of driver Ken Butler III, and the son of Aaron's, Inc. president Ken Butler.

== Early career ==
Butler graduated from Parkview High School where he was a star wrestler. At the age of 15, he started his racing career by running go-karts along with his brother Ken. In 2003 and 2004, he ran in the Aaron's Pro Challenge series, accumulating 22 top-tens and two poles. For 2005, Butler ran part-time in the Dodge Weekly Racing Series at Hickory Motor Speedway. He earned three top-tens and finished 12th in points.

== Driver development program ==
Around this time, Butler signed with Michael Waltrip Racing as part of their driver development program. In 2006, he began running in the Hooters USAR Pro Cup Series. He ran the entire season in their Southern Division and finished 21st in points with one top-ten. He finished second in both Rookie of the Year and Most Popular Driver Standings. In 2007, he ran selected Pro Cup races and also made his ARCA series debut by running two races with Aaron's sponsorship. In 2008, Butler returned to running full-time in Pro Cup, this time in their Northern Division.

== Camping World Truck Series ==
In 2009, Butler made his debut in the Truck Series at Martinsville Speedway in March, driving the No. 47 Chevrolet for Fast Track Racing Enterprises. He started in the 36th position and finished 26th. He would run three more races that season with a best finish of 20th at Martinsville in October in a No. 99 Chevrolet owned by Dwayne Tatman.

For 2010, Butler was tabbed by Rick Ware Racing to drive the full season for their newly created Truck Series team in the No. 47 Fuel Doctor Chevrolet. At Daytona International Speedway, in his first race with the team, Butler earned rookie of the race honors by finishing 11th and leading one lap. This would be the high point for Butler's season with him only garnering two more top-20 finishes over the next 13 races. After the August race at Nashville Superspeedway, Butler was removed from the No. 47. He ran the next race at Darlington Raceway in the No. 6 Chevrolet, parking after just 19 laps. This would be his last appearance of the 2010 season.

== Return to NASCAR ==
In 2013 Butler returned to NASCAR competition, driving for SR² Motorsports in the Nationwide Series part-time.

== Motorsports career results ==
=== NASCAR ===
(key) (Bold – Pole position awarded by qualifying time. Italics – Pole position earned by points standings or practice time. * – Most laps led.)

==== Nationwide Series ====
NASCAR Nationwide Series results
Year	Team	No.	Make	1	2	3	4	5	6	7	8	9	10	11	12	13	14	15	16	17	18	19	20	21	22	23	24	25	26	27	28	29	30	31	32	33	NNSC	Pts	Ref
2013	SR² Motorsports	24	Toyota	DAY	PHO	LVS	BRI	CAL	TEX	RCH	TAL	DAR	CHA	DOV	IOW	MCH	ROA	KEN	DAY	NHA; 36	CHI	IND	IOW; 33	GLN	LEX	BRI	ATL		CHI; 34	KEN	DOV	KAN	CHA	TEX	PHO	HOM	68th	29	
2013	SR² Motorsports	00	Toyota																									RCH; DNQ									68th	29	

==== Camping World Truck Series ====
NASCAR Camping World Truck Series results
Year	Team	No.	Make	1	2	3	4	5	6	7	8	9	10	11	12	13	14	15	16	17	18	19	20	21	22	23	24	25	NCWTC	Pts	Ref
2009	Fast Track Racing	47	Chevy	DAY	CAL	ATL	MAR; 26	KAN	CLT	DOV	TEX	MCH	MLW	MEM	KEN	IRP	NSH												59th	279	
2009	Tatman Racing	99	Chevy															BRI; 24	CHI	IOW	GTW	NHA	LVS	MAR; 20	TAL	TEX	PHO		59th	279	
2009	SS-Green Light Racing	08	Chevy																									HOM; 24	59th	279	
2010	Rick Ware Racing	47	Chevy	DAY; 11	ATL; 23	MAR; 25	NSH; 32	KAN; 26	DOV; 28	CLT; 22	TEX; 19	MCH; 24	IOW; 18	GTY; 21	IRP; 21	POC; 23	NSH; 25												22nd	1409	
2010	Rick Ware Racing	6	Chevy															DAR; 29	BRI	CHI	KEN	NHA	LVS	MAR	TAL	TEX	PHO	HOM	22nd	1409	

^{*} Season still in progress
^{1} Ineligible for series points
