= 2010 NASCAR Camping World Truck Series =

American motorsport season

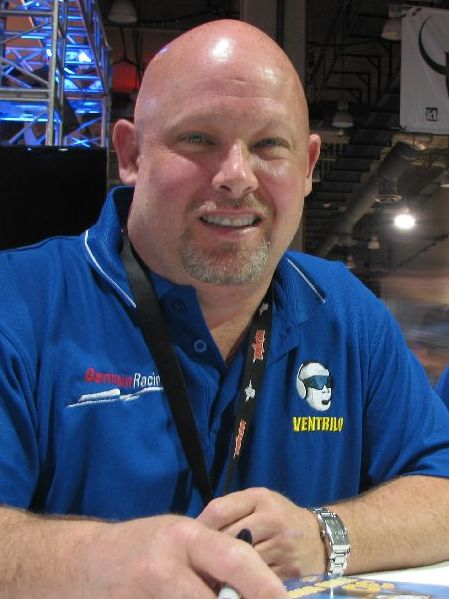
Todd Bodine, the 2010 Camping World Truck Series champion.

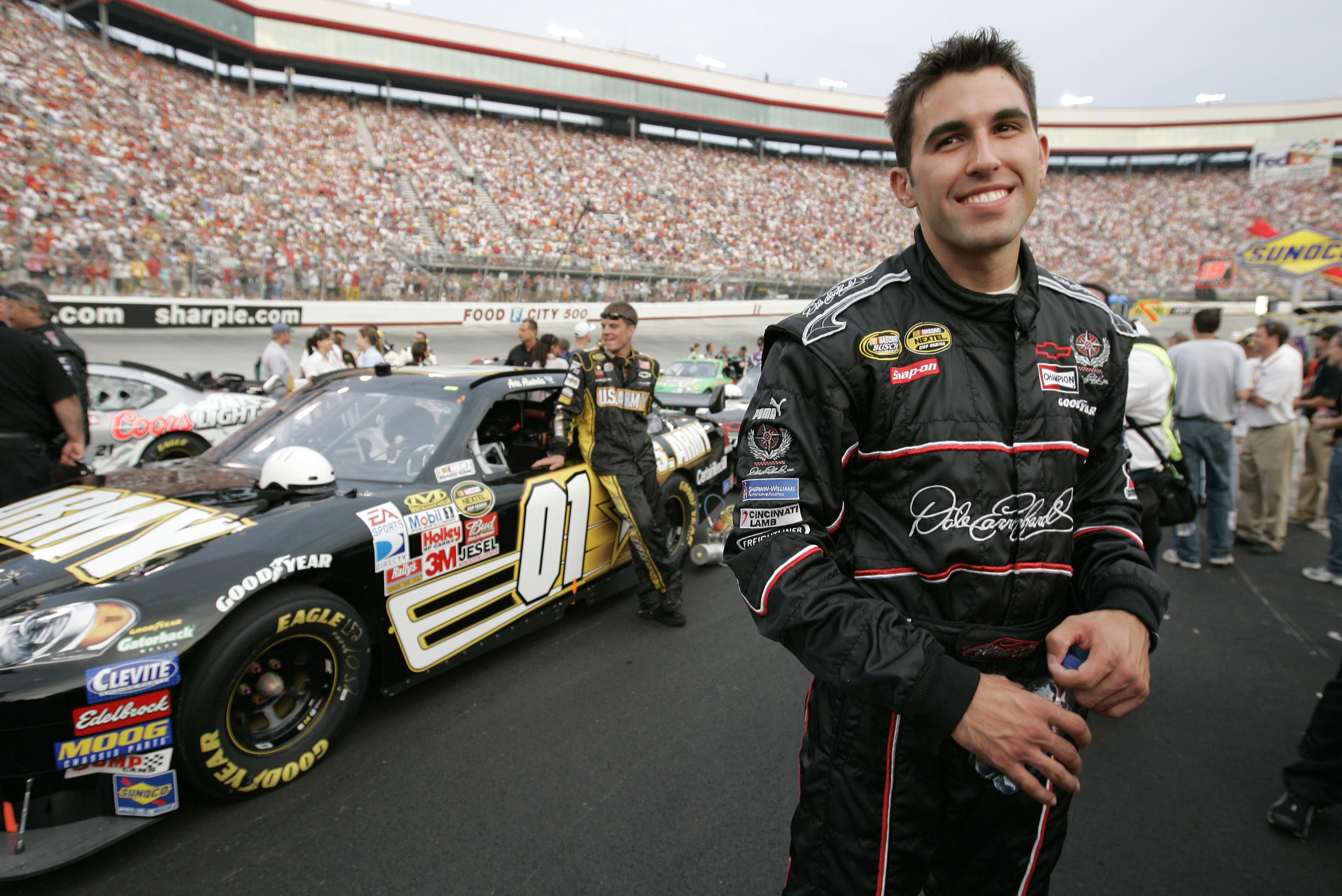
Aric Almirola came in second behind Bodine by 207 points.

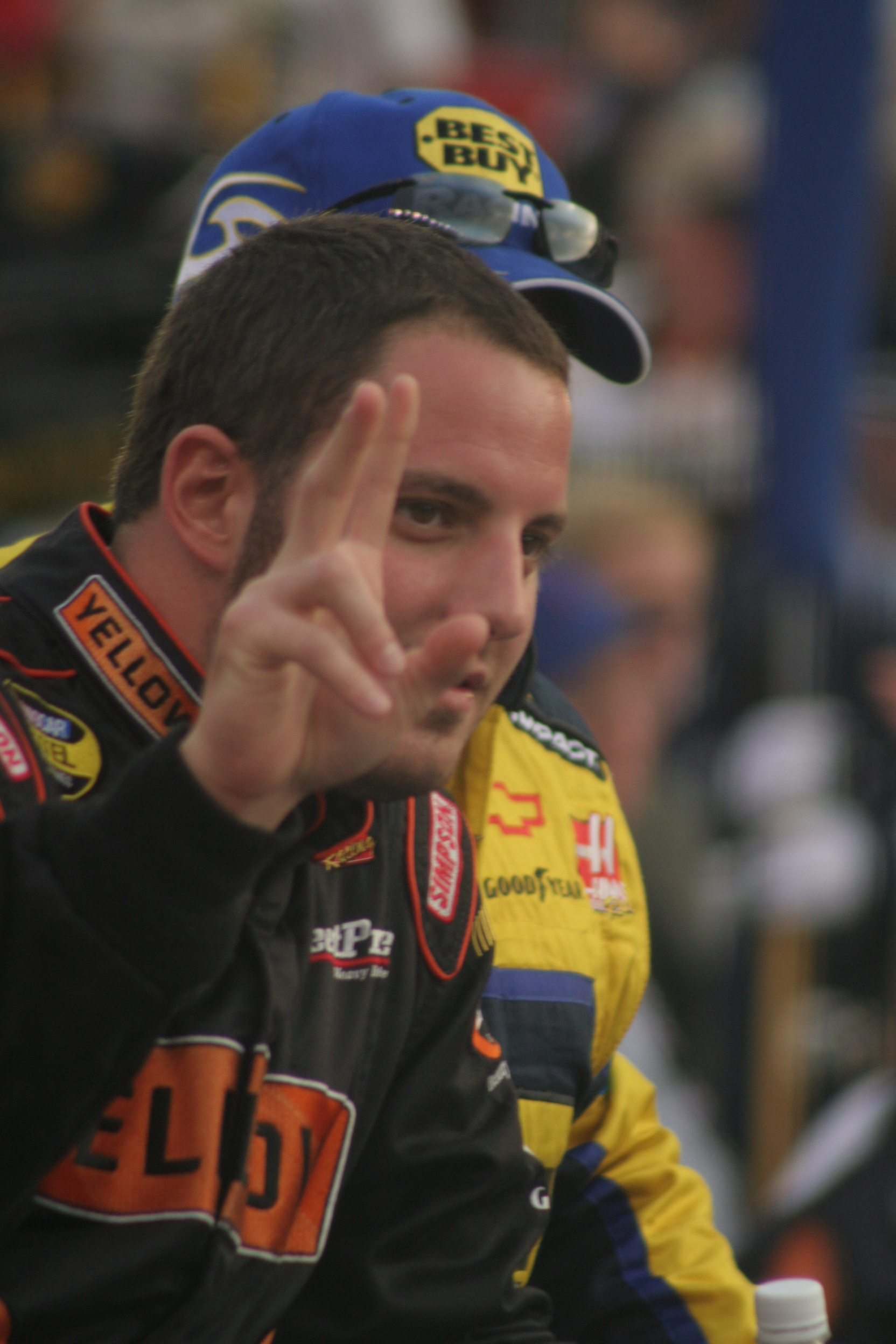
Johnny Sauter finished third in the championship.

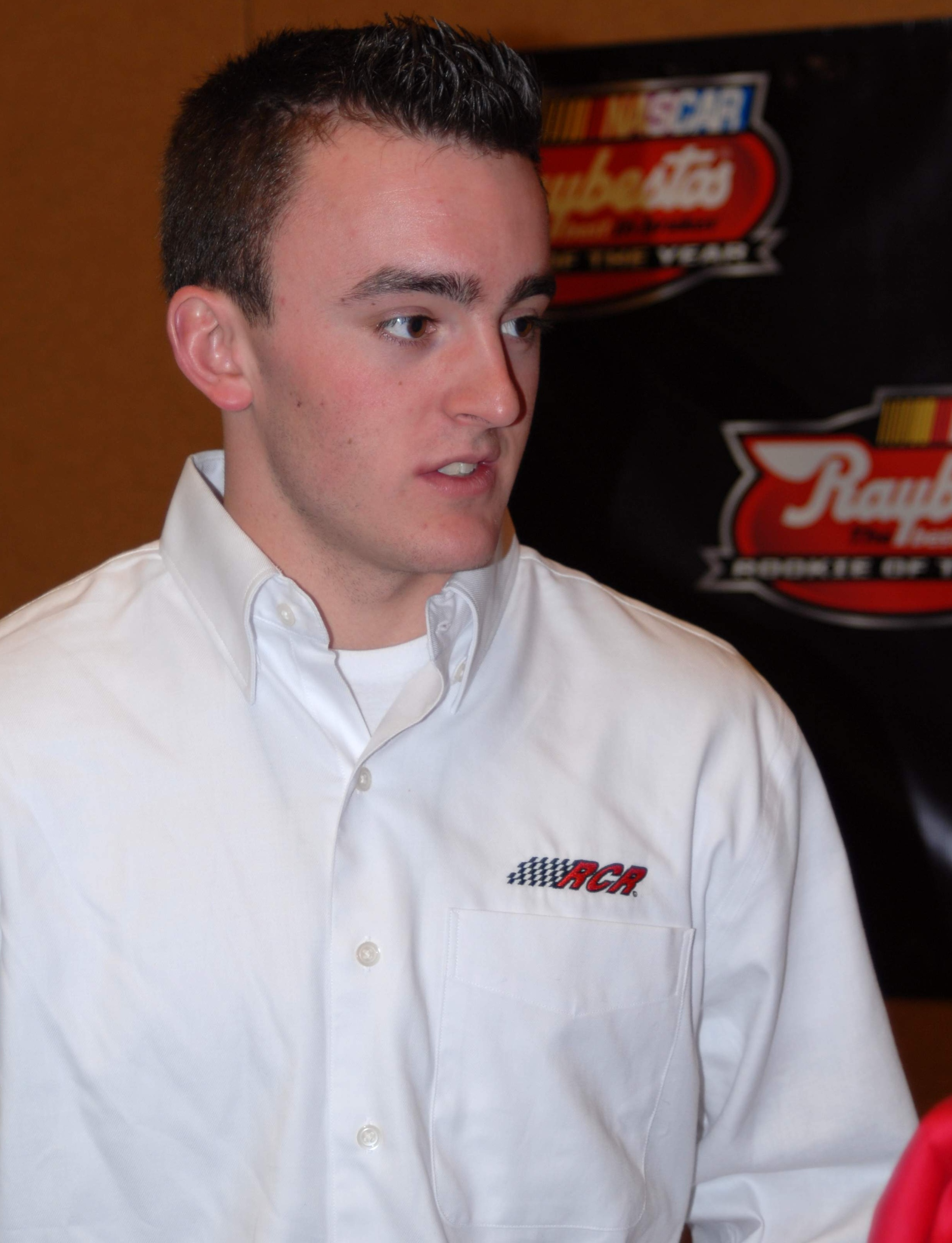
Austin Dillon, the Camping World Truck Series Rookie of the Year.

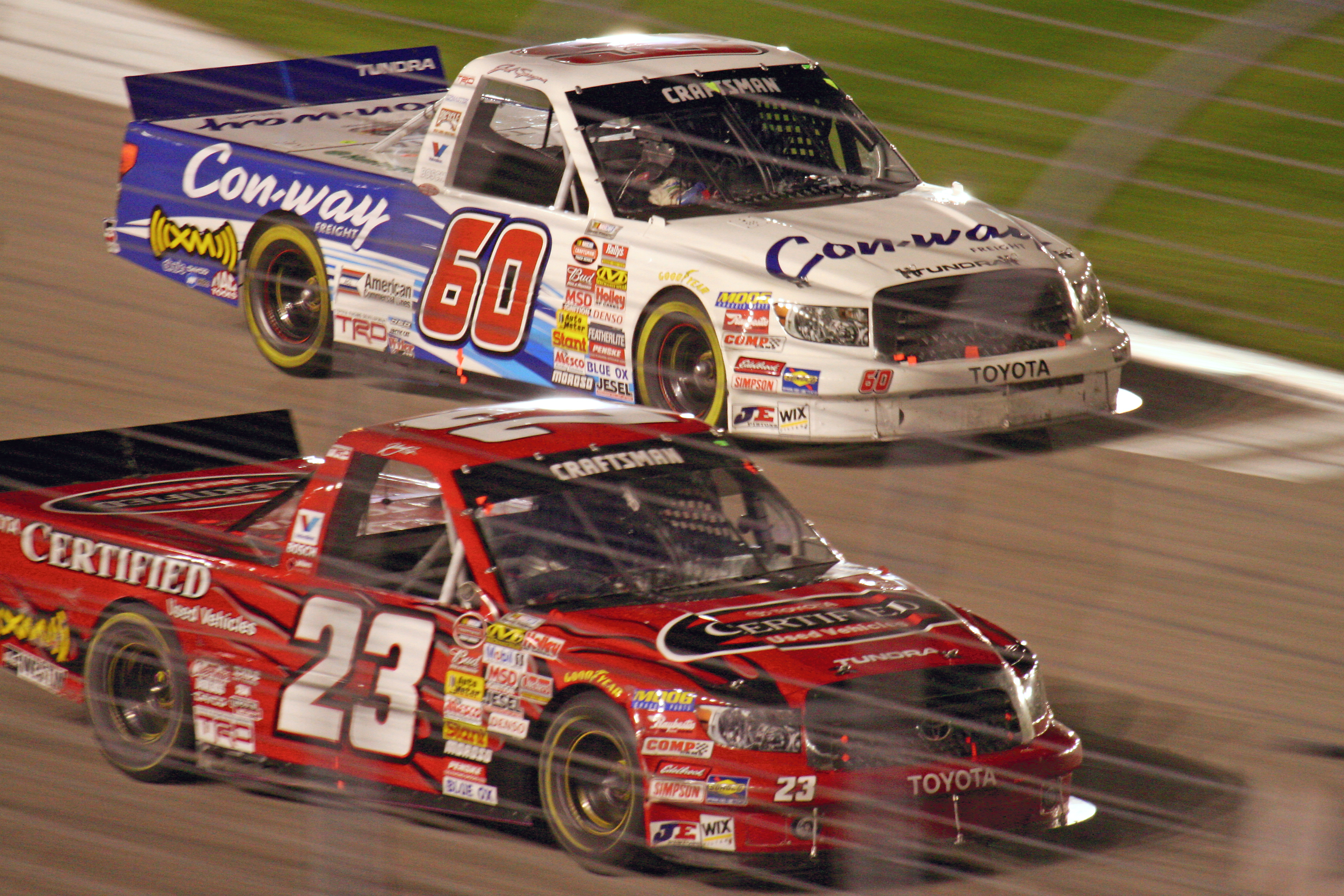
Toyota won their fifth consecutive manufacturers' championship with 193 points and 15 wins.

The 2010 NASCAR Camping World Truck Series was the sixteenth season of the NASCAR Camping World Truck Series, a pickup truck racing series sanctioned and run by NASCAR. Beginning at Daytona International Speedway, the season included twenty-five races, which ended with the Ford 200 at Homestead–Miami Speedway. During the 2009 off season, NASCAR announced few calendar changes, returning to Darlington Raceway for the first time in six years. Kyle Busch Motorsports won the owners' championship in their inaugural season, while Todd Bodine won the drivers' championship during the Lucas Oil 150 at Phoenix International Raceway, one race before the final. Toyota won the manufacturers' championship with 193 points.

== 2010 teams and drivers ==
=== Complete schedule ===
Manufacturer	Team	No.	Driver(s)	Crew chief
Chevrolet	DGM Racing	12	Mario Gosselin	George Church 5 Thomas Buzze 20
Chevrolet	Kevin Harvick, Inc.	2	Elliott Sadler 8	Doug George 1 Ernie Cope 6 Butch Hylton 17; David Hyder 1
Chevrolet	Kevin Harvick, Inc.	2	Kevin Harvick 6	Doug George 1 Ernie Cope 6 Butch Hylton 17; David Hyder 1
Chevrolet	Kevin Harvick, Inc.	2	Ken Schrader 7	Doug George 1 Ernie Cope 6 Butch Hylton 17; David Hyder 1
Chevrolet	Kevin Harvick, Inc.	2	Shelby Howard 3	Doug George 1 Ernie Cope 6 Butch Hylton 17; David Hyder 1
Chevrolet	Kevin Harvick, Inc.	2	Clint Bowyer 1	Doug George 1 Ernie Cope 6 Butch Hylton 17; David Hyder 1
Chevrolet	Kevin Harvick, Inc.	33	Ron Hornaday Jr.	Dave Fuge 1 Doug George 9 Butch Hylton 6 Ernie Cope 1 Kevin Buskirk 8
Chevrolet	Norm Benning Racing	57	Norm Benning	Billy Wheeler 2 James Dugger 23
Chevrolet	Richard Childress Racing	3	Austin Dillon (R)	Danny Stockman Jr.
Chevrolet	Rick Ware Racing	47	Brett Butler (R) 14	Gary Cogswell
Chevrolet	Rick Ware Racing	47	Lance Fenton 2	Gary Cogswell
Chevrolet	Rick Ware Racing	47	Bobby Hamilton Jr. 4	Gary Cogswell
Chevrolet	Rick Ware Racing	47	Jeffrey Earnhardt 3	Gary Cogswell
Chevrolet	Rick Ware Racing	47	C. E. Falk 1	Gary Cogswell
Chevrolet	Rick Ware Racing	47	Donnie Neuenberger 1	Gary Cogswell
Chevrolet	RSS Racing	39	Ryan Sieg 24	Mike Garvey 9 Kris Nicholson 16
Chevrolet	RSS Racing	39	Mike Garvey 1	Mike Garvey 9 Kris Nicholson 16
Chevrolet	RSS Racing	93	Shane Sieg 9	Tony Wilson
Chevrolet	RSS Racing	93	Mike Garvey 15	Tony Wilson
Chevrolet	RSS Racing	93	Ryan Sieg 1	Tony Wilson
Chevrolet	ThorSport Racing	13	Johnny Sauter	Joe Shear Jr.
Chevrolet	ThorSport Racing	88	Matt Crafton	Bud Haefele
Chevrolet	Turner Motorsports	4	Ricky Carmichael	Michael Fritts 17; Doug Randolph 8
Ford	Brent Raymer Racing	85	Brent Raymer	Josh Raymer
Ford	Jennifer Jo Cobb Racing	10	Jennifer Jo Cobb (R)	Rudy Prickler 5 Steve Kuykendall 20
Toyota	Billy Ballew Motorsports	51	Aric Almirola	Richie Wauters
Toyota	Germain Racing	30	Todd Bodine	Mike Hillman Jr.
Toyota	Kyle Busch Motorsports	18	Kyle Busch 16	Eric Phillips
Toyota	Kyle Busch Motorsports	18	Brian Ickler 7	Eric Phillips
Toyota	Kyle Busch Motorsports	18	Johnny Benson 1	Eric Phillips
Toyota	Kyle Busch Motorsports	18	Kasey Kahne 1	Eric Phillips
Toyota	Randy Moss Motorsports with HTM	5	Mike Skinner	Gene Nead 7 Stacy Johnson 18
Toyota	Randy Moss Motorsports with HTM 16; SS-Green Light Racing 9	81	David Starr	Doug Wolcott 16; Jason Miller 9
Toyota	Red Horse Racing	7	Justin Lofton (R)	Mark Rette
Toyota	Red Horse Racing	17	Timothy Peters	Jeff Hensley
Chevrolet Dodge	Rick Ware Racing	6	Donnie Neuenberger 5	Kevin Heins; Mike Cluka
Chevrolet Dodge	Rick Ware Racing	6	D. J. Kennington 1	Kevin Heins; Mike Cluka
Chevrolet Dodge	Rick Ware Racing	6	Brian Rose 2	Kevin Heins; Mike Cluka
Chevrolet Dodge	Rick Ware Racing	6	J. C. Stout 2	Kevin Heins; Mike Cluka
Chevrolet Dodge	Rick Ware Racing	6	Michael Guerity 1	Kevin Heins; Mike Cluka
Chevrolet Dodge	Rick Ware Racing	6	Jeffrey Earnhardt 2	Kevin Heins; Mike Cluka
Chevrolet Dodge	Rick Ware Racing	6	Ryan Rust 1	Kevin Heins; Mike Cluka
Chevrolet Dodge	Rick Ware Racing	6	Bobby Hamilton Jr. 2	Kevin Heins; Mike Cluka
Chevrolet Dodge	Rick Ware Racing	6	Brett Butler (R) 1	Kevin Heins; Mike Cluka
Chevrolet Dodge	Rick Ware Racing	6	Clay Greenfield 1	Kevin Heins; Mike Cluka
Chevrolet Dodge	Rick Ware Racing	6	Ken Butler III 1	Kevin Heins; Mike Cluka
Chevrolet Dodge	Rick Ware Racing	6	Carl Long 1	Kevin Heins; Mike Cluka
Chevrolet Dodge	Rick Ware Racing	6	Lance Fenton 2	Kevin Heins; Mike Cluka
Chevrolet Dodge	Rick Ware Racing	6	Amber Cope 1	Kevin Heins; Mike Cluka
Chevrolet Dodge	Rick Ware Racing	6	C. E. Falk 1	Kevin Heins; Mike Cluka
Chevrolet Dodge	Rick Ware Racing	6	Derek White 1	Kevin Heins; Mike Cluka
Chevrolet Dodge Ford	Lafferty Motorsports; Mike Harmon Racing	89	Wayne Edwards 1	Chris Lafferty 6 Calvin Wood 13; Dan Kolanda 3 Scott Kazura 3
Chevrolet Dodge Ford	Lafferty Motorsports; Mike Harmon Racing	89	Mike Harmon 15	Chris Lafferty 6 Calvin Wood 13; Dan Kolanda 3 Scott Kazura 3
Chevrolet Dodge Ford	Lafferty Motorsports; Mike Harmon Racing	89	Chris Lafferty 9	Chris Lafferty 6 Calvin Wood 13; Dan Kolanda 3 Scott Kazura 3
Chevrolet Toyota	Wyler Racing	60	Stacy Compton 15	Chad Kendrick 22; Marcus Richmond 3
Chevrolet Toyota	Wyler Racing	60	Narain Karthikeyan (R) 9	Chad Kendrick 22; Marcus Richmond 3
Chevrolet Toyota	Wyler Racing	60	Cole Whitt 1	Chad Kendrick 22; Marcus Richmond 3
Chevrolet Dodge Ford Toyota	SS-Green Light Racing	07	Sean Murphy 1	Jason Miller; Mike Davis; Troy Smith; Butch Miller
Chevrolet Dodge Ford Toyota	SS-Green Light Racing	07	Donny Lia 9	Jason Miller; Mike Davis; Troy Smith; Butch Miller
Chevrolet Dodge Ford Toyota	SS-Green Light Racing	07	Tony Jackson Jr. (R) 7	Jason Miller; Mike Davis; Troy Smith; Butch Miller
Chevrolet Dodge Ford Toyota	SS-Green Light Racing	07	Butch Miller 6	Jason Miller; Mike Davis; Troy Smith; Butch Miller
Chevrolet Dodge Ford Toyota	SS-Green Light Racing	07	John King 2	Jason Miller; Mike Davis; Troy Smith; Butch Miller
Chevrolet Dodge Ford Toyota	SS-Green Light Racing	23	Jason White	Doug Howe
Dodge Ford Toyota	Team Gill Racing 21; Eddie Sharp Racing 4	46	Dennis Setzer 2	Joey Jones
Dodge Ford Toyota	Team Gill Racing 21; Eddie Sharp Racing 4	46	Clay Greenfield 6	Joey Jones
Dodge Ford Toyota	Team Gill Racing 21; Eddie Sharp Racing 4	46	Willie Allen 1	Joey Jones
Dodge Ford Toyota	Team Gill Racing 21; Eddie Sharp Racing 4	46	Terry Jones 3	Joey Jones
Dodge Ford Toyota	Team Gill Racing 21; Eddie Sharp Racing 4	46	Brian Rose 2	Joey Jones
Dodge Ford Toyota	Team Gill Racing 21; Eddie Sharp Racing 4	46	Chase Austin 1	Joey Jones
Dodge Ford Toyota	Team Gill Racing 21; Eddie Sharp Racing 4	46	J. C. Stout 3	Joey Jones
Dodge Ford Toyota	Team Gill Racing 21; Eddie Sharp Racing 4	46	Tim Andrews 1	Joey Jones
Dodge Ford Toyota	Team Gill Racing 21; Eddie Sharp Racing 4	46	John King 2	Joey Jones
Dodge Ford Toyota	Team Gill Racing 21; Eddie Sharp Racing 4	46	Craig Goess 2	Joey Jones
Dodge Ford Toyota	Team Gill Racing 21; Eddie Sharp Racing 4	46	Jason Bowles 1	Joey Jones
Dodge Ford Toyota	Team Gill Racing 21; Eddie Sharp Racing 4	46	Steve Park 1	Joey Jones

Notes:

- Cobb's team purchased the equipment and owner points from the Circle Bar Racing No. 10 truck.
- Kyle Busch purchased the assets of Xpress Motorsports and used their owner points from 2009 (from the No. 16 truck).
- RCR purchased the No. 48 Fast Track truck's owner points from 2009 for the No. 3 truck.
- Rick Ware Racing purchased the owner points from the former No. 08 SS-Green Light truck for the No. 47 truck.
- Carmichael's No. 4 team purchased the owner points from the championship-winning No. 33 Kevin Harvick, Inc. truck in 2009.

=== Part-time schedule ===
Manufacturer	Team	No.	Driver(s)	Crew chief	Rounds
Chevrolet	B. J. McLeod Motorsports	9	B. J. McLeod	Jamie Jones	1
Chevrolet	Brackett Family Motorsports	06	Dale Brackett	Shane Romanoski 1 Joseph Decker 2	2
Chevrolet	Brackett Family Motorsports	06	Tim Bainey Jr.	Shane Romanoski 1 Joseph Decker 2	1
Chevrolet	Brad Queen Racing	00	Brad Queen	???	1
Chevrolet	Daisy Ramirez Motorsports	00	Carlos Contreras	Micah Horton	1
Chevrolet	Daisy Ramirez Motorsports	00	Jerick Johnson	Mark Janes-O'Rourke 2 Morris Van Vleet 1 Brian Weber 1	1
Chevrolet	Daisy Ramirez Motorsports	00	Carl Long	Mark Janes-O'Rourke 2 Morris Van Vleet 1 Brian Weber 1	1
Chevrolet	Daisy Ramirez Motorsports	00	Brian Weber	Mark Janes-O'Rourke 2 Morris Van Vleet 1 Brian Weber 1	1
Chevrolet	Daisy Ramirez Motorsports	00	Dominick Casola	Mark Janes-O'Rourke 2 Morris Van Vleet 1 Brian Weber 1	1
Chevrolet	Derek White Racing	96	Derek White	Robert Bosisio	1
Chevrolet	DGM Racing	72	Caitlin Shaw	Johnny Chapman	1
Chevrolet	DGM Racing	72	Johnny Chapman	Guy Caron 1 Walter Shafer 4	2
Chevrolet	DGM Racing	72	John Jackson	Guy Caron 1 Walter Shafer 4	4
Chevrolet	DGM Racing	99	John Jackson	Guy Caron	1
Chevrolet	Fast Track Racing Enterprises	48	Bryan Silas	Bryant Frazier 2 Jeremy Crandall 1 David McClure 12	2
Chevrolet	Fast Track Racing Enterprises	48	Tim Bainey Jr. (R)	Bryant Frazier 2 Jeremy Crandall 1 David McClure 12	3
Chevrolet	Fast Track Racing Enterprises	48	Hermie Sadler	Bryant Frazier 2 Jeremy Crandall 1 David McClure 12	6
Chevrolet	Fast Track Racing Enterprises	48	Chad McCumbee	Bryant Frazier 2 Jeremy Crandall 1 David McClure 12	1
Chevrolet	Fast Track Racing Enterprises	48	Richard Harriman	Bryant Frazier 2 Jeremy Crandall 1 David McClure 12	1
Chevrolet	Fast Track Racing Enterprises	48	Michelle Theriault	Bryant Frazier 2 Jeremy Crandall 1 David McClure 12	2
Chevrolet	Fast Track Racing Enterprises	49	Chad McCumbee	David McClure	2
Chevrolet	Fast Track Racing Enterprises	49	Michelle Theriault	David McClure	1
Chevrolet	FDNY Racing	28	L. W. Miller	Dick Rahilly	1
Chevrolet	FDNY Racing	28	Wayne Edwards	Dick Rahilly	1
Chevrolet	FDNY Racing	28	Chad McCumbee	Dick Rahilly	1
Chevrolet	FDNY Racing	28	Andy Lally	Dick Rahilly	1
Chevrolet	Gene Price Motorsports	62	Greg Pursley	Jerry Pitts	3
Chevrolet	Green Burton Motorsports	16	Wes Burton	Tim Andrews 1 Tim Jenkins 2 Nathan Chea 1	4
Chevrolet	Jimmy Dick Racing	86	Jamie Dick	Michael Naake	7
Chevrolet	Ken Schrader Racing	52	Ken Schrader	Donnie Richeson	2
Chevrolet	LCS Motorsports	87	Chris Jones	Kyle Johnson 3 Mark Parks 3 Richard Kahlich 7 Jason Dawson 2	15
Chevrolet	RBR Enterprises	92	Dennis Setzer	Michael Hester	9
Chevrolet	Richard Childress Racing	22	Tim George Jr.	Gere Kennon Jr.	1
Chevrolet	Rick Ware Racing	16	Donnie Neuenberger	Dave Mitchell; Rick Ware; Mike Cluka	1
Chevrolet	Rick Ware Racing	16	J. C. Stout	Dave Mitchell; Rick Ware; Mike Cluka	3
Chevrolet	Rick Ware Racing	16	Justin Hobgood	Dave Mitchell; Rick Ware; Mike Cluka	2
Chevrolet	Rick Ware Racing	16	Travis Kvapil	Dave Mitchell; Rick Ware; Mike Cluka	1
Chevrolet	Rodenbeck Racing	82	Paddy Rodenbeck	Jeffery Caudill	5
Chevrolet	Steve McGowan Motorsports	19	David Mayhew	Terry Henry	3
Chevrolet	Tagsby Racing	65	Wayne Edwards	Kelly Frankum	1
Chevrolet	Tagsby Racing	65	Chris Fontaine	Kelly Frankum	1
Chevrolet	Tagsby Racing	73	Chris Fontaine	Joey Sonntag	2
Chevrolet	Tagsby Racing	73	Rick Crawford	Travis Sharpe	3
Chevrolet	Tagsby Racing	73	Brian Johnson Jr.	Travis Sharpe	1
Chevrolet	ThorSport Racing	98	Landon Cassill	Lance Hooper	1
Chevrolet	Turner Motorsports	31	James Buescher	Michael Shelton	21
Chevrolet	William Bishop Motorsports	53	Justin Hobgood	Robert Bentley	2
Chevrolet	Wyler Racing	64	Chase Mattioli	Stacy Compton	1
Chevrolet	Wyler Racing	64	Peyton Sellers	Marcus Richmond	1
Chevrolet	MAKE Motorsports	50	T. J. Bell	Andy Cody 1 Scott Weaver 4	3
Dodge	MAKE Motorsports	50	G. R. Smith	Andy Cody 1 Scott Weaver 4	2
Dodge	Brad Keselowski Racing	29	Brad Keselowski	Wayne Setterington Jr.	4
Dodge	Brad Keselowski Racing	29	Parker Kligerman	Wayne Setterington Jr.	1
Dodge	Stratus Racing Group	74	Derrike Cope	Del Markle 1 Rick Markle 1	2
Ford	Circle Bar Racing	14	Rick Crawford	Blake Bainbridge 2 Scott Weaver 2	4
Ford	Grimm Racing	71	Eddie MacDonald	Rollie Lachance Jr.	1
Ford	Kimmel Racing	44	Will Kimmel	Bill Kimmel Jr.	1
Ford	MB Motorsports	63	Jack Smith	Mike Mittler	3
Ford	MB Motorsports	63	Nick Hoffman	Mike Mittler	1
Ford	Ray Hackett Racing	75	Chris Jones	Ray Hackett	1
Ford	Ray Hackett Racing	76	Ryan Hackett	Travis Sharpe 5 Curtis Martin Jr. 1	3
Ford	Ray Hackett Racing	76	Brian Johnson Jr.	Travis Sharpe 5 Curtis Martin Jr. 1	2
Ford	Ray Hackett Racing	76	Rick Crawford	Travis Sharpe 5 Curtis Martin Jr. 1	1
Ford	Robbie Brand Racing	37	Robbie Brand	Roger Gordon	2
Toyota	Billy Ballew Motorsports	15	Ted Musgrave	Kevin Starland	1
Toyota	Billy Ballew Motorsports	15	Steve Wallace	Kevin Starland	4
Toyota	Billy Ballew Motorsports	15	Johnny Benson	Kevin Starland	3
Toyota	Billy Ballew Motorsports	15	Nelson Piquet Jr.	Kevin Starland	4
Toyota	Billy Ballew Motorsports	15	Johanna Long	Kevin Starland	3
Toyota	Billy Ballew Motorsports	15	Denny Hamlin	Kevin Starland	1
Toyota	Billy Ballew Motorsports	15	Jason Bowles	Cody Glick	1
Toyota	Germain Racing	9	Max Papis	Brian MacDonald 2 Randy Barnette 1 Bootie Barker 3 Rich Simon 1 Chad Kendrick 2	8
Toyota	Germain Racing	9	Justin Hobgood	Brian MacDonald 2 Randy Barnette 1 Bootie Barker 3 Rich Simon 1 Chad Kendrick 2	1
Toyota	Germain Racing	9	Tom Hessert III	John Monsam	1
Toyota	Germain Racing	77	Tom Hessert III	John Monsam	1
Toyota	Germain Racing	77	Miguel Paludo	Jamie Jones	2
Toyota	Germain Racing	77	Jason Bowles	Rich Simon	1
Toyota	Kyle Busch Motorsports	56	Tayler Malsam	Dan Stillman	7
Toyota	Matt Lofton Motorsports	97	Matt Lofton	Blake Bainbridge	1
Toyota	Panhandle Motorsports	20	Johanna Long	Kevin Starland	4
Toyota	Randy Moss Motorsports with HTM	25	Tayler Malsam	Doug Wolcott 1 Dan Stillman 3	4
Toyota	Red Horse Racing	1	Nelson Piquet Jr.	Rick Gay	1
Toyota	Red Horse Racing	11	Miguel Paludo	Rick Gay	2
Toyota	Sharp-Hartman Racing	41	Steve Park	Jefferson Hodges	2
Chevrolet Dodge Ford	Daisy Ramirez Motorsports	01	J. J. Yeley	Dan Glauz 2 Micah Horton 1 Morris Van Vleet 10; Mark Janes-O'Rourke 3	1
Chevrolet Dodge Ford	Daisy Ramirez Motorsports	01	Carl Long	Dan Glauz 2 Micah Horton 1 Morris Van Vleet 10; Mark Janes-O'Rourke 3	7
Chevrolet Dodge Ford	Daisy Ramirez Motorsports	01	Mike Harmon	Dan Glauz 2 Micah Horton 1 Morris Van Vleet 10; Mark Janes-O'Rourke 3	1
Chevrolet Dodge Ford	Daisy Ramirez Motorsports	01	Dillon Oliver (R)	Dan Glauz 2 Micah Horton 1 Morris Van Vleet 10; Mark Janes-O'Rourke 3	1
Chevrolet Dodge Ford	Daisy Ramirez Motorsports	01	Michael Guerity	Dan Glauz 2 Micah Horton 1 Morris Van Vleet 10; Mark Janes-O'Rourke 3	2
Chevrolet Dodge Ford	Daisy Ramirez Motorsports	01	Joe Aramendia	Dan Glauz 2 Micah Horton 1 Morris Van Vleet 10; Mark Janes-O'Rourke 3	4
Chevrolet Dodge Ford	Daisy Ramirez Motorsports	01	Jeremy Petty	Dan Glauz 2 Micah Horton 1 Morris Van Vleet 10; Mark Janes-O'Rourke 3	1
Chevrolet Dodge Ford	Daisy Ramirez Motorsports	01	Jerick Johnson	Dan Glauz 2 Micah Horton 1 Morris Van Vleet 10; Mark Janes-O'Rourke 3	2
Chevrolet Dodge Ford	Daisy Ramirez Motorsports	01	Chris Lafferty	Dan Glauz 2 Micah Horton 1 Morris Van Vleet 10; Mark Janes-O'Rourke 3	1
Chevrolet Dodge Ford	Daisy Ramirez Motorsports	01	Angela Ruch	Dan Glauz 2 Micah Horton 1 Morris Van Vleet 10; Mark Janes-O'Rourke 3	1
Chevrolet Dodge Ford	Daisy Ramirez Motorsports	01	Larry Foyt	Dan Glauz 2 Micah Horton 1 Morris Van Vleet 10; Mark Janes-O'Rourke 3	1
Chevrolet Dodge Ford	Daisy Ramirez Motorsports	01	Brian Weber	Dan Glauz 2 Micah Horton 1 Morris Van Vleet 10; Mark Janes-O'Rourke 3	1
Chevy Dodge	SS-Green Light Racing	21	Donny Lia		3
Chevy Dodge	SS-Green Light Racing	21	Butch Miller		4
Chevy Dodge	SS-Green Light Racing	21	Chris Eggleston		5
Chevy Dodge	SS-Green Light Racing	21	Johnny Chapman		2
Chevy Dodge	SS-Green Light Racing	21	Chad McCumbee		1
Chevy Dodge	SS-Green Light Racing	21	Jake Crum		1
Chevy Dodge	SS-Green Light Racing	21	David Starr		1
Chevrolet Ford	Lafferty Motorsports; Mike Harmon Racing	24	Mike Harmon	Dan Kolanda 5 Calvin Wood 2	4
Chevrolet Ford	Lafferty Motorsports; Mike Harmon Racing	24	Chris Lafferty	Dan Kolanda 5 Calvin Wood 2	2
Chevrolet Ford	Lafferty Motorsports; Mike Harmon Racing	24	Cody Cambensy	Dan Kolanda 5 Calvin Wood 2	1
Chevrolet Ford	Lafferty Motorsports; Mike Harmon Racing	24	Jerick Johnson	Scott Kazura	1
Chevrolet Toyota	Glenden Enterprises	84	Chris Fontaine	Kevin Ingram	7
Chevrolet Toyota	Stringer Motorsports	90	Brad Sweet	Tripp Bruce	9
Chevrolet Toyota	Stringer Motorsports	90	James Buescher	Tripp Bruce	1
Chevrolet Toyota	Stringer Motorsports	90	Jesse Smith	Tripp Bruce	1
Chevrolet Toyota	Stringer Motorsports	90	Donny Lia	Tripp Bruce	3
Dodge Ford	Team Gill Racing	95	Johnny Benson	Andy Quillan	1
Dodge Ford	Team Gill Racing	95	Geoffrey Bodine	Andy Quillan	1
Dodge Ford	Team Gill Racing	95	Lance Fenton	Andy Quillan	2
Dodge Ford	Team Gill Racing	95	Tim Andrews	Andy Quillan	4
Dodge Ford	Team Gill Racing	95	J. C. Stout	Andy Quillan	3
Dodge Ford	Team Gill Racing	95	Terry Jones	Andy Quillan	1
Dodge Ford	Team Gill Racing	95	Clay Greenfield	Andy Quillan	1
Dodge Ford	Team Gill Racing	95	Dennis Setzer	Andy Quillan	1
Dodge Ford	Team Gill Racing	95	Carl Long	Andy Quillan	2
Dodge Ford	Team Gill Racing	95	Dillon Oliver (R)	Andy Quillan	1
Dodge Ford	Team Gill Racing	95	Grant Enfinger	Andy Quillan	1

== Schedule ==
The season marked the return of Darlington Raceway to the schedule for the first time since 2004, replacing the Milwaukee Mile. The series also raced for the first time at Pocono Raceway. After the closing of Memphis Motorsports Park, a second race was added to Nashville Superspeedway on the first of two weekends where the Nationwide and Truck Series raced but the Cup Series had off weekends. Kentucky Speedway's stand-alone date on the July Cup Series off weekend was moved to the Friday night of Labor Day weekend in September, the same weekend that the IndyCar Series had a race there.

All 25 Truck races were aired on TV on Speed, with all of them being broadcast live except for the race at Dover, which was aired on tape delay by three hours (at 8 p.m.) after the race started at 5 p.m. (noted below with an * asterisk). Unlike the Cup and Nationwide Series Motor Racing Network had the radio coverage for all races.

No.	Race title	Track	Date	Start time (et)
1	NextEra Energy Resources 250	Daytona International Speedway	February 13	8 p.m.
2	E-Z-GO 200	Atlanta Motor Speedway	March 6	2 p.m.
3	Kroger 250	Martinsville Speedway	March 27	2 p.m.
4	Nashville 200	Nashville Superspeedway	April 2	8 p.m.
5	O'Reilly Auto Parts 250	Kansas Speedway	May 2	1 p.m.
6	Dover 200	Dover International Speedway	May 14	5 p.m.*
7	North Carolina Education Lottery 200	Charlotte Motor Speedway	May 21	8 p.m.
8	WinStar World Casino 400	Texas Motor Speedway	June 4	8 p.m.
9	VFW 200	Michigan International Speedway	June 12	1:30 p.m.
10	Lucas Oil 200	Iowa Speedway	July 11	1:30 p.m.
11	CampingWorld.com 200	Gateway International Raceway	July 17 (Note: The Gateway race was postponed to Saturday, July 17 as the track had a power outage.)	1:30 p.m.
12	AAA Insurance 200 presented by J. D. Byrider	O'Reilly Raceway Park at Indianapolis	July 23	8 p.m.
13	Pocono Mountains 125	Pocono Raceway	July 31	12:30 p.m.
14	Nashville 200	Nashville Superspeedway	August 7	8:30 p.m.
15	Too Tough To Tame 200	Darlington Raceway	August 14	7:30 p.m.
16	O'Reilly 200	Bristol Motor Speedway	August 18	8 p.m.
17	EnjoyIllinois.com 225	Chicagoland Speedway	August 27	9 p.m.
18	Built Ford Tough 225	Kentucky Speedway	September 3	8 p.m.
19	TheRaceDayRaffleSeries.com 175	New Hampshire Motor Speedway	September 18	2:30 p.m.
20	Smith's Food and Drug Store 350	Las Vegas Motor Speedway	September 25	9 p.m.
21	Kroger 200	Martinsville Speedway	October 23	1 p.m.
22	Mountain Dew 250 fueled by Fred's	Talladega Superspeedway	October 30	3 p.m.
23	WinStar World Casino 350K	Texas Motor Speedway	November 5	8 p.m.
24	Lucas Oil 150	Phoenix International Raceway	November 12	8 p.m.
25	Ford 200	Homestead–Miami Speedway	November 19	8 p.m.

== Results and standings ==
=== Races ===
No.	Race	Pole position	Most laps led	Winning driver	Manufacturer	No.	Winning team
1	NextEra Energy Resources 250	Jason White	Todd Bodine	Timothy Peters	Toyota	17	Red Horse Racing
2	E-Z-GO 200	Ron Hornaday Jr.	Kevin Harvick	Kevin Harvick	Chevrolet	2	Kevin Harvick Inc.
3	Kroger 250	Kevin Harvick	Kevin Harvick	Kevin Harvick	Chevrolet	2	Kevin Harvick Inc.
4	Nashville 200	Kyle Busch	Kyle Busch	Kyle Busch	Toyota	18	Kyle Busch Motorsports
5	O'Reilly Auto Parts 250	Ron Hornaday Jr.	Johnny Sauter	Johnny Sauter	Chevrolet	13	ThorSport Racing
6	Dover 200	Kyle Busch	Kyle Busch	Aric Almirola	Toyota	51	Billy Ballew Motorsports
7	North Carolina Education Lottery 200	Kyle Busch	Kyle Busch	Kyle Busch	Toyota	18	Kyle Busch Motorsports
8	WinStar World Casino 400	Austin Dillon	Todd Bodine	Todd Bodine	Toyota	30	Germain Racing
9	VFW 200	Austin Dillon	Todd Bodine	Aric Almirola	Toyota	51	Billy Ballew Motorsports
10	Lucas Oil 200	Austin Dillon	Austin Dillon	Austin Dillon	Chevrolet	3	Richard Childress Racing
11	CampingWorld.com 200	Kevin Harvick	Kevin Harvick	Kevin Harvick	Chevrolet	2	Kevin Harvick Inc.
12	AAA Insurance 200 presented by J. D. Byrider	Timothy Peters	Ron Hornaday Jr.	Ron Hornaday Jr.	Chevrolet	33	Kevin Harvick Inc.
13	Pocono Mountains 125	Elliott Sadler	Elliott Sadler	Elliott Sadler	Chevrolet	2	Kevin Harvick Inc.
14	Nashville 200	Todd Bodine	Todd Bodine	Todd Bodine	Toyota	30	Germain Racing
15	Too Tough To Tame 200	Timothy Peters	Timothy Peters; Todd Bodine	Todd Bodine	Toyota	30	Germain Racing
16	O'Reilly 200	Kyle Busch	Kyle Busch	Kyle Busch	Toyota	18	Kyle Busch Motorsports
17	EnjoyIllinois.com 225	Todd Bodine	Kyle Busch	Kyle Busch	Toyota	18	Kyle Busch Motorsports
18	Built Ford Tough 225	Austin Dillon	Kyle Busch	Todd Bodine	Toyota	30	Germain Racing
19	TheRaceDayRaffleSeries.com 175	Kyle Busch	Kyle Busch	Kyle Busch	Toyota	18	Kyle Busch Motorsports
20	Smith's Food and Drug Store 350	Austin Dillon	Austin Dillon	Austin Dillon	Chevrolet	3	Richard Childress Racing
21	Kroger 200	Kyle Busch	Todd Bodine	Ron Hornaday Jr.	Chevrolet	33	Kevin Harvick Inc.
22	Mountain Dew 250 fueled by Fred's	Ron Hornaday Jr.	Ron Hornaday Jr.	Kyle Busch	Toyota	18	Kyle Busch Motorsports
23	WinStar World Casino 350K	Matt Crafton	Kyle Busch	Kyle Busch	Toyota	18	Kyle Busch Motorsports
24	Lucas Oil 150	Austin Dillon	Clint Bowyer	Clint Bowyer	Chevrolet	2	Kevin Harvick Inc.
25	Ford 200	Austin Dillon	Kyle Busch	Kyle Busch	Toyota	18	Kyle Busch Motorsports

=== Full Drivers' Championship ===
(key) Bold – Pole position awarded by time. Italics – Pole position set by owner's points. * – Most laps led.

Pos	Driver	DAY	ATL	MAR	NSH	KAN	DOV	CLT	TEX	MCH	IOW	GTY	IRP	POC	NSH	DAR	BRI	CHI	KEN	NHA	LVS	MAR	TAL	TEX	PHO	HOM	Points
1	Todd Bodine	2*	5	30	5	3	5	2	1*	2*	17	4	7	12	**1***	1*	6	**2**	1	9	4	3*	18	4	12	4	3937
2	Aric Almirola	12	3	6	8	7	1	7	12	1	28	8	31	4	3	9	2	6	3	8	6	5	2	7	5	5	3730
3	Johnny Sauter	35	8	15	11	1*	15	12	2	14	2	3	4	14	5	4	11	4	2	7	2	21	3	2	3	3	3676
4	Matt Crafton	5	27	7	6	25	7	11	18	27	3	5	3	3	7	6	10	7	10	4	5	10	4	**3**	4	6	3547
5	Austin Dillon **(R)**	26	10	16	14	6	21	35	**3**	**5**	**1***	7	6	7	2	5	17	9	**9**	5	**1***	16	8	25	**7**	**31**	3379
6	Timothy Peters	1	7	4	4	23	25	10	7	6	27	6	**10**	8	4	**2***	8	21	6	6	26	34	7	12	13	17	3343
7	Ron Hornaday Jr.	27	**34**	2	3	**2**	12	3	9	4	24	26	1*	29	6	3	3	3	29	24	11	1	**21***	32	29	2	3310
8	Mike Skinner	24	14	27	7	8	8	6	4	12	7	10	15	6	11	22	4	23	13	13	24	6	15	8	6	8	3256
9	David Starr	19	15	18	16	10	6	9	16	8	10	13	9	13	14	12	23	10	14	15	12	7	11	15	8	11	3170
10	Jason White	**4**	11	29	19	11	14	8	13	7	23	11	13	10	28	27	36	11	4	14	14	4	9	11	32	23	2979
11	James Buescher				13	16	2	4	6	16	5	12	5	11	16	7	33	12	22	2	3	12	6	6	11	19	2963
12	Justin Lofton **(R)**	18	20	31	20	13	3	15	23	18	15	27	29	5	9	20	5	5	11	11	8	13	33	22	9	7	2948
13	Ricky Carmichael	29	6	10	15	12	4	14	20	15	9	29	14	19	15	24	19	28	5	29	9	9	5	10	27	21	2925
14	Kyle Busch	22	2		**1***		**16***	**1***		3			2				**1***	1*	7*	**1***		2	1	1*	2	1*	2798
15	Ryan Sieg	16	18	24	27	19	9	32	30	22	11	31	25	20	13	11	22	15	8	20	25	11	24	16	20	16	2635
16	Mario Gosselin	23	22	9	21	17	18	20	22	23	12	14	24	15	26	23	18	19	16	17	19	35	34	20	34	35	2479
17	Jennifer Jo Cobb **(R)**	34	21	26	25	28	22	18	14	21	25	20	26	27	19	14	28	22	23	22	21	33	23	24	23	24	2326
18	Norm Benning	25	25	23	31	24	23	24	17	28	22	25	22	28	22	18	25	24	31	26	30	24	30	26	24	32	2188
19	Brent Raymer	DNQ	33	22	34	21	31	33	28	29	29	DNQ	33	16	20	28	21	35	17	19	29	23	31	31	21	30	1907
20	Stacy Compton	7	19		9		13			11	6	19		17		8	34		12	16		8		14	14		1856
21	Donny Lia	30	16		22		19	26		13	26		16	22	12	25	30		18	12	28						1500
22	Brett Butler **(R)**	11	23	25	32	26	28	22	19	24	18	21	21	23	25	29											1409
23	Tayler Malsam	17	13	14	17	22	20	13													13			21	18	10	1265
24	Elliott Sadler	20					24	5		9				**1***			26							5		13	1061
25	Ken Schrader			28		9			5		4				10	10	24				10		14				1060
26	Dennis Setzer	3	29	DNQ	26			30				35	12			16	12		15	18		29					1049
27	Kevin Harvick		1*	1*	2							**1***								3		15					1048
28	Mike Garvey							36	36	31	36	34	35	33	33	32	35	33	34	31	34	36	12				1045
29	Brian Ickler			3		4					13	9			8	21					7						980
30	Narain Karthikeyan			13		36		17	11				20		17			14			27		13				963
31	Brad Sweet		12					21		19		16	8				DNQ	16							15	25	911
32	Rick Crawford	28	9	19	10	31												8			32			17			848
33	Max Papis	21		8			29					15					14						27	23		18	847
34	Mike Harmon		36	35	DNQ	33	34	DNQ	35	34	35	33	34	26	31	15	DNQ	34	DNQ	25			29			DNQ	846
35	J. C. Stout							23	31	36	21	Wth	19	35	32	13		30		36	DNQ						802
36	Chris Jones		DNQ			DNQ	26	DNQ	32	33	33	32	36		29	33	29	32	33		DNQ	28					769
37	Tony Jackson Jr.			20		15			21			18						17			17		26				744
38	Johnny Benson	8		5		5	10		10																		735
39	Clay Greenfield			21							34	28			23		16		24		23	27					716
40	Chris Fontaine		17		28		17		29	17		DNQ		21				13			DNQ		19				714
41	Carl Long		DNQ			27	11	Wth			20	24		36	35		20		26	23	22			Wth			687
42	Bobby Hamilton Jr.													32	24		13			10				13	10		679
43	Butch Miller		32										18	34	18	30			35	32				35	36		657
44	Nelson Piquet Jr.	6						16	8	10											20						644
45	Hermie Sadler			12				19		20							32					14				22	631
46	Donnie Neuenberger	9	24				35		33	25										35			17				609
47	Johanna Long												17		34			20			36	22		36		20	586
48	Jamie Dick					20					16	22						29			DNQ			18	26		585
49	Shane Sieg	DNQ	28	36	35	34	33																	30	33	36	509
50	Brad Keselowski				18			28				2					7										504
51	Chris Eggleston			11	24	30		29			14																496
52	Steve Wallace		4		12						30	17															477
53	Miguel Paludo																9		20					33		9	443
54	Jeffrey Earnhardt											30							28		18		32			26	413
55	Lance Fenton			34	DNQ							Wth				19		25			31			27			407
56	Chris Lafferty			33			36						30		30	31			30	33	DNQ	DNQ		DNQ	35		396
57	John King																15			28		19				27	385
58	Joe Aramendia								24				27	24	21												364
59	Terry Jones					18	27	25		32																	346
60	Chad McCumbee	33	35							30	31			31													340
61	Jack Smith					14			15			23															338
62	Greg Pursley										8										33				17		318
63	Shelby Howard												11					31	19								306
64	Tim Bainey Jr.		31		33									25						27							304
65	Jason Bowles																				16	18		28			303
66	Steve Park																	18	25						19		303
67	Tim Andrews					DNQ	32	Wth						18				36	36								286
68	T. J. Bell							27								26								19			273
69	Craig Goess																						10			12	261
70	Brian Rose				DNQ	32			26		19																258
71	Michael Guerity							31	25	26	Wth																243
72	Wes Burton					35		34														20		34			225
73	Paddy Rodenbeck			DNQ							32		Wth		Wth		DNQ		32					29			210
74	John Jackson															35		DNQ	27				36			34	198
75	Clint Bowyer																								1*		195
76	Ryan Hackett	15	30									DNQ															191
77	Kasey Kahne													2													175
78	Justin Hobgood	DNQ								Wth						34	DNQ				35		16				173
79	C. E. Falk																					25			28		167
80	Jerick Johnson													DNQ			27	26					35				167
81	Bryan Silas	32																					25				155
82	Johnny Chapman						30		27			36						DNQ									155
83	Michelle Theriault												32	DNQ	27												149
84	Tom Hessert III																								31	29	146
85	Denny Hamlin													9													143
86	Brian Johnson Jr.			32	30																					DNQ	140
87	J. J. Yeley	10																									139
88	Parker Kligerman																							9			138
89	Carlos Contreras	14																									126
90	Sean Murphy	13																									124
91	David Mayhew																				15				16	14	123
92	Travis Kvapil																									15	123
93	D. J. Kennington			17																							112
94	Jeremy Petty															17											112
95	B. J. McLeod																					17					112
96	Andy Lally																						20				103
97	Will Kimmel																		21								100
98	Peyton Sellers																			21							100
99	Grant Enfinger																						22				97
100	Tim George Jr.																								22		97
101	Dillon Oliver				23											36											94
102	Nick Hoffman												23														94
103	Geoffrey Bodine		26																								85
104	Amber Cope																					26					85
105	Ken Butler III																	27									82
106	Ryan Rust												28														79
107	Cole Whitt																									28	79
108	Willie Allen				29																						76
109	Jesse Smith					29																					76
110	Eddie MacDonald																			30							73
111	Angela Cope																					30					73
112	Caitlin Shaw																								30		73
113	Ted Musgrave	31																									70
114	Jake Crum																31										70
115	Cody Cambensy																					32					67
116	Derek White					DNQ																				33	64
117	Wayne Edwards	DNQ						DNQ	34																		61
118	Chase Austin									35																	58
119	Landon Cassill	36																									55
120	G. R. Smith				36	DNQ																					55
121	Brian Weber																			34					25		
122	Dominick Casola																						28				
123	Chase Mattioli													30													
124	Matt Lofton																					31					
125	L. W. Miller	DNQ																									
126	Dale Brackett			DNQ									DNQ														
127	Richard Harriman											DNQ															
128	Robbie Brand																				Wth				Wth		
129	Brad Queen																					Wth					
130	Larry Foyt																						Wth				
Pos	Driver	DAY	ATL	MAR	NSH	KAN	DOV	CLT	TEX	MCH	IOW	GTY	IRP	POC	NSH	DAR	BRI	CHI	KEN	NHA	LVS	MAR	TAL	TEX	PHO	HOM	Points

==== Manufacturers ====
Make	Points	Wins
**Toyota**	**193**	**15**
Chevrolet	177	10
Ford	87	0
Dodge	84	0

==== Rookie of the Year ====
The top 4

Driver	Points
**Austin Dillon**	**285**
Justin Lofton	233
Jennifer Jo Cobb	180
Brett Butler	154

== See also ==
- 2010 NASCAR Sprint Cup Series
- 2010 NASCAR Nationwide Series
- 2010 ARCA Racing Series
- 2010 NASCAR Whelen Modified Tour
- 2010 NASCAR Whelen Southern Modified Tour
- 2010 NASCAR Corona Series
- 2010 NASCAR Mini Stock Series
- 2010 NASCAR Canadian Tire Series
