= Ken Butler III =

American racing driver

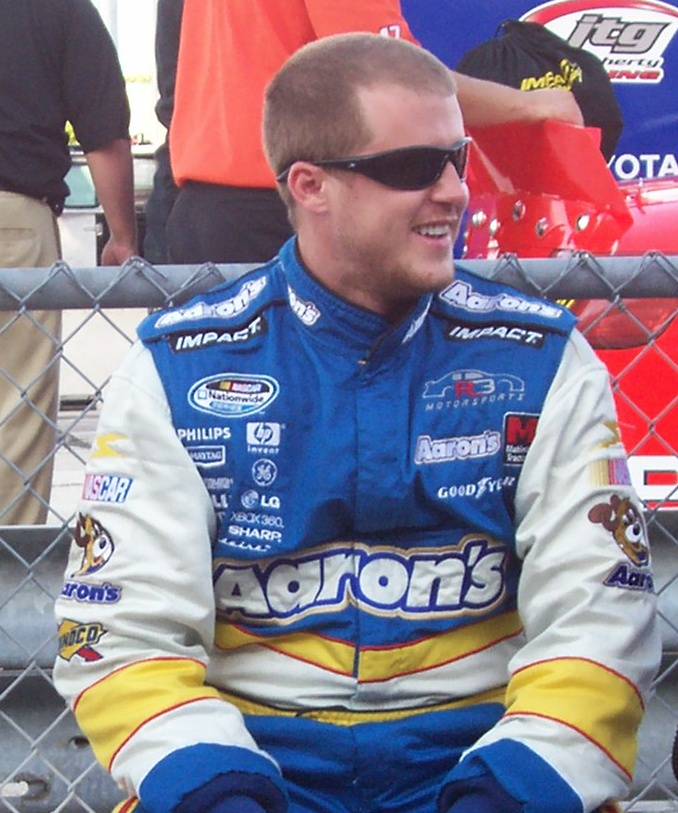
- Butler in 2009
- Born: May 2, 1982 (age 44); Lilburn, Georgia, U.S.

NASCAR O'Reilly Auto Parts Series career
- 25 races run over 2 years
- 2013 position: 46th
- Best finish: 38th (2009)
- First race: 2009 Stater Brothers 300 (Auto Club)
- Last race: 2013 Dollar General 300 (Charlotte)
Wins	Top tens	Poles
0	0	0

NASCAR FedEx Freight Truck Series career
- 3 races run over 2 years
- 2010 position: 105th
- Best finish: 84th (2007)
- First race: 2007 Ohio 250 (Mansfield)
- Last race: 2010 EnjoyIllinois.com 225 (Chicagoland)
Wins	Top tens	Poles
0	0	0
- Statistics up to date as of June 8, 2017.

Ken Butler III (born May 2, 1982) is an American professional stock car racing driver. He is the older brother of Brett Butler and the son of Aaron's president Ken Butler. Butler III has driven in the NASCAR Nationwide Series, Camping World Truck Series, ARCA Racing Series, and the Pro Cup Series.

== Racing career ==
=== Pro Cup Series ===
Butler's interest in racing started when his father took younger brother Brett and Ken to a go-kart race when Ken was eighteen. He took classes at the Richard Petty Driving Experience and Buddy Baker's Speed Tech. Five years later, Butler ran his first season in the Pro Cup Series, recording a best finish of twelfth at Bristol Motor Speedway and finishing seventeenth in points. He ran the following season, 2006, and recorded his first top-ten and top-five. He also failed to qualify for two races that season. He ran a race at South Boston Speedway in 2007 while focusing on the ARCA Racing Series and NASCAR Camping World Truck Series.

=== ARCA Racing Series ===
Butler ran a limited schedule in the 2007 ARCA Re/Max Series with Eddie Sharp Racing as part of its driver development program. He scored his first career victory in only his fourth start, holding off Ken Schrader at Toledo Speedway. However, a damper was put on Bulter's win as he bumped Michael McDowell out of the way in what some, including Schrader, called an unfair move. Continuing to run as part of ESR and Michael Waltrip Racing's development program, he ran along teammates Justin Lofton and Scott Speed. Butler was not victorious at all that year, the only one of three cars on the team to do so. Despite that, he moved up to the NASCAR Nationwide Series for 2009. That year, Butler ran a limited schedule for Andy Belmont but struggled.

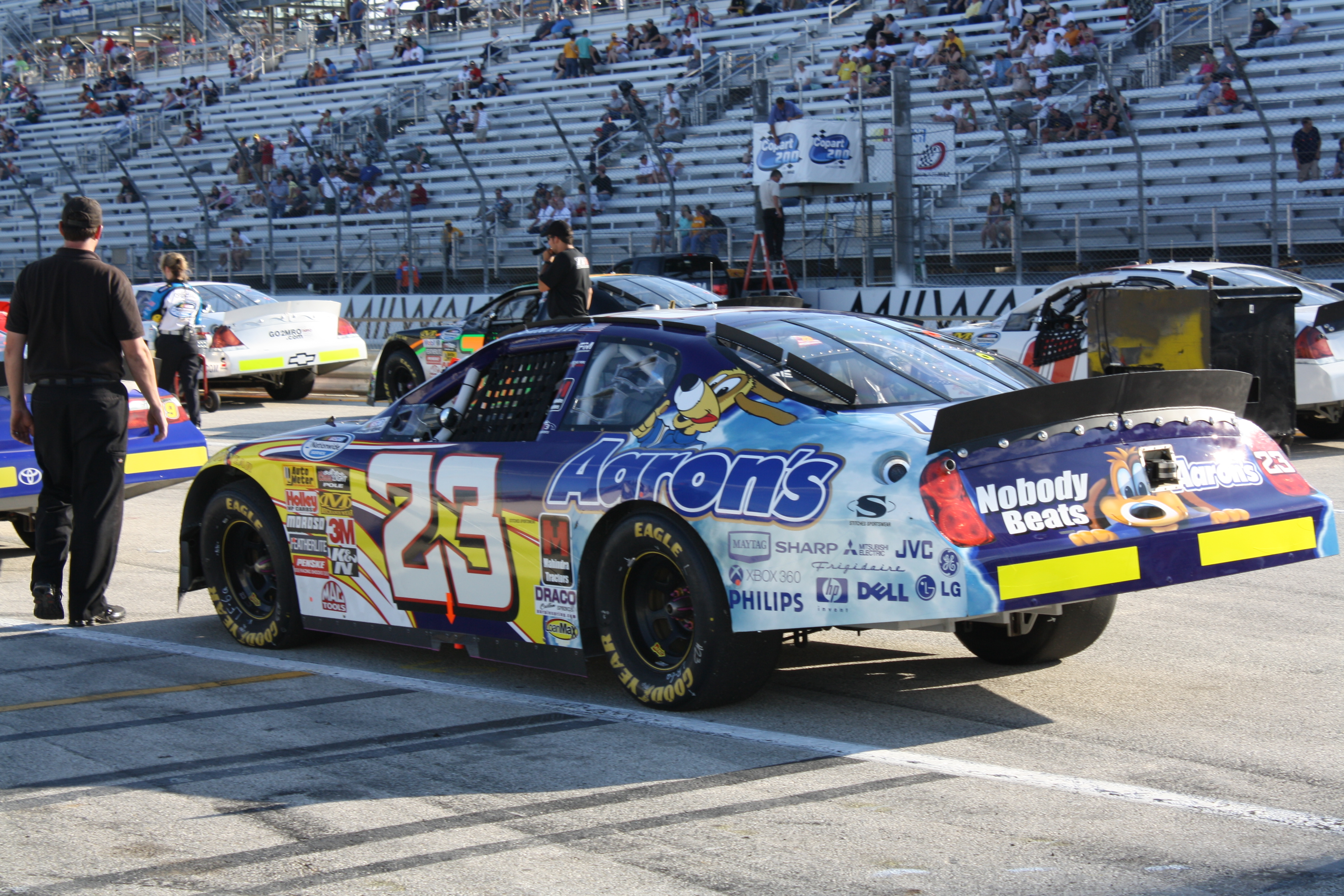
Butler with R3 Motorsports at the Milwaukee Mile in 2009.

=== NASCAR ===
Balancing a part-time ARCA Racing Series schedule in 2007, Butler made two starts for Darrell Waltrip Motorsports in the Camping World Truck Series, but failed to finish either of them. Two years later, Butler signed with R3 Motorsports to run just about half the schedule in the Nationwide Series and named Aaron's as sponsor. He ran well at intermediate tracks such as Las Vegas Motor Speedway and Kentucky Speedway, recording top twenty results on those tracks, but struggled at short tracks like Richmond International Raceway, Dover International Speedway, Indianapolis Raceway Park and Iowa Speedway. Out of a full-time ride in 2010, Butler ran one race for Rick Ware Racing in the Truck Series. He did not return to NASCAR until 2013, when SR² Motorsports brought Butler back for an eight-race schedule, along with his brother Brett Butler for a few races. Out of the eight races, Butler III failed to finish five but posted top-thirty finishes in all the races he finished.

== Personal life ==
Butler had his first child, Piper Shay, in 2009 with his wife Jamie.

== Motorsports career results ==
=== NASCAR ===
(key) (Bold – Pole position awarded by qualifying time. Italics – Pole position earned by points standings or practice time. * – Most laps led.)

==== Nationwide Series ====
NASCAR Nationwide Series results
Year	Team	No.	Make	1	2	3	4	5	6	7	8	9	10	11	12	13	14	15	16	17	18	19	20	21	22	23	24	25	26	27	28	29	30	31	32	33	34	35	NNSC	Pts	Ref
2009	R3 Motorsports	23	Chevy	DAY	CAL; 20	LVS; 17	BRI	TEX	NSH; 37	PHO; 28	TAL	RCH; 35	DAR	CLT	DOV; 37	NSH	KEN; 17	MLW; 26	NHA; 25	DAY	CHI	GTY; 25	IRP; 31	IOW; 33	GLN; QL^{†}	MCH	BRI; 22	CGV	ATL	RCH	DOV; 23	KAN	CAL	CLT; 35	MEM	TEX	PHO; 32	HOM; 27	38th	1361	
2013	SR² Motorsports	24	Toyota	DAY	PHO	LVS	BRI	CAL	TEX	RCH	TAL	DAR	CLT	DOV	IOW; 26			KEN; 24	DAY	NHA		IND; 32	IOW	GLN	MOH	BRI	ATL; 28	RCH	CHI	KEN	DOV	KAN; 32	CLT; 39	TEX	PHO	HOM			46th	99	
2013	SR² Motorsports	00	Toyota													MCH; 34	ROA				CHI; 38																		46th	99	
^{†}- Qualified for Chris Cook.

==== Camping World Truck Series ====
NASCAR Camping World Truck Series results
Year	Team	No.	Make	1	2	3	4	5	6	7	8	9	10	11	12	13	14	15	16	17	18	19	20	21	22	23	24	25	NCWTC	Pts	Ref
2007	Darrell Waltrip Motorsports	00	Toyota	DAY	CAL	ATL	MAR	KAN	CLT	MFD; 36	DOV	TEX	MCH	MLW	MEM; 33	KEN	IRP	NSH	BRI	GTW	NHA	LVS	TAL	MAR	ATL	TEX	PHO	HOM	84th	119	
2010	Rick Ware Racing	6	Chevy	DAY	ATL	MAR	NSH	KAN	DOV	CLT	TEX	MCH	IOW	GTY	IRP	POC	NSH	DAR	BRI	CHI; 27	KEN	NHA	LVS	MAR	TAL	TEX	PHO	HOM	105th	82	

=== ARCA Re/Max Series ===
(key) (Bold – Pole position awarded by qualifying time. Italics – Pole position earned by points standings or practice time. * – Most laps led.)

ARCA Re/Max Series results
Year	Team	No.	Make	1	2	3	4	5	6	7	8	9	10	11	12	13	14	15	16	17	18	19	20	21	22	23	ARSC	Pts	Ref
2007	Eddie Sharp Racing	22	Dodge	DAY	USA; 20	NSH	SLM; 33	KAN	WIN		TOL; 1	IOW; 22	POC		BLN; 9	KEN	POC			MIL; 32	GTW	DSF	CHI	SLM; 11	TAL	TOL; 14	27th	1610	
2007	Eddie Sharp Racing	22	Toyota							KEN; 31				MCH; 7				NSH; 11	ISF								27th	1610	
2008	Eddie Sharp Racing	22	Toyota	DAY; 19	SLM; 20	IOW; 7	**KAN**; 7	CAR; 39	KEN; 4	TOL; 25	POC; 11	MCH; 7	CAY; 21	KEN; 28	BLN; 25	POC; 7	NSH; 6			CHI; 10	SLM; 19		TAL; 36	TOL; 11			10th	4365	
2008	Eddie Sharp Racing	22	Dodge															ISF; 13	DSF; 19			NJE; 16					10th	4365	
2009	Andy Belmont Racing	1	Ford	DAY	SLM	CAR	TAL	KEN	TOL	POC	MCH	MFD	IOW	KEN	BLN	POC	ISF; 33	CHI; 28	TOL; 18	DSF; 22	NJE; 25	SLM; 10	KAN	CAR			41st	700	
