= Amber Cope =

American racing driver (born 1983)

- Born: Amber Nicole Cope; August 18, 1983 (age 43); Puyallup, Washington, U.S.
- Height: 5 ft 3 in (1.60 m)
- Weight: 100 lb (45 kg)

NASCAR O'Reilly Auto Parts Series career
- 2 races run over 2 years
- 2011 position: 130th
- Best finish: 130th (2011)
- First race: 2011 Iowa John Deere Dealers 250 (Iowa)
- Last race: 2012 F.W. Webb 200 (Loudon)
Wins	Top tens	Poles
0	0	0

NASCAR FedEx Freight Truck Series career
- 1 race run over 1 year
- 2010 position: 104th
- Best finish: 104th (2010)
- First race: 2010 Kroger 200 (Martinsville)
Wins	Top tens	Poles
0	0	0
- Statistics up to date as of July 14, 2012.

Amber Nicole Cope (born August 18, 1983) is an American professional stock car racing driver. She is known for making NASCAR history with her sister Angela Cope-Ruch, becoming the first twins to compete in one of its top three series. They made their NASCAR debut in the Camping World Truck Series in Martinsville, Virginia on October 23, 2010. Amber finished 26th and Angela finished 30th.

Cope and her sister began racing in Go-Karts at the age of nine. The sisters quickly gained attention by winning poles and races year after year. By age 15, they stepped up to late-model race cars—even before they had driver's licenses.

In 1995, Cope finished third in the Tri-cities Gold Cup "Yamaha Class". By 1998, both sisters were PSGKA Gold Cup winners in the "Junior Piston Port".

Cope and her sister split seat time in 2006 at the ARCA Re/Max Series at Berlin, Gateway, Chicagoland, Milwaukee Mile, and Toledo, Ohio. By 2008, the twins qualified for the ARCA Re/Max Series at Kentucky Speedway, with positions 8 and 15.

On July 14, 2012, Cope was involved in an incident with Kevin Harvick during the final stages of a Nationwide Series race at New Hampshire when it appeared as though she forced Harvick down the racetrack, which in turn slowed his momentum and enabled Brad Keselowski to win.

She is the niece of 1990 Daytona 500 winner Derrike Cope.

== Racing career ==
Residents of Cornelius, North Carolina, Amber and Angela Cope became the third generation of Copes to enter into the world of racing, when, at nine, the girls' parents gave them a go-kart for Christmas. Once they began competing locally, the girls made a name for themselves and became the most accomplished go-kart racers in the Greater Puget Sound region.

At 15, they progressed to late model race cars even before they had their license to drive. In 2000, a very short time after their debut in late model stock cars they acquired national attention when they were featured on The TODAY Show with Bryant Gumbel.

In 2006, the twins split seat time at the Automobile Racing Club of America's (ARCA) Re/Max Series at Berlin, Gateway, Chicagoland, Milwaukee and Toledo, Ohio. In 2008, they qualified for the ARCA Re/Max Series at Kentucky Speedway with positions 8 and 15.

On October 23, 2010, Amber and Angela Cope became the first twins to compete in the same NASCAR national touring series event, competing together in the Kroger 200 at Martinsville Speedway in the Camping World Truck Series.

Cope made one start in the Nationwide Series in 2011. In 2012, she shared the No. 24 SR2 Motorsports Toyota in the Nationwide Series with Angela Cope and Benny Gordon on a part-time schedule. In her only Nationwide Series start of the season in the F.W. Webb 200 at New Hampshire Motor Speedway, she became the center of controversy after holding up leader Kevin Harvick late in the race. Harvick afterwards stated that Cope "is trying to be Danica Patrick...and [should] find a new job".

== Motorsports career results ==
=== NASCAR ===
(key) (Bold – Pole position awarded by qualifying time. Italics – Pole position earned by points standings or practice time. * – Most laps led.)

==== Nationwide Series ====
NASCAR Nationwide Series results
Year	Team	No.	Make	1	2	3	4	5	6	7	8	9	10	11	12	13	14	15	16	17	18	19	20	21	22	23	24	25	26	27	28	29	30	31	32	33	34	NNSC	Pts	Ref
2011	Keystone Motorsports	93	Chevy	DAY	PHO	LVS	BRI	CAL	TEX	TAL	NSH	RCH	DAR	DOV	IOW; 32	CLT	CHI	MCH	ROA	DAY	KEN	NHA	NSH	IRP	IOW	GLN	CGV	BRI	ATL	RCH	CHI	DOV	KAN	CLT	TEX	PHO	HOM	130th	0	
2012	SR² Motorsports	24	Chevy	DAY	PHO	LVS	BRI	CAL	TEX	RCH	TAL	DAR	IOW	CLT	DOV	MCH	ROA	KEN	DAY	NHA; 26	CHI	IND	IOW	GLN	CGV	BRI	ATL	RCH	CHI	KEN	DOV	CLT	KAN	TEX	PHO	HOM		82nd	18	

==== Camping World Truck Series ====
NASCAR Camping World Truck Series results
Year	Team	No.	Make	1	2	3	4	5	6	7	8	9	10	11	12	13	14	15	16	17	18	19	20	21	22	23	24	25	NCWTC	Pts	Ref
2010	Rick Ware Racing	6	Dodge	DAY	ATL	MAR	NSH	KAN	DOV	CLT	TEX	MCH	IOW	GTY	IRP	POC	NSH	DAR	BRI	CHI	KEN	NHA	LVS	MAR; 26	TAL	TEX	PHO	HOM	104th	85	

=== ARCA Re/Max Series ===
(key) (Bold – Pole position awarded by qualifying time. Italics – Pole position earned by points standings or practice time. * – Most laps led.)

ARCA Re/Max Series results
Year	Team	No.	Make	1	2	3	4	5	6	7	8	9	10	11	12	13	14	15	16	17	18	19	20	21	22	23	ARMC	Pts	Ref
2006	Andy Belmont Racing	1	Ford	DAY	NSH	SLM	WIN	KEN	TOL	POC	MCH	KAN	KEN	BLN	POC	GTW; DNQ	NSH	MCH	ISF	MIL							121st	145	
2006	DGM Racing	72	Chevy																		TOL; 27	DSF					121st	145	
2006	McGlynn Racing	75	Chevy																				CHI; DNQ	SLM	TAL	IOW	121st	145	
2008	Derrike Cope Inc.	70	Dodge	DAY	SLM	IOW	KAN	CAR	KEN	TOL	POC	MCH	CAY	KEN; 38	BLN	POC	NSH	ISF	DSF	CHI	SLM	NJE	TAL	TOL			124th	125	

^{*} Season still in progress
^{1} Ineligible for series points
