= Michael Guerity =

American racing driver

- Born: October 21, 1977 (age 49); Rochester Hills, Michigan, U.S.

NASCAR O'Reilly Auto Parts Series career
- 2 races run over 1 year
- Best finish: 94th (2012)
- First race: 2012 Pioneer Hi-Bred 250 (Iowa)
- Last race: 2012 Alliance Truck Parts 250 (Iowa)
Wins	Top tens	Poles
0	0	0

NASCAR FedEx Freight Truck Series career
- 3 races run over 1 year
- Best finish: 71st (2010)
- First race: 2010 North Carolina Education Lottery 200 (Charlotte)
- Last race: 2010 VFW 200 (Michigan)
Wins	Top tens	Poles
0	0	0

ARCA Menards Series career
- 16 races run over 2 years
- Best finish: 26th (2005)
- First race: 2004 Quaker Steak and Lube 100 (Charlotte)
- Last race: 2005 Food World 300 (Talladega)
Wins	Top tens	Poles
0	5	0
- Statistics up to date as of March 5, 2024.

Michael Guerity (born October 21, 1977) is an American former professional stock car racing driver who has previously competed in the NASCAR Xfinity Series, the NASCAR Craftsman Truck Series, and the ARCA Racing Series.

== Racing career ==
In 2004, Guerity made his debut in the ARCA Re/Max Series at Lowe's Motor Speedway, driving the No. 2 Dodge for Cunningham Motorsports with sponsorship from Hantz Group, where he started as 31st but finished in 39th due to a crash. He then made three more starts across the year, getting a best finish of 25th at Michigan International Speedway. In 2005, Guerity ran a majority of the races that year, getting five top-ten finishes with a best finish of second at Michigan, where he finished behind race winner Steve Wallace by four tenths of a second. Guerity originally had a ride secured for the 2006 season, but funding and sponsorship issues forced him out of the ride, and he was forced to sit out of the year.

After not racing in 2007, Guerity attempted to make his NASCAR Nationwide Series debut at Michigan, driving the No. 57 Dodge for Mike Ege Racing, but ultimately failed to qualify.

After taking another year off of racing, Guerity made his NASCAR Camping World Truck Series debut at Charlotte, driving the No. 01 Chevrolet for Daisy Ramirez Motorsports, where he finished in 31st due to engine issues. He then drove the No. 6 Chevrolet for Rick Ware Racing at the next race at Texas Motor Speedway, where he finished in 25th due to clutch issues. He then returned to Daisy Ramirez Motorsports at the very next race at Michigan, where he finished nine laps down in 26th position. It was also during this year when he ran in the ISCARS Series, where he finished in eighth in points despite running only seven races.

In 2012, Guerity once again attempted to make his debut in the NASCAR Nationwide Series at Iowa Speedway, this time driving the No. 75 Chevrolet for Rick Ware Racing. He qualified for the event in 43rd, and finished in 39th after running four laps due to clutch issues. He then returned to RWR at Michigan, this time running the No. 71, where he finished in 40th after six laps due to vibration issues. The Michigan race would be his most recent event as a driver, as he has not competed in any racing series since then.

== Motorsports results ==
=== NASCAR ===
(key) (Bold – Pole position awarded by qualifying time. Italics – Pole position earned by points standings or practice time. * – Most laps led.)

==== Nationwide Series ====
NASCAR Nationwide Series results
Year	Team	No.	Make	1	2	3	4	5	6	7	8	9	10	11	12	13	14	15	16	17	18	19	20	21	22	23	24	25	26	27	28	29	30	31	32	33	34	35	NNSC	Pts	Ref
2008	Mike Ege Racing	57	Dodge	DAY	CAL	LVS	ATL	BRI	NSH	TEX	PHO	MXC	TAL	RCH	DAR	CLT	DOV	NSH	KEN	MLW	NHA	DAY	CHI	GTY	IRP	CGV	GLN	MCH; DNQ	BRI	CAL	RCH	DOV	KAN	CLT	MEM	TEX	PHO	HOM	N/A	0	
2012	Rick Ware Racing	75	Chevy	DAY	PHO	LVS	BRI	CAL	TEX	RCH	TAL	DAR	IOW; 39	CLT	DOV																								94th	9	
2012	Rick Ware Racing	71	Chevy													MCH; 40	ROA	KEN	DAY	NHA	CHI	IND	IOW	GLN	CGV	BRI	ATL	RCH	CHI	KEN	DOV	CLT	KAN	TEX	PHO	HOM			94th	9	

==== Camping World Truck Series ====
NASCAR Camping World Truck Series results
Year	Team	No.	Make	1	2	3	4	5	6	7	8	9	10	11	12	13	14	15	16	17	18	19	20	21	22	23	24	25	NCWTC	Pts	Ref
2010	Daisy Ramirez Motorsports	01	Chevy	DAY	ATL	MAR	NSH	KAN	DOV	CLT; 31		MCH; 26	IOW	GTY	IRP	POC	NSH	DAR	BRI	CHI	KEN	NHA	LVS	MAR	TAL	TEX	PHO	HOM	71st	243	
2010	Rick Ware Racing	6	Chevy								TEX; 25																		71st	243	

==== Goody's Dash Series ====
NASCAR Goody's Dash Series results
Year	Team	No.	Make	1	2	3	4	5	6	7	8	NGDS	Pts	Ref
2003	N/A	77	Toyota	DAY	OGL; 22		SBO; 27	GRE				28th	413	
2003	Guerity Racing	04	Pontiac			CLT; 39			KEN; 20	BRI; 26	ATL	28th	413	

=== ARCA Re/Max Series ===
(key) (Bold – Pole position awarded by qualifying time. Italics – Pole position earned by points standings or practice time. * – Most laps led.)

ARCA Re/Max Series results
Year	Team	No.	Make	1	2	3	4	5	6	7	8	9	10	11	12	13	14	15	16	17	18	19	20	21	22	23	ARMC	Pts	Ref
2004	Cunningham Motorsports	2	Dodge	DAY	NSH	SLM	KEN	TOL	CLT; 39	KAN	POC										TOL; 32	DSF	CHI; 35	SLM	TAL		90th	270	
2004	Cunningham Motorsports	7	Dodge									MCH; 25	SBO	BLN	KEN	GTW	POC	LER	NSH	ISF							90th	270	
2005	Cunningham Motorsports	4	Dodge	DAY; 4	NSH; DNQ	SLM	KEN; 26	TOL	LAN	MIL	POC; 5	MCH; 31	KAN; 28	KEN; 27	BLN	POC; 8	GTW; 13	LER	NSH; 13	MCH; 2	ISF	TOL; 21	DSF	CHI	SLM	TAL; 7	26th	1860	
