= Michelle Theriault =

American racing driver (born 1986)

- Born: April 17, 1986 (age 40) Bristol, Connecticut, U.S.

NASCAR K&N Pro Series East career
- Debut season: 2007
- Wins: 0
- Poles: 0
- Best finish: 13th in 2007
- Finished last season: 30th (2011)

Previous series
- 2005 2007: NASCAR West Series; ARCA Re/Max Series

NASCAR FedEx Freight Truck Series career
- 6 races run over 3 years
- 2010 position: 83rd
- Best finish: 68th (2009)
- First race: 2008 O'Reilly Auto Parts 250 (Kansas)
- Last race: 2010 Nashville 200 (Nashville)
Wins	Top tens	Poles
0	0	0
- Statistics up to date as of July 24, 2020.

Michelle Theriault (pronounced "terry-oh") (born April 17, 1986) is an American former professional stock car racing driver. She competed part-time in NASCAR's Truck (from 2008 and 2010), and West Series (in 2005) and in the ARCA Re/Max Series in 2007. She also competed full-time in the East Series in 2007, finishing 13th in points, the highest for a female driver in that series at the time.

== Racing career ==
Theriault's record of being the highest-finishing female driver in the East Series points at year's-end would be both broken and tied in 2013, with Kenzie Ruston's sixth place finish in the standings (that record still stands today) and Mackena Bell finishing 13th, which tied Theriault's points finish from 2007.

Theriault received limited opportunities to drive in the NASCAR Camping World Truck Series; when she did; they were start-and-park rides for DGM Racing and Fast Track Racing.

== Personal life ==
Theriault was born in Bristol, Connecticut to parents Dave and Denise. She has one sibling; a sister named Tina. Despite sharing the same last name and both being from New England, she is not related to fellow driver Austin Theriault.

Her parents later moved to Atlanta when Theriault was 17 to support her goal of becoming a NASCAR champion.

== Motorsports career results ==
=== NASCAR ===
(key) (Bold – Pole position awarded by qualifying time. Italics – Pole position earned by points standings or practice time. * – Most laps led.)

==== Camping World Truck Series ====
NASCAR Camping World Truck Series results
Year	Team	No.	Make	1	2	3	4	5	6	7	8	9	10	11	12	13	14	15	16	17	18	19	20	21	22	23	24	25	NCWTC	Pts	Ref
2008	Derrike Cope Inc.	73	Dodge	DAY	CAL	ATL	MAR	KAN; 35	CLT	MFD	DOV	TEX	MCH	MLW	MEM	KEN	IRP	NSH	BRI	GTW	NHA	LVS	TAL	MAR	ATL	TEX	PHO	HOM	112th	58	
2009	DGM Racing	72	Chevy	DAY	CAL	ATL	MAR	KAN	CLT	DOV	TEX	MCH	MLW	MEM; 34	KEN; 32	IRP	NSH	BRI	CHI; DNQ	IOW; 36	GTW	NHA	LVS	MAR	TAL	TEX	PHO	HOM	68th	183	
2010	Fast Track Racing Enterprises	48	Chevy	DAY	ATL	MAR	NSH	KAN	DOV	CLT	TEX	MCH	IOW	GTY	IRP; 32		NSH; 27	DAR	BRI	CHI	KEN	NHA	LVS	MAR	TAL	TEX	PHO	HOM	83rd	149	
2010	Fast Track Racing Enterprises	49	Chevy													POC; DNQ													83rd	149	

==== K&N Pro Series East ====
NASCAR K&N Pro Series East results
Year	Team	No.	Make	1	2	3	4	5	6	7	8	9	10	11	12	13	NKNPSEC	Pts	Ref
2007	Spraker Racing Enterprises	37	Chevy	GRE; 8	ELK; 7	IOW; 10	SBO; 32	STA; 25	NHA; 13	TMP; 23	NSH; 13	ADI; 19	LRP; 18	MFD; 23	NHA; 20	DOV; 20	13th	1434	
2011	Van Pounds	45	Toyota	GRE; 30	SBO; 28	RCH	IOW; DNQ	BGS	JFC; 29	LGY; 26	NHA; 28	COL					30th	553	
2011	Van Pounds	45	Dodge										GRE; 24	NHA	DOV		30th	553	

==== West Series ====
NASCAR West Series results
Year	Team	No.	Make	1	2	3	4	5	6	7	8	9	10	11	12	NWSC	Pts	Ref
2005	Performance P-1 Motorsports	77	Ford	PHO	MMR	PHO	S99	IRW	EVG	S99	PPR	CAL	DCS; 15	CTS	MMR	50th	118	

=== ARCA Re/Max Series ===
(key) (Bold – Pole position awarded by qualifying time. Italics – Pole position earned by points standings or practice time. * – Most laps led.)

ARCA Re/Max Series results
Year	Team	No.	Make	1	2	3	4	5	6	7	8	9	10	11	12	13	14	15	16	17	18	19	20	21	22	23	ARMSC	Pts	Ref
2007	Spraker Racing Enterprises	37	Chevy	DAY	USA; 36	NSH	SLM	KAN	WIN	KEN; 22	TOL	IOW	POC	MCH	BLN	KEN	POC	NSH; 28	ISF	MIL	GTW; 15	DSF	CHI; 34	SLM	TAL	TOL; 11	50th	650	
