= G. R. Smith =

American racing driver

- Born: June 2, 1981 (age 45); Folsom, New Jersey, U.S.
- Achievements: 2017 Uncle Sam 30 Winner

NASCAR FedEx Freight Truck Series career
- 1 race run over 1 year
- 2010 position: 120th
- Best finish: 120th (2010)
- First race: 2010 Nashville 200 (Nashville)
Wins	Top tens	Poles
0	0	0
- Statistics up to date as of March 19, 2023.

G. R. Smith (born June 2, 1981) is an American professional dirt racing and stock car racing driver and team owner. He has raced in the NASCAR Camping World Truck Series and the ARCA Re/Max Series previously and currently runs nationally in Dirt Super Late Models for his own team, Team 22 in the No. 22 Longhorn Chassis.

== Racing career ==
Smith began his career racing on dirt tracks in his home state of New Jersey, winning the track championship at Bridgeport Speedway in 2001 and the track championship at New Egypt Speedway in 2002. He also raced super late models starting in 2006 after graduating from college.

Smith raced part-time in the ARCA Re/Max Series for three years from 2004 through 2006. He made his debut at Lake Erie Speedway in the No. 06 for Bobby Gerhart Racing, using Wayne Peterson's owner points. Three races later, he returned for BGR to race at Toledo in the No. 94. In both of those starts, Smith ran in the top-10 during a portion of the race. In 2005, Smith began the season driving for Bob Schacht Motorsports in their No. 75 Ford at ARCA's Daytona testing, with anticipation that the team would be able to run full-time. He would only end up running the first two races for that team before running the next three for Keith Murt's No. 19 team. After not making any more ARCA starts for the rest of the 2005 season, Smith returned for the Daytona season-opener again the following year, returning to Bobby Gerhart's team in his No. 7 car. This ended up being his last ARCA start.

In 2010, Smith would go on to made two Truck Series attempts (at Nashville and Kansas) for MAKE Motorsports in their No. 50 Dodge. He was the new team's first driver. When it was first announced that he would join the team, team owners Mark Beaver and Tracy Lowe indicated they hoped he could run the full season in 2011. However, this did not happen, and T. J. Bell became MAKE's driver instead of Smith in the middle of the 2010 season and then in 2011 as well.

Smith has not made many NASCAR or ARCA starts since then, but was still racing as of 2015, often competing in late model events in the World of Outlaws Late Model Series.

== Personal life ==
Smith is from Folsom, New Jersey, and attended West Virginia University where he earned a degree in sports business (communications and athletic coaching). After graduating in 2006, Smith moved to Cornelius, North Carolina (where most NASCAR teams are located close by) to go racing. He also owns a business called Victory Circle Auto Sales, and shut down his late model team in 2010 to focus on growing his business.

Smith also played ice hockey in college and could have had an NHL career, but was in a better position to have a career in racing, so he stuck with that afterwards.

G. R. is Smith's nickname, and it stands for "Great Racer".

== Motorsports career results ==
=== NASCAR ===
(key) (Bold – Pole position awarded by qualifying time. Italics – Pole position earned by points standings or practice time. * – Most laps led.)

==== Camping World Truck Series ====
NASCAR Camping World Truck Series results
Year	Team	No.	Make	1	2	3	4	5	6	7	8	9	10	11	12	13	14	15	16	17	18	19	20	21	22	23	24	25	NCWTC	Pts	Ref
2010	MAKE Motorsports	50	Dodge	DAY	ATL	MAR	NSH; 36	KAN; DNQ	DOV	CLT	TEX	MCH	IOW	GTW	IRP	POC	NSH	DAR	BRI	CHI	KEN	NHA	LVS	MAR	TAL	TEX	PHO	HOM	120th	55	

=== ARCA Re/Max Series ===
(key) (Bold – Pole position awarded by qualifying time. Italics – Pole position earned by points standings or practice time. * – Most laps led.)

ARCA Re/Max Series results
Year	Team	No.	Make	1	2	3	4	5	6	7	8	9	10	11	12	13	14	15	16	17	18	19	20	21	22	23	ARMC	Pts	Ref
2004	Gerhart Racing	06	Chevy	DAY	NSH	SLM	KEN	TOL	CLT	KAN	POC	MCH	SBO	BLN	KEN	GTW	POC	LER; 21	NSH	ISF							105th	220	
2004	Gerhart Racing	94	Chevy																		TOL; 27	DSF	CHI	SLM	TAL		105th	220	
2005	Bob Schacht Motorsports	75	Ford	DAY; 16	NSH; 35																						48th	740	
2005	KLM Motorsports	19	Chevy			SLM; 27	KEN; 22	TOL; 32	LAN	MIL	POC	MCH	KAN	KEN	BLN	POC	GTW	LER	NSH	MCH	ISF	TOL	DSF	CHI	SLM	TAL	48th	740	
2006	Gerhart Racing	94	Chevy	DAY; 32	NSH	SLM	WIN	KEN	TOL	POC	MCH	KAN	KEN	BLN	POC	GTW	NSH	MCH	ISF	MIL	TOL	DSF	CHI	SLM	TAL	IOW	160th	70	
