= Cope Family Racing =

NASCAR team

- Owner(s): Derrike Cope; Kevin Cope; Stanton Barrett (partnership)
- Base: Mooresville, North Carolina
- Series: NASCAR O'Reilly Auto Parts Series
- Race drivers: 30. TBA / Baltazar Leguizamón
- Manufacturer: Chevrolet
- Opened: 2001

Career
- Debut: Sprint Cup Series: 2002 Coca-Cola Racing Family 600 (Charlotte); Xfinity Series: 2008 Meijer 300 (Kentucky); Camping World Truck Series: 2001 Silverado 350 (Texas); ARCA Racing Series: 2008 Kentucky ARCA Re/Max 150 (Kentucky)
- Latest race: Sprint Cup Series: 2003 Pop Secret Microwave Popcorn 400 (Rockingham); Xfinity Series: 2026 O'Reilly Auto Parts 300 (Homestead); Camping World Truck Series: 2009 O'Reilly Auto Parts 250 (Kansas); ARCA Racing Series: 2013 ZLOOP 150 (Kentucky)
- Races competed: Total: 214; Cup Series: 22; O'Reilly Auto Parts Series: 165; Truck Series: 19; ARCA Racing Series: 8
- Drivers' Championships: Total: 0 Cup Series: 0 O'Reilly Auto Parts Series: 0 Truck Series: 0 ARCA Racing Series: 0
- Race victories: Total: 0 Cup Series: 0 O'Reilly Auto Parts Series: 0 Truck Series: 0 ARCA Racing Series: 0
- Pole positions: Total: 0 Cup Series: 0 O'Reilly Auto Parts Series: 0 Truck Series: 0 ARCA Racing Series: 0

Cope Family Racing (formerly known as Derrike Cope Racing with JP Motorsports, Creation-Cope Racing, CFK Motorsports, Stratus Racing Group, Cope/Keller Racing, Derrike Cope, Inc, and Quest Motor Racing) is an American professional stock car racing team that competes in the NASCAR O'Reilly Auto Parts Series.

The team is owned by Derrike Cope and his family, and they currently field the No. 30 Chevrolet Camaro SS full-time in the O'Reilly Auto Parts Series through a partnership with Stanton Barrett Motorsports for Baltazar Leguizamón and other drivers who have yet to be determined. Through the years, Cope has had partnerships with several other co-owners and the team has gone through a variety of name changes with each co-owner as they have come and gone.

The team had closed before the start of the 2017 season but re-opened in 2025 as Cope Family Racing. In 2026, CFR would enter their current partnership with SBM and the two teams would jointly field an entry, the No. 30 car, in the O'Reilly Auto Parts Series under the name Barrett–Cope Racing.

== Organizational changes ==
The team originally opened as Quest Motor Racing in 2001. Cope was the team's driver, and he also co-owned the team with Warren Johnson, a drag racer. During the 2003 Winston Cup season, the No. 37 Chevrolet attempted majority of the seasons 36 races, but only made eighteen. The team was sponsored by Friendly's Ice Cream, but could only operate on a smaller budget compared to the competition. For 2004, Cope and team were to return with new sponsorship from Paramount Hospitality Management LLC (PHM). But before Speedweeks, PHM backed off, leaving Cope heavily underfunded again. Cope and team were approached by Florida businessman Don Arnold and his team, Arnold Motorsports, for a merger. Cope had attempted the 2003 finale at Homestead, but failed to qualify. The merger consisted of the 79 and 37 teams merging to create the No. 50 Arnold Motorsports Dodge. The team used Cope's 2003 Owner Points, to ensure a better chance of making races, as well as Cope's equipment. Cope successfully made the Daytona 500, but crashed and finished 30th. A few weeks later at Darlington, Cope qualified fifth, ran up front the majority of the race, but a pit road issue relegated the team to a 25th-place finish. After the Coca-Cola 600, Cope and Arnold split, with Cope taking his equipment away from the team, but leaving Arnold with the points.

The team made two attempts in 2008 in Cup, rebranded as Cope/Keller Racing, DNQ'ing in both. The team also ran a partial Nationwide schedule, fielding cars for several drivers. The team returned part-time in 2009 with sponsorship from Blu Frog Energy and Flip'n Bags.com. On December 14, 2009, Cope and Keller partnered with Dale Clemons to form Stratus Racing Group in the ARCA, Nationwide, Truck, and Cup Series. The team fielded cars in all levels in 2010 including two ARCA teams and Nationwide and Truck teams. The Sprint Cup effort was part-time in 2010 but it increased in 2011.

In the Truck Series, Cope and nieces Angela and Amber Cope ran limited schedules. The sisters made their first starts in 2010 in the Truck Series at Martinsville. Angela ran the No. 01 Odyssey Batteries Dodge Ram and Amber in the No. 6 Dodge Ram with the same sponsors. Angela finished 30th and Amber 26th.

In 2026, Derrike Cope entered another co-owning partnership with fellow driver Stanton Barrett and CFR's No. 70 car from 2025 was renumbered to the No. 30 for the re-branded Stanton Barrett Motorsports with Cope Family Racing in the re-branded O'Reilly Auto Parts Series. On January 5, 2026, Barrett–Cope Racing was announced as the newly-merged team's new name.

== NASCAR Sprint Cup Series ==
=== Car No. 37 history ===
The team originally opened in 2001 with Derrike Cope driving the No. 37 K&N Filters Pontiac, but never made a race. The team returned in 2002, this time running the Ford Taurus. In 2003, the team planned to attempt all 36 races in the No. 37 Friendly's Ice Cream Chevrolet. Stratus Racing Group was previously called Cope/Keller Racing and Derrike Cope Inc. in Nationwide.

==== Car No. 37 results ====
Year	Driver	No.	Make	1	2	3	4	5	6	7	8	9	10	11	12	13	14	15	16	17	18	19	20	21	22	23	24	25	26	27	28	29	30	31	32	33	34	35	36	Owners	Pts
2001	Derrike Cope	37	Pontiac	DAY; DNQ	CAR	LVS	ATL	DAR	BRI	TEX	MAR	TAL	CAL	RCH	CLT; DNQ	DOV	MCH	POC	SON	DAY	CHI	NHA	POC	IND; DNQ	GLN	MCH	BRI	DAR	RCH	DOV	KAN	CLT	MAR	TAL	PHO	CAR	HOM	ATL	NHA	60th	72
2002	Derrike Cope	37	Ford	DAY	CAR	LVS	ATL	DAR	BRI	TEX	MAR	TAL	CAL	RCH	CLT; DNQ	DOV; DNQ	POC	MCH; 38	SON	DAY	CHI	NHA	POC; 35	IND; DNQ	GLN	MCH	BRI	DAR	RCH											53rd	250
2002	Kevin Lepage	37	Ford																											NHA; 40	DOV	KAN	TAL	CLT	MAR	ATL	CAR			53rd	250
2002	Jeff Jefferson	37	Pontiac																																			PHO; DNQ	HOM	53rd	250
2003	Derrike Cope	37	Chevy	DAY; DNQ	CAR; 43	LVS; 29	ATL	DAR	BRI; 43	TEX	TAL	MAR; 42	CAL; 43	RCH; DNQ	CLT; DNQ	DOV; DNQ	POC; DNQ	MCH; 40	SON	DAY	CHI; 43	NHA; 35	POC; 42	IND; 36	GLN	MCH; 34	BRI; DNQ	DAR; 39	RCH	NHA; DNQ	DOV; 35	TAL	KAN; 38	CLT; 37	MAR; 42	ATL; 40	PHO; DNQ	CAR; 43	HOM; DNQ	43rd	1037

=== Car No. 38 history ===
In 2002, the team fielded the No. 38 GEICO Ford for Kevin Lepage at Coca-Cola 600.

==== Car No. 38 results ====
Year	Driver	No.	Make	1	2	3	4	5	6	7	8	9	10	11	12	13	14	15	16	17	18	19	20	21	22	23	24	25	26	27	28	29	30	31	32	33	34	35	36	Owners	Pts
2002	Kevin Lepage	38	Ford	DAY	CAR	LVS	ATL	DAR	BRI	TEX	MAR	TAL	CAL	RCH	CLT; 43	DOV	POC	MCH	SON	DAY	CHI	NHA	POC	IND	GLN	MCH	BRI	DAR	RCH	NHA	DOV	KAN	TAL	CLT	MAR	ATL	CAR	PHO	HOM	73rd	34

=== Car No. 75 history ===
The team made two attempts in 2008 in Cup fielding the No. 75 Dodge, rebranded as Cope/Keller Racing, DNQ'ing in both.

The No. 75 team returned part-time in 2009 with sponsorship from Blu Frog Energy and Flip'n Bags.com. On December 14, 2009, Cope and Keller partnered with Dale Clemons to form Stratus Racing Group.

Stratus was sponsored by Connectyx Technologies Holdings Group Inc for the select Nationwide and Truck races in 2010. The drivers were Derrike Cope (Nationwide) as well as Angela and Amber Cope in the Truck Series.

In their first competition of the season. Derrike Cope finished 24th in the Bud Shootout.

Derrike Cope and Stratus Racing entered the 2011 Goodys Fast Relief 500 at Martinsville, but withdrew on Thursday before practice on Friday. Cope entered in the Showtime Southern 500 at Darlington. Cope has changed manufacturers from Dodge Charger to Chevrolet Impala. He was forced to withdraw from Darlington when the engine in his MAXcellence Chevrolet was tested on an engine dyno and determined to not have enough power to make the race. Cope hoped to be ready for the Sprint Showdown. When problems again plagued the team, Cope went to race for Max Q Motorsports in the 64. During the showdown race, Landon Cassill blew a tire and spun in front of Cope's Ford, causing Cope to T-bone the side of Cassill's car. Neither driver was injured.

==== Car No. 75 results ====
Year	Driver	No.	Make	1	2	3	4	5	6	7	8	9	10	11	12	13	14	15	16	17	18	19	20	21	22	23	24	25	26	27	28	29	30	31	32	33	34	35	36	Owners	Pts
2008	Derrike Cope	75	Dodge	DAY	CAL	LVS	ATL	BRI	MAR	TEX	PHO	TAL	RCH	DAR	CLT	DOV	POC	MCH	SON	NHA	DAY	CHI	IND	POC	GLN	MCH	BRI	CAL	RCH	NHA	DOV	KAN	TAL	CLT; DNQ	MAR; DNQ	ATL	TEX	PHO	HOM	55th	59
2009	Derrike Cope	75	Dodge	DAY; DNQ	CAL	LVS	ATL	BRI	MAR; DNQ	TEX	PHO	TAL	RCH	DAR	CLT	DOV; DNQ	POC; DNQ	MCH	SON	NHA	DAY	CHI	IND; DNQ	POC	GLN	MCH	BRI	ATL	RCH	NHA; DNQ	DOV	KAN	CAL	CLT	MAR	TAL	TEX	PHO	HOM	54th	144
2010	Derrike Cope	75	Dodge	DAY; DNQ	CAL	LVS	ATL	BRI	MAR	PHO	TEX	TAL	RCH	DAR	DOV	CLT	POC	MCH	SON	NHA	DAY	CHI	IND	POC	GLN	MCH	BRI	ATL	RCH	NHA	DOV	KAN	CAL	CLT	MAR	TAL	TEX	PHO	HOM	62nd	19
2011	Derrike Cope	75	Dodge	DAY	PHO	LVS	BRI	CAL	MAR	TEX	TAL	RCH	DAR; Wth	DOV	CLT	KAN	POC	MCH	SON	DAY	KEN	NHA	IND	POC	GLN	MCH	BRI	ATL	RCH	CHI	NHA	DOV	KAN	CLT	TAL	MAR; DNQ	TEX	PHO	HOM	60th	0

== O'Reilly Auto Parts Series ==
=== Car No. 30 history ===
==== 2026: Partnership with Stanton Barrett Motorsports ====
In 2026, CFR formed a partnership with Stanton Barrett Motorsports, a team returning to the series for the first time since 2008 and NASCAR for the first time since 2015 and the No. 70 car from 2025 was renumbered to the No. 30 (a number SBM ran in 2007 and 2008 in their previous stint in the series) and the two teams would jointly field the entry full-time. On January 5, 2026, Argentinian driver Baltazar Leguizamón was announced as the team's first driver, running the races at COTA, Martinsville in the spring and Watkins Glen. He will share the car with other drivers who have yet to be determined.

==== Car No. 30 results ====
Year	Driver	No.	Make	1	2	3	4	5	6	7	8	9	10	11	12	13	14	15	16	17	18	19	20	21	22	23	24	25	26	27	28	29	30	31	32	33	Owners	Pts
2026	Carson Ware	30	Chevy	DAY; 19																																		
2026	Cody Ware	30	Chevy		ATL; 31																																	
2026	Baltazar Leguizamón	30	Chevy			COA; 37																																
2026	Austin J. Hill	30	Chevy				PHO; 34																															
2026	Myatt Snider	30	Chevy					LVS; DNQ	DAR; 33	MAR; 19	CAR	BRI	KAN	TAL	TEX	GLN	DOV	CLT	NSS	POC	COR	SON	CHI	ATL	IND	IOW	DAY	DAR	GTW	BRI	LVS	CLT	PHO	TAL	MAR	HOM		
2026	Stanton Barrett	30	Chevy																																			

=== Car No. 70 history ===
==== 2014 ====
The team competed full-time in the 2014 NASCAR Nationwide Series season fielding the No. 70 Chevrolet Camaro. Cope purchased all assets from the former ML Motorsports for the 2014 season. The team tested at Daytona in January, at the annual Daytona testing event. In February, the team went to Daytona International Speedway and qualified for the Drive for COPD 300, finishing in the 37th position after some difficulties. Charlies Soap continued to sponsor the car through round number four of the season at Bristol, where Cope finished in 28th. In the following race at Auto Club Speedway, the team was sponsored by Youtheory. Youtheory continued to sponsor the car full-time until the final Texas race of the season. Charlies Soap came on board in the final Charlotte race as well. Cope finished in thirteenth place at the Firecracker 300 at Daytona in the summer, which ended up being his best finish of the year. Cope ended the year 23rd in the points standings.

==== 2015 ====
The same plans are in place for 2015, with sponsorship from Charlie's Soap. 2015 was not a good season for the 70 team. The team missed the first race of the season and was plagued with several problems in the following weeks. During the California race weekend, Cope's team hauler was surrounded by African Swarming Bees. Sponsorship problems also plagued the team. Cope's next DNQ came at Talladega when his car was not fast enough to make the field. Cope had originally missed the July 4th race at Daytona, but the No. 13 MBM Motorsports car driven by Mark Thompson was found to be illegal. Thompson, who originally qualified 33rd, was wiped from the field and his spot was given to Cope. The team also ran with younger drivers who had brought sponsor dollars along. The team finished 37th in owner points.

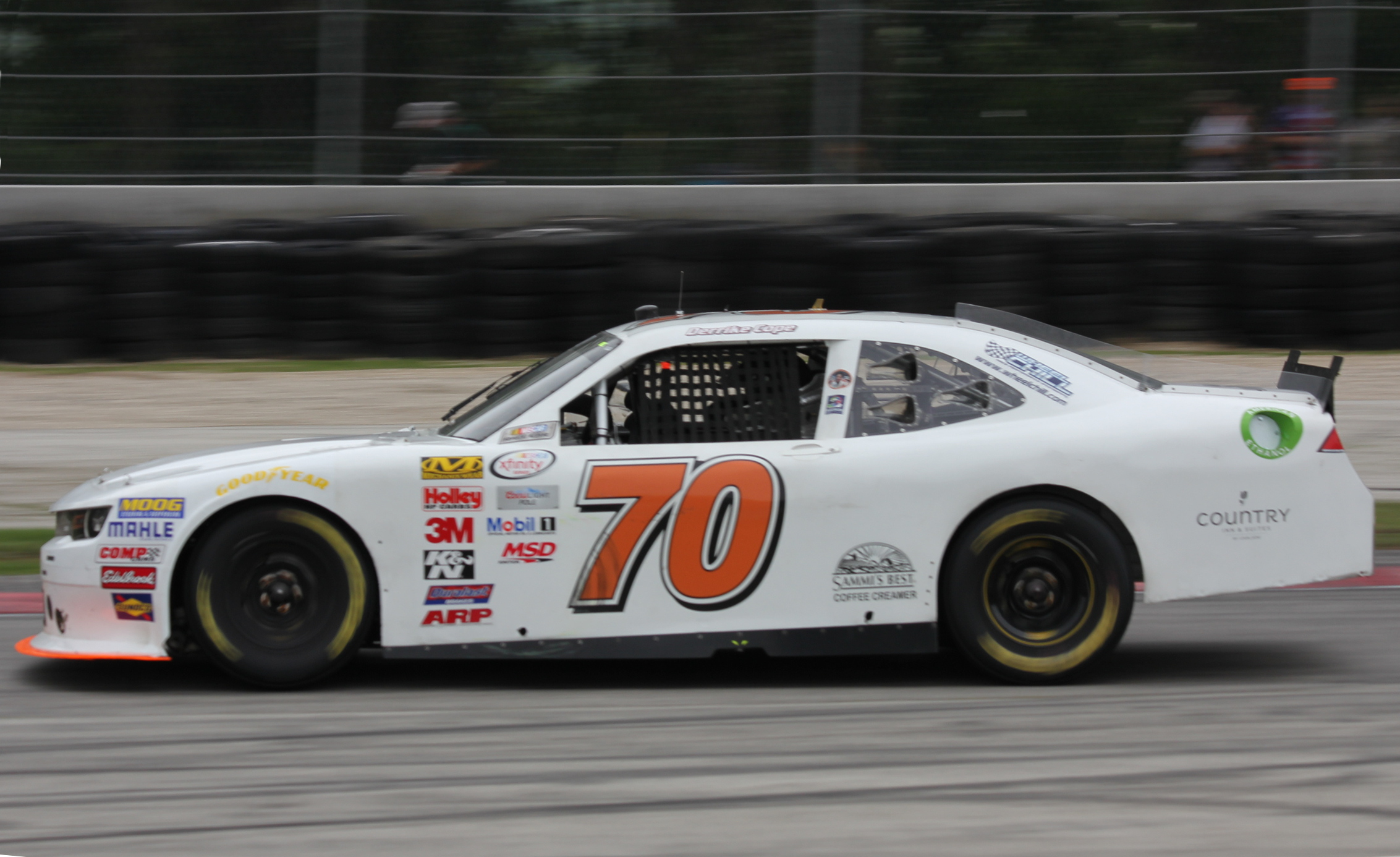
2015 Xfinity car at Road America

==== 2016 ====
Cope announced at the end of the 2015 season that he would again run the full schedule in 2016, in a partnership with JP Motorsports. Sponsorship for Daytona was revealed as Ice-Aid. They would serve as primary sponsor for Daytona and associate sponsor throughout the season. The team DNQ'd at Daytona. In Atlanta, the team finished 27th with Adrenalin Powersports and Ice-Aid on board. The following week in Las Vegas, with E-hydrate and Ice-Aid on the car, the team wrecked the primary in practice. They got the back up car ready, but unfortunately cleared tech just after the qualifying session ended and did not qualify. Timmy Hill was hired to drive two road courses: Mid-Ohio and Road America. Dexter Stacey drove the car in the last three races of season.

==== 2017 ====
The team announced via Facebook that they would not be returning for the 2017 NASCAR season. Cope would return part-time to the Cup series for Premium Motorsports, and later take a managerial role at the newly formed StarCom Racing, along with driving duties.

==== 2025: Rebranding and Return ====
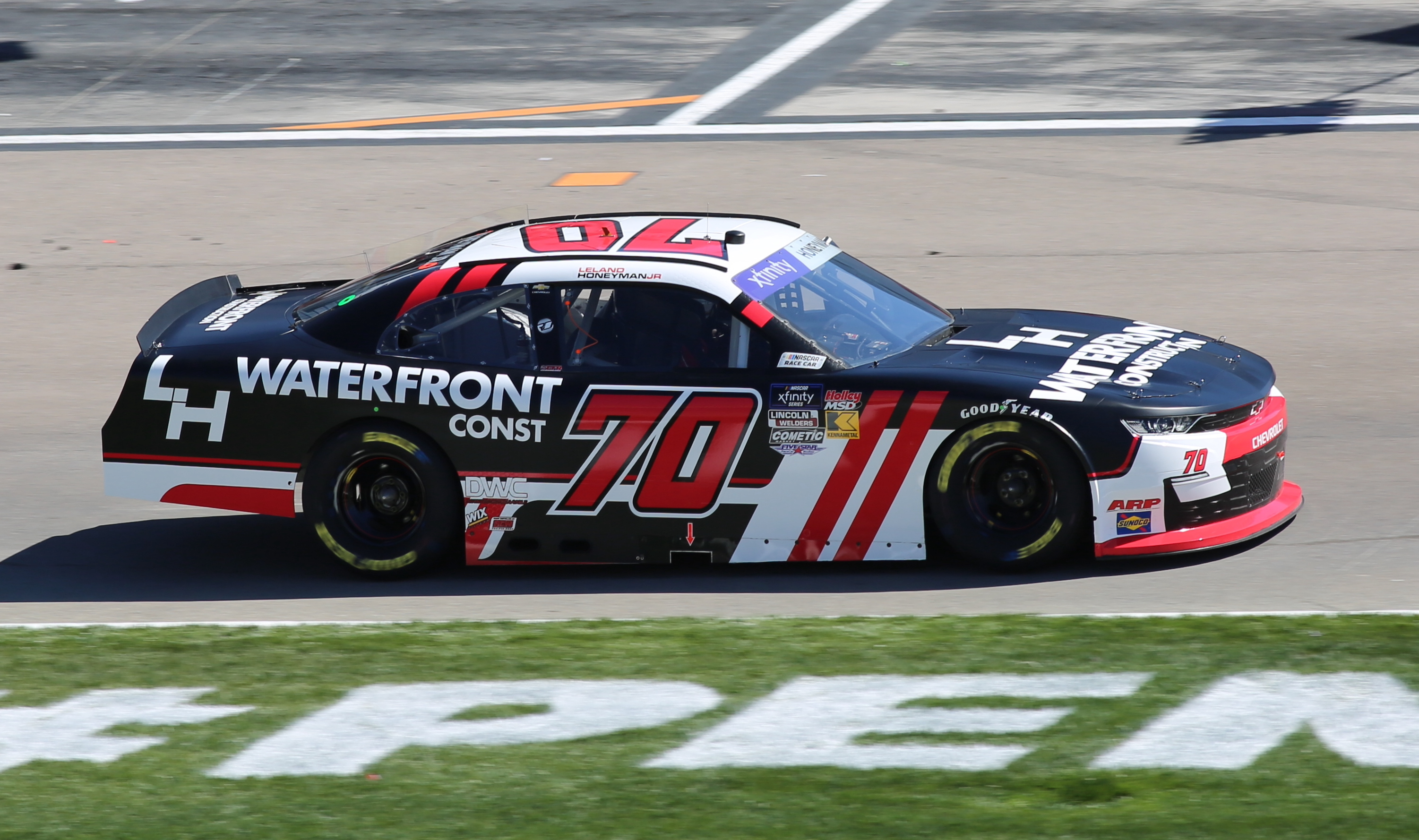
Leland Honeyman in the No. 70 at Las Vegas Motor Speedway in 2025

During an appearance on The Dale Jr. Download, Cope had alluded to re-entering NASCAR competition, likely in the NASCAR Xfinity Series. This was confirmed in January 2025 with the announcement of Cope Family Racing. Leland Honeyman and Thomas Annunziata were announced as drivers of the team's No. 70 Chevrolet. The re-started team formed an alliance with Richard Childress Racing and ECR Engines.

==== Car No. 70 results ====
Year	Driver	No.	Make	1	2	3	4	5	6	7	8	9	10	11	12	13	14	15	16	17	18	19	20	21	22	23	24	25	26	27	28	29	30	31	32	33	Owners	Pts
2014	Derrike Cope	70	Chevy	DAY; 37	PHO; 34	LVS; 35	BRI; 28	CAL; 28	TEX; 38	DAR; 29	RCH; 28	TAL; DNQ	IOW; 37	CLT; 36	DOV; 24	MCH; 35	ROA; 33	KEN; 37	DAY; 13	NHA; 28	CHI; 30	IND; 34	IOW; 34	GLN; 22	MOH; 32	BRI; DNQ	ATL; 31	RCH; DNQ	CHI; 36	KEN; 33	DOV; 37	KAN; 23	CLT; 25	TEX; DNQ	PHO; 31	HOM; DNQ	35th	364
2015	Derrike Cope	70	Chevy	DAY; DNQ	ATL; 36	LVS; 33	PHO; 33	CAL; 31	TEX; 36	BRI; 37	RCH; 35	TAL; DNQ	IOW; 29	CLT; DNQ	DOV; 28	MCH; 37	CHI; 35	DAY; 38	KEN; 33	NHA; 32	IND; 30		GLN; 27	MOH; 25	BRI; 30	ROA; 30	DAR; 32		CHI; 31	KEN; 24	DOV; 32	CLT; 32	KAN; 39	TEX; 30			37th	349
2015	Matt Frahm	70	Chevy																			IOW; 31															37th	349
2015	Matt Waltz	70	Chevy																									RCH; 33							PHO; DNQ		37th	349
2015	Garrett Smithley	70	Chevy																																	HOM; 28	37th	349
2016	Derrike Cope	70	Chevy	DAY; DNQ	ATL; 27	LVS; DNQ	PHO; 34	CAL; 34	TEX; 31	BRI; 34	RCH; 30	TAL; DNQ	DOV; 35	CLT; 32	POC; 37	MCH; 31	IOW; 34	DAY; DNQ	KEN; 35	NHA; 35	IND; 32	IOW; 33	GLN; 31		BRI; 29		DAR; 25	RCH; 34	CHI; 37	KEN; 29	DOV; 29	CLT; 36	KAN; 38				38th	236
2016	Timmy Hill	70	Chevy																					MOH; 29		ROA; 23											38th	236
2016	Dexter Stacey	70	Chevy																															TEX; 37	PHO; DNQ	HOM; DNQ	38th	236
2025	Leland Honeyman	70	Chevy	DAY; 21	ATL; 8			LVS; 30	HOM; 34		DAR; 37			TAL; 13		CLT; 32			POC; 24	ATL; 12			DOV; 29	IND; 26			DAY; 26			BRI; 32	KAN; 21			TAL; 8		PHO; 24	31st	368
2025	Thomas Annunziata	70	Chevy			COA; DNQ	PHO; 34			MAR; 31		BRI; 28	CAR; 29		TEX; 34		NSH; 20	MXC; 22			CSC; 17				IOW; 32	GLN; 37		PIR; 28	GTW; 20			ROV; DNQ	LVS; 38		MAR; 38		31st	368
2025	Will Rodgers	70	Chevy																			SON; 16															31st	368

=== Car No. 73 history ===
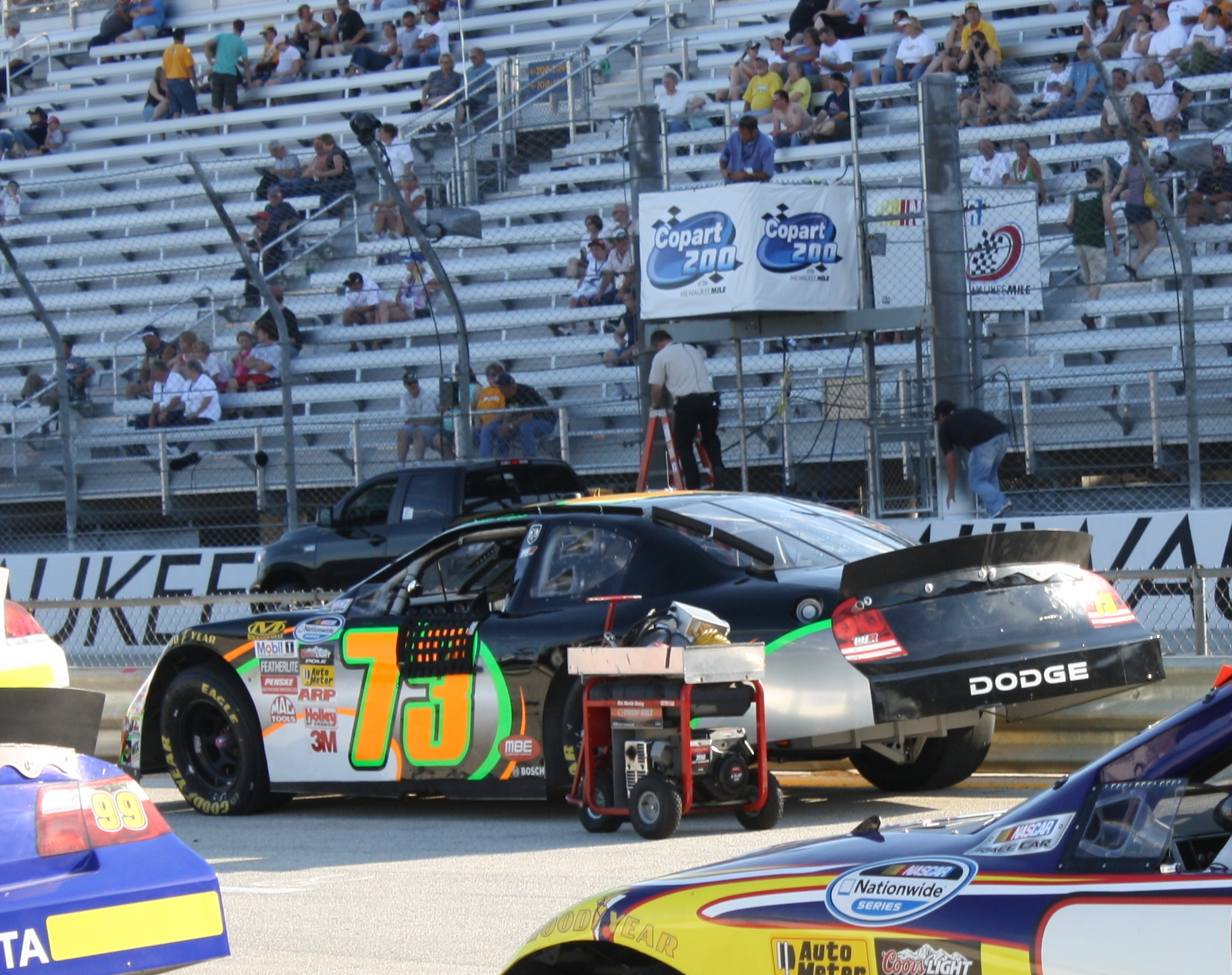
Cope in his No. 73 Nationwide car in 2009

The team made its debut in the NASCAR Nationwide Series in 2008 under the name of Derrike Cope Inc. They fielded the No. 73 Dodge for Larry Gunselman, Kertus Davis, and Kevin Lepage.

In 2009, the team run the No. 73 for Cope, Kevin Lepage, and Chase Miller.

In 2010, the team run the No. 73 for Cope and Johnny Chapman.

In 2011, didn't run the No. 73 Dodge Challenger in the Nationwide Series.

For the 2012 season, Cope changed the name of the team to CFK Motorsports. The team attempted the NNS Daytona race, but failed to make the show. Cope also drove for Robinson-Blakeney Racing. Cope also planned to enter five-seven races in the Sprint Cup Series. Cope once again attempted to qualify at Bristol Motor Speedway, but was knocked out due to being slowest in practice and qualifying. Cope and CFK Motorsports finally made their first race in the 32nd race of the season. Cope started 36th and finished 28th.

CFK returned for a part-time schedule in 2013 under the moniker of Creation-Cope Racing in a Chevy with sponsorship from MAXallence Energy. The team attempted several races with driver Derrike Cope, and only made one with Cope, a race in which they start and parked. They also ran the Mid-Ohio race with Alx Danielsson and dropped out due to a suspension failure after 35 laps.

==== Car No. 73 results ====
Year	Driver	No.	Make	1	2	3	4	5	6	7	8	9	10	11	12	13	14	15	16	17	18	19	20	21	22	23	24	25	26	27	28	29	30	31	32	33	34	35	Owners	Pts
2008	Larry Gunselman	73	Dodge	DAY	CAL	LVS	ATL	BRI	NSH	TEX	PHO	MXC	TAL	RCH	DAR	CLT	DOV	NSH	KEN; 41																				53rd	404
2008	Kertus Davis	73	Dodge																	MLW; 42	NHA	DAY	CHI	GTY	IRP	CGV	GLN												53rd	404
2008	Kevin Lepage	73	Dodge																									MCH; 41	BRI; 41	CAL; 41	RCH	DOV; 39	KAN; 43	CLT; 39	MEM; 43	TEX; 41	PHO; DNQ	HOM; DNQ	53rd	404
2009	Kevin Lepage	73	Dodge	DAY	CAL	LVS	BRI; 36	TEX	NSH	PHO	TAL													IOW; 39	GLN	MCH; DNQ													46th	894
2009	Derrike Cope	73	Dodge									RCH; 22	DAR; DNQ	CLT; 34	DOV	NSH	KEN; 22	MLW; 40	NHA; 37	DAY	CHI; 36	GTY; 38	IRP				BRI; 26	CGV	ATL; DNQ	RCH; DNQ	DOV	KAN; DNQ	CAL; 39	CLT; DNQ					46th	894
2009	Chase Miller	73	Dodge																																MEM; 39	TEX	PHO	HOM	46th	894
2010	Derrike Cope	73	Dodge	DAY; DNQ	CAL; 36	LVS; DNQ	BRI; 28	NSH; 26	PHO; 37	TEX; DNQ	TAL; DNQ	RCH; 42	DAR; 42		CLT; DNQ	NSH; 41	KEN; 26	ROA	NHA	DAY; 38	CHI	GTY; DNQ	IRP	IOW	GLN	MCH; 39	BRI; 39	CGV	ATL	RCH; 42	DOV; 34	KAN	CAL	CLT	GTY	TEX	PHO	HOM	46th	905
2010	Johnny Chapman	73	Dodge											DOV; 39																									46th	905
2012	Derrike Cope	73	Chevy	DAY; DNQ	PHO	LVS	BRI; DNQ	CAL	TEX	RCH	TAL	DAR	IOW	CLT	DOV	MCH	ROA	KEN	DAY	NHA	CHI	IND	IOW	GLN	CGV	BRI	ATL	RCH	CHI	KEN	DOV	CLT	KAN	TEX	PHO; 24	HOM			61st	20
2013	Derrike Cope	73	Chevy	DAY	PHO	LVS	BRI	CAL	TEX	RCH	TAL	DAR; DNQ	CLT	DOV	IOW	MCH	ROA	KEN; 39	DAY	NHA	CHI	IND	IOW	GLN				RCH; DNQ	CHI	KEN	DOV	KAN	CLT; DNQ	TEX	PHO	HOM			62nd	12
2013	Alx Danielsson	73	Chevy																						MOH; 37	BRI	ATL												62nd	12

=== Car No. 78 history ===
In 2008, the team attempted to run a second car, No. 78 with multiple drivers such as Nick Tucker, Johnny Sauter, Jennifer Jo Cobb, Jason White, and Cope.

==== Car No. 78 results ====
Year	Driver	No.	Make	1	2	3	4	5	6	7	8	9	10	11	12	13	14	15	16	17	18	19	20	21	22	23	24	25	26	27	28	29	30	31	32	33	34	35	Owners	Pts
2008	Nick Tucker	78	Dodge	DAY	CAL	LVS	ATL	BRI	NSH	TEX	PHO	MXC	TAL	RCH	DAR	CLT	DOV	NSH	KEN	MLW	NHA	DAY	CHI	GTY	IRP	CGV	GLN	MCH	BRI; DNQ										58th	248
2008	Johnny Sauter	78	Chevy																											CAL; 42	RCH								58th	248
2008	Johnny Sauter	78	Dodge																													DOV; 40		CLT; DNQ	MEM; 41	TEX; DNQ			58th	248
2008	Jennifer Jo Cobb	78	Dodge																														KAN; 30						58th	248
2008	Jason White	78	Dodge																																		PHO; DNQ		58th	248
2008	Derrike Cope	78	Dodge																																			HOM; DNQ	58th	248

=== Car No. 79 history ===
In 2009, the team attempted to run the No. 79 Dodge at Kansas Speedway for Jennifer Jo Cobb. The team missed the race.

==== Car No. 79 results ====
Year	Driver	No.	Make	1	2	3	4	5	6	7	8	9	10	11	12	13	14	15	16	17	18	19	20	21	22	23	24	25	26	27	28	29	30	31	32	33	34	35	Owners	Pts
2009	Jennifer Jo Cobb	79	Dodge	DAY	CAL	LVS	BRI	TEX	NSH	PHO	TAL	RCH	DAR	CLT	DOV	NSH	KEN	MLW	NHA	DAY	CHI	GTY	IRP	IOW	GLN	MCH	BRI	CGV	ATL	RCH	DOV	KAN; DNQ	CAL	CLT	MEM	TEX	PHO	HOM	64th	0

== Camping World Truck Series ==
=== Truck No. 37 history ===
The team made its debut in the NASCAR Craftsman Truck Series in 2001 fielding the No. 37 Ford for Damon Lusk at Texas.

In 2002, the No. 37 truck made a return at season opener at Daytona with Matt Mullins as the driver.

==== Truck No. 37 results ====
Year	Driver	No.	Make	1	2	3	4	5	6	7	8	9	10	11	12	13	14	15	16	17	18	19	20	21	22	23	24	Owners	Pts
2001	Damon Lusk	37	Ford	DAY	HOM	MMR	MAR	GTY	DAR	PPR	DOV	TEX	MEM	MLW	KAN	KEN	NHA	IRP	NSH	CIC	NZH	RCH	SBO	TEX; 11	LVS	PHO	CAL	(Note: unknown)	
2002	Matt Mullins	37	Ford	DAY; 16	DAR	MAR	GTY	PPR	DOV	TEX	MEM	MLW	KAN	KEN	NHA	MCH	IRP	NSH	RCH	TEX	SBO	LVS	CAL	PHO	HOM				

=== Truck No. 73 history ===
In 2008, Stratus fielded the No. 73 truck in the Camping World Truck Series. Multiple drivers such Michelle Theriault, Nick Tucker, Rick Markle, Larry Gunselman, and Robert Bruce.

In 2009, Jennifer Jo Cobb run the No. 73 truck at Kansas.

==== Truck No. 73 results ====
Year	Driver	No.	Make	1	2	3	4	5	6	7	8	9	10	11	12	13	14	15	16	17	18	19	20	21	22	23	24	25	Owners	Pts
2008	Michelle Theriault	73	Dodge	DAY	CAL	ATL	MAR	KAN; 35																					45th	284
2008	Nick Tucker	73	Dodge						CLT; DNQ	MFD	DOV; 35	TEX; 33					IRP; 32	NSH	BRI	GTW	NHA	LVS	TAL						45th	284
2008	Rick Markle	73	Dodge										MCH; 33																45th	284
2008	Larry Gunselman	73	Dodge											MLW; 34	MEM	KEN													45th	284
2008	Robert Bruce	73	Dodge																					MAR; DNQ	ATL	TEX	PHO	HOM	45th	284
2009	Jennifer Jo Cobb	73	Dodge	DAY	CAL	ATL	MAR	KAN; 26	CLT	DOV	TEX	MCH	MLW	MEM	KEN	IRP	NSH	BRI	CHI	IOW	GTW	NHA	LVS	MAR	TAL	TEX	PHO	HOM	72nd	85

=== Truck No. 74 history ===
In 2008, Stratus fielded the No. 74 truck in the Camping World Truck Series. Multiple drivers such Jennifer Jo Cobb, Cope, Larry Gunselman, and Nick Tucker.

In 2009, Larry Foyt run the No. 74 truck at Daytona.

In 2010, Cope run the No. 74 truck at Daytona.

==== Truck No. 74 results ====
Year	Driver	No.	Make	1	2	3	4	5	6	7	8	9	10	11	12	13	14	15	16	17	18	19	20	21	22	23	24	25	Owners	Pts
2008	Jennifer Jo Cobb	74	Dodge	DAY	CAL	ATL	MAR	KAN; 33								KEN; 26													38th	396
2008	Derrike Cope	74	Dodge						CLT; 36	MFD							IRP; 33	NSH	BRI	GTW	NHA	LVS	TAL						38th	396
2008	Larry Gunselman	74	Dodge								DOV; 34	TEX; 35																	38th	396
2008	Nick Tucker	74	Dodge										MCH; 31	MLW; 33	MEM									MAR; 35	ATL	TEX	PHO	HOM	38th	396
2009	Larry Foyt	74	Dodge	DAY; 20	CAL	ATL	MAR	KAN	CLT	DOV	TEX	MCH	MLW	MEM	KEN	IRP	NSH	BRI	CHI	IOW	GTW	NHA	LVS	MAR	TAL	TEX	PHO	HOM	68th	103
2010	Derrike Cope	74	Dodge	DAY; DNQ	ATL	MAR	NSH	KAN	DOV	CLT	TEX	MCH	IOW	GTW	IRP	POC	NSH	DAR	BRI	CHI	KEN; DNQ	NHA	LVS	MAR	TAL	TEX	PHO	HOM	66th	95

== ARCA Racing Series ==
=== Car No. 14 history ===
In 2009, the team fielded the No. 14 Dodge for Nur Ali at Rockingham. He finished 21st.

==== Car No. 14 results ====
Year	Driver	No.	Make	1	2	3	4	5	6	7	8	9	10	11	12	13	14	15	16	17	18	19	20	21	Owners	Pts
2009	Nur Ali	14	Dodge	DAY	SLM	CAR; 21	TAL	KEN	TOL	POC	MCH	MFD	IOW	KEN	BLN	POC	ISF	CHI	TOL	DSF	NJE	SLM	KAN	CAR		

=== Car No. 17 history ===
In 2009, the team fielded the No. 17 Dodge for Nur Ali at Michigan. He finished 35th.

==== Car No. 17 results ====
Year	Driver	No.	Make	1	2	3	4	5	6	7	8	9	10	11	12	13	14	15	16	17	18	19	20	21	Owners	Pts
2009	Nur Ali	17	Dodge	DAY	SLM	CAR	TAL	KEN	TOL	POC	MCH; 35	MFD	IOW	KEN	BLN	POC	ISF	CHI	TOL	DSF	NJE	SLM	KAN	CAR		

=== Car No. 68 history ===
In 2008, the team the No. 68 Dodge in partnership with Rick Markle at Chicagoland for Jennifer Jo Cobb. She started 41st and finished 19th.

==== Car No. 68 results ====
Year	Driver	No.	Make	1	2	3	4	5	6	7	8	9	10	11	12	13	14	15	16	17	18	19	20	21	Owners	Pts
2008	Jennifer Jo Cobb	68	Dodge	DAY	SLM	IOW	KAN	CAR	KEN	TOL	POC	MCH	CAY	KEN	BLN	POC	NSH	ISF	DSF	CHI; 19	SLM	NJE	TAL	TOL		

=== Car No. 70 history ===
In 2008, the team made its debut in ARCA Re/Max Series fielding the No. 70 Dodge for Cope's niece Amber Cope at Kentucky. She started 15th and finished 38th after crash. Amber made one more start that season at Chicagoland where she started 26th and finished 29th.

==== Car No. 70 results ====
Year	Driver	No.	Make	1	2	3	4	5	6	7	8	9	10	11	12	13	14	15	16	17	18	19	20	21	Owners	Pts
2008	Amber Cope	70	Dodge	DAY	SLM	IOW	KAN	CAR	KEN	TOL	POC	MCH	CAY	KEN; 38	BLN	POC	NSH	ISF	DSF	CHI; 29	SLM	NJE	TAL	TOL		

=== Car No. 74 history ===
In 2012, the team fielded the No. 74 Chevrolet for Garrett Smithley at Pocono and Kentucky.

==== Car No. 74 results ====
Year	Driver	No.	Make	1	2	3	4	5	6	7	8	9	10	11	12	13	14	15	16	17	18	19	20	21	Owners	Pts
2013	Garrett Smithley	74	Chevy	DAY	MOB	SLM	TAL	TOL	ELK	POC; 17	MCH	ROA	WIN	CHI	NJE	POC; 14	BLN	ISF	MAD	DSF	IOW	SLM	KEN; 26	KAN		

=== Car No. 97 history ===
In 2012, the team formed a partnership with Carter 2 Motorsports to field the No. 97 Dodge for British racer Jack Clarke at Salem

==== Car No. 97 results ====
Year	Driver	No.	Make	1	2	3	4	5	6	7	8	9	10	11	12	13	14	15	16	17	18	19	20	Owners	Pts
2012	Jack Clarke	97	Dodge	DAY	MOB	SLM; 30	TAL	TOL	ELK	POC	MCH	WIN	NJE	IOW	CHI	IRP	POC	BLN	ISF	MAD	SLM	DSF	KAN		

Footnotes
