= Lance Fenton =

American racing driver

- Born: March 12, 1977 (age 49); McAlester, Oklahoma, U.S.

NASCAR FedEx Freight Truck Series career
- 6 races run over 2 years
- Best finish: 55th (2010)
- First race: 2010 Kroger 250 (Martinsville)
- Last race: 2011 Smith's 350 (Las Vegas)
Wins	Top tens	Poles
0	0	0

ARCA Menards Series career
- 2 races run over 2 years
- Best finish: 127th (2008)
- First race: 2008 Chicagoland ARCA 200 (Chicagoland)
- Last race: 2009 Kansas Lottery 150 (Kansas)
Wins	Top tens	Poles
0	0	0
- Statistics up to date as of March 6, 2024.

Lance Fenton (born March 12, 1977) is an American professional auto racing driver and team owner who has previously competed in the NASCAR Craftsman Truck Series, and the ARCA Racing Series.

== Racing career ==
Fenton made his debut in the ARCA Re/Max Series in 2008 at Chicagoland Speedway, driving the No. 85 Dodge for Greg Barnhart, where he started 27th and finish six laps down in 24th. He then made another start the following year, this time at Kansas Speedway with his own No. 85, where he finished in 22nd after starting in 40th and last.

In 2010, it was announced that Fenton would run up to seven races in the NASCAR Camping World Truck Series for the newly formed Team Gill Racing in the No. 95 Dodge, splitting the ride between former series champion Johnny Benson. Fenton later attempted to make the ARCA race at Daytona International Speedway with the team, but failed to qualify. He then made his official Truck Series debut at Martinsville Speedway, where he started and finished in 34th due to a crash. He then failed to qualify for the next race at Nashville Superspeedway before being released by the team. He would not make another start that year until August, where he drove the No. 47 Chevrolet for Rick Ware Racing at Darlington Raceway, where he finished in nineteenth after starting 33rd. He then made one more start in the No. 47 at Chicagoland before switching to the No. 6 for two races at Las Vegas Motor Speedway, where he finished in 31st due to suspension issues, and at Texas Motor Speedway, where he finished 27th.

In 2011, Fenton and Bob Leavine formed Leavine Fenton Racing, which planned to compete on a limited basis in the NASCAR Sprint Cup Series and Truck Series, with David Starr competing in the former for six events and Fenton driving in the latter for three. However, following the Sprint Showdown and Coca-Cola 600 at Charlotte Motor Speedway, the team announced that Fenton's share in the team had been acquired by Leavine and his wife, Sharon; the team was renamed as Leavine Family Racing. Fenton had not attempted any Truck Series events before leaving the team. He then made a lone Truck Series start at Las Vegas, driving the No. 65 Chevrolet for Tagsby Racing, where he finished 32nd after seven laps due to engine issues. He has not competed in NASCAR since then, as he has since ran in various sports car events like the Super Trofeo North American Series and the Ligier European Series, a series where he finished sixth in his class in 2023.

== Personal life ==
Fenton has two children, Zadie, who competes in horse racing events, and Turbo, who races endurance cars in California.

== Motorsports results ==
=== NASCAR ===
(key) (Bold – Pole position awarded by qualifying time. Italics – Pole position earned by points standings or practice time. * – Most laps led.)

==== Camping World Truck Series ====
NASCAR Camping World Truck Series results
Year	Team	No.	Make	1	2	3	4	5	6	7	8	9	10	11	12	13	14	15	16	17	18	19	20	21	22	23	24	25	NCWTC	Pts	Ref
2010	Team Gill Racing	95	Dodge	DAY	ATL	MAR; 34	NSH; DNQ	KAN	DOV	CLT	TEX	MCH	IOW																55th	407	
2010	Joey Sonntag	65	Chevy											GTY; Wth	IRP	POC	NSH												55th	407	
2010	Rick Ware Racing	47	Chevy															DAR; 19	BRI	CHI; 25	KEN	NHA							55th	407	
2010	Rick Ware Racing	6	Chevy																				LVS; 31	MAR	TAL	TEX; 27	PHO	HOM	55th	407	
2011	Tagsby Racing	65	Chevy	DAY	PHO	DAR	MAR	NSH	DOV	CLT	KAN	TEX	KEN	IOW	NSH	IRP	POC	MCH	BRI	ATL	CHI	NHA	KEN	LVS; 32	TAL	MAR	TEX	HOM	77th	12	

=== ARCA Racing Series ===
(key) (Bold – Pole position awarded by qualifying time. Italics – Pole position earned by points standings or practice time. * – Most laps led.)

ARCA Racing Series results
Year	Team	No.	Make	1	2	3	4	5	6	7	8	9	10	11	12	13	14	15	16	17	18	19	20	21	ARSC	Pts	Ref
2008	Greg Barnhart	85	Dodge	DAY	SLM	IOW	KEN	CAR	KEN	TOL	POC	MCH	CAY	KEN	BLN	POC	NSH	ISF	DSF	CHI; 25	SLM	NJE	TAL	TOL	127th	110	
2009	Lance Fenton Racing	85	Dodge	DAY	SLM	CAR	TAL	KEN	TOL	POC	MCH	MFD	IOW	KEN	BLN	POC	ISF	CHI	TOL	DSF	NJE	SLM	KAN; 22	CAR	130th	120	
2010	Team Gill Racing	85	Dodge	DAY; DNQ	PBE	SLM	TEX	TAL	TOL	POC	MCH	IOW	MFD	POC	BLN	NJE	ISF	CHI	DSF	TOL	SLM	KAN	CAR		N/A	0	
