= 1988 Miller High Life 500 =

13th race of the 1988 NASCAR Winston Cup Series

Race details
- Race 13 of 29 in the 1988 NASCAR Winston Cup Series
- The 1988 Miller High Life 500 program cover, featuring Bobby Hillin Jr. and Bobby Allison.
- Date: June 19, 1988
- Official name: 7th Annual Miller High Life 500
- Location: Long Pond, Pennsylvania, Pocono Raceway
- Course: Permanent racing facility
- Course length: 2.5 miles (4.0 km)
- Distance: 200 laps, 500 mi (804.672 km)
- Scheduled distance: 200 laps, 500 mi (804.672 km)
- Average speed: 126.147 miles per hour (203.014 km/h)
- Attendance: 96,000

Pole position
Driver	Alan Kulwicki	AK Racing
- Time: 56.673

Most laps led
Driver	Geoff Bodine	Hendrick Motorsports
- Laps: 90

Winner
No. 5	Geoff Bodine	Hendrick Motorsports

Television in the United States
- Network: FNN (tape-delayed)
- Announcers: Pat Patterson, Bob Latford

Radio in the United States
- Radio: Motor Racing Network

The 1988 Miller High Life 500 was the 13th stock car race of the 1988 NASCAR Winston Cup Series season and the seventh iteration of the event. The race was held on Sunday, June 19, 1988, before an audience of 96,000 in Long Pond, Pennsylvania, at Pocono Raceway, a 2.5 miles (4.0 km) triangular permanent course. The race took the scheduled 200 laps to complete. At race's end, Hendrick Motorsports driver Geoff Bodine would manage to run the final 42 laps of the race on one tank of fuel to take his sixth career NASCAR Winston Cup Series victory and his only victory of the season. To fill out the top three, Bahari Racing driver Michael Waltrip and Blue Max Racing driver Rusty Wallace would finish second and third, respectively.

On the first lap of the race, a crash involving Stavola Brothers Racing driver Bobby Allison and Linro Motorsports driver Jocko Maggiacomo would occur in the second turn of the speedway. Allison, who had cut a tire before the start of the race, would spin in the second turn while trying to nurse his car to pit road. Maggiacomo, who had started behind Allison, was unable to avoid the spinning Allison and t-boned Allison's car on the driver's side. As a result, Allison would suffer a broken left leg and a cerebral concussion. Allison would eventually recover from his physical injuries, but was left with amnesia after the incident. Maggiacomo, who suffered a fractured left ankle, would retire after the 1988 NASCAR Winston Cup Series season after suffering from PTSD from hitting Allison.

== Background ==
The layout of Pocono International Raceway, the venue where the race was held.

The race was held at Pocono International Raceway, which is a three-turn superspeedway located in Long Pond, Pennsylvania. The track hosts two annual NASCAR Sprint Cup Series races, as well as one Xfinity Series and Camping World Truck Series event. Until 2019, the track also hosted an IndyCar Series race.

Pocono International Raceway is one of a very few NASCAR tracks not owned by either Speedway Motorsports, Inc. or International Speedway Corporation. It is operated by the Igdalsky siblings Brandon, Nicholas, and sister Ashley, and cousins Joseph IV and Chase Mattioli, all of whom are third-generation members of the family-owned Mattco Inc, started by Joseph II and Rose Mattioli.

Outside of the NASCAR races, the track is used throughout the year by the Sports Car Club of America (SCCA) and motorcycle clubs as well as racing schools and an IndyCar race. The triangular oval also has three separate infield sections of racetrack – North Course, East Course and South Course. Each of these infield sections use a separate portion of the tri-oval to complete the track. During regular non-race weekends, multiple clubs can use the track by running on different infield sections. Also some of the infield sections can be run in either direction, or multiple infield sections can be put together – such as running the North Course and the South Course and using the tri-oval to connect the two.

=== Entry list ===
- (R) denotes rookie driver.

#	Driver	Team	Make	Sponsor
2	Ernie Irvan (R)	U.S. Racing	Chevrolet	Kroger
3	Dale Earnhardt	Richard Childress Racing	Chevrolet	GM Goodwrench Service
4	Rick Wilson	Morgan–McClure Motorsports	Oldsmobile	Kodak
5	Geoff Bodine	Hendrick Motorsports	Chevrolet	Levi Garrett
6	Mark Martin	Roush Racing	Ford	Stroh Light
7	Alan Kulwicki	AK Racing	Ford	Zerex
8	Bobby Hillin Jr.	Stavola Brothers Racing	Buick	Miller High Life
9	Bill Elliott	Melling Racing	Ford	Coors Light
10	Ken Bouchard (R)	Whitcomb Racing	Ford	Whitcomb Racing
11	Terry Labonte	Junior Johnson & Associates	Chevrolet	Budweiser
12	Bobby Allison	Stavola Brothers Racing	Buick	Miller High Life
15	Brett Bodine	Bud Moore Engineering	Ford	Crisco
16	Bob Schacht	Chilson Racing	Ford	Ed Learn Ford
17	Darrell Waltrip	Hendrick Motorsports	Chevrolet	Tide
21	Kyle Petty	Wood Brothers Racing	Ford	Citgo
22	Steve Moore	Hamby Racing	Chevrolet	Hamby Racing
23	Eddie Bierschwale	B&B Racing	Oldsmobile	Wayne Paging
25	Ken Schrader	Hendrick Motorsports	Chevrolet	Folgers
26	Ricky Rudd	King Racing	Buick	Quaker State
27	Rusty Wallace	Blue Max Racing	Pontiac	Kodiak
28	Davey Allison	Ranier-Lundy Racing	Ford	Havoline
29	Dale Jarrett	Cale Yarborough Motorsports	Oldsmobile	Hardee's
30	Michael Waltrip	Bahari Racing	Pontiac	Country Time
31	Joe Ruttman	Bob Clark Motorsports	Oldsmobile	Slender You Figure Salons
33	Morgan Shepherd	Mach 1 Racing	Chevrolet	Skoal Bandit
43	Richard Petty	Petty Enterprises	Pontiac	STP
44	Sterling Marlin	Hagan Racing	Oldsmobile	Piedmont Airlines
52	Jimmy Means	Jimmy Means Racing	Pontiac	Eureka
55	Phil Parsons	Jackson Bros. Motorsports	Oldsmobile	Crown, Skoal Classic
63	Jocko Maggiacomo	Linro Motorsports	Chevrolet	Linro Motorsports
64	Mike Potter	Potter Racing	Chevrolet	Bullfrog Knits
67	Buddy Arrington	Arrington Racing	Ford	Pannill Sweatshirts
68	Derrike Cope	Testa Racing	Ford	Purolator Filters
70	J. D. McDuffie	McDuffie Racing	Pontiac	Rumple Furniture
71	Dave Marcis	Marcis Auto Racing	Chevrolet	Lifebuoy
75	Neil Bonnett	RahMoc Enterprises	Pontiac	Valvoline
80	Jimmy Horton (R)	S&H Racing	Ford	S&H Racing
83	Lake Speed	Speed Racing	Oldsmobile	Wynn's, Kmart
85	Bobby Gerhart	Bobby Gerhart Racing	Chevrolet	James Chevrolet
88	Buddy Baker	Baker-Schiff Racing	Oldsmobile	Red Baron Frozen Pizza
90	Benny Parsons	Donlavey Racing	Ford	Bull's-Eye Barbecue Sauce
97	Rodney Combs	Winkle Motorsports	Buick	AC Spark Plug
98	Brad Noffsinger (R)	Curb Racing	Buick	Sunoco

== Qualifying ==
Qualifying was split into two rounds. The first round was held on Friday, June 17, at 3:00 p.m. EST. Each driver would have one lap to set a time. During the first round, the top 15 drivers in the round would be guaranteed a starting spot in the race. If a driver was not able to guarantee a spot in the first round, they had the option to scrub their time from the first round and try and run a faster lap time in a second round qualifying run, held on Saturday, June 18, at 10:30 a.m. EST. As with the first round, each driver would have one lap to set a time. For this specific race, positions 16-40 would be decided on time, and depending on who needed it, a select amount of positions were given to cars who had not otherwise qualified but were high enough in owner's points; up to two provisionals were given.

Alan Kulwicki, driving for his own AK Racing team, would win the pole, setting a time of 56.673 and an average speed of 158.806 miles per hour (255.573 km/h) in the first round.

Three drivers would fail to qualify.

=== Full qualifying results ===
Pos.	#	Driver	Team	Make	Time	Speed
1	7	Alan Kulwicki	AK Racing	Ford	56.673	158.806
2	25	Ken Schrader	Hendrick Motorsports	Chevrolet	56.870	158.256
3	5	Geoff Bodine	Hendrick Motorsports	Chevrolet	56.908	158.150
4	9	Bill Elliott	Melling Racing	Ford	57.344	156.948
5	11	Terry Labonte	Junior Johnson & Associates	Chevrolet	57.376	156.860
6	28	Davey Allison	Ranier-Lundy Racing	Ford	57.626	156.180
7	75	Neil Bonnett	RahMoc Enterprises	Pontiac	57.654	156.104
8	4	Rick Wilson	Morgan–McClure Motorsports	Oldsmobile	57.695	155.993
9	17	Darrell Waltrip	Hendrick Motorsports	Chevrolet	57.711	155.949
10	26	Ricky Rudd	King Racing	Buick	57.735	155.885
11	55	Phil Parsons	Jackson Bros. Motorsports	Oldsmobile	57.737	155.879
12	83	Lake Speed	Speed Racing	Oldsmobile	57.816	155.666
13	43	Richard Petty	Petty Enterprises	Pontiac	57.835	155.615
14	21	Kyle Petty	Wood Brothers Racing	Ford	57.905	155.427
15	6	Mark Martin	Roush Racing	Ford	57.933	155.352
Failed to lock in Round 1
16	15	Brett Bodine	Bud Moore Engineering	Ford	57.688	156.012
17	27	Rusty Wallace	Blue Max Racing	Pontiac	57.984	155.215
18	3	Dale Earnhardt	Richard Childress Racing	Chevrolet	57.990	155.199
19	33	Morgan Shepherd	Mach 1 Racing	Chevrolet	58.040	155.065
20	29	Dale Jarrett	Cale Yarborough Motorsports	Oldsmobile	58.063	155.004
21	44	Sterling Marlin	Hagan Racing	Oldsmobile	58.177	154.700
22	8	Bobby Hillin Jr.	Stavola Brothers Racing	Buick	58.211	154.610
23	90	Benny Parsons	Donlavey Racing	Ford	58.303	154.366
24	2	Ernie Irvan (R)	U.S. Racing	Chevrolet	58.457	153.959
25	88	Buddy Baker	Baker–Schiff Racing	Oldsmobile	58.535	153.754
26	97	Rodney Combs	Winkle Motorsports	Buick	58.623	153.523
27	31	Joe Ruttman	Bob Clark Motorsports	Oldsmobile	58.624	153.521
28	12	Bobby Allison	Stavola Brothers Racing	Buick	58.663	153.419
29	10	Ken Bouchard (R)	Whitcomb Racing	Ford	58.668	153.406
30	30	Michael Waltrip	Bahari Racing	Pontiac	58.693	153.340
31	98	Brad Noffsinger (R)	Curb Racing	Buick	58.704	153.312
32	80	Jimmy Horton (R)	S&H Racing	Ford	58.752	153.186
33	71	Dave Marcis	Marcis Auto Racing	Chevrolet	58.930	152.724
34	68	Derrike Cope	Testa Racing	Ford	59.033	152.457
35	23	Eddie Bierschwale	B&B Racing	Oldsmobile	59.171	152.102
36	52	Jimmy Means	Jimmy Means Racing	Pontiac	59.185	152.066
37	16	Bob Schacht	Chilson Racing	Ford	59.588	151.037
38	63	Jocko Maggiacomo	Linro Motorsports	Chevrolet	59.620	150.956
39	67	Buddy Arrington	Arrington Racing	Ford	59.666	150.840
40	85	Bobby Gerhart	Bobby Gerhart Racing	Chevrolet	1:00.140	149.651
Failed to qualify
41	70	J. D. McDuffie	McDuffie Racing	Pontiac	-*	-*
42	64	Mike Potter	Potter Racing	Chevrolet	-*	-*
43	22	Steve Moore	Hamby Racing	Chevrolet	-*	-*
Official first round qualifying results
Official starting lineup

== Race results ==
Fin	St	#	Driver	Team	Make	Laps	Led	Status	Pts	Winnings
1	3	5	Geoff Bodine	Hendrick Motorsports	Chevrolet	200	90	running	185	$51,200
2	30	30	Michael Waltrip	Bahari Racing	Pontiac	200	1	running	175	$31,100
3	17	27	Rusty Wallace	Blue Max Racing	Pontiac	200	23	running	170	$26,500
4	15	6	Mark Martin	Roush Racing	Ford	200	6	running	165	$15,080
5	6	28	Davey Allison	Ranier-Lundy Racing	Ford	200	0	running	155	$20,925
6	9	17	Darrell Waltrip	Hendrick Motorsports	Chevrolet	200	0	running	150	$13,625
7	25	88	Buddy Baker	Baker–Schiff Racing	Oldsmobile	200	0	running	146	$11,600
8	11	55	Phil Parsons	Jackson Bros. Motorsports	Oldsmobile	200	3	running	147	$9,700
9	2	25	Ken Schrader	Hendrick Motorsports	Chevrolet	200	68	running	143	$13,480
10	4	9	Bill Elliott	Melling Racing	Ford	200	0	running	134	$15,460
11	7	75	Neil Bonnett	RahMoc Enterprises	Pontiac	199	0	running	130	$11,490
12	14	21	Kyle Petty	Wood Brothers Racing	Ford	199	0	running	127	$11,270
13	20	29	Dale Jarrett	Cale Yarborough Motorsports	Oldsmobile	199	0	running	124	$5,950
14	29	10	Ken Bouchard (R)	Whitcomb Racing	Ford	199	0	running	121	$4,550
15	22	8	Bobby Hillin Jr.	Stavola Brothers Racing	Buick	199	0	running	118	$7,875
16	19	33	Morgan Shepherd	Mach 1 Racing	Chevrolet	198	0	running	115	$7,060
17	27	31	Joe Ruttman	Bob Clark Motorsports	Oldsmobile	197	0	running	112	$4,655
18	32	80	Jimmy Horton (R)	S&H Racing	Ford	196	0	running	109	$3,500
19	31	98	Brad Noffsinger (R)	Curb Racing	Buick	196	0	running	106	$3,115
20	36	52	Jimmy Means	Jimmy Means Racing	Pontiac	194	0	running	103	$6,635
21	39	67	Buddy Arrington	Arrington Racing	Ford	192	0	running	0	$4,880
22	40	85	Bobby Gerhart	Bobby Gerhart Racing	Chevrolet	190	0	running	97	$2,775
23	12	83	Lake Speed	Speed Racing	Oldsmobile	187	0	running	94	$3,670
24	34	68	Derrike Cope	Testa Racing	Ford	187	0	running	91	$6,190
25	8	4	Rick Wilson	Morgan–McClure Motorsports	Oldsmobile	148	0	running	88	$3,510
26	13	43	Richard Petty	Petty Enterprises	Pontiac	147	9	crash	90	$5,255
27	1	7	Alan Kulwicki	AK Racing	Ford	127	0	engine	82	$7,650
28	21	44	Sterling Marlin	Hagan Racing	Oldsmobile	118	0	engine	79	$5,070
29	35	23	Eddie Bierschwale	B&B Racing	Oldsmobile	111	0	camshaft	76	$2,340
30	10	26	Ricky Rudd	King Racing	Buick	105	0	engine	73	$4,935
31	23	90	Benny Parsons	Donlavey Racing	Ford	100	0	crash	70	$4,855
32	5	11	Terry Labonte	Junior Johnson & Associates	Chevrolet	98	0	engine	67	$9,175
33	18	3	Dale Earnhardt	Richard Childress Racing	Chevrolet	93	0	engine	64	$13,045
34	26	97	Rodney Combs	Winkle Motorsports	Buick	54	0	engine	61	$2,030
35	16	15	Brett Bodine	Bud Moore Engineering	Ford	27	0	engine	58	$12,075
36	37	16	Bob Schacht	Chilson Racing	Ford	22	0	engine	55	$1,920
37	24	2	Ernie Irvan (R)	U.S. Racing	Chevrolet	12	0	crash	52	$1,865
38	33	71	Dave Marcis	Marcis Auto Racing	Chevrolet	11	0	engine	49	$4,435
39	28	12	Bobby Allison	Stavola Brothers Racing	Buick	0	0	crash	46	$9,805
40	38	63	Jocko Maggiacomo	Linro Motorsports	Chevrolet	0	0	crash	43	$1,750
Failed to qualify
41		70	J. D. McDuffie	McDuffie Racing	Pontiac					
42		64	Mike Potter	Potter Racing	Chevrolet					
43		22	Steve Moore	Hamby Racing	Chevrolet					
Official race results

== Standings after the race ==
Drivers' Championship standings

	Pos	Driver	Points
	1	Rusty Wallace	1,960
	2	Dale Earnhardt	1,850 (-110)
1	3	Bill Elliott	1,820 (-140)
1	4	Terry Labonte	1,769 (–191)
	5	Sterling Marlin	1,756 (–204)
1	6	Ken Schrader	1,674 (–286)
2	7	Geoff Bodine	1,659 (–301)
2	8	Bobby Allison	1,654 (–306)
1	9	Phil Parsons	1,616 (–344)
2	10	Bobby Hillin Jr.	1,596 (–364)
Official driver's standings

- Note: Only the first 10 positions are included for the driver standings.

Previous race: 1988 Budweiser 400	NASCAR Winston Cup Series; 1988 season	Next race: 1988 Miller High Life 400 (Michigan)
