= 2016 PowerShares QQQ 300 =

1st race of the 2016 NASCAR Xfinity Series

Race details
- Race 1 of 33 in the 2016 NASCAR Xfinity Series
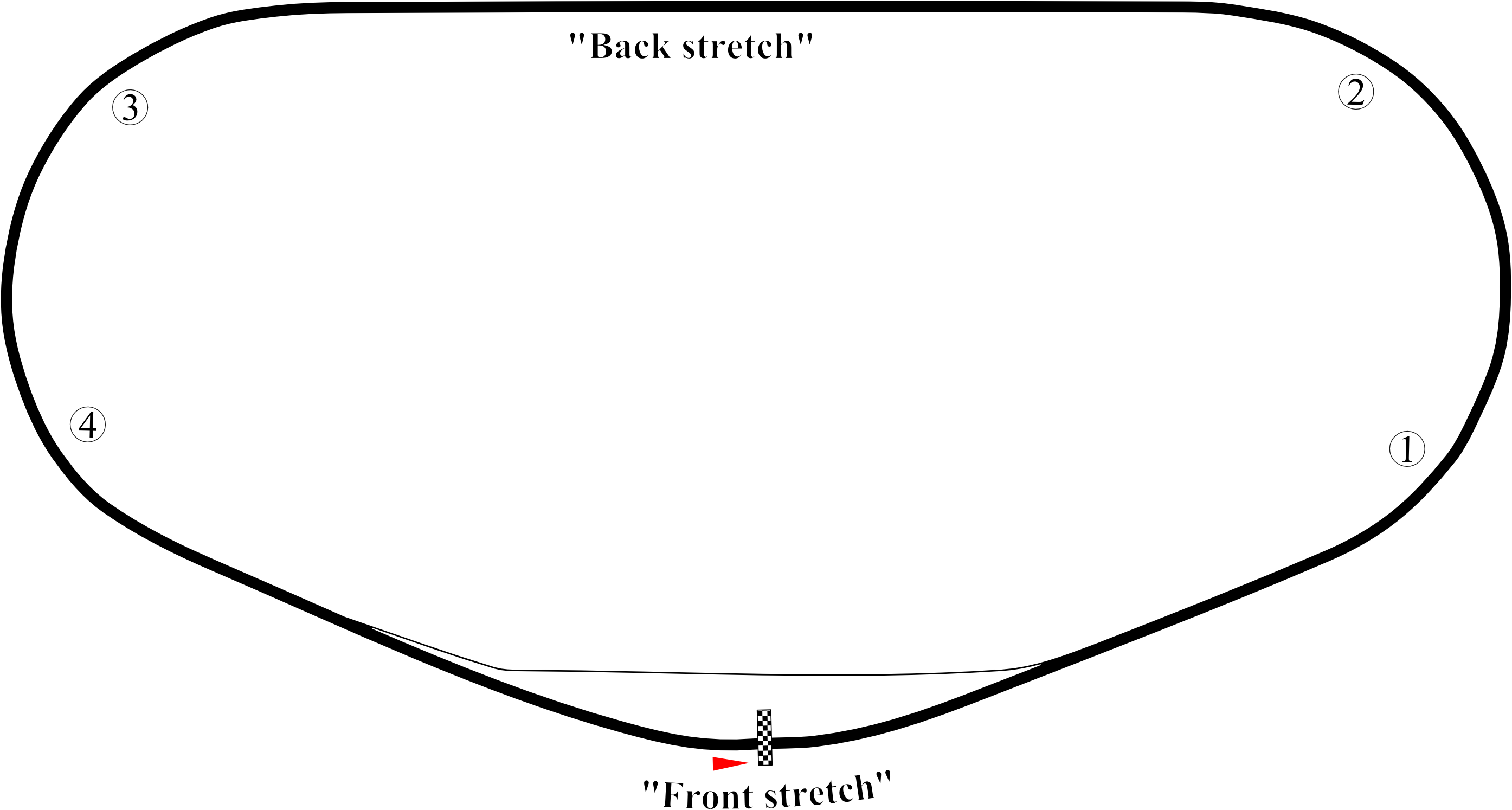
- Date: February 20, 2016
- Official name: 35th annual PowerShares QQQ 300
- Location: Daytona Beach, Florida, Daytona International Speedway
- Course: Permanent racing facility
- Course length: 2.50 miles (4.02 km)
- Distance: 120 laps, 300.00 mi (482.803 km)
- Scheduled distance: 120 laps, 300.00 mi (482.803 km)
- Average speed: 151.176 miles per hour (243.294 km/h)

Pole position
Driver	Ty Dillon	Richard Childress Racing
- Time: 151.176

Most laps led
Driver	Joey Logano	Team Penske
- Laps: 40

Winner
No. 88	Chase Elliott	JR Motorsports

Television in the United States
- Network: FS1
- Announcers: Adam Alexander, Kevin Harvick, Michael Waltrip

Radio in the United States
- Radio: Performance Racing Network

The 2016 PowerShares QQQ 300 was the 1st stock car race of the 2016 NASCAR Xfinity Series season and the 35th iteration of the event. The race was held on Saturday, February 20, 2016, in Daytona Beach, Florida, at Daytona International Speedway a 2.5 miles (4.02 km) permanent triangular-shaped superspeedway. The race took the scheduled 120 laps to complete. At race's end, Chase Elliott, driving for JR Motorsports, held off a hard-charging Joey Logano to earn his 5th career NASCAR Xfinity Series win and his first of the season. To fill out the podium, Logano of Team Penske and Kasey Kahne of JR Motorsports would finish second and third, respectively.

== Background ==
Daytona International Speedway is one of three superspeedways to hold NASCAR races, the other two being Indianapolis Motor Speedway and Talladega Superspeedway. The standard track at Daytona International Speedway is a four-turn superspeedway that is 2.5 miles (4.0 km) long. The track's turns are banked at 31 degrees, while the front stretch, the location of the finish line, is banked at 18 degrees.

=== Entry list ===
- (R) denotes rookie driver.
- (i) denotes driver who is ineligible for series driver points.

#	Driver	Team	Make
0	Eric McClure	JD Motorsports	Chevrolet
1	Elliott Sadler	JR Motorsports	Chevrolet
01	Ryan Preece (R)	JD Motorsports	Chevrolet
2	Austin Dillon (i)	Richard Childress Racing	Chevrolet
3	Ty Dillon	Richard Childress Racing	Chevrolet
4	Ross Chastain	JD Motorsports	Chevrolet
5	Kasey Kahne (i)	JR Motorsports	Chevrolet
05	John Wes Townley (i)	Athenian Motorsports	Chevrolet
6	Bubba Wallace	Roush Fenway Racing	Ford
7	Justin Allgaier	JR Motorsports	Chevrolet
07	Ray Black Jr. (R)	SS-Green Light Racing	Chevrolet
11	Blake Koch	Kaulig Racing	Chevrolet
13	Mark Thompson	MBM Motorsports	Toyota
14	Benny Gordon	TriStar Motorsports	Toyota
15	Stanton Barrett	Rick Ware Racing	Dodge
16	Ryan Reed	Roush Fenway Racing	Ford
17	Jeff Green	Rick Ware Racing	Chevrolet
18	Bobby Labonte (i)	Joe Gibbs Racing	Toyota
19	Daniel Suárez	Joe Gibbs Racing	Toyota
20	Erik Jones (R)	Joe Gibbs Racing	Toyota
22	Joey Logano (i)	Team Penske	Ford
24	Matt Tifft (i)	JGL Racing	Toyota
25	Chris Cockrum	Chris Cockrum Racing	Chevrolet
28	Dakoda Armstrong	JGL Racing	Toyota
33	Brandon Jones (R)	Richard Childress Racing	Chevrolet
39	Ryan Sieg	RSS Racing	Chevrolet
40	Derek White	MBM Motorsports	Dodge
42	Kyle Larson (i)	Chip Ganassi Racing	Chevrolet
48	Brennan Poole	Chip Ganassi Racing	Chevrolet
43	Jeb Burton	Richard Petty Motorsports	Ford
44	David Starr	TriStar Motorsports	Toyota
46	Anthony Kumpen	Precision Performance Motorsports	Chevrolet
48	Brennan Poole (R)	Chip Ganassi Racing	Chevrolet
51	Jeremy Clements	Jeremy Clements Racing	Chevrolet
52	Joey Gase	Jimmy Means Racing	Chevrolet
62	Brendan Gaughan	Richard Childress Racing	Chevrolet
70	Derrike Cope	Derrike Cope Racing	Chevrolet
74	Mike Harmon	Mike Harmon Racing	Dodge
78	B. J. McLeod (R)	B. J. McLeod Motorsports	Ford
85	Bobby Gerhart	Gerhart Racing	Chevrolet
87	Joe Nemechek (i)	NEMCO Motorsports	Toyota
88	Chase Elliott (i)	JR Motorsports	Chevrolet
89	Morgan Shepherd	Shepherd Racing Ventures	Chevrolet
90	Martin Roy	King Autosport	Chevrolet
92	Mario Gosselin	King Autosport	Chevrolet
93	Scott Lagasse Jr.	RSS Racing	Chevrolet
97	Harrison Rhodes	Obaika Racing	Chevrolet
98	Aric Almirola (i)	Biagi-DenBeste Racing	Ford
99	Chris Fontaine (i)	B. J. McLeod Motorsports	Ford
Official entry list

== Practice ==
=== First practice ===
The first practice session was held on Friday, February 19 at 11:00 AM EST. Ty Dillon of Richard Childress Racing would set the fastest time in the session, with a lap of 46.747 and an average speed of 192.526 mph (309.841 km/h).

Pos.	#	Driver	Team	Make	Time	Speed
1	3	Ty Dillon	Richard Childress Racing	Chevrolet	46.747	192.526
2	11	Blake Koch	Kaulig Racing	Chevrolet	46.884	191.963
3	2	Austin Dillon (i)	Richard Childress Racing	Chevrolet	86.897	191.910
Full first practice results

=== Second practice ===
The second practice session was held on Friday, February 19 at 1:00 PM EST. David Starr of TriStar Motorsports would set the fastest time in the session, with a lap of 49.042 and an average speed of 183.516 mph (295.340 km/h).

Pos.	#	Driver	Team	Make	Time	Speed
1	44	David Starr	TriStar Motorsports	Toyota	49.042	183.516
2	33	Brandon Jones	Richard Childress Racing	Chevrolet	49.151	183.109
3	87	Joe Nemechek (i)	NEMCO Motorsports	Toyota	49.171	183.035
Full first practice results

=== Third and final practice ===
The final practice session, sometimes referred to as Happy Hour, was held on Friday, July 14, at 3:00 PM EST. Ty Dillon of Richard Childress Racing would set the fastest time in the session, with a lap of 49.420 and an average speed of 182.113 mph (293.082 km/h).

Pos.	#	Driver	Team	Make	Time	Speed
1	3	Ty Dillon	Richard Childress Racing	Chevrolet	49.420	182.113
2	07	Ray Black Jr. (R)	SS-Green Light Racing	Chevrolet	49.667	181.207
3	43	Jeb Burton	Richard Petty Motorsports	Ford	49.689	181.127
Full Happy Hour practice results

== Qualifying ==
Qualifying was held on Saturday, February 20, at 11:00 AM EST. Since Daytona International Speedway is at least 2 miles (3.2 km), the qualifying system was a single car, single lap, two round system where in the first round, everyone would set a time to determine positions 13-40. Then, the fastest 12 qualifiers would move on to the second round to determine positions 1-12.

Ty Dillon of Richard Childress Racing would win the pole after advancing from the preliminary round and setting the fastest lap in Round 2, with a time of 49.493 and an average speed of 181.844 mph (292.650 km/h).

Mark Thompson, Mario Gosselin, Harrison Rhodes, Derrike Cope, Chris Fontaine, Derek White, Mike Harmon, and Stanton Barrett failed to qualify.

=== Full qualifying results ===
Pos.	No.	Driver	Team	Make	Time (R1)	Speed (R1)	Time (R2)	Speed (R2)
1	3	Ty Dillon	Richard Childress Racing	Chevrolet	49.506	181.796	49.493	181.844
2	19	Daniel Suárez	Joe Gibbs Racing	Toyota	49.606	181.430	49.612	181.408
3	18	Bobby Labonte (i)	Joe Gibbs Racing	Toyota	49.661	181.229	49.722	181.006
4	2	Austin Dillon (i)	Richard Childress Racing	Chevrolet	49.878	180.440	49.742	180.934
5	20	Erik Jones (R)	Joe Gibbs Racing	Toyota	49.633	181.331	49.771	180.828
6	62	Brendan Gaughan	Richard Childress Racing	Chevrolet	49.913	180.314	49.864	180.491
7	33	Brandon Jones (R)	Richard Childress Racing	Chevrolet	49.866	180.484	49.869	180.473
8	22	Joey Logano (i)	Team Penske	Ford	50.035	179.874	50.005	179.982
9	11	Blake Koch	Kaulig Racing	Chevrolet	50.015	179.946	50.036	179.870
10	1	Elliott Sadler	JR Motorsports	Chevrolet	50.050	179.820	50.063	179.773
11	16	Ryan Reed	Roush Fenway Racing	Ford	30.001	126.956	50.084	179.698
12	6	Bubba Wallace	Roush Fenway Racing	Ford	50.072	179.741	50.263	179.058
Eliminated in Round 1
13	48	Brennan Poole (R)	Chip Ganassi Racing	Chevrolet	50.091	179.673	-	-
14	05	John Wes Townley (i)	Athenian Motorsports	Chevrolet	50.167	179.401	-	-
15	5	Kasey Kahne (i)	JR Motorsports	Chevrolet	50.177	179.365	-	-
16	7	Justin Allgaier	JR Motorsports	Chevrolet	50.185	179.336	-	-
17	42	Kyle Larson (i)	Chip Ganassi Racing	Chevrolet	50.229	179.179	-	-
18	28	Dakoda Armstrong	JGL Racing	Toyota	50.232	179.169	-	-
19	88	Chase Elliott (i)	JR Motorsports	Chevrolet	50.306	178.905	-	-
20	24	Matt Tifft	JGL Racing	Chevrolet	50.312	178.884	-	-
21	43	Jeb Burton	Richard Petty Motorsports	Ford	50.325	178.838	-	-
22	14	Benny Gordon	TriStar Motorsports	Toyota	50.348	178.756	-	-
23	44	David Starr	TriStar Motorsports	Toyota	50.384	178.628	-	-
24	98	Aric Almirola (i)	Biagi-DenBeste Racing	Ford	50.398	178.579	-	-
25	39	Ryan Sieg	RSS Racing	Chevrolet	50.438	178.437	-	-
26	89	Morgan Shepherd	Shepherd Racing Ventures	Chevrolet	50.461	178.356	-	-
27	85	Bobby Gerhart	Gerhart Racing	Chevrolet	50.694	177.536	-	-
28	87	Joe Nemechek (i)	NEMCO Motorsports	Toyota	50.733	177.399	-	-
29	46	Anthony Kumpen	Precision Performance Motorsports	Chevrolet	50.747	177.350	-	-
30	93	Scott Lagasse Jr.	RSS Racing	Chevrolet	50.753	177.329	-	-
31	01	Ryan Preece (R)	JD Motorsports	Chevrolet	50.755	177.322	-	-
32	07	Ray Black Jr.	SS-Green Light Racing	Chevrolet	50.771	177.267	-	-
33	0	Eric McClure	JD Motorsports	Chevrolet	50.777	177.246	-	-
Qualified by owner's points
34	90	Martin Roy	King Autosport	Chevrolet	50.957	176.620	-	-
35	25	Chris Cockrum	Chris Cockrum Racing	Chevrolet	50.974	176.561	-	-
36	4	Ross Chastain	JD Motorsports	Chevrolet	51.082	176.187	-	-
37	51	Jeremy Clements	Jeremy Clements Racing	Chevrolet	51.208	175.754	-	-
38	78	B. J. McLeod (R)	B. J. McLeod Motorsports	Ford	51.530	174.656	-	-
39	52	Joey Gase	Jimmy Means Racing	Chevrolet	51.785	173.796	-	-
Qualified by being past champion
40	17	Jeff Green	Rick Ware Racing	Chevrolet	51.019	176.405	-	-
Failed to qualify
41	13	Mark Thompson	MBM Motorsports	Toyota	50.803	177.155	-	-
42	92	Mario Gosselin	King Autosport	Chevrolet	50.857	176.967	-	-
43	97	Harrison Rhodes	JD Motorsports	Chevrolet	51.146	175.967	-	-
44	70	Derrike Cope	Derrike Cope Racing	Chevrolet	51.196	175.795	-	-
45	99	Chris Fontaine (i)	B. J. McLeod Motorsports	Chevrolet	51.208	175.754	-	-
46	40	Derek White	MBM Motorsports	Dodge	51.328	175.343	-	-
47	15	Stanton Barrett	Rick Ware Racing	Dodge	51.754	173.900	-	-
48	74	Mike Harmon	Mike Harmon Racing	Dodge	0.000	0.000	-	-
Official qualifying results
Official starting lineup

== Race results ==
Laps: 120

Finish	No.	Driver	Team	Make	Laps	Led	Status	Pts
1	88	Chase Elliott (i)	JR Motorsports	Chevrolet	120	19	running	0
2	22	Joey Logano (i)	Team Penske	Ford	120	40	running	0
3	5	Kasey Kahne (i)	JR Motorsports	Chevrolet	120	30	running	0
4	1	Elliott Sadler	JR Motorsports	Chevrolet	120	4	running	38
5	2	Austin Dillon (i)	Richard Childress Racing	Chevrolet	120	5	running	0
6	6	Bubba Wallace	Roush Fenway Racing	Ford	120	0	running	35
7	33	Brandon Jones	Richard Childress Racing	Chevrolet	120	0	running	34
8	19	Daniel Suárez	Joe Gibbs Racing	Toyota	120	0	running	33
9	11	Blake Koch	Kaulig Racing	Chevrolet	120	0	running	32
10	62	Brendan Gaughan	Richard Childress Racing	Chevrolet	120	9	running	32
11	98	Aric Almirola (i)	Stewart–Haas Racing	Ford	120	9	running	0
12	7	Justin Allgaier	JR Motorsports	Chevrolet	120	0	running	29
13	3	Ty Dillon	Richard Childress Racing	Chevrolet	120	2	running	29
14	28	Dakoda Armstrong	JGL Racing	Toyota	120	0	running	27
15	51	Jeremy Clements	Jeremy Clements Racing	Chevrolet	119	0	running	26
16	16	Ryan Reed	Roush Fenway Racing	Ford	119	0	running	25
17	05	John Wes Townley (i)	Athenian Motorsports	Chevrolet	119	0	running	0
18	44	David Starr	TriStar Motorsports	Toyota	119	0	running	23
19	87	Joe Nemechek (i)	NEMCO Motorsports	Toyota	119	2	running	0
20	39	Ryan Sieg	RSS Racing	Chevrolet	119	0	running	21
21	24	Matt Tifft (i)	JGL Racing	Toyota	119	0	running	0
22	4	Ross Chastain	JD Motorsports	Chevrolet	118	0	running	19
23	18	Bobby Labonte (i)	Joe Gibbs Racing	Toyota	118	0	running	0
24	78	B. J. McLeod (R)	B. J. McLeod Motorsports	Ford	118	0	running	17
25	43	Jeb Burton	Richard Petty Motorsports	Ford	118	0	running	16
26	46	Anthony Kumpen	Precision Performance Motorsports	Chevrolet	118	0	running	15
27	48	Brennan Poole (R)	Chip Ganassi Racing	Chevrolet	117	0	running	14
28	25	Chris Cockrum	Chris Cockrum Racing	Chevrolet	117	0	running	13
29	93	Scott Lagasse Jr.	RSS Racing	Chevrolet	117	0	running	12
30	0	Eric McClure	JD Motorsports	Chevrolet	117	0	running	11
31	20	Erik Jones (R)	Joe Gibbs Racing	Toyota	115	0	running	10
32	52	Joey Gase	Jimmy Means Racing	Chevrolet	114	0	running	9
33	07	Ray Black Jr. (R)	SS-Green Light Racing	Chevrolet	114	0	running	8
34	42	Kyle Larson (i)	Chip Ganassi Racing	Chevrolet	111	0	running	0
35	14	Benny Gordon	TriStar Motorsports	Toyota	103	0	transmission	6
36	89	Morgan Shepherd	Shepherd Racing Ventures	Chevrolet	59	0	rear gear	5
37	17	Jeff Green	Rick Ware Racing	Chevrolet	50	0	transmission	4
38	90	Martin Roy	King Autosport	Chevrolet	22	0	accident	3
39	85	Bobby Gerhart	Bobby Gerhart Racing	Chevrolet	6	0	accident	2
40	01	Ryan Preece (R)	JD Motorsports	Chevrolet	5	0	accident	1
Official race results

== Standings after the race ==
Drivers' Championship standings

Pos	Driver	Points
1	Elliott Sadler	38
2	Bubba Wallace	35 (-3)
3	Brandon Jones	34 (–4)
4	Daniel Suárez	33 (–5)
5	Blake Koch	32 (–6)
5	Brendan Gaughan	32 (-6)
7	Justin Allgaier	29 (-9)
7	Ty Dillon	29 (-9)
9	Dakoda Armstrong	27 (-11)
10	Jeremy Clements	26 (-12)
11	Ryan Reed	25 (-13)
12	David Starr	23 (-15)
Official driver's standings

- Note: Only the first 12 positions are included for the driver standings.

Previous race: 2015 Ford EcoBoost 300	NASCAR Xfinity Series; 2016 season	Next race: 2016 Heads Up Georgia 250
