= 2002 Aaron's 499 =

Race details
- Race 9 of 36 in the 2002 NASCAR Winston Cup Series season
- 2002 Aaron's 499 program cover, featuring Bobby Hamilton and a tribute to Davey Allison.
- Date: April 21, 2002
- Location: Talladega Superspeedway, Talladega, Alabama
- Course: Permanent racing facility
- Course length: 2.66 miles (4.28 km)
- Distance: 188 laps, 500.08 mi (804.8 km)
- Weather: Temperatures of 87.1 °F (30.6 °C); wind speeds up to 14 miles per hour (23 km/h)
- Average speed: 159.022 miles per hour (255.921 km/h)

Pole position
Driver	Jimmie Johnson	Hendrick Motorsports
- Time: 51.337

Most laps led
Driver	Dale Earnhardt Jr.	Dale Earnhardt, Inc.
- Laps: 133

Winner
No. 8	Dale Earnhardt Jr.	Dale Earnhardt, Inc.

Television in the United States
- Network: Fox Broadcasting Company
- Announcers: Mike Joy, Darrell Waltrip and Larry McReynolds

The 2002 Aaron's 499 was a NASCAR Winston Cup Series race that was held April 21, 2002, at Talladega Superspeedway in Talladega, Alabama. Dale Earnhardt Jr. of Dale Earnhardt, Inc. won the race, his first of the season and the second of his four straight wins at Talladega. His teammate Michael Waltrip finished second and Kurt Busch finished third.

== Entry list ==
#	Driver	Team	Make
1	Steve Park	Dale Earnhardt, Inc.	Chevrolet
2	Rusty Wallace	Penske Racing	Ford
4	Mike Skinner	Morgan–McClure Motorsports	Pontiac
5	Terry Labonte	Hendrick Motorsports	Chevrolet
6	Mark Martin	Roush Racing	Ford
7	Casey Atwood	Ultra-Evernham Motorsports	Dodge
8	Dale Earnhardt Jr.	Dale Earnhardt, Inc.	Chevrolet
9	Bill Elliott	Evernham Motorsports	Dodge
09	Geoff Bodine	Phoenix Racing	Ford
10	Johnny Benson Jr.	MB2 Motorsports	Pontiac
11	Brett Bodine	Brett Bodine Racing	Ford
12	Ryan Newman	Penske Racing	Ford
14	Stacy Compton	A.J. Foyt Racing	Pontiac
15	Michael Waltrip	Dale Earnhardt, Inc.	Chevrolet
17	Matt Kenseth	Roush Racing	Ford
18	Bobby Labonte	Joe Gibbs Racing	Pontiac
19	Jeremy Mayfield	Evernham Motorsports	Dodge
20	Tony Stewart	Joe Gibbs Racing	Pontiac
21	Elliott Sadler	Wood Brothers Racing	Ford
22	Ward Burton	Bill Davis Racing	Dodge
23	Hut Stricklin	Bill Davis Racing	Dodge
24	Jeff Gordon	Hendrick Motorsports	Chevrolet
25	Jerry Nadeau	Hendrick Motorsports	Chevrolet
26	Frank Kimmel	Haas-Carter Motorsports	Ford
28	Ricky Rudd	Robert Yates Racing	Ford
29	Kevin Harvick	Richard Childress Racing	Chevrolet
30	Jeff Green	Richard Childress Racing	Chevrolet
31	Robby Gordon	Richard Childress Racing	Chevrolet
32	Ricky Craven	PPI Motorsports	Ford
33	Mike Wallace	Andy Petree Racing	Chevrolet
36	Ken Schrader	MB2 Motorsports	Pontiac
40	Sterling Marlin	Chip Ganassi Racing	Dodge
41	Jimmy Spencer	Chip Ganassi Racing	Dodge
43	John Andretti	Petty Enterprises	Dodge
44	Steve Grissom	Petty Enterprises	Dodge
45	Kyle Petty	Petty Enterprises	Dodge
48	Jimmie Johnson	Hendrick Motorsports	Chevrolet
49	Shawna Robinson	BAM Racing	Dodge
55	Bobby Hamilton	Andy Petree Racing	Chevrolet
59	Bobby Gerhart	Gerhart Racing	Pontiac
77	Dave Blaney	Jasper Motorsports	Ford
88	Dale Jarrett	Robert Yates Racing	Ford
90	Rick Mast	Donlavey Racing	Ford
91	Dick Trickle	Evernham Motorsports	Dodge
97	Kurt Busch	Roush Racing	Ford
98	Kenny Wallace	Michael Waltrip Racing	Chevrolet
99	Jeff Burton	Roush Racing	Ford

== Qualifying ==
The drivers who failed to qualify were Rick Mast, Shawna Robinson, Bobby Gerhart, and Dick Trickle. Jimmie Johnson won the pole.

Pos.	#	Driver	Make	Team	Time	Avg. Speed
1	48	Jimmie Johnson	Chevrolet	Hendrick Motorsports	51.337	186.532
2	31	Robby Gordon	Chevrolet	Richard Childress Racing	51.370	186.409
3	15	Michael Waltrip	Chevrolet	Dale Earnhardt, Inc.	51.373	186.401
4	8	Dale Earnhardt Jr.	Chevrolet	Dale Earnhardt, Inc.	51.507	185.913
5	22	Ward Burton	Dodge	Bill Davis Racing	51.631	185.470
6	14	Stacy Compton	Pontiac	A.J. Foyt Racing	51.641	185.430
7	10	Johnny Benson Jr.	Pontiac	MB2 Motorsports	51.673	185.316
8	12	Ryan Newman	Ford	Penske Racing	51.679	185.298
9	1	Steve Park	Chevrolet	Dale Earnhardt, Inc.	51.723	185.140
10	24	Jeff Gordon	Chevrolet	Hendrick Motorsports	51.724	185.133
11	5	Terry Labonte	Chevrolet	Hendrick Motorsports	51.764	184.993
12	45	Kyle Petty	Dodge	Petty Enterprises	51.787	184.911
13	2	Rusty Wallace	Ford	Penske Racing	51.821	184.786
14	29	Kevin Harvick	Chevrolet	Richard Childress Racing	51.845	184.704
15	25	Jerry Nadeau	Chevrolet	Hendrick Motorsports	51.845	184.704
16	7	Casey Atwood	Dodge	Ultra-Evernham Motorsports	51.860	184.651
17	18	Bobby Labonte	Pontiac	Joe Gibbs Racing	51.865	184.633
18	33	Mike Wallace	Chevrolet	Andy Petree Racing	51.887	184.555
19	6	Mark Martin	Ford	Roush Racing	51.894	184.530
20	97	Kurt Busch	Ford	Roush Racing	51.894	184.530
21	77	Dave Blaney	Ford	Jasper Motorsports	51.894	184.530
22	23	Hut Stricklin	Dodge	Bill Davis Racing	51.896	184.523
23	09	Geoffrey Bodine	Ford	Phoenix Racing	51.902	184.502
24	11	Brett Bodine	Ford	Brett Bodine Racing	51.905	184.491
25	99	Jeff Burton	Ford	Roush Racing	51.970	184.260
26	20	Tony Stewart	Pontiac	Joe Gibbs Racing	51.981	184.221
27	98	Kenny Wallace	Chevrolet	Michael Waltrip Racing	52.006	184.133
28	43	John Andretti	Dodge	Petty Enterprises	52.013	184.108
29	26	Frank Kimmel	Ford	Haas-Carter Motorsports	52.056	183.956
30	30	Jeff Green	Chevrolet	Richard Childress Racing	52.074	183.892
31	19	Jeremy Mayfield	Dodge	Evernham Motorsports	52.095	183.818
32	41	Jimmy Spencer	Dodge	Chip Ganassi Racing	52.108	183.772
33	40	Sterling Marlin	Dodge	Chip Ganassi Racing	52.113	183.751
34	44	Steve Grissom	Dodge	Petty Enterprises	52.118	183.737
35	32	Ricky Craven	Ford	PPI Motorsports	52.139	183.663
36	36	Ken Schrader	Pontiac	MB2 Motorsports	52.165	183.571
Provisionals
37	17	Matt Kenseth	Ford	Roush Racing	52.339	182.961
38	28	Ricky Rudd	Ford	Robert Yates Racing	52.240	183.308
39	9	Bill Elliott	Dodge	Evernham Motorsports	52.215	183.396
40	21	Elliott Sadler	Ford	Wood Brothers Racing	52.530	182.296
41	88	Dale Jarrett	Ford	Robert Yates Racing	52.209	183.417
42	4	Mike Skinner	Chevrolet	Morgan–McClure Motorsports	0.000	0.000
43	55	Bobby Hamilton	Chevrolet	Andy Petree Racing	52.266	183.217
Failed to qualify
44	90	Rick Mast	Ford	Donlavey Racing	52.513	182.355
45	49	Shawna Robinson	Dodge	BAM Racing	52.469	182.508
46	59	Bobby Gerhart	Pontiac	Gerhart Racing	52.979	180.751
47	91	Dick Trickle	Dodge	Evernham Motorsports	52.706	181.687

== Race recap ==
From the green flag, Jimmie Johnson got off to a good start, leading the first eight laps. On lap 8, Dale Earnhardt Jr. passed Johnson and assumed the lead for all but two of the next 42 laps; Jeremy Mayfield led lap 33, and Michael Waltrip led lap 40. On lap 50, Sterling Marlin claimed the lead, and led two laps before Matt Kenseth passed him for the lead. Kenseth led until lap 56, when Earnhardt Jr. regained the lead. Earnhardt Jr. led until lap 65, when Mayfield assumed the lead, again for only a lap before losing the lead to Earnhardt. He continued to lead until lap 82 when Waltrip claimed it again. Waltrip led until lap 95, when Ryan Newman passed him and led lap 96. Earnhardt Jr. claimed the lead on the next lap and led until lap 105, for a cycle of green flag pit stops. During these pit stops, the lead cycled through Mark Martin, Jeff Burton and Kenseth before returning to Earnhardt Jr. on lap 114. On lap 116, the first caution came out for debris. Kenseth assumed the lead under caution, but Earnhardt Jr. got the lead back at the restart on lap 120. Over the next few laps, the lead would change between Martin, Kenseth, and Newman, before Earnhardt Jr. got a big lead on lap 131. He would lead the next 31 laps.

On lap 141, Newman got out of the race when his car had an engine failure, and was credited with a last place finish.

On lap 163, Dale Jarrett managed to take the lead away from Earnhardt Jr. For the next two laps, Earnhardt Jr. and Jarrett were racing almost side-by-side. A lap later, a very large crash on the back straightaway brought out the second caution. It started when Jimmie Johnson shuffled Kyle Petty out of line in turn 1. Coming on to the backstretch, Petty found a spot in line, but the whole field bunched up behind him, causing Mike Wallace to force Tony Stewart against the outside wall. A 24-car crash unfolded, one day after the largest recorded crash in NASCAR history (30 cars) occurred in exactly the same location in the Busch race. Collected alongside Wallace and Stewart were Steve Park, Rusty Wallace, Mike Skinner, Terry Labonte, Mark Martin, Casey Atwood, Bill Elliott, Johnny Benson, Matt Kenseth, Bobby Labonte, Jeremy Mayfield, Elliott Sadler, Kevin Harvick, Robby Gordon, Ricky Craven, Jimmy Spencer, John Andretti, Steve Grissom, Bobby Hamilton, Geoff Bodine, and Ricky Rudd. Sadler took the biggest hit in the wreck by slamming the corner of the inside wall on the right side, while Benson had to be pulled out of his car after it caught fire on pit road. However, all of the drivers involved escaped injury. It was the largest recorded Big One in Cup history until the following year's spring Talladega race.

Earnhardt Jr. assumed the lead from Jarrett after pit stops under caution and led the last 23 laps to win. With ten laps to go, oil leaked from Stewart's car and Martin's wounded car stalled. The race was temporarily red-flagged to clean the track. With four laps left, the green flag waved. Earnhardt Jr. led the four lap shootout, managing to hold off Waltrip and beat his teammate to the line by 0.100 seconds. Attendance figures were never recorded for this event. All of the drivers were born in the United States of America. This would primarily become the status quo of the Sprint Cup Series until the introduction of Juan Pablo Montoya at the 2006 Ford 400.

Ryan Newman's last-place finish was the only DNF due to a problem other than crash damage. Winnings for this race ranged from the winner's purse of $184,830 ($330,847.41 when adjusted for inflation) to the humble last-place winnings of $58,022 ($103,859.92 when adjusted for inflation). Compared to the previous day's Busch race crash, in which only three cars had finished on the lead lap, 21 cars finished on the lead lap in the Cup race.

== Race results ==
Fin	St	#	Driver	Make	Team	Laps	Led	Status	Pts	Winnings
1	4	8	Dale Earnhardt Jr.	Chevrolet	Dale Earnhardt, Inc.	188	133	running	185	$184830
2	3	15	Michael Waltrip	Chevrolet	Dale Earnhardt, Inc.	188	14	running	175	$131855
3	20	97	Kurt Busch	Ford	Roush Racing	188	0	running	165	$120255
4	10	24	Jeff Gordon	Chevrolet	Hendrick Motorsports	188	0	running	160	$143003
5	33	40	Sterling Marlin	Dodge	Chip Ganassi Racing	188	2	running	160	$127182
6	41	88	Dale Jarrett	Ford	Robert Yates Racing	188	2	running	155	$113530
7	1	48	Jimmie Johnson	Chevrolet	Hendrick Motorsports	188	8	running	151	$71780
8	13	2	Rusty Wallace	Ford	Penske Racing	188	0	running	142	$107480
9	25	99	Jeff Burton	Ford	Roush Racing	188	1	running	143	$106647
10	12	45	Kyle Petty	Dodge	Petty Enterprises	188	0	running	134	$65130
11	22	23	Hut Stricklin	Dodge	Bill Davis Racing	188	0	running	130	$63575
12	23	09	Geoffrey Bodine	Ford	Phoenix Racing	188	0	running	127	$59145
13	24	11	Brett Bodine	Ford	Brett Bodine Racing	188	0	running	124	$76865
14	38	28	Ricky Rudd	Ford	Robert Yates Racing	188	0	running	121	$101402
15	5	22	Ward Burton	Dodge	Bill Davis Racing	188	0	running	118	$102280
16	30	30	Jeff Green	Chevrolet	Richard Childress Racing	188	0	running	115	$56115
17	32	41	Jimmy Spencer	Dodge	Chip Ganassi Racing	188	0	running	112	$72600
18	35	32	Ricky Craven	Ford	PPI Motorsports	188	0	running	109	$67160
19	39	9	Bill Elliott	Dodge	Evernham Motorsports	188	0	running	106	$84826
20	11	5	Terry Labonte	Chevrolet	Hendrick Motorsports	188	0	running	103	$90143
21	27	98	Kenny Wallace	Chevrolet	Michael Waltrip Racing	188	0	running	100	$54570
22	43	55	Bobby Hamilton	Chevrolet	Andy Petree Racing	187	0	running	97	$76150
23	42	4	Mike Skinner	Chevrolet	Morgan–McClure Motorsports	187	0	running	94	$65729
24	36	36	Ken Schrader	Pontiac	MB2 Motorsports	186	0	running	91	$65010
25	34	44	Steve Grissom	Dodge	Petty Enterprises	186	0	running	88	$53605
26	16	7	Casey Atwood	Dodge	Ultra-Evernham Motorsports	186	0	running	85	$56525
27	6	14	Stacy Compton	Pontiac	A.J. Foyt Racing	184	0	running	82	$56270
28	14	29	Kevin Harvick	Chevrolet	Richard Childress Racing	181	0	running	79	$98498
29	26	20	Tony Stewart	Pontiac	Joe Gibbs Racing	180	0	crash	76	$100138
30	37	17	Matt Kenseth	Ford	Roush Racing	180	18	running	78	$80905
31	21	77	Dave Blaney	Ford	Jasper Motorsports	180	0	running	70	$63550
32	15	25	Jerry Nadeau	Chevrolet	Hendrick Motorsports	179	0	running	67	$63300
33	2	31	Robby Gordon	Chevrolet	Richard Childress Racing	176	0	running	64	$81631
34	9	1	Steve Park	Chevrolet	Dale Earnhardt, Inc.	174	0	running	61	$84710
35	29	26	Frank Kimmel	Ford	Haas-Carter Motorsports	172	0	running	58	$79892
36	31	19	Jeremy Mayfield	Dodge	Evernham Motorsports	167	2	crash	60	$62075
37	19	6	Mark Martin	Ford	Roush Racing	166	5	crash	57	$85258
38	28	43	John Andretti	Dodge	Petty Enterprises	164	0	crash	49	$78133
39	7	10	Johnny Benson Jr.	Pontiac	MB2 Motorsports	164	0	crash	46	$77615
40	40	21	Elliott Sadler	Ford	Wood Brothers Racing	163	0	crash	43	$58615
41	17	18	Bobby Labonte	Pontiac	Joe Gibbs Racing	163	0	crash	40	$96188
42	18	33	Mike Wallace	Chevrolet	Andy Petree Racing	162	0	crash	37	$50210
43	8	12	Ryan Newman	Ford	Penske Racing	141	3	engine	39	$58022

=== Race Facts ===
- Race Time: 3:08:41
- Average Speed: 159.022 miles per hour (255.921 km/h)
- Pole Speed: 186.532 miles per hour (300.194 km/h)
- Margin of Victory: 0.060 sec
- Cautions: 3 for 19 laps
- Lead changes: 26
- Percent of race run under caution: 10.1%
- Average green flag run: 42.2 laps

Previous race: 2002 Virginia 500	Winston Cup Series; 2002 season	Next race: 2002 NAPA Auto Parts 500
