= 2015 Subway Firecracker 250 =

Race details
- Map of Speedway
- Date: July 4, 2015
- Official name: 2015 Subway Firecracker 250
- Location: Daytona International Speedway in Daytona Beach, Florida
- Course: Tri-oval
- Course length: 2.5 miles (4.023 km)
- Distance: 104 laps, 260 mi (418.429 km)
- Scheduled distance: 100 laps, 250 mi (400 km)
- Weather: Cloudy
- Average speed: 132.804 mph (213.727 km/h)

Pole position
Driver	Daniel Suárez	Joe Gibbs Racing
- Time: 49.929

Most laps led
Driver	Brian Scott	Richard Childress Racing
- Laps: 84

Winner
No. 33	Austin Dillon	Richard Childress Racing

Television in the United States
- Network: NBCSN
- Announcers: Rick Allen, Jeff Burton, Steve Letarte

The 2015 Subway Firecracker 250 was a NASCAR Xfinity Series race held at Daytona International Speedway in Daytona Beach, Florida on July 4, 2015. The race was 14th iteration of the event and the 15th race of the 2015 NASCAR Xfinity Series. This would also be the first race since 2006 that NBC would telecast a NASCAR Xfinity Series race. Rookie Daniel Suárez won the pole while Brian Scott led the most laps. But it was Austin Dillon who would win the race in the end.

== Background ==
Daytona International Speedway is a race track in Daytona Beach, Florida, United States. Since opening in 1959, it has been the home of the Daytona 500, the most prestigious race in NASCAR as well as its season opening event. In addition to NASCAR, the track also hosts races for ARCA, AMA Superbike, IMSA, SCCA, and Motocross. The track features multiple layouts including the primary 2.500 mi (4.023 km) high-speed tri-oval, a 3.560 mi (5.729 km) sports car course, a 2.950 mi (4.748 km) motorcycle course, and a 1,320 ft (402.3 m) karting and motorcycle flat-track. The track's 180-acre (72.8 ha) infield includes the 29-acre (11.7 ha) Lake Lloyd, which has hosted powerboat racing. The speedway is operated by NASCAR pursuant to a lease with the City of Daytona Beach on the property that runs until 2054. Dale Earnhardt is Daytona International Speedway's all-time winningest driver, with a total of 34 career victories (12- Daytona 500 Qualifying Races) (7- NASCAR Xfinity Series Races) (6- Busch Clash Races) (6- IROC Races) (2- Pepsi 400 July Races) (1- The 1998 Daytona 500).

=== Entry list ===
- (R) denotes rookie driver
- (i) denotes driver who is ineligible for series driver points

#	Driver	Team	Make
0	Harrison Rhodes (R)	JD Motorsports	Chevrolet
01	Landon Cassill	JD Motorsports	Chevrolet
1	Elliott Sadler	Roush Fenway Racing	Ford
2	Brian Scott	Richard Childress Racing	Chevrolet
3	Ty Dillon	Richard Childress Racing	Chevrolet
4	Ross Chastain (R)	JD Motorsports	Chevrolet
6	Bubba Wallace (R)	Roush Fenway Racing	Ford
7	Regan Smith	JR Motorsports	Chevrolet
8	Blake Koch	TriStar Motorsports	Toyota
9	Chase Elliott	JR Motorsports	Chevrolet
13	Mark Thompson	MBM Motorsports	Dodge
14	Cale Conley (R)	TriStar Motorsports	Toyota
15	Scott Lagasse Jr.	NTS Motorsports	Chevrolet
16	Ryan Reed	Roush Fenway Racing	Ford
18	Daniel Suárez (R)	Joe Gibbs Racing	Toyota
19	Jeff Green	TriStar Motorsports	Toyota
20	David Ragan (i)	Joe Gibbs Racing	Toyota
22	Joey Logano (i)	Team Penske	Ford
24	Eric McClure	TriStar Motorsports	Toyota
25	John Wes Townley (i)	Athenian Motorsports	Chevrolet
26	Timmy Hill (i)	JGL Racing	Toyota
28	J. J. Yeley	JGL Racing	Toyota
33	Austin Dillon (i)	Richard Childress Racing	Chevrolet
37	Chris Cockrum	Chris Cockrum Racing	Chevrolet
39	Ryan Sieg	RSS Racing	Chevrolet
40	Derek White	MBM Motorsports	Dodge
42	Brennan Poole	HScott Motorsports with Chip Ganassi	Chevrolet
43	Dakoda Armstrong	Richard Petty Motorsports	Ford
44	David Starr	TriStar Motorsports	Toyota
51	Jeremy Clements	Jeremy Clements Racing	Chevrolet
52	Joey Gase	Jimmy Means Racing	Chevrolet
54	Erik Jones (i)	Joe Gibbs Racing	Toyota
60	Chris Buescher	Roush Fenway Racing	Ford
62	Brendan Gaughan	Richard Childress Racing	Chevrolet
66	Benny Gordon	PEG Racing	Toyota
70	Derrike Cope	Derrike Cope Racing	Chevrolet
74	Mike Harmon	Mike Harmon Racing	Dodge
85	Bobby Gerhart	Bobby Gerhart Racing	Chevrolet
88	Kasey Kahne (i)	JR Motorsports	Chevrolet
89	Morgan Shepherd	Shepherd Racing Ventures	Chevrolet
90	Martin Roy	King Autosport	Chevrolet
92	Dexter Bean	King Autosport	Chevrolet
97	Peyton Sellers (R)	Obaika Racing	Chevrolet
98	Aric Almirola (i)	Biagi-DenBeste Racing	Ford
Official Entry list

== Qualifying ==
Rookie Daniel Suárez won the pole for the race with his time being 49.929.

Pos	No.	Driver	Team	Manufacturer	R1	R2
1	18	Daniel Suárez (R)	Joe Gibbs Racing	Toyota	49.832	49.929
2	2	Brian Scott	Richard Childress Racing	Chevrolet	49.931	50.048
3	20	David Ragan (i)	Joe Gibbs Racing	Toyota	50.123	50.140
4	22	Joey Logano (i)	Team Penske	Ford	50.112	50.164
5	54	Erik Jones (i)	Joe Gibbs Racing	Toyota	50.058	50.193
6	3	Ty Dillon	Richard Childress Racing	Chevrolet	50.099	50.242
7	33	Austin Dillon (i)	Richard Childress Racing	Chevrolet	50.051	50.243
8	16	Ryan Reed	Roush Fenway Racing	Ford	50.192	50.351
9	62	Brendan Gaughan	Richard Childress Racing	Chevrolet	50.284	50.381
10	1	Elliott Sadler	Roush Fenway Racing	Ford	50.105	50.398
11	9	Chase Elliott	JR Motorsports	Chevrolet	50.216	50.446
12	15	Scott Lagasse Jr.	NTS Motorsports	Chevrolet	50.214	50.454
13	60	Chris Buescher	Roush Fenway Racing	Ford	50.286	—
14	6	Bubba Wallace (R)	Roush Fenway Racing	Ford	50.302	—
15	7	Regan Smith	JR Motorsports	Chevrolet	50.306	—
16	42	Brennan Poole	HScott Motorsports with Chip Ganassi	Chevrolet	50.395	—
17	43	Dakoda Armstrong	Richard Petty Motorsports	Ford	50.412	—
18	26	Timmy Hill (i)	JGL Racing	Toyota	50.497	—
19	98	Aric Almirola	Biagi-DenBeste Racing	Ford	50.541	—
20	66	Benny Gordon	PEG Racing	Toyota	50.599	—
21	88	Kasey Kahne (i)	JR Motorsports	Chevrolet	50.692	—
22	8	Blake Koch	TriStar Motorsports	Toyota	50.692	—
23	25	John Wes Townley (i)	Athenian Motorsports	Chevrolet	50.699	—
24	01	Landon Cassill	JD Motorsports	Chevrolet	50.712	—
25	44	David Starr	TriStar Motorsports	Toyota	50.767	—
26	85	Bobby Gerhart	Bobby Gerhart Racing	Chevrolet	50.799	—
27	92	Dexter Bean	King Autosport	Chevrolet	50.878	—
28	28	J. J. Yeley	JGL Racing	Toyota	50.888	—
29	89	Morgan Shepherd	Shepherd Racing Ventures	Chevrolet	51.007	—
30	90	Martin Roy	King Autosport	Chevrolet	51.038	—
31	74	Mike Harmon**	Mike Harmon Racing	Dodge	51.056	—
32	39	Ryan Sieg	RSS Racing	Chevrolet	51.135	—
33	70	Derrike Cope	Derrike Cope Racing	Chevrolet	51.148	—
34	4	Ross Chastain (R)*	JD Motorsports	Chevrolet	51.153	—
35	0	Harrison Rhodes (R)*	JD Motorsports	Chevrolet	51.208	—
36	51	Jeremy Clements*	Jeremy Clements Racing	Chevrolet	51.215	—
37	14	Cale Conley (R)*	TriStar Motorsports	Toyota	51.241	—
38	52	Joey Gase* **	Jimmy Means Racing	Chevrolet	51.401	—
39	24	Eric McClure*	TriStar Motorsports	Toyota	51.458	—
40	97	Peyton Sellers (R)*	Obaika Racing	Chevrolet	51.945	—
Failed to Qualify, withdrew, or driver changes
41	40	Derek White	MBM Motorsports	Dodge	51.286	—
42	19	Jeff Green	TriStar Motorsports	Toyota	51.320	—
43	37	Chris Cockrum	Chris Cockrum Racing	Chevrolet	51.446	—
44	13	Mark Thompson	MBM Motorsports	Dodge	51.120	—
Official Starting grid

* – Made the field via owners points

** – Mike Harmon and Joey Gase had to go to the rear of the field. Gase had Unapproved adjustments and Harmon missed the drivers intro.

== Race ==
The race was meant to start at around 7 pm Eastern but got delayed nearly two hours because of rain and started at nearly 9 pm Eastern instead. Outside pole sitter Brian Scott took the lead from pole sitter Daniel Suárez and Scott led the first lap of the race. The first caution did not take long as it flew on lap 3 when Bobby Gerhart spun off of turn 4 after he got turned by Joey Gase. The race would restart on lap 7. On the restart, Joey Logano took the lead from Scott but was immediately passed by Daniel Suárez and Suárez took the lead. On lap 9, the second caution would fly when rookie Cale Conley spun going into turn 3 after he got turned by Scott Lagasse Jr. The race would restart on lap 13. On the restart, Brian Scott took the lead from Suárez. On lap 15, the third caution would fly when Derrike Cope hit the outside wall in the tri-oval after he came across the nose of Austin Dillon. During the caution as the cars made their way to pit road, Jeremy Clements decided to come to pit road at almost the very last minute but Landon Cassill decided not to pit at the very last minute and the two made contact near the entrance and turned Cassill around in the process and gave both cars damage. The race would restart on lap 20. Eventually, the race would finally get its first green flag run of over 5 laps and went green for the next 62 laps. Eventually, green flag pitstops would begin on lap 56. Brian Scott pitted on that lap and gave the lead to Joey Logano. Logano pitted on lap 59 and gave the lead back to Scott after everything cycled through. On lap 59, a weird incident occurred when Scott Lagasse Jr's hood all of a sudden blew up and had to retire from the race.

=== Final laps ===
With 20 laps to go on lap 81, the 4th caution would fly when Cale Conley spun in turns 3 and 4. The race would restart with 15 laps to go with Scott leading. Scott was looking for his first ever Xfinity Series win of his career in his 190th start. But with 10 laps to go, the 5th caution would fly for the first big one of the race that occurred going into turn 1. It started when Ryan Reed got sideways by Ty Dillon and Reed turned down into Brendan Gaughan and Gaughan turned down into Bubba Wallace which caused Wallace to spin up right in front of the pack and take out more cars with him. A scary moment in the wreck also occurred when Brennan Poole went down to avoid a spinning Aric Almirola and Poole ended up sliding on the wet pavement and shot across the track and hit the outside wall head on in turn 1. Poole and everyone else were okay. The wreck collected a total of 14 cars. The wreck collected Bubba Wallace, Brennan Poole, Aric Almirola, Chris Buescher, Blake Koch, Ryan Reed, John Wes Townley, Brendan Gaughan, Daniel Suárez, Ty Dillon, Regan Smith, Joey Gase, Kasey Kahne, and Martin Roy. The race was red flagged for a short bit to clean up the mess. The race would restart with 5 laps to go. With 4 to go, Elliott Sadler went to take the lead from Brian Scott down the backstretch. Scott went up to block but cut across Sadler's nose and hit the outside wall and would cause the 2nd big one bringing out the 6th caution of the race and took out 15 cars. Joey Logano went down to avoid Scott but got turned by David Starr which caused the wreck. The cars involved were Brian Scott, Joey Logano, Harrison Rhodes, David Ragan, Ryan Sieg, David Starr, Dakoda Armstrong, Regan Smith, Erik Jones, Elliott Sadler, Chase Elliott, Joey Gase, Ross Chastain, Benny Gordon, and Martin Roy. The wreck would set up three attempts of a green-white-checkered finish with Austin Dillon as the new leader. On the restart, Dillon would take the lead from Dakoda Armstrong. On the final lap, the 7th and final caution would fly when Daniel Suárez spun down the frontstretch towards the tri-oval and it meant Austin Dillon would win. The race would be Dillon's first win of his Xfinity Series career at Daytona. Elliott Sadler, Chase Elliott, Kasey Kahne, and Benny Gordon rounded out the top 5 while Dakoda Armstrong, David Ragan, Erik Jones, Harrison Rhodes, and Ross Chastain rounded out the top 10. This would be Benny Gordon's first and only top 5 finish of his Xfinity Series career. This would be Harrison Rhodes' first top 10 of his Xfinity Series career.

== Race results ==
Pos	Car	Driver	Team	Manufacturer	Laps Run	Laps Led	Status	Points
1	33	Austin Dillon (i)	Richard Childress Racing	Chevrolet	104	9	running	0
2	1	Elliott Sadler	Roush Fenway Racing	Ford	104	0	running	42
3	9	Chase Elliott	JR Motorsports	Chevrolet	104	0	running	41
4	88	Kasey Kahne (i)	JR Motorsports	Chevrolet	104	0	running	0
5	66	Benny Gordon	PED Racing	Toyota	104	0	running	39
6	43	Dakoda Armstrong	Richard Petty Motorsports	Ford	104	0	running	38
7	20	David Ragan (i)	Joe Gibbs Racing	Toyota	104	0	running	0
8	54	Erik Jones (i)	Joe Gibbs Racing	Toyota	104	0	running	0
9	0	Harrison Rhodes (R)	JD Motorsports	Chevrolet	104	0	running	35
10	4	Ross Chastain (R)	JD Motorsports	Chevrolet	103	1	running	35
11	26	Timmy Hill (i)	JGL Racing	Toyota	103	0	running	0
12	60	Chris Buescher	Roush Fenway Racing	Ford	103	0	running	32
13	16	Ryan Reed	Roush Fenway Racing	Ford	103	0	running	31
14	22	Joey Logano (i)	Team Penske	Ford	103	4	running	0
15	18	Daniel Suárez (R)	Joe Gibbs Racing	Toyota	103	6	running	30
16	97	Peyton Sellers (R)	Obaika Racing	Chevrolet	102	0	running	28
17	7	Regan Smith	JR Motorsports	Chevrolet	102	0	running	27
18	8	Blake Koch	TriStar Motorsports	Toyota	102	0	running	26
19	25	John Wes Townley (i)	Athenian Motorsports	Chevrolet	101	0	running	0
20	28	J. J. Yeley	JGL Racing	Toyota	101	0	running	24
21	90	Martin Roy	King Autosport	Chevrolet	101	0	running	23
22	85	Bobby Gerhart	Bobby Gerhart Racing	Chevrolet	101	0	running	22
23	2	Brian Scott	Richard Childress Racing	Chevrolet	101	84	running	23
24	24	Eric McClure	TriStar Motorsports	Toyota	100	0	running	20
25	62	Brendan Gaughan	Richard Childress Racing	Chevrolet	100	0	running	19
26	3	Ty Dillon	Richard Childress Racing	Chevrolet	100	0	running	18
27	39	Ryan Sieg	RSS Racing	Chevrolet	97	0	crash	17
28	51	Jeremy Clements	Jeremy Clements Racing	Chevrolet	97	0	running	16
29	44	David Starr	TriStar Motorsports	Toyota	96	0	crash	15
30	52	Joey Gase	Jimmy Means Racing	Chevrolet	95	0	crash	14
31	01	Landon Cassill	JD Motorsports	Chevrolet	95	0	running	13
32	14	Cale Conley (R)	TriStar Motorsports	Toyota	95	0	running	12
33	74	Mike Harmon	Mike Harmon Racing	Dodge	95	0	running	11
34	6	Bubba Wallace (R)	Roush Fenway Racing	Ford	90	0	crash	10
35	98	Aric Almirola (i)	Biagi-DenBeste Racing	Ford	90	0	crash	0
36	42	Brennan Poole	HScott Motorsports with Chip Ganassi	Chevrolet	90	0	crash	8
37	15	Scott Lagasse Jr.	NTS Motorsports	Chevrolet	58	0	crash	7
38	70	Derrike Cope	Derrike Cope Racing	Chevrolet	15	0	crash	6
39	89	Morgan Shepherd	Shepherd Racing Ventures	Chevrolet	10	0	overheating	5
40	92	Dexter Bean	King Autosport	Chevrolet	6	0	vibration	4
Official Race results

Previous race: 2015 Owens Corning AttiCat 300	NASCAR Xfinity Series; 2015 season	Next race: 2015 Kentucky 300
