= 2002 Daytona 500 =

44th iteration of the Daytona 500

Race details
- Race 1 of 36 in the 2002 NASCAR Winston Cup Series
- 2002 Daytona 500 logo
- Date: February 17, 2002
- Location: Daytona International Speedway, Daytona Beach, Florida
- Course: Permanent racing facility 2.5 mi (4.02336 km)
- Distance: 200 laps, 500 mi (804.672 km)
- Weather: Temperatures reaching up to 70 °F (21 °C); wind speeds approaching 12 miles per hour (19 km/h)
- Average speed: 130.810 miles per hour (210.518 km/h)

Pole position
Driver	Jimmie Johnson	Hendrick Motorsports
- Time: 48,431

Qualifying race winners
Duel 1 Winner	Jeff Gordon	Hendrick Motorsports
Duel 2 Winner	Michael Waltrip	Dale Earnhardt, Inc.

Most laps led
Driver	Sterling Marlin	Chip Ganassi Racing
- Laps: 78

Winner
No. 22	Ward Burton	Bill Davis Racing

Television in the United States
- Network: NBC
- Announcers: Allen Bestwick, Benny Parsons, Wally Dallenbach Jr.
- Nielsen ratings: 10.9/26 (18.8 million viewers)

The 2002 Daytona 500, the 44th running of the event, was held on February 17 at Daytona International Speedway in Daytona Beach, Florida as the first of 36 races of the 2002 NASCAR Winston Cup Series. Rookie Jimmie Johnson, driving the No. 48 Chevrolet for Hendrick Motorsports, won the pole with fellow Daytona 500 rookie Kevin Harvick qualifying second, making this the first time the field would be led by two first-time Daytona 500 participants. Ward Burton, driving the No.22 Dodge for Bill Davis Racing, won the race. This race was the last for long-time veteran driver Dave Marcis.

As part of the television contract signed at the end of the 1999 NASCAR season, the 2002 Daytona 500 was televised by NBC. Allen Bestwick provided the play-by-play in the booth with color commentators Benny Parsons and Wally Dallenbach Jr. The prerace show was hosted by Bill Weber, who reported from the pits with Matt Yocum, Marty Snider, and Dave Burns. This was the first time NBC televised the Daytona 500.

== Background ==
Daytona International Speedway in 2015

The 2002 Daytona 500 was the first of 36 scheduled stock car races of the 2002 NASCAR Winston Cup Series, and the 44th running of the event. It was held on February 17, 2002, in Daytona Beach, Florida, at Daytona International Speedway, one of six superspeedways to hold NASCAR races; the others are Michigan International Speedway, Auto Club Speedway, Indianapolis Motor Speedway, Pocono Raceway, and Talladega Superspeedway. Its standard track is a four-turn, 2.5-mile (4.0 km) superspeedway. Daytona's turns are banked at 31 degrees, and the front stretch—the location of the finish line—is banked at 18 degrees.

The Daytona 500 was conceived by NASCAR founder Bill France Sr., who built the Daytona International Speedway. The race was first held in 1959; it is the successor to shorter races held on beaches around Daytona Beach. It has been the opening round of the NASCAR season since 1982, and from 1988, it has been one of four events that require cars to run restrictor plates. The Daytona 500 is often regarded as NASCAR's most prestigious race because it offers the most prize money in American auto racing. Victory is considered equal to winning either the World Series, the Super Bowl or The Masters. The race is often called the "Great American Race" or the "Super Bowl of Stock Car Racing".

In preparation for the race, NASCAR scheduled several test sessions on January 7–9 (for teams who finished in an odd-number position in the 2002 car owner points standings) and January 14–16, 2002 (for teams who finished in an even-number position in the 2002 car owner points standings). (Note: Kenny Bräck, the 1999 Indianapolis 500 winner, tested for Chip Ganassi Racing for the final three days of testing.) Every test session began at 9 a.m. EST, stopped at 12:00 – 1:00 p.m. EST, and concluded at 5:00 p.m. EST. On January 7, Stacy Compton was fastest in the first session with a speed of 183.087 mph (294.650 km/h) and a speed of 183.120 mph (294.703 km/h) by Jimmie Johnson paced the second session. Johnson led the third and fourth sessions on January 8 with respective speeds of 183.109 mph (294.685 km/h) and 183.816 mph (295.823 km/h). On January 9, Johnson and Ward Burton led sessions five and six, respectively, with speeds of 183.415 mph (295.178 km/h) and 184.961 mph (297.666 km/h) respectively. The January 14 test sessions were cancelled due to rain; NASCAR officials elongated testing to January 17. On January 15 and 16, Jerry Nadeau, Michael Waltrip and Jeremy Mayfield paced sessions seven, eight and nine with speeds of 182.905 mph (294.357 km/h), 183.102 mph (294.674 km/h) and 183.221 mph (294.866 km/h) respectively. The final sessions on January 17 were paced by Waltrip and Mike Wallace with respective speeds of 183.255 mph (294.920 km/h) and 184.302 mph (296.605 km/h).

=== Pre-race regulation changes ===
For the race, NASCAR mandated a series of rules regarding the aerodynamics of the cars. Restrictor plates had to have an opening of 7/8 in (22 mm) in every car, and their air dams were extended to 1.5 in (38 mm) forward on the front bumpers. The rear spoilers on the Dodge, Pontiac and Ford vehicles were required to be 6.5 in (170 mm), 55 in (1,400 mm) wide and angled at 55 degrees. All Chevrolet cars had their spoilers shortened by 1/4 in (6.4 mm).

After the Ford teams reported an aerodynamic deficiency to the remainder of the field during testing, NASCAR allowed them to lower the height of their spoilers by 1/4 in (6.4 mm) to 6.25 in (159 mm) and 57 in (1,400 mm) wide. This change created further complications for Ford when the manufacturer had to raise the rear deck lid on its vehicle by 1/2 in (13 mm) to 3/4 in (19 mm) in order to comply with the minimum height for its rear spoiler. Later, NASCAR installed an additional template on each of the four types of vehicle in an attempt to ensure the spoiler is positioned correctly.

In other changes, NASCAR permitted teams to switch engines between the qualifying session and the race in an exception to its cost-cutting regulation mandating each team to use one engine per race weekend because of the Daytona 500 race format having two qualifying races to determine the majority of its starting order.

== Practice and qualifying ==
Eight practice sessions were scheduled before the Sunday race. The first two were held on February 8 and lasted 120 and 110 minutes each. The next two on February 11 and 12 were shortened to 105 minutes. On February 13, two 45 minute practice sessions were scheduled. A session lasting 60 minutes was held the following day. The final practice session, scheduled for February 16, was cancelled because of rain. In the first practice session, Johnson was fastest with a lap of 48.639 seconds, ahead of his Hendrick Motorsports teammates Jeff Gordon and Jerry Nadeau in second and third. Ricky Rudd, Ward Burton, Dale Jarrett, Robert Pressley, Mike Wallace, Bill Elliott, and Kevin Harvick made up positions four to ten. Johnson led the second practice session later that day with a 48.685 seconds time. Rudd, Gordon, Ward Burton, Nadeau, Terry Labonte, Jarrett, Dale Earnhardt Jr., Johnny Benson Jr. and Waltrip rounded out the top ten drivers.

54 cars entered first-round qualifying on February 9; due to NASCAR's qualifying procedure only 43 could race. Unlike most races during the season, the qualifying session determined the first two position, while the rest of the field qualified by the 2002 Gatorade 125s. Each driver was limited to two timed laps, with the starting order determined by the competitor's fastest times. Johnson was the fourth driver to venture onto the track; he took the maiden pole position of his career, and his first in a NASCAR-sanctioned event since he debuted in the series at the 1998 Busch Series, with a time of 48.431 seconds. He became the third rookie driver in history to claim pole position for the Daytona 500 after Loy Allen Jr. in the 1994 event and Skinner in the 1997 race. Johnson was joined on the grid's front row by Harvick who was sixteen-thousands of a second slower, after a driver error in the third and fourth turns on his second lap. This meant for the first time in history, the Daytona 500 featured two rookie drivers starting in the first two grid positions. After qualifying, Johnson said, "We've shown our hand during testing and practice. We didn't want to fool ourselves into thinking we had a magic three- or four-tenths hidden somewhere. We thought that some other guys had an ace in their back pockets, and we didn't expect Kevin Harvick to jump up there."

After the qualifying session, NASCAR vice-president of communications Jim Hunter stated no regulation changes would be considered until after the qualifying races. Notwithstanding this statement, NASCAR announced from the third practice session onward, teams entering Ford cars would be permitted to lower the height of their spoiler by a further 1/4 in (6.4 mm) to 6 in (150 mm) tall in an attempt to decrease aerodynamic drag produced, and in response to the manufacturer getting two of its cars in the first 20 positions in qualifying, and its sub-par results in the 2002 Budweiser Shootout.

In the third practice session, Geoff Bodine went fastest with a lap of 47.776 seconds, ahead of Dave Blaney in second and Rudd third. Sterling Marlin was fourth-fastest, with Jeff Burton fifth and Dave Marcis sixth. Harvick, Greg Biffle, Ken Schrader, and Bobby Hamilton followed in the top ten. Second round qualifying was held during the afternoon on February 11 to allow drivers to improve their fastest times or set a lap in the event they were not able to in first round qualifying; the session's fastest driver, placing 27th-fastest was Kyle Petty, qualifying fastest of the four competitors who were in the session. Skinner, Norm Benning, and Kirk Shelmerdine were the three other drivers who competed in the session.

Mark Martin led the fourth practice session with a time of 47.933 seconds, with Johnson, Rusty Wallace, Benson, Jeff Burton, Jarrett, Elliott Sadler, John Andretti, Nadeau and Biffle in positions two to ten. With ten minutes of the session remaining, Brett Bodine experienced understeer exiting the second corner, causing him to slow in a plethora of cars, and drift up the circuit. Hamilton, who was close by Bodine, made contact with the latter's left-rear quarter panel, turning Hamilton into Todd Bodine. That caused a chain reaction accident involving Tony Stewart, Jeff Burton, Jimmy Spencer, and Rudd. Hamilton, Jeff Burton and Todd Bodine ventured to the infield medical center, and were released after precautionary check-ups. Hamilton and Todd Bodine switched to back-up cars for the Gatorade 125s. Casey Atwood topped the fifth practice session with a 47.342 seconds lap. Elliott Sadler, Hermie Sadler, Marlin, Kenny Wallace, Shawna Robinson, Robby Gordon, Spencer, Mayfield, and Todd Bodine placed in second to tenth positions. A lap of 47.721 seconds gave Elliott the lead in the sixth session; Compton, Benson, Blaney, Andretti, Matt Kenseth, Hamilton, Brett Bodine, Waltrip and Sadler rounded out the session's top ten drivers.

Gordon and Waltrip were the winners of the Gatorade 125s. The qualifying grid was finalized with Gordon third and Waltrip fourth. Earnhardt qualified fifth, ahead of Stewart, Schrader, Nadeau, Rudd, and Bobby Labonte. By qualifying for the race, Marcis broke Richard Petty's all-time record of 32 Daytona 500 starts with his 33rd, as Robinson became the second woman to progress to the race, and the first since Janet Guthrie at the 1980 edition. The eleven drivers who failed to qualify were Spencer, Hut Stricklin, Buckshot Jones, Biffle, Rick Mast, Bobby Gerhart, Hermie Sadler, Carl Long, Benning, Shelmerdine, and Dwayne Leik. In the final practice session, Harvick was fastest with a lap of 47.588 seconds; Sadler and Terry Labonte were second and third. Kurt Busch, Rudd, Andretti, Ricky Craven, Brett Bodine, Robby Gordon and Rusty Wallace followed in positions four to ten. Craven's engine failed as he was drafting Jarrett, prompting the latter to steer right to avoid a collision, and causing a four-car accident involving Petty, Terry Labonte, Marcis, and Brett Bodine on the backstretch.

After the final practice session, and before the race, NASCAR allowed teams who entered Ford and Dodge cars to lower the rear spoilers by a further 1/4 in (6.4 mm) so that it was 5.75 in (146 mm) tall for Ford entries and 6.25 in (159 mm) on the Dodge vehicles in the series' attempt to continue to seek to create parity within the field.

== Race summary ==
The drama started almost immediately as one of the pre-race favourites, shootout winner Tony Stewart, blew an engine on just the third lap. The race's first caution flew as another favourite, Dale Earnhardt Jr., ran over debris and cut a front right tire in turn 1 on lap 23 while running in second-place. He then staged a furious charge back into top 10 with a new nose after the tire tore up the right-front fender. Dave Marcis' final Winston Cup start was brought to an end on lap 79 due to engine trouble, bringing out the second caution of the day. Just before halfway, Earnhardt Jr. got into more trouble when he this time lost a rear tire in turn 4, then ended up driving through the infield grass as he tried to get onto pit road as the flailing rubber had damaged a brake line. This brought out a third caution. On the following restart, Brett Bodine spun off of Kenny Wallace's bumper, and the yellow flag came back out for the fourth time.

On lap 138, rookie Shawna Robinson and Mike Skinner tangled exiting turn 2, bringing out the fifth caution of the day. But the course of the race took a twist on lap 148 when contact between Jeff Gordon and Kevin Harvick triggered the "Big One". The pair were battling for second place, when Harvick attempted to block Gordon on the approach to turn 1, but it came too late and the 29 car first jinked left down onto the apron, before spinning back across the track and collecting a number of cars. A total of 18 cars were caught up in the wreck, the same number of cars collected in the 2001 Daytona 500's Big One. These included Matt Kenseth, Ricky Rudd, Joe Nemechek, Ken Schrader, Jeremy Mayfield, John Andretti, Bobby Hamilton, Jerry Nadeau and Earnhardt Jr. (his third incident of the race) amongst others.

Polesitter Jimmie Johnson's chances of victory were dashed on lap 173 when he blew a tire exiting the tri-oval towards turn 1. His car bounced off Jeff Green, spun through the infield grass and slid back across the track in a similar manner to Harvick's, although luckily this time there were no cars behind him when the car rejoined the track. Although he kept the car off the wall, he was forced to pit for repairs and would eventually finish a lap down in 15th. The eighth caution of the day flew when Robby Gordon was spun coming off turn 2, setting up what appeared to be a 6-lap showdown to the finish, with defending cup champion and two-time 500 winner Jeff Gordon leading fellow two-time winner Sterling Marlin.

As the field came down to the green, chaos ensued. A chain reaction began between the eighth and ninth positions after one driver missed a gear. Five cars were involved, including the defending Daytona 500 winner Michael Waltrip, who spun towards the pits and nearly hit the pace car being driven by Jay Leno. Up front, Marlin got a run on Gordon exiting the tri-oval, and managed to get his nose underneath the 24 car. Gordon threw a late block and spun across the nose of the Dodge, in almost a carbon copy of the incident between him and Harvick. Despite smoke caused by a damaged front right fender, Marlin beat Ward Burton back to the caution flag and maintained the lead, while Gordon rejoined at the tail of the lead lap. Rather than have the race finish under caution, the officials stopped the field on the backstretch so the track could be cleared by course officials and the drivers could race to the finish.

Concerned about damage on his right front fender, Marlin got out of his car and tried to pull the fender away from the tire while the cars were stopped, and was told to stop by pace car driver Buster Auton. NASCAR deemed Marlin to be in breach of the rule forbidding any repair work during a red flag. When the cars restarted and pulled away under yellow, NASCAR penalized Marlin by sending him to the rear of the field.

Burton inherited the lead for the 3-lap shootout, followed by fellow Virginia native Elliott Sadler and 1986 race winner Geoff Bodine. These three would remain pretty much single file to the finish, while a further eleven cars set about a frantic scrap from fourth on back. 3-time 500 winner Dale Jarrett collided with Mark Martin upon taking the white flag and became yet another car to be sent spinning through the grass entering turn 1. Burton held off Sadler to claim the win, with Bodine finishing third just two years after a crash that nearly took his life in the Craftsman Truck Series' Daytona 250 at the same racetrack. Kurt Busch prevailed in the mad scrap for fourth, followed by Waltrip, Martin, top rookie Ryan Newman, the recovering cars of Marlin and Gordon, and Johnny Benson Jr.

Burton's Daytona 500 win was the first for Dodge since Richard Petty's win in the 1974 race. This was Phoenix Racing's best finish until Brad Keselowski won the 2009 Aaron's 499 at Talladega. As of 2017, this has been the only Daytona 500 to feature more than one trio of brothers. All three Bodine brothers (Geoff, Brett, and Todd) had started the Daytona 500 together, as had all three Wallace brothers (Rusty, Mike, and Kenny), but never all three brothers from both families in the same year.

== Results ==
Pos	Grid	Car No.	Driver	Team	Manufacturer	Laps	Laps Led	Status
1	19	22	Ward Burton	Bill Davis Racing	Dodge	200	5	Running
2	41	21	Elliott Sadler	Wood Brothers Racing	Ford	200	0	Running
3	35	09	Geoff Bodine (W)	Phoenix Racing	Ford	200	0	Running
4	15	97	Kurt Busch	Roush Racing	Ford	200	16	Running
5	4	15	Michael Waltrip (W)	Dale Earnhardt, Inc.	Chevrolet	200	20	Running
6	39	6	Mark Martin	Roush Racing	Ford	200	0	Running
7	23	12	Ryan Newman (R)	Penske Racing	Ford	200	0	Running
8	13	40	Sterling Marlin (W)	Chip Ganassi Racing	Dodge	200	78	Running
9	3	24	Jeff Gordon (W)	Hendrick Motorsports	Chevrolet	200	29	Running
10	38	10	Johnny Benson Jr.	MBV Motorsports	Pontiac	200	0	Running
11	29	9	Bill Elliott (W)	Evernham Motorsports	Dodge	200	0	Running
12	33	99	Jeff Burton	Roush Racing	Ford	200	2	Running
13	12	31	Robby Gordon	Richard Childress Racing	Chevrolet	200	0	Running
14	21	88	Dale Jarrett (W)	Robert Yates Racing	Ford	200	0	Running
15	1	48	Jimmie Johnson (R)	Hendrick Motorsports	Chevrolet	199	0	Flagged
16	27	11	Brett Bodine	Brett Bodine Racing	Ford	199	0	Flagged
17	43	32	Ricky Craven	PPI Motorsports	Ford	199	0	Flagged
18	37	2	Rusty Wallace	Penske Racing	Ford	198	0	Flagged
19	30	30	Jeff Green (R)	Richard Childress Racing	Chevrolet	197	0	Flagged
20	11	5	Terry Labonte	Hendrick Motorsports	Chevrolet	194	0	Accident
21	17	33	Mike Wallace	Andy Petree Racing	Chevrolet	193	0	Flagged
22	31	92	Robert Pressley	Melling Racing	Dodge	190	0	Engine
23	20	4	Mike Skinner	Morgan-McClure Motorsports	Chevrolet	190	0	Flagged
24	36	49	Shawna Robinson (R)	BAM Racing	Dodge	187	0	Flagged
25	42	77	Dave Blaney	Jasper Motorsports	Ford	186	0	Flagged
26	7	36	Ken Schrader	MBV Motorsports	Pontiac	179	46	Flagged
27	24	14	Stacy Compton	A.J. Foyt Racing	Pontiac	178	0	Flagged
28	8	25	Jerry Nadeau	Hendrick Motorsports	Chevrolet	174	3	Accident
29	5	8	Dale Earnhardt Jr.	Dale Earnhardt, Inc.	Chevrolet	171	0	Flagged
30	18	1	Kenny Wallace	Dale Earnhardt, Inc.	Chevrolet	171	0	Flagged
31	22	66	Todd Bodine	Haas-Carter Motorsports	Ford	158	0	Flagged
32	32	55	Bobby Hamilton	Andy Petree Racing	Chevrolet	156	0	Flagged
33	40	17	Matt Kenseth	Roush Racing	Ford	154	4	Accident
34	10	18	Bobby Labonte	Joe Gibbs Racing	Pontiac	153	3	Overheating
35	26	7	Casey Atwood	Ultra-Evernham Motorsports	Dodge	153	0	Accident
36	2	29	Kevin Harvick	Richard Childress Racing	Chevrolet	148	3	Accident
37	16	43	John Andretti	Petty Enterprises	Dodge	148	1	Accident
38	9	28	Ricky Rudd	Robert Yates Racing	Ford	148	0	Accident
39	28	19	Jeremy Mayfield	Evernham Motorsports	Dodge	148	0	Accident
40	25	26	Joe Nemechek	Haas-Carter Motorsports	Ford	148	0	Accident
41	34	45	Kyle Petty	Petty Enterprises	Dodge	146	0	Engine
42	14	71	Dave Marcis	Marcis Auto Racing	Chevrolet	79	0	Engine
43	6	20	Tony Stewart	Joe Gibbs Racing	Pontiac	2	0	Engine
Failed to Qualify
		41	Jimmy Spencer	Chip Ganassi Racing	Dodge			
		23	Hut Stricklin	Bill Davis Racing	Dodge			
		44	Buckshot Jones	Petty Enterprises	Dodge			
		16	Greg Biffle (R)	Roush Racing	Ford			
		90	Rick Mast	Donlavey Racing	Ford			
		59	Bobby Gerhart (R)	Gerhart Racing	Pontiac			
		02	Hermie Sadler (R)	SCORE Motorsports	Chevrolet			
		85	Carl Long (R)	Mansion Motorsports	Dodge			
		84	Norm Benning (R)	Norm Benning Racing	Chevrolet			
		80	Kirk Shelmerdine (R)	Hover Motorsports	Ford			
		72	Dwayne Leik (R)	Marcis Auto Racing	Chevrolet			

== Notes and references ==
=== References ===
Previous race: 2001 New Hampshire 300	Winston Cup Series; 2002 season	Next race: 2002 Subway 400
