= Bobby Gerhart =

American racing driver (born 1958)

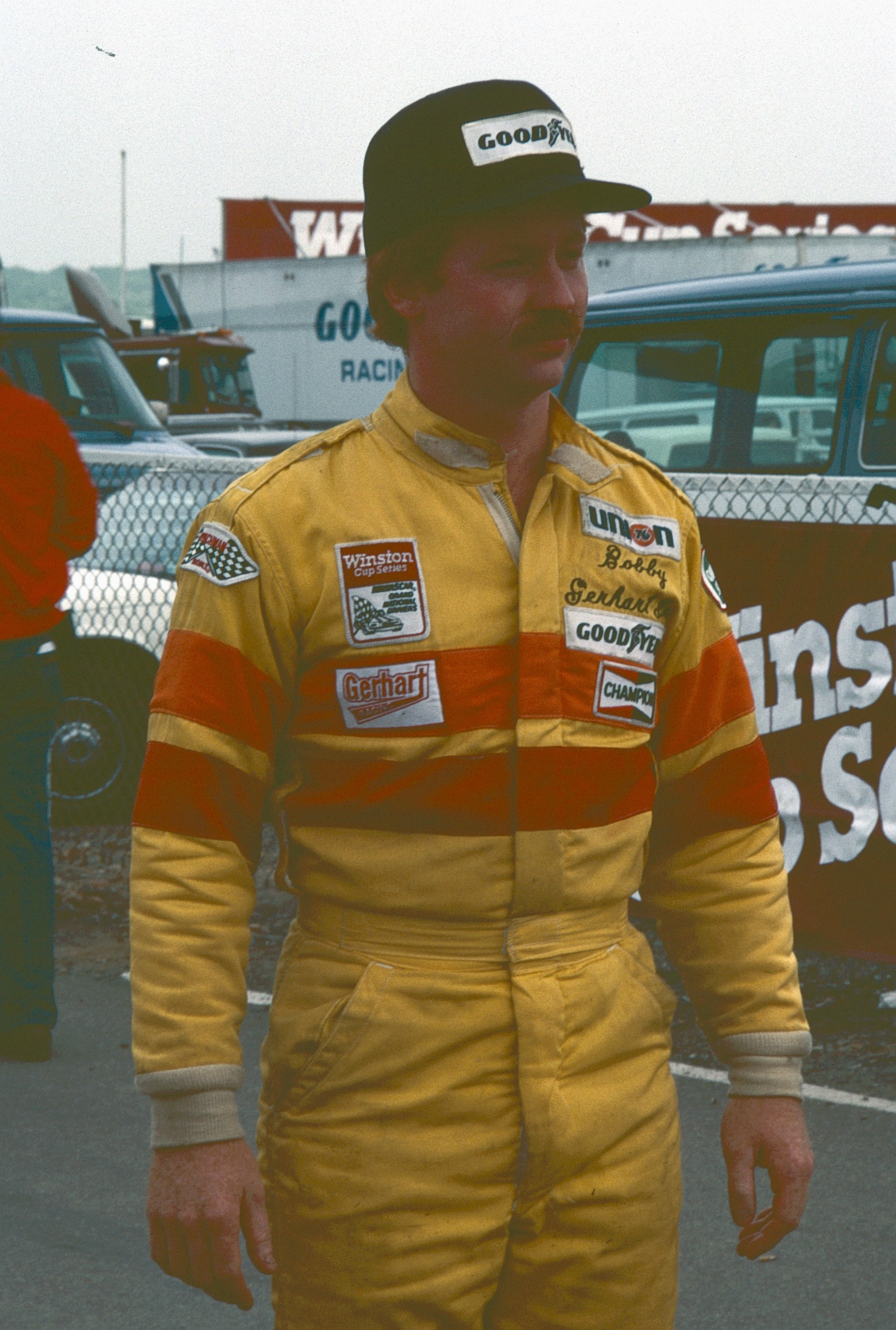
- Gerhart in the 1980s
- Born: Robert Gerhart Jr. July 21, 1958 (age 68) Lebanon, Pennsylvania, U.S.

ARCA Menards Series career
- Debut season: 1988
- Current team: Gerhart Racing
- Car number: 5
- Starts: 341
- Wins: 9
- Poles: 9
- Best finish: 2nd in 2006

Awards
- 1988: ARCA Permatex Super Car Series Rookie of the Year

NASCAR Cup Series career
- 24 races run over 9 years
- 1992 position: 57th
- Best finish: 44th (1985)
- First race: 1983 Van Scoy Diamond Mine 500 (Pocono)
- Last race: 1992 DieHard 500 (Talladega)
Wins	Top tens	Poles
0	0	0

NASCAR O'Reilly Auto Parts Series career
- 18 races run over 7 years
- 2016 position: 60th
- Best finish: 60th (2016)
- First race: 2001 Jani-King 300 (Texas)
- Last race: 2016 Subway Firecracker 250 (Daytona)
Wins	Top tens	Poles
0	0	0

NASCAR FedEx Freight Truck Series career
- 10 races run over 6 years
- 2019 position: 64th
- Best finish: 45th (2017)
- First race: 1996 Stevens Beil/Genuine Parts 200 (Flemington)
- Last race: 2019 NextEra Energy 250 (Daytona)
Wins	Top tens	Poles
0	0	0
- Statistics up to date as of November 18, 2019.

Robert Peyton Gerhart Jr. (born July 21, 1958) is an American former professional stock car racing driver and businessman. He last competed in the ARCA Menards Series, driving the No. 5 Chevrolet SS for Gerhart Racing and the No. 63 Chevy Silverado for his own team in a joint effort with the MB Motorsports team in the Camping World Truck Series. He has won nine times on the ARCA circuit, eight of those victories coming in the season-opening ARCA Daytona 200 at Daytona International Speedway (2012, 2011, 2010, 2007, 2006, 2005, 2002 and 1999).

== Racing career ==
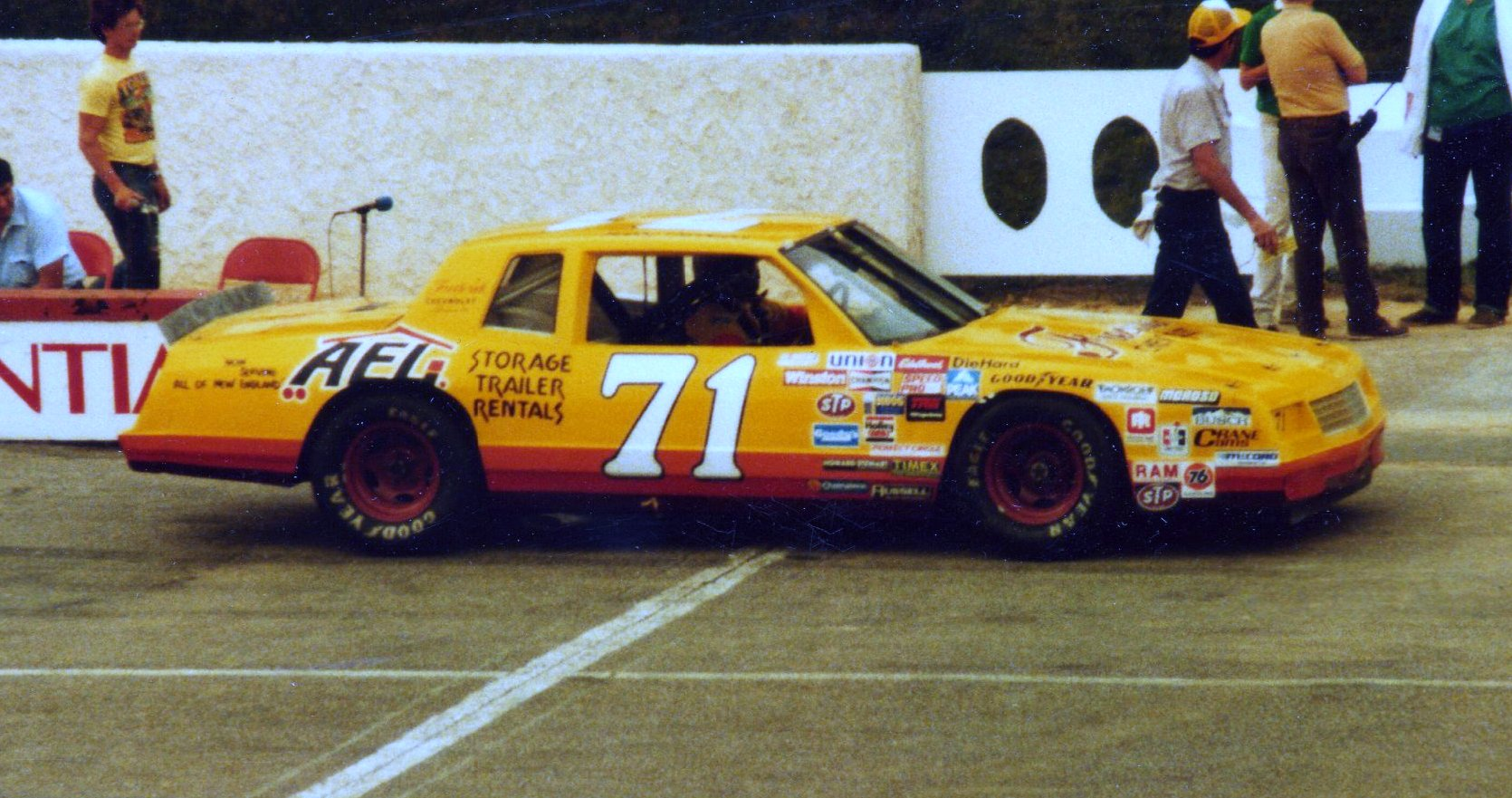
Gerhart in 1984 at Pocono

=== Early racing career ===
Gerhart began racing at Linda's Speedway, where he won his first feature race. He eventually competed in many dirt modified series throughout his home state of Pennsylvania, often competing at Penn National and Susquehanna Speedway. He eventually moved to asphalt racing and competed at Pocono Raceway.

=== ARCA Menards Series ===
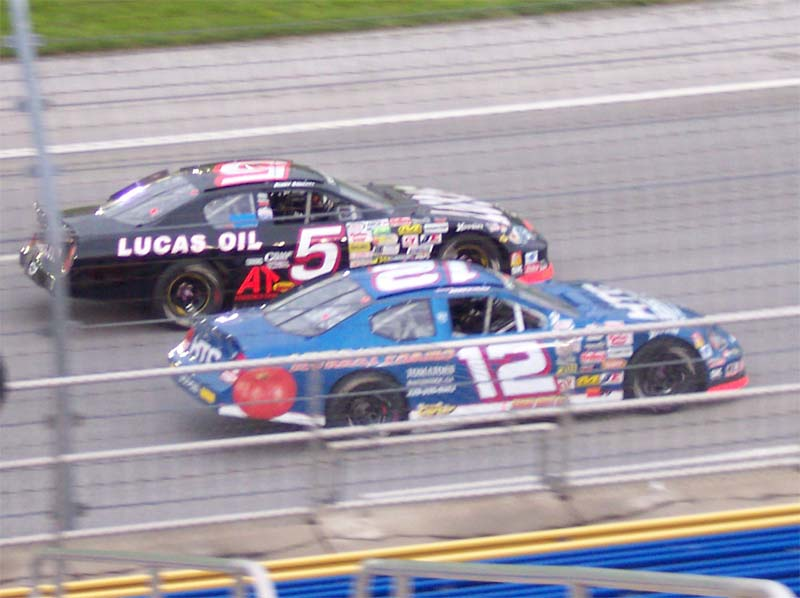
Gerhart's No. 5 car competing at Kentucky Speedway.

In 1988, Gerhart began competing in the ARCA Series and was named Rookie of the Year that season. He has competed in that series on a regular basis since then, returning to NASCAR in 1996 to drive in the Craftsman Truck Series. He and his No. 85 Chevrolet Silverado qualified three times and had a best finish of fifteenth. He returned to Cup in 1998 attempting to qualify the No. 54 and eventually the No. 89 Chevrolet after picking up sponsorship from Kewadin Casinos. He was unable to qualify for those three attempts, but was able to win the season-opening ARCA race at Daytona in 1999, and went on to finish third in points that year.

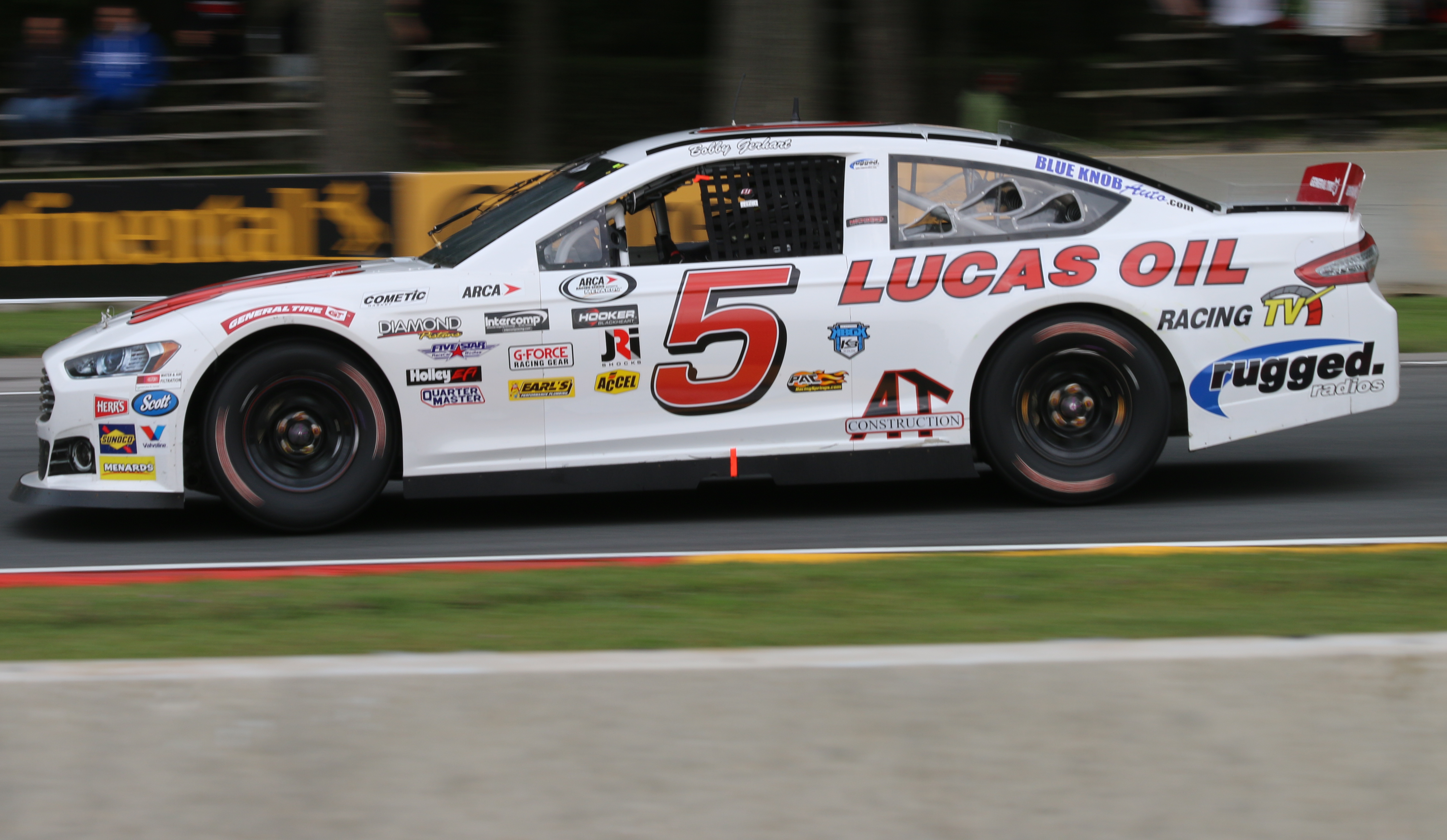
Gerhart in the ARCA Racing Series at Road America in 2017.

Since that time, Gerhart has competed in a mostly limited schedule in ARCA. The lone exception was the 2006 season where he ran full-time and finished second in points. From 2005 to 2007 and again in 2010–12, he won the season opening race at Daytona.

=== NASCAR ===
Gerhart made his NASCAR debut in 1983 at Pocono, finishing thirty-eighth in the Henley Gray-owned Buick. He ran Winston Cup races at Pocono, Dover International Speedway, North Wilkesboro Speedway, Michigan International Speedway, and Daytona International Speedway over the next five years in the No. 71, No. 85, No. 25, and No. 59 Chevrolets with a best finish of nineteenth.

Gerhart made his first starts in the NASCAR Busch Series in 2001, driving four times in his No. 65 and having a best finish of 22nd. In 2009, he returned again to NASCAR in the Nationwide Series to drive the No. 75 for Bob Schacht. At his first race at Talladega Superspeedway, he qualified fifth and ran in the top-twenty for most of the day before wrecking. In 2013, it was announced that Gerhart would attempt to qualify for the DRIVE4COPD 300 in a car owned by him and his brother William Gerhart, numbered 85. However, Gerhart failed to qualify. Gerhart ran a few Nationwide Series races later in the year.

Gerhart qualified for the 2014 DRIVE4COPD 300, finishing 33rd. he failed to qualify his first two attempts at Daytona and Talladega in his own No. 85 car. Gerhart was named as the driver of the JD Motorsports No. 0 Chevrolet Camaro replacing Harrison Rhodes in Chicagoland. Gerhart qualified for the July race in Daytona, finishing 22nd. In October, Gerhart made his first NASCAR Camping World Truck Series start since 1996 driving the 36 truck for MB Motorsports with sponsorship from long time partner Lucas Oil. Gerhart finished twelfth after spending most of the race towards the front of the field. Gerhart planned to do the Daytona triple in 2016, running the ARCA race, the NASCAR Camping World Truck race, and the Xfinity Series race.

== Personal life ==
Gerhart's brother Billy served as his crew chief. Their father is former Eastern Modified champion Bobby Gerhart Sr. Gerhart Sr. began his racing career in Pennsylvania in 1954, and was inducted into the Eastern Motorsport Press Association Hall of Fame in 2002. Other family members in racing include Deacon Gerhart and Dave Gerhart. Gerhart owns Bobby Gerhart's Truck World, a used truck dealership in his hometown.

Prior to the start of the 2020 season, Gerhart suffered a heart attack, forcing him into retirement.

== Motorsports career results ==
=== NASCAR ===
(key) (Bold – Pole position awarded by qualifying time. Italics – Pole position earned by points standings or practice time. * – Most laps led.)

==== Nextel Cup Series ====
NASCAR Nextel Cup Series results
Year	Team	No.	Make	1	2	3	4	5	6	7	8	9	10	11	12	13	14	15	16	17	18	19	20	21	22	23	24	25	26	27	28	29	30	31	32	33	34	35	36	NNCC	Pts	Ref
1983	Gray Racing	19	Buick	DAY	RCH	CAR	ATL	DAR	NWS	MAR	TAL	NSV	DOV	BRI	CLT	RSD	POC; 38	MCH	DAY	NSV	POC; 34	TAL	MCH	BRI	DAR	RCH	DOV	MAR	NWS	CLT	CAR	ATL	RSD							82nd	110	
1984	Gerhart Racing	71	Chevy	DAY	RCH	CAR	ATL	BRI	NWS	DAR	MAR	TAL	NSV	DOV	CLT	RSD	POC; 34	MCH	DAY	NSV	POC; 38	TAL																		50th	262	
1984	Gerhart Racing	59	Chevy																				MCH; DNQ	BRI	DAR	RCH; DNQ	DOV; 39	MAR	CLT	NWS; 19	CAR	ATL	RSD							50th	262	
1985	Gerhart Racing	25	Chevy	DAY	RCH	CAR	ATL	BRI	DAR	NWS; 27	MAR	TAL	DOV	CLT	RSD	POC; 31	MCH	DAY	POC; 24	TAL	MCH; 25	BRI	DAR	RCH	DOV	MAR	NWS; 24	CLT	CAR	ATL	RSD									44th	422	
1986	Gerhart Racing	85	Chevy	DAY	RCH	CAR	ATL	BRI	DAR	NWS; DNQ	MAR	TAL	DOV	CLT	RSD	POC; 34	MCH	DAY	POC; 28	TAL	GLN	MCH; 22	BRI	DAR	RCH	DOV	MAR	NWS	CLT; DNQ	CAR	ATL; 35	RSD								57th	295	
1987	Gerhart Racing	85	Chevy	DAY	CAR	RCH	ATL	DAR	NWS	BRI	MAR	TAL	CLT	DOV	POC; 39	RSD	MCH; DNQ	DAY	POC; 28	TAL	GLN	MCH	BRI	DAR	RCH	DOV; DNQ	MAR	NWS; DNQ	CLT	CAR	RSD	ATL; DNQ								75th	125	
1988	Gerhart Racing	85	Chevy	DAY; DNQ	RCH	CAR	ATL	DAR	BRI	NWS	MAR	TAL	CLT	DOV	RSD	POC; 22	MCH	DAY	POC; 26	TAL	GLN	MCH	BRI	DAR	RCH	DOV; DNQ	MAR	CLT	NWS	CAR	PHO	ATL								55th	182	
1989	Gerhart Racing	85	Chevy	DAY; DNQ	CAR	ATL	RCH	DAR	BRI	NWS	MAR	TAL; DNQ	CLT	DOV	SON																									72nd	94	
1989	Gerhart Racing	85	Olds													POC; 23	MCH	DAY	POC	TAL	GLN	MCH	BRI	DAR	RCH	DOV	MAR	CLT	NWS	CAR	PHO	ATL								72nd	94	
1990	Gerhart Racing	85	Chevy	DAY; DNQ	RCH	CAR	ATL	DAR	BRI	NWS	MAR	TAL; DNQ	CLT	DOV; 33	SON	POC	MCH	DAY	POC; DNQ	TAL	GLN	MCH	BRI	DAR	RCH	DOV	MAR	NWS	CLT	CAR	PHO	ATL								91st	64	
1991	Gerhart Racing	85	Chevy	DAY	RCH	CAR	ATL	DAR	BRI	NWS	MAR	TAL	CLT	DOV; DNQ	SON	POC	MCH	DAY	POC; DNQ	TAL	GLN	MCH	BRI	DAR	RCH	DOV	MAR	NWS	CLT	CAR	PHO	ATL								NA	-	
1992	Gerhart Racing	85	Chevy	DAY	CAR	RCH	ATL	DAR	BRI	NWS	MAR	TAL	CLT	DOV	SON	POC; 32	MCH	DAY; 37	POC	TAL; 34	GLN	MCH	BRI	DAR	RCH	DOV	MAR	NWS	CLT	CAR	PHO	ATL								57th	180	
1998	Gerhart Racing	54	Chevy	DAY	CAR	LVS	ATL	DAR	BRI	TEX	MAR	TAL	CAL	CLT	DOV	RCH	MCH	POC	SON	NHA	POC	IND	GLN	MCH	BRI	NHA	DAR	RCH	DOV	MAR	CLT	TAL; DNQ	DAY	PHO	CAR	ATL				NA	-	
1999	Gerhart Racing	89	Chevy	DAY	CAR	LVS	ATL	DAR	TEX	BRI	MAR	TAL	CAL	RCH	CLT	DOV	MCH	POC	SON	DAY	NHA	POC	IND	GLN	MCH	BRI	DAR	RCH	NHA	DOV	MAR	CLT	TAL; DNQ	CAR	PHO	HOM	ATL			NA	-	
2000	Gerhart Racing	89	Chevy	DAY; DNQ	CAR	LVS	ATL	DAR	BRI	TEX	MAR	TAL	CAL	RCH	CLT	DOV	MCH	POC	SON	DAY	NHA	POC	IND	GLN	MCH	BRI	DAR	RCH	NHA	DOV	MAR	CLT	TAL	CAR	PHO	HOM	ATL			NA	-	
2002	Gerhart Racing	59	Pontiac	DAY; DNQ	CAR	LVS	ATL	DAR	BRI	TEX	MAR	TAL; DNQ	CAL	RCH	CLT	DOV	POC	MCH	SON	DAY	CHI	NHA	POC	IND	GLN	MCH	BRI	DAR	RCH	NHA	DOV	KAN	TAL	CLT	MAR	ATL	CAR	PHO	HOM	NA	-	
2005	Roush Racing	99	Ford	DAY	CAL	LVS	ATL	BRI	MAR	TEX	PHO	TAL	DAR	RCH	CLT	DOV	POC	MCH	SON	DAY	CHI	NHA	POC; QL^{†}	IND	GLN	MCH	BRI	CAL	RCH	NHA	DOV	TAL	KAN	CLT	MAR	ATL	TEX	PHO	HOM	NA	-	
^{†} - Qualified for Carl Edwards

===== Daytona 500 =====
Year	Team	Manufacturer	Start	Finish
1988	Gerhart Racing	Chevy	DNQ	
1989	Gerhart Racing	Chevy	DNQ	
1990	Gerhart Racing	Chevy	DNQ	
2000	Gerhart Racing	Chevy	DNQ	
2002	Gerhart Racing	Pontiac	DNQ	

==== Xfinity Series ====
NASCAR Xfinity Series results
Year	Team	No.	Make	1	2	3	4	5	6	7	8	9	10	11	12	13	14	15	16	17	18	19	20	21	22	23	24	25	26	27	28	29	30	31	32	33	34	35	NXSC	Pts	Ref
2001	Gerhart Racing	65	Chevy	DAY	CAR	LVS	ATL	DAR	BRI	TEX; 40	NSH	TAL; 22	CAL	RCH	NHA; 26	NZH; 33	CLT	DOV	KEN	MLW	GLN	CHI	GTY	PPR	IRP	MCH	BRI	DAR	RCH	DOV	KAN	CLT	MEM	PHO	CAR	HOM			69th	289	
2003	Gerhart Racing	55	Pontiac	DAY	CAR	LVS	DAR	BRI	TEX	TAL; DNQ	NSH	CAL	RCH	GTY	NZH	CLT	DOV	NSH	KEN	MLW	DAY; 24	CHI	NHA	PPR	IRP	MCH	BRI	DAR	RCH	DOV	KAN	CLT	MEM	ATL	PHO	CAR	HOM		126th	91	
2009	Bob Schacht Motorsports	75	Chevy	DAY	CAL	LVS	BRI	TEX	NSH	PHO	TAL; 33	RCH	DAR	CLT	DOV	NSH	KEN	MLW	NHA	DAY; 20	CHI	GTY	IRP	IOW	GLN	MCH	BRI	CGV	ATL	RCH	DOV	KAN	CAL	CLT	MEM	TEX	PHO	HOM	106th	167	
2010	Bob Schacht Motorsports	5	Chevy	DAY; 20	CAL	LVS	BRI	NSH	PHO	TEX																													96th	191	
2010	Bob Schacht Motorsports	75	Chevy								TAL; 25	RCH	DAR	DOV	CLT	NSH	KEN	ROA	NHA	DAY	CHI	GTY	IRP	IOW	GLN	MCH	BRI	CGV	ATL	RCH	DOV	KAN	CAL	CLT	GTY	TEX	PHO	HOM	96th	191	
2013	Gerhart Racing	85	Chevy	DAY; DNQ	PHO	LVS	BRI	CAL	TEX	RCH	TAL; 31	DAR	CLT	DOV	IOW	MCH	ROA	KEN	DAY; 29	NHA	CHI	IND	IOW	GLN	MOH	BRI	ATL	RCH	CHI	KEN	DOV	KAN	CLT	TEX	PHO	HOM			70th	28	
2014	Gerhart Racing	85	Chevy	DAY; 33	PHO	LVS	BRI	CAL	TEX	DAR	RCH	TAL; 36	IOW	CLT	DOV	MCH	ROA	KEN	DAY; DNQ	NHA	CHI	IND	IOW	GLN	MOH	BRI	ATL	RCH	CHI	KEN	DOV	KAN	CLT	TEX	PHO	HOM			68th	19	
2015	Gerhart Racing	85	Chevy	DAY; DNQ	ATL	LVS	PHO	CAL	TEX	BRI	RCH	TAL; DNQ	IOW	CLT	DOV	MCH		DAY; 22	KEN	NHA	IND	IOW	GLN	MOH	BRI	ROA	DAR	RCH	CHI	KEN	DOV	CLT	KAN	TEX	PHO	HOM			63rd	30	
2015	JD Motorsports	0	Chevy														CHI; 36																						63rd	30	
2016	Gerhart Racing	85	Chevy	DAY; 39	ATL	LVS	PHO	CAL	TEX	BRI	RCH	TAL; 33	DOV	CLT	POC	MCH	IOW	DAY; 24	KEN	NHA	IND	IOW	GLN	MOH	BRI	ROA	DAR	RCH	CHI	KEN	DOV	CLT	KAN	TEX	PHO	HOM			60th	27	

==== Gander Outdoors Truck Series ====
NASCAR Gander Outdoors Truck Series results
Year	Team	No.	Make	1	2	3	4	5	6	7	8	9	10	11	12	13	14	15	16	17	18	19	20	21	22	23	24	NGOTC	Pts	Ref
1996	Gerhart Racing	85	Chevy	HOM	PHO	POR	EVG	TUS	CNS	HPT	BRI	NZH	MLW	LVL	I70	IRP	FLM; 26	GLN; 27	NSV	RCH	NHA; 15	MAR	NWS	SON	MMR	PHO	LVS	66th	285	
2015	Gerhart Racing	36	Chevy	DAY	ATL	MAR	KAN	CLT	DOV	TEX	GTW	IOW	KEN	ELD	POC	MCH	BRI	MSP	CHI	NHA	LVS	TAL; 12	MAR	TEX	PHO	HOM		97th	0^{1}	
2016	Gerhart Racing	36	Chevy	DAY; 12	ATL	MAR	KAN	DOV	CLT	TEX	IOW	GTW	KEN	ELD	POC	BRI	MCH	MSP	CHI	NHA	LVS	TAL; 17	MAR	TEX	PHO	HOM		89th	0^{1}	
2017	Gerhart Racing	63	Chevy	DAY; 21	ATL	MAR	KAN	CLT	DOV	TEX	GTW	IOW	KEN	ELD	POC	MCH	BRI	MSP	CHI	NHA	LVS	TAL; 11	MAR	TEX	PHO	HOM		45th	42	
2018	Gerhart Racing	63	Chevy	DAY; DNQ	ATL	LVS	MAR	DOV	KAN	CLT	TEX	IOW	GTW	CHI	KEN	ELD	POC	MCH	BRI	MSP	LVS	TAL; 23	MAR	TEX	PHO	HOM		74th	14	
2019	Copp Motorsports	63	Chevy	DAY; 11	ATL	LVS	MAR	TEX	DOV	KAN	CLT	TEX	IOW	GTW	CHI	KEN	POC	ELD	MCH	BRI	MSP	LVS	TAL	MAR	PHO	HOM		64th	26	

=== ARCA Menards Series ===
(key) (Bold – Pole position awarded by qualifying time. Italics – Pole position earned by points standings or practice time. * – Most laps led.)

ARCA Menards Series results
Year	Team	No.	Make	1	2	3	4	5	6	7	8	9	10	11	12	13	14	15	16	17	18	19	20	21	22	23	24	25	AMSC	Pts	Ref
1988	Gerhart Racing	85	Chevy	DAY; 13	ATL; 27	TAL; 19		PCS; 4		POC; 6	WIN		ACS; 18		POC; 11	TAL; 6	DEL; 4	FRS; 10	ISF; 11	DSF; 7	SLM; 7	ATL; 15							8th	2975	
1988	Gerhart Racing	85	Olds				FRS; 17																						8th	2975	
1988	Gerhart Racing	85	Buick						ROC; 25			KIL; 13		SLM; 9															8th	2975	
1989	Gerhart Racing	85	Chevy	DAY; 36	ATL; 31	KIL; 11	TAL; 26	FRS			HAG; 3					ISF; 26	TOL	DSF	SLM	ATL									21st	880	
1989	Gerhart Racing	85	Olds						POC; 25	KIL		POC; 7	TAL; 4	DEL	FRS														21st	880	
1990	Gerhart Racing	85	Chevy	DAY; 14	ATL; 11	KIL; 11	TAL; 28	FRS; 8	POC; 7	KIL	TOL	HAG; 12		TAL; 28		ISF; 26	TOL	DSF; 18	WIN	DEL	ATL; 7								9th	2305	
1990	Gerhart Racing	85	Olds										POC; 8		MCH; 20														9th	2305	
1991	Gerhart Racing	85	Chevy	DAY; 12	ATL; 12	KIL; 5	TAL; 7	TOL; 14	FRS; 13	POC; 6	MCH; 11	KIL; 5	FRS; 3	DEL; 15	POC; 6	TAL; 24	HPT; 4	MCH; 9	ISF; 22	TOL; 8	DSF; 22	TWS; 4	ATL; 28						5th	4565	
1992	Gerhart Racing	85	Chevy	DAY; 22	FIF	TWS; 23	TAL; 37	TOL	KIL	POC; 27	MCH	FRS	KIL	NSH	DEL	POC						TWS; 24	SLM	ATL					31st		
1992	Gerhart Racing	85	Buick														HPT; 21	FRS	ISF	TOL	DSF								31st		
1993	Gerhart Racing	85	Chevy	DAY; 32	FIF	TWS	TAL	KIL	CMS	FRS	TOL	POC	MCH	FRS	POC	KIL	ISF	DSF	TOL	SLM	WIN	ATL							116th		
1994	Gerhart Racing	85	Chevy	DAY; 35	TAL; 15	FIF	LVL	KIL	TOL	FRS	MCH	DMS	POC; 31	POC; 7	KIL	FRS	INF	I70	ISF	DSF	TOL	SLM	WIN	ATL					40th	480	
1995	Gerhart Racing	85	Chevy	DAY; 37	ATL	TAL; 12	FIF	KIL	FRS	MCH	I80	MCS	FRS	POC; 24	POC; 25	KIL	FRS	SBS	LVL	ISF	DSF	SLM	WIN	ATL; 26					44th	780	
1996	Gerhart Racing	85	Chevy	DAY; 10	ATL	SLM	TAL; 7	FIF	LVL	CLT	CLT	KIL	FRS	POC; 5	MCH; 8	FRS	TOL	POC; 17	MCH; 29	INF	SBS	ISF	DSF	KIL	SLM	WIN	CLT	ATL; 27	34th		
1997	Gerhart Racing	85	Chevy	DAY; 17	ATL; 36	SLM	CLT	CLT; 13	POC; 20	MCH; 26	SBS	TOL	KIL	FRS	MIN; 5	POC; 5	MCH; 4	DSF; 22	GTW; 8	SLM	WIN	CLT; 36	TAL; 3	ISF; 5	ATL; 8				10th	2245	
1998	Gerhart Racing	5	Chevy	DAY; 8	ATL; 31	SLM	CLT; 21	MEM; 6	**MCH**; 4	POC; 17	SBS	TOL	PPR; 27	POC; 22	KIL	FRS	ISF; 36	ATL; 9	DSF; 29	SLM	TEX; 4	WIN	CLT; 11	TAL; 30	ATL; 10				14th	2425	
1999	Gerhart Racing	5	Chevy	DAY; 1*	ATL; 6	SLM; 21	AND; 14	CLT; 5	MCH; 5	POC; 7	TOL; 7	SBS; 8	BLN; 11	POC; 9	KIL; 23	FRS; 14	FLM; 2	ISF; 8	WIN; 14	DSF; 11	SLM; 8	CLT; 30	TAL; 37	ATL; 11					3rd	4890	
2000	Gerhart Racing	5	Chevy	DAY; 2	SLM; 27	AND; 2	CLT; 28	KIL; 5	FRS; 12	MCH; 35	POC; 17	TOL; 4	KEN; 12	BLN; 14	POC; 18	**WIN**; 4	ISF; 6	KEN; 5	DSF; 12	SLM; 11	CLT; 26	TAL; 5	ATL; 16						5th	4330	
2001	Gerhart Racing	5	Chevy	DAY; 6	NSH	WIN	SLM	GTY	KEN	CLT	KAN	MCH; 28	POC; 6	MEM				POC; 30	NSH	ISF	CHI	DSF	SLM	TOL	BLN	CLT			37th	970	
2001	Steele Racing	16	Chevy												GLN; 17	KEN	MCH												37th	970	
2001	Gerhart Racing	5	Pontiac																								**TAL**; 1*	ATL	37th	970	
2002	Gerhart Racing	5	Pontiac	DAY; 1*	ATL	NSH	SLM	KEN	CLT	KAN														**TAL**; 26	CLT				27th	1195	
2002	Gerhart Racing	5	Chevy								POC; 5	MCH; 7	TOL	SBO; 4	KEN	BLN	POC; 4	NSH	ISF	WIN	DSF	CHI	SLM						27th	1195	
2003	Gerhart Racing	5	Pontiac	**DAY**; 14*	ATL	NSH	SLM	TOL	KEN	CLT	BLN	KAN	MCH; 20		POC; 7	POC; 32	NSH	ISF	WIN; 11	DSF	CHI		TAL; 36	CLT					21st	1305	
2003	Gerhart Racing	5	Chevy											LER; 7								SLM; 29			SBO; 14				21st	1305	
2004	Gerhart Racing	5	Chevy	**DAY**; 6	NSH	SLM	KEN	TOL	CLT	KAN		MCH; 8	SBO; 14	BLN				LER; 7			TOL; 4	DSF	CHI	SLM	TAL; 20				19th	2030	
2004	Gerhart Racing	5	Pontiac								POC; 5					GTW; 9	POC; 3												19th	2030	
2004	Gerhart Racing	7	Pontiac												KEN; 10				NSH; 27	ISF									19th	2030	
2005	Gerhart Racing	5	Chevy	**DAY**; 1*	NSH; 41	SLM	KEN	TOL; 16	LAN	MIL; 5	POC; 10	MCH; 34	KAN; 4	KEN; 9	BLN	POC; 7	GTW; 12	LER; 5	NSH; 15	MCH	ISF	TOL; 11	DSF	CHI; 16	SLM	TAL; 3			20th	2555	
2006	Gerhart Racing	5	Chevy	**DAY**; 1*	NSH; 16	SLM; 3	WIN; 5	KEN; 20	TOL; 10	POC; 5	MCH; 15	KAN; 6	KEN; 8	BLN; 15	POC; 6	GTW; 15	NSH; 7	MCH; 18	ISF; 27	MIL; 10	TOL; 26	DSF; 8	CHI; 17	SLM; 8	**TAL**; 7	IOW; 14			2nd	5265	
2007	Gerhart Racing	5	Chevy	DAY; 1*	USA; 26	NSH; 14		KAN; 9	WIN; 4	KEN; 11	TOL; 5	IOW; 6	POC; 10	MCH; 11	BLN; 6	KEN; 22	POC; 28	NSH	ISF	MIL	GTW	DSF	CHI	SLM	TAL	TOL			19th	2845	
2007	Gerhart Racing	5	Pontiac				SLM; 27																						19th	2845	
2008	Gerhart Racing	5	Chevy	DAY; 4	SLM; 23	IOW; 15	KAN; 21	CAR; 41	KEN; 16	TOL; 17	POC; 4	MCH; 17	CAY	KEN; 32	BLN	POC; 23	NSH; 22	ISF	DSF	CHI; 13	SLM	NJE	TAL; 3	TOL; 23					22nd	2590	
2009	Gerhart Racing	5	Chevy	DAY; 19	SLM	CAR	TAL; 26	KEN	TOL	POC; 12	MCH; 14	MFD	IOW	KEN; 15	BLN	POC; 9	ISF	CHI; 14	TOL	DSF	NJE	SLM	KAN; 20	CAR					30th	1195	
2010	Gerhart Racing	5	Chevy	DAY; 1*	PBE	SLM	TEX	TAL; 28	TOL	POC; 9	MCH; 14	IOW; 26	MFD	POC; 14	BLN	NJE	ISF	CHI; 9	DSF	TOL	SLM	KAN; 17	CAR						23rd	1260	
2011	Gerhart Racing	5	Chevy	DAY; 1*	TAL; 3	SLM	TOL	NJE	CHI; 22	POC; 13	MCH; 12	WIN	BLN	IOW; 31	IRP; 18	POC; 18	ISF	MAD	DSF	SLM	KAN; 22	TOL; 19							20th	1515	
2012	Gerhart Racing	5	Chevy	DAY; 1	MOB	SLM	TAL; 42	TOL; 20	ELK	POC; 25	MCH; 27	WIN	NJE	IOW; 14	CHI; 17	IRP; 19	POC; 16	BLN	ISF	MAD	SLM	DSF	KAN; 20						24th	1310	
2013	Gerhart Racing	5	Chevy	DAY; 29*	MOB	SLM	TAL; 24	TOL; 16	ELK	POC; 19	MCH	ROA	WIN	CHI	NJE	POC; 17	BLN; 13	ISF; 15	MAD	DSF	IOW; 20	SLM	KEN; 13	KAN; 17					16th	1655	
2014	Gerhart Racing	5	Chevy	DAY; 6	MOB	SLM	TAL; 7	TOL	NJE	POC; 12	MCH	ELK	WIN	CHI	IRP; 18	POC; 23	BLN	ISF	MAD	DSF	SLM	KEN; 17	KAN; 27						27th	1065	
2015	Gerhart Racing	5	Chevy	DAY; 39	MOB	NSH	SLM	TAL; 26	TOL; 32	NJE	POC; 9	MCH	CHI; 11	WIN	IOW; 16	IRP; 14	POC; 9	BLN	ISF	DSF	SLM	KEN; 25	KAN						25th	1125	
2016	Gerhart Racing	5	Chevy	DAY; 37	NSH	SLM	TAL; 20	TOL	NJE	POC; 16	MCH	MAD	WIN	IOW	IRP; 11	POC; 27	BLN	ISF	DSF	SLM	CHI; 16	KEN	KAN						36th	750	
2017	Gerhart Racing	5	Chevy	DAY; 15	NSH; 24	SLM	TAL; 7	TOL; 13	ELK	POC; 17	MCH	MAD	IOW	IRP; 12	POC; 19	WIN; 18	ISF												18th	1360	
2017	Gerhart Racing	5	Ford															ROA; 17	DSF	SLM	CHI	KEN	KAN						18th	1360	
2018	Gerhart Racing	5	Chevy	DAY; 12	NSH	SLM	TAL; 8	TOL	CLT	POC; 16	MCH	MAD	GTW; 14	CHI	IOW	ELK	POC; 24	ISF	BLN; 20	DSF	SLM	IRP; 17	KAN						23rd	975	
2019	Gerhart Racing	5	Chevy	DAY; 13	FIF	SLM	TAL; 13	NSH	TOL	CLT	POC; 16	MCH	MAD	GTW	CHI	ELK	IOW	POC; 12	ISF; 14	DSF; 12	SLM	IRP; 11	KAN						22nd	1155	

^{*} Season still in progress
^{1} Ineligible for series points
