= Bobby Gerhart Racing =

American stock car racing team

Gerhart Racing
- Owner(s): Bobby Gerhart; Billy Gerhart
- Series: ARCA Menards Series
- Race drivers: 5. Dale Quarterley
- Manufacturer: Chevrolet
- Opened: 1984

Gerhart Racing is an American professional stock car racing team that currently competes in the ARCA Menards Series. The team is owned by Bobby Gerhart and his brother Billy Gerhart, who is also the crew chief and lead mechanic. Due to Gerhart suffering a heart attack in December of 2019, the team has been inactive. After laying dormant for two seasons, the No. 5 returned in 2022, with Dale Quarterley driving at Daytona.

== Cup Series ==
=== Car No. 85 History ===
After starting his Winston Cup career with Gray Racing, Gerhart brought his own cars to Cup events starting in 1984. Qualifying for 22 races, the team used Nos. 71 and 59 in 1984, No. 25 in 1985, and No. 85 from 1986 and on. The team had a best finish of 19th at North Wilkesboro Speedway, but ran most of its races at Pocono Raceway, near the team's shop. The team also failed to qualify for 22 races, five of them Daytona 500's. The team has not entered a Cup race since 2002.

== Xfinity Series ==
=== Car No. 85 history ===
After several years of driving for Bob Schacht in NASCAR's second series, Gerhart moved his ARCA team to the Nationwide in 2013, attempting just three races: the two races at Daytona International Speedway and the race at Talladega Superspeedway. With Gerhart driving, the team qualified for the Talladega and the later Daytona race with funding from Lucas Oil. 2014 brought a similar mantra for the team: attempt the three restrictor plate races. Gerhart made two of them, the spring Daytona and Talladega, while failing to qualify for the summer Daytona race. In 2015, Gerhart made one of the three races he attempted with the team, the Subway Firecracker 250. He failed to qualify for the PowerShares QQQ 300 and the Winn-Dixie 300. Known for running well at restrictor plate tracks, Gerhart attempted and made the first two plate races of the 2016 season, crashing at Daytona and turning in a 33rd place finish at Talladega.

==== Car No. 85 results ====
NASCAR Xfinity Series results
Year	Driver	No.	Make	1	2	3	4	5	6	7	8	9	10	11	12	13	14	15	16	17	18	19	20	21	22	23	24	25	26	27	28	29	30	31	32	33	Owners	Pts
2013	Bobby Gerhart	85	Chevy	DAY; DNQ	PHO	LVS	BRI	CAL	TEX	RCH	TAL; 31	DAR	CLT	DOV	IOW	MCH	ROA	KEN	DAY; 29	NHA	CHI	IND	IOW	GLN	MOH	BRI	ATL	RCH	CHI	KEN	DOV	KAN	CLT	TEX	PHO	HOM	56th	28
2014	Bobby Gerhart	85	Chevy	DAY; 33	PHO	LVS	BRI	CAL	TEX	DAR	RCH	TAL; 36	IOW	CLT	DOV	MCH	ROA	KEN	DAY; DNQ	NHA	CHI	IND	IOW	GLN	MOH	BRI	ATL	RCH	CHI	KEN	DOV	KAN	CLT	TEX	PHO	HOM	57th	19
2015	Bobby Gerhart	85	Chevy	DAY; DNQ	ATL	LVS	PHO	CAL	TEX	BRI	RCH	TAL; DNQ	IOW	CLT	DOV	MCH	CHI	DAY; 22	KEN	NHA	IND	IOW	GLN	MOH	BRI	ROA	DAR	RCH	CHI	KEN	DOV	CLT	KAN	TEX	PHO	HOM	51st	22
2016	Bobby Gerhart	85	Chevy	DAY; 39	ATL	LVS	PHO	CAL	TEX	BRI	RCH	TAL; 33	DOV	CLT	POC	MCH	IOW	DAY; 24	KEN	NHA	IND	IOW	GLN	MOH	BRI	ROA	DAR	RCH	CHI	KEN	DOV	CLT	KAN	TEX	PHO	HOM	54th	27

== Gander Outdoors Truck Series ==
=== Truck No. 36 history ===
Gerhart drove this truck in the 2015 Truck race at Talladega, sticking to the theme of restrictor plate tracks. In 2016, the team attempted the season-opening NextEra Energy Resources 250 at Daytona. Gerhart equaled his 2015 Talladega result with a 12th place finish.

=== Truck No. 63 history ===
In 2017, Gerhart drove this truck in the season-opening NextEra Energy Resources 250 at Daytona. He was involved in the big one just in the initial laps but suffered only minor damages but that turned out in a radiator failure later in the race. Bobby finished in 21st place. He drove the 63 at Daytona and Talladega the next year. In the 2019 Daytona race, he was involved in a late overtime crash but earned an 11th place finish.

== ARCA Menards Series ==
=== Car No. 5 history ===
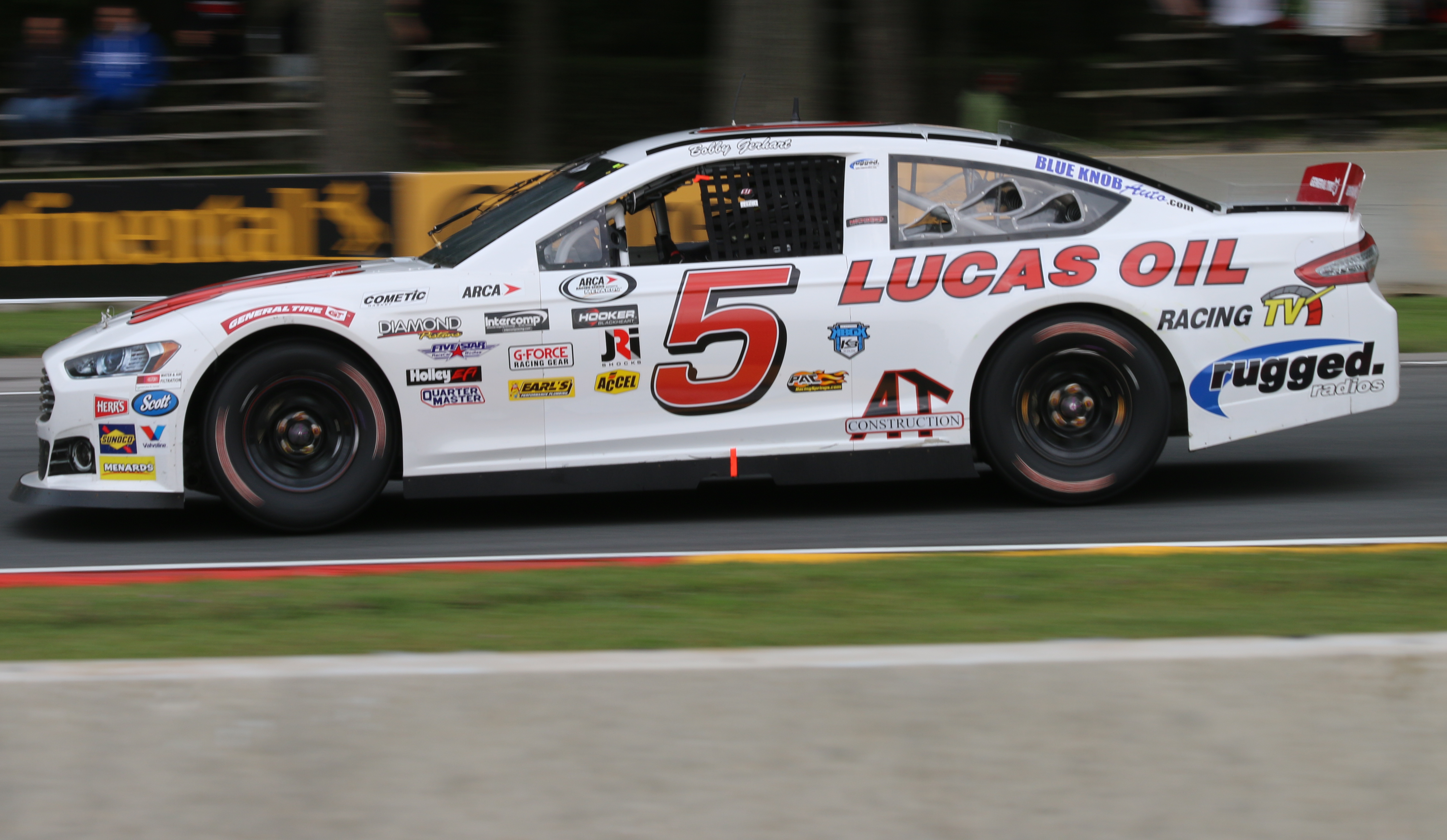
The No. 5 car at Road America in 2017

Since 1988, Gerhart has competed for his self-owned team in the ARCA Racing Series. All 9 of his ARCA wins came at Daytona and Talladega. On two separate occasions, Gerhart won 3 straight races at Daytona, from 2005–2007, and again from 2010–2012. Gerhart's best ARCA performance was in the 2006 season, running the full schedule since the 2000 season, and finishing 2nd in points to Frank Kimmel. Gerhart has typically run the majority of the season since 2007, with other teams leasing his points to run races.

In 2022, Dale Quarterley tested a BGR car at Daytona. BGR and Quarterley would run the 2022 ARCA season opener at Daytona.
