= Norm Benning Racing =

NASCAR team

- Owner: Norm Benning
- Base: Level Green, Pennsylvania
- Series: NASCAR Craftsman Truck Series
- Race drivers: 6. Norm Benning (part-time)
- Manufacturer: Chevrolet
- Opened: 1993

Career
- Debut: Busch Series: 2003 Goulds Pumps/ITT Industries 200 (Nazareth); Craftsman Truck Series: 2008 Toyota Tundra 200 (Nashville); ARCA Re/Max Series: 1995 Hoosier General Tire 500K (Atlanta)
- Latest race: Busch Series: 2004 Goulds Pumps/ITT Industries 200 (Nazareth); Craftsman Truck Series: 2025 Slim Jim 200 (Martinsville); ARCA Re/Max Series: 2009 Rockingham ARCA 200 (Rockingham)
- Races competed: Total: 559; Busch Series: 3 Craftsman Truck Series: 258; ARCA Re/Max Series: 298
- Drivers' Championships: Total: 0 Busch Series: 0 Craftsman Truck Series: 0 ARCA Re/Max Series: 0
- Race victories: Total: 0 Busch Series: 0 Craftsman Truck Series: 0 ARCA Re/Max Series: 0
- Pole positions: Total: 0 Busch Series: 0 Craftsman Truck Series: 0 ARCA Re/Max Series: 0

Norm Benning Racing is an American professional stock car racing team that currently competes part-time in the NASCAR Craftsman Truck Series. The team is owned by Norm Benning, who drives the No. 6 Chevrolet Silverado.

== History ==
Norm Benning Racing opened in 1993, DNQ'ing all attempts by team owner Norm Benning in Cup competition. Benning began fielding the No. 8 and 84 car in the ARCA Racing Series in 1995 for himself and other drivers. Benning ran the team in four Nationwide races from 2003–2004.

The team's most success has been found in the Truck Series. Despite not having the budget to compete for good finishes, the team has attempted races every year since 2008, with the number of entries varying. In 2013, Benning gained national notoriety after his battle during the Last Chance Qualifier for the inaugural Mudsummer Classic at Eldora Speedway, barely finishing in the final transfer position over Clay Greenfield. 2025's season opener at Daytona saw Benning become the oldest driver in NASCAR's national series history to finish a race on the lead lap, finishing 16th at age 73.

== Sprint Cup Series ==
=== Car No. 57 history ===
Benning attempted the Daytona 500 in the No. 57 four times from 2008 to 2011 and did not qualify a single time. In 2008 he had to withdraw after having fuel pump issues, while in 2011 he was forced to withdraw from the race because his car did not meet minimum speed.

==== Car No. 57 results ====
Year	Driver	No.	Make	1	2	3	4	5	6	7	8	9	10	11	12	13	14	15	16	17	18	19	20	21	22	23	24	25	26	27	28	29	30	31	32	33	34	35	36	Owners	Pts
2008	Norm Benning	57	Chevy	DAY; Wth	CAL	LVS	ATL	BRI	MAR	TEX	PHO	TAL	RCH	DAR	CLT	DOV	POC	MCH	SON	NHA	DAY	CHI	IND	POC	GLN	MCH	BRI	CAL	RCH	NHA	DOV	KAN	TAL	CLT	MAR	ATL	TEX	PHO	HOM		
2009	Norm Benning	57	Chevy	DAY; DNQ	CAL	LVS	ATL	BRI	MAR	TEX	PHO	TAL	RCH	DAR	CLT	DOV	POC	MCH	SON	NHA	DAY	CHI	IND	POC	GLN	MCH	BRI	ATL	RCH	NHA	DOV	KAN	CAL	CLT	MAR	TAL	TEX	PHO	HOM		
2010	Norm Benning	57	Chevy	DAY; DNQ	CAL	LVS	ATL	BRI	MAR	PHO	TEX	TAL	RCH	DAR	DOV	CLT	POC	MCH	SON	NHA	DAY	CHI	IND	POC	GLN	MCH	BRI	ATL	RCH	NHA	DOV	KAN	CAL	CLT	MAR	TAL	TEX	PHO	HOM		
2011	Norm Benning	57	Chevy	DAY; Wth	PHO	LVS	BRI	CAL	MAR	TEX	TAL	RCH	DAR	DOV	CLT	KAN	POC	MCH	SON	DAY	KEN	NHA	IND	POC	GLN	MCH	BRI	ATL	RCH	CHI	NHA	DOV	KAN	CLT	TAL	MAR	TEX	PHO	HOM		

=== Car No. 84 history ===
Benning began fielding the No. 84 in Winston Cup Series in 1993, finding very little success because of a lack of sponsorship and quality parts. Benning attempted the Daytona 500 in the No. 84 four times. First, in 1997 and from 2000 to 2002. He did not qualify a single time, whether it was due to mechanical failures or not transferring in through the duels.

==== Car No. 84 results ====
Year	Driver	No.	Make	1	2	3	4	5	6	7	8	9	10	11	12	13	14	15	16	17	18	19	20	21	22	23	24	25	26	27	28	29	30	31	32	33	34	35	36	Owners	Pts
1993	Norm Benning	84	Olds	DAY	CAR	RCH	ATL	DAR	BRI	NWS	MAR	TAL	SON	CLT	DOV	POC	MCH	DAY	NHA	POC	TAL	GLN	MCH	BRI	DAR	RCH	DOV; DNQ	MAR	NWS	CLT	CAR	PHO	ATL								
1994	Norm Benning	84	Olds	DAY	CAR	RCH	ATL	DAR; DNQ	BRI	NWS	MAR	TAL	SON	CLT	DOV; DNQ	POC	MCH	DAY	NHA	POC	TAL	IND; DNQ	GLN	MCH	BRI	DAR	RCH				CLT; DNQ										
1994	Norm Benning	84	Ford																									DOV; DNQ	MAR	NWS		CAR; DNQ	PHO	ATL							
1995	Norm Benning	84	Ford	DAY	CAR	RCH	ATL	DAR	BRI	NWS	MAR	TAL	SON	CLT	DOV	POC	MCH	DAY	NHA	POC	TAL	IND	GLN	MCH	BRI	DAR	RCH	DOV	MAR	NWS	CLT	CAR; DNQ	PHO	ATL							
1997	Norm Benning	84	Chevy	DAY; DNQ	CAR	RCH	ATL	DAR	TEX	BRI	MAR	SON	TAL	CLT	DOV	POC	MCH	CAL	DAY	NHA	POC	IND	GLN	MCH	BRI	DAR	RCH	NHA	DOV	MAR	CLT	TAL	CAR	PHO	ATL						
2000	Norm Benning	84	Chevy	DAY; DNQ	CAR	LVS	ATL	DAR	BRI	TEX	MAR	TAL	CAL	RCH	CLT	DOV	MCH	POC	SON	DAY	NHA	POC	IND	GLN	MCH	BRI	DAR	RCH	NHA	DOV	MAR	CLT	TAL	CAR	PHO	HOM; DNQ	ATL; DNQ				
2001	Norm Benning	84	Chevy	DAY; DNQ	CAR	LVS	ATL	DAR	BRI	TEX	MAR	TAL	CAL	RCH	CLT	DOV	MCH	POC	SON	DAY	CHI	NHA	POC	IND	GLN	MCH	BRI	DAR	RCH	DOV	KAN	CLT	MAR	TAL	PHO	CAR	HOM	ATL	NHA		
2002	Norm Benning	84	Chevy	DAY; DNQ	CAR	LVS	ATL	DAR	BRI	TEX	MAR	TAL	CAL	RCH	CLT	DOV	POC	MCH	SON	DAY	CHI	NHA	POC	IND	GLN	MCH	BRI	DAR	RCH	NHA	DOV	KAN	TAL	CLT	MAR	ATL	CAR	PHO	HOM		
2003	Norm Benning	84	Chevy	DAY; Wth	CAR	LVS	ATL	DAR	BRI	TEX	TAL	MAR	CAL	RCH	CLT	DOV	POC	MCH	SON	DAY	CHI	NHA	POC	IND	GLN	MCH	BRI	DAR	RCH	NHA	DOV	TAL	KAN	CLT	MAR	ATL	PHO	CAR	HOM		

== Busch Series ==
=== Car No. 8 History ===
In 2002, the made their Busch Series debut at Homestead with Benning as the driver. He failed to qualify. In 2003, the 8 car made a return at Nazareth Speedway with Benning as the driver. He finished 40th.

==== Car No. 8 results ====
Year	Driver	No.	Make	1	2	3	4	5	6	7	8	9	10	11	12	13	14	15	16	17	18	19	20	21	22	23	24	25	26	27	28	29	30	31	32	33	34	Owners	Pts
2002	Norm Benning	8	Chevy	DAY	CAR	LVS	DAR	BRI	TEX	NSH	TAL	CAL	RCH	NHA	NZH	CLT	DOV	NSH	KEN	MLW	DAY	CHI	GTY	PPR	IRP	MCH	BRI	DAR	RCH	DOV	KAN	CLT	MEM	ATL	CAR	PHO	HOM; DNQ	N/A	0
2003	Norm Benning	8	Chevy	DAY	CAR	LVS	DAR	BRI	TEX	TAL	NSH	CAL	RCH	GTY	NZH; 40	CLT	DOV	NSH	KEN	MLW	DAY	CHI	NHA	PPR	IRP	MCH	BRI; DNQ	DAR	RCH	DOV	KAN	CLT	MEM	ATL	PHO	CAR	HOM	86th	165

=== Car No. 81 History ===
In 2003, the team fielded the 81 car at Rockingham with Benning as the driver. He failed to qualify. In 2004, the 81 car made a return at Nazareth Speedway with Benning as the driver. He finished 38th.

==== Car No. 81 results ====
Year	Driver	No.	Make	1	2	3	4	5	6	7	8	9	10	11	12	13	14	15	16	17	18	19	20	21	22	23	24	25	26	27	28	29	30	31	32	33	34	Owners	Pts
2003	Norm Benning	81	Chevy	DAY	CAR	LVS	DAR	BRI	TEX	TAL	NSH	CAL	RCH	GTY	NZH	CLT	DOV	NSH	KEN	MLW	DAY	CHI	NHA	PPR	IRP	MCH	BRI	DAR	RCH	DOV	KAN	CLT	MEM	ATL	PHO	CAR; DNQ	HOM	86th	165
2004	Norm Benning	81	Chevy	DAY	CAR	LVS	DAR	BRI	TEX	NSH	TAL	CAL	GTY	RCH	NZH; 38	CLT	DOV	NSH	KEN	MLW	DAY	CHI	NHA	PPR	IRP	MCH	BRI	CAL	RCH	DOV	KAN	CLT	MEM	ATL	PHO	DAR; DNQ	HOM	89th	104

=== Car No. 84 History ===
In 2003, Benning fielded the 84 car for three races. He failed to qualify for two races. In 2004, Benning also fielded the 84 car for three races. He failed to qualify on all attempts.

==== Car No. 84 results ====
Year	Driver	No.	Make	1	2	3	4	5	6	7	8	9	10	11	12	13	14	15	16	17	18	19	20	21	22	23	24	25	26	27	28	29	30	31	32	33	34	Owners	Pts
2003	Norm Benning	84	Chevy	DAY	CAR	LVS	DAR	BRI	TEX	TAL	NSH; DNQ	CAL	RCH	GTY	NZH	CLT	DOV	NSH	KEN	MLW	DAY	CHI	NHA; 36	PPR	IRP; DNQ	MCH	BRI	DAR	RCH	DOV	KAN	CLT	MEM	ATL	PHO	CAR	HOM	86th	165
2004	Norm Benning	84	Chevy	DAY; DNQ	CAR	LVS	DAR; DNQ	BRI	TEX	NSH; DNQ	TAL	CAL	GTY	RCH	NZH	CLT	DOV	NSH	KEN	MLW	DAY	CHI	NHA	PPR	IRP	MCH	BRI	CAL	RCH	DOV	KAN	CLT	MEM	ATL	PHO	DAR	HOM	89th	104

== Craftsman Truck Series ==
=== Truck No. 6 History ===
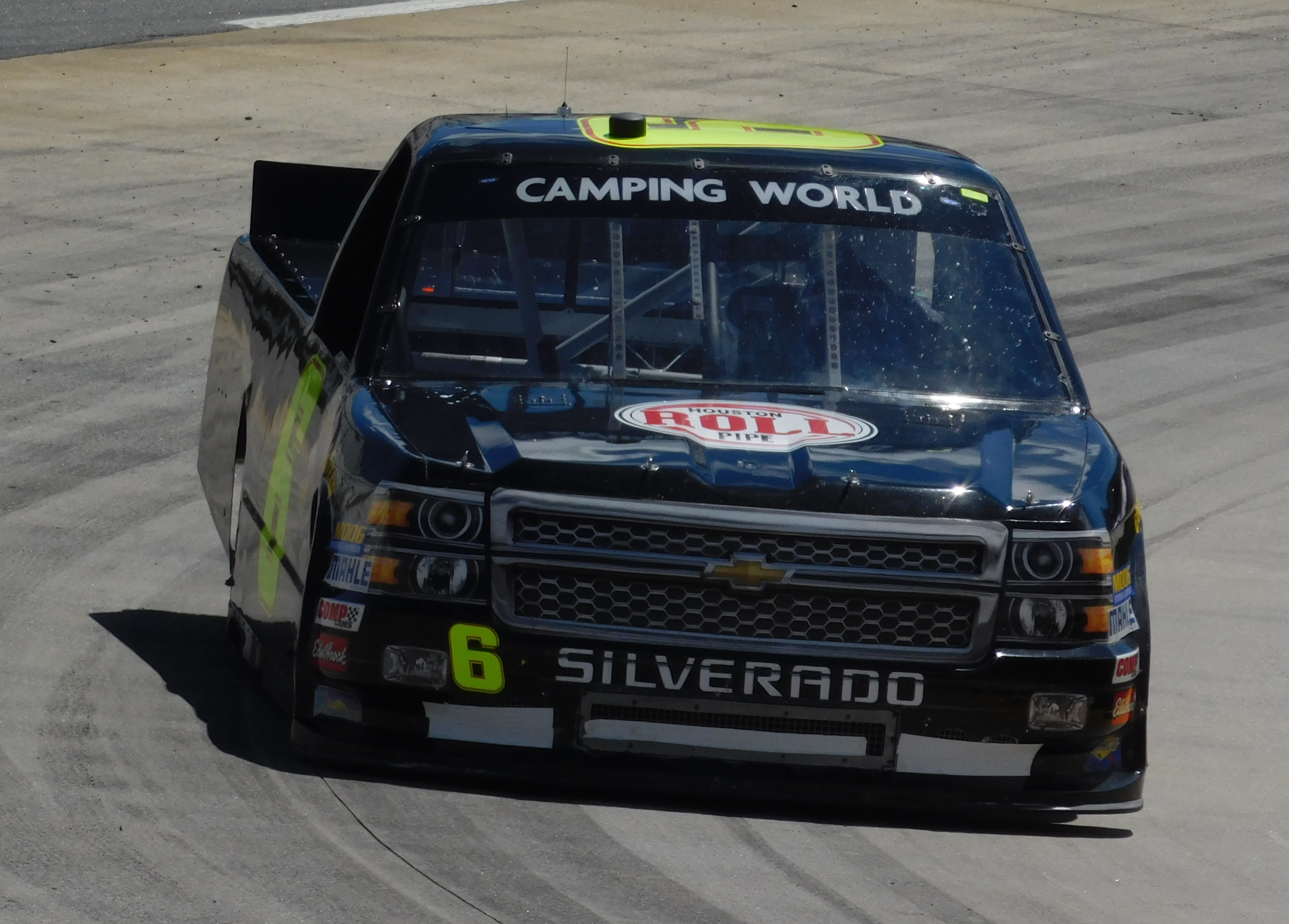
The No. 6 truck at Martinsville Speedway in 2017

Midway through 2014 season, Norm changed his iconic 57 to the number 6 on his truck. The 2015 season began on a high note as Benning finished 14th at Daytona. However, the remainder of the season would prove to be very difficult. Lack of sponsorship would force Benning to do several start and parks. Towards the end of the season, the 6 began missing races as the poor finishes left the team ranking lower in points, plus the fields being cut from 36 to 32 trucks. 2016 would be a disastrous season, as the team failed to make any of the first eight races. Ryan Ellis and Sean Corr would also each have a start in the No. 6 truck in 2016.

Once again, 2017 began on a low note, with Benning missing the first three races of the season. He was eventually able to make the fourth race of the season at Kansas. Benning would also strike a deal with GMS Racing, purchasing the owner points from the No. 24 team, locking him into all the remaining races. In 2018, Benning would again return and was running in the top-ten at Daytona, but a fuel pump issue resulted in a fourteenth place finish. Benning's next highlight would come at Eldora, where he would have a strong run in his heat race. In the closing laps of the main event, Benning would be involved in an accident that saw the driver's side door ripped off the car. Benning missed the season opener at Daytona for the sixth time in 2019. However, he managed to finish seventeenth at Texas Motor Speedway and got another top-twenty at Talladega Superspeedway.

In 2020, Benning missed the first three races he attempted. For the first time since 2008, he didn’t finish in the top-twenty a single time, with his best finish being a 22nd at Talladega Superspeedway. Benning elected to run full-time in 2021. He did not qualify at Daytona for the third year in a row. During the Spring Kansas weekend, the team's truck used for pulling the hauler was stolen from the hotel parking lot where they were staying. Benning attempted just four races in 2022 but did not qualify for any of them. Benning attempted four races in 2023 as well, but only qualified for two of them, with a best finish of 24th in the dirt race at Bristol. In 2024, his best result in his three attempts came at Talladega, where he finished 21st and on the lead lap.

2025 saw Benning make 12 starts, most notably finishing on the lead lap in 16th place at Daytona. He failed to finish any other races that year, often being parked for not meeting minimum speed.

==== Truck No. 6 results ====
Year	Driver	No.	Make	1	2	3	4	5	6	7	8	9	10	11	12	13	14	15	16	17	18	19	20	21	22	23	24	25	Owners	Pts
2014	Norm Benning	6	Chevy	DAY	MAR	KAN	CLT	DOV	TEX	GTW	KEN	IOW	ELD; 27	POC; 20	MCH; 22	BRI; 25	MSP; 22	CHI; 27	NHA; 27	LVS; 24	TAL; 20	MAR; 25	TEX; 28	PHO; 28	HOM; 34				24th	432
2015	Norm Benning	6	Chevy	DAY; 14	ATL; 31	MAR; 28	KAN; 24	CLT; 32	DOV; 26	TEX; 25	GTW; 26	IOW; 25	KEN; 31	ELD; 19	POC; 22	MCH; 27	BRI; 24	MSP; 21	CHI; 22	NHA; DNQ	LVS; 26	TAL; 21	MAR; DNQ	TEX; 27	PHO; DNQ	HOM; DNQ			27th	365
2016	Norm Benning	6	Chevy	DAY; DNQ	ATL; DNQ	MAR; DNQ	KAN; DNQ	DOV; DNQ	CLT; Wth	TEX; DNQ	IOW; Wth	GTW; Wth	KEN	ELD; DNQ					CHI; 31	NHA	LVS	TAL; Wth	MAR	TEX	PHO	HOM			48th	2
2016	Sean Corr	6	Chevy												POC; 30	BRI													48th	2
2016	Ryan Ellis	6	Chevy														MCH; 31	MSP											48th	2
2017	Norm Benning	6	Chevy	DAY; DNQ	ATL; DNQ	MAR; DNQ	KAN; 24	CLT; 26	DOV; 26	TEX; 17	GTW; 22	IOW; 22	KEN; 32	ELD; 13	POC; 21	MCH; 20	BRI; 31	MSP; 18	CHI; 23	NHA; 19	LVS; 19	TAL; 31	MAR; 27	TEX; 23	PHO; 22	HOM; 25			20th	370
2018	Norm Benning	6	Chevy	DAY; 14	ATL; 29	LVS; 26	MAR; 31	DOV; 27	KAN; 23	CLT; 31	TEX; 21	IOW; 20	GTW; 24	CHI; 31	KEN; 25	ELD; 32	POC; 25	MCH; 21	BRI; DNQ	MSP; 20	LVS; DNQ	TAL; DNQ	MAR; DNQ	TEX	PHO	HOM			27th	193
2019	Norm Benning	6	Chevy	DAY; DNQ	ATL; 29	LVS; 28	MAR; DNQ	TEX; DNQ	DOV; 32	KAN; 21	CLT; Wth	TEX; 17	IOW; 24	GTW; 25	CHI; 29	KEN; DNQ	POC; 22	ELD; 22	MCH; 32	BRI; Wth	MSP; 24	LVS	TAL; 18	MAR; 24	PHO	HOM			29th	171
2020	Norm Benning	6	Chevy	DAY; DNQ	LVS	CLT; DNQ	ATL; DNQ	HOM; 34	POC; 30	KEN; 40	TEX; 34	KAN; 36	KAN; 25	MCH; 31	DAY; 27	DOV; 35	GTW; 29	DAR; 32	RCH; 30	BRI; 34	LVS	TAL; 22	KAN; 31	TEX; 26	MAR; 26	PHO			39th	128
2021	Norm Benning	6	Chevy	DAY; DNQ	DAY; 32	LVS; 33	ATL; 40	BRI; 37	RCH; 32	KAN; 39	DAR; 37	COA; Wth	CLT	TEX; 30	NSH	POC; 32	KNX; 19	GLN; 37	GTW; Wth	DAR; 35	BRI; DNQ	LVS	TAL; 17	MAR; DNQ	PHO; DNQ				42nd	71
2022	Norm Benning	6	Chevy	DAY	LVS	ATL	COA	MAR	BRI; DNQ	DAR	KAN	TEX	CLT	GTW	SON	KNX; DNQ	NSH	MOH	POC; DNQ	IRP	RCH; DNQ	KAN	BRI	TAL	HOM	PHO			55th	0
2023	Norm Benning	6	Chevy	DAY	LVS	ATL	COA	TEX	BRD; 24	MAR	KAN	DAR	NWS; DNQ	CLT	GTW; 28	NSH	MOH; Wth	POC; DNQ	RCH	IRP	MLW	KAN	BRI	TAL	HOM	PHO			43rd	22
2024	Norm Benning	6	Chevy	DAY	ATL	LVS	BRI	COA	MAR	TEX	KAN	DAR	NWS	CLT	GTW	NSH	POC	IRP	RCH	MLW; DNQ	BRI	KAN	TAL; 21	HOM	MAR; 36	PHO			44th	17
2025	Norm Benning	6	Chevy	DAY; 16	ATL	LVS	HOM	MAR; 34	BRI; 34	CAR; 35	TEX	KAN	NWS; 34	CLT	NSH	MCH; 32	POC; 34	LRP; Wth	IRP; 31	GLN	RCH; Wth	DAR	BRI; 34	NHA; 34	ROV	TAL; 32	MAR; 33	PHO	40th	61
2026	Norm Benning	6	Chevy	DAY; DNQ	ATL	STP	DAR	ROC	BRI	TEX	GLN	DOV	CLT	NSS	MCH	COR	LRP	NWS	IRP	RCH	NHA	BRI	KAN	CLT	PHO	TAL; DNQ	MAR	HOM	47th	0

=== Truck No. 57 History ===
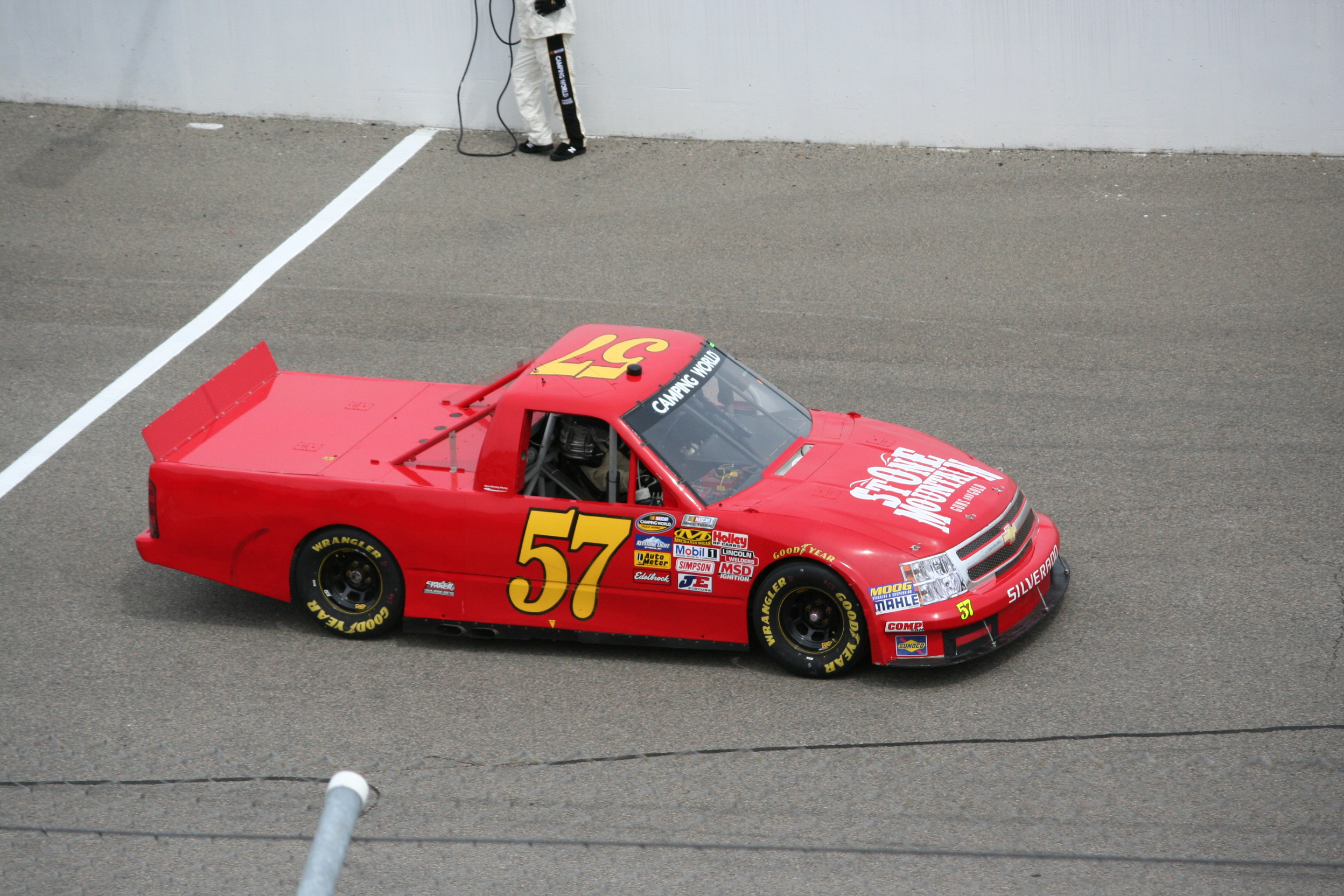
The No. 57 truck at Rockingham Speedway in 2013

Since 2008, Norm Benning Racing has fielded the No. 57 truck. Beginning in 2009, Benning ran the full schedule in the 57 despite having poor performing equipment and little to no funding. Beginning in 2011, Norm began fielding a second truck on a part-time basis to help fund the 57.

In the 2013 Mudsummer Classic, Norm Benning and his team gained media attention when he beat Clay Greenfield to qualify in the 30th position.

The 57 made its lone appearance at Gateway in 2015, parking after one lap with Joey Gattina. Steve Fox withdrew the 57 at Pocono.

After not running in 2016, the 57 returned exactly two years after its previous race at Gateway in 2017 with Tommy Regan driving. B. J. McLeod and J. J. Yeley ran the 57 before Mike Senica became the primary driver.

In 2018, Senica announced that he was to drive the 57 fielded by Benning with several different companies sponsoring the truck, however, Benning and Senica couldn't reach an agreement because Benning only wanted Senica to start and park the 57. The 57 then showed up at Martinsville with Jeff Zillweger behind the wheel. The 57 would withdraw after not showing enough speed to have a good chance of qualifying.

==== Truck No. 57 results ====
Year	Driver	No.	Make	1	2	3	4	5	6	7	8	9	10	11	12	13	14	15	16	17	18	19	20	21	22	23	24	25	Owners	Pts
2008	Norm Benning	57	Chevy	DAY	CAL	ATL	MAR	KAN	CLT	MFD	DOV	TEX	MCH	MLW	MEM	KEN	IRP	NSH; 34	BRI; DNQ	GTY	NHA; 33	LVS; 30	TAL; Wth	MAR	ATL; 31	TEX; 28	PHO; 34	HOM; 35	36th	454
2009	Norm Benning	57	Chevy	DAY; DNQ	CAL; 28	ATL; 30	MAR; 25	KAN; 31	CLT; 24	DOV; 30	TEX; 33	MCH; 17	MLW; 24	MEM; 21	KEN; 18	IRP; 23	NSH; 22	BRI; 29	CHI; 24	IOW; 27	GTY; 26	NHA; 23	LVS; 24	MAR; 25	TAL; 18	TEX; 29	PHO; 25	HOM; 29	22nd	2146
2010	Norm Benning	57	Chevy	DAY; 25	ATL; 25	MAR; 23	NSH; 31	KAN; 24	DOV; 23	CLT; 24	TEX; 17	MCH; 28	IOW; 22	GTY; 25	IRP; 22	POC; 28	NSH; 22	DAR; 18	BRI; 25	CHI; 24	KEN; 31	NHA; 26	LVS; 30	MAR; 24	TAL; 30	TEX; 26	PHO; 24	HOM; 32	24th	2188
2011	Norm Benning	57	Chevy	DAY; 36	PHO; 27	DAR; 26	MAR; 27	NSH; DNQ	DOV; 26	CLT; DNQ	KAN; 33	TEX; 35	KEN; 31	IOW; 26	NSH; 25	IRP; 31	POC; 24	MCH; 20	BRI; DNQ	ATL; DNQ	CHI; 27	NHA; 25	KEN; 21	LVS; 15	TAL; DNQ	MAR; 29	TEX; DNQ	HOM; 29	28th	323
2012	Norm Benning	57	Chevy	DAY; DNQ	MAR; DNQ	CAR; 30	KAN; 28	CLT; DNQ	DOV; 25	TEX; 22	KEN; DNQ	IOW; 24	CHI; 25	POC; 20	MCH; 23	BRI; 27	ATL; DNQ	IOW; 25	KEN; 15	LVS; 18	TAL; 15	MAR; 31	TEX; 26	PHO; 19	HOM; 29				27th	346
2013	Norm Benning	57	Chevy	DAY; 17	MAR; 33	CAR; 33	KAN; 26	CLT; DNQ	DOV; 29	TEX; 23	KEN; 25	IOW; 30	ELD; 26	POC; 28	MCH; 22	BRI; 33	MSP; 20	IOW; 28	CHI; 32	LVS; 26	TAL; 12	MAR; 29	TEX; 30	PHO; 24	HOM; 28				24th	370
2014	Norm Benning	57	Chevy	DAY; 20	MAR; 28	KAN; 18	CLT; 17	DOV; 28	TEX; 22	GTW; 22	KEN; 26	IOW; 26	ELD	POC															66th	0
2014	Adam Edwards	57	Chevy												MCH; 28	BRI	MSP	CHI; 30					TEX; 29	PHO	HOM				66th	0
2014	Ted Minor	57	Chevy																NHA; 30	LVS	TAL	MAR							66th	0
2015	Joey Gattina	57	Chevy	DAY	ATL	MAR	KAN	CLT	DOV	TEX	GTW; 32	IOW	KEN	ELD															62nd	0
2015	Steve Fox	57	Chevy												POC; Wth	MCH	BRI	MSP	CHI	NHA	LVS	TAL	MAR	TEX	PHO	HOM			62nd	0
2017	Tommy Regan	57	Chevy	DAY	ATL	MAR	KAN	CLT	DOV	TEX	GTW; 29			ELD; DNQ															39th	86
2017	J. J. Yeley	57	Chevy									IOW; 32																	39th	86
2017	B. J. McLeod	57	Chevy										KEN; 31																39th	86
2017	Mike Senica	57	Chevy												POC; 30	MCH; 27	BRI; DNQ	MSP; 30	CHI; 32	NHA; 28	LVS; 27	TAL	MAR; DNQ	TEX; 30	PHO; 32	HOM; 30			39th	86
2018	Jeff Zillweger	57	Chevy	DAY	ATL	LVS	MAR; Wth	DOV	KAN	CLT	TEX	IOW	GTW	CHI	KEN	ELD	POC	MCH	BRI	MSP	LVS	TAL	MAR	TEX	PHO	HOM			N/A	0

=== Truck No. 63 history ===
Midway through the 2016 season, Benning struck a deal with MB Motorsports to run the No. 63. Benning would run seven races in the No. 63 and one race in the No. 6, while missing twelve, and not entering one.

==== Truck No. 63 results ====
Year	Driver	No.	Make	1	2	3	4	5	6	7	8	9	10	11	12	13	14	15	16	17	18	19	20	21	22	23	Owners	Pts
2016	Norm Benning	63	Chevy	DAY	ATL	MAR	KAN	DOV	CLT	TEX	IOW	GTW	KEN; 28	ELD	POC; 23	BRI	MCH; 27	MSP; 20	CHI	NHA	LVS; 26	TAL	MAR	TEX; 32	PHO; 26	HOM; DNQ	32nd	130

=== Truck No. 71 history ===
In 2014, the team ran one race with the number 71 with Adam Edwards, as the Henderson team had the 75 entered.

==== Truck No. 71 results ====
Year	Driver	No.	Make	1	2	3	4	5	6	7	8	9	10	11	12	13	14	15	16	17	18	19	20	21	22	Owners	Pts
2014	Adam Edwards	71	Chevy	DAY	MAR	KAN	CLT	DOV	TEX	GTW	KEN; 30	IOW	ELD	POC	MCH	BRI	MSP	CHI	NHA	LVS	TAL	MAR	TEX	PHO	HOM	66th	0

=== Truck No. 75 history ===
In 2011, the team debuted the number 75, which NBR shared with Henderson Motorsports. The first race run by the team was with Mike Harmon behind the wheel. Harmon started and finished 33rd, parking the car after six laps. The truck ran sporadically throughout the season, driven by Johnny Borneman III, J. J. Yeley, Bobby Santos III, and James Hylton made his Truck Series debut at the age of 76 at Pocono. The team only ran twice in 2012, four times in 2013, and six times in 2014, although the team only ran one race as the 75.

==== Truck No. 75 results ====
Year	Driver	No.	Make	1	2	3	4	5	6	7	8	9	10	11	12	13	14	15	16	17	18	19	20	21	22	23	24	25	Owners	Pts
2011	Greg Seevers	75	Chevy	DAY	PHO	DAR	MAR	NSH	DOV	CLT	KAN	TEX	KEN	IOW; 32															71st	11
2011	Mike Harmon	75	Chevy												NSH; 33	IRP													71st	11
2011	James Hylton	75	Chevy														POC; 30												71st	11
2011	J. J. Yeley	75	Chevy															MCH; 31	BRI	ATL	CHI								71st	11
2011	Bobby Santos III	75	Chevy																			NHA; 34	KEN						71st	11
2011	Johnny Borneman III	75	Chevy																					LVS; 34	TAL	MAR	TEX	HOM	71st	11
2012	Adam Edwards	75	Chevy	DAY	MAR	CAR	KAN	CLT	DOV	TEX	KEN	IOW	CHI	POC; 33															57th	21
2012	Josh Wise	75	Chevy												MCH; 34	BRI	ATL	IOW	KEN	LVS	TAL	MAR	TEX	PHO	HOM				57th	21
2013	Clay Greenfield	75	Chevy	DAY	MAR	CAR	KAN	CLT	DOV	TEX	KEN; 29	IOW	ELD	POC															65th	0
2013	Todd Peck	75	Chevy												MCH; 31	BRI	MSP	IOW	CHI	LVS	TAL	MAR							65th	0
2013	Morgan Shepherd	75	Chevy																				TEX; 34	PHO	HOM				65th	0
2014	Adam Edwards	75	Chevy	DAY	MAR	KAN	CLT	DOV	TEX	GTW; 29	KEN	IOW	ELD	POC	MCH	BRI	MSP	CHI	NHA	LVS	TAL	MAR	TEX	PHO	HOM				66th	0

== ARCA Re/Max Series ==
=== Car No. 3 history ===
In 2001, Norm Benning Racing fielded the No. 3 for Todd Antrican for the later half of the season.

==== Car No. 3 results ====
Year	Driver	No.	Make	1	2	3	4	5	6	7	8	9	10	11	12	13	14	15	16	17	18	19	20	21	22	23	24	25	Owners	Pts
2001	Todd Antrican	3	Chevy	DAY	NSH	WIN	SLM	GTY	KEN	CLT	KAN	MCH	POC	MEM	GLN	KEN	MCH	POC	NSH	ISF	CHI; 37	DSF; 37	SLM; 31	TOL; 25	BLN; 28	CLT	TAL; DNQ	ATL; 38		

=== Car No. 4 history ===
In 2001, Norm Benning drove the No. 4 at Kentucky while Todd Antrican drove the No. 84.

==== Car No. 4 results ====
Year	Driver	No.	Make	1	2	3	4	5	6	7	8	9	10	11	12	13	14	15	16	17	18	19	20	21	22	23	24	25	Owners	Pts
2001	Norm Benning	4	Chevy	DAY	NSH	WIN	SLM	GTY	KEN; 26	CLT	KAN	MCH	POC	MEM	GLN	KEN	MCH	POC	NSH	ISF	CHI	DSF	SLM	TOL	BLN	CLT	TAL	ATL		

=== Car No. 7 history ===
In 2004, Norm Benning drove the No. 7 at Toledo while Clair Zimmerman drove the No. 84.

==== Car No. 7 results ====
Year	Driver	No.	Make	1	2	3	4	5	6	7	8	9	10	11	12	13	14	15	16	17	18	19	20	21	22	Owners	Pts
2004	Norm Benning	7	Chevy	DAY	NSH	SLM	KEN	TOL	CLT	KAN	POC	MCH	SBO	BLN	KEN	GTW	POC	LER	NSH	ISF	TOL; 9	DSF	CHI	SLM	TAL		

=== Car No. 8 history ===
In 2001, Norm Benning fielded the No. 8 part-time for Greg Sarff and Todd Antrican.

In 2002, the No. 8 run full-time as start and park entry with multiple drivers such Antrican, Tim Mitchell, Randy Ainsworth, Doug Ehret, Craig Bracken, Jerry Middleton, and James Hylton.

In 2003, the No. 8 run part-time with multiple drivers such as Mitchell, Doug Keller, Antrican, Boomer Stevens, Jim Walker, Tim Turner, Hylton, Bill Paskiewicz, and Tim Burrell.

In 2004, the No. 8 run part-time with multiple drivers such as Antrican, Mario Gosselin, Frank Bigler, Mike Koch, Mike Zazula, Greg Seevers, and Turner.

In 2005, the No. 8 run part-time with multiple drivers such as Bill Eversole, Jim Walker, Koch, John O'Neal Jr., Jim Locke, Wayne Peterson, and Seevers.

In 2006, the No. 8 run part-time with multiple drivers such as Tony Ackerland, Larry Hollenbeck, Seevers, Butch Jarvis, Zazula, and Drew White.

In 2007, the No. 8 run part-time with Seevers and Adam Edwards as the driver.

In 2008, Barry Layne, Jeremy Petty, Greg Seevers, Zazula, and Brad Yunker drove the No. 8 part-time.

In 2009, Seevers and Benning drove the No. 8 part-time.

==== Car No. 8 results ====
Year	Driver	No.	Make	1	2	3	4	5	6	7	8	9	10	11	12	13	14	15	16	17	18	19	20	21	22	23	24	25	Owners	Pts
2001	Greg Sarff	8	Ford	DAY	NSH	WIN	SLM	GTY	KEN	CLT	KAN	MCH	POC; 37	MEM	GLN	KEN	MCH	POC	NSH	ISF	CHI	DSF	SLM	TOL	BLN					
2001	Todd Antrican	8	Chevy																							CLT; 29	TAL	ATL		
2002	Todd Antrican	8	Chevy	DAY; DNQ	ATL; DNQ	NSH; 35		KEN; 39	CLT; 41			MCH; 37	TOL; DNQ						ISF; 36		DSF; 35	CHI								
2002	Tim Mitchell	8	Chevy				SLM; 33																							
2002	Randy Ainsworth	8	Chevy							KAN; 32				SBO; 27	KEN; DNQ		POC; 41	NSH; 37												
2002	Doug Ehret	8	Chevy								POC; 33																			
2002	Craig Bracken	8	Chevy													BLN; 33														
2002	Jerry Middleton	8	Chevy																	WIN; 33				TAL; DNQ	CLT; 41					
2002	James Hylton	8	Chevy																				SLM; DNQ							
2003	Tim Mitchell	8	Chevy	DAY	ATL	NSH	SLM; DNQ	TOL	KEN	CLT	BLN						NSH; 40													
2003	Doug Keller	8	Chevy									KAN; 38																		
2003	Todd Antrican	8	Chevy										MCH; DNQ		POC; 35	POC; DNQ														
2003	Boomer Stevens	8	Chevy											LER; 34					WIN; DNQ			SLM; 33								
2003	Jim Walker	8	Chevy															ISF; 32												
2003	Tim Turner	8	Chevy																	DSF; 36										
2003	James Hylton	8	Chevy																		CHI; 37									
2003	Bill Paskiewicz	8	Chevy																				TAL; DNQ	CLT						
2003	Tim Burrell	8	Ford																						SBO; DNQ					
2004	Todd Antrican	8	Chevy	DAY	NSH	SLM; 30	KEN; 33	TOL; 31							KEN; 37					ISF; 33	TOL; DNQ	DSF; 36	CHI	SLM	TAL; DNQ					
2004	Mario Gosselin	8	Chevy						CLT; 36																					
2004	Frank Bigler	8	Chevy							KAN; DNQ																				
2004	Mike Koch	8	Chevy								POC; 37	MCH				GTW; 34	POC; 35		NSH; 41											
2004	Mike Zazula	8	Chevy										SBO; 29																	
2004	Greg Seevers	8	Chevy											BLN; 30																
2004	Tim Turner	8	Chevy															LER; 32												
2005	Bill Eversole	8	Dodge	DAY; 35	NSH	SLM	KEN	TOL																						
2005	Jim Walker	8	Chevy						LAN; DNQ																					
2005	Mike Koch	8	Chevy							MIL; 40	POC; 39	MCH																		
2005	John O'Neal, Jr.	8	Pontiac										KAN; 35	KEN																
2005	Jim Locke	8	Chevy												BLN; DNQ	POC; 38		LER; DNQ	NSH; DNQ	MCH; DNQ	ISF; 34	TOL; DNQ		CHI; DNQ	SLM; DNQ	TAL; DNQ				
2005	Wayne Peterson	8	Chevy														GTW; 40													
2005	Greg Seevers	8	Chevy																				DSF; 37							
2006	Tony Ackerland	8	Chevy	DAY; DNQ																										
2006	Larry Hollenbeck	8	Chevy		NSH; DNQ																									
2006	Greg Seevers	8	Chevy			SLM; DNQ	WIN; DNQ	KEN	TOL; DNQ		MCH; DNQ	KAN; DNQ	KEN	BLN; DNQ		GTW; DNQ			ISF; 35		TOL; DNQ	DSF; 36	CHI	SLM; DNQ	TAL	IOW				
2006	Butch Jarvis	8	Chevy							POC; DNQ							NSH; DNQ	MCH												
2006	Mike Zazula	8	Chevy												POC; 39															
2006	Drew White	8	Chevy																	MIL; DNQ										
2007	Greg Seevers	8	Chevy	DAY	USA	NSH; DNQ	SLM; DNQ	KAN	WIN; DNQ	KEN; DNQ	TOL; DNQ	IOW; 37			BLN; 33	KEN	POC; DNQ	NSH	ISF; 39	MIL	GTW; 40	DSF; 39	CHI	SLM	TAL	TOL; DNQ				
2007	Adam Edwards	8	Chevy										POC; 41	MCH																
2008	Barry Layne	8	Chevy	DAY	SLM	IOW; 40																								
2008	Jeremy Petty	8	Chevy				KAN; DNQ	CAR																						
2008	Greg Seevers	8	Chevy						KEN; 41	TOL; DNQ				KEN; DNQ	BLN; 31		NSH; 39	ISF; 36	DSF; 39	CHI; DNQ	SLM			TOL; DNQ						
2008	Mike Zazula	8	Chevy								POC; 36	MCH				POC; 31						NJE; DNQ	TAL							
2008	Brad Yunker	8	Chevy										BLN; 32																	
2009	Greg Seevers	8	Chevy	DAY	SLM; 29	CAR	TAL	KEN; 35	TOL	POC	MCH	MFD		KEN; 35	BLN	POC	ISF	CHI	TOL	DSF	NJE	SLM	KAN	CAR						
2009	Norm Benning	8	Chevy										IOW; 35																	

=== Car No. 64 history ===
In 1997, Benning drove the No. 64 at Winchester to 18th place finish.

In 2001, Todd Antrican would make his debut in the ARCA Re/Max Series at Salem Speedway, driving the No. 64 Chevrolet, where he would finish 26th after ten laps due to handling issues.

In 2009, Antrican attempted to drive the No. 64 Chevrolet at Rockingham Speedway, where he would ultimately fail to qualify.

==== Car No. 64 results ====
Year	Driver	No.	Make	1	2	3	4	5	6	7	8	9	10	11	12	13	14	15	16	17	18	19	20	21	22	23	24	25	Owners	Pts
1997	Norm Benning	64	Chevy	DAY	ATL	SLM	CLT	CLT	POC	MCH	SBS	TOL	KIL	FRS	MIN	POC	MCH	DSF	GTW	SLM	WIN; 18	CLT	TAL	ISF	ATL					
2001	Todd Antrican	64	Chevy	DAY	NSH; DNQ	WIN; DNQ	SLM; 26	GTY	KEN	CLT	KAN; 30	MCH; 34	POC; 32	MEM; 28	GLN	KEN; 30	MCH; 30	POC; 34	NSH; 31	ISF; 32	CHI	DSF	SLM	TOL	BLN	CLT	TAL	ATL		
2009	Todd Antrican	64	Chevy	DAY	SLM	CAR; DNQ	TAL	KEN	TOL	POC	MCH	MFD	IOW	KEN	BLN	POC	ISF	CHI	TOL	DSF	NJE	SLM	KAN	CAR						

=== Car No. 81 history ===
In 2005, Norm Benning Racing fielded the No. 81 for Todd Antrican and Tony Ackerland.

In 2007, Greg Seevers drove the No. 81 at Milwaukee Mile.

In 2008, Scott Alves and Seevers dorve the No. 81 part-time.

==== Car No. 81 results ====
Year	Driver	No.	Make	1	2	3	4	5	6	7	8	9	10	11	12	13	14	15	16	17	18	19	20	21	22	23	Owners	Pts
2005	Todd Antrican	81	Chevy	DAY	NSH; DNQ	SLM	KEN	TOL	LAN	MIL	POC	MCH																
2005	Tony Ackerland	81	Chevy										KAN; 38	KEN	BLN	POC	GTW	LER	NSH	MCH	ISF	TOL	DSF	CHI	SLM	TAL		
2007	Greg Seevers	81	Chevy	DAY	USA	NSH	SLM	KAN	WIN	KEN	TOL	IOW	POC	MCH	BLN	KEN	POC	NSH	ISF	MIL; 38	GTW	DSF	CHI	SLM	TAL	TOL		
2008	Scott Alves	81	Chevy	DAY	SLM	IOW	KAN	CAR; DNQ	KEN	TOL	POC																	
2008	Greg Seevers	81	Chevy									MCH; 40	CAY	KEN	BLN	POC	NSH	ISF	DSF	CHI	SLM	NJE	TAL	TOL				

=== Car No. 84 history ===
Norm Benning Racing began fielding the No. 84 in the ARCA Racing Series in 1995 at Atlanta Motor Speedway with Benning behind the wheel. He finished 24th after engine trouble.

In 1996, Benning scored two top-tens at both Pocono races.

In 1997, Benning started to drive the No. 84 full-time. He failed to qualify for the season opener at Daytona.

In 1998, Benning scored two top-tens at Memphis and Springfield.

In 1999, Benning scored another two top-tens at Springfield and DuQuoin.

In 2000, Benning scored career best six top-tens.

In 2001, Benning drove the No. 84 for the majority of the schedule while Todd Antrican drove the car at Kentucky and Watkins Glen.

In 2002, Benning returned to drive the No. 84 full-time. He scored three top-tens.

In 2003, Benning scored three top-tens and two top-fives.

In 2004, Benning drove the No. 84 for the majority of the schedule while Clair Zimmerman drove the car at Toledo. This season Benning scored his best finish of third at Springfield.

From 2005 until 2007, Benning continued to drive the No. 84 full-time.

In 2008, Benning drove the No. 84 for the majority of the schedule while Greg Seevers drove the car at Salem.

In 2009, Benning only drove the No. 84 car for four races while Antrican drove the rest of the schedule. Benning shut down the ARCA program at the end of the season.

==== Car No. 84 results ====
Year	Driver	No.	Make	1	2	3	4	5	6	7	8	9	10	11	12	13	14	15	16	17	18	19	20	21	22	23	24	25	Owners	Pts
1995	Norm Benning	84	Chevy	DAY	ATL	TAL	FIF	KIL	FRS	MCH	I80	MCS	FRS	POC	POC	KIL	FRS	SBS	LVL	ISF	DSF	SLM	WIN	ATL; 24						
1996	Norm Benning	84	Chevy	DAY; DNQ	ATL; 34	SLM	TAL	FIF	LVL	CLT; 15	CLT; 19	KIL	FRS	POC; 8	MCH; 20	FRS	TOL	POC; 8	MCH; 18	INF	SBS	ISF	DSF	KIL	SLM; 29	WIN; 25	CLT; 38	ATL; 28		
1997	Norm Benning	84	Chevy	DAY; DNQ	ATL; 24	SLM; 31	CLT; 35	CLT; 22	POC; 26	MCH; 36	SBS; 21	TOL; 21	KIL; 19	FRS; 22	MIN; 13	POC; 33	MCH; 22	DSF; 19	GTW; 24	SLM; 19	WIN	CLT; 19	TAL; 15	ISF; 34	ATL; 36					
1998	Norm Benning	84	Chevy	DAY; 29	ATL; 12	SLM; 14	CLT; 29	MEM; 8	MCH; 39	POC; 32	SBS; 15	TOL; 19	PPR; 24	POC; 36	KIL; 20	FRS; 16	ISF; 7	ATL; 21	DSF; 12	SLM; 16	TEX; 13	WIN; 14	CLT; 38	TAL; 23	ATL; 32					
1999	Norm Benning	84	Chevy	DAY; 30	ATL; 15	SLM; 23	AND; 12	CLT; 27	MCH; 22	POC; 18	TOL; 23	SBS; 17	BLN; 19	POC; 15	KIL; 15	FRS; 16	FLM; 16	ISF; 6	WIN; 11	DSF; 10	SLM; 28	CLT; 26	TAL; 23	ATL; 20						
2000	Norm Benning	84	Chevy	DAY; 23	SLM; 6	AND; 8	CLT; 25	KIL; 8	FRS; 17	MCH; 15	POC; 20	TOL; 19	KEN; 14	BLN; 25	POC; 11	WIN; 22	ISF; 10	KEN; 15	DSF; 7	SLM; 23	CLT; 24	TAL; 9	ATL; 32							
2001	Norm Benning	84	Chevy	DAY; 30	NSH; 21	WIN; 14	SLM; 17	GTW; 18		CLT; 14	KAN; 12	MCH; 22	POC; 23	MEM; 11		KEN; 11	MCH; 20	POC; 18	NSH; 10	ISF; 26	CHI; 15	DSF; 30	SLM; 14	TOL; 9	BLN; 13	CLT; 16	TAL; 31	ATL; 19		
2001	Todd Antrican	84	Chevy						KEN; 39						GLN; 31															
2002	Norm Benning	84	Chevy	DAY; 33	ATL; 25	NSH; 18	SLM; 10	KEN; 14	CLT; 22	KAN; 14	POC; 14	MCH; 23	TOL; 12	SBO; 20	KEN; 22	BLN; 19	POC; 30	NSH; 20	ISF; 6	WIN; 9	DSF; 21	CHI; 16	SLM; 21	TAL; 21	CLT; 26					
2003	Norm Benning	84	Chevy	DAY; 21	ATL; 40	NSH; 22	SLM; 8	TOL; 26	KEN; 27	CLT; 26	BLN; 21	KAN; 31	MCH; 24	LER; 16	POC; 31	POC; 40	NSH; 25	ISF; 5	WIN; 14	DSF; 4	CHI; 21	SLM; 8	TAL; 18	CLT; 28	SBO; 8					
2004	Norm Benning	84	Chevy	DAY; 31	NSH; 31	SLM; 18	KEN; 24	TOL; 8	CLT; 33	KAN; 17	POC; 17	MCH; 21	SBO; 4	BLN; 11	KEN; 28	GTW; 14	POC; 16	LER; 11	NSH; 22	ISF; 3		DSF; 7	CHI; 19	SLM; 4	TAL; 25					
2004	Clair Zimmerman	84	Chevy																		TOL; 17									
2005	Norm Benning	84	Chevy	DAY; 10	NSH; 19	SLM; 19	KEN; 33	TOL; 13	LAN; 22	MIL; 35	POC; 13	MCH; 23	KAN; 19	KEN; 30	BLN; 18	POC; 24	GTW; 28	LER; 25	NSH; 31	MCH; 22	ISF; 13	TOL; 19	DSF; 23	CHI; 19	SLM; 20	TAL; 20				
2006	Norm Benning	84	Chevy	DAY; 21	NSH; 30	SLM; 15	WIN; 14	KEN; 26	TOL; 23	POC; 35	MCH; 30	KAN; 17	KEN; 19	BLN; 20	POC; 29	GTW; 19	NSH; 17	MCH; 25	ISF; 7	MIL; 22	TOL; 17	DSF; 14	CHI; 19	SLM; 14	TAL; 27	IOW; 19				
2007	Norm Benning	84	Chevy	DAY; 24	USA; 23	NSH; 29	SLM; 15	KAN; 29	WIN; 13	KEN; 25	TOL; 13	IOW; 23	POC; 22	MCH; 26	BLN; 18	KEN; 30	POC; 19	NSH; 22	ISF; 17	MIL; 14	GTW; 23	DSF; 34	CHI; 18	SLM; 20	TAL; 40	TOL; 23				
2008	Norm Benning	84	Chevy	DAY; 31	SLM; 10	IOW; 21	KAN; 26	CAR; 26	KEN; 24	TOL; 22	POC; 17	MCH; 39	CAY; 13	KEN; 24	BLN; 21	POC; 31	NSH; 23	ISF; 27	DSF; 20	CHI; 25		NJE; 33	TAL; 18	TOL; 17						
2008	Greg Seevers	84	Chevy																		SLM; 29									
2009	Norm Benning	84	Chevy	DAY; 10	SLM; 14	CAR; 32																		CAR; 35						
2009	Todd Antrican	84	Chevy				TAL; 37	KEN; 33	TOL; 32	POC; 32	MCH; 37	MFD; 28	IOW; 33	KEN; 34	BLN; 31	POC; 33	ISF; 35	CHI; 33	TOL; 23	DSF; 24	NJE; 31	SLM; 25	KAN; 36							

=== Car No. 91 history ===
In 2001, Norm Benning Racing fielded the No. 91 for Todd Antrican at Gateway.

==== Car No. 91 results ====
Year	Driver	No.	Make	1	2	3	4	5	6	7	8	9	10	11	12	13	14	15	16	17	18	19	20	21	22	23	24	25	Owners	Pts
2001	Todd Antrican	91	Chevy	DAY	NSH	WIN	SLM	GTY; 34	KEN	CLT	KAN	MCH	POC	MEM	GLN	KEN	MCH	POC	NSH	ISF	CHI	DSF	SLM	TOL	BLN	CLT	TAL	ATL		
