= Tim Turner (racing driver) =

American racing driver

- Born: January 27, 1969 (age 57); Pulaski, Tennessee, U.S.

ARCA Menards Series career
- 47 races run over 8 years
- Best finish: 18th (2004)
- First race: 2001 ARCA Re/Max 250 (Winchester)
- Last race: 2012 Ansell ActivArmr 150 (Chicagoland)
Wins	Top tens	Poles
0	0	0
- Statistics up to date as of May 3, 2024.

Tim Turner (born January 27, 1969) is an American former professional stock car racing driver who has previously competed in the ARCA Racing Series, primarily driving for K&K Racing.

== Racing career ==
In 2001, Turner made his debut in the ARCA Re/Max Series at Winchester Speedway, driving the No. 6 Chevrolet for Wayne Peterson Racing, where he finished in fifteenth after starting in 25th. He then made four more starts for Peterson that year, getting a best finish of twelfth at Salem Speedway. He ran eight more races for Peterson the following year, where he had a best finish of 30th in his first race of the year at Atlanta Motor Speedway. In 2003, Turner ran three more races for Peterson, getting a best finish of 24th at Atlanta before driving for Norm Benning Racing at the DuQuoin State Fairgrounds dirt track, where he finished in 36th due to engine issues, and for DMW Motorsports at Lowe's Motor Speedway, where he failed to qualify.

In 2004, Turner joined K&K Racing in the No. 79 for a majority of the races held that year, including one start for Benning at Lake Erie Speedway, and another for DGM Racing at Charlotte. Across the year, he failed to qualify for eight races, got a best finish of sixteenth in his first start at Salem, and finished eighteenth in the final points standings. He then solely drove for K&K Racing for the following year in 2005, this time running the full schedule, where he finished nineteenth in the points with a best finish of seventeenth at Pocono Raceway. However, he failed to qualify for ten races, including the first five races of the season. In 2006, Turner only attempted one race at Pocono, this time driving the No. 87 Chevrolet, where he ultimately failed to qualify. He then ran the No. 21 Pontiac at Pocono, where he finished 36th due to overheating issues, and then ran the No. 7 Chevrolet for Bobby Gerhart Racing at the Illinois State Fairgrounds dirt track, where he once again finished 36th, this time due to handling issues.

After not racing in the series from 2008 to 2011, during which time he served as a spotter for K&K Racing, Turner returned at Chicagoland Speedway in 2012, this time driving the No. 3 Chevrolet for K&K, where he started and finished 30th after running only five laps due to handling issues. He has not competed in the series since then.

== Motorsports results ==
=== ARCA Racing Series ===
(key) (Bold – Pole position awarded by qualifying time. Italics – Pole position earned by points standings or practice time. * – Most laps led.)

ARCA Racing Series results
Year	Team	No.	Make	1	2	3	4	5	6	7	8	9	10	11	12	13	14	15	16	17	18	19	20	21	22	23	24	25	ARSC	Pts	Ref
2001	Wayne Peterson Racing	6	Chevy	DAY	NSH	WIN; 15																							58th	615	
2001	Wayne Peterson Racing	6	Pontiac				SLM; 12	GTY; 19	KEN	CLT	KAN	MCH	POC	MEM	GLN	KEN	MCH	POC	NSH										58th	615	
2001	Wayne Peterson Racing	18	Chevy																	ISF; 31	CHI				BLN; DNQ	CLT	TAL	ATL	58th	615	
2001	Wayne Peterson Racing	18	Pontiac																			DSF; 35	SLM	TOL					58th	615	
2002	Wayne Peterson Racing	6	Pontiac	DAY	ATL; 30																								59th	495	
2002	Wayne Peterson Racing	4	Chevy			NSH; 39																							59th	495	
2002	Wayne Peterson Racing	6	Chevy				SLM; 32																		CLT; 39				59th	495	
2002	Wayne Peterson Racing	06	Chevy					KEN; DNQ	CLT	KAN; 35	POC	MCH	TOL	SBO	KEN	BLN	POC	NSH; 35	ISF; 40	WIN; DNQ									59th	495	
2002	Wayne Peterson Racing	06	Pontiac																		DSF; 39	CHI	SLM; 35	TAL					59th	495	
2003	Wayne Peterson Racing	06	Pontiac	DAY; 38																									92nd	285	
2003	Wayne Peterson Racing	06	Chevy		ATL; 24																								92nd	285	
2003	Wayne Peterson Racing	4	Chevy			NSH; DNQ	SLM	TOL	KEN																				92nd	285	
2003	Wayne Peterson Racing	27	Chevy							CLT; 39	BLN	KAN	MCH	LER	POC	POC	NSH	ISF	WIN										92nd	285	
2003	Norm Benning Racing	8	Chevy																	DSF; 36	CHI	SLM	TAL						92nd	285	
2003	DMW Motorsports	13	Pontiac																					CLT; DNQ	SBO				92nd	285	
2004	K&K Racing	79	Chevy	DAY; DNQ															NSH; 25										18th	2630	
2004	K&K Racing	79	Pontiac		NSH; DNQ	SLM; 16	KEN; 25	TOL; 22		KAN; 23	POC; 36	MCH; DNQ	SBO; 17	BLN; 18	KEN; 33	GTW; 20	POC; 38			ISF; 18	TOL	DSF; 30	CHI; DNQ	SLM; DNQ	TAL; DNQ				18th	2630	
2004	DGM Racing	12	Chevy						CLT; DNQ																				18th	2630	
2004	Norm Benning Racing	8	Chevy															LER; 32											18th	2630	
2005	K&K Racing	79	Pontiac	DAY; DNQ	NSH; DNQ	SLM; DNQ	KEN; DNQ	TOL; DNQ	LAN; 23	MIL; 27	POC; 17																		19th	2805	
2005	K&K Racing	79	Chevy									MCH; 24	KAN; 23	KEN; 28	BLN; DNQ	POC; 20	GTW; 31	LER; 22	NSH; 24	MCH; DNQ	ISF; DNQ	TOL; 33	DSF; 31	CHI; DNQ	SLM; DNQ	TAL; 34			19th	2805	
2006	K&K Racing	87	Chevy	DAY	NSH	SLM	WIN	KEN	TOL	POC; DNQ	MCH	KAN	KEN	BLN	POC	GTW	NSH	MCH	ISF	MIL	TOL	DSF	CHI	SLM	TAL	IOW			N/A	0	
2007	K&K Racing	21	Pontiac	DAY	USA	NSH	SLM	KAN	WIN	KEN	TOL	IOW	POC	MCH	BLN	KEN	POC; 36	NSH											149th	100	
2007	Bobby Gerhart Racing	7	Chevy																ISF; 36	MIL	GTW	DSF	CHI	SLM	TAL	TOL			149th	100	
2012	K&K Racing	3	Chevy	DAY	MOB	SLM	TAL	TOL	ELK	POC	MCH	WIN	NJE	IOW	CHI; 30	IRP	POC	BLN	ISF	MAD	SLM	DSF	KAN						138th	80	
