= Todd Antrican =

American racing driver

- Born: March 22, 1965 (age 61); Miamisburg, Ohio, U.S.

ARCA Menards Series career
- 49 races run over 6 years
- Best finish: 19th (2001), (2009)
- First race: 2001 Kentuckiana Ford Dealers 200 (Salem)
- Last race: 2009 Kansas Lottery 150 (Kansas)
Wins	Top tens	Poles
0	0	0
- Statistics up to date as of July 4, 2023.

Todd Antrican (born March 22, 1965) is an American former professional stock car racing driver who has previously competed in the ARCA Racing Series, primarily driving for Norm Benning Racing.

== Racing career ==
In 2001, Antrican would make his debut in the ARCA Re/Max Series at Salem Speedway, driving the No. 64 Chevrolet for Norm Benning Racing, where he would finish 26th after ten laps due to handling issues. He would then spend the remainder of the year driving various entries for the team, finishing out the year in the No. 3 entry on his way to finish 19th in the final points standings despite finishing only one race throughout the course of the year. He were then a select number of races the following year, this time solely driving the No. 8 Chevrolet, where he would run six races and would get a best finish of 35th at both Nashville Superspeedway and the DuQuoin State Fairgrounds dirt-track. he would attempt three races the following year, including the double-header weekend at Pocono Raceway, where he would finish 35th after three laps due to a vibration in the first race and would fail to qualify for the second race. In 2004, he would run six races, and would get a best finish of 30th at Salem. For the following year, he would attempt only one race that year, with the race being at Nashville, where he would ultimately fail to qualify.

After not entering an ARCA races from 2006 to 2008, Antrican would attempt a return in 2009, driving the No. 64 Chevrolet at Rockingham Speedway, where he would ultimately fail to qualify. He would then race in the No. 84 for all but one of the remaining races of the schedule after owner Norm Benning ran the first three races of the schedule in the entry. He would get a best finish of 23rd at Toledo in September. His last race in the car would come at the second-to-last race of the season at Kansas Speedway, where he would finish 36th after thirty laps due to rear end issues. Benning would then take over the No. 84 for the following race at Rockingham, while Antrican would go on to finish 19th in the final points standings. The Kansas race would be his most recent event as a driver, as he has not competed in the series since then.

== Motorsports results ==
=== ARCA Re/Max Series ===
(key) (Bold – Pole position awarded by qualifying time. Italics – Pole position earned by points standings or practice time. * – Most laps led.)

ARCA Re/Max Series results
Year	Team	No.	Make	1	2	3	4	5	6	7	8	9	10	11	12	13	14	15	16	17	18	19	20	21	22	23	24	25	ARMC	Pts	Ref
2001	Norm Benning Racing	64	Chevy	DAY	NSH; DNQ	WIN; DNQ	SLM; 26				KAN; 30	MCH; 34	POC; 32	MEM; 28		KEN; 30	MCH; 30	POC; 34	NSH; 31	ISF; 32									19th	2195	
2001	Norm Benning Racing	91	Chevy					GTY; 34																					19th	2195	
2001	Norm Benning Racing	84	Chevy						KEN; 39	CLT					GLN; 31														19th	2195	
2001	Norm Benning Racing	3	Chevy																		CHI; 37	DSF; 37	SLM; 31	TOL; 25	BLN; 28		TAL; DNQ	ATL; 38	19th	2195	
2001	Norm Benning Racing	8	Chevy																							CLT; 29			19th	2195	
2002	Norm Benning Racing	8	Chevy	DAY; DNQ	ATL; DNQ	NSH; 35	SLM	KEN; 39	CLT; 41	KAN	POC	MCH; 37	TOL; DNQ	SBO	KEN	BLN	POC	NSH	ISF; 36	WIN	DSF; 35	CHI	SLM	TAL	CLT				98th	265	
2003	Norm Benning Racing	8	Chevy	DAY	ATL	NSH	SLM	TOL	KEN	CLT	BLN	KAN	MCH; DNQ	LER	POC; 35	POC; DNQ	NSH	ISF	WIN	DSF	CHI	SLM	TAL	CLT	SBO				160th	105	
2004	Norm Benning Racing	8	Chevy	DAY	NSH	SLM; 30	KEN; 33	TOL; 31	CLT	KAN	POC	MCH	SBO	BLN	KEN; 37	GTW	POC	LER	NSH	ISF; 33	TOL; DNQ	DSF; 36	CHI	SLM	TAL; DNQ				42nd	705	
2005	Norm Benning Racing	81	Chevy	DAY	NSH; DNQ	SLM	KEN	TOL	LAN	MIL	POC	MCH	KAN	KEN	BLN	POC	GTW	LER	NSH	MCH	ISF	TOL	DSF	CHI	SLM	TAL			N/A	0	
2009	Norm Benning Racing	64	Chevy	DAY	SLM	CAR; DNQ																							19th	2000	
2009	Norm Benning Racing	84	Chevy				TAL; 37	KEN; 33	TOL; 32	POC; 32	MCH; 37	MFD; 28	IOW; 33	KEN; 34	BLN; 31	POC; 33	ISF; 35	CHI; 33	TOL; 23	DSF; 24	NJE; 31	SLM; 25	KAN; 36	CAR					19th	2000	
