= Greg Seevers =

American racing driver

- Born: Gregory Seevers; September 7, 1965 (age 61); West Milton, Ohio, U.S.

NASCAR FedEx Freight Truck Series career
- 1 race run over 1 year
- 2011 position: NA
- First race: 2011 Coca-Cola 200 (Iowa)
Wins	Top tens	Poles
0	0	0

Gregory Seevers (born September 7, 1965) is an American professional stock car racing driver. During his career, he was a longtime start and park driver for Norm Benning's ARCA Racing Series team until he closed it in 2009 when he moved full-time to the NASCAR Camping World Truck Series that year. He would then start and park in one Truck Series race for Benning in 2011, which was the last time he raced.

== Motorsports career results ==
=== NASCAR ===
(key) (Bold – Pole position awarded by qualifying time. Italics – Pole position earned by points standings or practice time. * – Most laps led.)

==== Camping World Truck Series ====
NASCAR Camping World Truck Series results
Year	Team	No.	Make	1	2	3	4	5	6	7	8	9	10	11	12	13	14	15	16	17	18	19	20	21	22	23	24	25	NCWTC	Pts	Ref
2011	Norm Benning Racing	75	Chevy	DAY	PHO	DAR	MAR	NSH	DOV	CLT	KAN	TEX	KEN	IOW; 32	NSH	IRP	POC	MCH	BRI	ATL	CHI	NHA	KEN	LVS	TAL	MAR	TEX	HOM	106th	0	

=== ARCA Re/Max Series ===
(key) (Bold – Pole position awarded by qualifying time. Italics – Pole position earned by points standings or practice time. * – Most laps led.)

ARCA Re/Max Series results
Year	Team	No.	Make	1	2	3	4	5	6	7	8	9	10	11	12	13	14	15	16	17	18	19	20	21	22	23	ARSC	Pts	Ref
2004	Norm Benning Racing	8	Chevy	DAY	NSH	SLM	KEN	TOL	CLT	KAN	POC	MCH	SBO	BLN; 30	KEN	GTW	POC	LER	NSH	ISF	TOL	DSF	CHI	SLM	TAL		166th	80	
2005	Norm Benning Racing	8	Chevy	DAY	NSH	SLM	KEN	TOL	LAN	MIL	POC	MCH	KAN	KEN	BLN	POC	GTW	LER	NSH	MCH	ISF	TOL	DSF; 37	CHI	SLM	TAL	171st	45	
2006	Norm Benning Racing	8	Chevy	DAY	NSH	SLM; DNQ	WIN; DNQ	KEN	TOL; DNQ	POC	MCH; DNQ	KAN; DNQ	KEN	BLN; DNQ	POC	GTW; DNQ	NSH	MCH	ISF; 35	MIL	TOL; DNQ	DSF; 36	CHI	SLM; DNQ	TAL	IOW	88th	305	
2007	Norm Benning Racing	8	Chevy	DAY	USA	NSH; DNQ	SLM; DNQ	KAN	WIN; DNQ	KEN; DNQ	TOL; DNQ	IOW; 37	POC	MCH	BLN; 33	KEN	POC; DNQ	NSH	ISF; 39		GTW; 40	DSF; 39	CHI	SLM	TAL	TOL; DNQ	65th	400	
2007	Norm Benning Racing	81	Chevy																	MIL; 38							65th	400	
2008	Norm Benning Racing	8	Chevy	DAY	SLM	IOW	KAN	CAR	KEN; 41	TOL; DNQ	POC			KEN; DNQ	BLN; 31	POC	NSH; 39	ISF; 36	DSF; 39	CHI; DNQ				TOL; DNQ			44th	690	
2008	Norm Benning Racing	81	Chevy									MCH; 40	CAY														44th	690	
2008	Norm Benning Racing	84	Chevy																		SLM; 29	NJE	TAL				44th	690	
2009	Norm Benning Racing	8	Chevy	DAY	SLM; 29	CAR	TAL	KEN; 35	TOL	POC	MCH	MFD	IOW	KEN; 35	BLN	POC	ISF	CHI	TOL	DSF	NJE	SLM	KAN	CAR			113th	195	
