= Beau Slocumb =

American racing driver (1984–2011)

- Born: Burke Lowe Slocumb IV; December 26, 1984; Macon, Georgia, U.S.
- Died: April 8, 2011 (aged 26)

ARCA Menards Series career
- 4 races run over 1 year
- Best finish: 43rd (2009)
- First race: 2009 Ansell Cut Protection 150 (Chicagoland)
- Last race: 2009 Kansas Lottery 150 (Kansas)
| Wins | Top tens | Poles |
|---|---|---|
| 0 | 2 | 0 |
- Statistics up to date as of January 27, 2025.

Burke Lowe Slocumb IV (born December 26, 1984 – April 8, 2011) was an American professional stock car racing driver who competed in the ARCA Re/Max Series for four races in 2009, getting a best finish of fifth at Kansas Speedway.

Slocumb died on April 8, 2011, having previously been diagnosed with a rare form of cancer in 2009.

Slocumb also competed in the X-1R Pro Cup Series, the ASA Southeast Asphalt Tour, the ASA Late Model Series, the Georgia Asphalt Series, and the Viper Pro Late Model Series.

== Motorsports career results ==
=== ARCA Re/Max Series ===
(key) (Bold – Pole position awarded by qualifying time. Italics – Pole position earned by points standings or practice time. * – Most laps led.)

ARCA Re/Max Series results
| Year | Team | No. | Make | 1 | 2 | 3 | 4 | 5 | 6 | 7 | 8 | 9 | 10 | 11 | 12 | 13 | 14 | 15 | 16 | 17 | 18 | 19 | 20 | 21 | ARSC | Pts | Ref |
|---|---|---|---|---|---|---|---|---|---|---|---|---|---|---|---|---|---|---|---|---|---|---|---|---|---|---|---|
| 2009 | Win-Tron Racing | 32 | Toyota | DAY | SLM | CAR | TAL | KEN | TOL | POC | MCH | MFD | IOW | KEN | BLN | POC | ISF | CHI; 12 | | | | | KAN; 5 | CAR | 43rd | 695 | |
| 2009 | Win-Tron Racing | 32 | Dodge | | | | | | | | | | | | | | | | TOL; 9 | DSF; 19 | NJE | SLM | | | 43rd | 695 | |
