= Jimmy Thiel =

American racing driver

- Born: March 18, 1979 (age 47); Canton, Michigan, U.S.

ARCA Menards Series career
- 7 races run over 1 year
- Best finish: 28th (2003)
- First race: 2003 PFG Lester 150 (Nashville)
- Last race: 2003 Eddie Gilstrap Motors Fall Classic 200 (Salem)
Wins	Top tens	Poles
0	1	0
- Statistics up to date as of November 30, 2024.

Jimmy Thiel (born March 18, 1979) is an American former professional stock car racing driver who has competed in the ARCA Re/Max Series in 2003, getting a best finish of ninth at Nashville Superspeedway in seven starts.

Thiel is a former ARCA Moran Chevrolet Late Model champion at Flat Rock Speedway. He has also competed in series such as the ARCA Late Model Gold Cup Series, the Main Event Racing Series, the Iceman Super Car Series, and the Sweet Manufacturing Outlaw Super Late Model Series.

== Motorsports results ==
=== ARCA Re/Max Series ===
(key) (Bold – Pole position awarded by qualifying time. Italics – Pole position earned by points standings or practice time. * – Most laps led. ** – All laps led.)

ARCA Re/Max Series results
Year	Team	No.	Make	1	2	3	4	5	6	7	8	9	10	11	12	13	14	15	16	17	18	19	20	21	22	ARMSC	Pts	Ref
2003	Dusty Whitney	39	Pontiac	DAY	ATL	NSH; 15	SLM																			28th	910	
2003	Dusty Whitney	09	Pontiac					TOL; 29	KEN																	28th	910	
2003	Dusty Whitney	06	Pontiac							CLT; 15	BLN	KAN	MCH; 28	LER	POC	POC	NSH; 9	ISF	WIN	DSF	CHI; 31	SLM; 16	TAL	CLT	SBO	28th	910	
