= Mike Koch (racing driver) =

American racing driver

- Born: October 12, 1963 (age 63); Mountain Home, Arkansas, U.S.

ARCA Menards Series career
- 56 races run over 9 years
- Best finish: 20th (2007)
- First race: 2003 Kentuckiana Ford Dealers 200 (Salem)
- Last race: 2012 Allen Crowe 100 (Springfield)
Wins	Top tens	Poles
0	0	0
- Statistics up to date as of July 4, 2023.

Mike Koch (born October 12, 1963) is an American professional stock car racing driver who has previously competed in the ARCA Racing Series.

== Racing career ==
From 1999 to 2002, Koch competed in various racing series' like the Big Johnson Late Model National Championship, the Lucas Oil Midwest Late Model Racing Association, and Southern United Professional Racing Series.

In 2003, Koch would make his ARCA Re/Max Series debut at Salem Speedway driving the No. 06 Chevrolet for Wayne Peterson Racing, where he would finish 23rd due to vibrations in the car. He would make four more starts for Peterson before moving to his own team for the race at Winchester Speedway driving the No. 6 Chevrolet. In 2004, he would run one race for Peterson at Kansas Speedway, where he would finish 33rd due to transmission issues, before making four starts with Norm Benning Racing in the No. 8 Chevrolet with a best finish of 34th at Gateway International Raceway due to a clutch issue. He would then make two more starts for Benning the following year before making a start for his own team in the No. 87 Chevrolet at the DuQuoin State Fairgrounds dirt track, where he would finish 32nd due to vibrations due to vibrations in the car.

In 2006, Koch would attempt all but run race in the schedule for K&K Racing in a mix of Chevrolets and Pontiacs for the No. 79 entry, finishing 25th in the final points standings with a best finish of twentieth at Kansas despite failing to qualify fourteen races that year. For the following year in 2007, he would enter in all events on the schedule in the No. 79, where he would finish twentieth in the points with a best result of 22nd at Toledo Speedway despite failing to qualify for six races. In 2008, he would enter in the first seven races of the schedule, this time solely in a Chevrolet, failing to qualify at the season opening race at Daytona International Speedway, and qualifying for the next six races, getting a best result of 23rd at Rockingham Speedway.

In 2009, Koch would run at Salem in his self owned No. 28 Ford, where he would qualify in nineteenth and lead four laps before cutting a tire on lap 71 and eventually retiring from the race on lap 112 when the car developed brake issues. He would officially be classified in 21st. He would run three more races, with two of those races being run with Hixson Motorsports.

After not racing in the series in 2010, Koch would return in 2011 at DuQuoin, driving the No. 94 Chevrolet, where he would finish seven laps down in 24th after starting 31st. In 2012, he would fail to qualify for Daytona, before running five races in the No. 79 Chevrolet, getting a best result of nineteenth at the Illinois State Fairgrounds dirt track which would be his most recent start in ARCA competition.

Koch has most recently competed in the Scrappin 40's Super Stock Series at Legit Speedway Park in West Plains, Missouri, where he would finish fourteenth.

== Motorsports results ==
=== ARCA Racing Series ===
(key) (Bold – Pole position awarded by qualifying time. Italics – Pole position earned by points standings or practice time. * – Most laps led.)

ARCA Racing Series results
Year	Team	No.	Make	1	2	3	4	5	6	7	8	9	10	11	12	13	14	15	16	17	18	19	20	21	22	23	ARSC	Pts	Ref
2003	Wayne Peterson Racing	06	Chevy	DAY	ATL	NSH	SLM; 23	TOL; 25			BLN; 25	KAN; 28	MCH	LER	POC	POC											52nd	600	
2003	Wayne Peterson Racing	00	Chevy						KEN; 38	CLT																	52nd	600	
2003	K&K Racing	79	Chevy														NSH; DNQ	ISF									52nd	600	
2003	K&K Racing	6	Chevy																WIN; 33								52nd	600	
2003	K&K Racing	29	Chevy																	DSF; 35	CHI	SLM	TAL	CLT	SBO		52nd	600	
2004	Wayne Peterson Racing	6	Chevy	DAY	NSH	SLM	KEN	TOL	CLT	KAN; 33																	87th	280	
2004	Norm Benning Racing	8	Chevy								POC; 37	MCH	SBO	BLN	KEN	GTW; 34	POC; 35	LER	NSH; 41	ISF	TOL	DSF	CHI	SLM	TAL		87th	280	
2005	K&K Racing	10	Chevy	DAY	NSH	SLM; DNQ																					37th	1035	
2005	K&K Racing	87	Chevy				KEN; DNQ	TOL; DNQ	LAN				KAN; Wth	KEN	BLN	POC	GTW	LER; DNQ	NSH; DNQ	MCH; DNQ	ISF; DNQ	TOL; DNQ	DSF; 32	CHI; DNQ	SLM; DNQ	TAL; Wth	37th	1035	
2005	Norm Benning Racing	8	Chevy							MIL; 40	POC; 39	MCH															37th	1035	
2006	K&K Racing	79	Pontiac	DAY; DNQ																	TOL; DNQ		CHI; 37	SLM; DNQ	TAL; DNQ	IOW; DNQ	25th	2175	
2006	K&K Racing	79	Chevy		NSH; DNQ	SLM; DNQ	WIN; 34	KEN; DNQ	TOL; DNQ	POC		KAN; 20	KEN; 37	BLN; DNQ	POC; 30	GTW; 38	NSH; DNQ	MCH; 41	ISF; DNQ	MIL; DNQ		DSF; 22					25th	2175	
2006	K&K Racing	87	Pontiac								MCH; DNQ																25th	2175	
2007	K&K Racing	79	Pontiac	DAY; DNQ	USA; 34	NSH; 35	SLM; DNQ	KAN; 41							BLN; 26	KEN; DNQ				MIL; 26	GTW; 37		CHI; 39	SLM; 24	TAL; DNQ	TOL; DNQ	20th	2610	
2007	K&K Racing	79	Chevy						WIN; 31	KEN; DNQ	TOL; 22	IOW; 33	POC; 36	MCH; 37			POC; 23	NSH; 35	ISF; 24			DSF; 38					20th	2610	
2008	K&K Racing	79	Chevy	DAY; DNQ	SLM; 35	IOW; 37	KAN; 31	CAR; 23	KEN; 34	TOL; 34	POC	MCH	CAY	KEN	BLN	POC	NSH	ISF	DSF	CHI	SLM	NJE	TAL	TOL			45th	685	
2009	K&K Racing	28	Ford	DAY	SLM; 21	CAR	TAL																				58th	530	
2009	Hixson Motorsports	28	Ford					KEN; 31	TOL	POC	MCH	MFD	IOW	KEN	BLN	POC	ISF	CHI	TOL	DSF	NJE	SLM		CAR; 40			58th	530	
2009	K&K Racing	79	Chevy																				KAN; 37				58th	530	
2011	K&K Racing	94	Chevy	DAY	TAL	SLM	TOL	NJE	CHI	POC	MCH	WIN	BLN	IOW	IRP	POC	ISF	MAD	DSF; 24	SLM	KAN	TOL					137th	110	
2012	K&K Racing	79	Chevy	DAY; DNQ	MOB	SLM	TAL	TOL	ELK; 28	POC	MCH	WIN; 22	NJE	IOW; 31	CHI; 31	IRP	POC	BLN	ISF; 19	MAD; Wth	SLM	DSF	KAN				39th	520	
