= Adam Edwards =

American racing driver

- Born: March 26, 1980 (age 46); Falls Church, Virginia, U.S.

NASCAR FedEx Freight Truck Series career
- 8 races run over 3 years
- 2015 position: 75th
- Best finish: 75th (2015)
- First race: 2012 Pocono Mountains 125 (Pocono)
- Last race: 2015 Drivin' for Linemen 200 (Gateway)
Wins	Top tens	Poles
0	0	0
- Statistics up to date as of October 22, 2016.

Adam Edwards (born May 9, 1980) is an American professional stock car racing driver and professional driving instructor.

== Racing career ==
Edwards became interested in the mechanics of racing during his high school years and decided to pursue a career in auto racing. In 2002, he got his start into racing by becoming an owner-driver in the Pure Stock Division of the NASCAR Weekly Series. Five years later in 2007, Edwards broke into the national ranks by starting in five ARCA Racing Series events posting a best finish of 17th for Andy Belmont Racing at the Pocono Raceway.

Edwards partnered up with Norm Benning in 2012 and made his debut in the NASCAR Camping World Truck Series driving the No. 75 Chevrolet in a start and park effort. He finished 33rd after falling out of the race within five laps.

In 2014, after a two-year hiatus, Benning and Edwards reunited by attempting five races continuing the start and park efforts. All of his starts that year were in late field filler entries (the Truck Series had short starting fields that year in a number of races), which is why he received zero points in the 2014 standings. The following year, Edwards raced for Jennifer Jo Cobb in two races at the Texas Motor Speedway and the Gateway Motorsports Park.

Edwards also pursues in instructing and is a driving instructor at Andy Hillenburg's Fast Track High Performance Racing School where he coaches drivers and fans of Motorsports.

== Personal life ==
Edwards was born in Falls Church, Virginia, on May 9, 1980, and graduated from Virginia Tech in 2002 and again in 2007 with an MBA. He co-authored the novel Faster Pastor with Sharyn McCrumb; the 2010 book is loosely based on his teaching experiences.

== Motorsports career results ==
=== NASCAR ===
(key) (Bold – Pole position awarded by qualifying time. Italics – Pole position earned by points standings or practice time. * – Most laps led.)

==== Camping World Truck Series ====
NASCAR Camping World Truck Series results
Year	Team	No.	Make	1	2	3	4	5	6	7	8	9	10	11	12	13	14	15	16	17	18	19	20	21	22	23	NCWTC	Pts	Ref
2012	Norm Benning Racing	75	Chevy	DAY	MAR	CAR	KAN	CLT	DOV	TEX	KEN	IOW	CHI	POC; 33	MCH	BRI	ATL	IOW	KEN	LVS	TAL	MAR	TEX	PHO	HOM		76th	11	
2014	Norm Benning Racing	75	Chevy	DAY	MAR	KAN	CLT	DOV	TEX	GTW; 29																	106th	0^{1}	
2014	Norm Benning Racing	71	Chevy								KEN; 30	IOW	ELD	POC													106th	0^{1}	
2014	Norm Benning Racing	57	Chevy												MCH; 28	BRI	MSP	CHI; 30	NHA	LVS	TAL	MAR	TEX; 29	PHO	HOM		106th	0^{1}	
2015	Jennifer Jo Cobb Racing	0	Chevy	DAY	ATL	MAR	KAN	CLT	DOV	TEX; 30	GTW; 31	IOW	KEN	ELD	POC	MCH	BRI	MSP	CHI	NHA	LVS	TAL	MAR	TEX	PHO	HOM	75th	14	

^{*} Season still in progress
^{1} Ineligible for series points

=== ARCA Re/Max Series ===
(key) (Bold – Pole position awarded by qualifying time. Italics – Pole position earned by points standings or practice time. * – Most laps led.)

ARCA Re/Max Series results
Year	Team	No.	Make	1	2	3	4	5	6	7	8	9	10	11	12	13	14	15	16	17	18	19	20	21	22	23	ARSC	Pts	Ref
2007	Andy Belmont Racing	10	Ford	DAY	USA; DNQ	NSH	SLM	KAN	WIN	KEN																	70th	370	
2007	Andy Belmont Racing	62	Ford								TOL; 33	IOW; 32					POC; 17	NSH	ISF	MIL	GTW; 39	DSF	CHI	SLM	TAL	TOL	70th	370	
2007	Norm Benning Racing	8	Chevy										POC; 41	MCH	BLN	KEN											70th	370	
