= Tim Mitchell (racing driver) =

American racing driver (born 1943)

- Born: April 2, 1943 (age 83) Fayetteville, Tennessee, U.S.
- Debut season: 1997
- Starts: 134
- Championships: 0
- Wins: 0
- Podiums: 0
- Poles: 0
- Best finish: 15th in 2001
- Statistics up to date as of November 2, 2022.

Tim Mitchell (born April 2, 1943) is an American former professional stock car racing driver. He had competed in the ARCA Menards Series from 1997 to 2011, with a majority of his starts being with Wayne Peterson Racing.

== Racing career ==
After competing in various dirt track events across Tennessee, Mitchell would make his ARCA Bondo/Mar-Hyde Series debut in 1997, driving for Wayne Peterson Racing in the No. 06 Pontiac, running in four races with a best finish of 27th at Michigan International Speedway. For 1998, he would run three races; one race with Drew White, and the other two for Peterson. In 1999, he would remain with Peterson for two races with a best finish of 27th at Pocono Raceway, and would run three more races with him the following year.

For 2001, Mitchell would run 16 of the 25 races on the schedule driving various Peterson entries. It was also during this season that he would earn a career best finish of 11th at Toledo Speedway. Eight more top-20's over the course of the season would help propel him to a career best 15th in the overall standings for that season. He would run a near-full schedule in 2002, failing to qualify for five events, and racing in 15 events, including a one race deal with Norm Benning in the No. 8 Chevrolet at Salem Speedway. In 2003, he would start out the year with Peterson, before attempting two races with Benning, failing to qualify at Salem, and finishing 40th at Nashville Superspeedway.

In 2004, Mitchell would run the full schedule for Peterson in the No. 0 Chevrolet, failing to qualify three times, and only finishing three races with a best finish of 22nd at the season finale at Talladega Superspeedway. He would attempt the full schedule again in 2005, running in 20 races whilst failing to qualify for three, with a best finish of 15th at Pocono. In 2006, Mitchell would primarily drive the No. 06 entry for Peterson, once again attempting the full schedule, although he would fail to qualify twelve times that year (including the second Kentucky race and Gateway where he would fill in the No. 06 for that race). He would race thirteen times that year with a best result of 19th at Berlin Raceway.

Mitchell would once again attempt the full schedule in 2007, primarily driving a Ford, failing to qualify five times and earning a best result of 14th at Winchester Speedway. He would run his last full schedule in 2008, solely driving the No. 06 entry for Peterson, failing to qualify three times that year while getting a season best finish of 19th at Talladega, which would be the last ARCA race he would be running at the end.

After spending two years out of the series, Mitchell would return to the now ARCA Racing Series at Talladega, reuniting with Wayne Peterson to drive the No. 0 Ford. He would finish 39th and last after running only three laps due to a clutch issue. He would run two more races later that year with Fast Track Racing in the No. 10 Dodge, finishing 31st at Salem, and 37th at Kansas Speedway. These would be his last two starts in ARCA competition.

== Personal life ==
In 2003, Mitchell was diagnosed with colon cancer, and underwent treatment and surgery. He was able to make a full recovery, although he would have to wear a colostomy bag due to his rectum being removed during the operation.

According to Mitchell's Facebook page, he is the owner of a skate center named Starwheels Skate Center in his hometown of Fayetteville, Tennessee, and had sponsored him through the latter stages of his racing career.

== Motorsports results ==
=== ARCA Racing Series ===
(key) (Bold – Pole position awarded by qualifying time. Italics – Pole position earned by points standings or practice time. * – Most laps led.)

ARCA Racing Series results
Year	Team	No.	Make	1	2	3	4	5	6	7	8	9	10	11	12	13	14	15	16	17	18	19	20	21	22	23	24	25	ARSC	Pts	Ref
1997	Wayne Peterson Racing	06	Pontiac	DAY	ATL; 31	SLM	CLT; 30	CLT	POC	MCH; 27	SBS	TOL	KIL	FRS	MIN	POC	MCH	DSF	GTW	SLM	WIN	CLT; 32	TAL	ISF	ATL				N/A	-	
1998	White Motorsports	12	Chevy	DAY	ATL	SLM	CLT	MEM	MCH	POC; 38	SBS	TOL																	N/A	-	
1998	Wayne Peterson Racing	0	Pontiac										PPR; 29	POC	KIL	FRS	ISF	ATL	DSF	SLM									N/A	-	
1998	Wayne Peterson Racing	18	Pontiac																		TEX; 29	WIN	CLT	TAL	ATL				N/A	-	
1999	Wayne Peterson Racing	06	Pontiac	DAY	ATL	SLM	AND	CLT	MCH	POC; 27	TOL	SBS	BLN; 26	POC	KIL	FRS	FLM	ISF	WIN	DSF				ATL; DNQ					90th	195	
1999	White Motorsports	06	Pontiac																		SLM; DNQ	CLT	TAL						90th	195	
2000	Wayne Peterson Racing	6	Pontiac	DAY	SLM	AND	CLT	KIL	FRS	MCH	POC	TOL	KEN	BLN	POC	WIN	ISF; 22	KEN	DSF; 18	SLM; 27	CLT	TAL	ATL						63rd	355	
2001	Jack Martin	18	Chevy	DAY	NSH; DNQ	WIN	SLM	GTY	KEN																				15th	2665	
2001	Wayne Peterson Racing	6	Pontiac							CLT; 15		MCH; 27	POC; 20	MEM; 20	GLN					ISF; 19	CHI; 16		SLM; 13	TOL; 11	BLN; 14				15th	2665	
2001	Wayne Peterson Racing	61	Pontiac								KAN; 16																		15th	2665	
2001	Wayne Peterson Racing	06	Chevy													KEN; 33										CLT; DNQ	TAL; 24	ATL; DNQ	15th	2665	
2001	Wayne Peterson Racing	6	Chevy														MCH; 21	POC; 22				DSF; 27							15th	2665	
2001	Wayne Peterson Racing	5	Chevy																NSH; 21										15th	2665	
2002	Wayne Peterson Racing	18	Chevy	DAY; DNQ	ATL; 31	NSH; 36																							18th	3020	
2002	Norm Benning Racing	8	Chevy				SLM; 33																						18th	3020	
2002	Brad Smith Motorsports	26	Ford					KEN; QL^{†}																					18th	3020	
2002	Wayne Peterson Racing	06	Chevy						CLT; DNQ			MCH; DNQ										CHI; 35		TAL; DNQ	CLT				18th	3020	
2002	Wayne Peterson Racing	6	Pontiac							KAN; 18			TOL; 24				POC; 19	NSH; 25	ISF; 24										18th	3020	
2002	Wayne Peterson Racing	6	Chevy								POC; 20			SBO; 18		BLN; 22				WIN; 16	DSF; 22		SLM; 28						18th	3020	
2002	Wayne Peterson Racing	06	Pontiac												KEN; DNQ														18th	3020	
2003	Wayne Peterson Racing	6	Chevy	DAY; DNQ	ATL; 19	NSH; DNQ																							107th	240	
2003	Norm Benning Racing	8	Chevy				SLM; DNQ	TOL	KEN	CLT	BLN	KAN	MCH	LER	POC	POC	NSH; 40	ISF	WIN	DSF	CHI	SLM	TAL	CLT	SBO				107th	240	
2004	Wayne Peterson Racing	0	Chevy	DAY; DNQ	NSH; DNQ	SLM; 34	KEN; 30	TOL; 30	CLT; 25	KAN; 34	POC; 31	MCH; 29	SBO; 27	BLN; 26	KEN; 35	GTW; 29	POC; 26	LER; 28	NSH; 33	ISF; 35	TOL; 34	DSF; 34	CHI; DNQ	SLM; 30	TAL; 22				16th	2835	
2005	Wayne Peterson Racing	0	Chevy	DAY; DNQ	NSH; DNQ	SLM; 30	KEN; 25	TOL; 31	LAN; 31	MIL; 33	POC; 15	MCH; 41	KAN; 32	KEN; 39	BLN; DNQ		GTW; 41	LER; 33	NSH; 25	MCH; 27	ISF; 22	TOL; 32	DSF; 25	CHI; 31	SLM; 22	TAL; 25			17th	2950	
2005	Wayne Peterson Racing	6	Chevy													POC; 36													17th	2950	
2006	Wayne Peterson Racing	06	Chevy	DAY; DNQ			WIN; 32		TOL; DNQ										ISF; 32						TAL; DNQ				20th	2605	
2006	Wayne Peterson Racing	06	Ford		NSH; DNQ	SLM; DNQ		KEN; 40		POC; 24	MCH; 31	KAN; DNQ	KEN; 33	BLN; 19	POC; 28	GTW; 22	NSH; DNQ	MCH; DNQ		MIL; 29	TOL; 23	DSF; 30	CHI; DNQ	SLM; 34		IOW; DNQ			20th	2605	
2006	Wayne Peterson Racing	0	Ford										KEN; DNQ			GTW; DNQ													20th	2605	
2007	Wayne Peterson Racing	06	Chevy	DAY; DNQ																					TAL; DNQ				17th	3105	
2007	Wayne Peterson Racing	06	Ford		USA; 25	NSH; DNQ	SLM; 29	KAN; 31	WIN; 14	KEN; 30	TOL; 21	IOW; 30	POC; 26	MCH; 40	BLN; 25	KEN; 28	POC; 21	NSH; 27	ISF; 41	MIL; 21	GTW; 24	DSF; 27	CHI; DNQ	SLM; 23		TOL; DNQ			17th	3105	
2008	Wayne Peterson Racing	06	Chevy	DAY; 21															DSF; DNQ	CHI; 34	SLM; 30	NJE; 39		TOL; DNQ					21st	2950	
2008	Wayne Peterson Racing	06	Ford		SLM; DNQ	IOW; 30	KAN; 29	CAR; 24	KEN; 26	TOL; 29	POC; 21	MCH; 35	CAY; 22	KEN; 35	BLN; 24	POC; 27	NSH; 24	ISF; 34					TAL; 19						21st	2950	
2011	Wayne Peterson Racing	0	Ford	DAY	TAL; 39	SLM	TOL	NJE	CHI	POC	MCH	WIN	BLN	IOW	IRP	POC	ISF	MAD	DSF										114th	155	
2011	Fast Track Racing	10	Dodge																	SLM; 31	KAN; 37	TOL							114th	155	
^{†} - Qualified but replaced by Brad Smith
