= Jerry Middleton =

American racing driver

- Born: August 5, 1960 (age 66); Richmond, Indiana, U.S.

ARCA Menards Series career
- 35 races run over 4 years
- Best finish: 17th (2003)
- First race: 1997 GM Goodwrench 150 (DeGraff)
- Last race: 2003 Bank of America 200 Presented by Fox 21/27 (South Boston)
Wins	Top tens	Poles
0	0	0
- Statistics up to date as of November 30, 2024.

Jerry Middleton (born August 5, 1960) is an American former professional stock car racing driver who has competed in the ARCA Re/Max Series from 1997 to 2003.

Middleton also competed in the Cooper Tires USF2000 Championship.

== Motorsports results ==
=== ARCA Re/Max Series ===
(key) (Bold – Pole position awarded by qualifying time. Italics – Pole position earned by points standings or practice time. * – Most laps led. ** – All laps led.)

ARCA Re/Max Series results
Year	Team	No.	Make	1	2	3	4	5	6	7	8	9	10	11	12	13	14	15	16	17	18	19	20	21	22	ARMSC	Pts	Ref
1997	N/A	17	Olds	DAY	ATL	SLM	CLT	CLT	POC	MCH	SBS; 15	TOL; 14	KIL; 20	FRS	MIN	POC	MCH	DSF			WIN; 13	CLT	TAL	ISF	ATL	N/A	0	
1997	N/A	71	Olds																GTW; 22	SLM						N/A	0	
1998	Bobby Gerhart Racing	85	Olds	DAY	ATL	SLM; 15	CLT	MEM	MCH	POC	SBS; 22				KIL; 22	FRS; 22	ISF	ATL	DSF	SLM; 33	TEX	WIN; 27	CLT	TAL	ATL	N/A	0	
1998	Bobby Gerhart Racing	85	Chevy									TOL; 32	PPR	POC												N/A	0	
2002	Norm Benning Racing	8	Chevy	DAY; 30	ATL	NSH	SLM	KEN	CLT	KAN	POC	MCH	TOL	SBO	KEN	BLN	POC	NSH	ISF	WIN; 34	DSF			TAL; DNQ	CLT; 41	75th	410	
2002	Chuck Weber Racing	14	Chevy																			CHI; 37	SLM			75th	410	
2003	Hixson Motorsports	2	Chevy	DAY; DNQ	ATL; 20	NSH; 19	SLM; 26	TOL; 18	KEN; 23	CLT; 27	BLN; 19	KAN; 17	MCH; 26	LER; 20	POC; 20	POC; 41	NSH; 28	ISF; 31	WIN; 34	DSF; 31	CHI; 33	SLM; 34	TAL; 41	CLT; DNQ	SBO; 22	17th	3285	
