= 2003 ARCA Re/Max Series =

American stock car series

2003 ARCA RE/MAX Series

Seasons
- ← 2002 2004 →

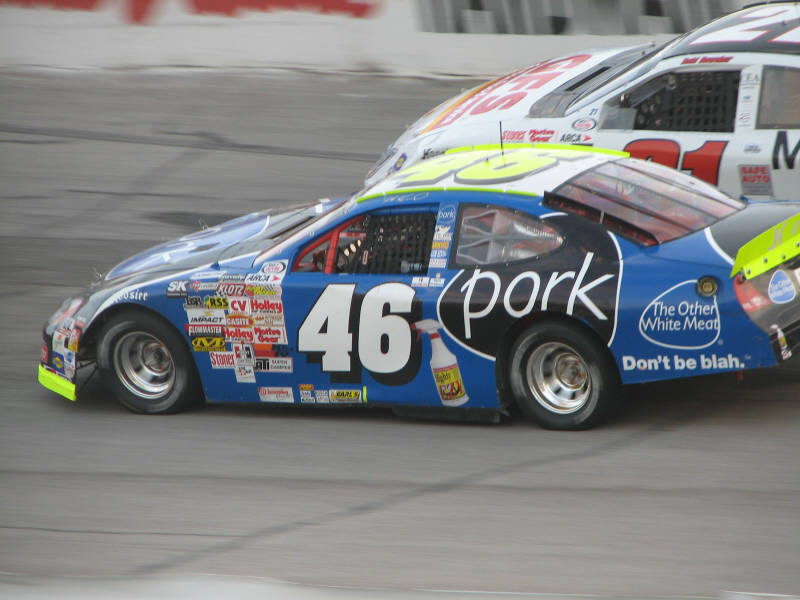
Frank Kimmel, driving the No. 46 car for Clement Racing (pictured in 2006), the 2003 ARCA champion. This was the fifth of his 10 championships in the series and fourth of 8 straight.

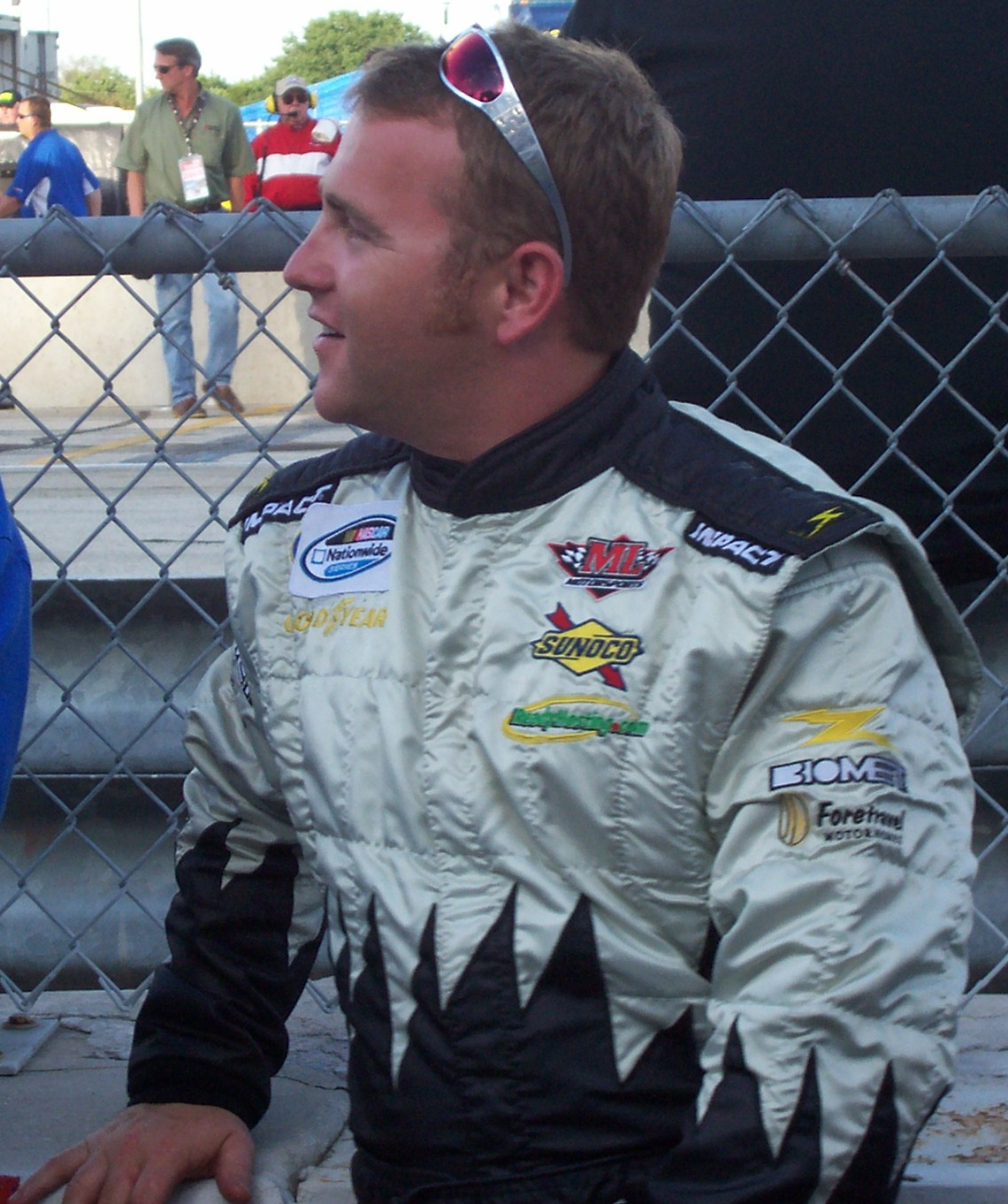
Shelby Howard finished third in the championship standings.

The 2003 ARCA Re/Max Series was the 51st season of the ARCA Racing Series, a division of the Automobile Racing Club of America (ARCA). The season began on February 8, 2003, with the Advance Discount Auto Parts 200 at Daytona International Speedway. The season ended with the Bank of America 200 Presented by Fox 21/27 at South Boston Speedway on October 18. Frank Kimmel won the drivers championship, his fifth in the series and fourth in a row, and Bill Eversole won the Rookie of the Year award.

== Schedule & Winners ==
Date	Track	City	Event name	Pole winner	Race winner
February 8	Daytona International Speedway	Daytona Beach, Florida	Advance Discount Auto Parts 200	Bobby Gerhart	Chase Montgomery
March 8	Atlanta Motor Speedway	Hampton, Georgia	Atlanta ARCA 400	Frank Kimmel	Mark Gibson
April 11	Nashville Superspeedway	Lebanon, Tennessee	PFG Lester 150	Kyle Busch	Kyle Busch
April 27	Salem Speedway	Washington Township, Indiana	Kentuckiana Ford Dealers 200	Frank Kimmel	Shelby Howard
May 4	Toledo Speedway	Toledo, Ohio	GFS Marketplace 200	Ken Schrader	Frank Kimmel
May 10	Kentucky Speedway	Sparta, Kentucky	The Channel 5 205	Frank Kimmel	Kyle Busch
May 23	Lowe's Motor Speedway	Concord, North Carolina	ADG 100	Frank Kimmel	Frank Kimmel
May 24	Berlin Raceway	Marne, Michigan	Pork, The Other White Meat 200	Fred Campbell	Frank Kimmel
June 1	Kansas Speedway	Kansas City, Kansas	BPU 200	Frank Kimmel	Shelby Howard
June 14	Michigan Speedway	Brooklyn, Michigan	Flagstar 200	Casey Mears	Casey Mears
July 12	Lake Erie Speedway	Greenfield Township, Pennsylvania	ARCA Re/Max 200	Billy Venturini	Frank Kimmel
July 25	Pocono Raceway	Long Pond, Pennsylvania	Giant 200	Casey Mears	Casey Mears
July 26	Pocono Raceway	Long Pond, Pennsylvania	Pennsylvania 200	Kyle Busch	Casey Mears
August 9	Nashville Superspeedway	Lebanon, Tennessee	Waste Management 200	Frank Kimmel	Mario Gosselin
August 17	Illinois State Fairgrounds	Springfield, Illinois	Allen Crowe Memorial ARCA 100	Frank Kimmel	Frank Kimmel
August 30	Winchester Speedway	White River Township, Indiana	Winchester ARCA Re/Max 200	Paul Menard	Frank Kimmel
September 1	DuQuoin State Fairgrounds	Du Quoin, Illinois	Southern Illinois 100	Tony Stewart	Tony Stewart
September 6	Chicagoland Speedway	Joliet, Illinois	ReadyHosting.com 200	Frank Kimmel	Frank Kimmel
September 13	Salem Speedway	Washington Township, Indiana	Eddie Gilstrap Motors Fall Classic 200	Brian Ross	Shelby Howard
September 27	Talladega Superspeedway	Lincoln, Alabama	Food World 300	Kyle Busch	Paul Menard
October 9	Lowe's Motor Speedway	Concord, North Carolina	EasyCare Vehicle Service Contracts 150	Frank Kimmel	Kirk Shelmerdine
October 18	South Boston Speedway	South Boston, Virginia	Bank of America 200	Ken Schrader	Ken Schrader

=== Drivers' championship ===
(key) Bold – Pole position awarded by time. Italics – Pole position set by final practice results or rainout. * – Most laps led. ** – All laps led.

Pos.	Driver	Races																						Points
Pos.	Driver	DAY	ATL	NSH	SLM	TOL	KEN	CLT	BER	KAN	MCH	LER	POC	POC	NSH	ISF	WIN	DQN	CHI	SLM	TAL	CLT	SBO	Points
1	Frank Kimmel	5	5*	2	**2***	1*	**2**	1*	1*	**3***	3	1*	2	3	**31**	**1**	1*	5	**1***	22	4	21*	2	6145
2	Jason Jarrett	20	3	11	6	2	5	6	7	4	9	6	34	6	5	7	3	18	11	2	15	6	4	5470
3	Shelby Howard	37	2	36	1	3	4	13	6	1	23	5	5	23	3	33	2	24	22	1*	27	8	12	5015
4	Brent Sherman	13	4	3	30	8	34	10	2	2	6	14	13	5	33	21	6	21	4	26	11	10	13	4975
5	Billy Venturini	3	9	16	3	5	10	17	4*	23	38	**2***	10	8	27	8	9	16	26	20	2	9	29	4945
6	Mark Gibson	9	1	7	19	24	6	7	30	6	12	15	3	4	8	3	19	6	8	19	32	35	33	4830
7	Bill Eversole	15	10	20	27	9	29	30	9	27	11	8	11	33	10	9	12	7	7	11	7	23	27	4575
8	Christi Passmore	28	13	9	9	17	12	14	29	25	29	10	8	19	11	20	23	22	9	27	5	7	28	4515
9	Ron Cox	12	8	12	15	10	9	19	3	29	19	24	29	21	19	4	31	33	16	9	33	25	7	4445
10	Todd Bowsher	17	25	27	11	15	16	21	13	26	13	9	9	12	20	11	5	8	29	24	12	39	34	4410
11	Andy Belmont	29	31	32	5	4	13	8	28	24	37	3	4	10	14	26	18	32	28	7	16	24	25	4250
12	Mike Buckley	26	17	21	13	13	24	38	18	13	25	21	19	14	18	17	7	19	15	30	14	40	26	4105
13	Norm Benning	21	40	22	8	26	27	26	21	31	24	16	31	40	25	5	14	4	21	8	18	28	8	4015
14	Darrell Basham	22	21	26	34	14	22	29	22	10	22	27	26	38	26	13	20	13	23	13	40	34	18	3770
15	Chuck Weber	25	16	24	16	21	35	36	23	12	35	18	25	16	24	24	25	34	18	28	19	30	35	3640
16	Brad Smith	DNQ	22	29	18	23	26	28	27	14	21	25	16	15	22	19	21	28	13	23	QL	DNQ	32	3610
17	Jerry Middleton	DNQ	20	19	26	18	23	27	19	17	26	20	20	41	28	31	34	31	33	34	41	DNQ	22	3285
18	Brian Conz	DNQ					32	33	24	30	41		21	28	39	35	DNQ	38	32	35	37			1720
19	A. J. Henriksen	11	34			33	30	5			10		24	7			30		20		34	2		1600
20	Randy Van Zant				14	11	36		15			11				12	4		27	5				1405
21	Bobby Gerhart	**14***									20	7	7	32			11			29	36		14	1305
22	Kyle Busch			**1***			1*	11			36			**25***							**28**	17		1160
23	Joe Cooksey				7		7		12			28		18		18		3						1145
24	Carl McCormick					22	20	31			18		12	17	17				14					1085
25	Bob Strait	2	38				Wth			7						22*		26	3			15		1080
26	Casey Mears							4			**1***		**1***	1										1005
27	Justin Allgaier				12	6										28	15	30		3				915
28	Jimmy Thiel			15		29		15			28				9				31	16				910
29	Keith Murt	DNQ	DNQ	33			14			9	32				12						8	38		910
30	Matt Hagans	40			24		3				4								38	10	25			895
31	Andy Ponstein					12			5		31						8					4		875
32	Greg Sarff			17			15				16		33	34					35		10			835
33	Wayne Anderson			DNQ				DNQ		8	39				7				5			18		820
34	Chase Montgomery	1	23	25			31										17				31			765
35	Michael Simko				10	27	8				14								25				DNQ	755
36	Jeremy Clements	34	7	35				3														3		750
37	Jeff Caudell				25								18	20				29		25			17	735
38	Ken Weaver						Wth	37			40			9	13				12		26			720
39	Rick Carelli	6		10						5	27													700
40	Greg Sacks	7												26					2			19		680
41	Darryl Sage			5	20										35				6	DNQ		DNQ		680
42	Jeff Fultz		36	4				2														11		675
43	Tandy Marlin		6	14											6							27		660
44	Paul Menard				4			34									**26**				1*		DNQ	660
45	Jimmy Henderson		DNQ	13			Wth	9			7			39										630
46	Mario Gosselin							DNQ					23	36	1*							14		630
47	Alex Whitman																			6		DNQ	16	625
48	David Ray Boggs							25								34		25		17		5		620
49	John Sadinsky					16			11			23					10							620
50	Bob Aiello		12	DNQ				20		21		13												615
51	Ken Schrader					**28***												2					**1***	615
52	Mike Koch				23	25	38		25	28					DNQ		33	35						600
53	Dan Shaver	30	41				18	40			30					29			39		39	26		600
54	Aaron Fike																					16	9	585
55	Clint Vahsholtz			8						37					16				10					565
56	Clair Zimmerman					19			17			19											21	540
57	Tom Eriksen											4	28	24		25								540
58	Brack Maggard	DNQ	15								DNQ		22	22							29			530
59	Ryan Unzicker															6		17		12				515
60	Kirk Shelmerdine																					1*	DNQ	510
61	Jason Hedlesky							DNQ			15				37		24				13			505
62	David Clay					30			20			22					13							495
63	Jim Eubanks				17											16		10						475
64	Mike Langston				29		11				34						16							470
65	Vern Slagh	39	37			31	37		31		17						DNQ				38			460
66	Hermie Sadler										2												3	440
67	Doug Keller									38						2		12						430
68	Ric McMillon																			14	17	29		390
69	Marty Butkovich					32			16		DNQ	17							DNQ					390
70	Fred Campbell					7			**8**															390
71	Charles Hudson					Wth							14	11								DNQ		385
72	Spencer Morgan																						24	385
73	Frog Hall	DNQ	18	28						20														360
74	Billy Shotko								10														10	360
75	Clint Bowyer														2							20		350
76	Tim Steele	35	35	39					Wth		5													350
77	Tim Burrell															14		14					DNQ	350
78	Deborah Renshaw	24		38	21		33																	340
79	Allen Patterson		DNQ	31	DNQ								30	35	38				34					335
80	Johnny Leonard											26								15			31	330
81	Doug Stevens		39		33										4							DNQ		330
82	Tony Ave	23																			3			330
83	Robby Benton	19						12														DNQ		330
84	Keith Segars	4																			23			325
85	James Hylton									19			QL				22		37					315
86	Terry English															10		20						310
87	Brad Payne														15					32			30	305
88	Kim Crosby		DNQ				21								23						35			295
89	Phil Bozell																			18			15	295
90	Eric Smith												6	27								Wth		295
91	Clay Rogers							22														12		290
92	Tim Turner	38	24	DNQ				39										36				DNQ		285
93	David Ragan											12											23	285
94	Dale Schweikart												17	DNQ					24					280
95	Aaron Call	32	14	37																				275
96	Jamie Mosley			23			28	32																275
97	Andy Hillenburg	8	29																					275
98	Jim Walker											29				32	29				DNQ			265
99	Henry Benfield	DNQ						DNQ			DNQ			13								DNQ		265
100	Randy Ainsworth									11					29									260
101	Chris Anthony								14			Wth						27						255
102	Christian Fittipaldi	10												31										255
103	Jim Hollenbeck								26							15								255
104	Caleb Holman			18				24																250
105	Brian Kaltreider												15	29										240
106	Shawna Robinson	33	11																					240
107	Tim Mitchell	DNQ	19	DNQ	DNQ										40									240
108	Robbie Cowart		27					23														DNQ		235
109	Hideo Fukuyama		DNQ	34				16					38											235
110	Jerick Johnson							DNQ		18					32							Wth		235
111	Dicky Williamson	DNQ	32					35													30			230
112	Kevin Belmont		28					18																230
113	Tony Stewart																	**1***						225
114	Jerry Glanville			6			Wth																	225
115	David Reutimann													2										220
116	Eric McClure										8											DNQ		215
117	Brian Ross																			**4**				210
118	Dennis English				28											23								205
119	Terry Jones																DNQ			31			20	205
120	L. W. Miller																						5	205
121	Roger Williams			Wth				DNQ													20	DNQ		205
122	Travis Geisler																						6	200
123	Mark Thompson																				6			200
124	C. W. Smith													DNQ							9			185
125	Billy Thomas																	9						185
126	Blake Feese																						11	175
127	Jerry Nemire																	11						175
128	Mike Wirth											32			36							DNQ	DNQ	170
129	Brett Oakley					Wth	17																	170
130	Dick Tracey	DNQ	DNQ	DNQ							DNQ		32	DNQ										170
131	Bobby Bowsher									32			36	37										165
132	Wayne Peterson									36			37					37	QL		DNQ			165
133	Cam Strader																					13		165
134	John O'Neal Jr.									15														155
135	Perry Tripp																	15						155
136	Jeff Spraker	16											Wth											150
137	Chris Comalander														21							DNQ		150
138	Justin Ashburn	31		30																				145
139	Mark Schulz																		17					145
140	Larry Hollenbeck	DNQ																			22			145
141	Jason Basham												27	DNQ	DNQ									145
142	Chuck Walker	18	DNQ																					140
143	Richard King	Wth	33																		DNQ	41		140
144	Darrel Krentz						19																	135
145	Tony Quarles																						19	135
146	Joe Ruttman																		19					135
147	Scott Traylor									19														135
148	Steve Cronenwett					20																		130
149	Josh Weston						DNQ								30							DNQ		130
150	Boomer Stevens											34					DNQ			33				125
151	David Stremme																				21			125
152	Brett Whitmore																			21				125
153	Troy Backlund									22														120
154	Ryan Thigpen																					22		120
155	Ryan Vos				22						DNQ													120
156	Robbin Slaughter				DNQ												27							120
157	Charlie Schaefer																	23						115
158	Boris Said																				24			110
159	Mike Burg						25																	105
160	Todd Antrican										DNQ		35	DNQ										105
161	Stuart Kirby		26																					100
162	Fred Zack						Wth				DNQ								36					100
163	Chris Bingham	27																						95
164	Jamie Passmore															27								95
165	Danny Eaves				DNQ				32															95
166	Frank Kapfhammer			DNQ	32																			95
167	Neil McClelland		DNQ				DNQ										32			DNQ				95
168	David Simko																28							90
169	Todd Coon															30								80
170	Wally Fowler		30																					80
171	Mike Haggenbottom												QL	30										80
172	Jon Morley																		30					80
173	Chuck Steinle Jr.											33												80
174	A. J. Alsup										33													80
175	Butch Jarvis																					31		75
176	Greg Smartt				31																			75
177	Eileen Smith											31												75
178	Chuck Hiers																					32		70
179	Tom Buzze																					33		65
180	Jennifer Jo Cobb									33														65
181	Ed Wettlaufer											33					DNQ							65
182	Johnny Antonio									34														60
183	David Keith														34									60
184	Mike Basham			DNQ						39														60
185	Alan Markovitz											35												55
186	Ricky Sanders									35														55
187	Ed Kennedy	36																						50
188	Jim Pate																					36		50
189	Paul Booher																					37		45
190	Mike Harmon			40																				30
191	Billy Deckman									40														
192	Dale Kreider	DNQ																						
193	Anthony Hill	DNQ																						
194	Joel Garner	DNQ																						
195	Mel Welan	DNQ																						
196	Jon Kerley	DNQ																						
197	John Neal		DNQ					DNQ														DNQ		
198	Burt Ingle						Wth	DNQ							DNQ							DNQ		
199	Andy Lombi							DNQ														DNQ		
200	Tom Potts														DNQ								DNQ	
201	Randy Nobach																				DNQ			
202	Bill Paskiewicz																				DNQ	DNQ		
203	Rusty Morgan																					DNQ		
204	Roger Moser																					DNQ		
205	Chris Wimmer																					DNQ		
206	Tom Berte																					DNQ		
207	Ian Henderson																					DNQ		
208	Dean MacInnis																					Wth	DNQ	
209	Lance Deiters																						DNQ	
210	Matt Carter																						DNQ	
211	Bob Kelly	Wth																						
212	Willie Green						Wth																	
213	David Morris								Wth															
Pos.	Driver	DAY	ATL	NSH	SLM	TOL	KEN	CLT	BER	KAN	MCH	LER	POC	POC	NSH	ISF	WIN	DQN	CHI	SLM	TAL	CLT	SBO	Points

== See also ==
- 2003 NASCAR Winston Cup Series
- 2003 NASCAR Busch Series
- 2003 NASCAR Craftsman Truck Series
- 2003 NASCAR Goody's Dash Series
