= Southern United Professional Racing =

Southern United Professional Racing (SUPR) operates auto racing series for Late Model and Sprint Car racing on dirt tracks in the Southern United States. Founded in 1990, most of the series' races are held at tracks in Arkansas, Louisiana, Mississippi, and Texas; selected events take place in surrounding states.

Kenny Merchant is the winningest driver in series history, with 57 wins.

== Series champions ==
- 1990: Doug Ingalls
- 1991: Tony Cardin
- 1992: Doug Ingalls
- 1993: Donald Watson
- 1994: Doug Ingalls
- 1995: Ronnie Poche
- 1996: Ricky Ingalls
- 1997: Butch Patton
- 1998: Rusty Cummings
- 1999: David Ashley
- 2000: Jay Blair
- 2001: Jay Blair
- 2002: Rodney Wing
- 2003: Kenny Merchant
- 2004: Rob Litton
- 2005: David Ashley
- 2006: David Ashley
- 2007: Ray Moore
- 2008: Kenny Merchant
- 2009: Kenny Merchant
- 2010: Rob Litton
- 2011: Morgan Bagley
- 2012: Rob Litton
