= 2009 ARCA Re/Max Series =

American stock car series

2009 ARCA Re/Max Series season

Seasons
- ← 2008 2010 →

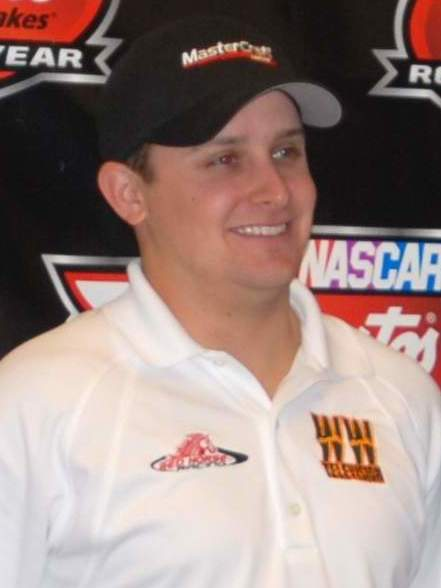
Justin Lofton, the 2009 ARCA champion.

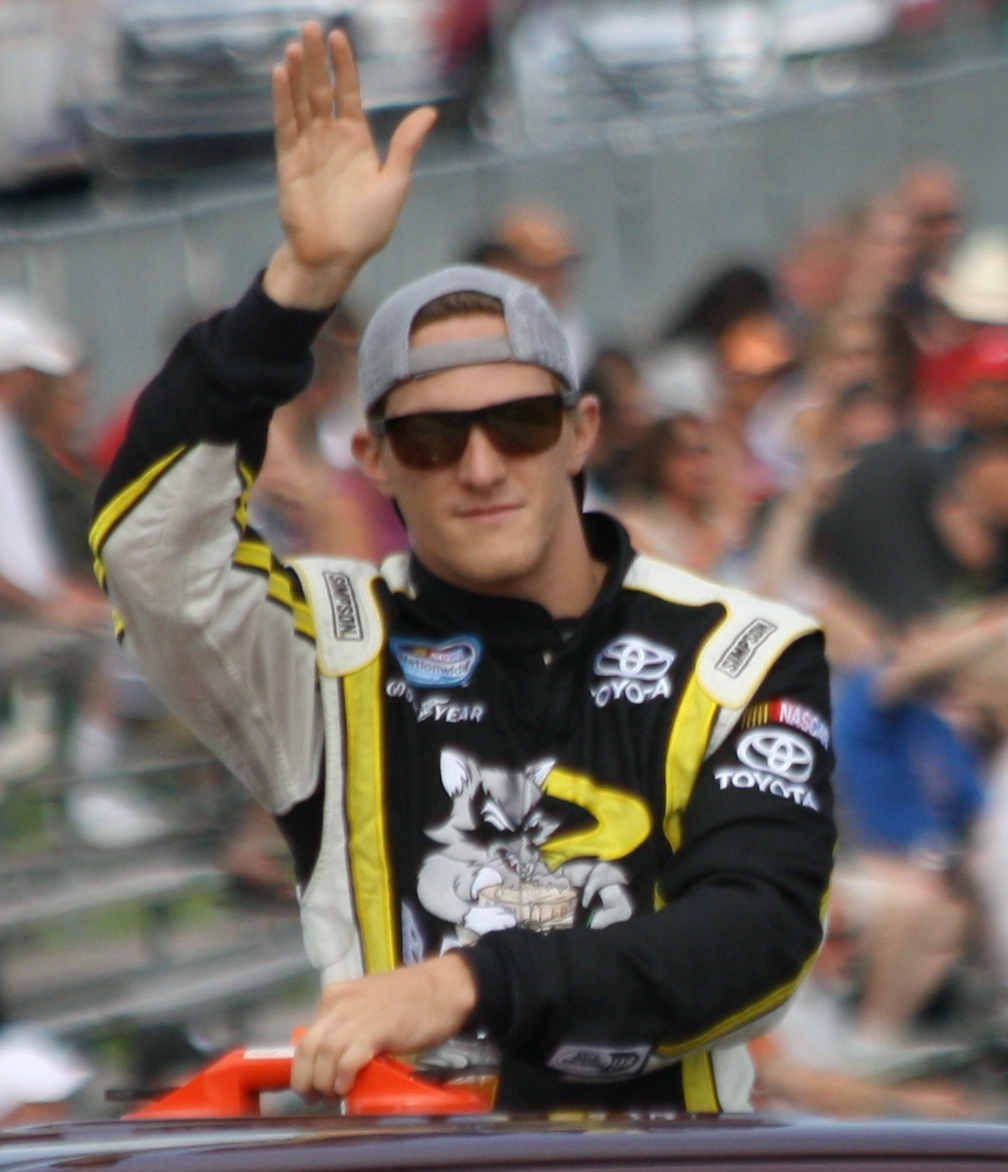
Parker Kligerman finished second behind Lofton in the championship by just 5 points.

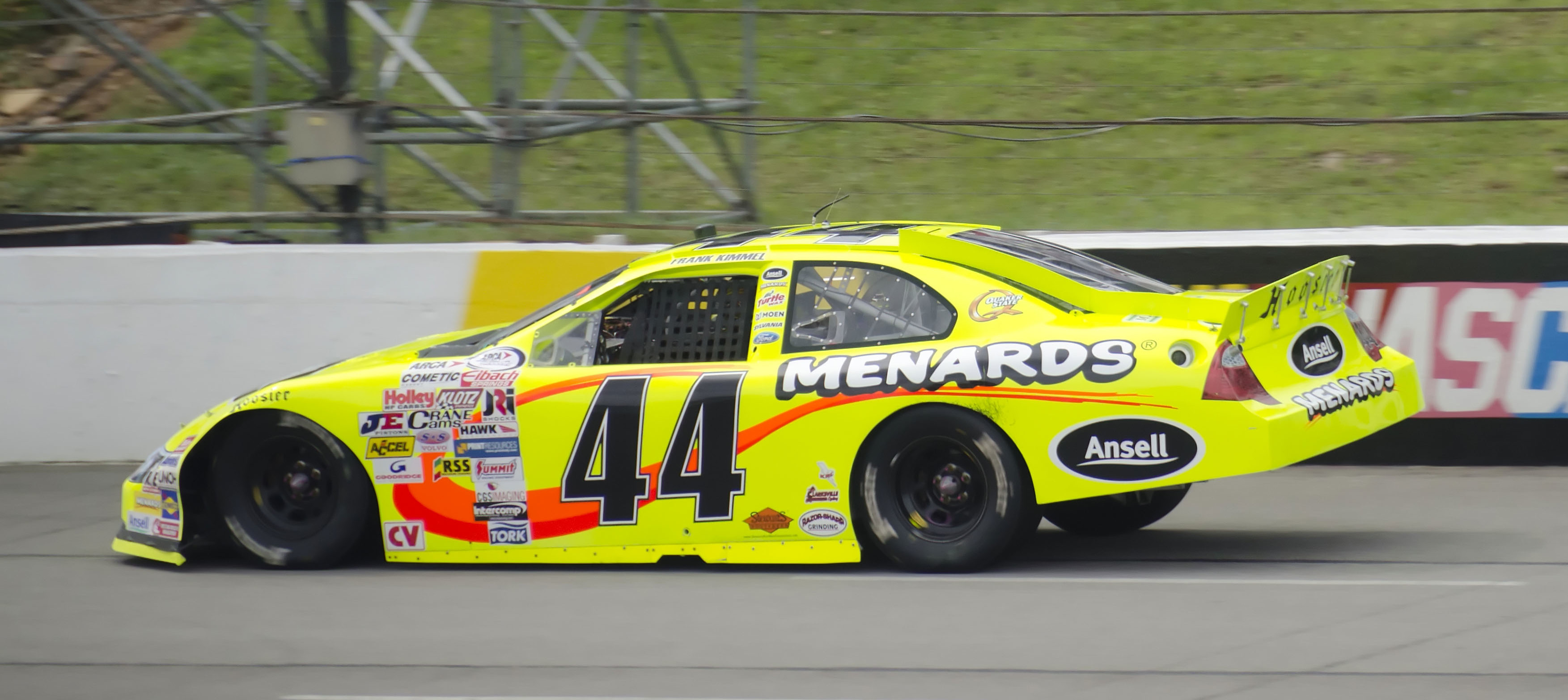
Frank Kimmel, driving the No. 44 car for his family team, finished third in the championship.

The 2009 ARCA Re/MAX Series was the 57th season of the ARCA Racing Series. The season began on February 7 with the Lucas Oil Slick Mist 200 and ended on October 11 with the Rockingham ARCA 200. Justin Lofton of Eddie Sharp Racing won the season championship.

This season's championship result was the closest in ARCA history, as Lofton won the title over Kligerman by a mere five points. Although Kligerman won an astounding nine races that season, Lofton (who won six races) was able to barely beat him, mainly on the strength of earning bonus points for winning poles. Lofton won five poles that year while Kligerman won zero.

== Schedule ==
The series' 2009 schedule was announced by ARCA on October 30, 2008.

== Results and standings ==
=== Races ===
Date	Track	Event name	Pole winner	Race winner
February 7	Daytona International Speedway	Lucas Oil Slick Mist 200	Justin Lofton	James Buescher
April 5	Salem Speedway	Kentuckiana Ford Dealers 200	Justin Lofton	Patrick Sheltra
April 19	Rockingham Speedway	ARCA RE/MAX Carolina 200	Ken Schrader	Sean Caisse
April 24	Talladega Superspeedway	Talladega ARCA 250	Tom Hessert III	Justin Lofton
May 9	Kentucky Speedway	Drive Smart Buckle-Up 150	James Buescher	James Buescher
May 17	Toledo Speedway	Toledo ARCA 200	Matt Merrell	Parker Kligerman
June 6	Pocono Raceway	Pocono ARCA 200	Justin Lofton	Joey Logano
June 12	Michigan International Speedway	Racing For Wildlife 200	Justin Lofton	Parker Kligerman
June 20	Mansfield Motorsports Park	Mansfield ARCA 200	Justin Lofton	Parker Kligerman
July 11	Iowa Speedway	Prairie Meadows 200	Joey Coulter	Parker Kligerman
July 18	Kentucky Speedway	Drive Smart Buckle-Up 150	Brian Ickler	Parker Kligerman
July 25	Berlin Raceway	Berlin ARCA 200	Justin Lofton	Justin Lofton
August 1	Pocono Raceway	Pennsylvania 200	Justin Lofton	Justin Lofton
August 23	Illinois State Fairgrounds Racetrack	Allen Crowe 100	Justin Lofton	Parker Kligerman
August 28	Chicagoland Speedway	Chicagoland ARCA 150	Brian Ickler	Justin Lofton
September 4	Toledo Speedway	Toledo ARCA 200	Justin Lofton	Justin Lofton
September 7	DuQuoin State Fairgrounds Racetrack	Southern Illinois 100	A. J. Fike	Parker Kligerman
September 13	New Jersey Motorsports Park	ARCA 150	Patrick Long	Patrick Long
September 19	Salem Speedway	ARCA Fall Classic	Chris Buescher	Justin Lofton
October 1	Kansas Speedway	Kansas Lottery $150 Grand	Justin Lofton	Parker Kligerman
October 11	Rockingham Speedway	Rockingham ARCA 200	Chad Finley	Parker Kligerman

=== Standings ===
**No**	**Driver**	**Points**	**Wins**	**Top 5**	**Top 10**
1st	Justin Lofton	5715	6	15	19
2nd	Parker Kligerman	5710	9	14	18
3rd	Frank Kimmel	5260	0	8	14
4th	Joey Coulter	5020	0	7	13
5th	Craig Goess	4705	0	2	12
6th	Bryan Silas	4625	0	1	10
7th	Steve Arpin	4575	0	4	11
8th	Tom Hessert III	4495	0	1	8
9th	Patrick Sheltra	4485	1	4	8
10th	Robb Brent	4315	0	1	6
11th	Tim George Jr.	4235	0	1	2
12th	Darrell Basham	3710	0	0	2
13th	Jeremy Petty	3635	0	0	0
14th	Brad Smith	3310	0	0	0
15th	James Hylton	3180	0	0	0
16th	Barry Fitzgerald	2945	0	0	0
17th	Jason Basham	2835	0	0	0
18th	Kory Rabenold	2430	0	0	0
19th	Todd Antrican	2000	0	0	0
20th	Alli Owens	1895	0	0	2

=== Full Drivers' Championship ===
(key) Bold – Pole position awarded by time. Italics – Pole position set by final practice results or rainout. * – Most laps led.

Pos	Driver	DAY	SLM	CAR	TAL	KEN	TOL	POC	MCH	MFD	IOW	KEN	BER	POC	ISF	CHI	TOL	DQN	NJE	SLM	KAN	CAR	Points
1	Justin Lofton	**3**	**2***	22	1*	2	2*	2	30*	**4***	10	3	**1***	1*	**6***	1*	1*	6	6	1*	2	3	5715
2	Parker Kligerman	7	3	5	7	17	1*	6	1	1*	1*	1*	6	21	1	17	3*	1	2	2	1*	1*	5710
3	Frank Kimmel	11	7	11	5	5	13	14	12	9	7	8	12	5	9	5	4	2	9	4	4	12	5260
4	Joey Coulter	23	16	30	8	28	7	4	5	2	**3**	7	5	12	21	6	**2***	3	11	15	7	9	5020
5	Craig Goess	17	15	6	30	7	14	9	10	10	12	4	7	3	26	8	6	34	10	23	10	17	4705
6	Bryan Silas	24	8	4	12	9	8	15	9	8	17	22	9	13	20	22	7	10	28	9	25	14	4625
7	Steve Arpin	26	17	10	11	29	21	11	8	5	8	6	11	4	5	36	10	9	32	5	8	34	4575
8	Tom Hessert III	25	6	13	**10**	27	3	28	17	15	29	10	10	6	23	25	11	18	8	8	14	16	4495
9	Patrick Sheltra	14	1*	2	33	6	29	3	33	21	14	9	14	11	3	9	17	31	7	16	11	38	4485
10	Robb Brent	DNQ	10	34	34	8	9	7	11	25	11	12	15	7	13	15	12	11	4	20	34	21	4315
11	Tim George Jr.	8	24	15	13	14	17	19	13	22	19	23	25	19	14	21	16	23	5	22	15	22	4235
12	Darrell Basham	9	25	36	20	23	10	22	34	18	22	26	21	23	19	29	21	12	20	19	35	30	3710
13	Jeremy Petty		13	26	22	18	12	17	19	12	28	21	18	20	16	26	24	14	19	12	30	26	3635
14	Brad Smith	DNQ	18	29	29	24	18	27	26	24	25	24	29	35	34	31	19	21	23	18	28	31	3310
15	James Hylton	DNQ	23	28	15	36	23	24	24	26	27	28	24	31	28	27	29	30	26	26	27	37	3180
16	Barry Fitzgerald	13	DNQ	27	31	37	34	31	25	27	31	25	26	26	27	40	26	35	24	24	32	DNQ	2945
17	Jason Basham		27	31	35	32	22	25	36	29	26	29	20	24	38	37	28	15	18	17	29	32	2835
18	Kory Rabenold										24	20	17	16	15	18	14	13	16	14	21	28	2430
19	Todd Antrican			DNQ	37	33	32	32	37	28	33	34	31	33	35	33	23	24	31	25	36		2000
20	Alli Owens	40		12	6			10	16			13		22		19			17		12	13	1895
21	Matt Merrell		11	3			5	5		20	18		2	2	10					13			1865
22	Ken Schrader		5	**7***			15								7		5	5				4	1650
23	Grant Enfinger			19	3							2	13			2					3	7	1625
24	Stephan McCurley	DNQ	19	23	19	20	11	29	20	7										6			1575
25	Chris Buescher		4				16			3	4						8			**21**		6	1560
26	Dakoda Armstrong						20				6	11		29			13			3		8	1415
27	Brian Ickler			20		5			35		5	**5**				**4**					33	DNQ	1390
28	Michel Disdier					16	19		18	19		19	16				15					25	1355
29	Mikey Kile	27			4	25		8	6			30		15							6		1235
30	Bobby Gerhart	19			26			12	14			15		9		14					20		1195
31	Gabi DiCarlo	31		14		12		30			20			18					12	11			1100
32	Chad Finley						6				9		3									**15**	1035
33	Ken Weaver	5	20	24	38	11	28																975
34	Kyle Martel			18				18						10		20						36	895
35	Justin Marks								27*					8					21			11	850
36	Ron Cox		12	38	24					17					2			17					810
37	Norm Benning	10	14	32							35											35	770
38	Terry Jones	20			14	DNQ	31		28								25			7			755
39	James Buescher	1*				1*			4		30												735
40	Wayne Peterson				41				DNQ	32	37	37	34	DNQ	37		31	36			40	DNQ	725
41	Ken Butler III														33	28	18	22	25	10			700
42	Justin Lloyd												8				22					19	695
43	Beau Slocumb															12	9	19			5		695
44	Tom Berte					21		37				27		30					15		18		640
45	Brett Butler	39									15			38							38	24	630
46	Scott Alves		26	37							34	33	30									DNQ	625
47	Chase Mattioli	35			32			36	DNQ		32			32					13		19		615
48	Kevin Belmont					22	30	21	21	16	QL												600
49	Tony Palumbo			DNQ			DNQ		23					39		30						27	600
50	Austin Dillon					15			2		2												595
51	Sean Corr					26		13						14		13							590
52	Jesse Smith					3			31							7					31		580
53	Hal Martin									11						3					9		575
54	Darwin Greene															23					16	39	550
55	Clay Rogers								32								32					5	550
56	Drew Herring			16																		18	540
57	Joe Cooksey									13					11			7					535
58	Mike Koch		21			31															37	40	530
59	Larry Meadors		28							31	36	36	33			39	30			29			530
60	J. R. Heffner	DNQ			27	30						14				16							510
61	Ryan Crane			8					7												23		500
62	Jonathon Gomez															24						20	490
63	Casey Roderick																					2	480
64	Joey Logano	2						1*															460
65	Johanna Long										23											29	450
66	A. J. Fike														4			**4***					445
67	John Ferrier	16			18									17									435
68	Brett Moffitt																					10	430
69	Butch Jarvis	DNQ	DNQ	40	40	34																	420
70	Will Kimmel	18													8			33					395
71	Alex Yontz			9		10																	380
72	Chase Miller							16	3														365
73	Corey LaJoie																					23	365
74	Michael Simko								29				28			10							355
75	John Wes Townley	4			17																		355
76	Troy Wangerin				28						21										24		350
77	Sean Caisse			1			25																335
78	Todd Hansen								15		13												320
79	Kyle Grissom																					33	315
80	Marc Easton							35	39	30				34					33				295
81	Andrew Belmont												19		17								280
82	Jonathan Eilen					13							23										280
83	Free Pennington																					41	280
84	Jesus Hernandez											38											275
85	Ricky Carmichael	21		17																			270
86	Mark Littleton														18			20					270
87	Brian Tyler														30			8					270
88	Bill Baird	37			2																		265
89	Kelly Kovski														12			29					255
90	Patrick Long																		**1***				250
91	Matt Carter	28									16												240
92	Ed Kennedy	6			39																		235
93	Damon Lusk														29			16					235
94	Eddie Mercer	29			16																		235
95	Levi Youster						26										20						230
96	Eddie Pearson														22			25					225
97	Nur Ali	38		21												35							220
98	Mike Harmon	12			36																		220
99	Brian Kaltreider							20						28									220
100	Billy Leslie			39						23			32										220
101	Spencer Pumpelly																		3				220
102	Peyton Sellers	36																			13		215
103	Chris Cockrum	33										17											210
104	Chris Lafferty													41	24			32					210
105	Paul Menard						4																210
106	Peter Shepherd III												4										210
107	Brad Sweet											16				34							210
108	Kyle Chady														25			26					205
109	Jeffery MacZink						24										27						205
110	Jake Crum									6													200
111	Kelly Bires				9																		195
112	Larry Hollenbeck	15							38														195
113	Greg Seevers		29			35						35											195
114	Kent Schenkel								22							32							190
115	Todd Hoddick	DNQ								14													185
116	Brett Hudson		9																				185
117	Charlie Vest											18		37									185
118	Stuart Kirby															11							175
119	Mark Gibson														31			28					165
120	Josh Richards											32						27					165
121	Dale Shearer												27		32								165
122	Nick Igdalsky																		14				160
123	Zachary Gibson						27	34															155
124	Jeff Buice			33															29				150
125	Dwight Laird													36		38			34				150
126	Dicky Williamson	DNQ			21																		150
127	Nate Monteith																				17		145
128	Steve Blackburn	DNQ			23																		140
129	Dustin Delaney					19																	135
130	Lance Fenton																				22		120
131	Jody Hixson												22										120
132	Michael Phelps	22																					120
133	Bob Schacht																		22				120
134	Brent Sherman		22																				120
135	Brent Cross							23															115
136	Steve Fox													25									105
137	Mark Thompson				25																		105
138	Curt Tori			25																			105
139	Chad Beahr							26															100
140	Doug Keller																				26		100
141	Todd Bowsher																			27			95
142	Ed Bull																		27				95
143	Ed Pompa													27									95
144	Shannon Robertson																			28			90
145	Chuck Walker							33	40														90
146	Brent Brevak			35								39											80
147	Willie Mullins																		30				80
148	Bradley Riethmeyer											31											80
149	Brian Scott	30																					80
150	Ryan Fischer	32																					70
151	Brian Johnson Jr.						33																65
152	Mario Gosselin	34																					60
153	Brad Dubil														36								50
154	Jennifer Jo Cobb																				39		35
155	Michael Annett	41																					30
156	Benny Chastain	42																					30
157	J. R. Fitzpatrick	43																					30
158	Mike Holt													40									30
159	Spencer Maggard																		35				
160	Roger Carter	DNQ																					
161	Justin Koch																					DNQ	
162	Kyle Johnson			Wth																			
Pos	Driver	DAY	SLM	CAR	TAL	KEN	TOL	POC	MCH	MFD	IOW	KEN	BER	POC	ISF	CHI	TOL	DQN	NJE	SLM	KAN	CAR	Points

== See also ==
- 2009 NASCAR Sprint Cup Series
- 2009 NASCAR Nationwide Series
- 2009 NASCAR Camping World Truck Series
- 2009 NASCAR Camping World East Series
- 2009 NASCAR Camping World West Series
- 2009 NASCAR Whelen Modified Tour
- 2009 NASCAR Whelen Southern Modified Tour
- 2009 NASCAR Canadian Tire Series
- 2009 NASCAR Mini Stock Series
- 2009 NASCAR Corona Series
