= Dominick Casola =

American racing driver (born 1987)

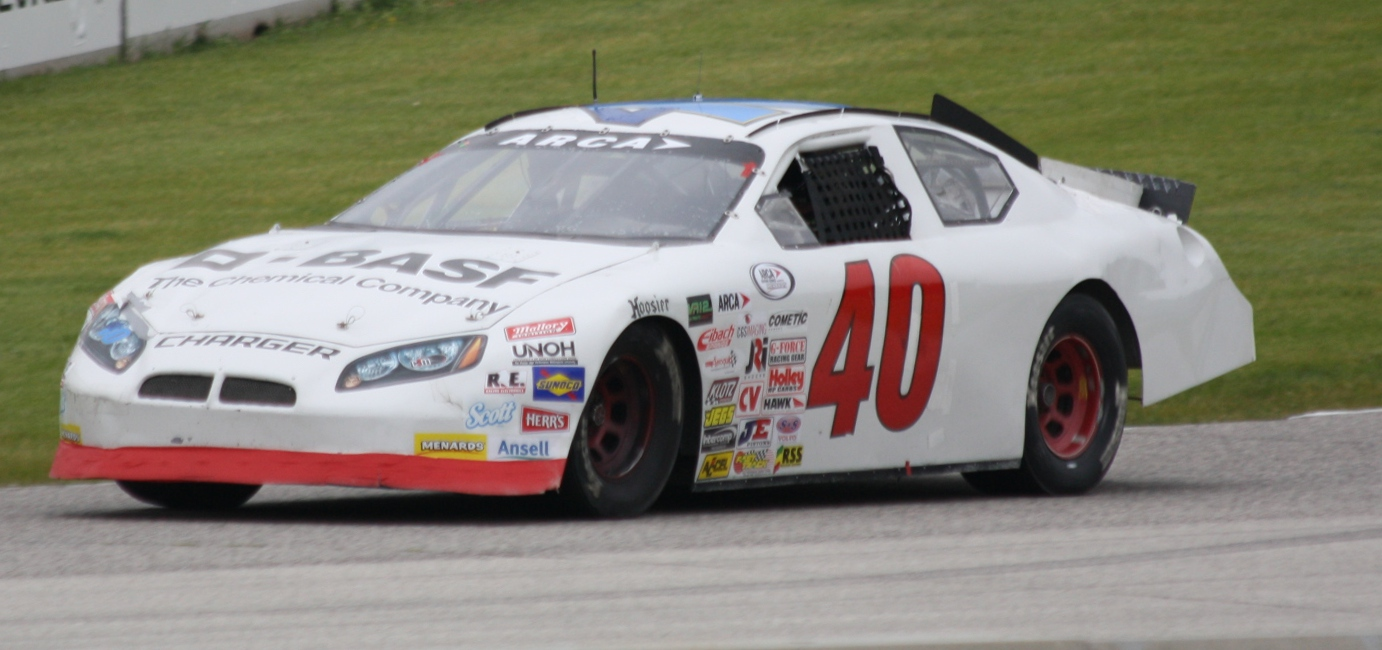
- Casola's No. 40 ARCA car at Road America in 2013
- Born: August 17, 1987 (age 39) Holmdel, New Jersey, U.S.

ARCA Menards Series career
- Debut season: 2006
- Starts: 41
- Wins: 0
- Poles: 0
- Best finish: 13th in 2007
- Finished last season: 38th (2013)

Previous series
- 2006, 2008, 2009: X-1R Pro Cup Series, NASCAR Nationwide Series, NASCAR Camping World East Series

NASCAR FedEx Freight Truck Series career
- 2 races run over 2 years
- Best finish: 76th (2013)
- First race: 2010 Mountain Dew 250 (Talladega)
- Last race: 2013 Pocono Mountains 125 (Pocono)
Wins	Top tens	Poles
0	0	0
- Statistics up to date as of March 20, 2020.

Dominick Casola (born August 17, 1987) is an American former professional stock car racing driver who most recently competed in what is now the ARCA Menards Series in 2013. He drove in ARCA for a total of four seasons full or part-time. He also ran two races in the NASCAR Truck Series, and made one attempt in the Nationwide Series in 2008.

== Racing career ==
Casola started out racing in local Saturday night short track races, winning races and championships along the way. He eventually reached the Hooters X-1R Pro Cup Series, which he competed in part-time for a single season in 2006 (in his family's No. 02 car). He could not get behind the wheel of a stock car until age seventeen because of New Jersey state regulations. Despite this, he worked at sending resumes to many ARCA and NASCAR teams.

Casola got a chance to compete in ARCA full-time and for rookie of the year in 2007, driving the No. 1 Ford for Andy Belmont's team and sponsored by his family's business A. Casola Farms. He only missed one race that season, the season-opener at Daytona, with his car owner Belmont in the car for that race (which he failed to qualify for), presumably because Casola had never competed on a plate track before meaning he would not be approved to race. Finishing the season thirteenth in points, Casola got three top-ten finishes as well as two top-fives, which were a fifth at Gateway and a third at Talladega.

For the 2008 season, he joined Win-Tron Racing to drive their No. 32 Dodge part-time, sharing this car with Andy Hanson, Chris Wimmer, James Buescher, Matt Merrell, and Bradley Riethmeyer. He ran the first six races of the season, before then only competing in both races at his home track of Pocono as well as Berlin. He earned his first top-10 of the season at the first of the two Pocono races.

In 2010, Casola made his debut in the NASCAR Camping World Truck Series, driving the No. 00 Chevrolet Silverado for Daisy Ramirez Motorsports at Talladega. Since he was a late entry for the race, he received zero points. This was his only start in any NASCAR series that year. He started 35th and finished 28th in the race.

Casola did not race in any series in 2011, and believed that his career was over at that point. However, in August 2012, driver Roger Carter, owner of the Carter 2 Motorsports team in the ARCA Series, called Casola to drive for his team when the normal driver of his car (Larry Barford Jr.) parted ways with them and he needed a new driver. His first and only race for C2M that year came at the dirt race at Springfield, where he started and finished 26th in the No. 04 Dodge. He returned to the team in the No. 40 for a part-time schedule in 2013, splitting time in that car with Galen Hassler, Nick Tucker, Mark Meunier, Cody Lane, Korbin Forrister, Justin Lloyd, Joseph Hughs, and David Sear. Casola ran six races, which included both races at Pocono again as well as his other home track of New Jersey Motorsports Park. His best finish was a sixteenth at Chicago. The other two races he ran were Road America and DuQuoin. On top of that, he returned to the Truck Series that year in their race at Pocono, driving the No. 28 for FDNY Racing.

Although he has not made any stock-car starts since the 2013 season, Casola, as recently as 2018, continues to occasionally compete in local late model races, including at Wall Stadium, according to his Facebook page.

== Motorsports career results ==
=== NASCAR ===
(key) (Bold – Pole position awarded by qualifying time. Italics – Pole position earned by points standings or practice time. * – Most laps led.)

==== Nationwide Series ====
NASCAR Nationwide Series results
Year	Team	No.	Make	1	2	3	4	5	6	7	8	9	10	11	12	13	14	15	16	17	18	19	20	21	22	23	24	25	26	27	28	29	30	31	32	33	34	35	NNSC	Pts	Ref
2008	Stott Classic Racing	02	Chevy	DAY	CAL	LVS	ATL	BRI	NSH	TEX	PHO	MXC	TAL	RCH	DAR	CLT	DOV; DNQ	NSH	KEN	MLW	NHA	DAY	CHI	GTY	IRP	CGV	GLN	MCH	BRI	CAL	RCH	DOV	KAN	CLT	MEM	TEX	PHO	HOM	N/A	0	

^{*} Season still in progress
^{1} Ineligible for series points

==== Camping World Truck Series ====
NASCAR Camping World Truck Series results
Year	Team	No.	Make	1	2	3	4	5	6	7	8	9	10	11	12	13	14	15	16	17	18	19	20	21	22	23	24	25	NCWTC	Pts	Ref
2010	Daisy Ramirez Motorsports	00	Chevy	DAY	ATL	MAR	NSH	KAN	DOV	CLT	TEX	MCH	IOW	GTY	IRP	POC	NSH	DAR	BRI	CHI	KEN	NHA	LVS	MAR	TAL; 28	TEX	PHO	HOM	122nd	0	
2013	FDNY Racing	28	Chevy	DAY	MAR	CAR	KAN	CLT	DOV	TEX	KEN	IOW	ELD	POC; 29	MCH	BRI	MSP	IOW	CHI	LVS	TAL	MAR	TEX	PHO	HOM				76th	15	

==== Camping World East Series ====
NASCAR Camping World East Series results
Year	Team	No.	Make	1	2	3	4	5	6	7	8	9	10	11	NCWEC	Pts	Ref
2009	Andy Belmont Racing	1	Ford	GRE; 29											47th	179	
2009	Olsen Racing	61	Chevy		TRI; 20	IOW	SBO	GLN	NHA	TMP	ADI	LRP	NHA	DOV	47th	179	

=== ARCA Racing Series ===
(key) (Bold – Pole position awarded by qualifying time. Italics – Pole position earned by points standings or practice time. * – Most laps led.)

ARCA Racing Series results
Year	Team	No.	Make	1	2	3	4	5	6	7	8	9	10	11	12	13	14	15	16	17	18	19	20	21	22	23	ARSC	Pts	Ref
2007	Andy Belmont Racing	1	Ford	DAY	USA; 17	NSH; 34	SLM; 25	KAN; 17	WIN; 25	KEN; 16	TOL; 18	IOW; 16	POC; 14	MCH; 25	BLN; 23	KEN; 36	POC; 8	NSH; 17	ISF; 13	MIL; 27	GTW; 5	DSF; 17	CHI; 38	SLM; 15	TAL; 3	TOL; 21	13th	3920	
2008	Win-Tron Racing	32	Dodge	DAY; 33	SLM; 27	IOW; 17	KAN; 22	CAR; 36	KEN; 10	TOL	POC; 8	MCH	CAY	KEN	BLN; 11	POC; 21	NSH	ISF	DSF								23rd	1580	
2008	Win-Tron Racing	38	Dodge																	CHI; 20	SLM	NJE					23rd	1580	
2008	Andy Belmont Racing	14	Ford																				TAL; 35	TOL			23rd	1580	
2012	Carter 2 Motorsports	04	Dodge	DAY	MOB	SLM	TAL	TOL	ELK	POC	MCH	WIN	NJE	IOW	CHI	IRP	POC	BLN	ISF; 26	MAD; 19	SLM	DSF	KAN				82nd	235	
2013	Carter 2 Motorsports	40	Dodge	DAY	MOB	SLM	TAL	TOL	ELK	POC; 27	MCH	ROA; 22	WIN	CHI; 16	NJE; 29	POC; 19	BLN	ISF	MAD	DSF; 23	IOW	SLM	KEN	KAN			38th	700	
