= Levi Youster =

American racing driver (born 1992)

- Born: Levi Sean Youster; August 11, 1992 (age 34); Oak Harbor, Ohio, U.S.

ARCA Menards Series career
- 30 races run over 4 years
- Best finish: 14th (2011)
- First race: 2009 Menards 200 (Toledo)
- Last race: 2012 Herr's Live Life with Flavor 200 (Madison)
| Wins | Top tens | Poles |
|---|---|---|
| 0 | 0 | 0 |
- Statistics up to date as of June 16, 2023.

Levi Sean Youster (born August 11, 1992) is an American former professional stock car racing driver. He last competed in the ARCA Racing Series.

== Racing career ==
In 2009, Youster made his ARCA Re/Max Series debut at the age of sixteen at Toledo Speedway, driving the No. 28 Ford for Hixson Motorsports, where he would finish 26th after starting 20th. He would return to Toledo several months later with the team, this time finishing 20th after starting 23rd. He would then run eight races for the team the following year, earning a season best finish of 15th at Toledo and Salem Speedway, although he would retire from the latter event due to handling issues.

In 2011, Youster would run the majority of races of the schedule, running in a variety of entries for Hixson. He would finish in the top-twenty seven times with a best finish of 14th at Winchester Speedway, and would finish 14th in the final standings. He would only run four races for Hixson the following year with a best finish of 20th at Salem. He would also make a start for Roulo Brothers Racing in the No. 99 Ford at Elko Speedway, where he would finish 27th after only three laps due to handling issues. He has not competed in an ARCA race since then.

== Personal life ==
On April 17, 2015, Youster was involved in an accident where he was struck by a car in an intersection at Chattanooga, Ohio, where he would be dragged across four blocks and sustain serious but non-life-threatening injuries. He was listed in critical condition upon being sent to the hospital before being upgraded to being in serious condition. He would spend the next three months in various hospitals and a rehab facility in order to recover.

On January 29, 2022, Youster would be arrested for assault, burglary, disorderly conduct, and public intoxication, with his bond being placed at US$5,000 five months later.

== Motorsports career results ==
=== ARCA Racing Series ===
(key) (Bold – Pole position awarded by qualifying time. Italics – Pole position earned by points standings or practice time. * – Most laps led. ** – All laps led.)

ARCA Racing Series results
| Year | Team | No. | Make | 1 | 2 | 3 | 4 | 5 | 6 | 7 | 8 | 9 | 10 | 11 | 12 | 13 | 14 | 15 | 16 | 17 | 18 | 19 | 20 | 21 | ARSC | Pts | Ref |
|---|---|---|---|---|---|---|---|---|---|---|---|---|---|---|---|---|---|---|---|---|---|---|---|---|---|---|---|
| 2009 | Hixson Motorsports | 28 | Ford | DAY | SLM | CAR | TAL | KEN | TOL; 26 | POC | MCH | MFD | IOW | KEN | BLN | POC | ISF | CHI | TOL; 20 | DSF | NJE | SLM | KAN | CAR | 95th | 230 | |
| 2010 | Hixson Motorsports | 28 | Ford | DAY | PBE | SLM | TEX | TAL | TOL; 30 | POC | MCH | IOW; 34 | | | | | | | | | | | | | 29th | 910 | |
| 2010 | Hixson Motorsports | 23 | Ford | | | | | | | | | | MFD; 17 | POC | BLN; 19 | NJE | ISF | CHI | DSF; 26 | | | | | | 29th | 910 | |
| 2010 | Hixson Motorsports | 23 | Chevy | | | | | | | | | | | | | | | | | TOL; 15 | SLM; 15 | KAN | CAR; 30 | | 29th | 910 | |
| 2011 | Hixson Motorsports | 23 | Chevy | DAY | TAL | SLM; 18 | TOL; 23 | | | | | | | | | | ISF; 17 | MAD; 24 | DSF; 22 | | | | | | 14th | 2305 | |
| 2011 | Hixson Motorsports | 7 | Chevy | | | | | NJE; 35 | | | | | | | | | | | | | | | | | 14th | 2305 | |
| 2011 | Hixson Motorsports | 23 | Ford | | | | | | CHI; 15 | POC | MCH; 20 | WIN; 14 | BLN; 17 | IOW; 18 | IRP; 23 | | | | | | | TOL; 25 | | | 14th | 2305 | |
| 2011 | Hixson Motorsports | 2 | Chevy | | | | | | | | | | | | | POC; DNQ | | | | | | | | | 14th | 2305 | |
| 2011 | Hixson Motorsports | 29 | Chevy | | | | | | | | | | | | | POC; 34 | | | | SLM; 30 | KAN; DNQ | | | | 14th | 2305 | |
| 2012 | Hixson Motorsports | 2 | Ford | DAY | MOB; 30 | SLM; 20 | TAL | | | | | | | | | | | | | | | | | | 40th | 500 | |
| 2012 | Hixson Motorsports | 3 | Ford | | | | | TOL; 27 | | | | | | | | | | | | | | | | | 40th | 500 | |
| 2012 | Roulo Brothers Racing | 99 | Ford | | | | | | ELK; 27 | POC | MCH | WIN | NJE | IOW | CHI | IRP | POC | BLN | ISF | | | | | | 40th | 500 | |
| 2012 | Hixson Motorsports | 3 | Chevy | | | | | | | | | | | | | | | | | MAD; 26 | SLM | DSF | KAN | | 40th | 500 | |
