= Darren Hagen =

American racing driver (born 1986)

- Born: July 2, 1986 (age 40); Riverside, California, U.S.

ARCA Menards Series career
- 5 races run over 2 years
- Best finish: 57th (2012)
- First race: 2011 Southern Illinois 100 (DuQuoin)
- Last race: 2012 Herr's Live Life With Flavor 200 (Madison)
Wins	Top tens	Poles
0	0	0
- Statistics up to date as of January 21, 2025.

Darren Hagen (born July 2, 1986) is an American former professional stock car racing driver who has previously competed in the ARCA Racing Series from 2011 to 2012.

Hagen also competed in series such as the USAC Indiana Midget Week Series, the USAC Sprint Car National Championship, the USAC National Midget Series, and the POWRi Lucas Oil National Midget Series.

== Motorsports results ==
=== ARCA Racing Series ===
(key) (Bold – Pole position awarded by qualifying time. Italics – Pole position earned by points standings or practice time. * – Most laps led.)

ARCA Racing Series results
Year	Team	No.	Make	1	2	3	4	5	6	7	8	9	10	11	12	13	14	15	16	17	18	19	20	ARSC	Pts	Ref
2011	Venturini Motorsports	25	Chevy	DAY	TAL	SLM	TOL	NJE	CHI	POC	MCH	WIN	BLN	IOW	IRP	POC	ISF	MAD	DSF; 12					83rd	235	
2011	Venturini Motorsports	15	Chevy																	SLM; 33	KAN	TOL		83rd	235	
2012	Carter 2 Motorsports	40	Dodge	DAY	MOB	SLM	TAL	TOL	ELK	POC	MCH	WIN	NJE	IOW	CHI	IRP; 26	POC							57th	375	
2012	Carter 2 Motorsports	04	Dodge															BLN; 21	ISF	MAD; 16	SLM	DSF	KAN	57th	375	
