= Tommy O'Leary IV =

American racing driver

- Born: February 8, 1991 (age 35); Cygnet, Ohio, U.S.

ARCA Menards Series career
- 30 races run over 5 years
- Best finish: 15th (2012)
- First race: 2011 Menards 200 (Toledo)
- Last race: 2024 Hard Rock Bet 200 (Daytona)
Wins	Top tens	Poles
0	0	0
- Statistics up to date as of March 6, 2024.

Tommy O'Leary IV (born February 8, 1991) is an American professional stock car racing driver who last competed part-time in the ARCA Menards Series, driving the No. 06 Chevrolet for Wayne Peterson Racing.

== Racing career ==
In 2009, O'Leary would compete in the ARCA Late Model Gold Cup, where he would finish in the top-fifteen twice in three starts. He would run only two races the following year, where he would get a best finish of twelfth.

In 2011, O'Leary would make his debut in the ARCA Racing Series at Toledo Speedway driving the No. 06 Ford, where he would finish 24th due to a crash. He would nine more races in the year, where he would get a best finish of 23rd at the season finale at Toledo. In 2012, he would run the majority of the races that year, with a majority of his starts coming for Wayne Peterson Racing. He would also make a start for Carter 2 Motorsports in the No. 40 Dodge at the Illinois State Fairgrounds dirt track, where he would get his best finish of the year in thirteenth. After not running in the series for the following year, he would return in 2014 with Carter 2 Motorsports, this time in the No. 97 Dodge, at Michigan International Speedway, where he would finish 25th after only two laps due to engine issues. He would return to Michigan the following year, this time with Wayne Peterson Racing in the No. 0 Ford, where he would finish 20th, albeit 48 laps down.

In 2016, O'Leary would compete in the ARCA Late Model Sportsman R&M Recycling Silver Cup, where he would finish in the top-ten twice with a best result of third at the second race at Toledo. He would finish fourth in the standings the following year at finishing in the top-five in all three races with a best result of third at Flat Rock Speedway. It was also during this year that would make select starts in the CRA Super Series, getting a best finish of 12th at Flat Rock. He would finish third in the Silver Cup points in 2018, this time getting three top-tens and two top-fives with a best result of third at the second Toledo race. In 2019, O'Leary would get his first win in the series at the season opening race at Toledo, and would finish sixth at the next round at Flat Rock before skipping the last race; he would finish eleventh in points.

After a long hiatus from the series and the team, O'Leary would return to Peterson's team for the 2024 Daytona International Speedway pre-practice. It was later revealed that he would attempt to make his first ARCA race since 2015, driving the No. 0 Ford for Wayne Peterson Racing at Daytona, although he was then placed in the No. 06 Chevrolet a few days later after the withdrawal of Con Nicolopoulos. He would finish 19th after being involved in the last lap crash.

== Motorsports results ==
=== ARCA Menards Series ===
(key) (Bold – Pole position awarded by qualifying time. Italics – Pole position earned by points standings or practice time. * – Most laps led.)

ARCA Menards Series results
Year	Team	No.	Make	1	2	3	4	5	6	7	8	9	10	11	12	13	14	15	16	17	18	19	20	AMSC	Pts	Ref
2011	Wayne Peterson Racing	06	Ford	DAY	TAL	SLM	TOL; 24	NJE	CHI; 33	POC	MCH; 32	WIN; 26	BLN; 25	IOW			ISF; 27	MAD	DSF; 27	SLM; 27	KAN; 33	TOL; 23		22nd	1190	
2011	Wayne Peterson Racing	0	Chevy												IRP; DNQ	POC								22nd	1190	
2012	Wayne Peterson Racing	31	Ford	DAY	MOB; 32	SLM; 34																		15th	2490	
2012	Wayne Peterson Racing	06	Ford				TAL; 34	TOL; DNQ	ELK; 21	POC; 23	MCH; 23	WIN; 24	NJE; 21	IOW; 34	CHI; 25	IRP; 30	POC; 27	BLN; 25			SLM; 26	DSF; C	KAN; 31	15th	2490	
2012	Carter 2 Motorsports	40	Dodge																ISF; 13					15th	2490	
2012	Wayne Peterson Racing	0	Ford																	MAD; 24				15th	2490	
2014	Carter 2 Motorsports	97	Dodge	DAY	MOB	SLM	TAL	TOL	NJE	POC	MCH; 25	ELK	WIN	CHI	IRP	POC	BLN	ISF	MAD	DSF	SLM	KEN	KAN	129th	105	
2015	Wayne Peterson Racing	0	Ford	DAY	MOB	NSH	SLM	TAL	TOL	NJE	POC	MCH; 20	CHI	WIN	IOW	IRP	POC	BLN	ISF	DSF	SLM	KEN	KAN	111th	130	
2024	Wayne Peterson Racing	06	Chevy	DAY; 19	PHO	TAL	DOV	KAN	CLT	IOW	MOH	BLN	IRP	SLM	ELK	MCH	ISF	MLW	DSF	GLN	BRI	KAN	TOL	98th	25	
