= Blake Hillard =

American racing driver

- Born: April 8, 1989 (age 37); Owensboro, Kentucky, U.S.

ARCA Menards Series career
- 9 races run over 3 years
- Best finish: 40th (2014)
- First race: 2012 Kentuckiana Ford Dealers 200 (Salem)
- Last race: 2014 Federated Car Care ARCA Fall Classic (Salem)
Wins	Top tens	Poles
0	2	0
- Statistics up to date as of January 25, 2025.

Blake Hillard (born April 8, 1989) is an American professional stock car racing driver who has previously competed in the ARCA Racing Series from 2012 to 2014.

Hillard has also competed in series such as the ASA CRA Super Series, the CRA Street Stocks Series, the CRA JEGS All-Stars Tour, and the Ken-Ten Pro Late Model Series.

== Motorsports results ==
=== ARCA Racing Series ===
(key) (Bold – Pole position awarded by qualifying time. Italics – Pole position earned by points standings or practice time. * – Most laps led.)

ARCA Racing Series results
Year	Team	No.	Make	1	2	3	4	5	6	7	8	9	10	11	12	13	14	15	16	17	18	19	20	21	ARSC	Pts	Ref
2012	Fast Track Racing	10	Chevy	DAY	MOB	SLM; 24	TAL	TOL	ELK	POC	MCH	WIN	NJE	IOW	CHI	IRP	POC	BLN	ISF	MAD					96th	180	
2012	Brett Hudson Motorsports	99	Chevy																		SLM; 32	DSF	KAN		96th	180	
2013	Blake Hillard Racing	10	Chevy	DAY	MOB	SLM; 22	TAL	TOL; 14	ELK	POC	MCH	ROA	WIN; 7	CHI	NJE	POC	BLN	ISF	MAD	DSF	IOW				45th	580	
2013	Blake Hillard Racing	1	Chevy																			SLM; 25	KEN	KAN	45th	580	
2014	Blake Hillard Racing	10	Chevy	DAY	MOB	SLM; 16	TAL	TOL	NJE	POC	MCH	ELK	WIN	CHI	IRP; 17	POC	BLN	ISF	MAD	DSF					40th	475	
2014	Blake Hillard Racing	11	Chevy																		SLM; 10	KEN	KAN		40th	475	
