= Tim Walter (racing driver) =

American racing driver

- Born: June 14, 1965 (age 61); Valparaiso, Indiana, U.S.

ARCA Menards Series career
- 5 races run over 2 years
- Best finish: 53rd (2012)
- First race: 2011 Herr's Live With Flavor! 200 (Madison)
- Last race: 2012 Kentuckiana Ford Dealers ARCA Fall Classic (Salem)
Wins	Top tens	Poles
0	0	0
- Statistics up to date as of January 24, 2025.

Tim Walter (born June 14, 1965) is an American professional stock car racing driver who has previously competed in the ARCA Racing Series from 2011 to 2012.

Walter has also competed in the Renegades of Dirt Modified Tour.

== Motorsports results ==
=== ARCA Racing Series ===
(key) (Bold – Pole position awarded by qualifying time. Italics – Pole position earned by points standings or practice time. * – Most laps led.)

ARCA Racing Series results
Year	Team	No.	Make	1	2	3	4	5	6	7	8	9	10	11	12	13	14	15	16	17	18	19	20	ARSC	Pts	Ref
2011	Tim Walter	86	Dodge	DAY	TAL	SLM	TOL	NJE	CHI	POC	MCH	WIN	BLN	IOW	IRP; DNQ	POC	ISF							76th	265	
2011	Tim Walter	94	Dodge															MAD; 21	DSF					76th	265	
2011	Tim Walter	39	Dodge																	SLM; 28	KAN			76th	265	
2011	Roulo Brothers Racing	39	Dodge																			TOL; DNQ		76th	265	
2012	Tim Walter	86	Dodge	DAY	MOB	SLM	TAL	TOL	ELK	POC	MCH	WIN	NJE	IOW	CHI	IRP; DNQ	POC							53rd	415	
2012	Hixson Motorsports	3	Dodge															BLN; 20	ISF					53rd	415	
2012	Hixson Motorsports	2	Dodge																	MAD; 21	SLM; 19	DSF	KAN	53rd	415	
