= Shane Cockrum =

American racing driver

- Born: November 13, 1981 (age 44); Benton, Illinois, U.S.

ARCA Menards Series career
- 6 races run over 4 years
- Best finish: 7th (2014)
- First race: 2012 Allen Crowe 100 (Springfield)
- Last race: 2015 Southern Illinois 100 (DuQuoin)
Wins	Top tens	Poles
0	2	0
- Statistics up to date as of February 11, 2025.

Shane Cockrum (born November 13, 1981) is an American professional auto racing driver who competes in the USAC Sprint and Silver Crown Series, and has previously competed in the ARCA Racing Series from 2012 to 2015.

Cockrum has also competed in series such as the USAC Silver Crown Series, where he is a five-time winner including two-time winner of the Ted Horn 100 at the DuQuoin State Fairgrounds. He has visited victory lane at some of the most storied dirt tracks in America including the Illinois State Fairgrounds Springfield Mile, the Terre Haute Action Track and Williams Grove Speedway. He regularly competes in the USAC Sprint Car National Championship, the Xtreme Outlaw Sprint Car Series, where he was the 2022 National Champion, and the POWRi Lucas Oil National Midget Series.

== Motorsports results ==
=== ARCA Racing Series ===
(key) (Bold – Pole position awarded by qualifying time. Italics – Pole position earned by points standings or practice time. * – Most laps led.)

ARCA Racing Series results
Year	Team	No.	Make	1	2	3	4	5	6	7	8	9	10	11	12	13	14	15	16	17	18	19	20	21	ARSC	Pts	Ref
2012	Brad Hill Racing	71	Ford	DAY	MOB	SLM	TAL	TOL	ELK	POC	MCH	WIN	NJE	IOW	CHI	IRP	POC	BLN	ISF; 15	MAD	SLM	DSF; C	KAN		105th	155	
2013	Brad Hill Racing	71	Ford	DAY	MOB	SLM	TAL	TOL	ELK	POC	MCH	ROA	WIN	CHI	NJE	POC	BLN	ISF; 8	MAD	DSF; 22	IOW	SLM	KEN	KAN	76th	310	
2014	Brad Hill Racing	71	Ford	DAY	MOB	SLM	TAL	TOL	NJE	POC	MCH	ELK	WIN	CHI	IRP	POC	BLN	ISF; 9	MAD	DSF; 22	SLM	KEN	KAN		55th	305	
2015	Brad Hill Racing	71	Ford	DAY	MOB	NSH	SLM	TAL	TOL	NJE	POC	MCH	CHI	WIN	IOW	IRP	POC	BLN	ISF	DSF; 22	SLM	KEN	KAN		118th	120	
