= Jared Marks =

American racing driver

- Born: May 28, 1994 (age 32); Napoleon, Ohio, U.S.

ARCA Menards Series career
- 20 races run over 3 years
- Best finish: 16th (2012)
- First race: 2011 Menards 200 presented by Federated Car Care (Toledo)
- Last race: 2014 Lucas Oil 200 (Daytona)
Wins	Top tens	Poles
0	7	0
- Statistics up to date as of July 7, 2023.

Jared Marks (born May 28, 1994) is an American professional stock car racing driver who has previously competed in the ARCA Racing Series.

== Racing career ==
From 2009 to 2010, Marks competed in various racing series' like the CRA Super Series, the ASA Late Model Series, and the CRA JEGS All-Star Tour.

In 2011, after previously participated in the preseason teat at Daytona International Speedway, Marks would make his ARCA Racing Series debut at the age of sixteen at Toledo Speedway driving the No. 8 Dodge for his fathers own team, Tony Marks Racing, as a teammate to Maryeve Dufault. After starting 31st and last due to qualifying being rained out, he would go on to finish on the lead lap in thirteenth. In his next start at Winchester Speedway, he would qualify in ninth place but would finish in twelfth. He would then finish eleventh in his next start at Iowa Speedway, before finishing 30th at Lucas Oil Raceway due to bing involved in a crash with Tim George Jr. and Joey Coulter. He would make two starts in the No. 12, filling in for Dufault, where he would finish twelfth at Madison International Speedway, and fourth at the Salem Speedway before returning to the No. 8 for the season finale at Toledo, where he would finish in tenth position.

In 2012, Marks would attempt to run the full schedule (withdrawing for the events at Daytona and Talladega Superspeedway due to age restrictions), getting five top-tens in seven starts with a best finish of seventh at Pocono Raceway, and would continue to run until after the Winchester race, where he would skip the following race at New Jersey Motorsports Park before running the next three races at Iowa, Chicagoland Speedway, and Indianapolis. After that, Marks would not make another start until Salem in September, where he would finish twelfth. He would then run the final race of the season at Kansas Speedway, where he would finish eleventh on his way to finish sixteenth in the final points standings.

After not racing in the series in 2013, Marks would return to Daytona with Tony Marks Racing in the No. 12 Chevrolet with sponsorship from the University of Northwestern Ohio, where he would finish multiple laps down in 27th place. He has not competed in the series since then.

== Motorsports results ==
=== ARCA Racing Series ===
(key) (Bold – Pole position awarded by qualifying time. Italics – Pole position earned by points standings or practice time. * – Most laps led.)

ARCA Racing Series results
Year	Team	No.	Make	1	2	3	4	5	6	7	8	9	10	11	12	13	14	15	16	17	18	19	20	ARSC	Pts	Ref
2011	Tony Marks Racing	8	Dodge	DAY	TAL	SLM	TOL; 13	NJE	CHI	POC	MCH	WIN; 12	BLN	IOW; 11	IRP; 30	POC	ISF					TOL; 10		24th	1150	
2011	Tony Marks Racing	12	Dodge															MAD; 12	DSF	SLM; 4	KAN			24th	1150	
2012	Tony Marks Racing	8	Dodge	DAY; Wth																				16th	2240	
2012	Tony Marks Racing	12	Dodge		MOB; 8	SLM; 16	TAL; Wth	TOL; 10	ELK; 10	POC; 7	MCH; 16	WIN; 9	NJE	IOW; 25	CHI; 13	IRP; 29	POC	BLN	ISF	MAD	SLM; 12	DSF	KAN; 11	16th	2240	
2014	Tony Marks Racing	12	Chevy	DAY; 27	MOB	SLM	TAL	TOL	NJE	POC	MCH	ELK	WIN	CHI	IRP	POC	BLN	ISF	MAD	DSF	SLM	KEN	KAN	133rd	95	
