= Mike Buckley =

American racing driver

- Born: October 15, 1963 (age 63); Ann Arbor, Michigan, U.S.

ARCA Menards Series career
- 156 races run over 20 years
- Best finish: 10th (2001)
- First race: 1994 Greater Des Moines Ruan Grand Prix (Des Moines)
- Last race: 2015 Corrigan Oil 200 (Michigan)
Wins	Top tens	Poles
0	12	0
- Statistics up to date as of July 13, 2023.

Mike Buckley (born October 15, 1963) is an American former professional stock car racing driver who has previously competed in the ARCA Racing Series.

== Racing career ==
In 1994, Buckley made his ARCA Hooters SuperCar Series debut at the Des Moines Street Course, driving the No. 48 Pontiac for his own team, where he would start 33rd and finish 22nd due to an oil leak in the car. He would make five more starts that year, getting a best finish of nineteenth at the Indiana State Fairgrounds dirt track. He would then make select starts in the No. 48 for the next four seasons, getting a total of five top-tens across those four years with a best result of sixth and Shady Bowl Speedway in 1995.

In 1999, Buckley would move over to the No. 28, switching from a Pontiac to a Chevrolet, where he would enter ten races that year, failing to qualify for four of those events and getting a best finish of tenth at Winchester Speedway. For the following year, he would fail to qualify for the season opening race at Daytona International Speedway before making five starts that year with a best finish of fourteenth at Kil-Kare Speedway.

In 2001, Buckley competed in all but five races that year, getting two top-tens with a best finish of fifth at Toledo Speedway on his way to finish tenth in the final points standings. He would then run the full schedule the following year in 2002, where he would once again get two top-tens with a best finish of sixth at Winchester, and would finish thirteenth in the points standings. In 2003, he would only get one top-ten at Winchester to finish twelfth in the final points standings, and would get no top-tens the following year to once again finish in twelfth in the standings.

In 2005, Buckley entered in only five races, failing to qualify for four of those races and finishing 25th at Pocono Raceway due to transmission issues. He would enter in five more races the following year in 2006, this time running in a Pontiac, where he would only fail to qualify for one of those races and getting a best finish of fourteenth at the Milwaukee Mile. In 2007, he would only compete in two races, finishing ninth at Toledo and 25th at Milwaukee due to overheating issues.

After not competing in the series for two more years, Buckley returned in 2010 at Michigan International Speedway, driving the No. 96 Ford for Brad Smith Motorsports, where he would finish 40th after running only three laps due to battery issues. After spending the next year on the sidelines, he would return to Michigan in 2012, this time driving his self owned No. 3 Chevrolet, where he would start 27th and finish nine laps down in twentieth. He would race at Michigan again the following year, this time returning to the No. 28, where he would in twelfth, and would run at Chicagoland Speedway, where he would finish 21st due to an axle issue. In 2014, Buckley ran three races, finishing seventeenth at Toledo despite spinning early in the race, and would finish nineteenth and 23rd at Michigan and Kentucky Speedway respectively. It was also during this year that he would run two races in the ARCA Truck Series, where he would get a best finish of ninth at Flat Rock Speedway due to handling issues. For the following year in 2015, he would once again return to Michigan in the No. 28 Chevrolet, where he would finish twelfth, six laps down to race winner Ross Kenseth, and would two more starts in the ARCA trucks, getting a best finish of sixth at Angola Motorsports Speedway. The Angola race would be his most recent start as a driver, as he has not competed in any racing series since then.

== Motorsports results ==
=== ARCA Racing Series ===
(key) (Bold – Pole position awarded by qualifying time. Italics – Pole position earned by points standings or practice time. * – Most laps led.)

ARCA Racing Series results
Year	Team	No.	Make	1	2	3	4	5	6	7	8	9	10	11	12	13	14	15	16	17	18	19	20	21	22	23	24	25	ARSC	Pts	Ref
1994	Mike Buckley Racing	48	Pontiac	DAY	TAL	FIF	LVL	KIL	TOL	FRS	MCH	DMS; 22	POC	POC	KIL; 24	FRS	INF; 19	I70	ISF; 30	DSF; 24	TOL	SLM	WIN	ATL					N/A	0	
1995	Mike Buckley Racing	48	Pontiac	DAY	ATL	TAL	FIF	KIL; 18	FRS; 19	MCH	I80; 33	MCS; 23	FRS; 17	POC	POC	KIL; 16	FRS; 21	SBS; 6	LVL; 26	ISF; 30	DSF; 14	SLM; 22	WIN; 27	ATL					20th	1860	
1996	Mike Buckley Racing	48	Pontiac	DAY	ATL	SLM; 15	TAL	FIF; 14	LVL; 20	CLT	CLT	KIL; DNQ	FRS; 14	POC	MCH	FRS; 14	TOL; 21	POC	MCH	INF; 19	SBS; 9	ISF; 15	DSF; 29	KIL; 19	SLM; 31	WIN; 26	CLT	ATL	16th	1715	
1997	Mike Buckley Racing	48	Pontiac	DAY; DNQ	ATL; 25	SLM; 9	CLT; Wth	CLT	POC	MCH	SBS; 8	TOL; 19	KIL; 25	FRS; 11	MIN; 17	POC	MCH	DSF; 36	GTW	SLM; 17	WIN; 22	CLT	TAL	ISF; 32	ATL				N/A	0	
1998	Mike Buckley Racing	48	Pontiac	DAY	ATL	SLM	CLT	MEM; 22	MCH	POC	SBS; 9	TOL; 25	PPR	POC	KIL; 13	FRS; 15	ISF; DNQ	ATL	DSF; 32	SLM	TEX	WIN; DNQ	CLT	TAL	ATL				N/A	0	
1999	Mike Buckley Racing	28	Pontiac	DAY	ATL	SLM; 27	AND; DNQ	CLT																					35th	965	
1999	Mike Buckley Racing	28	Chevy						MCH; DNQ	POC	TOL	SBS	BLN; 20	POC	KIL; 11	FRS; 11	FLM; DNQ	ISF; DNQ	WIN; 10	DSF	SLM; 20	CLT	TAL	ATL					35th	965	
2000	Mike Buckley Racing	28	Chevy	DAY; DNQ	SLM; 22	AND	CLT	KIL; 14	FRS; 19	MCH	POC	TOL; 22	KEN	BLN; 18	POC	WIN	ISF	KEN	DSF	SLM	CLT	TAL	ATL						44th	700	
2001	Mike Buckley Racing	28	Chevy	DAY; DNQ	NSH; 20	WIN; 19	SLM; 20	GTY; 25	KEN	CLT	KAN; 15	MCH; 15	POC	MEM; 7	GLN; 14	KEN	MCH; 36	POC	NSH; 15	ISF; 11	CHI; 14	DSF; 18	SLM; 11	TOL; 5	BLN; 27	CLT; 15	TAL; 12	ATL; 41	10th	3470	
2002	Mike Buckley Racing	28	Chevy	DAY; 11	ATL; 22	NSH; 30	SLM; 9	KEN; 21	CLT; 17	KAN; 31	POC; 32	MCH; 26	TOL; 26	SBO; 21	KEN; 30	BLN; 26	POC; 40	NSH; 27	ISF; 38	WIN; 6	DSF; 20	CHI; 11	SLM; 15	TAL; 28	CLT; 27				13th	3740	
2003	Mike Buckley Racing	28	Chevy	DAY; 26	ATL; 17	NSH; 21	SLM; 13	TOL; 13	KEN; 24	CLT; 38	BLN; 18	KAN; 13	MCH; 25	LER; 21	POC; 19	POC; 14	NSH; 18	ISF; 17	WIN; 7	DSF; 19	CHI; 15	SLM; 30	TAL; 14	CLT; 40	SBO; 26				12th	4105	
2004	Mike Buckley Racing	28	Chevy	DAY; 19	NSH; 14	SLM; 17	KEN; 13	TOL; 11	CLT; 15	KAN; 35	POC; 24	MCH; 22	SBO; 18	BLN; 24	KEN; 22	GTW; 12	POC; 12	LER; 18	NSH; 19	ISF; 21	TOL; 33	DSF; 26	CHI; 18	SLM; 11	TAL; 15				12th	4215	
2005	Mike Buckley Racing	28	Chevy	DAY	NSH	SLM; DNQ	KEN	TOL	LAN	MIL	POC	MCH; DNQ	KAN	KEN; DNQ	BLN; DNQ	POC; 25	GTW	LER	NSH	MCH	ISF	TOL	DSF	CHI	SLM	TAL			102nd	230	
2006	Mike Buckley Racing	28	Pontiac	DAY	NSH	SLM	WIN	KEN	TOL; DNQ	POC	MCH; 26	KAN	KEN	BLN	POC	GTW	NSH	MCH; 22	ISF	MIL; 14	TOL; 29	DSF	CHI	SLM	TAL	IOW			67th	490	
2007	Mike Buckley Racing	28	Pontiac	DAY	USA	NSH	SLM	KAN	WIN	KEN	TOL; 9	IOW	POC	MCH	BLN	KEN	POC	NSH	ISF	MIL; 25	GTW	DSF	CHI	SLM	TAL	TOL			86th	290	
2010	Brad Smith Motorsports	96	Ford	DAY	PBE	SLM	TEX	TAL	TOL	POC	MCH; 40	IOW	MFD	POC	BLN	NJE	ISF	CHI	DSF	TOL	SLM	KAN	CAR						138th	30	
2012	Mike Buckley Racing	3	Chevy	DAY	MOB	SLM	TAL	TOL	ELK	POC	MCH; 20	WIN	NJE	IOW	CHI	IRP	POC	BLN	ISF	MAD	SLM	DSF	KAN						115th	130	
2013	Mike Buckley Racing	28	Chevy	DAY	MOB	SLM	TAL	TOL	ELK	POC	MCH; 13	ROA	WIN	CHI; 21	NJM	POC	BLN	ISF	MAD	DSF	IOW	SLM	KEN	KAN					81st	290	
2014	Mike Buckley Racing	28	Chevy	DAY	MOB	SLM	TAL	TOL; 17	NJE	POC	MCH; 18	ELK	WIN	CHI	IRP	POC	BLN	ISF	MAD	DSF	SLM	KEN; 23	KAN						42nd	400	
2015	Mike Buckley Racing	28	Chevy	DAY	MOB	NSH	SLM	TAL	TOL	NJE	POC	MCH; 12	CHI	WIN	IOW	IRP	POC	BLN	ISF	DSF	SLM	KEN	KAN						102nd	170	
