= Austin Rettig =

American racing driver

- Born: June 10, 1994 (age 32); Sikeston, Missouri, U.S.

ARCA Menards Series career
- 10 races run over 3 years
- Best finish: 32nd (2012)
- First race: 2011 Southern Illinois 100 (DuQuoin)
- Last race: 2013 ZLOOP 150 (Kentucky)
Wins	Top tens	Poles
0	1	0
- Statistics up to date as of January 20, 2025.

Austin Rettig (born June 10, 1994) is an American professional stock car racing driver who has competed in the ARCA Racing Series from 2011 to 2013.

Rettig has also competed in series such as the DIRTcar Summit Racing Equipment Modified Nationals, the Lucas Oil Late Model Dirt Series, the MARS Racing Series, and the COMP Cams Super Dirt Series.

== Motorsports results ==
=== ARCA Racing Series ===
(key) (Bold – Pole position awarded by qualifying time. Italics – Pole position earned by points standings or practice time. * – Most laps led.)

ARCA Racing Series results
Year	Team	No.	Make	1	2	3	4	5	6	7	8	9	10	11	12	13	14	15	16	17	18	19	20	21	ARSC	Pts	Ref
2011	Rettig Racing	01	Dodge	DAY	TAL	SLM	TOL	NJE	CHI	POC	MCH	WIN	BLN	IOW	IRP; DNQ	POC	ISF	MAD	DSF; 34	SLM	KAN	TOL; DNQ			138th	110	
2012	Rettig Racing	01	Dodge	DAY	MOB; DNQ	SLM; 18	TAL	TOL; 21	ELK	POC	MCH	WIN; 13	NJE	IOW	CHI	IRP; 20	POC	BLN	ISF; 9	MAD	SLM	DSF; C	KAN		32nd	770	
2013	Kimmel Racing	67	Ford	DAY	MOB	SLM	TAL	TOL	ELK	POC	MCH; 22	ROA	WIN	CHI	NJM	POC	BLN								57th	475	
2013	Rettig Racing	01	Dodge															ISF; 19	MAD	DSF; 18	IOW	SLM			57th	475	
2013	Kimmel Racing	68	Ford																				KEN; 30	KAN	57th	475	
