= 2018 Go Bowling 250 =

27th race of the 2018 NASCAR Xfinity Series

Race details
- Race 27 of 33 in the 2018 NASCAR Xfinity Series season
- Date: September 21, 2018
- Location: Richmond Raceway in Richmond, Virginia
- Course: Permanent racing facility
- Course length: .75 miles (1.2 km)
- Distance: 250 laps, 187.5 mi (300 km)
- Average speed: 91.364 miles per hour (147.036 km/h)

Pole position
Driver	Christopher Bell	Joe Gibbs Racing
- Time: 22.691

Most laps led
Driver	Dale Earnhardt Jr.	JR Motorsports
- Laps: 96

Winner
No. 20	Christopher Bell	Joe Gibbs Racing

Television in the United States
- Network: NBCSN

Radio in the United States
- Radio: PRN

The 2018 Go Bowling 250 was a NASCAR Xfinity Series race held on September 21, 2018 at Richmond Raceway in Richmond, Virginia. Contested over 250 laps on the .75-mile (1.21 km) D-shaped short track, it was the 27th race of the 2018 NASCAR Xfinity Series season, and the first race of the Playoffs.

== Entry list ==
No.	Driver	Team	Manufacturer
0	Garrett Smithley	JD Motorsports	Chevrolet
00	Cole Custer	Stewart-Haas Racing with Biagi-DenBeste Racing	Ford
01	Vinnie Miller (R)	JD Motorsports	Chevrolet
1	Elliott Sadler	JR Motorsports	Chevrolet
2	Matt Tifft	Richard Childress Racing	Chevrolet
3	Shane Lee	Richard Childress Racing	Chevrolet
4	Quin Houff	JD Motorsports	Chevrolet
5	Michael Annett	JR Motorsports	Chevrolet
7	Justin Allgaier	JR Motorsports	Chevrolet
8	Ray Black Jr.	B. J. McLeod Motorsports	Chevrolet
9	Tyler Reddick (R)	JR Motorsports	Chevrolet
11	Ryan Truex	Kaulig Racing	Chevrolet
13	Timmy Hill	MBM Motorsports	Toyota
15	Katherine Legge	JD Motorsports	Chevrolet
16	Ryan Reed	Roush Fenway Racing	Ford
18	Ryan Preece	Joe Gibbs Racing	Toyota
19	Brandon Jones	Joe Gibbs Racing	Toyota
20	Christopher Bell (R)	Joe Gibbs Racing	Toyota
21	Daniel Hemric	Richard Childress Racing	Chevrolet
22	Austin Cindric (R)	Team Penske	Ford
23	Spencer Gallagher	GMS Racing	Chevrolet
27	Cody Lane	Cody Lane Racing	Chevrolet
35	Joey Gase	Go Green Racing	Chevrolet
36	Alex Labbé (R)	DGM Racing	Chevrolet
38	J. J. Yeley	RSS Racing	Chevrolet
39	Ryan Sieg	RSS Racing	Chevrolet
40	Chad Finchum (R)	MBM Motorsports	Toyota
42	Ross Chastain	Chip Ganassi Racing	Chevrolet
45	Josh Bilicki (R)	JP Motorsports	Toyota
51	Jeremy Clements	Jeremy Clements Racing	Chevrolet
52	David Starr	Jimmy Means Racing	Chevrolet
55	Bayley Currey (i)	JP Motorsports	Toyota
60	Ty Majeski	Roush Fenway Racing	Ford
66	Carl Long	MBM Motorsports	Dodge
74	Mike Harmon	Mike Harmon Racing	Chevrolet
76	Spencer Boyd (R)	SS-Green Light Racing	Chevrolet
78	Matt Mills (R)	B. J. McLeod Motorsports	Chevrolet
88	Dale Earnhardt Jr.	JR Motorsports	Chevrolet
89	Morgan Shepherd	Shepherd Racing Ventures	Chevrolet
90	Mason Diaz	DGM Racing	Chevrolet
93	Jeff Green	RSS Racing	Chevrolet

== Practice ==
=== First practice ===
Christopher Bell was the fastest in the first practice session with a time of 22.341 seconds and a speed of 120.854 mph (194.496 km/h).

Pos	No.	Driver	Team	Manufacturer	Time	Speed
1	20	Christopher Bell (R)	Joe Gibbs Racing	Toyota	22.341	120.854
2	00	Cole Custer	Stewart-Haas Racing with Biagi-DenBeste Racing	Ford	22.373	120.681
3	19	Brandon Jones	Joe Gibbs Racing	Toyota	22.414	120.460

=== Final practice ===
Cole Custer was the fastest in the final practice session with a time of 22.538 seconds and a speed of 119.798 mph (192.796 km/h).

Pos	No.	Driver	Team	Manufacturer	Time	Speed
1	00	Cole Custer	Stewart-Haas Racing with Biagi-DenBeste Racing	Ford	22.538	119.798
2	21	Daniel Hemric	Richard Childress Racing	Chevrolet	22.568	119.638
3	42	Ross Chastain	Chip Ganassi Racing	Chevrolet	22.745	118.707

== Qualifying ==
Christopher Bell scored the pole for the race with a time of 22.691 seconds and a speed of 118.990 mph (191.496 km/h).

=== Qualifying results ===
Pos	No.	Driver	Team	Manufacturer	Time	Speed
1	20	Christopher Bell (R)	Joe Gibbs Racing	Toyota	22.691	118.990
2	88	Dale Earnhardt Jr.	JR Motorsports	Chevrolet	22.709	118.896
3	42	Ross Chastain	Chip Ganassi Racing	Chevrolet	22.750	118.681
4	00	Cole Custer	Stewart-Haas Racing with Biagi-DenBeste Racing	Ford	22.755	118.655
5	7	Justin Allgaier	JR Motorsports	Chevrolet	22.783	118.509
6	21	Daniel Hemric	Richard Childress Racing	Chevrolet	22.792	118.463
7	11	Ryan Truex	Kaulig Racing	Chevrolet	22.838	118.224
8	3	Shane Lee	Richard Childress Racing	Chevrolet	22.851	118.157
9	19	Brandon Jones	Joe Gibbs Racing	Toyota	22.887	117.971
10	2	Matt Tifft	Richard Childress Racing	Chevrolet	22.919	117.806
11	22	Austin Cindric (R)	Team Penske	Ford	22.933	117.734
12	18	Ryan Preece	Joe Gibbs Racing	Toyota	22.985	117.468
13	1	Elliott Sadler	JR Motorsports	Chevrolet	22.964	117.575
14	9	Tyler Reddick (R)	JR Motorsports	Chevrolet	22.989	117.447
15	60	Ty Majeski	Roush Fenway Racing	Ford	22.992	117.432
16	23	Spencer Gallagher	GMS Racing	Chevrolet	23.018	117.300
17	5	Michael Annett	JR Motorsports	Chevrolet	23.054	117.116
18	39	Ryan Sieg	RSS Racing	Chevrolet	23.163	116.565
19	36	Alex Labbé (R)	DGM Racing	Chevrolet	23.168	116.540
20	51	Jeremy Clements	Jeremy Clements Racing	Chevrolet	23.197	116.394
21	16	Ryan Reed	Roush Fenway Racing	Ford	23.218	116.289
22	90	Mason Diaz	DGM Racing	Chevrolet	23.229	116.234
23	35	Joey Gase	Go Green Racing	Chevrolet	23.320	115.780
24	4	Quin Houff	JD Motorsports	Chevrolet	N/A	115.622
25	78	Matt Mills (R)	B. J. McLeod Motorsports	Chevrolet	23.356	115.602
26	8	Ray Black Jr.	B. J. McLeod Motorsports	Chevrolet	23.356	115.602
27	52	David Starr	Jimmy Means Racing	Chevrolet	23.376	115.503
28	38	J. J. Yeley	RSS Racing	Chevrolet	23.409	115.340
29	0	Garrett Smithley	JD Motorsports	Chevrolet	23.501	114.889
30	76	Spencer Boyd (R)	SS-Green Light Racing	Chevrolet	23.543	114.684
31	55	Bayley Currey (i)	JP Motorsports	Toyota	23.575	114.528
32	15	Katherine Legge	JD Motorsports	Chevrolet	23.675	114.044
33	89	Morgan Shepherd	Shepherd Racing Ventures	Chevrolet	23.686	113.991
34	40	Chad Finchum (R)	MBM Motorsports	Toyota	23.732	113.770
35	93	Jeff Green	RSS Racing	Chevrolet	23.811	113.393
36	13	Timmy Hill	MBM Motorsports	Toyota	23.819	113.355
37	01	Vinnie Miller (R)	JD Motorsports	Chevrolet	23.858	113.170
38	74	Mike Harmon	Mike Harmon Racing	Chevrolet	24.080	112.126
39	45	Josh Bilicki (R)	JP Motorsports	Toyota	24.123	111.926
40	66	Carl Long	MBM Motorsports	Dodge	24.650	109.533
Withdrew						
41	27	Cody Lane	Cody Lane Racing	Chevrolet		0.000

== Race ==
=== Stage Results ===
Stage 1

Pos	No	Driver	Team	Manufacturer	Points
1	21	Daniel Hemric	Richard Childress Racing	Chevrolet	10
2	20	Christopher Bell (R)	Joe Gibbs Racing	Toyota	9
3	88	Dale Earnhardt Jr.	JR Motorsports	Chevrolet	8
4	2	Matt Tifft	Richard Childress Racing	Chevrolet	7
5	7	Justin Allgaier	JR Motorsports	Chevrolet	6
6	1	Elliott Sadler	JR Motorsports	Chevrolet	5
7	11	Ryan Truex	Kaulig Racing	Chevrolet	4
8	9	Tyler Reddick (R)	JR Motorsports	Chevrolet	3
9	22	Austin Cindric (R)	Team Penske	Ford	2
10	42	Ross Chastain	Chip Ganassi Racing	Chevrolet	1

Stage 2

Pos	No	Driver	Team	Manufacturer	Points
1	88	Dale Earnhardt Jr.	JR Motorsports	Chevrolet	10
2	20	Christopher Bell (R)	Joe Gibbs Racing	Toyota	9
3	21	Daniel Hemric	Richard Childress Racing	Chevrolet	8
4	42	Ross Chastain	Chip Ganassi Racing	Chevrolet	7
5	7	Justin Allgaier	JR Motorsports	Chevrolet	6
6	2	Matt Tifft	Richard Childress Racing	Chevrolet	5
7	1	Elliott Sadler	JR Motorsports	Chevrolet	4
8	9	Tyler Reddick (R)	JR Motorsports	Chevrolet	3
9	00	Cole Custer	Stewart-Haas Racing with Biagi-DenBeste	Ford	2
10	22	Austin Cindric (R)	Team Penske	Ford	1

=== Final Stage Results ===
Stage 3

Pos	Grid	No	Driver	Team	Manufacturer	Laps	Led	Status	Points
1	1	20	Christopher Bell (R)	Joe Gibbs Racing	Toyota	250	67	Running	58
2	3	42	Ross Chastain	Chip Ganassi Racing	Chevrolet	250	0	Running	43
3	6	21	Daniel Hemric	Richard Childress Racing	Chevrolet	250	35	Running	52
4	2	88	Dale Earnhardt Jr.	JR Motorsports	Chevrolet	250	96	Running	51
5	10	2	Matt Tifft	Richard Childress Racing	Chevrolet	250	15	Running	44
6	13	1	Elliott Sadler	JR Motorsports	Chevrolet	250	0	Running	40
7	14	9	Tyler Reddick (R)	JR Motorsports	Chevrolet	250	0	Running	36
8	9	19	Brandon Jones	Joe Gibbs Racing	Toyota	250	0	Running	29
9	8	3	Shane Lee	Richard Childress Racing	Chevrolet	250	0	Running	28
10	21	16	Ryan Reed	Roush Fenway Racing	Ford	250	0	Running	27
11	7	11	Ryan Truex	Kaulig Racing	Chevrolet	250	0	Running	30
12	16	23	Spencer Gallagher	GMS Racing	Chevrolet	250	0	Running	25
13	11	22	Austin Cindric (R)	Team Penske	Ford	250	0	Running	27
14	17	5	Michael Annett	JR Motorsports	Chevrolet	250	0	Running	23
15	4	00	Cole Custer	Stewart-Haas Racing with Biagi-DenBeste	Ford	250	0	Running	24
16	20	51	Jeremy Clements	Jeremy Clements Racing	Chevrolet	250	0	Running	21
17	18	39	Ryan Sieg	RSS Racing	Chevrolet	250	0	Running	20
18	12	18	Ryan Preece	Joe Gibbs Racing	Toyota	250	0	Running	19
19	22	90	Mason Diaz	DGM Racing	Chevrolet	250	0	Running	18
20	27	52	David Starr	Jimmy Means Racing	Chevrolet	249	0	Running	17
21	19	36	Alex Labbé (R)	DGM Racing	Chevrolet	248	0	Running	16
22	23	35	Joey Gase	Go Green Racing	Chevrolet	248	0	Running	15
23	26	8	Ray Black Jr.	B. J. McLeod Motorsports	Chevrolet	248	0	Running	14
24	29	0	Garrett Smithley	JD Motorsports	Chevrolet	248	0	Running	13
25	28	38	J. J. Yeley	RSS Racing	Chevrolet	246	0	Running	12
26	34	40	Chad Finchum (R)	MBM Motorsports	Toyota	245	0	Running	11
27	25	78	Matt Mills (R)	B. J. McLeod Motorsports	Chevrolet	244	0	Running	10
28	22	15	Katherine Legge	JD Motorsports	Chevrolet	242	0	Running	9
29	31	55	Bayley Currey (i)	JP Motorsports	Toyota	242	0	Running	0
30	39	45	Josh Bilicki (R)	JP Motorsports	Toyota	242	0	Running	7
31	24	4	Quin Houff	JD Motorsports	Chevrolet	231	0	Running	6
32	5	7	Justin Allgaier	JR Motorsports	Chevrolet	226	37	Crash	17
33	30	76	Spencer Boyd (R)	SS-Green Light Racing	Chevrolet	160	0	Crash	4
34	15	60	Ty Majeski	Roush Fenway Racing	Ford	145	0	Crash	3
35	38	74	Mike Harmon	Mike Harmon Racing	Chevrolet	122	0	Overheating	2
36	40	66	Carl Long	MBM Motorsports	Dodge	98	0	Overheating	1
37	37	01	Vinnie Miller (R)	JD Motorsports	Chevrolet	91	0	Engine	1
38	36	13	Timmy Hill	MBM Motorsports	Toyota	85	0	Electrical	1
39	35	93	Jeff Green	RSS Racing	Chevrolet	28	0	Vibration	1
40	33	89	Morgan Shepherd	Shepherd Racing Ventures	Chevrolet	22	0	Handling	1

Previous race: 2018 DC Solar 300	NASCAR Xfinity Series; 2018 season	Next race: 2018 Drive for the Cure 200
