= 2012 ARCA Racing Series =

Racing series

Seasons
- ← 2011 2013 →

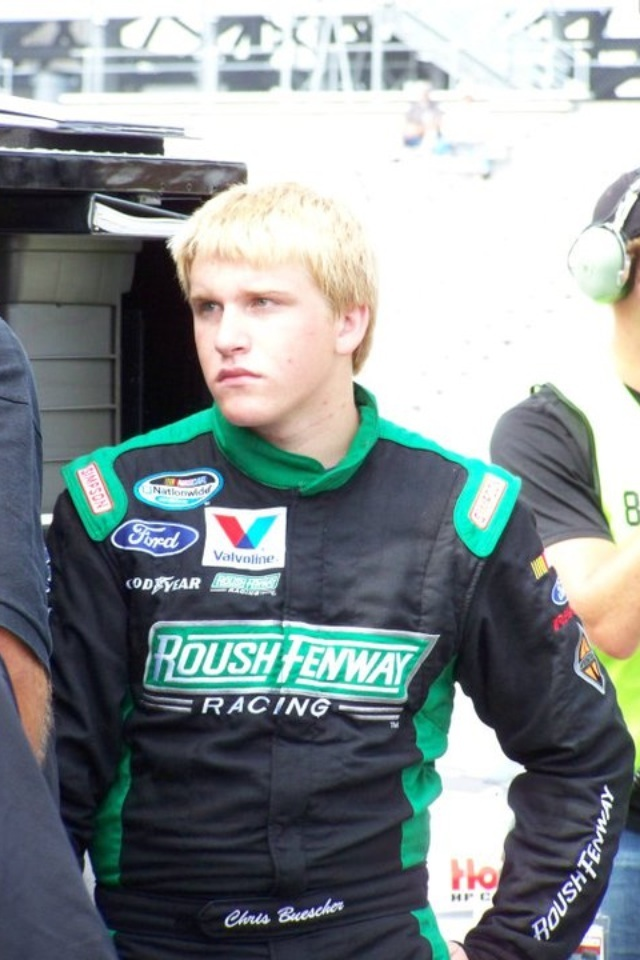
Chris Buescher, the 2012 ARCA champion.

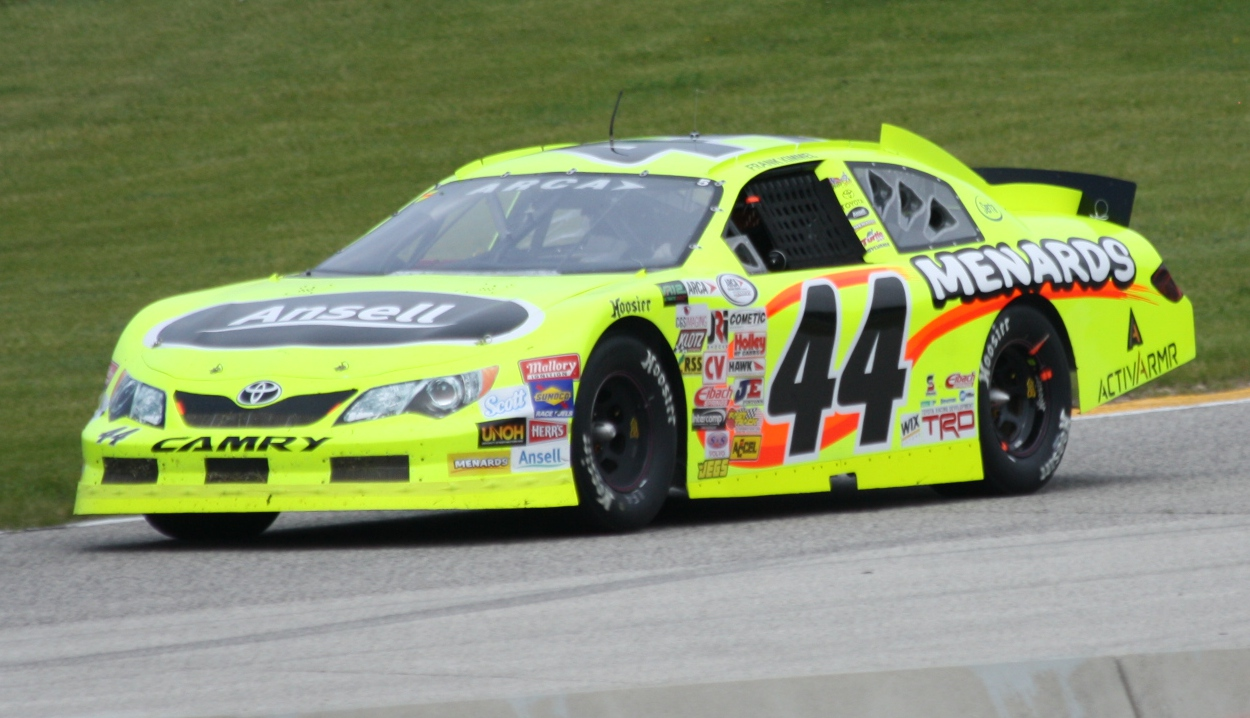
Frank Kimmel, driving the No. 44 car for ThorSport Racing, finished second behind Buescher in the championship by 75 points.

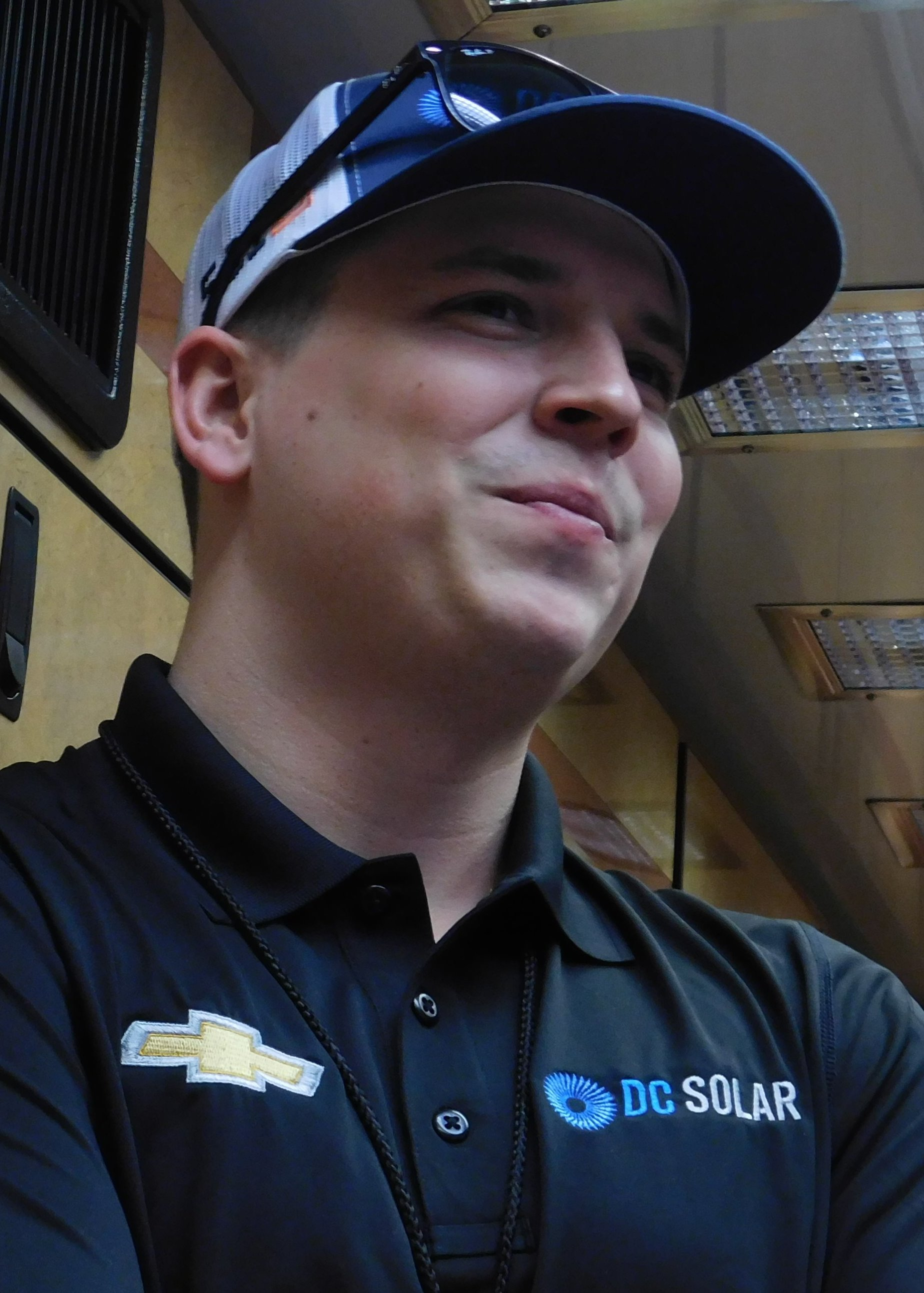
Brennan Poole finished third in the championship.

The 2012 ARCA Racing Series presented by Menards was the 60th season of the ARCA Racing Series. The season began on February 18 with the Lucas Oil Slick Mist 200 and ended on October 19 with the Kansas ARCA 150. Chris Buescher won the championship over Frank Kimmel by 75 points after a heated battle. Alex Bowman was named Rookie of the Year after battling Brennan Poole all season.

== Teams and drivers ==
=== Complete schedule ===
Manufacturer	Team	No.	Driver
Chevrolet	CGH Motorsports	58	Chad Hackenbracht
Chevrolet	Clark-Diederich Racing 12; Gallagher Motorsports 7	23	Spencer Gallagher
Chevrolet	Coulter Motorsports	16	Matt Lofton
Chevrolet	Darrell Basham Racing	34	Darrell Basham (Note: Brad Lloyd qualified the No. 34 for the race at Mobile, as Darrell Basham was ill.)
Dodge	Carter 2 Motorsports	04	Larry Barford Jr. 14
Dodge	Carter 2 Motorsports	04	Darren Hagen 2
Dodge	Carter 2 Motorsports	04	Dominick Casola 1
Dodge	Carter 2 Motorsports	04	Maryeve Dufault 2
Dodge	Carter 2 Motorsports	40	Donnie Neuenberger 1
Dodge	Carter 2 Motorsports	40	Daryl Eustace 1
Dodge	Carter 2 Motorsports	40	Nick Tucker 2
Dodge	Carter 2 Motorsports	40	Gregg Hutto Jr. 1
Dodge	Carter 2 Motorsports	40	Ryan Rust 1
Dodge	Carter 2 Motorsports	40	Lucas Munroe 1 (Note: At Elko (Race #6), Lucas Munroe was in the entry list and practiced the car. However, he was replaced by Nick Tucker in the race.)
Dodge	Carter 2 Motorsports	40	Roger Carter 6
Dodge	Carter 2 Motorsports	40	Darren Hagen 1
Dodge	Carter 2 Motorsports	40	Maryeve Dufault 1
Dodge	Carter 2 Motorsports	40	Justin Lloyd 1
Dodge	Carter 2 Motorsports	40	Tommy O'Leary IV 1
Dodge	Carter 2 Motorsports	40	Dominick Casola 1
Dodge	Carter 2 Motorsports	40	Evan Pardo 2
Dodge	Cunningham Motorsports	22	Alex Bowman
Ford	Hylton Motorsports	48	James Hylton
Ford	Kimmel Racing	68	Will Kimmel 15
Ford	Kimmel Racing	68	Korbin Forrister 2
Ford	Kimmel Racing	68	Brian Campbell 1
Ford	Kimmel Racing	68	Brad Lloyd 1
Ford	Roulo Brothers Racing	17	Chris Buescher
Ford	Wayne Peterson Racing	06	Jeremy Petty 1
Ford	Wayne Peterson Racing	06	Wayne Peterson 3
Ford	Wayne Peterson Racing	06	Tommy O'Leary IV 14
Ford	Wayne Peterson Racing	06	James Swanson 1
Toyota	ThorSport Racing	44	Frank Kimmel
Chevrolet 11 Ford 6 Dodge 2	Fast Track Racing	10	Ed Pompa 6
Chevrolet 11 Ford 6 Dodge 2	Fast Track Racing	10	Daryl Eustace 1 (Note: After Eustace failed to qualify for the race at Mobile in his own No. 40 car, he replaced Tyler Speer in the No. 10.)
Chevrolet 11 Ford 6 Dodge 2	Fast Track Racing	10	Blake Hillard 1
Chevrolet 11 Ford 6 Dodge 2	Fast Track Racing	10	Bill Coffey 1
Chevrolet 11 Ford 6 Dodge 2	Fast Track Racing	10	Brad Lloyd 2
Chevrolet 11 Ford 6 Dodge 2	Fast Track Racing	10	Rick Clifton 4
Chevrolet 11 Ford 6 Dodge 2	Fast Track Racing	10	Richard Harriman 1
Chevrolet 11 Ford 6 Dodge 2	Fast Track Racing	10	Mike Senica 1
Chevrolet 11 Ford 6 Dodge 2	Fast Track Racing	10	Ricky Ehrgott 1
Chevrolet 11 Ford 6 Dodge 2	Fast Track Racing	10	Tyler Speer 1
Chevrolet 7 Toyota 7 Ford 5	Venturini Motorsports	15	Ryan Reed 14
Chevrolet 7 Toyota 7 Ford 5	Venturini Motorsports	15	Nelson Canache Jr. 1
Chevrolet 7 Toyota 7 Ford 5	Venturini Motorsports	15	Clint King 1
Chevrolet 7 Toyota 7 Ford 5	Venturini Motorsports	15	Steve Arpin 1
Chevrolet 7 Toyota 7 Ford 5	Venturini Motorsports	15	Caleb Armstrong 1
Chevrolet 11 Toyota 8	Venturini Motorsports	25	Brennan Poole
Toyota 7 Chevrolet 12	Venturini Motorsports	35	Nelson Canache Jr. 13
Toyota 7 Chevrolet 12	Venturini Motorsports	35	Robert Mitten 1
Toyota 7 Chevrolet 12	Venturini Motorsports	35	Tom Berte 2
Toyota 7 Chevrolet 12	Venturini Motorsports	35	Michael Simko 1
Toyota 7 Chevrolet 12	Venturini Motorsports	35	Thomas Praytor 1
Toyota 7 Chevrolet 12	Venturini Motorsports	35	John Wes Townley 1
Toyota 10 Chevrolet 9	Venturini Motorsports	55	Paulie Harraka 1
Toyota 10 Chevrolet 9	Venturini Motorsports	55	Erik Jones 10
Toyota 10 Chevrolet 9	Venturini Motorsports	55	Kevin Swindell 7
Toyota 10 Chevrolet 9	Venturini Motorsports	55	A. J. Henriksen 1
Toyota 11 Chevrolet 8	Venturini Motorsports	66	Mark Thompson 2
Toyota 11 Chevrolet 8	Venturini Motorsports	66	Clint King 4
Toyota 11 Chevrolet 8	Venturini Motorsports	66	Steve Arpin 1
Toyota 11 Chevrolet 8	Venturini Motorsports	66	A. J. Henriksen 2
Toyota 11 Chevrolet 8	Venturini Motorsports	66	John Blankenship 1
Toyota 11 Chevrolet 8	Venturini Motorsports	66	Nelson Canache Jr. 3
Toyota 11 Chevrolet 8	Venturini Motorsports	66	Kevin Swindell 1
Toyota 11 Chevrolet 8	Venturini Motorsports	66	Ryan Unzicker 1
Toyota 11 Chevrolet 8	Venturini Motorsports	66	Thomas Praytor 1
Ford 18 Chevrolet 2	Roulo Brothers Racing 16; Allgaier Motorsports 3 Brett Hudson Motorsports 1	99	Casey Roderick 1
Ford 18 Chevrolet 2	Roulo Brothers Racing 16; Allgaier Motorsports 3 Brett Hudson Motorsports 1	99	Brandon Davis 10
Ford 18 Chevrolet 2	Roulo Brothers Racing 16; Allgaier Motorsports 3 Brett Hudson Motorsports 1	99	Grant Enfinger 2 (Note: It was an Allgaier Motorsports entry using Roulo Brothers Racing's owner points.)
Ford 18 Chevrolet 2	Roulo Brothers Racing 16; Allgaier Motorsports 3 Brett Hudson Motorsports 1	99	Levi Youster 1
Ford 18 Chevrolet 2	Roulo Brothers Racing 16; Allgaier Motorsports 3 Brett Hudson Motorsports 1	99	Zach Ralston 2
Ford 18 Chevrolet 2	Roulo Brothers Racing 16; Allgaier Motorsports 3 Brett Hudson Motorsports 1	99	Mike Young 1
Ford 18 Chevrolet 2	Roulo Brothers Racing 16; Allgaier Motorsports 3 Brett Hudson Motorsports 1	99	Kelly Kovski 1 (Note: It was an Allgaier Motorsports entry using Roulo Brothers Racing's owner points.)
Ford 18 Chevrolet 2	Roulo Brothers Racing 16; Allgaier Motorsports 3 Brett Hudson Motorsports 1	99	Blake Hillard 1 (Note: It was a Brett Hudson Motorsports entry using Roulo Brothers Racing's owner points.)
Toyota 11 Chevrolet 8	Win-Tron Racing	32	Chris Windom 2
Toyota 11 Chevrolet 8	Win-Tron Racing	32	Mason Mingus 12
Toyota 11 Chevrolet 8	Win-Tron Racing	32	Brandon McReynolds 1 (Note: Entry was fielded in a collaboration with Turner Motorsports.)
Toyota 11 Chevrolet 8	Win-Tron Racing	32	Aleks Gregory 2
Toyota 11 Chevrolet 8	Win-Tron Racing	32	Bradley Riethmeyer 1
Toyota 11 Chevrolet 8	Win-Tron Racing	32	Matt Merrell 1

=== Limited schedule ===
Manufacturer	Team	No.	Driver	Rounds
Chevrolet	Bill Elliott Racing	9	Chase Elliott	6
Chevrolet	Blackburn Motorsports	94	Steve Blackburn	2
Chevrolet	Bobby Gerhart Racing	5	Bobby Gerhart	10
Chevrolet	Coulter Motorsports	61	Joey Coulter	4
Chevrolet	Coulter Motorsports	61	Aleks Gregory	2
Chevrolet	Joe Denette Motorsports	9	Max Gresham	1
Chevrolet	Hixson Motorsports	28	Mike Senica	2
Chevrolet	Hixson Motorsports	95	Mike Senica	1
Chevrolet	Hixson Motorsports	95	Angela Koch	1
Chevrolet	K&K Racing	3	Tim Turner (Note: It was a K&K Racing entry using Hixson Motorsports' owner points.)	1
Chevrolet	K&K Racing	79	Mike Koch	7
Chevrolet	Lafferty Motorsports	89	Chris Lafferty	1
Chevrolet	Lafferty Motorsports	89	Korbin Forrister	1
Chevrolet	Littleton Motorsports	5	Mark Littleton (Note: It was a Littleton Motorsports entry using Bobby Gerhart Racing's owner points.)	1
Chevrolet	Mark Gibson Racing	59	Mike Affarano	1
Chevrolet	Mike Affarano Motorsports	83	Mike Affarano	3
Chevrolet	Mike Buckley Racing	3	Mike Buckley (Note: It was a Mike Buckley Racing entry using Hixson Motorsports' owner points.)	1
Chevrolet	Motorhead Racing Company	76	John Ferrier	2
Chevrolet	Mullins Racing	5	Willie Mullins	1
Chevrolet	Nowell Racing	74	Jimmy Nowell Jr.	1
Chevrolet	Ralph Solhem Racing	00	Ed Kennedy	1
Chevrolet	Team LaCross Motorsports	7	Brent Cross	3
Chevrolet	Turner Motorsports	4	Brandon McReynolds	1
Chevrolet	Williams Motorsports	94	Ronnie Souders Jr.	3
Dodge	Brella Sports Group	3	Landon Cling (Note: It was a Brella Sports Group entry using Hixson Motorsports' owner points.)	1
Dodge	Brian Keselowski Motorsports	29	Sloan Henderson	1
Dodge	Brian Keselowski Motorsports	29	Brian Keselowski	1
Dodge	Carter 2 Motorsports	67	Michael Bockler	1
Dodge	Carter 2 Motorsports	67	Roger Carter	1
Dodge	Carter 2 Motorsports	67	Tim Viens	1
Dodge	Carter 2 Motorsports	97	Donnie Neuenberger	1
Dodge	Carter 2 Motorsports	97	Nick Tucker	1
Dodge	Carter 2 Motorsports	97	Juan Carlos Blum	1
Dodge	Carter 2 Motorsports	97	Cody Lane	1
Dodge	Carter 2 Motorsports	97	Jack Clarke (Note: Entry was fielded in a collaboration with Creation-Cope Racing.)	1
Dodge	Finney Racing Enterprises	3	Brian Finney (Note: It was a Finney Racing Enterprises entry using Hixson Motorsports' owner points.)	2
Dodge	Jack Hughs Racing	64	Aaron Willis	1
Dodge	Jack Hughs Racing	64	Joseph Hughs	4
Dodge	Jared Marks Racing	8	Jared Marks	1
Dodge	Jared Marks Racing	12	Jared Marks	13
Dodge	Jared Marks Racing	12	Leilani Münter	1
Dodge	Jones Group Racing	30	Terry Jones	3
Dodge	Rettig Racing	01	Austin Rettig	6
Dodge	Universe Racing	3	Steve Fox (Note: It was a Universe Racing entry using Hixson Motorsports' owner points.)	2
Ford	Andy Belmont Racing	1	Mikey Kile	5
Ford	Andy Belmont Racing	2	Brandon Davis	1
Ford	Andy Belmont Racing	2	Brandon Kidd	1
Ford	Andy Belmont Racing	2	Thomas Praytor	1
Ford	Andy Belmont Racing	5	Thomas Praytor	1 (Note: It was an Andy Belmont Racing entry using Bobby Gerhart Racing's owner points.)
Ford	Brad Hill Motorsports	70	Jeff Choquette	1
Ford	Brad Hill Motorsports	71	Shane Cockrum	1
Ford	Brad Smith Motorsports	26	Brad Smith	1
Ford	BRG Motorsports	61	Grant Enfinger	1
Ford	DGM Racing	39	Fain Skinner (Note: Entry was fielded in a collaboration with Roulo Brothers Racing.)	1
Ford	Empire Racing	82	Sean Corr	5
Ford	Kimmel Racing	69	Korbin Forrister	7
Ford	Kimmel Racing	69	Shawn Umphries	1
Ford	Kimmel Racing	69	Will Kimmel	2
Ford	Kimmel Racing	69	Clair Zimmerman	1
Ford	Kimmel Racing	69	Ira Small	1
Ford	Kimmel Racing	69	Brad Lloyd	1
Ford	Leavine Family Racing	95	Michael Leavine	8
Ford	McCreery Motorsports	57	Rodney Melvin	1
Ford	Motorhead Racing Company	78	Aleks Gregory	2
Ford	Shearer Racing	73	Dale Shearer	5
Ford	Team BCR Racing	09	Charles Evans Jr.	3
Ford	Team BCR Racing	09	Grant Enfinger	2
Ford	Team BCR Racing	09	Frankie Kimmel	1
Ford	Team BCR Racing	88	Buster Graham	11
Chevrolet 2 Dodge 1	Drew Charlson Racing	28	Drew Charlson	2
Chevrolet 2 Dodge 1	Drew Charlson Racing	3	Drew Charlson	1 (Note: It was a Drew Charlson Racing entry using Hixson Motorsports' owner points.)
Ford 3 Chevrolet 3 Dodge 2	Hixson Motorsports	2	Levi Youster	2
Ford 3 Chevrolet 3 Dodge 2	Hixson Motorsports	2	Dustin Hapka	2
Ford 3 Chevrolet 3 Dodge 2	Hixson Motorsports	2	Ron Cox	2
Ford 3 Chevrolet 3 Dodge 2	Hixson Motorsports	2	Tim Walter	2
Ford 1 Chevrolet 3 Dodge 1	Hixson Motorsports	3	Levi Youster	2
Ford 1 Chevrolet 3 Dodge 1	Hixson Motorsports	3	Chad Frewaldt	1
Ford 1 Chevrolet 3 Dodge 1	Hixson Motorsports	3	Tim Walter	1
Ford 1 Chevrolet 3 Dodge 1	Hixson Motorsports	3	Joe Cooksey	1
Toyota 2 Chevrolet 14	Ken Schrader Racing	52	Tom Hessert III	15
Toyota 2 Chevrolet 14	Ken Schrader Racing	52	Chad Boat	1

== Schedule ==
The 2012 series schedule was announced in November 2011.

No.	Race title	Track	Date
1	Lucas Oil Slick Mist 200	Daytona International Speedway, Daytona Beach	February 18
2	Mobile ARCA 200	Mobile International Speedway, Irvington	March 10
3	Kentuckiana Ford Dealers 200	Salem Speedway, Salem	April 29
4	International Motorsports Hall of Fame 250	Talladega Superspeedway, Talladega	May 4
5	Menards 200 presented by Federated Car Care	Toledo Speedway, Toledo	May 20
6	Akona 200 presented by Federated Car Care	Elko Speedway, Elko New Market	June 2
7	Pocono ARCA 200	Pocono Raceway, Pocono	June 9
8	RainEater Wiper Blades 200	Michigan International Speedway, Brooklyn	June 15
9	Herr's Chase the Taste 200	Winchester Speedway, Winchester	June 24
10	All America Race Weekend presented by Global Barter	New Jersey Motorsports Park, Millville	July 1
11	Prairie Meadows 200	Iowa Speedway, Newton	July 13
12	Ansell ActivArmr 150	Chicagoland Speedway, Joliet	July 21
13	Messina Wildlife Animal Stopper 200	Lucas Oil Raceway, Brownsburg	July 27
14	Pennsylvania ARCA 125	Pocono Raceway, Pocono	August 4
15	Berlin ARCA 200 presented by Hantz Group	Berlin Raceway, Marne	August 11
16	Allen Crowe Memorial 100	Illinois State Fairgrounds Racetrack, Springfield	August 19
17	Herr's Live Life with Flavor 200	Madison International Speedway, Rutland	August 26
18	Kentuckiana Ford Dealers ARCA Fall Classic	Salem Speedway, Salem	September 15
—	Southern Illinois 100	DuQuoin State Fairgrounds Racetrack, Du Quoin	October 14
19	Kansas Lottery 98.9	Kansas Speedway, Kansas City	October 19

== Results and standings ==
=== Races ===
No.	Race	Pole position	Most laps led	Winning driver	Manufacturer	No.	Winning team
1	Lucas Oil Slick Mist 200	Sean Corr	Brandon McReynolds	Bobby Gerhart	Chevrolet	5	Bobby Gerhart Racing
2	Mobile ARCA 200	Alex Bowman	Cale Gale	Cale Gale	Chevrolet	33	Eddie Sharp Racing
3	Kentuckiana Ford Dealers 200	Chris Buescher	Alex Bowman	Alex Bowman	Dodge	22	Cunningham Motorsports
4	International Motorsports Hall of Fame 250	Matt Lofton	Matt Lofton	Brandon McReynolds	Chevrolet	32	Win-Tron Racing with Turner Motorsports
5	Menards 200 presented by Federated Car Care	Alex Bowman	Chris Buescher	Chris Buescher	Ford	17	Roulo Brothers Racing
6	Akona 200 presented by Federated Car Care	Alex Bowman	Brennan Poole	Brennan Poole	Chevrolet	25	Venturini Motorsports
7	Pocono ARCA 200	Brennan Poole	Brennan Poole	Brennan Poole	Toyota	25	Venturini Motorsports
8	RainEater Wiper Blades 200	Joey Coulter	Brennan Poole	Chris Buescher	Ford	17	Roulo Brothers Racing
9	Herr's Chase the Taste 200	Chris Buescher	Brennan Poole	Alex Bowman	Dodge	22	Cunningham Motorsports
10	All America Race Weekend presented by Global Barter	Chad Hackenbracht	Andrew Ranger	Andrew Ranger	Dodge	53	NDS Motorsports
11	Prairie Meadows 200	Brennan Poole	Alex Bowman	Alex Bowman	Dodge	22	Cunningham Motorsports
12	Ansell ActivArmr 150	Kevin Swindell	Kevin Swindell	Kevin Swindell	Toyota	55	Venturini Motorsports
13	Messina Wildlife Animal Stopper 200	Matt Crafton	Chad Hackenbracht	Frank Kimmel	Toyota	44	ThorSport Racing
14	Pennsylvania ARCA 125	Brennan Poole	Alex Bowman	Chad Hackenbracht	Chevrolet	58	CGH Motorsports
15	Berlin ARCA 200 presented by Hantz Group	Chad Hackenbracht	Frank Kimmel	Chris Buescher	Ford	17	Roulo Brothers Racing
16	Allen Crowe Memorial 100	Alex Bowman	Frank Kimmel	Frank Kimmel	Toyota	44	ThorSport Racing
17	Herr's Live Life with Flavor 200	Alex Bowman	Chris Buescher	Chris Buescher	Ford	17	Roulo Brothers Racing
18	Kentuckiana Ford Dealers ARCA Fall Classic	Chase Elliott	Tom Hessert III	Tom Hessert III	Chevrolet	52	Ken Schrader Racing
—	Southern Illinois 100	Cancelled due to rain					
19	Kansas Lottery 98.9	Alex Bowman	Alex Bowman	Alex Bowman	Dodge	22	Cunningham Motorsports

=== Drivers' championship ===
(key) Bold – Pole position awarded by time. Italics – Pole position set by final practice results or rainout. * – Most laps led. ** – All laps led.

Pos	Driver	DAY	MOB	SLM	TAL	TOL	ELK	POC	MCH	WIN	NJE	IOW	CHI	IRP	POC	BLN	ISF	MAD	SLM	DSF	KAN	Points
1	Chris Buescher	20	6	**8**	17	1*	3	5	1	**4**	3	13	4	7	5	1	5	1*	2	C	8	4885
2	Frank Kimmel	23	17	2	7	2	4	6	7	11	7	5	3	1	4	2*	1*	9	4	C	6	4810
3	Brennan Poole	7	7	3	8	22	1*	**1***	11*	2*	6	**28**	2	4	**2***	9	22	10	8	C	4	4735
4	Alex Bowman	30	**3**	1*	32	**9**	**11**	3	2	1	13	1*	8	22	3	13	**2**	**2**	5	C	**1***	4725
5	Chad Hackenbracht	14	2	21	3	8	7	2	21	8	**26**	6	6	25*	1	**10**	6	3	31	C	24	4310
6	Matt Lofton	34	16	14	2*	11	2	4	3	5	25	7	16	11	7	8	14	11	10	C	38	4220
7	Spencer Gallagher	29	28	22	19	34	14	13	8	7	14	8	26	9	29	15	10	15	9	C	21	3720
8	Nelson Canache Jr.	22	22	33	27	16	16	14	32	19	12	30	7	14	10	12	23	12	11	C	12	3660
9	Josh Williams	33	20	9	12	13		10	29	10	22	32	20	13	21	17	18	7	22	C	13	3285
10	Tom Hessert III	10	9	13	4	5	5	11	24	21	9	29		2		4		6	1*			3205
11	Darrell Basham	27	35	17	23	35	19	24	28	14	23	22	28	21	28	18	21	25	17	C	36	3065
12	Will Kimmel	3	25	27	6	Wth	26	34	30	27	5	38	10	34	9	27	11	27	25	C	9	2990
13	James Hylton	38	33	25	24	32	20	22	22	25	27	24	22	32	30	24	27	22	24	C	29	2860
14	Ryan Reed	12	12	11	13	12	13	9	12	18		9	5	6	6						10	2720
15	Tommy O'Leary IV		32	34	34	DNQ	21	23	23	24	21	34	25	30	27	25	13	24	26	C	31	2490
16	Jared Marks	Wth	8	16	Wth	10	10	7	16	9		25	13	29					12		11	2240
17	Larry Barford Jr.	28	DNQ	19	30	25	17	17	33	15	17	23	21	23	25							2050
18	Mason Mingus		19	10		15	9			6	8	12		10		29	8	23	6			1930
19	Milka Duno	37	18	31	37	24		Wth			10	16	18	17	19			17	13		33	1790
20	Brandon Davis	19	27	23	9			21	5		4	27	11		13						22	1625
21	Erik Jones		29	5		26	9			3		11		33		3		4	27			1565
22	Kevin Swindell				11			19	14		19		**1****	3			3			C	2	1545
23	Buster Graham	17	23		15	23		16	10			19	19	16	18						27	1515
24	Bobby Gerhart	1			42	20		25	27			14	17	19	16						20	1310
25	Chase Elliott		10	4							2					7		8	**3**			1260
26	Clint King		5	6		4				12						6		5				1200
27	Grant Enfinger		13			3						2		27	8						3	1120
28	Mikey Kile	16	4	12	22	6																1100
29	Michael Leavine		31					26	Wth			15	14	15	31						17	890
30	Korbin Forrister		DNQ			28	25	29	31	29		37	32	24							27	790
31	Mason Mitchell											10		5		5					7	785
32	Austin Rettig		DNQ	18		21				13				20			9			C		770
33	Ed Pompa	31						18			30				17				16		23	705
34	Sean Corr	**43**	14	30	10			12														640
35	Aleks Gregory	41			28			33	26						14			13				610
36	Brad Lloyd		DC			33	23							18				14	21			605
37	Rick Clifton	39							18	28		21			32			20				590
38	Zach Ralston	18			16					30		20						29				585
39	Mike Koch	DNQ					28			22		31	31				19	Wth		C		520
40	Levi Youster		30	20		27	27											26				500
41	Tom Berte								17			26				24					18	495
42	A. J. Henriksen							8			18				15							495
43	Mark Thompson	5			14								24									475
44	Mike Affarano	DNQ			29							39	24				16			C	35	465
45	Roger Carter				35			32	34	31	31	33	33									465
46	Dale Shearer									17		40					20		18	C	40	465
47	George Cushman	35			43			27							20						16	460
48	Chad Boat											3		8							37	455
49	Clay Rogers					7			Wth			4		DNQ								435
50	Steve Blackburn	4			5																	420
51	Joey Coulter	DNQ			40	14			**9**													415
52	Brennan Newberry								4												5	415
53	Tim Walter													DNQ		20		21	19			415
54	Cale Gale	13	1*																			405
55	Drew Charlson	2			41							18										390
56	John Blankenship		DNQ	15					6													380
57	Darren Hagen													26		21		16				375
58	Thomas Praytor		34		20													28	28			370
59	James Swanson															26	31	18	35	C		370
60	Charles Evans Jr.		21	28		17																360
61	Steve Fox							15			29				23							355
62	Maryeve Dufault														26				23		19	350
63	Tyler Reddick		15	8																		345
64	Brett Hudson	21			21												34		34	C		335
65	Ronnie Souders Jr.					30				23									20			325
66	Roby Bujdoso												15								14	315
67	Brandon McReynolds	11*			1																	315
68	Evan Pardo																		14		15	315
69	Nick Tucker			29			15	31														315
70	Wayne Peterson		DNQ	26						26							29			C	39	305
71	Michael Simko											17				14						305
72	Chris Windom	8																			25	295
73	Ron Cox															22	12			C		290
74	Tyler Speer		DC		36												7			C		270
75	Tim Cowen					19					20											265
76	Brian Finney													12					29			255
77	Steve Arpin						12										30			C		250
78	Brian Kaltreider							20							22							250
79	Brad Smith	DNQ				DNQ			25				27									250
80	Andrew Ranger										1*											245
81	Juan Carlos Blum					29			15													240
82	Dominick Casola																26	19		C		235
83	Ricky Ehrgott															16					30	230
84	Joseph Hughs									16		36		Wth			35			C		225
85	Brian Keselowski		24	Wth	Wth											23						225
86	Terry Jones	25			38	31																220
87	Kelly Kovski																4			C		220
88	Mike Senica		DNQ	32							32			35								220
89	Dustin Hapka						18														32	210
90	Max Gresham	6																				200
91	Frankie Kimmel																		7			200
92	Joey Miller						6															200
93	Scott Null						22					35		DNQ								200
94	Tim Andrews												9									185
95	Alex Kennedy	9																				185
96	Blake Hillard			24															32			180
97	Brian Campbell															11						175
98	Jason Holehouse										11											175
99	Kyle Martel														11							175
100	Bubba Pollard		11																			175
101	Matt Merrell														12							170
102	Kyle Larson								13													165
103	Donnie Neuenberger	DNQ			18																	165
104	Caleb Armstrong																		15			155
105	Shane Cockrum																15			C		155
106	Willie Mullins										15											155
107	Fain Skinner	15																				155
108	Don Thompson							28							33							155
109	Ed Bull										16											150
110	David Levine												12									145
111	Mark Littleton																17			C		145
112	Brandon Kidd					18																140
113	Justin Lloyd															19						135
114	Kent Schenkel								19													135
115	Mike Buckley								20													130
116	Landon Cling									20												130
117	Brent Cross	Wth						30							35							130
118	A. J. Fike																24			C		110
119	Chad Frewaldt						24															110
120	Ed Kennedy	24																				110
121	Steve Minghenelli										24											110
122	Jeff Choquette																25			C		105
123	Mike Harmon	32			39																	105
124	Gregg Hutto Jr.				25																	105
125	Clay Campbell				26																	100
126	Daryl Eustace		26																			100
127	John Ferrier	DNQ			31																	100
128	Paulie Harraka	26																				100
129	John Wes Townley																				28	100
130	Bill Coffey	42			33																	95
131	Matt Crafton													**31**								95
132	Brad Cox													28								90
133	Robert Mitten										28											90
134	Ryan Unzicker																28			C		90
135	Richard Harriman												29									85
136	Jeremy Petty	DNQ																			34	85
137	Jack Clarke																		30			80
138	Tim Turner												30									80
139	Amber Koch									32												70
140	Ira Small																32			C		70
141	Joe Cooksey																33			C		65
142	Bob Strait																		33			65
143	Mike Young															28						65
144	Bradley Riethmeyer												34									60
145	Clair Zimmerman														34							60
146	Leilani Münter	36																				50
147	Sloan Henderson	40																				30
	Michael Bockler	DNQ																				25
	Cody Lane													DNQ								25
	Lucas Munroe						DC															25
	Casey Roderick	Wth																				25
	Ryan Rust					DNQ																25
	Shawn Umphries										DNS											25
	Tim Viens																		DNS			25

== See also ==
- 2012 NASCAR Sprint Cup Series
- 2012 NASCAR Nationwide Series
- 2012 NASCAR Camping World Truck Series
- 2012 NASCAR K&N Pro Series East
- 2012 NASCAR Whelen Modified Tour
- 2012 NASCAR Whelen Southern Modified Tour
- 2012 NASCAR Canadian Tire Series
- 2012 NASCAR Toyota Series
- 2012 NASCAR Stock V6 Series
- 2012 Racecar Euro Series
