= Steve Blackburn =

American racing driver

- Born: October 11, 1962 (age 64); Prestonburg, Kentucky, U.S.

ARCA Menards Series career
- 10 races run over 8 years
- Best finish: 50th (2012)
- First race: 2010 WLWT Channel 5 150 (Kentucky)
- Last race: 2012 International Motorsports Hall of Fame 250 (Talladega)
Wins	Top tens	Poles
0	2	0
- Statistics up to date as of January 22, 2025.

Steve Blackburn (born October 11, 1962) is an American professional stock car racing driver who competed in the ARCA Racing Series from 2005 to 2012. He also raced in other series, including the ARA Late Model Stock All-Star Tour, the UARA STARS Late Model Series, the Carolina Clash Super Late Model Series, and the I-95 Late Model Challenge.

== Motorsports results ==
=== ARCA Racing Series ===
(key) (Bold – Pole position awarded by qualifying time. Italics – Pole position earned by points standings or practice time. * – Most laps led.)

ARCA Racing Series results
Year	Team	No.	Make	1	2	3	4	5	6	7	8	9	10	11	12	13	14	15	16	17	18	19	20	21	22	23	ARSC	Pts	Ref
2005	Blackburn Motorsports	69	Dodge	DAY	NSH	SLM	KEN; DNQ	TOL	LAN	MIL	POC	MCH	KAN	KEN; 14	BLN	POC	GTW	LER	NSH	MCH; DNQ	ISF	TOL	DSF	CHI	SLM	TAL	104th	210	
2006	Blackburn Motorsports	69	Dodge	DAY	NSH; 36	SLM	WIN	KEN	TOL	POC	MCH	KAN	KEN	BLN	POC	GTW	NSH; DNQ	MCH	ISF	MIL	TOL	DSF	CHI	SLM	TAL	IOW	156th	75	
2007	Blackburn Motorsports	69	Dodge	DAY	USA	NSH	SLM	KAN	WIN	KEN; 24	TOL	IOW	POC	MCH	BLN	KEN; 21	POC	NSH	ISF	MIL	GTW	DSF	CHI	SLM	TAL	TOL	93rd	235	
2008	Blackburn Motorsports	69	Ford	DAY; DNQ	SLM	IOW	KAN	CAR	KEN	TOL	POC	MCH	CAY	KEN	BLN	POC	NSH	ISF	DSF	CHI	SLM	NJE					119th	145	
2008	Blackburn Motorsports	69	Dodge																				TAL; 22	TOL			119th	145	
2009	Blackburn Motorsports	69	Dodge	DAY; DNQ	SLM	CAR	TAL; 23	KEN	TOL	POC	MCH	MFD	IOW	KEN	BLN	POC	ISF	CHI	TOL	DSF	NJE	SLM	KAN	CAR			128th	140	
2010	Blackburn Motorsports	68	Dodge	DAY; 37	PBE	SLM	TEX	TAL	TOL	POC	MCH	IOW	MFD	POC	BLN	NJE	ISF	CHI	DSF	TOL	SLM	KAN	CAR				136th	45	
2011	Blackburn Motorsports	68	Dodge	DAY; 33	TAL	SLM	TOL	NJE	CHI	POC	MCH	WIN	BLN	IOW	IRP	POC	ISF	MAD	DSF	SLM	KAN	TOL					156th	65	
2012	Blackburn Motorsports	94	Chevy	DAY; 4	MOB	SLM	TAL; 5	TOL	ELK	POC	MCH	WIN	NJE	IOW	CHI	IRP	POC	BLN	ISF	MAD	SLM	DSF	KAN				50th	420	
