= Aleks Gregory =

American racing driver

- Born: February 2, 1989 (age 37); Baton Rouge, Louisiana, U.S.

ARCA Menards Series career
- 6 races run over 1 year
- Best finish: 35th (2012)
- First race: 2012 Lucas Oil Slick Mist 200 (Daytona)
- Last race: 2012 Herr's Live Life With Flavor 200 (Madison)
Wins	Top tens	Poles
0	0	0
- Statistics up to date as of January 20, 2025.

Aleks Gregory (born February 2, 1989) is an American former professional stock car racing driver who competed in six races in the ARCA Racing Series in 2012, getting a best finish of thirteenth at Madison International Speedway.

== Motorsports results ==
=== ARCA Racing Series ===
(key) (Bold – Pole position awarded by qualifying time. Italics – Pole position earned by points standings or practice time. * – Most laps led.)

ARCA Racing Series results
Year	Team	No.	Make	1	2	3	4	5	6	7	8	9	10	11	12	13	14	15	16	17	18	19	20	ARSC	Pts	Ref
2012	Motorhead Racing Company	78	Ford	DAY; 41	MOB	SLM	TAL; 28	TOL	ELK															35th	610	
2012	Win-Tron Racing	32	Toyota							POC; 33	MCH; 26	WIN	NJE	IOW	CHI	IRP								35th	610	
2012	Coulter Motorsports	61	Chevy														POC; 14	BLN	ISF	MAD; 13	SLM	DSF	KAN	35th	610	
