= Brad Lloyd (racing driver) =

American racing driver (born 1990)

- Born: August 11, 1990 (age 36); Napa, California, U.S.

ARCA Menards Series career
- 11 races run over 4 years
- Best finish: 36th (2012)
- First race: 2011 Hantz Group 200 (Berlin)
- Last race: 2013 ModSpace 125 (Pocono)
Wins	Top tens	Poles
0	0	0
- Statistics up to date as of January 20, 2025.

Brad Lloyd (born August 11, 1990) is an American former professional stock car racing driver who has previously competed in the ARCA Racing Series and the NASCAR K&N Pro Series West.

Lloyd has also competed in the X-1R Pro Cup Series.

== Motorsports results ==
=== NASCAR ===
(key) (Bold - Pole position awarded by qualifying time. Italics - Pole position earned by points standings or practice time. * – Most laps led.)

==== K&N Pro Series West ====
NASCAR K&N Pro Series West results
Year	Team	No.	Make	1	2	3	4	5	6	7	8	9	10	11	12	13	NKNPSWC	Pts	Ref
2009	Dave Lloyd	08	Ford	CTS	AAS	PHO	MAD	IOW	DCS	SON; 31	IRW	PIR	MMP	CNS	IOW	AAS	69th	70	
2010	Dave Lloyd	08	Ford	AAS	PHO	IOW	DCS	SON; 37	IRW	PIR	MRP	CNS	MMP; DNQ	AAS	PHO		64th	116	

=== ARCA Racing Series ===
(key) (Bold – Pole position awarded by qualifying time. Italics – Pole position earned by points standings or practice time. * – Most laps led.)

ARCA Racing Series results
Year	Team	No.	Make	1	2	3	4	5	6	7	8	9	10	11	12	13	14	15	16	17	18	19	20	21	ARSC	Pts	Ref
2010	Hover Motorsports	80	Ford	DAY; DNQ	PBE	SLM	TEX	TAL	TOL	POC	MCH	IOW	MFD	POC	BLN	NJE	ISF	CHI	DSF	TOL	SLM	KAN			N/A	0	
2011	Fast Track Racing	14	Dodge	DAY	TAL	SLM	TOL	NJE	CHI	POC	MCH	WIN	BLN; 29	IOW; 38											70th	320	
2011	McClure Motorsports	14	Dodge												IRP; DNQ	POC	ISF								70th	320	
2011	Fast Track Racing	11	Ford															MAD; 22	DSF	SLM					70th	320	
2011	Fast Track Racing	14	Ford																		KAN; 36	TOL			70th	320	
2012	Darrell Basham Racing	34	Ford	DAY	MOB; QL	SLM	TAL																		36th	605	
2012	Fast Track Racing	10	Ford					TOL; 33	ELK; 23	POC	MCH	WIN	NJE	IOW	CHI										36th	605	
2012	Brad Lloyd	51	Ford													IRP; 18	POC	BLN	ISF						36th	605	
2012	Kimmel Racing	68	Ford																	MAD; 14					36th	605	
2012	Kimmel Racing	69	Ford																		SLM; 21	DSF	KAN		36th	605	
2013	Kimmel Racing	69	Ford	DAY	MOB	SLM	TAL	TOL	ELK	POC	MCH	ROA	WIN; 13	CHI	NJM	POC; 22	BLN	ISF	MAD	DSF	IOW	SLM	KEN	KAN	83rd	185	
