= Drew Charlson =

American racing driver

- Born: February 9, 1993 (age 33); New Bremen, Ohio, U.S.

ARCA Menards Series career
- 6 races run over 3 years
- Best finish: 55th (2012)
- First race: 2011 Federated Car Care 200 (Toledo)
- Last race: 2013 International Motorsports Hall of Fame 250 (Talladega)
Wins	Top tens	Poles
0	1	0
- Statistics up to date as of January 20, 2025.

Drew Charlson (born February 9, 1993) is an American professional stock car racing driver who has previously competed in the ARCA Racing Series from 2011 to 2013.

Charlson also competed in series such as the ASA CRA Super Series, the CRA JEGS All-Stars Tour, the Main Event Racing Series, and the DIRTcar Summit Racing Equipment Modified Nationals.

== Motorsports results ==
=== ARCA Racing Series ===
(key) (Bold – Pole position awarded by qualifying time. Italics – Pole position earned by points standings or practice time. * – Most laps led.)

ARCA Racing Series results
Year	Team	No.	Make	1	2	3	4	5	6	7	8	9	10	11	12	13	14	15	16	17	18	19	20	21	ARSC	Pts	Ref
2011	Drew Charlson Racing	59	Chevy	DAY; DNQ	TAL	SLM	TOL	NJE	CHI	POC	MCH	WIN	BLN	IOW	IRP	POC	ISF	MAD	DSF	SLM	KAN				121st	135	
2011	Drew Charlson Racing	20	Dodge																			TOL; 24			121st	135	
2012	Drew Charlson Racing	28	Chevy	DAY; 2	MOB	SLM	TAL; 41	TOL	ELK	POC	MCH	WIN	NJE												55th	390	
2012	Drew Charlson Racing	3	Dodge											IOW; 18	CHI	IRP	POC	BLN	ISF	MAD	SLM	DSF	KAN		55th	390	
2013	Drew Charlson Racing	3	Chevy	DAY; 38	MOB	SLM	TAL; 15	TOL	ELK	POC	MCH	ROA	WIN	CHI	NJM	POC	BLN	ISF	MAD	DSF	IOW	SLM	KEN	KAN	102nd	195	
