= Brandon Davis (racing driver) =

American racing driver (born 1985)

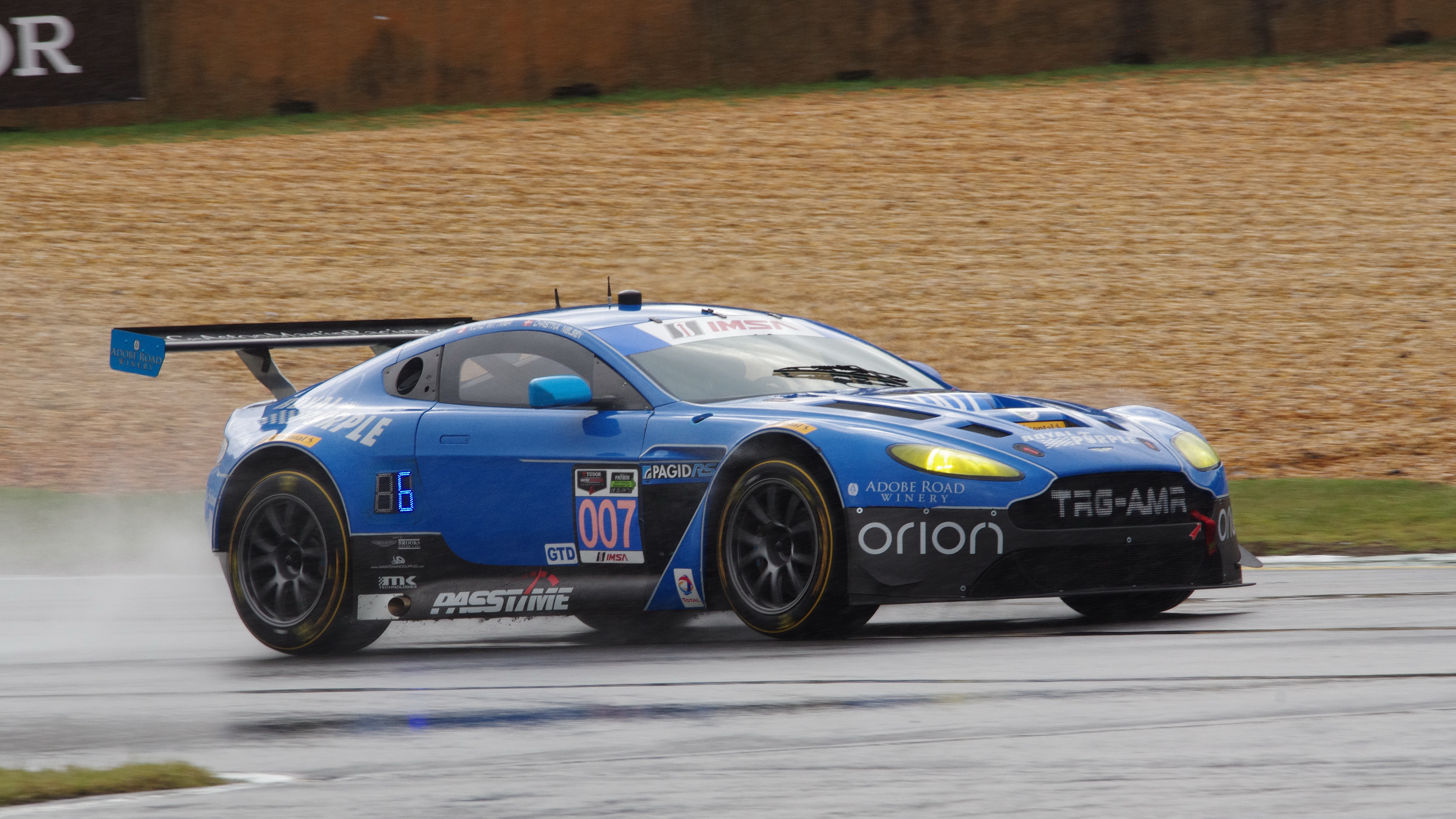
- Davis' No. 007 car at Road Atlanta in 2015
- Born: October 21, 1985 (age 41); Huntington Beach, California, U.S.

ARCA Menards Series career
- 11 races run over 1 year
- Best finish: 20th (2012)
- First race: 2012 Lucas Oil Slick Mist 200 (Daytona)
- Last race: 2012 Kansas Lottery 98.9 (Kansas)
Wins	Top tens	Poles
0	3	0
- Statistics up to date as of January 20, 2025.

Brandon Davis (born October 21, 1985) is an American former professional auto racing driver who has competed in the ARCA Racing Series and the NASCAR K&N Pro Series West.

Davis has also competed in series such as the IMSA WeatherTech SportsCar Championship, the Michelin Pilot Challenge, the GT World Challenge America, and the NASCAR Advance Auto Parts Weekly Series, and is a former competitor in the 24 Hours at Daytona.

== Motorsports results ==
=== NASCAR ===
(key) (Bold - Pole position awarded by qualifying time. Italics - Pole position earned by points standings or practice time. * – Most laps led.)

==== K&N Pro Series West ====
NASCAR K&N Pro Series West results
Year	Team	No.	Make	1	2	3	4	5	6	7	8	9	10	11	12	13	14	NKNPSWC	Pts	Ref
2009	Marsh Racing	30	Chevy	CTS	AAS	PHO	MAD	IOW	DCS	SON; 35	IRW	PIR	MMP	CNS	IOW	AAS		71st	58	
2010	Bill McAnally Racing	10	Chevy	AAS	PHO	IOW	DCS	SON; 3		PIR; 20	MRP	CNS	MMP; 24	AAS	PHO			26th	452	
2010	Bill McAnally Racing	10	Toyota						IRW; 25									26th	452	
2011	Erica Lindeman	10	Ford	PHO	AAS	MMP; 24	IOW	LVS	SON; 39	IRW; 28	EVG	PIR; 11	CNS	MRP	SPO	AAS		29th	493	
2011	Erica Lindeman	10	Toyota														PHO; 8	29th	493	

=== ARCA Racing Series ===
(key) (Bold – Pole position awarded by qualifying time. Italics – Pole position earned by points standings or practice time. * – Most laps led.)

ARCA Racing Series results
Year	Team	No.	Make	1	2	3	4	5	6	7	8	9	10	11	12	13	14	15	16	17	18	19	20	ARSC	Pts	Ref
2012	Andy Belmont Racing	2	Ford	DAY; 19																				20th	1625	
2012	Roulo Brothers Racing	99	Ford		MOB; 27	SLM; 23	TAL; 9	TOL	ELK	POC; 21	MCH; 5	WIN	NJE; 4	IOW; 27	CHI; 11	IRP	POC; 13	BLN	ISF	MAD	SLM	DSF	KAN; 22	20th	1625	
