= Brett Hudson (racing driver) =

American racing driver

- Born: December 1, 1987 (age 38); Owensboro, Kentucky, U.S.

ARCA Menards Series career
- 34 races run over 11 years
- Best finish: 32nd (2011)
- First race: 2005 Kentuckiana Ford Dealers ARCA 200 by Federated Auto Parts (Salem)
- Last race: 2016 General Tire 200 (Talladega)
Wins	Top tens	Poles
0	13	1
- Statistics up to date as of January 15, 2024.

Brett Hudson (born December 1, 1987) is an American professional stock car racing driver who has previously competed in the ARCA Racing Series.

== Racing career ==
Hudson made his debut in the ARCA Re/Max Series at Salem Speedway, driving the No. 62 Chevrolet for Bob Aiello, where he started sixth and finished eighth. He would run six more races for Aiello during the year, earning his only pole position in the series' return to Salem that October. Across the year, he scored three top-tens with a best finish of sixth at Lake Erie Speedway. Hudson then ran only three races in 2006, running one race for Dan Kinney at the first Salem event, where he finished twentieth, and two with Aiello, finishing 23rd at the second Salem event due to handling issues, and 21st at Iowa Speedway.

In 2007, Hudson formed his own team, and ran in four events that year. He finished in the top-ten in all the races he entered in with a best finish of fourth at the first Salem event. He then ran six events the following year, getting two sixth-place finishes at Kentucky Speedway and the second Salem event. Hudson then ran only one race for 2009 and 2010, although he did attempt to qualify for the first Salem event for Venturini Motorsports in the No. 35 Chevrolet, but failed to qualify.

In 2011, Hudson ran the season opening race at Daytona International Speedway, driving his self-owned No. 94 Dodge, having participated in pre-season testing at the track a month prior to the race. After starting 21st, Hudson finished in 43rd after suffering a crash due to a tire delamination four laps into the race. His team was able to repair the car in time for the next race at Talladega Superspeedway, where he finish fourth after starting eighteenth. He then ran the following race at Salem, this time in a Chevrolet, where he finished twentieth due to suspension issues. Afterwards, Hudson would not make another start that year until the race at Lucas Oil Raceway, where he finished tenth after starting twentieth. He then made his last race of the year at the second Salem event, where he finished 23rd due a crash.

In 2012, Hudson ran both super-speedway events at Daytona and Talladega, finishing 21st in both races. He then finish 34th at both the Illinois State Fairgrounds dirt track, and the second Salem event. In 2013, he only ran Daytona and the first Salem event, crashing out in both races, finishing 36th and 25th respectively.

After not running in the series in 2014, Hudson made a comeback at Daytona, driving his self-owned No. 09 Dodge. After starting fourth, he finished third, which was his best in the series. Afterwards, Hudson was docked 190 points after altering his restrictor-plate package on his car. Hudson returned to Daytona the following year, this time in the No. 15, where he finished in thirteenth after starting 27th. He then ran at Talladega, once again finishing thirteenth after starting twelfth. He has not competed in the series since then, as he has most recently competed in the CRA Street Stock Series.

== Motorsports results ==
=== ARCA Racing Series ===
(key) (Bold – Pole position awarded by qualifying time. Italics – Pole position earned by points standings or practice time. * – Most laps led.)

ARCA Racing Series results
Year	Team	No.	Make	1	2	3	4	5	6	7	8	9	10	11	12	13	14	15	16	17	18	19	20	21	22	23	ARSC	Pts	Ref
2005	Bob Aiello	62	Chevy	DAY	NSH	SLM; 8	KEN	TOL; 18	LAN	MIL; 30	POC	MCH	KAN	KEN	BLN; 10	POC	GTW	LER; 6	NSH	MCH	ISF	TOL; 20	DSF	CHI	**SLM**; 13	TAL	36th	1110	
2006	Dan Kinney	60	Chevy	DAY	NSH	SLM; 20	WIN	KEN	TOL	POC	MCH	KAN	KEN	BLN	POC	GTW	NSH	MCH	ISF	MIL	TOL	DSF	CHI				81st	370	
2006	Bob Aiello	62	Chevy																					SLM; 23	TAL	IOW; 21	81st	370	
2007	Brett Hudson Motorsports	12	Chevy	DAY	USA	NSH	SLM; 4	KAN	WIN	KEN	TOL	IOW	POC	MCH	BLN												42nd	795	
2007	Brett Hudson Motorsports	43	Dodge													KEN; 9	POC	NSH	ISF	MIL	GTW	DSF					42nd	795	
2007	Brett Hudson Motorsports	0	Dodge																				CHI; 8				42nd	795	
2007	Brett Hudson Motorsports	39	Chevy																					SLM; 5	TAL	TOL	42nd	795	
2008	Brett Hudson Motorsports	25	Chevy	DAY	SLM; 26	IOW	KAN	CAR													SLM; 6	NJE	TAL	TOL			43rd	690	
2008	Brett Hudson Motorsports	39	Dodge						KEN; 6	TOL	POC	MCH	CAY														43rd	690	
2008	Brett Hudson Motorsports	29	Dodge											KEN; 18	BLN	POC	NSH	ISF	DSF	CHI; 37							43rd	690	
2009	Brett Hudson Motorsports	25	Chevy	DAY	SLM; 9	CAR	TAL	KEN	TOL	POC	MCH	MFD	IOW	KEN	BLN	POC	ISF	CHI	TOL	DSF	NJE	SLM	KAN	CAR			116th	185	
2010	Venturini Motorsports	35	Chevy	DAY	PBE	SLM; DNQ	TEX	TAL	TOL	POC	MCH	IOW	MFD	POC	BLN	NJE	ISF	CHI									105th	140	
2010	Brett Hudson Motorsports	15	Chevy																DSF; 23	TOL	SLM	KAN	CAR				105th	140	
2011	Brett Hudson Motorsports	94	Dodge	DAY; 43	TAL; 4										IRP; 10	POC	ISF	MAD	DSF								32nd	665	
2011	Brett Hudson Motorsports	94	Chevy			SLM; 20	TOL	NJE	CHI	POC	MCH	WIN	BLN	IOW						SLM; 23	KAN	TOL					32nd	665	
2012	Brett Hudson Motorsports	09	Dodge	DAY; 21	MOB	SLM																					64th	335	
2012	Brett Hudson Motorsports	11	Dodge				TAL; 21	TOL	ELK	POC	MCH	WIN	NJE	IOW	CHI	IRP	POC	BLN									64th	335	
2012	Brett Hudson Motorsports	0	Ford																ISF; 34	MAD							64th	335	
2012	Brett Hudson Motorsports	0	Dodge																		SLM; 34	DSF	KAN				64th	335	
2013	Brett Hudson Motorsports	11	Dodge	DAY; 36	MOB																						114th	155	
2013	Brett Hudson Motorsports	52	Dodge			SLM; 25	TAL	TOL	ELK	POC	MCH	ROA	WIN	CHI	NJM	POC	BLN	ISF	MAD	DSF	IOW	SLM	KEN	KAN			114th	155	
2015	Brett Hudson Motorsports	09	Dodge	DAY; 3	MOB	NSH	SLM	TAL	TOL	NJE	POC	MCH	CHI	WIN	IOW	IRP	POC	BLN	ISF	DSF	SLM	KEN	KAN				138th	25	
2016	Brett Hudson Motorsports	15	Dodge	DAY; 13	NSH	SLM	TAL; 13	TOL	NJE	POC	MCH	MAD	WIN	IOW	IRP	POC	BLN	ISF	DSF	SLM	CHI	KEN	KAN				72nd	320	
