= Larry Barford Jr. =

American racing driver

- Born: April 13, 1975 (age 51); Denton, Maryland, U.S.

ARCA Menards Series career
- 13 races run over 1 year
- Best finish: 17th (2012)
- First race: 2012 Lucas Oil Slick Mist 200 (Daytona)
- Last race: 2012 Pennsylvania ARCA 125 (Pocono)
Wins	Top tens	Poles
0	0	0
- Statistics up to date as of January 19, 2025.

Larry Barford Jr. (born April 13, 1975) is an American retired Howard County police officer and former professional stock car racing driver who has competed in the ARCA Racing Series and the NASCAR K&N Pro Series East.

== Motorsports results ==
=== NASCAR ===
(key) (Bold - Pole position awarded by qualifying time. Italics - Pole position earned by points standings or practice time. * – Most laps led.)

==== K&N Pro Series East ====
NASCAR K&N Pro Series East results
Year	Team	No.	Make	1	2	3	4	5	6	7	8	9	10	11	12	13	14	NKNPSEC	Pts	Ref
2012	Deware Racing Group	86	Chevy	BRI	GRE	RCH	IOW	BGS	JFC	LGY	CNB	COL	IOW	NHA	DOV; 17	GRE; 19	CAR; 24	38th	72	

=== ARCA Racing Series ===
(key) (Bold – Pole position awarded by qualifying time. Italics – Pole position earned by points standings or practice time. * – Most laps led.)

ARCA Racing Series results
Year	Team	No.	Make	1	2	3	4	5	6	7	8	9	10	11	12	13	14	15	16	17	18	19	20	ARSC	Pts	Ref
2012	Carter 2 Motorsports	04	Dodge	DAY; 28	MOB; DNQ	SLM; 19	TAL; 30	TOL; 25	ELK; 17	POC; 17	MCH; 33	WIN; 15	NJE; 17	IOW; 23	CHI; 21	IRP; 23	POC; 25	BLN	ISF	MAD	SLM	DSF	KAN	17th	2050	
