= Nick Tucker =

American racing driver (born 1985)

- Born: Nicholas Tucker; August 26, 1985 (age 41); Bremerton, Washington, U.S.

NASCAR FedEx Freight Truck Series career
- 29 races run over 5 years
- Best finish: 30th (2009)
- First race: 2004 Kroger 200 (Martinsville)
- Last race: 2009 Ford 200 (Homestead-Miami)
Wins	Top tens	Poles
0	0	0

ARCA Menards Series career
- 14 races run over 5 years
- Best finish: 37th (2007)
- First race: 2007 Construct Corps–Palm Beach Grading 250 (Lakeland)
- Last race: 2013 Ansell ActivArmr 150 (Chicagoland)
Wins	Top tens	Poles
0	2	0

ARCA Menards Series East career
- 1 race run over 1 year
- Best finish: 47th (2026)
- First race: 2026 Cook Out 200 (Hickory)
Wins	Top tens	Poles
0	1	0
- Statistics up to date as of March 28, 2026.

Nicholas Tucker (born August 26, 1985) is an American professional stock car racing driver and team owner. He currently owns an ARCA Menards Series and a Trans-Am Series team Nitro Motorsports and as a driver most recently competed in the ARCA Menards Series East in 2026. Tucker is the cousin of former driver Derrike Cope.

== Career ==
Tucker began racing at age five, starting out by racing flat track four-wheelers and go-karts. At age 14, he came to the point where he had to move up to racing late models to advance his career. However, because of Washington state regulations, he could not compete in those cars in his home state. As a result, he and his family moved to North Carolina in the Charlotte metropolitan area where most NASCAR teams are located, where he began to race those cars there.

Tucker was a late entry to the 2009 rookie of the year class in the Truck Series. Joining the new GunBroker Racing team to drive their No. 21 Dodge, he drove nearly the entire season starting at the Michigan race. (The only race he did not run was Talladega, with Sean Murphy in the truck instead.) Unfortunately, Tucker had to start-and-park in almost all of those starts due to lack of sponsorship and the team's focus on fielding their primary truck, the No. 23, driven by Jason White. The only race he was running at the finish of was the season-finale at Homestead, where the team found sponsorship from the Denny Hamlin Foundation and ran the whole race. Tucker finished five laps down in 26th in what would turn out to be his final start in the Truck Series.

Tucker served as a crew chief for Carter 2 Motorsports in the ARCA Series in 2012, but gave up that role for three races (Salem, Elko, and the first Pocono race) to be a driver for the team in them. At the first two of those races, Tucker drove C2M's No. 40, and for Pocono, he was in the No. 97. His cars were sponsored by Ron Paul's Republican presidential campaign that year.

After his time driving in NASCAR and ARCA, Tucker returned to the go-kart racing industry and founded a cadet karting race team called Nitro Kart in 2016 to help up-and-coming go-kart drivers move up the racing ladder.

== Motorsports career results ==
=== Stock car career summary ===
Season	Series	Team	Races	Wins	Top 5	Top 10	Points	Position
2004	NASCAR Craftsman Truck Series	Ron Rhodes Racing	1	0	0	0	103	89th
2005	NASCAR Craftsman Truck Series	Brevak Racing	4	0	0	0	334	56th
2006	NASCAR Craftsman Truck Series	Brevak Racing	0	0	0	0	0	N/A
2007	ARCA Re/Max Series	James Hylton Motorsports with Carter 2 Motorsports	6	0	0	0	900	37th
2007	ARCA Re/Max Series	Prototype Racing	1	0	0	1	900	37th
2008	ARCA Re/Max Series	Mark Gibson Racing	1	0	0	0	150	113th
2008	NASCAR Craftsman Truck Series	Derrike Cope Inc.	6	0	0	0	192	62nd
2008	NASCAR Craftsman Truck Series	Lafferty Motorsports	1	0	0	0	192	62nd
2009	NASCAR Camping World Truck Series	Lafferty Motorsports	1	0	0	0	1065	30th
2009	NASCAR Camping World Truck Series	GunBroker Racing	16	0	0	0	1065	30th
2011	ARCA Racing Series	Carter 2 Motorsports	0	0	0	0	0	164th
2012	ARCA Racing Series	Carter 2 Motorsports	3	0	0	0	315	69th
2013	ARCA Racing Series	Carter 2 Motorsports	3	0	0	1	410	62nd
2026	ASA STARS National Tour	Dan Fredrickson	1	0	0	0		
2026	ARCA Menards Series East	Nitro Motorsports	1	0	1	1	39	47th

=== NASCAR ===
(key) (Bold – Pole position awarded by qualifying time. Italics – Pole position earned by points standings or practice time. * – Most laps led.)

==== Nationwide Series ====
NASCAR Nationwide Series results
Year	Team	No.	Make	1	2	3	4	5	6	7	8	9	10	11	12	13	14	15	16	17	18	19	20	21	22	23	24	25	26	27	28	29	30	31	32	33	34	35	NNSC	Pts	Ref
2008	Ege Motorsports	57	Dodge	DAY	CAL	LVS	ATL	BRI	NSH	TEX	PHO	MXC	TAL	RCH	DAR	CLT	DOV	NSH	KEN	MLW	NHA	DAY	CHI	GTY; DNQ	IRP	CGV	GLN	MCH											N/A	0	
2008	CFK Motorsports	78	Dodge																										BRI; DNQ	CAL	RCH	DOV	KAN	CLT	MEM	TEX	PHO	HOM	N/A	0	

^{*} Season still in progress
^{1} Ineligible for series points

==== Camping World Truck Series ====
NASCAR Camping World Truck Series results
Year	Team	No.	Make	1	2	3	4	5	6	7	8	9	10	11	12	13	14	15	16	17	18	19	20	21	22	23	24	25	NCWTC	Pts	Ref
2004	Ron Rhodes Racing	48	Dodge	DAY	ATL	MAR	MFD	CLT	DOV	TEX	MEM	MLW	KAN	KEN	GTW	MCH	IRP; DNQ	NSH	BRI; DNQ	RCH	NHA	LVS	CAL	TEX	MAR; 20	PHO	DAR	HOM	89th	103	
2005	Brevak Racing	31	Chevy	DAY	CAL	ATL	MAR; DNQ	GTY; 26	MFD	CLT; DNQ	DOV	TEX	MCH	MLW; 29	KAN	KEN; 23	MEM	IRP	NSH	BRI; 28	RCH	NHA	LVS	MAR	ATL	TEX	PHO	HOM	56th	334	
2006	Brevak Racing	31	Chevy	DAY	CAL	ATL	MAR	GTY; DNQ	CLT; DNQ	MFD	DOV	TEX	MCH	MLW	KAN	KEN	MEM	IRP	NSH	BRI	NHA	LVS	TAL	MAR	ATL	TEX	PHO	HOM	N/A	0	
2008	Derrike Cope Inc.	73	Dodge	DAY	CAL	ATL	MAR	KAN	CLT; DNQ	MFD	DOV; 35	TEX; 33					IRP; 32	NSH	BRI	GTW	NHA	LVS	TAL						62nd	192	
2008	Derrike Cope Inc.	74	Dodge										MCH; 31	MLW; 33										MAR; 35	ATL	TEX	PHO	HOM	62nd	192	
2008	Lafferty Motorsports	89	Chevy												MEM; 34	KEN													62nd	192	
2009	Lafferty Motorsports	89	Chevy	DAY	CAL	ATL	MAR	KAN	CLT	DOV	TEX; 30																		30th	1065	
2009	GunBroker Racing	21	Dodge									MCH; 32	MLW; 33	MEM; 32	KEN; 30	IRP; 35	NSH; 31	BRI; 34	CHI; 34	IOW; 32	GTW; 30	NHA; 34	LVS; 29	MAR; 34	TAL	TEX; 36	PHO; 34	HOM; 26	30th	1065	

=== ARCA Racing Series ===
(key) (Bold – Pole position awarded by qualifying time. Italics – Pole position earned by points standings or practice time. * – Most laps led.)

ARCA Racing Series results
Year	Team	No.	Make	1	2	3	4	5	6	7	8	9	10	11	12	13	14	15	16	17	18	19	20	21	22	23	ARSC	Pts	Ref
2007	James Hylton Motorsports with Carter 2 Motorsports	48	Dodge	DAY	USA; 15	NSH; 30	SLM; 16	KAN; 27	WIN; 26	KEN; 21	TOL	IOW	POC	MCH	BLN	KEN	POC	NSH	ISF	MIL	GTW	DSF	CHI				37th	900	
2007	Prototype Racing	67	Dodge																					SLM; 7	TAL	TOL	37th	900	
2008	Mark Gibson Racing	59	Dodge	DAY	SLM	IOW	KAN	CAR; 15	KEN	TOL	POC	MCH	CAY	KEN	BLN	POC	NSH	ISF	DSF	CHI	SLM	NJM	TAL	TOL			113th	150	
2011	Carter 2 Motorsports	04	Dodge	DAY	TAL	SLM	TOL	NJE	CHI	POC	MCH	WIN	BLN	IOW	IRP	POC	ISF	MAD	DSF	SLM	KAN	TOL; DNQ					164th	0	
2012	Carter 2 Motorsports	40	Dodge	DAY	MOB	SLM; 29	TAL	TOL	ELK; 15																		69th	315	
2012	Carter 2 Motorsports	97	Dodge							POC; 31	MCH	WIN	NJE	IOW	CHI	IRP	POC	BLN	ISF	MAD	SLM	DSF	KAN				69th	315	
2013	Carter 2 Motorsports	40	Dodge	DAY	MOB; 7	SLM; 24	TAL	TOL	ELK	POC	MCH	ROA	WIN														62nd	410	
2013	Carter 2 Motorsports	97	Dodge											CHI; 25	NJE	POC	BLN	ISF	MAD	DSF	IOW	SLM	KEN	KAN			62nd	410	

==== ARCA Menards Series East ====
ARCA Menards Series East results
Year	Team	No.	Make	1	2	3	4	5	6	7	8	AMSEC	Pts	Ref
2026	Nitro Motorsports	70	Toyota	HCY; 5	CAR	NSV	TOL	IRP	FRS	IOW	BRI	47th	39	

=== ASA STARS National Tour ===
(key) (Bold – Pole position awarded by qualifying time. Italics – Pole position earned by points standings or practice time. * – Most laps led. ** – All laps led.)

ASA STARS National Tour results
Year	Team	No.	Make	1	2	3	4	5	6	7	8	9	10	11	ASNTC	Pts	Ref
2026	Dan Fredrickson	36	Chevy	NSM	FIF	HCY; 14	SLG	MAD	NPS	OWO	TRI	WIN	NSV	NSM	-*	-*	
