= Cody Lane =

American stock car racing driver

- Born: January 3, 1996 (age 30) Missouri, U.S.

ARCA Racing Series career
- Debut season: 2013
- Current team: Cody Lane Racing
- Car number: 27
- Former teams: Carter 2 Motorsports
- Starts: 5
- Wins: 0
- Poles: 0
- Best finish: 19th

Previous series
- 2010: Florida All Star Tour

NASCAR FedEx Freight Truck Series career
- 0 races run over 1 year
- Best finish: 115th (2015)
Wins	Top tens	Poles
0	0	0
- Statistics up to date as of December 13, 2017.

Cody Lane (born January 3, 1996) is an American professional stock car racing driver. He last competed part-time in the NASCAR Xfinity Series, driving the No. 27 Chevrolet Camaro for the Cody Lane Racing. He has also competed in the ARCA Racing Series and NASCAR Camping World Truck Series.

== Racing career ==
A native of Missouri, Lane began his career in racing at the age of four, racing in go-karts; he moved up to late model racing at the age of 14. Racing in central Tennessee in his mid-teens, after his family moved to Florida he became a regular competitor at Citrus County Speedway and Showtime Speedway Lane competed in the Florida All Stars Tour in 2010, finishing tenth in series points; by the merits of that he received the series' Rookie of the Year award. Lane's 2011 and 2012 racing seasons were the subject of a documentary, Blue Collar Racing, filmed by James Sherry.

Lane made his debut in major-league stock car racing in ARCA Racing Series competition on March 9, 2013, competing in the ARCA Mobile 200 at Mobile International Speedway. Driving for a team owned by his family, and a car originally driven by Carl Edwards in 2009, he started 18th in the event, finishing 25th after an accident in which he launched his car outside the track in turn 3, landing in a grove of trees; during practice for the event, he had skidded outside the track in Turn 4. Lane finished 27th in his second race of the year at Toledo Speedway; he then posted his best finish of the year, fourteenth, at Winchester Speedway in June. Lane raced with money from his parents until he turned eighteen; after that, it was all sponsorship money.

In 2015, Lane and his own team attempted a NASCAR Camping World Truck Series race at Bristol Motor Speedway; however, the attempt ended when the team failed to qualify.

After taking a hiatus from major racing since 2015, Lane returned to the ARCA series for the 2017 Lucas Oil Complete Engine Treatment 200 at Daytona. The car Lane was driving was built by a group of 75 high school dropouts in the Pasco County, Florida area. After arriving late to the track, the Dream Team had a limited amount of track time and was the fastest car that did not qualify for the race. Lane and crew soldiered on to the next race, again missing inspection and starting from the back. He attempted one more race in 2017 at Talladega Superspeedway, getting collected in a large wreck and finishing nineteenth.

Lane attempted to make his Xfinity Series' debut in 2018 NASCAR Xfinity Series season at Richmond Raceway but he crashed in his first lap in opening practice so he was forced to withdraw the event.

== Personal life ==
A native of Missouri, his family moved to Florida due to family issues; Lane attended Fivay High School.

== Motorsports career results ==
=== NASCAR ===
(key) (Bold – Pole position awarded by qualifying time. Italics – Pole position earned by points standings or practice time. * – Most laps led.)

==== Xfinity Series ====
NASCAR Xfinity Series results
Year	Team	No.	Make	1	2	3	4	5	6	7	8	9	10	11	12	13	14	15	16	17	18	19	20	21	22	23	24	25	26	27	28	29	30	31	32	33	NXSC	Pts	Ref
2018	Cody Lane Racing	27	Chevy	DAY	ATL	LVS	PHO	CAL	TEX	BRI	RCH	TAL	DOV	CLT	POC	MCH	IOW	CHI	DAY	KEN	NHA	IOW	GLN	MOH	BRI	ROA	DAR	IND	LVS	RCH; Wth	CLT	DOV	KAN	TEX	PHO	HOM	NA	-	

==== Camping World Truck Series ====
NASCAR Camping World Truck Series results
Year	Team	No.	Make	1	2	3	4	5	6	7	8	9	10	11	12	13	14	15	16	17	18	19	20	21	22	23	NCWTC	Pts	Ref
2015	Cody Lane Racing	27	Chevy	DAY	ATL	MAR	KAN	CLT	DOV	TEX	GTW	IOW	KEN	ELD	POC	MCH	BRI; DNQ	MSP	CHI	NHA	LVS	TAL	MAR	TEX	PHO	HOM	114th	-	

^{*} Season still in progress
^{1} Ineligible for series points

=== ARCA Racing Series ===
(key) (Bold – Pole position awarded by qualifying time. Italics – Pole position earned by points standings or practice time. * – Most laps led.)

ARCA Racing Series results
Year	Team	No.	Make	1	2	3	4	5	6	7	8	9	10	11	12	13	14	15	16	17	18	19	20	21	ARSC	Pts	Ref
2012	Carter 2 Motorsports	97	Dodge	DAY	MOB	SLM	TAL	TOL	ELK	POC	MCH	WIN	NJE	IOW	CHI	IRP; DNQ	POC	BLN	ISF	MAD	SLM	DSF	KAN		NA	-	
2013	Cody Lane Racing	3	Ford	DAY	MOB; 24	SLM	TAL																		69th	365	
2013	Carter 2 Motorsports	40	Dodge					TOL; 27	ELK	POC	MCH	ROA	WIN; 14	CHI	NJE	POC	BLN	ISF	MAD	DSF	IOW	SLM	KEN	KAN	69th	365	
2017	Dream Team of Pasco	67	Dodge	DAY; DNQ																					70th	255	
2017	Dream Team of Pasco	67	Chevy		NSH; 27	SLM	TAL; 19	TOL	ELK	POC	MCH	MAD	IOW	IRP	POC	WIN	ISF	ROA	DSF	SLM	CHI	KEN	KAN		70th	255	
