= Roger Carter (racing driver) =

American professional stock car driver

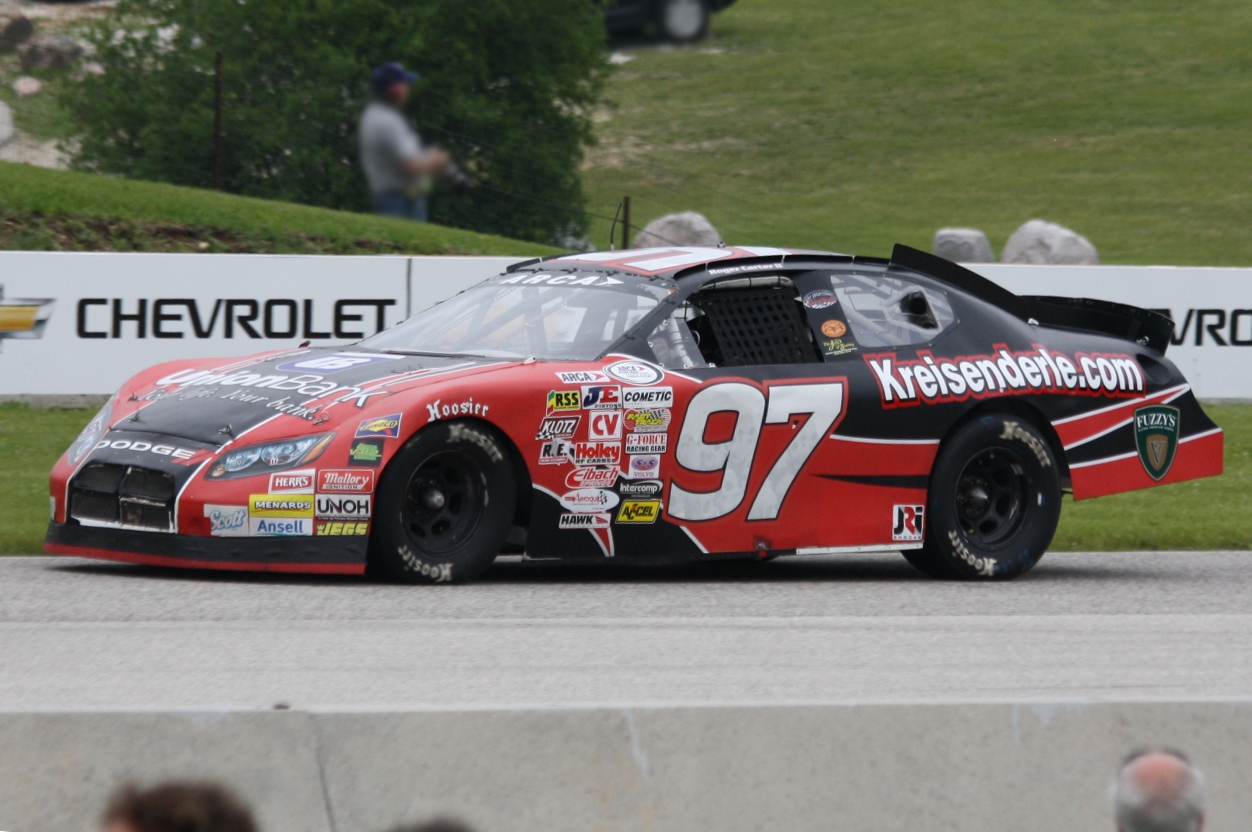
- Carter's No. 97 car at Road America in 2013
- Born: October 23, 1969 (age 57); Sunfield, Michigan, U.S.

ARCA Menards Series career
- 40 races run over 6 years
- Best finish: 12th (2013)
- First race: 2011 The RainEater Wiper Blades 200 (Michigan)
- Last race: 2023 Herr's Snacks 200 (Berlin)
Wins	Top tens	Poles
0	1	0
- Statistics up to date as of August 31, 2026.

Roger Lee Carter II (born October 23, 1969) is an American professional stock car racing driver and team owner who last competed part-time in the ARCA Menards Series driving the No. 03 Ford for Clubb Racing Inc.

== Racing career ==
Carter would attempt to make his first ARCA Re/Max Series race in 2006, driving for his own team in the No. 60 Chevrolet at Iowa Speedway, but ultimately failed to qualify for the event. He would attempt to make his debut the next year in 2007 with his own team again, with his first attempt being at the season opener at Daytona International Speedway, where he would not qualify for. His second attempt that year was originally scheduled at USA International Speedway, a race where he would withdraw from due to a "personal injury" and would be replaced by Nick Tucker. After not attempting any races in 2008, Carter would once again attempt to make the season opener at Daytona in 2009 in the No. 54 Dodge for Sherry Bell, but would fail to qualify.

In 2011, Carter would finally make his ARCA debut at Michigan Speedway driving the No. 40 Dodge for his own team, where he would finish 38th after two laps due to an engine issue. He would make three more starts throughout the year with a best finish of 16th at Madison International Speedway. In the next year, he would run seven races on the schedule, failing to finish in all his starts that year.

For 2013, Carter would run all but one race of the schedule in 2013 (that being at Chicagoland Speedway), driving his self owned No. 97 Dodge. During the course of the season, he would achieve eight top-20 finishes, including a top-ten at Michigan where he would finish eighth on the lead lap. Carter would run a partial schedule in 2014, primarily the No. 40 and No. 97 entries for his own team, and would have a best finish of eleventh at Pocono Raceway. Carter would run only one race in 2015, driving at Daytona in the No. 40 Dodge, finishing 32nd and five laps down to race winner Grant Enfinger.

In 2023, it was revealed on the entry list for the race at Berlin Raceway that Carter would make his first start in the series in seven years driving the No. 03 Ford for Clubb Racing Inc.

== Team ownership ==
Carter owned and operated a team in the ARCA Racing Series named Carter 2 Motorsports with his wife Dana from 2006 to 2015, and primarily ran in Dodges driven by a multitude of drivers such as Bobby Hamilton Jr., Nick Tucker, Carl Long, Dominick Casola, Larry Barford Jr., and others.

In 2011, the team would run under the name Carter/Eminem Motorsports, supposedly a partnership with American rapper Eminem, who would be providing additional funding, although no other details were released during that time.

In 2014, the team had announced that former NASCAR driver Bobby Hamilton Jr. would drive for them full time in the No. 40, although they would mutually agree to split before the first race. Despite this, they would team up again for 2015, originally planning for Hamilton Jr. to run full-time in the No. 97, although Hamilton Jr. would depart the team after the tenth round at Chicagoland Speedway.

In 2022, Carter and Mike Affarano announced that they would run two races in the Camping World Truck Series season in a Chevrolet, although they would not make an attempt during the season, as their truck, which Carter claimed was a "brand new Ronnie Hopkins" truck, had a body style of a 2014-15 spec truck, which had been barred from competition a few years prior.

== Legal issues ==
In 2015, it was reported that Carter had an arrest warrant issued to him and wife Dana Upright Royal for tax evasion; both were later arrested in August later that year. When Carter initially announced his intentions for his team to return to the ARCA series in 2016, it was revealed that Carter had been banned from competition due to his outstanding warrants.

In 2019, both Carters would be sentenced to two to fifteen years in prison in Michigan for operating a fake RV business front and committing fraud.

While out on probation in April 2024, Carter was assigned to pick up and complete a car from Kimmel Racing for the family of Brandon McKenzie, who previously competed in two ARCA races for Carter in 2015. Somewhere over the course of the summer, Carter claimed to have lost the car around Crete, Illinois.

On July 29, 2024, Carter was arrested on a Parole Violation 'placeholder charge' while investigators from North Carolina, Indiana, Virginia, and Michigan pooled together their information. Carter was processed and tucked away at the Ingham County Command Post at the Cedar St. Jail and is expected to be interviewed by several agencies.

As of August 5, 2024, there was an active $5,000 reward for information on the stolen racecar. On September 16, a farmer near Crete ILL discovered the red chassis ditched in a cornfield and immediately called the Kankakee Police Department. About 48 hours later, the missing Yates Engine and transmission were discovered in a nearby storage locker.

== Motorsports results ==
=== ARCA Menards Series ===
(key) (Bold – Pole position awarded by qualifying time. Italics – Pole position earned by points standings or practice time. * – Most laps led.)

ARCA Menards Series results
Year	Team	No.	Make	1	2	3	4	5	6	7	8	9	10	11	12	13	14	15	16	17	18	19	20	21	22	23	AMSC	Pts	Ref
2006	Carter 2 Motorsports	60	Chevy	DAY	NSH	SLM	WIN	KEN	TOL	POC	MCH	KAN	KEN	BLN	POC	GTW	NSH	MCH	ISF	MIL	TOL	DSF	CHI	SLM	TAL	IOW; DNQ	N/A	0	
2007	Carter 2 Motorsports	48	Dodge	DAY; DNQ	USA	NSH	SLM	KAN	WIN	KEN	TOL	IOW	POC	MCH	BLN	KEN	POC	NSH	ISF	MIL	GTW	DSF	CHI	SLM	TAL	TOL	N/A	0	
2009	Bell Racing Enterprises	54	Dodge	DAY; DNQ	SLM	CAR	TAL	KEN	TOL	POC	MCH	MFD	IOW	KEN	BLN	POC	ISF	CHI	TOL	DSF	NJE	SLM	KAN	CAR			N/A	0	
2011	Carter/Eminem Motorsports	40	Dodge	DAY	TAL	SLM	TOL	NJE	CHI	POC	MCH; 38	WIN	BLN	IOW; 30	IRP	POC; DNQ	ISF	MAD; 16	DSF	SLM	KAN; Wth	TOL; DNQ					68th	320	
2012	Carter 2 Motorsports	67	Dodge	DAY	MOB	SLM	TAL; 35	TOL	ELK																		45th	465	
2012	Carter 2 Motorsports	40	Dodge							POC; 32	MCH; 34	WIN; 31	NJE; 31	IOW; 33	CHI; 33	IRP	POC	BLN	ISF	MAD	SLM	DSF	KAN				45th	465	
2013	Carter 2 Motorsports	97	Dodge	DAY; 27	MOB; 15	SLM; 12	TAL; 35	TOL; 17	ELK; 14	POC; 28	MCH; 8	ROA; 21	WIN; 15	CHI	NJM; 27	POC; 28	BLN; 20	ISF; 23	MAD; 24	DSF; 28	IOW; 29	SLM; 21	KEN; 16	KAN; 24			12th	3440	
2014	Carter 2 Motorsports	97	Dodge	DAY	MOB	SLM	TAL	TOL	NJM	POC	MCH	ELK	WIN	CHI; 23	IRP	POC; 11	BLN; 17	ISF; 16				KEN; 31					29th	945	
2014	Carter 2 Motorsports	40	Dodge																MAD; 25	DSF; 25	SLM		KAN; 31				29th	945	
2015	Carter 2 Motorsports	40	Dodge	DAY; 32	MOB	NSH	SLM	TAL	TOL	NJE	POC	MCH	CHI	WIN	IOW	IRP	POC	BLN	ISF	DSF	SLM	KEN	KAN				135th	70	
2023	Clubb Racing Inc.	03	Ford	DAY	PHO	TAL	KAN	CLT	BLN; 11	ELK	MOH	IOW	POC; Wth	MCH	IRP	GLN	ISF	MLW	DSF	KAN	BRI	SLM	TOL				85th	33	
