= Roulo Brothers Racing =

Former American stock car team

- Owner(s): Gary Roulo, Russ Roulo
- Series: NASCAR Winston Cup Series, ARCA Racing Series
- Race drivers: Chris Buescher, Ty Majeski, Peter Shepherd III, David Ragan, Bob Strait, Brandon Davis
- Manufacturer: Ford
- Opened: 1993
- Closed: 2016

Career
- Drivers' Championships: 1
- Race victories: 32

Roulo Brothers Racing is a former American stock car racing team that ran from 1993 to 2016. It primarily fielded entries in the ARCA Racing Series, and was owned by brothers Gary and Russ Roulo. Throughout its history, the team won 32 races and won the series championship in 2012 with future NASCAR Cup Series driver Chris Buescher. The team also fielded entries in the Cup Series from 1993 to 1994.
