= ARCA Mobile 200 =

ARCA Racing Series
- Venue: Mobile International Speedway
- Location: Irvington, Alabama, United States
- Corporate sponsor: None
- First race: 2012
- Last race: 2015
- Distance: 100 miles (160.934 km)
- Laps: 200
- Previous names: Mobile ARCA 200 (2012)
- Most wins (driver): Grant Enfinger (3)
- Most wins (manufacturer): Ford, Chevrolet (2)

The ARCA Mobile 200 was an ARCA Racing Series presented by Menards race held at the Mobile International Speedway in Irvington, Alabama. With the inaugural event occurring in 2012, the race was removed from the calendar after the 2015 season.

== Past winners ==
Year	Date	Driver	Manufacturer	Race Distance		Race Time	Average Speed (mph)
Year	Date	Driver	Manufacturer	Laps	Miles (km)	Race Time	Average Speed (mph)
2012	March 10	Cale Gale	Chevrolet	200	100 (160.934)	1:48:04	56.349
2013	March 9	Grant Enfinger	Ford	200	100 (160.934)	1:46:56	56.108
2014	March 22	Grant Enfinger	Ford	204*	102 (164.153)	1:46:37	57.396
2015	March 14	Grant Enfinger	Chevrolet	205*	102.5 (164.958)	2:01:05	59.222

- 2014 and 2015: Race was extended due to a Green–white–checkered finish.
