= Tyler Speer =

American racing driver (born 1990)

- Born: December 21, 1990 (age 35) Woodstock, Georgia, U.S.

ARCA Menards Series career
- Debut season: 2010
- Current team: Fast Track Racing Enterprises
- Car number: 11
- Engine: Toyota
- Starts: 14
- Championships: 0
- Wins: 0
- Podiums: 0
- Poles: 0
- Best finish: 53rd in 2017
- Finished last season: 71st (2019)

Championship titles
- 2016: Lucas Oil Drag Boat Racing Series Pro Modified

Tyler Speer (born December 21, 1990) is an American stock car racing and drag boat racing driver. He last competed in the now defunct Lucas Oil Drag Boat Racing Series and has also competed in the ARCA Menards Series.

== Racing career ==
Speer started racing motocross when he was five years old, followed by go-karts at the age of 12. In 2009, when he was 15, he competed in the Allison Legacy Series, winning a race and finishing fourth in the championship standings.

In December 2009, Speer earned an ARCA Racing Series license after testing at Daytona International Speedway. A year later, he made his ARCA debut at Rockingham Speedway, driving the No. 10 Chevrolet for 1995 series champion Andy Hillenburg; after qualifying 40th, he finished 32nd. He continued to compete part-time in ARCA, recording a top-ten (seventh-place finish) at Illinois State Fairgrounds in 2012. In 2016, he ran the Illinois and DuQuoin State Fairgrounds Racetrack races, finishing seventh in both events.

Speer began racing drag boats in 2015, driving a Hedman Husler Hedders Pro Modified for Amphibious Motorsports in the Lucas Oil Drag Boat Racing Series. In his debut, Speer was the fastest qualifier, followed by winning his first race in the second and third rounds. He ended the 2015 season with a seventh-place finish in the points standings. His Pro Modified boat featured parts from an ARCA car, such as the steering column and dry sump system. His boat and firesuit are also adorned with ARCA logos. In 2016, Speer had a slow start to the season, as he suffered first-round eliminations in the first two races, but was able to take the points lead with two races remaining. At the final event held at Wild Horse Motorsports Park, Speer overcame a poor qualifying session to win the 2016 Pro Modified Division championship, ending the year with a 198-point advantage over the runner-up. He moved up to the Top Fuel Division in 2017, while also competing in Pro Outlaw races.

In October of 2026, he announced on his Instagram profile that Feld Entertainment had hired him as Monster Jam driver. He made his competition debut in the El Toro Loco Monster Jam truck on November 6th in Hampton, VA.

== Personal life ==
Speer's father, Tim, is also a drag boat racer in addition to being the owner of the ProBoat service center. His girlfriend, Joslynn Wilde, operates his social media account and website.

== Motorsports career results ==
=== ARCA Menards Series ===
(key) (Bold – Pole position awarded by qualifying time. Italics – Pole position earned by points standings or practice time. * – Most laps led.)

ARCA Menards Series results
Year	Team	No.	Make	1	2	3	4	5	6	7	8	9	10	11	12	13	14	15	16	17	18	19	20	21	AMSC	Pts	Ref
2010	TAS Racing	10	Chevy	DAY	PBE	SLM	TEX	TAL	TOL	POC	MCH	IOW	MFD	POC	BLN	NJE	ISF	CHI	DSF	TOL	SLM	KAN	CAR; 32		129th	70	
2011	TAS Racing	11	Ford	DAY	TAL	SLM	TOL	NJE	CHI	POC	MCH	WIN	BLN	IOW	IRP	POC	ISF; 24	MAD	DSF; 15	SLM	KAN	TOL			75th	265	
2012	TAS Racing	18	Chevy	DAY	MOB	SLM	TAL; 36	TOL	ELK	POC	MCH	WIN	NJE	IOW	CHI	IRP	POC	BLN							74th	270	
2012	TAS Racing	10	Chevy																ISF; 7	MAD	SLM	DSF	KAN		74th	270	
2013	TAS Racing	10	Chevy	DAY	MOB; 19	SLM	TAL	TOL	ELK	POC	MCH	ROA	WIN	CHI	NJE	POC	BLN	ISF; 12	MAD	DSF; 25	IOW	SLM	KEN	KAN	61st	410	
2014	TAS Racing	10	Chevy	DAY	MOB	SLM	TAL	TOL	NJE	POC	MCH	ELK	WIN	CHI	IRP	POC	BLN	ISF	MAD	DSF; 20	SLM	KEN	KAN		115th	130	
2016	Fast Track Racing Enterprises	10	Chevy	DAY	NSH	SLM	TAL	TOL	NJE	POC	MCH	MAD	WIN	IOW	IRP	POC	BLN	ISF; 7	DSF; 7	SLM	CHI	KEN	KAN		69th	390	
2017	Fast Track Racing Enterprises	10	Toyota	DAY	NSH	SLM	TAL	TOL	ELK	POC	MCH	MAD	IOW	IRP	POC	WIN	ISF; 7	ROA	DSF; 14	SLM	CHI	KEN	KAN		53rd	355	
2019	Fast Track Racing Enterprises	11	Toyota	DAY	FIF	SLM	TAL	NSH	TOL	CLT	POC	MCH	MAD	GTW	CHI	ELK	IOW	POC	ISF	DSF; 17	SLM	IRP	KAN		71st	145	
