= Bobby Grewohl =

American racing driver (born 1986)

- Born: May 23, 1986 (age 40); Hollister, California, U.S.

ARCA Menards Series career
- 3 races run over 2 years
- Best finish: 60th (2013)
- First race: 2013 Kansas Lottery 98.9 (Kansas)
- Last race: 2014 International Motorsports Hall of Fame 200 (Talladega
Wins	Top tens	Poles
0	0	0

ARCA Menards Series West career
- 1 race run over 1 year
- Best finish: 71st (2010)
- First race: 2010 Toyota / NAPA Auto Parts 150 (Roseville)
Wins	Top tens	Poles
0	0	0
- Statistics up to date as of February 11, 2025.

Bobby Grewohl (born May 23, 1986) is an American former professional stock car racing driver who has competed in the ARCA Racing Series and the NASCAR K&N Pro Series West.

Grewohl has also competed in series such as the USAC National Midget Series, the USAC Western States Midget Series, the USAC California North Ford Focus Midget Car Series, and the NASCAR Advance Auto Parts Weekly Series.

== Motorsports results ==
=== NASCAR ===
(key) (Bold - Pole position awarded by qualifying time. Italics - Pole position earned by points standings or practice time. * – Most laps led.)

==== K&N Pro Series West ====
NASCAR K&N Pro Series West results
Year	Team	No.	Make	1	2	3	4	5	6	7	8	9	10	11	12	NKNPSWC	Pts	Ref
2010	Bill McAnally Racing	10	Toyota	AAS	PHO	IOW	DCS	SON	IRW	PIR	MRP	CNS	MMP	AAS; 23	PHO	71st	94	

=== ARCA Racing Series ===
(key) (Bold – Pole position awarded by qualifying time. Italics – Pole position earned by points standings or practice time. * – Most laps led.)

ARCA Racing Series results
Year	Team	No.	Make	1	2	3	4	5	6	7	8	9	10	11	12	13	14	15	16	17	18	19	20	21	ARSC	Pts	Ref
2013	Universe Racing	86	Chevy	DAY	MOB	SLM	TAL	TOL	ELK	POC	MCH	ROA	WIN	CHI	NJM	POC	BLN	ISF	MAD	DSF	IOW	SLM	KEN	KAN; 12	60th	420	
2014	Universe Racing	86	Chevy	DAY; 24	MOB; Wth	SLM	TAL; 35	TOL	NJE	POC	MCH	ELK	WIN	CHI	IRP	POC	BLN	ISF	MAD	DSF	SLM	KEN	KAN		94th	165	
