= Jay Curry =

American racing driver

- Born: November 10, 1993 (age 33); Homosassa, Florida, U.S.

ARCA Menards Series career
- 3 races run over 1 year
- Best finish: 49th (2014)
- First race: 2014 Menards 200 Presented by Federated Car Care (Toledo)
- Last race: 2014 Pocono ARCA 200 (Pocono)
Wins	Top tens	Poles
0	0	0
- Statistics up to date as of February 11, 2025.

Jay Curry (born November 10, 1993) is an American former professional stock car racing driver who has previously competed in the ARCA Racing Series for three races in 2014, getting a best finish of 21st at New Jersey Motorsports Park.

== Motorsports results ==
=== ARCA Racing Series ===
(key) (Bold – Pole position awarded by qualifying time. Italics – Pole position earned by points standings or practice time. * – Most laps led.)

ARCA Racing Series results
Year	Team	No.	Make	1	2	3	4	5	6	7	8	9	10	11	12	13	14	15	16	17	18	19	20	ARSC	Pts	Ref
2014	Carter 2 Motorsports	40	Dodge	DAY	MOB	SLM	TAL	TOL; 22	NJE; 21	POC; 23	MCH	ELK	WIN	CHI	IRP	POC	BLN	ISF	MAD	DSF	SLM	KEN	KAN	49th	360	
