= Cole Powell =

Canadian racing driver (born 1992)

- Born: July 9, 1992 (age 34); Mount Brydges, Ontario, Canada

ARCA Menards Series career
- 5 races run over 3 years
- Best finish: 48th (2015)
- First race: 2014 Lucas Oil 200 presented by MAVTV American Real (Daytona)
- Last race: 2016 Lucas Oil 200 driven by General Tire (Daytona)
Wins	Top tens	Poles
0	1	0
- Statistics up to date as of August 7, 2024.

Cole Powell (born July 9, 1992) is a Canadian professional stock car racing driver who previously competed in the NASCAR Whelen Modified Tour, NASCAR Pinty's Series, and ARCA Racing Series.

Powell has also competed in series such as the ACT Late Model Tour, the CRA JEGS All-Stars Tour, the OSCAAR Modified Series, the APC United Late Model Series, and the World Series of Asphalt Stock Car Racing.

== Motorsports results ==
=== NASCAR ===
(key) (Bold – Pole position awarded by qualifying time. Italics – Pole position earned by points standings or practice time. * – Most laps led.)

==== Pinty's Series ====
NASCAR Pinty's Series results
Year	Team	No.	Make	1	2	3	4	5	6	7	8	9	10	11	12	13	Rank	Points	Ref
2018	Team 3 Red Racing	3	Chevy	MSP; 6	JUK; 2	ACD; 4	TOR; 12	SAS; 2	SAS; 1	EIR; 4	CTR; 11	RIS; 2	MSP; 14	ASE; 3	**NHA**; 4	JUK; 6	4th	508	
2019	DJK Racing	73	Dodge	MSP	JUK	ACD	TOR	SAS	SAS	EIR	CTR	RIS	MSP	ASE	NHA; 6	JUK; 17	33rd	65	
2020	Jacombs Racing	32	Ford	SUN	SUN	FLA	FLA	JUK; 15	JUK; 12								17th	61	
2021	Jacombs Racing	36	Ford	SUN	SUN	CTR	ICAR	ACD	ACD	MSP	MSP	FLA; 5	FLA; 21	DEL; 19			26th	87	

==== Whelen Modified Tour ====
NASCAR Whelen Modified Tour results
Year	Car owner	No.	Make	1	2	3	4	5	6	7	8	9	10	11	12	13	14	15	16	NWMTC	Pts	Ref
2011	Todd Powell	73	Chevy	TMP	STA	STA	MND	TMP	NHA	RIV	STA	NHA	BRI	DEL; 16	TMP	LRP	NHA	STA	TMP	47th	115	
2012	Todd Powell	73	Chevy	TMP	STA	MND	STA	WFD	NHA	STA	TMP	BRI	TMP	RIV	NHA; 16	STA	TMP; 31			37th	41	
2013	Todd Powell	73	Chevy	TMP; 19	STA; 19	STA; 20	WFD; 13	RIV; 14	NHA; 11	MND; 12	STA; 9	TMP; 16	BRI; 20	RIV; 28	NHA; 15	STA; 23	TMP; 29			16th	368	
2014	Todd Powell	73	Chevy	TMP	STA	STA	WFD	RIV	NHA; DNQ	MND	STA	TMP	BRI; 13	NHA; 24	STA	TMP				31st	64	
2015	Todd Powell	73	Chevy	TMP	STA	WAT	STA	TMP	RIV	NHA; 35	MON	STA	TMP	BRI	RIV	NHA	STA	TMP		59th	9	

==== Whelen Southern Modified Tour ====
NASCAR Whelen Southern Modified Tour results
Year	Car owner	No.	Make	1	2	3	4	5	6	7	8	9	10	11	12	13	14	NSWMTC	Pts	Ref
2012	Todd Powell	73	Chevy	CRW	CRW	SBO	CRW	CRW; 17	BGS; 3	BRI; 9	LGY	THO; 10	CRW	CLT				22nd	137	
2013	Todd Powell	73	Chevy	CRW; 7	SNM	SBO	CRW	CRW	BGS; 3	BRI	LGY	CRW	CRW	SNM	CLT; 18			21st	104	
2014	Todd Powell	73	Chevy	CRW; 18	SNM	SBO	LGY	CRW	BGS; 2	BRI	LGY	CRW	SBO	SNM	CRW	CRW; 13	CLT; 7	19th	136	

=== ARCA Racing Series ===
(key) (Bold – Pole position awarded by qualifying time. Italics – Pole position earned by points standings or practice time. * – Most laps led.)

ARCA Racing Series results
Year	Team	No.	Make	1	2	3	4	5	6	7	8	9	10	11	12	13	14	15	16	17	18	19	20	ARSC	Pts	Ref
2014	Empire Racing	8	Ford	DAY; 39	MOB	SLM	TAL	TOL	NJE	POC	MCH	ELK	WIN	CHI	IRP	POC	BLN	ISF	MAD	DSF	SLM	KEN	KAN	146th	35	
2015	Team BCR Racing	88	Ford	DAY; 20	MOB	NSH	SLM																	48th	485	
2015	Lira Motorsports	58	Ford					TAL; 3	TOL	NJE	POC	MCH; 18	CHI	WIN	IOW	IRP	POC	BLN	ISF	DSF	SLM	KEN	KAN	48th	485	
2016	Mason Mitchell Motorsports	78	Chevy	DAY; 34	NSH	SLM	TAL	TOL	NJE	POC	MCH	MAD	WIN	IOW	IRP	POC	BLN	ISF	DSF	SLM	CHI	KEN	KAN	132nd	60	
