= Tim Viens =

American racing driver (born 1976)

- Born: Timothy Neil Viens; October 10, 1976 (age 50); South Hero, Vermont, U.S.

NASCAR O'Reilly Auto Parts Series career
- 5 races run over 4 years
- 2024 position: 74th
- Best finish: 74th (2024)
- First race: 2015 Ford EcoBoost 300 (Homestead)
- Last race: 2024 Wawa 250 (Daytona)
Wins	Top tens	Poles
0	0	0

NASCAR FedEx Freight Truck Series career
- 15 races run over 4 years
- 2023 position: 82nd
- Best finish: 43rd (2020)
- First race: 2015 Lucas Oil 200 (Dover)
- Last race: 2023 Heart of America 200 (Kansas)
Wins	Top tens	Poles
0	0	0

ARCA Menards Series career
- 19 races run over 4 years
- Best finish: 23rd (2014)
- First race: 2014 Lucas Oil 200 presented by MAVTV American Real (Daytona)
- Last race: 2025 General Tire 150 (Phoenix)
Wins	Top tens	Poles
0	0	0

ARCA Menards Series West career
- 1 race run over 1 year
- First race: 2025 General Tire 150 (Phoenix)
Wins	Top tens	Poles
0	0	0
- Statistics up to date as of March 8, 2025.

Timothy Neil Viens (born October 10, 1976) is an American professional stock car racing driver and team owner. He last competed part-time in the ARCA Menards Series, driving the No. 31 Toyota Camry for Rise Motorsports. He has also competed in the NASCAR Xfinity Series and NASCAR Craftsman Truck Series.

== Racing career ==
=== ARCA ===
Viens made his ARCA debut in 2012 at Salem driving the No. 67 Dodge for Carter 2 Motorsports, but finished last in the race as a did not start. Viens did not make any other starts that year or in 2013.

He returned to the team in 2014 for what appeared to be a full season run. He started the season in their No. 97 car, and when he did not qualify for the races at Toledo Speedway and New Jersey Motorsports Park, he moved into the Wayne Peterson Racing No. 06 Chevrolet. After seven races, Viens did not return to C2M and was without a ride until the Peterson team picked him back up for three starts. He ran one race in each of their cars: Chicago in the No. 06, Pocono in the No. 00, and Kansas in the No. 0.

In 2015, Viens returned to run part-time for Wayne Peterson and his team. He made a total of five starts that year, running Nashville, Talladega, both Pocono races, and Kentucky. In those five races, he drove all four Peterson cars at least once: the No. 00, the No. 0, the No. 06, and the No. 08. He did not finish in all of his starts. His most recent ARCA starts came in 2016, where he drove the WPR No. 06 at Daytona and Talladega.

On February 3, 2025, it was announced that Viens would return to the now-ARCA Menards Series to compete part-time in the No. 31 Toyota for Rise Motorsports.

=== Truck Series ===
Viens debuted in the Truck Series in 2015. He attempted 4 races in 2015 but failed to qualify for two. He withdrew from the 4th race he attempted in 2015. Viens made only one start in 2015. Viens returned in 2016, attempting 5 races and starting 3. He failed to qualify for one of them and withdrew from one. In 2017, Viens returned to drive the No. 1 truck for TJL Motorsports at Daytona, but failed to qualify. After not making another attempt in 2017, he returned in early with 2018 at Atlanta with Mike Harmon's No. 74, failing to qualify.

After originally announcing an effort with Mike Affarano Motorsports for the 2020 Daytona race, the team's hauler slid off a highway en route to the track and was not able to compete. After failing to qualify for Charlotte and Atlanta, Viens and the No. 03 were supposed to run at Homestead-Miami but the No. 03 failed pre-race inspection and NASCAR forced them to withdraw since the repairs could not be made at the track. After that incident, Viens and Mike Affarano Motorsports parted ways. Viens later joined CMI Motorsports for a part-time Truck schedule beginning at Pocono.

Viens would rejoin CMI Motorsports in 2021, initially stating he was running full time in the No. 83 truck. In his first attempt to qualify in the 2021 season at the NextEra Energy 250 at Daytona, while getting ready for his qualifying run, the driveshaft of his truck fell off the car, and thus Viens could not set a time and failed to qualify. Due to a combination of factors, including his DNQ, NASCAR's qualifying format for races without such sessions, lack of owner's points, and the number of cars entered, Viens DNQ'd again at the BrakeBest Select 159 at the Daytona International Speedway road course.

On May 26, 2021, Viens announced on social media that he would start up a new race team, called G2G Racing, and it would run its first race in 2022. He had purchased Kyle Busch Motorsports trucks the previous week.

=== Xfinity Series ===
He made his NASCAR Xfinity Series debut in the 2015 Ford EcoBoost 300 at Homestead-Miami Speedway for Mike Harmon Racing. During the race, he switched the ride with team owner Mike Harmon; as Viens started the race, he was credited with the 33rd-place finish. He returned to Miami three years later with Harmon but failed to make the field.

Later starts with MHR came in 2018, but failed to qualify, but ran other races in 2020, 2021, and 2022.

== Personal life ==
Viens is an alumnus of Glenville State College, where he played college football as a placekicker. Continuing his involvement in football after college, he tried out for the NFL, but was unsuccessful. After the unsuccessful endeavor, Tim would move to Daytona Beach, Florida and play for the Daytona Beach Thunder for a professional arena football league. He later founded the Vermont Bucks indoor football team in 2016 and, when the league in which it was planning to compete suspended operations prior to the Bucks' inaugural season, established the Can-Am Indoor Football League for the 2017 season. The Can-Am league was based around the Bucks, a few traveling teams Viens established such as the Boston Blaze, and established semi-professional football teams. Viens then created the Atlanta Havoc indoor football team for in the American Arena League (AAL), of which he was also a co-founder, and sold the Bucks to a local ownership group to also play in the AAL. The Bucks would end up folding before playing a game in the league and Viens would also step away from his roles in the Havoc and AAL on April 14, 2018.

== Motorsports career results ==
=== Racing career summary ===
Season	Series	Team	Races	Wins	Top 5	Top 10	Points	Position
2012	ARCA Racing Series	Carter 2 Motorsports	0	0	0	0	0	154th
2014	ARCA Racing Series	Carter 2 Motorsports	5	0	0	0	1310	23rd
2014	ARCA Racing Series	Wayne Peterson Racing	5	0	0	0	1310	23rd
2015	ARCA Racing Series	Wayne Peterson Racing	4	0	0	0	410	55th
2015	NASCAR Camping World Truck Series	Mike Affarano Motorsports	0	0	0	0	21	68th
2015	NASCAR Camping World Truck Series	Mike Harmon Racing	1	0	0	0	21	68th
2015	NASCAR Xfinity Series	Mike Harmon Racing	1	0	0	0	0	NC†
2016	ARCA Racing Series	Wayne Peterson Racing	2	0	0	0	115	111th
2016	NASCAR Camping World Truck Series	Mike Harmon Racing	2	0	0	0	15	63rd
2017	NASCAR Camping World Truck Series	TJL Motorsports	0	0	0	0	0	102nd
2018	NASCAR Camping World Truck Series	Mike Harmon Racing	0	0	0	0	0	NC†
2018	NASCAR Xfinity Series	Mike Harmon Racing	0	0	0	0	0	112th
2020	NASCAR Gander Outdoors Truck Series	Mike Affarano Motorsports	0	0	0	0	74	43rd
2020	NASCAR Gander Outdoors Truck Series	CMI Motorsports	10	0	0	0	74	43rd
2020	NASCAR Xfinity Series	Mike Harmon Racing	2	0	0	0	0	NC†
2021	NASCAR Camping World Truck Series	CMI Motorsports	0	0	0	0	0	117th
2021	NASCAR Xfinity Series	Mike Harmon Racing	1	0	0	0	0	NC†
2022	NASCAR Camping World Truck Series	G2G Racing	0	0	0	0	0	N/A
2022	NASCAR Xfinity Series	Mike Harmon Racing	0	0	0	0	0	NC†
2023	NASCAR Craftsman Truck Series	G2G Racing	1	0	0	0	1	82nd
2024	NASCAR Xfinity Series	Mike Harmon Racing	1	0	0	0	2	74th
2025	ARCA Menards Series West	Rise Motorsports	1	0	0	0	24	71st
2025	ARCA Menards Series	Rise Motorsports	2	0	0	0	49	80th

=== NASCAR ===
(key) (Bold – Pole position awarded by qualifying time. Italics – Pole position earned by points standings or practice time. * – Most laps led.)

==== Xfinity Series ====
NASCAR Xfinity Series results
Year	Team	No.	Make	1	2	3	4	5	6	7	8	9	10	11	12	13	14	15	16	17	18	19	20	21	22	23	24	25	26	27	28	29	30	31	32	33	NXSC	Pts	Ref
2015	Mike Harmon Racing	74	Dodge	DAY	ATL	LVS	PHO	CAL	TEX	BRI	RCH	TAL	IOW	CLT	DOV	MCH	CHI	DAY	KEN	NHA	IND	IOW	GLN	MOH	BRI	ROA	DAR	RCH	CHI	KEN	DOV	CLT	KAN	TEX	PHO	HOM; 33	114th	0^{1}	
2018	Mike Harmon Racing	74	Chevy	DAY	ATL	LVS	PHO	CAL	TEX	BRI	RCH	TAL	DOV	CLT	POC	MCH	IOW	CHI	DAY	KEN	NHA	IOW	GLN	MOH	BRI	ROA	DAR	IND	LVS	RCH	CLT	DOV	KAN	TEX	PHO	HOM; DNQ	112th	0	
2020	Mike Harmon Racing	47	Chevy	DAY	LVS	CAL	PHO	DAR	CLT	BRI	ATL	HOM	HOM	TAL; 36	POC	IND	KEN	KEN	TEX	KAN	ROA	DAY	DOV	DOV	DAY; 18	DAR	RCH	RCH	BRI	LVS	TAL	CLT	KAN	TEX	MAR	PHO	83rd	0^{1}	
2021	Mike Harmon Racing	74	Chevy	DAY	DAY	HOM	LVS	PHO	ATL	MAR	TAL	DAR	DOV	COA	CLT	MOH	TEX	NSH	POC	ROA	ATL	NHA	GLN	IND	MCH	DAY; 29	DAR	RCH	BRI	LVS	TAL	CLT	TEX	KAN	MAR	PHO	99th	0^{1}	
2022	Mike Harmon Racing	74	Chevy	DAY; DNQ	CAL	LVS	PHO	ATL	COA	RCH	MAR	TAL	DOV	DAR	TEX	CLT	PIR	NSH	ROA	ATL	NHA	POC	IND	MCH	GLN												N/A	0^{1}	
2022	Mike Harmon Racing	47	Chevy																							DAY; DNQ	DAR	KAN	BRI	TEX	TAL	CLT	LVS	HOM	MAR	PHO	N/A	0^{1}	
2024	Mike Harmon Racing	74	Chevy	DAY	ATL	LVS	PHO	COA	RCH	MAR	TEX	TAL	DOV	DAR	CLT	PIR	SON	IOW	NHA	NSH	CSC	POC	IND	MCH	DAY; 35	DAR	ATL	GLN	BRI	KAN	TAL	ROV	LVS	HOM	MAR	PHO	74th	2	

==== Craftsman Truck Series ====
NASCAR Craftsman Truck Series results
Year	Team	No.	Make	1	2	3	4	5	6	7	8	9	10	11	12	13	14	15	16	17	18	19	20	21	22	23	NCTC	Pts	Ref
2015	Mike Harmon Racing	74	Chevy	DAY	ATL	MAR	KAN	CLT	DOV; 23	TEX	GTW	IOW	KEN	ELD													68th	21	
2015	Mike Affarano Motorsports	03	Chevy												POC; DNQ	MCH; DNQ	BRI	MSP	CHI	NHA	LVS	TAL	MAR	TEX	PHO	HOM	68th	21	
2016	Mike Harmon Racing	74	Chevy	DAY	ATL; DNQ	MAR	KAN	DOV	CLT											NHA; 26							63rd	15	
2016	Mike Harmon Racing	86	Chevy							TEX; 29	IOW	GTW	KEN	ELD	POC	BRI	MCH	MSP	CHI								63rd	15	
2016	Mike Harmon Racing	66	Chevy																		LVS; 29	TAL	MAR	TEX	PHO	HOM	63rd	15	
2017	TJL Motorsports	1	Chevy	DAY; DNQ	ATL	MAR	KAN	CLT	DOV	TEX	GTW	IOW	KEN	ELD	POC	MCH	BRI	MSP	CHI	NHA	LVS	TAL	MAR	TEX	PHO	HOM	102nd	0	
2018	Mike Harmon Racing	74	Chevy	DAY	ATL; DNQ	LVS	MAR	DOV	KAN	CLT	TEX	IOW	GTW	CHI	KEN	ELD	POC	MCH	BRI	MSP	LVS	TAL	MAR	TEX	PHO	HOM	115th	0^{1}	
2020	Mike Affarano Motorsports	03	Chevy	DAY	LVS	CLT; DNQ	ATL; DNQ	HOM; Wth																			43rd	74	
2020	CMI Motorsports	83	Chevy						POC; 29						DAY; 24	DOV; 31	GTW	DAR	RCH; 35	BRI	LVS; 33	TAL					43rd	74	
2020	CMI Motorsports	49	Chevy							KEN; 35	TEX; 26	KAN	KAN	MCH; 26									KAN; 32	TEX; 37	MAR	PHO	43rd	74	
2021	CMI Motorsports	83	Chevy	DAY; DNQ	DAY; DNQ	LVS	ATL	BRI	RCH	KAN	DAR	COA	CLT	TEX	NSH	POC	KNX	GLN	GTW	DAR	BRI	LVS	TAL	MAR	PHO		117th	-	
2022	G2G Racing	46	Toyota	DAY	LVS	ATL	COA	MAR	BRI	DAR	KAN	TEX	CLT	GTW	SON	KNO	NSH	MOH	POC	IRP	RCH	KAN	BRI	TAL; DNQ	HOM	PHO	N/A	0	
2023	G2G Racing	47	Toyota	DAY	LVS	ATL	COA	TEX	BRI	MAR	KAN; 36	DAR	NWS	CLT	GTW	NSH	MOH	POC	RCH	IRP	MLW	KAN	BRI	TAL	HOM	PHO	82nd	1	

^{*} Season still in progress
^{1} Ineligible for series points

=== ARCA Menards Series ===
(key) (Bold – Pole position awarded by qualifying time. Italics – Pole position earned by points standings or practice time. * – Most laps led.)

ARCA Menards Series results
Year	Team	No.	Make	1	2	3	4	5	6	7	8	9	10	11	12	13	14	15	16	17	18	19	20	AMSC	Pts	Ref
2012	Carter 2 Motorsports	67	Dodge	DAY	MOB	SLM	TAL	TOL	ELK	POC	MCH	WIN	NJE	IOW	CHI	IRP	POC	BLN	ISF	MAD	SLM; DNS	DSF	KAN	154th	0	
2014	Carter 2 Motorsports	97	Dodge	DAY; 22	MOB; 23	SLM; 26	TAL; 23	TOL; DNQ	NJE; DNQ	POC; 30	MCH	ELK	WIN											23rd	1310	
2014	Wayne Peterson Racing	06	Chevy					TOL; 25	NJE; 20															23rd	1310	
2014	Wayne Peterson Racing	06	Ford											CHI; 21	IRP									23rd	1310	
2014	Wayne Peterson Racing	00	Chevy													POC; 25	BLN	ISF	MAD	DSF	SLM	KEN		23rd	1310	
2014	Wayne Peterson Racing	0	Ford																				KAN; 33	23rd	1310	
2015	Wayne Peterson Racing	0	Ford	DAY	MOB	NSH; 26	SLM																	55th	410	
2015	Wayne Peterson Racing	00	Ford					TAL; 35	TOL	NJE												KEN; 27	KAN	55th	410	
2015	Wayne Peterson Racing	08	Chevy								POC; 31	MCH	CHI	WIN	IOW	IRP								55th	410	
2015	Wayne Peterson Racing	06	Dodge														POC; 29	BLN	ISF	DSF	SLM			55th	410	
2016	Wayne Peterson Racing	06	Chevy	DAY; 26	NSH	SLM																		111th	115	
2016	Wayne Peterson Racing	0	Chevy				TAL; 35	TOL	NJE	POC	MCH	MAD	WIN	IOW	IRP	POC	BLN	ISF	DSF	SLM	CHI	KEN	KAN	111th	115	
2025	Rise Motorsports	31	Toyota	DAY; 19	PHO; 20	TAL	KAN	CLT	MCH	BLN	ELK	LRP	DOV	IRP	IOW	GLN	ISF	MAD	DSF	BRI	SLM	KAN	TOL	80th	49	

==== ARCA Menards Series West ====
ARCA Menards Series West results
Year	Team	No.	Make	1	2	3	4	5	6	7	8	9	10	11	12	AMSWC	Pts	Ref
2025	Rise Motorsports	31	Toyota	KER	PHO; 20	TUC	CNS	KER	SON	TRI	PIR	AAS	MAD	LVS	PHO	71st	24	
