= Scott Sheldon (racing driver) =

American racing driver

- Born: January 27, 1978 (age 48); Las Vegas, Nevada, U.S.

ARCA Menards Series career
- 3 races run over 2 years
- Best finish: 61st (2015)
- First race: 2014 International Motorsports Hall of Fame 200 (Talladega)
- Last race: 2015 International Motorsports Hall of Fame 200 (Talladega)
Wins	Top tens	Poles
0	2	0
- Statistics up to date as of February 11, 2025.

Scott Sheldon (born January 27, 1978) is an American former professional stock car racing driver who competed in the ARCA Racing Series from 2014 to 2015.

== Motorsports results ==
=== ARCA Racing Series ===
(key) (Bold – Pole position awarded by qualifying time. Italics – Pole position earned by points standings or practice time. * – Most laps led.)

ARCA Racing Series results
Year	Team	No.	Make	1	2	3	4	5	6	7	8	9	10	11	12	13	14	15	16	17	18	19	20	ARSC	Pts	Ref
2014	GMS Racing	20	Chevy	DAY; QL^{†}	MOB	SLM	TAL; 13	TOL	NJE	POC	MCH	ELK	WIN	CHI	IRP	POC	BLN	ISF	MAD	DSF	SLM	KEN	KAN	85th	190	
2015	GMS Racing	20	Chevy	DAY; 8	MOB	NSH	SLM	TAL; 7	TOL	NJE	POC	MCH	CHI	WIN	IOW	IRP	POC	BLN	ISF	DSF	SLM	KEN	KAN	61st	390	
^{†} – Qualified but replaced by Spencer Gallagher
