= Bill Catania =

American professional stock car driver

- Nationality: American
- Born: April 2, 1976 (age 50) Westfield, New York, U.S.
- Debut season: 2013
- Starts: 16
- Championships: 0
- Wins: 0
- Podiums: 0
- Poles: 0
- Best finish: 16th in 2014
- Statistics up to date as of November 1, 2022.

William Marion Catania (born April 2, 1976) is an American professional stock car racing driver and entrepreneur. He has competed in the ARCA Menards Series from 2013 to 2015. Catania and his wife Lisa bought Stateline Speedway in November 2024.

== Racing career ==
Catania grew up as the son of Bill Catania Sr. who was a frequent competitor at Stateline Speedway.

In 2006, Catania would attempt to make his ARCA Re/Max Series driving the No. 10 Ford for Andy Belmont Racing at Toledo Speedway, but failed to qualify for the event. He would attempt the season opener at Daytona International Speedway driving with Belmont, but would not qualify for that event as well.

Catania would return and make his debut in the now ARCA Racing Series in 2013, driving three races in his self-owned No. 18 Ford with a best finish of 17th on his debut at Berlin Raceway. For 2014, now running in a Chevrolet, he would run 12 of the 20 races on the schedule, earning his first top-ten in his penultimate race of the year at Salem Speedway. He would make one start the 2015 season, running at Daytona in a collaboration with Noel Saunders and Roo Motorsports, and finished 27th on the lead lap. This would be his most recent appearance in ARCA competition, although he has run in the 602 Limited Series and the Carolina Pro Late Model Series, with his most recent start coming in 2021 in the latter series.

== Business career ==
Catania founded and is the CEO of OneRail, a final mile logistics orchestration solution, as well as M-Dot, a cloud-based digital coupon platform that was acquired by Inmar, Inc in 2011. He also founded RaceFan Inc. in this senior year at Cornell University.

== Personal life ==
Catania attended and graduated from Cornell University.

== Motorsports results ==
=== ARCA Racing Series ===
(key) (Bold – Pole position awarded by qualifying time. Italics – Pole position earned by points standings or practice time. * – Most laps led.)

ARCA Racing Series results
Year	Team	No.	Make	1	2	3	4	5	6	7	8	9	10	11	12	13	14	15	16	17	18	19	20	21	22	23	AMSC	Pts	Ref
2006	Andy Belmont Racing	10	Ford	DAY	NSH	SLM	WIN	KEN	TOL	POC	MCH	KAN	KEN	BLN	POC	GTW	NSH	MCH	ISF	MIL	TOL; DNQ	DSF	CHI	SLM	TAL	IOW	N/A	0	
2007	Andy Belmont Racing	10	Ford	DAY; DNQ	USA	NSH	SLM	KAN	WIN	KEN	TOL	IOW	POC	MCH	BLN	KEN	POC	NSH	ISF	MIL	GTW	DSF	CHI	SLM	TAL	TOL	N/A	0	
2013	Catania Racing	18	Ford	DAY	MOB	SLM	TAL	TOL	ELK	POC	MCH	ROA	WIN	CHI	NJM	POC	BLN; 17	ISF; 26	MAD	DSF	IOW	SLM; 20	KEN	KAN			67th	375	
2014	Catania Racing	18	Chevy	DAY	MOB	SLM; 17	TAL	TOL; 16	NJM	POC; 21	MCH; 16	ELK; 13	WIN	CHI; 15	IRP	POC; 18	BLN; 15	ISF; Wth	MAD; 18	DSF; 14	SLM; 9	KEN	KAN; 16				16th	1820	
2015	Roo Motorsports	18	Ford	DAY; 27	MOB	NSH	SLM	TAL	TOL	NJE	POC	MCH	CHI	WIN	IOW	IRP	POC	BLN	ISF	DSF	SLM	KEN	KAN				127th	95	
