= Dave Savicki =

American racing driver

- Born: March 15, 1955 (age 71); Daytona Beach, Florida, U.S.

ARCA Menards Series career
- 8 races run over 4 years
- Best finish: 66th (2013)
- First race: 2008 Cayuga ARCA Re/Max 250 (Cayuga)
- Last race: 2014 Menards 200 Presented by Federated Car Care (Toledo)
Wins	Top tens	Poles
0	0	0
- Statistics up to date as of January 20, 2025.

Dave Savicki (born March 15, 1955) is an American former professional stock car racing driver who has previously competed in the ARCA Racing Series from 2008 to 2014.

Savicki also competed in the FASCAR Pro Modified Tour and the World Series of Asphalt Stock Car Racing.

== Motorsports results ==
=== ARCA Racing Series ===
(key) (Bold – Pole position awarded by qualifying time. Italics – Pole position earned by points standings or practice time. * – Most laps led.)

ARCA Racing Series results
Year	Team	No.	Make	1	2	3	4	5	6	7	8	9	10	11	12	13	14	15	16	17	18	19	20	21	ARSC	Pts	Ref
2008	Allgaier Motorsports	15	Chevy	DAY	SLM	IOW	KAN	CAR	KEN	TOL	POC	MCH	CAY; 30	KEN	BLN	POC	NSH	ISF	DSF	CHI	SLM	NJE	TAL	TOL	140th	80	
2011	Allgaier Motorsports	16	Dodge	DAY	TAL	SLM	TOL	NJE	CHI; 28	POC	MCH	WIN	BLN	IOW	IRP	POC	ISF	MAD	DSF	SLM	KAN	TOL			149th	90	
2013	Roulo Brothers Racing	17	Ford	DAY	MOB	SLM; 27	TAL; DNQ	TOL	ELK	POC; 33	MCH; 28	ROA	WIN; 23	CHI	NJM	POC	BLN	ISF	MAD	DSF	IOW	SLM	KEN	KAN	66th	390	
2014	Roulo Brothers Racing	99	Ford	DAY	MOB; 26	SLM	TAL	TOL; 28	NJE	POC	MCH	ELK	WIN	CHI	IRP	POC	BLN	ISF	MAD	DSF	SLM	KEN	KAN		84th	190	
