= Galen Hassler =

American racing driver

- Born: October 10, 1984 (age 42); Columbia, Missouri, U.S.

ARCA Menards Series career
- 5 races run over 2 years
- Best finish: 79th (2013)
- First race: 2013 Lucas Oil 200 Presented by MAVTV (Daytona)
- Last race: 2014 ARCA 98.9 (Kansas)
| Wins | Top tens | Poles |
|---|---|---|
| 0 | 0 | 0 |
- Statistics up to date as of February 11, 2025.

Galen Hassler (born October 10, 1984) is an American professional stock car racing driver who has previously competed in the ARCA Racing Series from 2013 to 2014.

Hassler has also competed in series such as the Lucas Cattle Company United Late Model Association, the POWRi B-Mod Division, the United States Racing Association, and the USRA B-Mod Iron Man Challenge.

== Motorsports results ==
=== ARCA Racing Series ===
(key) (Bold – Pole position awarded by qualifying time. Italics – Pole position earned by points standings or practice time. * – Most laps led.)

ARCA Racing Series results
| Year | Team | No. | Make | 1 | 2 | 3 | 4 | 5 | 6 | 7 | 8 | 9 | 10 | 11 | 12 | 13 | 14 | 15 | 16 | 17 | 18 | 19 | 20 | 21 | ARSC | Pts | Ref |
|---|---|---|---|---|---|---|---|---|---|---|---|---|---|---|---|---|---|---|---|---|---|---|---|---|---|---|---|
| 2013 | Carter 2 Motorsports | 40 | Dodge | DAY; 32 | MOB | SLM | TAL; 20 | TOL | ELK | POC | MCH | ROA | WIN | | | | | | | | | | | | 79th | 295 | |
| 2013 | Roulo Brothers Racing | 99 | Ford | | | | | | | | | | | CHI; 27 | NJM | POC | BLN | ISF | MAD | DSF | IOW | SLM | KEN | KAN | 79th | 295 | |
| 2014 | Carter 2 Motorsports | 40 | Dodge | DAY | MOB | SLM | TAL | TOL | NJE | POC | MCH | ELK | WIN | CHI; 26 | IRP | POC | BLN | ISF | MAD | DSF | SLM | KEN | | | 114th | 130 | |
| 2014 | HARE Motorsports | 60 | Chevy | | | | | | | | | | | | | | | | | | | | KAN; 25 | | 114th | 130 | |
