= Justin Allison =

American professional stock car driver

- Nationality: American
- Born: June 25, 1992 (age 34) Salisbury, North Carolina, U.S.
- Debut season: 2013
- Starts: 11
- Championships: 0
- Wins: 1
- Podiums: 2
- Poles: 0
- Best finish: 19th in 2014
- Statistics up to date as of October 28, 2022.

Justin Allison (born June 25, 1992) is an American former professional stock car racing driver. He is the grandson of former Winston Cup Series driver Donnie Allison, and the great nephew of 1983 NASCAR Winston Cup Series champion Bobby Allison. He formerly competed in the ARCA Racing Series from 2013 to 2014, winning one race at Pocono Raceway in the latter year. Prior to this, he won the Allison Legacy Series title in 2010.

== Early life ==
Allison was born in Salisbury, North Carolina on June 25, 1992, and attended and graduated from West Rowan High School.

== Racing career ==
Allison first started racing at the age of five, competing in go-karts whilst working at his father's race shop. Allison would run in the Allison Legacy Series from 2006 to 2013, winning the championship in 2010, despite not winning a pole that year. He also ran in the PASS National Championship Super Late Model Series and the PASS South Super Late Model Series, as well as the X-1R Pro Cup Series.

In 2013, Allison would make his ARCA Racing Series debut at the Kansas Lottery 98.9 at Kansas Speedway driving the No. 88 Ford for Team BCR Racing, where he would start and finish eleventh.

For 2014, Team BCR Racing announced that Allison would run in a select number of races during the 2014 season, driving the team's No. 88 entry as a teammate to the team's main driver Grant Enfinger. After a testing session at the track, he would make his first start at the season opener at Daytona International Speedway, where he would start twelfth, but ultimately finished thirty-sixth due to being caught up in a multi-car crash on the 12th lap. After withdrawing from the second round at Mobile International Speedway, he would make his next start at Talladega Superspeedway, where he would finish a lap down in 19th. In his next race at Toledo Speedway, he would secure his first top-ten with a seventh-place finish after staying out early during an early caution period and after making a late pit stop on lap 130.

Allison would make his next start at Pocono Raceway, a track where he participated in a test a few days prior with the fastest time of 168.425 mph. He would qualify a career best third, and finished in fifth place, his first top-five finish. He would improve that at the next race at Michigan Speedway, where he would finish in third place behind Mason Mitchell and race winner Austin Theriault. His next race would be at Chicagoland Speedway, where he would ultimately start and finish eighth. He would then make his second short track race at Lucas Oil Raceway, where he would start fifth, but finish thirteenth three laps down to race winner Brandon Jones.

On the series' return to Pocono Raceway on August 1, 2014, Allison would start fifth. In the race, Allison would pit on lap 16 after a couple of cautions marred the early portion of the race, satisfying ARCA's rules that state that drivers must pit at least once before the halfway point of the race, which in this event was lap 40. Right before that lap, Brennan Poole and Justin Boston would pit, handing the lead to Allison, who was ahead of Will Kimmel, who was on the same strategy as Allison. Allison would ultimately hold off the challenge from Kimmel to score his first career ARCA Racing Series win by four-tenths. He became the third member of the Allison family to win an ARCA Racing Series race, and was the first by an Allison in a major stock car series event since Davey Allison won the Pontiac Excitement 400 at Richmond International Raceway in 1993.

Allison would run his next race at Kentucky Speedway, where he would finish seventh on the lead lap after starting ninth. His last race of the year would be at the season finale at Kansas Speedway, driving the No. 08 Ford in a car that he owned, as his normal ride was occupied by Charles Evans Jr. for the event. After starting 33rd and last due to qualifying being rained out, he would avoid many accidents to finish in ninth place, one lap down behind race winner Spencer Gallagher. He has not run in ARCA, or any other major stock car series, since 2014.

== Motorsports results ==
=== ARCA Racing Series ===
(key) (Bold – Pole position awarded by qualifying time. Italics – Pole position earned by points standings or practice time. * – Most laps led.)

ARCA Racing Series results
Year	Team	No.	Make	1	2	3	4	5	6	7	8	9	10	11	12	13	14	15	16	17	18	19	20	21	ARSC	Pts	Ref
2013	Team BCR Racing	88	Ford	DAY	MOB	SLM	TAL	TOL	ELK	POC	MCH	ROA	WIN	CHI	NJM	POC	BLN	ISF	MAD	DSF	IOW	SLM	KEN	KAN; 11	59th	425	
2014	Team BCR Racing	88	Ford	DAY; 36	MOB; Wth	SLM	TAL; 19	TOL; 7	NJE	POC; 5	MCH; 3	ELK	WIN	CHI; 8	IRP; 13	POC; 1	BLN	ISF	MAD	DSF	SLM	KEN; 7			19th	1785	
2014	Justin Allison Racing	08	Ford																				KAN; 9		19th	1785	
