= Charles Evans Jr. (racing driver) =

American racing driver

- Born: October 6, 1989 (age 37); Pasadena, Texas, U.S.

ARCA Menards Series career
- 10 races run over 4 years
- Best finish: 47th (2011)
- First race: 2011 Hantz Group 200 (Berlin)
- Last race: 2014 ARCA 98.9 (Kansas)
Wins	Top tens	Poles
0	1	0
- Statistics up to date as of January 22, 2025.

Charles Evans Jr. (born October 6, 1989) is an American former professional stock car racing driver who has previously competed in the ARCA Racing Series from 2011 to 2014.

Evans also competed in the NASCAR Advance Auto Parts Weekly Series.

== Motorsports results ==
=== ARCA Racing Series ===
(key) (Bold – Pole position awarded by qualifying time. Italics – Pole position earned by points standings or practice time. * – Most laps led.)

ARCA Racing Series results
Year	Team	No.	Make	1	2	3	4	5	6	7	8	9	10	11	12	13	14	15	16	17	18	19	20	21	ARSC	Pts	Ref
2011	Team BCR Racing	99	Ford	DAY	TAL	SLM	TOL	NJE	CHI	POC	MCH	WIN	BLN; 16	IOW	IRP	POC	ISF	MAD; 17	DSF	SLM	KAN; DNQ	TOL; 9			47th	505	
2012	Team BCR Racing	09	Ford	DAY	MOB; 21	SLM; 28	TAL	TOL; 17	ELK	POC	MCH	WIN	NJE	IOW	CHI	IRP	POC	BLN	ISF	MAD	SLM	DSF	KAN		60th	360	
2013	Team BCR Racing	09	Ford	DAY	MOB; 12	SLM; 15	TAL	TOL; 22	ELK	POC	MCH	ROA	WIN	CHI	NJM	POC	BLN	ISF	MAD	DSF	IOW	SLM	KEN	KAN	58th	445	
2014	Team BCR Racing	88	Ford	DAY	MOB	SLM	TAL	TOL	NJE	POC	MCH	ELK	WIN	CHI	IRP	POC	BLN	ISF	MAD	DSF	SLM	KEN	KAN; 14		100th	160	
