= Samuel Hunt House =

Historic house in Wisconsin, United States

- U.S. National Register of Historic Places
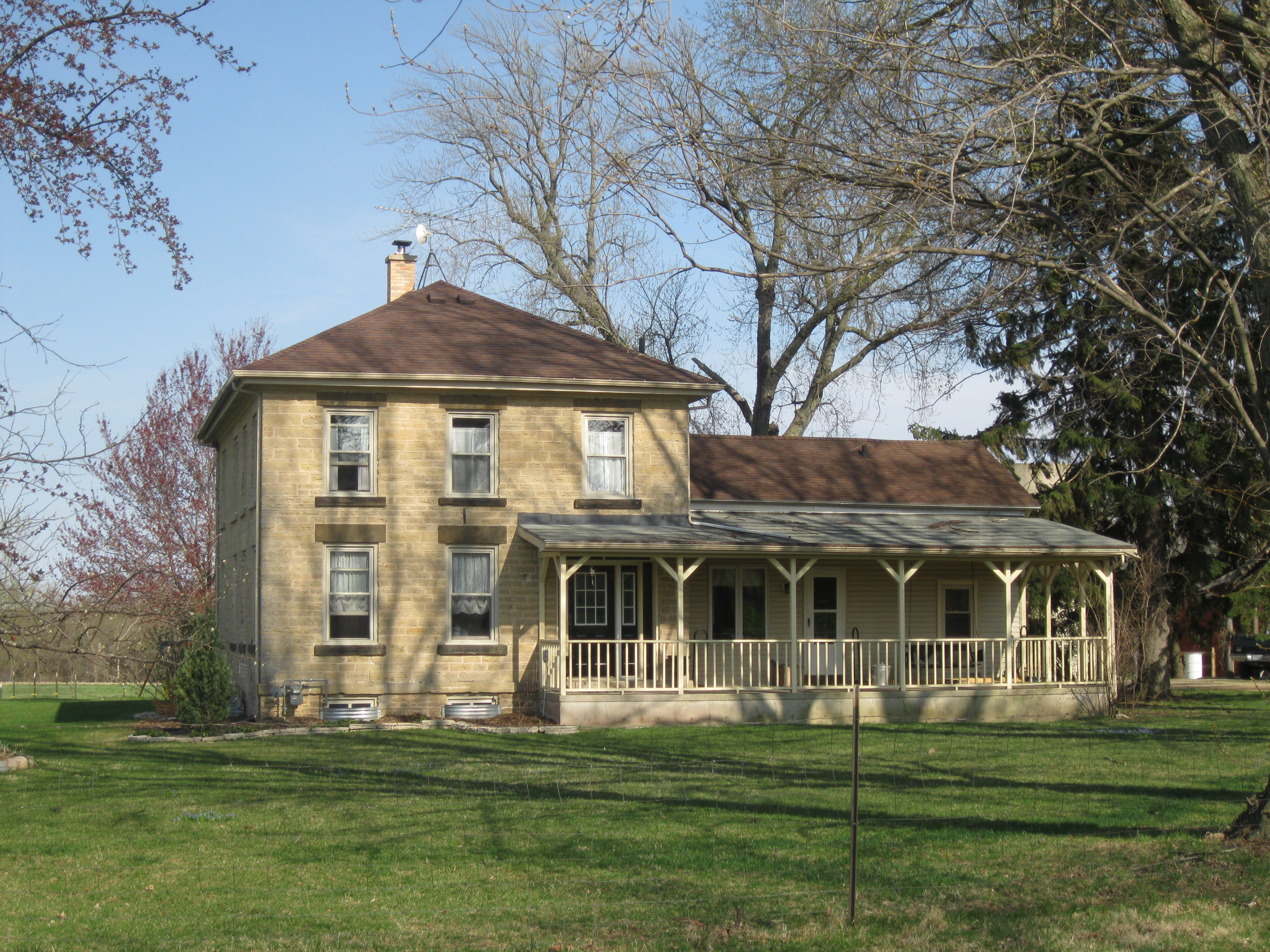
- Samuel Hunt House
- Location: 632 Center Rd., Rutland, Wisconsin
- Coordinates: 42°52′51″N 89°18′35″W
- Area: less than one acre
- Built: 1855
- Architect: Sereno W. Graves
- Architectural style: Greek Revival, Italianate
- MPS: Graves Stone Buildings TR
- NRHP reference No.: 82000652
- Added to NRHP: September 30, 1982

The Samuel Hunt House is located in Rutland, Wisconsin.

== History ==
The house was designed by Sereno W. Graves, later a member of the Wisconsin State Assembly. It was listed on the National Register of Historic Places in 1982 and on the State Register of Historic Places in 1989.

Other designs by Graves in Rutland, the Sereno W. Graves House, the Daniel Pond Farmhouse and the Lockwood Barn, are also listed on both registers.
