= Rutland United Brethren in Christ Meeting House and Cemetery =

Historic church in Wisconsin, United States

- U.S. National Register of Historic Places
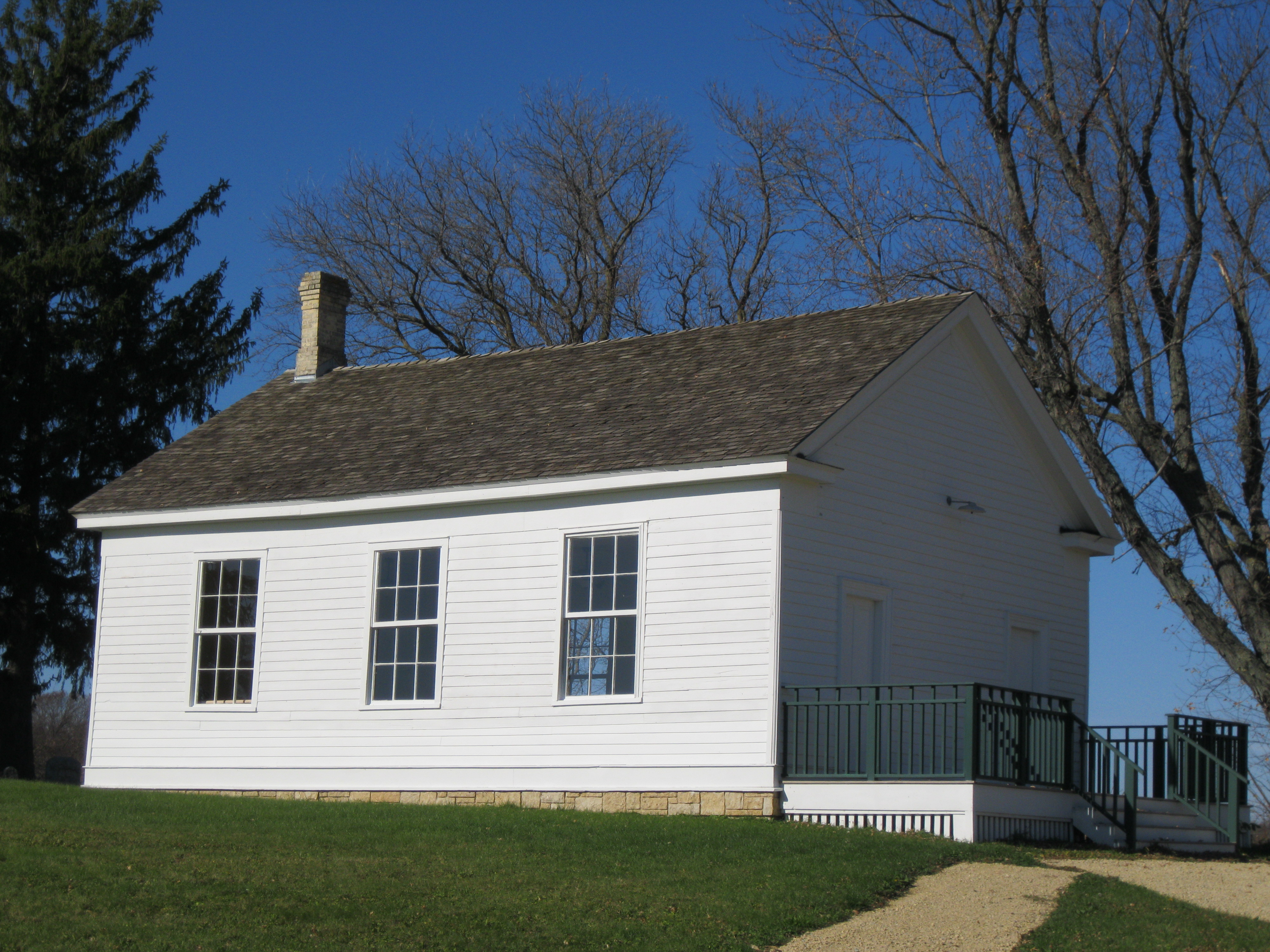

- Location within Wisconsin Location within the United States
- Location: 687 US 14, Rutland, Wisconsin
- Coordinates: 42°52′59″N 89°21′5″W
- Area: 1.5 acres (0.61 ha)
- Built: 1852
- NRHP reference No.: 04001002
- Added to NRHP: September 15, 2004

The Rutland United Brethren in Christ Meeting House and Cemetery is a rather simple frame church built in 1852 in Rutland, Wisconsin. The site was added to the National Register of Historic Places in 2004 for its religious significance.

The Church of the United Brethren in Christ is an evangelical denomination with Mennonite and German Reformed roots, formed in 1800. The first prayer meeting in Wisconsin of United Brethren occurred around 1840 at the home of "father" Johnson near Rutland. In 1840 the first United Brethren class in the state commenced in the home of Joseph Dominic DeJean in Rutland.

In 1851 a congregation was formed, led by Reverend A. Bacher, with 65 members. Charter members included Joseph DeJean, Taylor Valentine, A.G. Newton, Mr. and Mrs. David Anthony, E.D. Sholts, Emma Graves, the Burtons, the Haskins, the Prentices, and Dan Pond.

The congregation bought 1.5 acres for a meeting house and burial ground in a rise above the Janesville and Madison Road – now US-14. The land cost ten dollars. They built the meeting house in 1852 or 1853. The building is a simple rectangle, 26 by 36 feet. Walls are frame. At the top are frieze boards. Above that are returned eaves – simple features drawn from the Greek Revival style that was then popular. A wooden stoop spans the front of the building, now rebuilt several times. Inside, a platform spans the west end of the building. The original pews stand in four rows facing the platform. The walls are finished with plaster and horizontal wainscoting. The meeting house was dedicated in the fall of 1853, – the first United Brethren building in Wisconsin.

The oldest headstones in the cemetery are from the 1850s. Some are decorated with "symbols characteristic of the era, such as clasped hands (for married couples), roses not yet in full bloom (for young women), and a hand pointing toward heaven."

It was in this Rutland meeting house that the Wisconsin Conference of the United Brethren in Christ was organized in 1858. Revival meetings were also held at the meeting house, including one led by George K. Little in the summer of 1883. At the end, Little baptized 38 converts in a nearby lake with 3,000 in attendance.

Church membership dropped. In 1903 some women of the congregation formed a group called the Mite Society, partly to maintain the property, but they couldn't keep up with the cemetery, so the Rutland Center Cemetery Association formed in 1908. In 1912 the Conference quit sending a minister to Rutland. A pastor from Janesville came to preach occasionally, but in 1922 the United Brethren sold the meeting house to the Cemetery Association.

In later years the building was used from time to time for public events and funerals, and Seventh Day Adventist services. In 1974 the Cemetery Association could no longer keep up the cemetery, so deeded it to the town of Rutland. In 2003 the Rutland Church and Cemetery Committee formed to care for the site.
