= Lockwood Barn =

- U.S. National Register of Historic Places
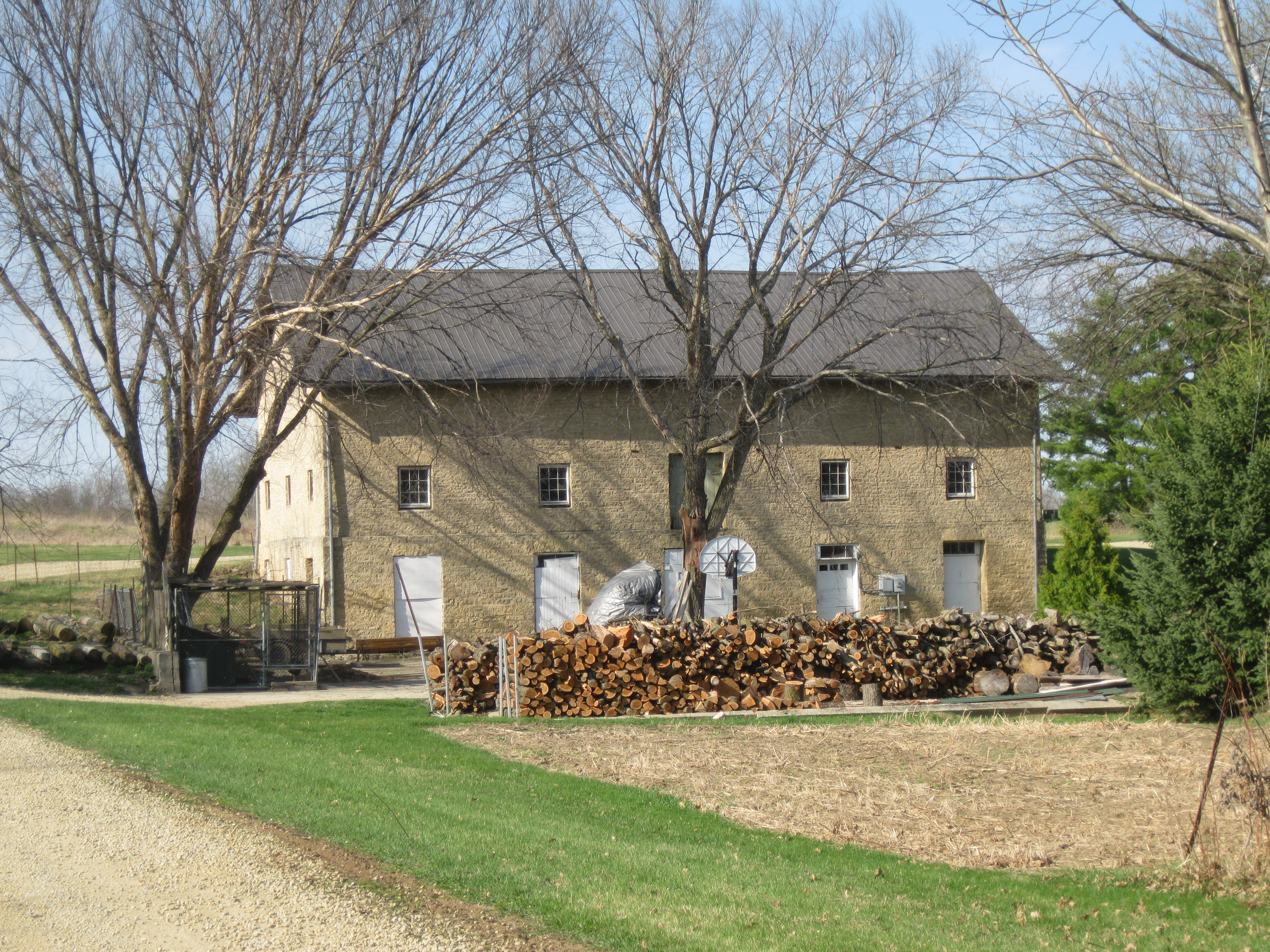
- Lockwood Barn
- Location: Old Stage Rd, Rutland, Wisconsin
- Coordinates: 42°51′54″N 89°19′22″W
- Area: less than one acre
- Built: 1855
- Architect: Sereno W. Graves
- MPS: Graves Stone Buildings TR
- NRHP reference No.: 82000653
- Added to NRHP: September 29, 1982

The Lockwood Barn is located in Rutland, Wisconsin.

== History ==
The barn was designed by Sereno W. Graves, who later became a member of the Wisconsin State Assembly. Graves also designed the Samuel Hunt House and the Daniel Pond Farmhouse, along with designing and residing in the Sereno W. Graves House, which are also located in Rutland. The barn was listed on the National Register of Historic Places in 1982 and on the State Register of Historic Places in 1989.
