= Rutland (community), Wisconsin =

Rutland, Wisconsin
- Unincorporated community
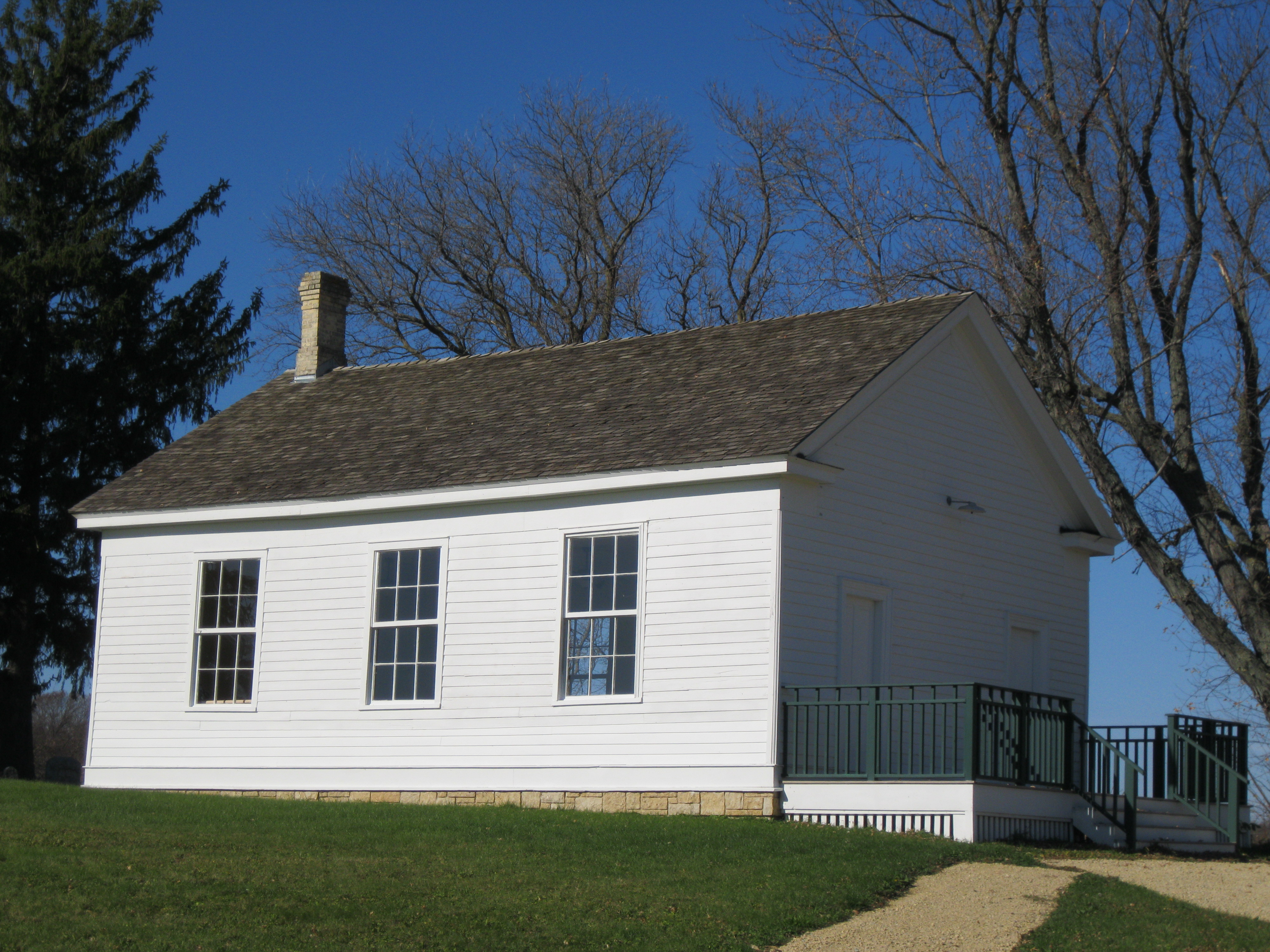
- Rutland United Brethren Church

- Location within Wisconsin Location within the United States
- Coordinates: 42°52′44″N 89°21′00″W
- Country: United States
- State: Wisconsin
- County: Dane County
- Town: Rutland
- Elevation: 945 ft (288 m)
- Time zone: UTC-6 (Central (CST))
  - Summer (DST): UTC-5 (CDT)
- Area code: 608
- GNIS feature ID: 1572761

Rutland is an unincorporated community located in the town of Rutland, Dane County, Wisconsin, United States.
