= Daniel Pond Farmhouse =

Historic house in Wisconsin, United States

- U.S. National Register of Historic Places
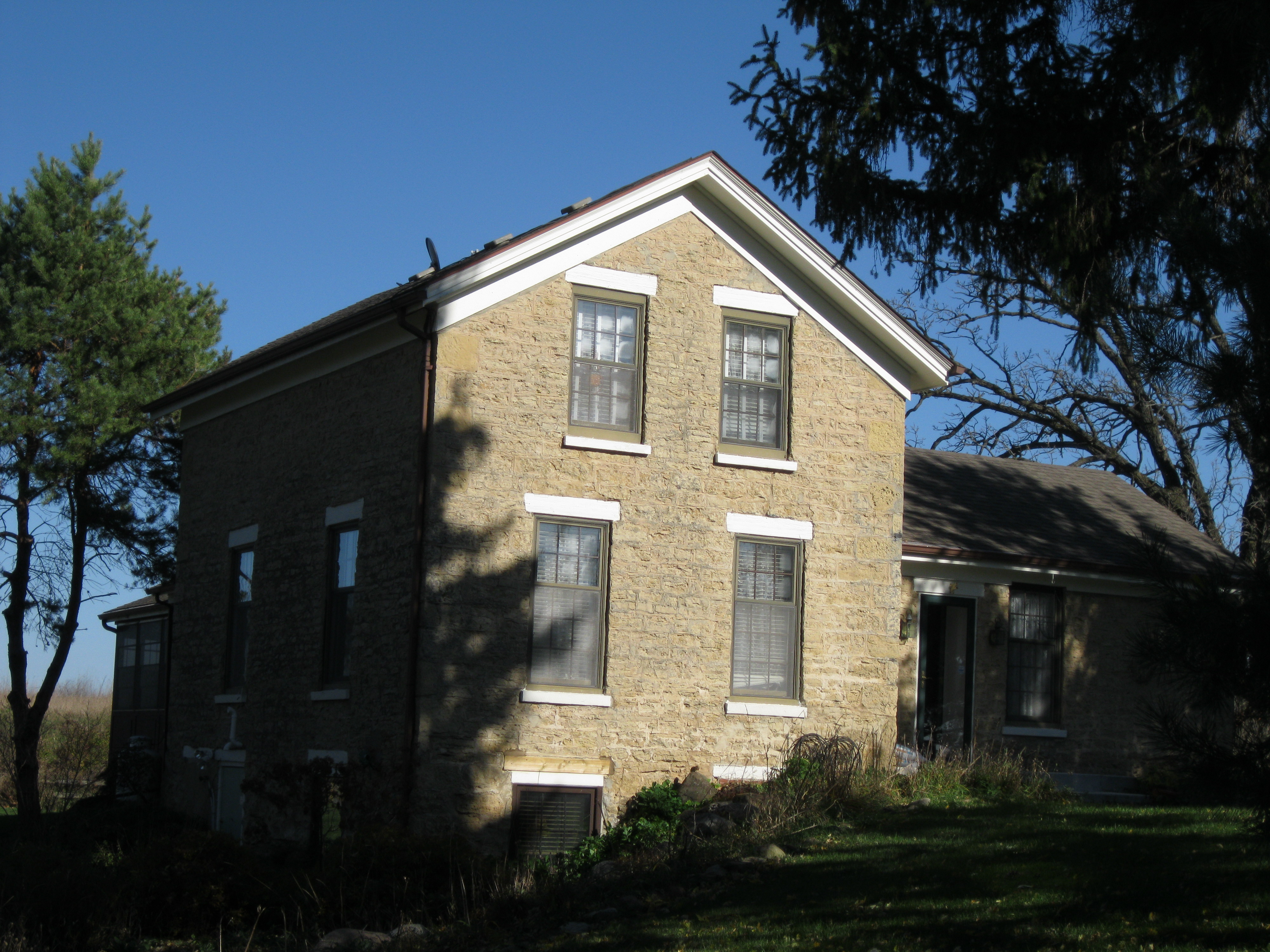
- Daniel Pond Farmhouse
- Location: 76 US Hwy 14; Rutland, Wisconsin
- Coordinates: 42°50′58″N 89°20′02″W
- Area: less than one acre
- Built: 1850
- Architect: Sereno W. Graves
- NRHP reference No.: 80000128
- Added to NRHP: June 30, 1980

The Daniel Pond Farmhouse, also known as Eggleston Farm, is a limestone-walled home built in Rutland, Wisconsin in the 1840s. In 1980 the house was listed on the National Register of Historic Places.

== History ==
The first permanent settlers in what would become the town of Rutland arrived in the summer of 1842, and staked claims near the Janesville and Madison Road - now US-14. They were the Dejeans, the Prentises, and Daniel Pond. This area lacked large natural water sources, so land speculators bypassed it, and the land was affordable to farmers without a lot of capital. Daniel was from Vermont and enough neighbors who followed were from the same state that the neighborhood came to be called the Vermont settlement. The farmers in the area quickly found wheat to be a practical, profitable cash crop.

Pond probably had the 1.5-story section of the house built some time between 1844 and 1850 - probably designed by Sereno W. Graves, who farmed only a mile away and later became a member of the Wisconsin State Assembly. The walls are coursed small pieces of limestone, with the corner quoins larger blocks of dressed stone. A frieze board at the top of the walls leads to a moderately-pitched roof. The windows have wooden sills and lintels. Two one-story wings of similar stonework extend from the main block.

The house was home to Pond, his wife, and two children. Also on the farm lived his widowed mother-in-law, Temperance Munger with her son and daughter, and a single man, Stewart Shampmore.

By 1850 the Pond farm was prospering, worth about $2,000. That year the Ponds harvested 400 bushels of wheat, 150 bushels of corn, 500 bushels of oats, 150 bushels of potatoes, and 10 bushels of barley. Their sixty sheep produced 300 pounds of wool, and their five cows produced 100 pounds of cheese and 600 pounds of butter.

In 1854, James P. Kniffin and his family bought the farm. They continued to farm, adding 60 swine to the herd. In 1870 James retired, deeding the land to his son Lloyd. In 1874 John and Thomas Alsop bought the farm, and in 1893 the Petersons bought it.

Charles Peterson was born in Maribo, Denmark in 1861 and immigrated to America and Rutland with his family in 1869. He worked as farm labor, saving money, and in 1883 married Katie Hansen, another immigrant from Denmark. In 1889 they were able to buy 80 acres. Four years later he sold that farm to buy the 193-acre Pond farm. By 1906 the Petersons had added 160 acres to the farm. They grew nine acres of tobacco, 100 acres of corn, 50 acres of oats, and 25 of hay. Over the years the Petersons had ten children. Charles died in 1915 and Katie in 1930, but Petersons stayed on the farm until 1944.

The house was listed on the National Register of Historic Places in 1980 and on the State Register of Historic Places in 1989. It is significant as part of an unusual cluster of stone buildings, including the Sereno W. Graves House, the Samuel Hunt House and the Lockwood Barn. The farm also exemplifies a typical pattern for the area, with its early settlement by Yankees who grew wheat, followed by Scandinavian immigrants in the late 1800s.
