= Sereno W. Graves House =

Historic house in Wisconsin, United States

- U.S. National Register of Historic Places
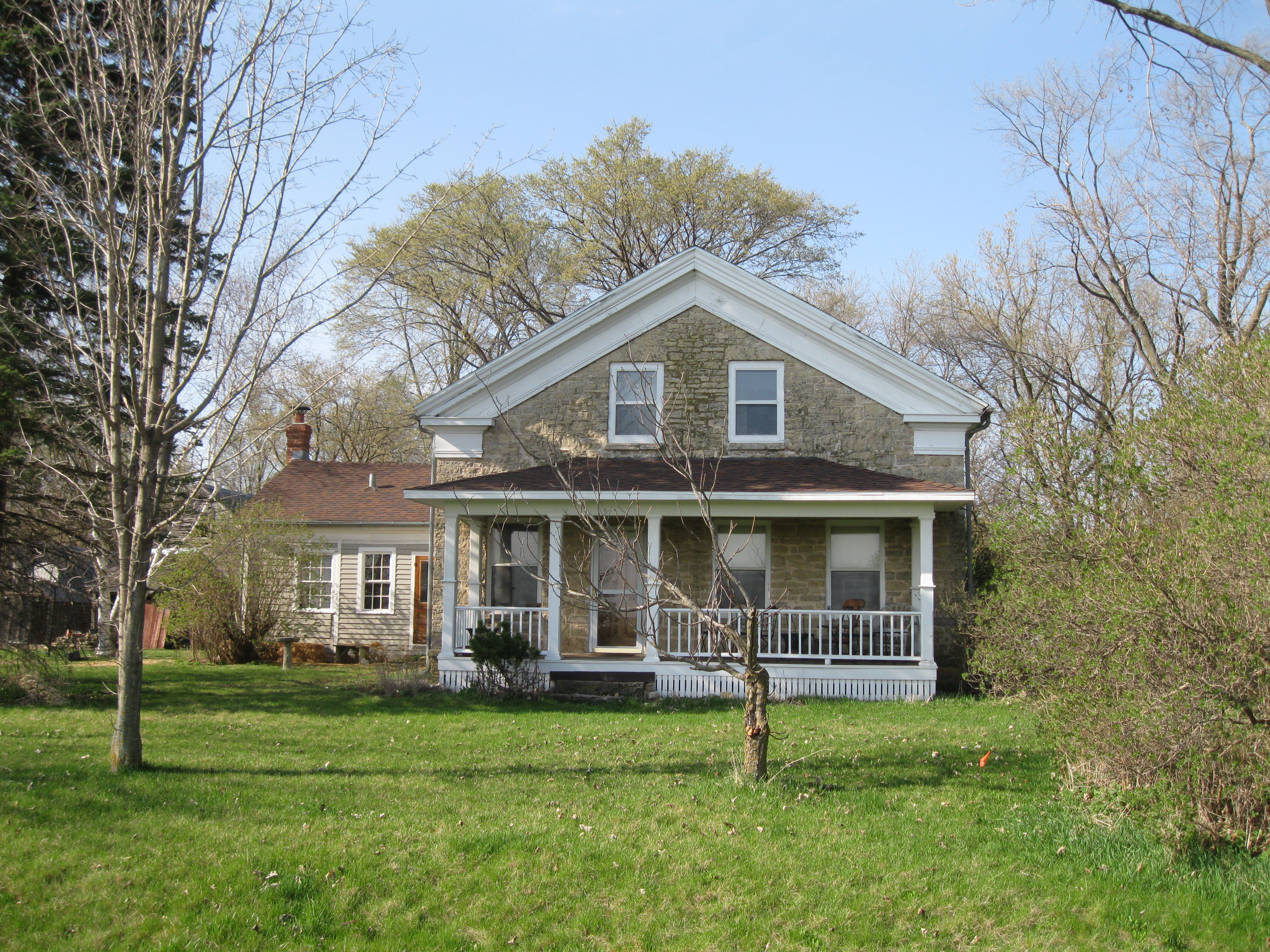
- Sereno W. Graves House
- Location: 4006 Old Stage Rd., Rutland, Wisconsin
- Coordinates: 42°51′49″N 89°18′50″W
- Area: less than one acre
- Built: 1845
- Architect: Sereno W. Graves
- Architectural style: Greek Revival
- MPS: Graves Stone Buildings TR
- NRHP reference No.: 82000651
- Added to NRHP: September 29, 1982

The Sereno W. Graves House is located in Rutland, Wisconsin.

== History ==
Sereno W. Graves would become a member of the Wisconsin State Assembly. The house was listed on the National Register of Historic Places in 1982 and on the State Register of Historic Places in 1989.

Graves also designed the Samuel Hunt House and the Lockwood Barn in Rutland, which are also listed on both registers.
