= Stone, Wisconsin =

- Unincorporated community
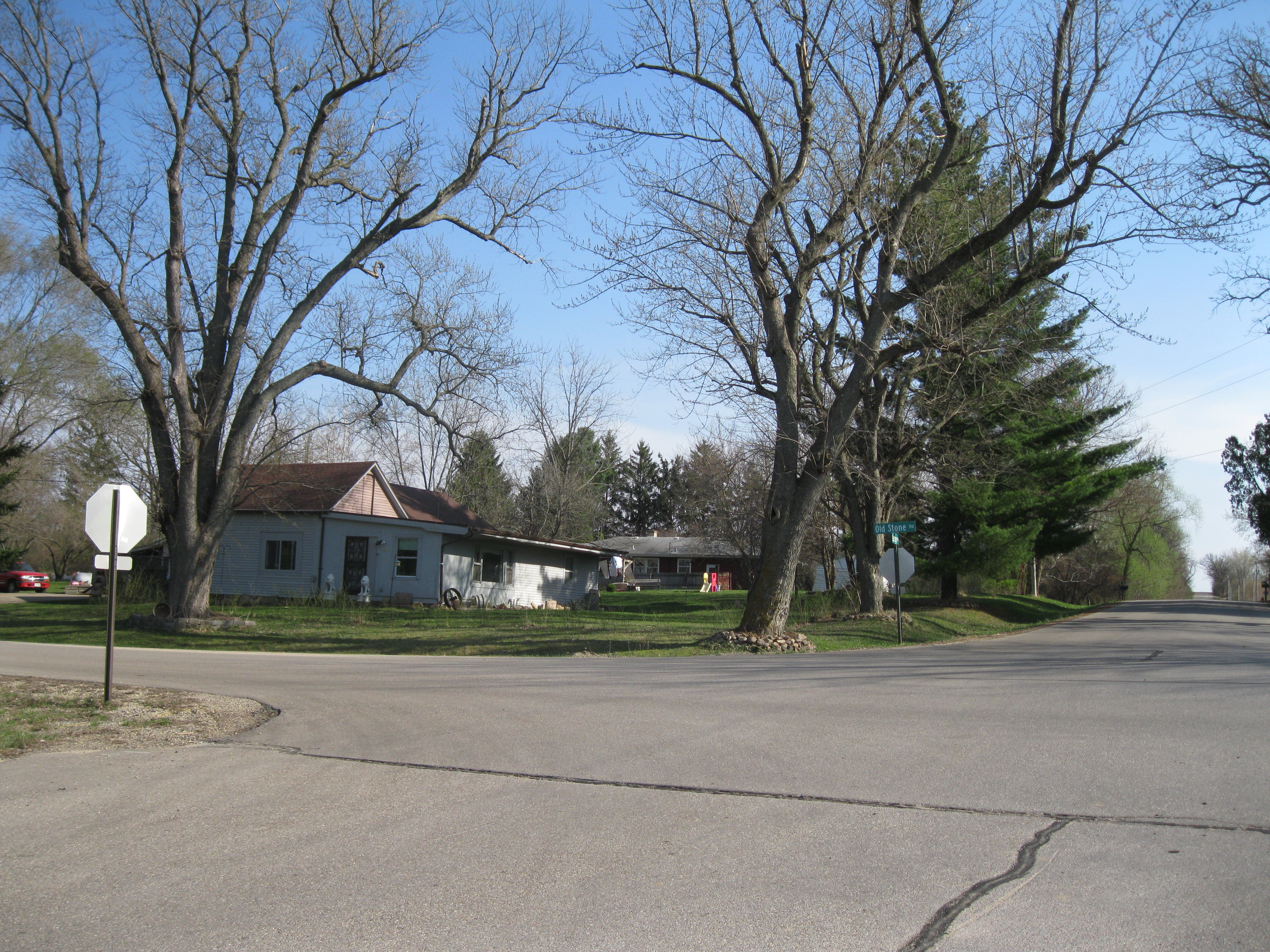
- Looking south at the intersection of Old Stone Road and Center Road

- Location within Wisconsin Location within the United States
- Coordinates: 42°52′29″N 89°18′36″W
- Country: United States
- State: Wisconsin
- County: Dane County
- Town: Rutland
- Elevation: 915 ft (279 m)
- Time zone: UTC-6 (Central (CST))
  - Summer (DST): UTC-5 (CDT)
- Area code: 608
- GNIS feature ID: 1577840

Stone is an unincorporated community located in the town of Rutland, Dane County, Wisconsin, United States.
