= Sereno W. Graves =

American politician

Sereno W. Graves (October 11, 1810 – February 13, 1899) was a member of the Wisconsin State Assembly.

Graves was born in Berkshire, Vermont. He was a colonel in the Vermont state militia in 1836. He married Malindy Blakerly in 1841; she died the same year. He married Melvina Dennison in 1843. He moved to Rutland, Wisconsin, in 1844. He and his second wife had a son before her death in 1845. In 1846, Graves married Mary R. Dudley. They had five children. He was a Baptist. He died in Evansville, Wisconsin in 1899.

His former home, now known as the Sereno W. Graves House, is listed on the National Register of Historic Places. The Samuel Hunt House, the Daniel Pond Farmhouse and the Lockwood Barn, all of which Graves also designed, are also listed.

== Career ==
Graves was a member of the Assembly in 1861 and a candidate for the Wisconsin State Senate in 1875. In addition, he was Clerk and Assessor of Rutland, Surveyor of Dane County, Wisconsin and a justice of the peace. He was a Republican.
