= Allison Legacy Series =

Stock car racing series

- Category: Stock car racing
- Country: United States
- Inaugural season: 1996
- Tire suppliers: Goodyear Tire and Rubber Company
- Official website: http://www.allisonlegacy.com/

The Allison Legacy Series is a stock car racing series in the United States. It is based on 3/4 size scaled-down NASCAR Cup Series chassis utilizing a Mazda B-2200 truck engine. The lower-tier series has been used as a stepping stone into higher divisions. The cars were designed in 1996 by NASCAR driver Donnie Allison's sons, Donald, Kenny, and Ronald Allison.

== History ==
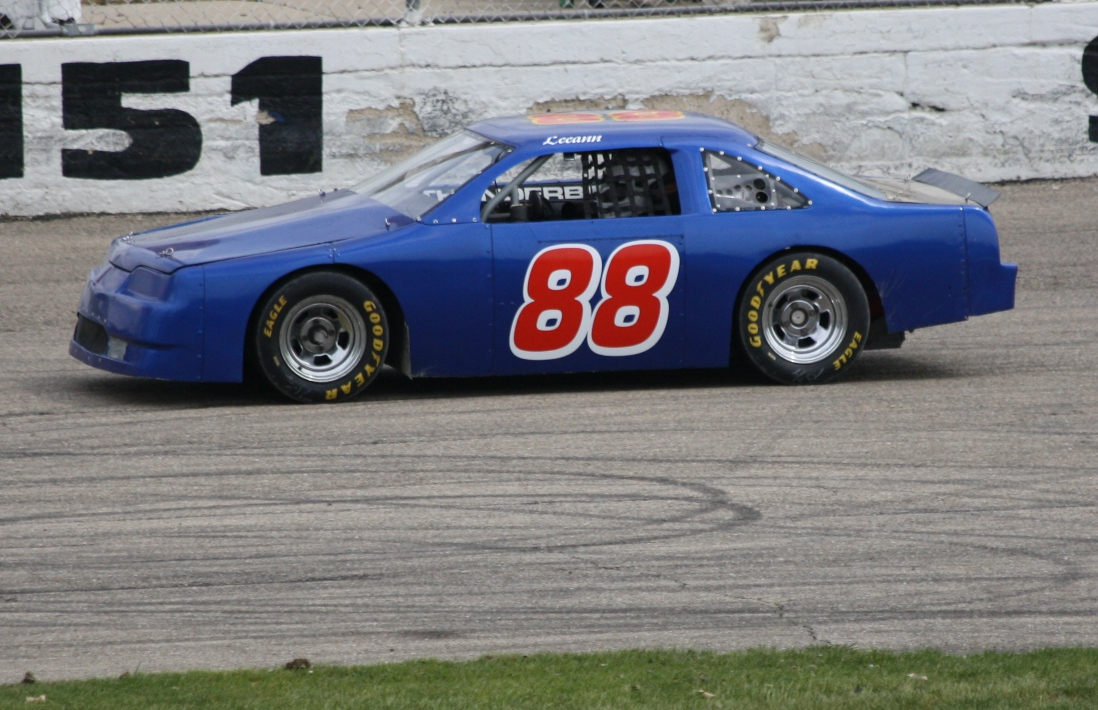
An Allison Legacy Series car at Columbus 151 Speedway in 2012

The series was conceived in 1996 by Donald, Kenny, and Ronald Allison, the sons of former NASCAR driver Donnie Allison. The vehicles were designed to be 3/4 size stock cars. Kenny Allison said that the cars were designed to be of "decent cost" and have "decent maintenance costs" yet be a class that fans can "relate to". The cars began to compete regularly in 1998 with the formation of a national series. The national touring series is run out of the Allison Brothers shop at Salisbury, North Carolina. By 2004, eight regional touring series had formed in the United States, including the Maine Legacy Series which had Canadian dates in Quebec and Nova Scotia.

The cars are typically raced on road courses and 0.5 miles (0.80 km) or less short tracks. Feature events are typically 50 laps or less.

== Vehicle ==
The series uses a tubular chassis with a fiberglass body. Body styles include a Ford Thunderbird and Chevrolet Monte Carlo. The vehicle is near 60 inches (150 cm) wide, 12.5 feet (3.8 m) long, 42 inches (110 cm) high, with an 80 inches (200 cm) wheelbase. The chassis is coupled with a Mazda B2200 2.2-liter engine. The chassis must weigh 1,425 pounds (646 kg) (without the driver), and it uses 7-inch-wide (18 cm) Goodyear tires. As of August 2004, the vehicles were estimated to cost around $16,800 by the Stock Car Racing Magazine.

Racing enhancements including an aluminum radiator, adjustable front suspension, aluminum front hubs, a quick-change rear end, steel racing wheels, and coil over shocks and springs. An aluminum racing seat, 5-point harness, and window nets are required for safety.

== Drivers ==
Drivers in the series are part-time, including children who are old enough to have jobs. The series is often used as a development series by Late Model drivers. Drivers who have used the Allison Legacy Series on their way to NASCAR include Trevor Bayne, Kelly Bires, Erik Darnell, Joey Logano, David Ragan, Regan Smith, John Hunter Nemechek, and Brian Vickers. Chad McCumbee won the 2001 national championship and rookie of the year; he repeated as champion in the following season. Timmy Hill won the 2009 U.S. national championship after winning ten races.

=== National championship drivers ===
- 1996 Doug Stevens
- 1997 Blake Bainbridge
- 1998 Randy Brantley
- 1999 Regan Smith
- 2000 Jay Godley
- 2001 Chad McCumbee
- 2002 Chad McCumbee
- 2003 Mark Howard
- 2004 Derek Lee
- 2005 Trevor Bayne
- 2006 Nicholas Pope
- 2007 Michael Cooper
- 2008 Austin Hogue
- 2009 Timmy Hill
- 2010 Justin Allison
- 2011 Tyler Hill
- 2012 John Hunter Nemechek
- 2013 Justin LaDuke
- 2014 Devin O'Connell
- 2015 Jantzen Stirewalt
- 2016 Justin Taylor
- 2017 Kyle Campbell
- 2018 Brett Suggs
- 2019 Luke Akers
- 2020 Ethan Elder
- 2021 Jacob O’Neal
- 2022 David Smith
- 2023 Justin Oplinger
- 2024 Ethan Elder
- 2025 Ethan Elder
