= 2014 ARCA Racing Series =

62nd season of the ARCA Racing Series

Seasons
- ← 2013 2015 →

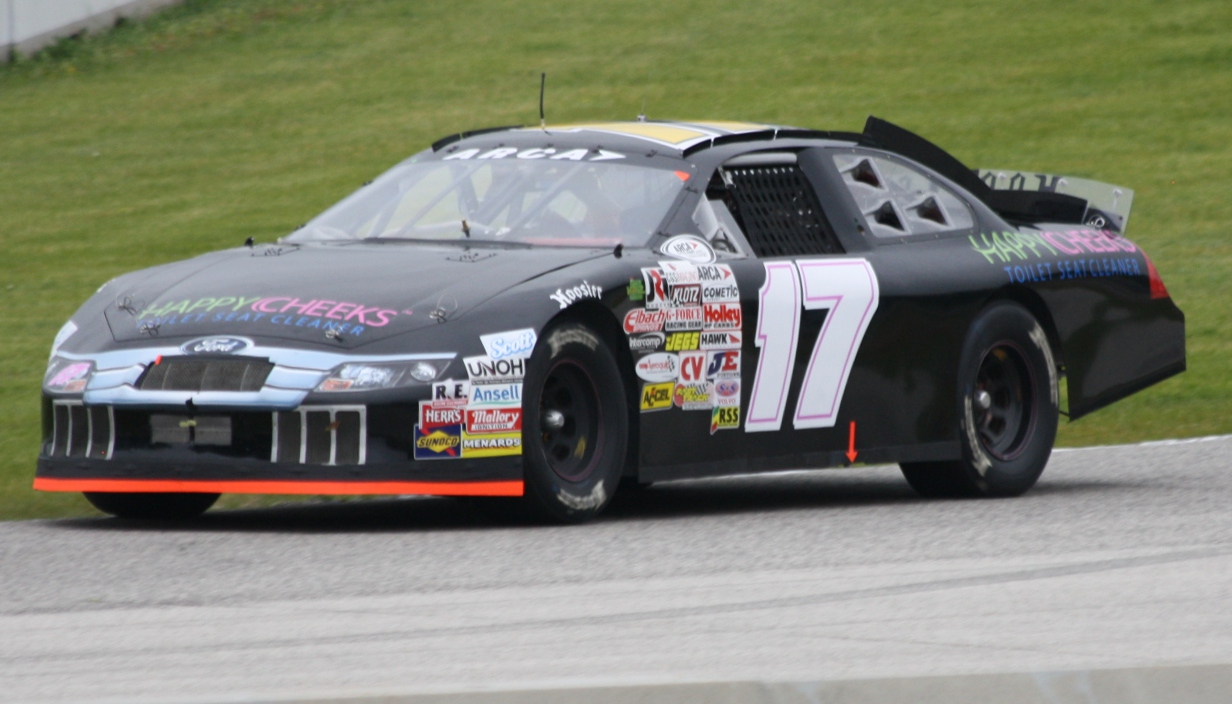
Mason Mitchell, the 2014 ARCA champion.

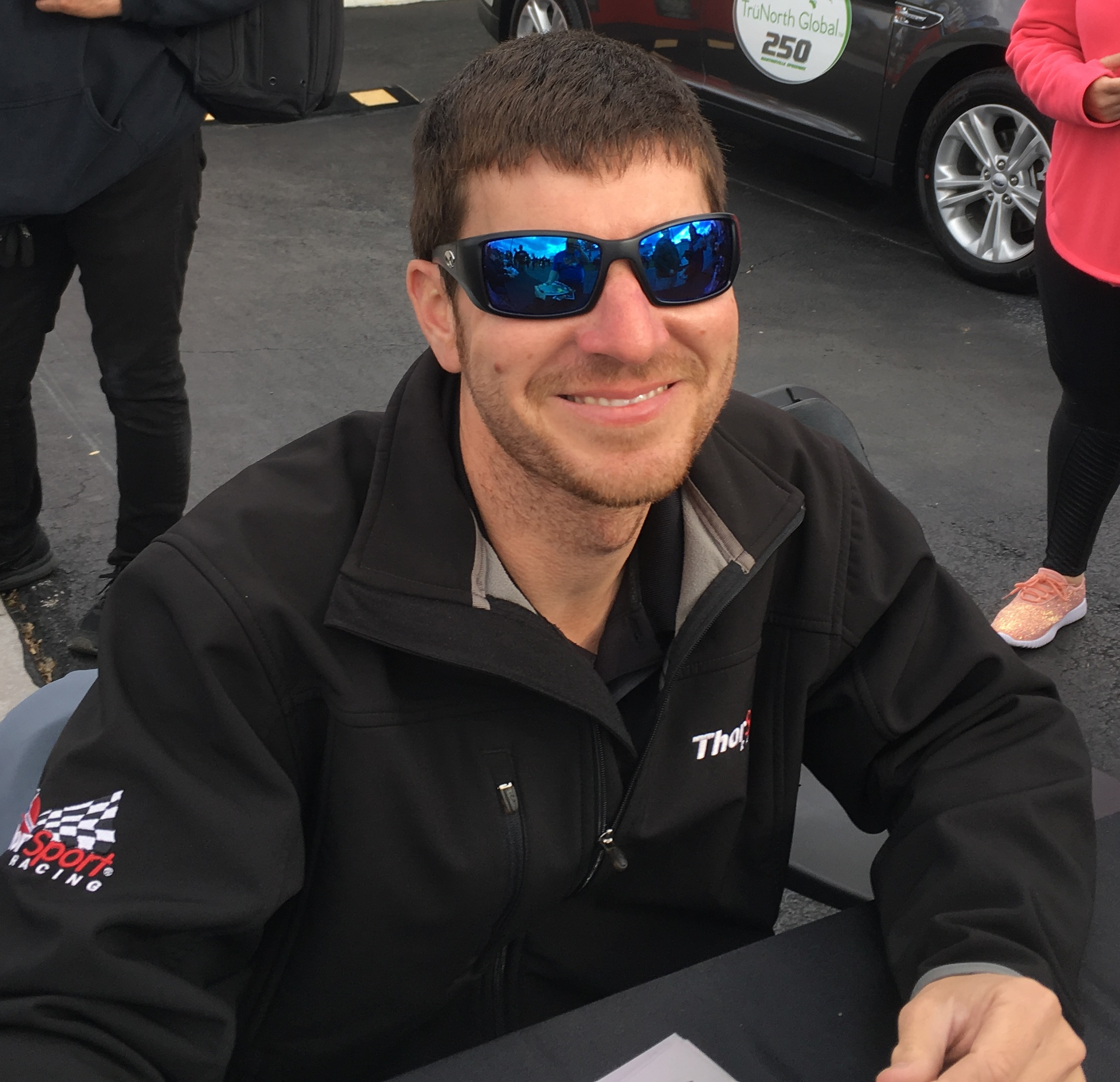
Grant Enfinger finished second behind Mitchell in the championship.

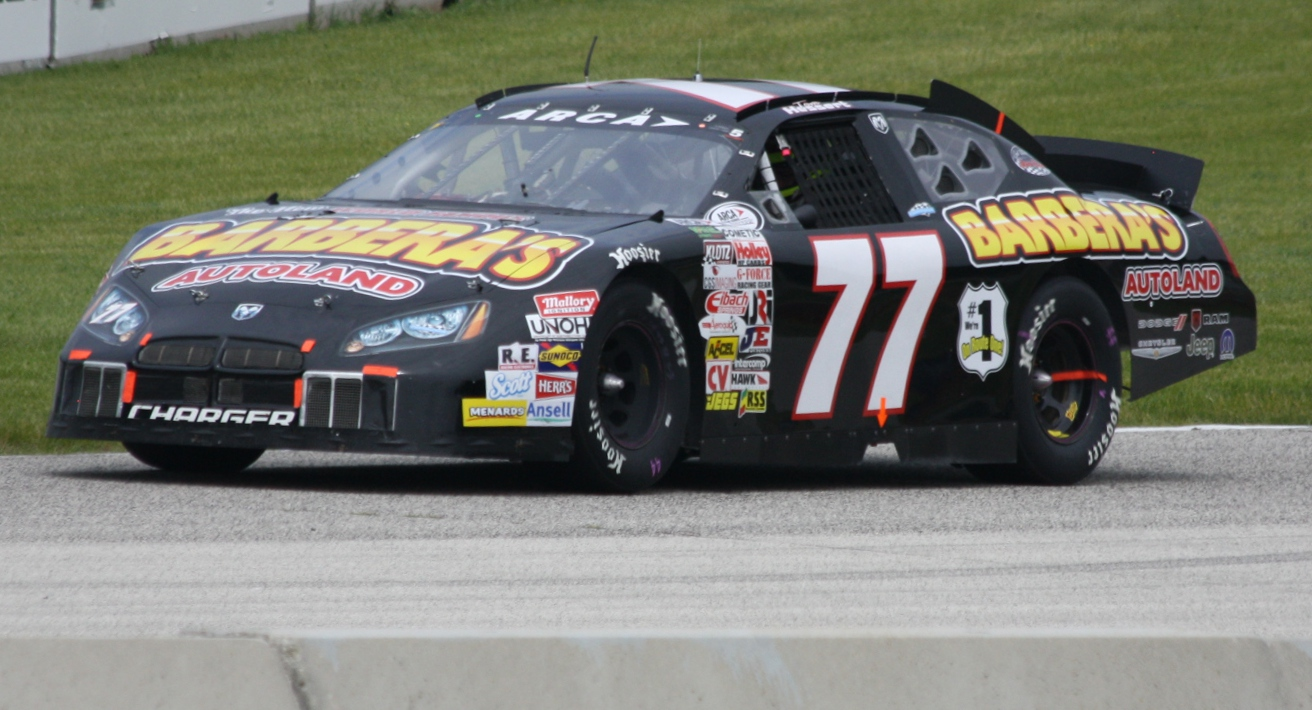
Tom Hessert III, driving the No. 77 car for Cunningham Motorsports, finished third in the championship.

The 2014 ARCA Racing Series presented by Menards was the 62nd season of the ARCA Racing Series. The season began on February 15 with the Lucas Oil 200 presented by MAVTV American Real and ended on October 3 with the ARCA 98.9, after a total of 20 races.

Mason Mitchell won his first series title, through consistent finishing. Despite winning only one race all season – July's Ansell ActivArmr 150 – Mitchell finished all but two races inside the top ten placings.

== Teams and drivers ==
=== Complete schedule ===
Manufacturer	Team	No.	Driver
Chevrolet	Ken Schrader Racing	52	Clay Campbell 2
Chevrolet	Ken Schrader Racing	52	Matt Tifft 8
Chevrolet	Ken Schrader Racing	52	Ken Schrader 10
Chevrolet	RACE 101 with Hixson Motorsports	3	Tom Buzze 1
Chevrolet	RACE 101 with Hixson Motorsports	3	Karl Weber (R) 14
Chevrolet	RACE 101 with Hixson Motorsports	3	Kevin Powell 1
Chevrolet	RACE 101 with Hixson Motorsports	3	Ron Cox 2
Chevrolet	RACE 101 with Hixson Motorsports	3	Jerry Tunney 1
Chevrolet	RACE 101 with Hixson Motorsports	3	Ross Kenseth 1
Dodge	Carter 2 Motorsports	40	Alx Danielsson 1
Dodge	Carter 2 Motorsports	40	Dustin Knowles 1
Dodge	Carter 2 Motorsports	40	Chris Bailey Jr. 1
Dodge	Carter 2 Motorsports	40	Donnie Neuenberger 1
Dodge	Carter 2 Motorsports	40	Jay Curry 3
Dodge	Carter 2 Motorsports	40	David Sear 1
Dodge	Carter 2 Motorsports	40	Jon Haney 1
Dodge	Carter 2 Motorsports	40	Jami Weimer 1
Dodge	Carter 2 Motorsports	40	Galen Hassler 1
Dodge	Carter 2 Motorsports	40	Mike Senica 1
Dodge	Carter 2 Motorsports	40	Evan Pardo 1
Dodge	Carter 2 Motorsports	40	Ray Ciccarelli 2
Dodge	Carter 2 Motorsports	40	Roger Carter 3
Dodge	Carter 2 Motorsports	40	Josh Reeves 1
Dodge	Carter 2 Motorsports	40	Mark Meunier 1
Dodge	Carter 2 Motorsports	97	Tim Viens 6
Dodge	Carter 2 Motorsports	97	Wayne Peterson 1
Dodge	Carter 2 Motorsports	97	Tommy O'Leary IV 1
Dodge	Carter 2 Motorsports	97	Roger Carter 5
Dodge	Carter 2 Motorsports	97	Ray Ciccarelli 1
Dodge	Carter 2 Motorsports	97	Emerson Newton-John 1
Dodge	Carter 2 Motorsports	97	Katlynn Leer 2
Dodge	Carter 2 Motorsports	97	Mark Meunier 1
Dodge	Cunningham Motorsports	22	Tyler Reddick 1
Dodge	Cunningham Motorsports	22	Austin Wayne Self (R) 19
Dodge	Cunningham Motorsports	77	Tom Hessert III 17
Dodge	Cunningham Motorsports	77	Anderson Bowen 3
Ford	Empire Racing 1 James Hylton Motorsports 19	48	Sean Corr 1
Ford	Empire Racing 1 James Hylton Motorsports 19	48	Darrell Basham 2
Ford	Empire Racing 1 James Hylton Motorsports 19	48	Rick Clifton 3
Ford	Empire Racing 1 James Hylton Motorsports 19	48	Brad Smith 14
Ford	Kimmel Racing	68	Chris Bailey Jr. 9
Ford	Kimmel Racing	68	Michael Lira (R) 7
Ford	Kimmel Racing	68	Will Kimmel 4
Ford	Kimmel Racing	69	Will Kimmel 8
Ford	Kimmel Racing	69	Mark Meunier 2
Ford	Kimmel Racing	69	Chris Bailey Jr. 3
Ford	Kimmel Racing	69	Raúl Orlandini Jr. 1
Ford	Kimmel Racing	69	Michael Lira (R) 4
Ford	Kimmel Racing	69	Kenny Matthews 1
Ford	Mason Mitchell Motorsports	98	Mason Mitchell
Toyota	Venturini Motorsports	15	John Wes Townley 15
Toyota	Venturini Motorsports	15	B. J. McLeod 1
Toyota	Venturini Motorsports	15	Brennan Poole 3
Toyota	Venturini Motorsports	15	Kevin Swindell 1
Toyota	Venturini Motorsports	25	Justin Boston
Toyota	Venturini Motorsports	55	Leilani Munter 2
Toyota	Venturini Motorsports	55	Cody Coughlin (R) 11
Toyota	Venturini Motorsports	55	Brian Wong 1
Toyota	Venturini Motorsports	55	Justin Haley 3
Toyota	Venturini Motorsports	55	Brennan Poole 2
Toyota	Venturini Motorsports	55	Ben Rhodes 1
Toyota	Win-Tron Racing	44	Frank Kimmel
Chevrolet Ford Dodge	Fast Track Racing 1 Wayne Peterson Racing 19	06	Ed Pompa 1
Chevrolet Ford Dodge	Fast Track Racing 1 Wayne Peterson Racing 19	06	Joey Gattina 2
Chevrolet Ford Dodge	Fast Track Racing 1 Wayne Peterson Racing 19	06	James Swanson 6
Chevrolet Ford Dodge	Fast Track Racing 1 Wayne Peterson Racing 19	06	Tim Viens 3
Chevrolet Ford Dodge	Fast Track Racing 1 Wayne Peterson Racing 19	06	Steve Fox 1
Chevrolet Ford Dodge	Fast Track Racing 1 Wayne Peterson Racing 19	06	Wayne Peterson 4
Chevrolet Ford Dodge	Fast Track Racing 1 Wayne Peterson Racing 19	06	Don Thompson 1
Chevrolet Ford Dodge	Fast Track Racing 1 Wayne Peterson Racing 19	06	Barry Fitzgerald 1
Chevrolet Ford Dodge	Fast Track Racing 1 Wayne Peterson Racing 19	06	Dale Matchett 1
Chevrolet 5 Ford 15	Hixson Motorsports	2	Thomas Praytor
Ford 11 Chevrolet 9	Team BCR Racing 11; GMS Racing 9	90	Grant Enfinger
Ford Dodge	Promotion Associates 2 Wayne Peterson Racing 18	0	Berry Fitzgerald 2
Ford Dodge	Promotion Associates 2 Wayne Peterson Racing 18	0	James Swanson 11
Ford Dodge	Promotion Associates 2 Wayne Peterson Racing 18	0	Wayne Peterson 1
Ford Dodge	Promotion Associates 2 Wayne Peterson Racing 18	0	Don Thompson 1
Ford Dodge	Promotion Associates 2 Wayne Peterson Racing 18	0	Con Nicolopoulos 3
Ford Dodge	Promotion Associates 2 Wayne Peterson Racing 18	0	Joe Walsh 1
Ford Dodge	Promotion Associates 2 Wayne Peterson Racing 18	0	Tim Viens 1

=== Limited schedule ===
Manufacturer	Team	No.	Driver	Rounds
Chevrolet	Allgaier Motorsports	16	Kelly Kovski	2
Chevrolet	Bill Elliott Racing	9	Chase Elliott	1
Chevrolet	Bill Martel Racing	43	Kyle Martel	2
Chevrolet	Blake Hillard Racing (Note: It was a Blake Hillard Racing entry using Fast Track Racing's owner points.)	10	Blake Hillard	2
Chevrolet	Blake Hillard Racing	11	Blake Hillard	1
Chevrolet	Bob Schacht Motorsports	75	Benny Chastain	1
Chevrolet	Bobby Gerhart Racing	7	Scotty Hubler	2
Chevrolet	Brother-In-Law Racing	57	Bryan Dauzat	1
Chevrolet	Catania Racing	18	Bill Catania	12
Chevrolet	Darrell Basham Racing	34	Darrell Basham	5
Chevrolet	DGM Racing	17	Alex Guenette	1
Chevrolet	Ebert Motorsports	19	David Sear	1
Chevrolet	Finney Racing Enterprises	8	Barry Layne	1
Chevrolet	Finney Racing Enterprises	80	Barry Layne	1
Chevrolet	Finney Racing Enterprises	80	Brian Finney	4
Chevrolet	GMS Racing	20	Scott Sheldon	2
Chevrolet	GMS Racing	20	Spencer Gallagher (Note: After Gallagher failed to qualify for the race at Daytona in his own No. 23 car, he replaced Scott Sheldon in the No. 20.)	1
Chevrolet	GMS Racing	23	Spencer Gallagher	11
Chevrolet	HARE Motorsports	60	Galen Hassler	1
Chevrolet	Hendren Motorsports	24	Ryan Unzicker	2
Chevrolet	Hendren Motorsports	66	Bob Strait	2 (Note: It was a Hendren Motorsports entry using Venturini Motorsports' owner points.)
Chevrolet	Ken Schrader Racing (Note: It was a Ken Schrader Racing entry using Fast Track Racing's owner points.)	10	Matt Tifft	1
Chevrolet	Ken Schrader Racing	11	Matt Tifft	1
Chevrolet	Lafferty Motorsports	89	Tanner Tallarico	1
Chevrolet	Littleton Motorsports	5	Mark Littleton	2
Chevrolet	Matthews Motorsports	6	Darin Matthews	1
Chevrolet	Mike Affarano Motorsports	03	Mike Affarano	1
Chevrolet	Mike Buckley Racing	28	Mike Buckley	3
Chevrolet	RACE 101 with Hixson Motorsports	50	Karl Weber (R)	3
Chevrolet	Ryan Heavner Racing (Note: It was a Ryan Heavner Racing entry using Fast Track Racing's owner points.)	11	Ryan Heavner	1
Chevrolet	TAS Racing	10	Tyler Speer	1
Chevrolet	Team LaCross Motorsports	03	Brent Cross	1
Chevrolet	Team LaCross Motorsports	7	Brent Cross	3
Chevrolet	Tom Berte Racing	66	Tom Berte	1 (Note: It was a Tom Berte Racing entry using Venturini Motorsports' owner points.)
Chevrolet	Tom Berte Racing	20	Tom Berte	4
Chevrolet	Tony Marks Racing	12	Jared Marks	1
Chevrolet	Tony Marks Racing	33	Kody Weisner	1
Chevrolet	Turner Scott Motorsports	4	Dylan Kwasniewski	1
Chevrolet	Turner Scott Motorsports	4	Mark Thompson	1
Chevrolet	Turner Scott Motorsports	4	Kyle Larson	1
Chevrolet	Turner Scott Motorsports	4	Brandon Jones	3
Chevrolet	Turner Scott Motorsports	41	Ben Rhodes	1
Chevrolet	Tyler Audie Racing	12	Tyler Audie	2
Chevrolet	Universe Racing	86	Bobby Grewohl	2
Chevrolet	Universe Racing	86	Nick Igdalsky	2
Chevrolet	Wayne Peterson Racing	00	Brad Smith	1
Chevrolet	Wayne Peterson Racing	00	Tom Woodin	1
Chevrolet	Wayne Peterson Racing	00	Tim Viens	1
Chevrolet	Wayne Peterson Racing	00	Wayne Peterson	5
Chevrolet	Wayne Peterson Racing	00	Billy Alger	1
Chevrolet	Wayne Peterson Racing	00	Con Nicolopoulos	1
Chevrolet	Williams-Gosselin Racing	02	Mario Gosselin	1
Dodge	Brian Rose Motorsports	19	Brian Rose	1
Dodge	Crosley Sports Group; Danny Glad Racing	42	Bo LeMastus	2
Dodge	Crosley Sports Group; Danny Glad Racing	56	Derrick Lancaster	2
Dodge	Crosley Sports Group; Danny Glad Racing	56	Devin Steele	1
Dodge	Cunningham Motorsports	72	Tom Hessert III	3
Dodge	Cunningham Motorsports	72	Shannon McIntosh	1
Dodge	Cunningham Motorsports	72	Anderson Bowen	1
Dodge	Cunningham Motorsports	72	Brandon Gdovic	2
Dodge	J. C. Dubil Racing	89	Brad Dubil	1
Dodge	Joseph Hughs Racing	64	Joseph Hughs	1
Dodge	Kurzejewski Motorsports Inc.	54	Matt Kurzejewski	1
Dodge	Kurzejewski Motorsports Inc.	66	Matt Kurzejewski	1 (Note: It was a Kurzejewski Motorsports Inc. entry using Venturini Motorsports's owner points.)
Dodge	NDS Motorsports	53	Andrew Ranger	1
Dodge	Team BEAR	29	Wayne Edwards	2
Dodge	Team BEAR	92	Chris Brown	1
Dodge	Weatherman Motorsports	1	Clayton Weatherman	1
Ford	Benjamin Motorsports	37	Kyle Benjamin	2
Ford	Brad Hill Racing	71	Shane Cockrum	2
Ford	Dale Shearer Racing	73	Dale Shearer	5
Ford	Empire Racing	8	Cole Powell	1
Ford	James Hylton Motorsports	49	Wayne Peterson	1
Ford	James Hylton Motorsports	49	Brian Norton	1
Ford	James Hylton Motorsports	49	Brad Stiffler	1
Ford	Justin Allison Racing	08	Justin Allison	1
Ford	Mystic Motorsports	07	Brian Kaltreider	1
Ford	RFMS Racing	27	A. J. Fike	5
Ford	Roulo Brothers Racing	6	Mark Lambert	1
Ford	Roulo Brothers Racing	17	Bryan Silas	1
Ford	Roulo Brothers Racing	17	Kyle Benjamin	5
Ford	Roulo Brothers Racing	17	Kyle Weatherman	1
Ford	Roulo Brothers Racing	60	Kyle Weatherman	6
Ford	Roulo Brothers Racing	99	Buster Graham	2
Ford	Roulo Brothers Racing	99	Dave Savicki	2
Ford	Roulo Brothers Racing	99	Kyle Weatherman	1
Ford	Roulo Brothers Racing	99	Steve Fox	1
Ford	Roulo Brothers Racing	99	Tom Woodin	1
Ford	Steve Minghenelli Racing	24	Steve Minghenelli	1
Ford	Team BCR Racing	09	John Lowinski-Loh	1
Ford	Team BCR Racing	88	Justin Allison	9
Ford	Team BCR Racing	88	Charles Evans Jr.	1
Ford	Team Stange Racing	47	Buster Graham	1
Ford	Team Stange Racing	47	Christian Celaya	1
Ford	Wes Gonder Racing	11	Benny Gordon	1
Ford	Wes Gonder Racing	11	Garrett Smithley	1
Toyota	ThorSport Racing	13	Jeb Burton	1
Toyota	Venturini Motorsports	66	Mark Thompson	1
Toyota	Venturini Motorsports	66	Michael Self	2
Toyota	Venturini Motorsports	66	Frankie Kimmel	1
Toyota	Venturini Motorsports	66	Justin Haley	3
Toyota	Venturini Motorsports	66	Austin Theriault	1
Toyota	Venturini Motorsports	66	Nick Barstad	1
Toyota	Venturini Motorsports	66	Leilani Munter	2
Toyota	Venturini Motorsports	66	Brennan Poole	2
Toyota	Venturini Motorsports	66	Jeffery MacZink	1
Toyota	Venturini Motorsports	66	Daniel Suárez	1
Toyota	Win-Tron Racing	32	Terry Jones	2
Chevrolet 7 Ford 1	Bobby Gerhart Racing	5	Bobby Gerhart	7
Chevrolet 7 Ford 1	Bobby Gerhart Racing	5	Clair Zimmerman	1
Chevrolet 6 Ford 2	Fast Track Racing	10	Dick Doheny	1
Chevrolet 6 Ford 2	Fast Track Racing	10	Ed Pompa	5
Chevrolet 6 Ford 2	Fast Track Racing	10	Rick Clifton	2
Chevrolet Ford	Josh Williams Motorsports	6	Josh Williams	11
Ford Chevrolet	Team Stange Racing 3 Finney Racing Enterprises 1	46	Maryeve Dufault	3
Ford Chevrolet	Team Stange Racing 3 Finney Racing Enterprises 1	46	Brian Finney	1

== Schedule ==
The 2014 series schedule was announced in December 2013.

No.	Race title	Track	Date	TV
1	Lucas Oil 200 presented by MAVTV American Real	Daytona International Speedway, Daytona Beach	February 15	FS1
2	ARCA Mobile 200	Mobile International Speedway, Irvington	March 22	
3	Federated Auto Parts ARCA 200 presented by Crunch 'N Nutter	Salem Speedway, Salem	April 27	
4	International Motorsports Hall of Fame 200	Talladega Superspeedway, Lincoln	May 3	FS1
5	Menards 200 presented by Federated Car Care	Toledo Speedway, Toledo	May 18	FS1
6	Great Railing 150	New Jersey Motorsports Park, Millville	June 1	
7	Pocono ARCA 200	Pocono Raceway, Long Pond	June 7	FS1
8	Corrigan Oil 200	Michigan International Speedway, Brooklyn	June 13	FS1
9	Akona 250 presented by Federated Car Care	Elko Speedway, Elko New Market, Minnesota	June 21	CBSSN
10	Herr's Chase The Taste 200	Winchester Speedway, Winchester	July 6	CBSSN
11	Ansell ActivArmr 150	Chicagoland Speedway, Joliet	July 19	FS2
12	SCOTT Get Geared Up 200	Lucas Oil Raceway, Brownsburg	July 25	FS1
13	ModSpace 125	Pocono Raceway, Long Pond	August 1	FS1
14	Federated Auto Parts 200	Berlin Raceway, Marne	August 9	
15	SuperChevyStores.com Allen Crowe 100	Illinois State Fairgrounds Racetrack, Springfield	August 17	
16	Madison ARCA 200	Madison International Speedway, Rutland	August 24	CBSSN
17	Southern Illinois 100	DuQuoin State Fairgrounds Racetrack, Du Quoin	September 1	
18	Federated Car Care ARCA Fall Classic presented by JayC Food Stores	Salem Speedway, Salem	September 13	
19	ZLOOP 150	Kentucky Speedway, Sparta	September 19	FS1
20	ARCA 98.9	Kansas Speedway, Kansas City, Kansas	October 3	FS2

== Results and standings ==
=== Races ===
No.	Race	Pole position	Most laps led	Winning driver	Manufacturer	No.	Winning team
1	Lucas Oil 200 presented by MAVTV American Real	Dylan Kwasniewski	Grant Enfinger	Grant Enfinger	Ford	90	Team BCR Racing
2	ARCA Mobile 200	Justin Boston	Grant Enfinger	Grant Enfinger	Ford	90	Team BCR Racing
3	Federated Auto Parts 200 presented by Crunch 'N Nutter	Justin Boston	Grant Enfinger	Grant Enfinger	Ford	90	Team BCR Racing
4	International Motorsports Hall of Fame 200	Grant Enfinger	Grant Enfinger	Tom Hessert III	Dodge	77	Cunningham Motorsports
5	Menards 200 presented by Federated Car Care	Mason Mitchell	Mason Mitchell	Justin Boston	Toyota	25	Venturini Motorsports
6	Great Railing 150	Andrew Ranger	Justin Boston	Andrew Ranger	Dodge	53	NDS Motorsports
7	Pocono ARCA 200	Kyle Larson	Kyle Larson	Kyle Larson	Chevrolet	4	Turner Scott Motorsports
8	Corrigan Oil 200	Mason Mitchell	Mason Mitchell	Austin Theriault	Toyota	66	Venturini Motorsports
9	Akona 250 presented by Federated Car Care	Justin Haley	Grant Enfinger	Grant Enfinger	Ford	90	Team BCR Racing
10	Herr's Chase The Taste 200	Ken Schrader	Mason Mitchell	Brandon Jones	Chevrolet	4	Turner Scott Motorsports
11	Ansell ActivArmr 150	John Wes Townley	Spencer Gallagher	Mason Mitchell	Ford	98	Mason Mitchell Motorsports
12	SCOTT Get Geared Up 200	Brandon Jones	Mason Mitchell	Brandon Jones	Chevrolet	4	Turner Scott Motorsports
13	ModSpace 125	Mason Mitchell	Brennan Poole	Justin Allison	Ford	88	Team BCR Racing
14	Federated Auto Parts 200	Mason Mitchell	Grant Enfinger	Grant Enfinger	Chevrolet	90	GMS Racing
15	SuperChevyStores.com Allen Crowe 100	Mason Mitchell	Grant Enfinger	Kevin Swindell	Toyota	15	Venturini Motorsports
16	Madison ARCA 200	Mason Mitchell	Grant Enfinger	Justin Boston	Toyota	25	Venturini Motorsports
17	Southern Illinois 100	Mason Mitchell	Grant Enfinger	Grant Enfinger	Chevrolet	90	GMS Racing
18	Federated Car Care ARCA Fall Classic presented by JayC Food Stores	Ken Schrader	Mason Mitchell	Tom Hessert III	Dodge	77	Cunningham Motorsports
19	ZLOOP 150	Justin Boston	Daniel Suárez	Brennan Poole	Toyota	15	Venturini Motorsports
20	ARCA 98.9	Mason Mitchell	Spencer Gallagher	Spencer Gallagher	Chevrolet	23	GMS Racing

=== Drivers' championship ===
(key) Bold - Pole position awarded by time. Italics - Pole position set by final practice results or rainout. * – Most laps led.

Pos	Driver	DAY	MOB	SAL	TAL	TOL	NJE	POC	MIC	ELK	WIN	CHI	LOR	POC	BER	ISF	MAD	DUQ	SAL	KEN	KAN	Points
1	Mason Mitchell	7	3	7	4	**2***	10	2	**2***	10	2*	1	20*	**7**	**10**	**2**	**14**	**4**	2*	3	**5**	5240
2	Grant Enfinger	1*	1*	1*	**9***	12	4	8	8	1*	5	7	4	26	1*	3*	15*	1*	4	30	17	4985
3	Tom Hessert III	4	10	5	1	20	9	16	12	2	13	9	9	3	5	11	5	8	1	10	11	4795
4	Frank Kimmel	2	5	3	8	14	5	7	7	11	9	10	3	20	6	4	4	3	24	11	21	4725
5	Justin Boston	40	**20**	**15**	12	1	7*	22	21	4	3	2	8	5	7	7	1	2	20	**9**	7	4665
6	Austin Wayne Self	DNQ	12	4	3	8	24	24	9	8	10	20	2	8	2	10	8	10	3	12	22	4415
7	Thomas Praytor	31	11	11	22	21	15	13	14	15	12	18	16	16	20	15	13	13	13	21	20	3950
8	John Wes Townley	11	8	22	2	5	14	3	4	9	8	**22**	6				10	12			6	3295
9	James Swanson		24	27		27	18		22	18	15	19	22	17	16	14	12	18	12	22	23	2785
10	Karl Weber		19	14		10	13	10	DNS	17	11	DNS	14	12	11	29	20	28	18	28		2735
11	Brad Smith					23	16		17	19	18	25	24	19	18	20	19	15	22	26	19	2450
12	Spencer Gallagher	20^{1}	7	2	5	13	17	11	5	12		6*									1*	2320
13	Josh Williams			6	11	11	11	6	10	6	14	11		Wth						13	2	2280
14	Cody Coughlin		13	9		6		9	13		7	5	11	9						4	4	2080
15	Ken Schrader			8		4			11	5	**4**		7		9	8		6	**5**			2000
16	Bill Catania			17		16		21	16	13		15		18	15	Wth	18	14	9		16	1820
17	Matt Tifft		6			3	3	19				3	5	22			9			2	28	1820
18	Will Kimmel	38			36			4	6		16	4		2		5	27	21		6	29	1800
19	Justin Allison	36	Wth		19	7		5	3			8	13	1						7	9	1785
20	Michael Lira		9	18		9	12			14	17		12	10	12				27	16		1750
21	Kyle Weatherman			10							21		10		4		7	9	11	8		1440
22	Kyle Benjamin		2	12		19	6			7							2			7		1330
23	Tim Viens	22	23	26	23	25^{2}	20	30				21		25							33	1310
24	Brennan Poole							QL						4*	3	23	22	5	6	1		1290
25	Chris Bailey Jr.	16		29		26		29	24	20		24	30		22	26		DNS	29		32	1250
26	Wayne Peterson			28		QL	DNS		26	23	19		28	31	24	30	28		30	33		1080
27	Bobby Gerhart	6			7			12					18	23						17	27	1065
28	Justin Haley					18				**3**	6		26		8				8			1055
29	Roger Carter											23		11	17	16	25	25		31	31	945
30	Darrell Basham		22	23			19	20	23		Wth								15	25		875
31	Ed Pompa	26			21			15						13					17		15	845
32	A. J. Fike												21		13	13	24	11	Wth			750
33	Tom Berte							17				13		15						20	24	705
34	Anderson Bowen		4								20						6		16			700
35	Brian Finney		14	13									23			21			21			690
36	Dale Shearer			20												18		17	19		26	650
37	Brandon Jones			Wth							1		**1**				3					600
38	Leilani Munter	28			14							12									12	590
39	Rick Clifton				32			26	19			17								24		560
40	Blake Hillard			16									17						10			475
41	Mark Meunier		25	22	DNQ															32	18	460
42	Mike Buckley					17			18											23		400
43	Maryeve Dufault	18	17		25																	395
44	Ray Ciccarelli										Wth		19		19	22						390
45	Buster Graham	35			10							16										390
46	Con Nicolopoulos																21		26	29	30	390
47	Brent Cross	DNQ			33			25						29		27						375
48	Ryan Unzicker															12		7				365
49	Jay Curry					22	21	23		Wth												360
50	Barry Fitzgerald	19			27										21							355
51	Chris Brown					24																350
52	Brandon Gdovic																			15	8	345
53	Nick Igdalsky							18						6								340
54	Derrick Lancaster	13			6																	340
55	Shane Cockrum															9		22				305
56	Bo LeMastus																			18	13	305
57	Clay Campbell	3			29																	300
58	Kelly Kovski															6		26				300
59	Ron Cox								15							19						290
60	Tyler Audie																17			19		280
61	Ben Rhodes																11			27		275
62	Wayne Edwards					15							25									260
63	Michael Self		18				22															260
64	Terry Jones	8			34																	255
65	Mark Littleton															17		24				255
66	Kyle Larson							**1***														250
67	Kyle Martel							14						28								250
68	Andrew Ranger						**1**					Wth		Wth								245
69	Austin Theriault								1													240
70	Kevin Swindell															1						230
71	Bob Strait															28		19				225
72	Matt Kurzejewski	32			16																	220
73	Katlynn Leer																	23	25			220
74	Daniel Suárez																			5*		220
75	Brian Wong						2															220
76	Ross Kenseth																				3	215
77	Steve Fox						23	27														210
78	Tyler Reddick	5																				205
79	Joey Gattina		21		31																	200
80	Don Thompson							28						24								200
81	Mark Thompson	37			15																	200
82	Barry Layne			24									29									195
83	Raúl Orlandini Jr.						8															190
84	Dave Savicki		26			28																190
85	Scott Sheldon	QL			13																	190
86	Chase Elliott	9																				185
87	Sean Corr	10																				180
88	Dylan Kwasniewski	**14**																				180
89	John Lowinski-Loh																				10	180
90	Scotty Hubler	33			24																	175
91	Tom Woodin												31		26							175
93	Bryan Silas	12																				170
94	Bobby Grewohl	24	Wth		35																	165
95	Mike Affarano											Wth		14								160
96	Cody Erickson																		14			160
97	Devin Steele													Wth						14		160
98	Jerry Tunney											14										160
99	Clair Zimmerman														14							160
100	Charles Evans Jr.																				14	160
101	Dustin Knowles		15																			155
102	Shannon McIntosh												15									155
103	Brian Rose	15																				155
104	David Sear								20											DNS		155
105	Christian Celaya																16					150
106	Joseph Hughs									16												150
107	Darin Matthews		16																			150
108	Tanner Tallarico																	16				150
109	Tom Buzze	17																				145
110	Kevin Powell				17																	145
111	Garrett Smithley				18																	140
112	Ryan Heavner		Wth	19																		135
113	Alex Guenette				20																	130
114	Galen Hassler											26									25	130
115	Tyler Speer																	20				130
116	Nick Barstad									21												125
117	Alx Danielsson	21																				125
118	Brian Kaltreider													21								125
119	Jon Haney									22												120
120	Mario Gosselin	23																				115
121	Emerson Newton-John																23					115
122	Brian Norton														23							115
123	Josh Reeves																		23			115
124	Brad Dubil															24						110
125	Frankie Kimmel			25																		105
126	Jeffery MacZink														25							105
127	Dale Matchett															25						105
128	Steve Minghenelli						25															105
129	Tommy O'Leary IV								25													105
130	Kody Weisner	25																				105
131	Bryan Dauzat	Wth			26	Wth																100
132	Kenny Mathews																26					100
133	Jared Marks	27																				95
134	Mike Senica												27									95
135	Joe Walsh																	27				95
136	Billy Alger																		28			90
137	Benny Chastain				28																	90
138	Jeb Burton	29																				85
139	Brad Stiffler																	29				85
140	Dick Doheny	30																				80
141	Donnie Neuenberger				30																	80
142	Evan Pardo													30								80
143	Mark Lambert												32									70
144	B. J. McLeod													27								70
145	Benny Gordon	34																				60
146	Cole Powell	39																				35
147	Clayton Weatherman																		DNS			25
148	Jami Weimer										DNS											25
	Alex Malycke		Wth	Wth		Wth											Wth		Wth			0

Notes

- ^{1} – #23 Spencer Gallagher was not able to qualify at Daytona. Later he moved to Scott Sheldon's car (#20) and drove it in the race.
- ^{2} – #97 Tim Viens was not able to qualify at Toledo. Later he moved to Wayne Peterson's car (#06) and drove it in the race.

== See also ==
- 2014 NASCAR Sprint Cup Series
- 2014 NASCAR Nationwide Series
- 2014 NASCAR Camping World Truck Series
- 2014 NASCAR K&N Pro Series East
- 2014 NASCAR K&N Pro Series West
- 2014 NASCAR Whelen Modified Tour
- 2014 NASCAR Whelen Southern Modified Tour
- 2014 NASCAR Canadian Tire Series
- 2014 NASCAR Toyota Series
- 2014 NASCAR Whelen Euro Series
