= Rutland, Wisconsin =

- Town
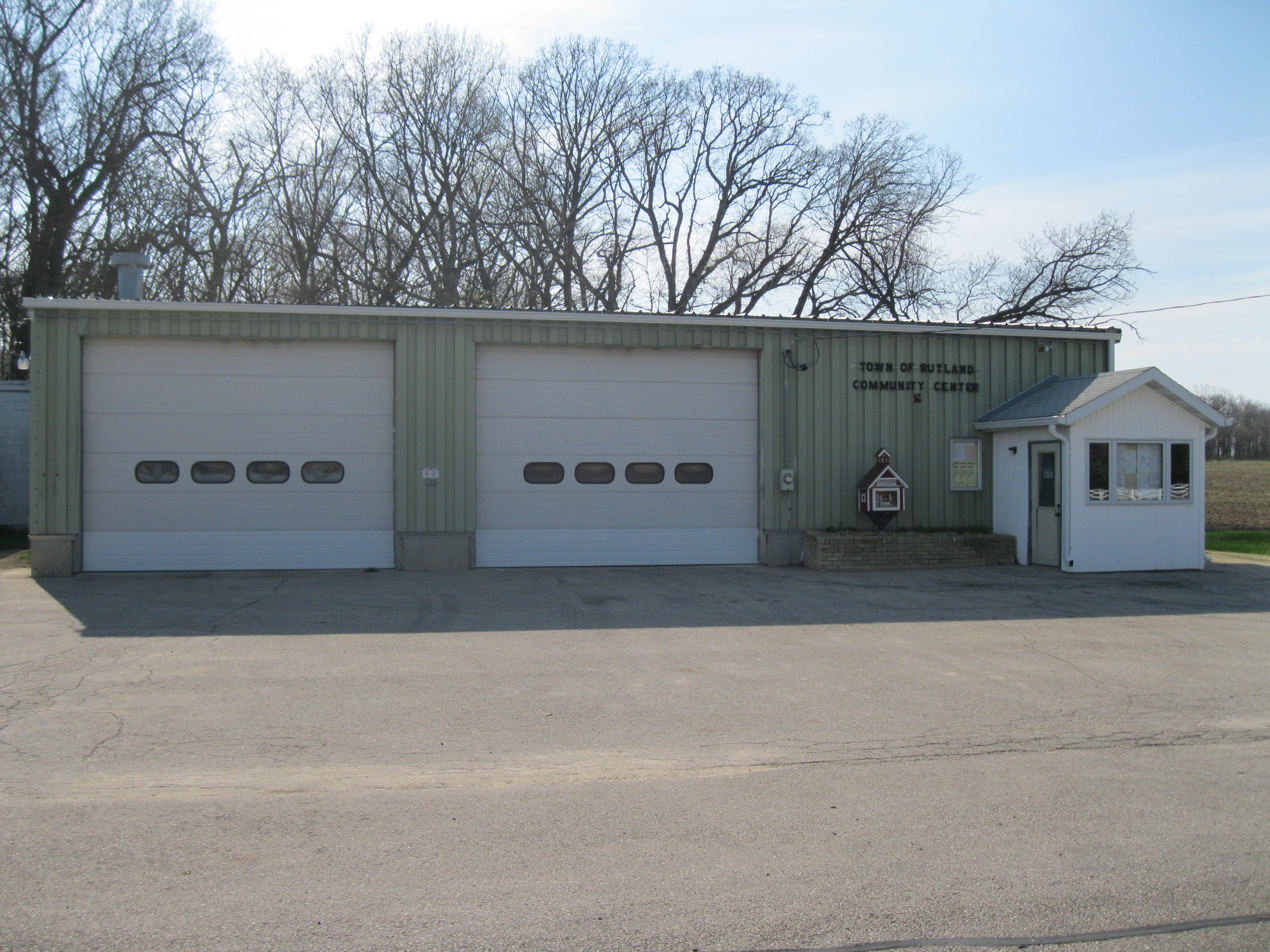
- Rutland town hall

- Location in Dane County and the state of Wisconsin.
- Coordinates: 42°53′3″N 89°18′55″W
- Country: United States
- State: Wisconsin
- County: Dane

Area
  - Total: 35.4 sq mi (91.7 km^{2})
  - Land: 35.3 sq mi (91.3 km^{2})
  - Water: 0.15 sq mi (0.4 km^{2})
- Elevation: 892 ft (272 m)

Population (2020)
  - Total: 1,977
  - Density: 54/sq mi (20.7/km^{2})
- Time zone: UTC-6 (Central (CST))
  - Summer (DST): UTC-5 (CDT)
- Area code: 608
- FIPS code: 55-70400
- GNIS feature ID: 1584083

Rutland is a town in Dane County, Wisconsin, United States. The population was 1,977 by the US Census Bureau 2020 census The population was 1,887 at the 2000 census. However, for 2021, the Wisconsin Dept. of Administration declared the population of the Town to be 2,032. The unincorporated communities of Rutland and Stone are located in the town.

== Geography ==
According to the United States Census Bureau, the town has a total area of 35.4 square miles (91.7 km^{2}), of which 35.3 square miles (91.3 km^{2}) is land and 0.1 square mile (0.4 km^{2}) (0.40%) is water.

== Demographics ==
At the 2020 census of 2020, there were 1,977 residents in the Town. However, according to the Wisconsin Dept. of Administration, in 2021, they declared the population to be 2,032.

Previously, at the 2000 census there were 1,887 people, 689 households, and 560 families in the town. The population density was 53.5 people per square mile (20.7/km^{2}). There were 704 housing units at an average density of 20.0 per square mile (7.7/km^{2}). The racial makeup of the town was 98.20% White, 0.32% African American, 0.79% Asian, 0.26% from other races, and 0.42% from two or more races. Hispanic or Latino of any race were 1.17%.

Of the 689 households 39.6% had children under the age of 18 living with them, 71.8% were married couples living together, 5.8% had a female householder with no husband present, and 18.6% were non-families. 13.6% of households were one person and 3.9% were one person aged 65 or older. The average household size was 2.72 and the average family size was 2.98.

The age distribution was 27.3% under the age of 18, 4.6% from 18 to 24, 32.8% from 25 to 44, 27.8% from 45 to 64, and 7.6% 65 or older. The median age was 39 years. For every 100 females, there were 105.8 males. For every 100 females age 18 and over, there were 107.4 males.

The median household income was $64,740 and the median family income was $66,333. Males had a median income of $38,681 versus $30,250 for females. The per capita income for the town was $27,695. About 0.7% of families and 1.3% of the population were below the poverty line, including 1.3% of those under age 18 and 4.2% of those age 65 or over.

== Municipal services ==
Municipal sewer and water services are not available within the town; some areas are served by a natural gas utility. Law enforcement services are provided by the Dane County Sheriff's Department. The town is served by fire and emergency medical services departments from Stoughton, Brooklyn and Oregon.

== Economy ==
Madison International Speedway is located near Wisconsin Highway 138 in Rutland.

== Notable people ==
- Sereno W. Graves, Wisconsin State Representative
- Arthur H. Sholts, Wisconsin State Representative and educator, was born in the town
