= ARCA races at Madison =

ARCA Menards Series race at Madison International Speedway

Atlas 200
ARCA Menards Series
- Venue: Madison International Speedway
- Location: Rutland, Wisconsin, United States
- First race: 2011
- Distance: 100 mi (160.934 km)
- Laps: 200
- Previous names: Herr's Live With Flavor! 200 (2011); Herr's Live Life With Flavor 200 (2012–2014); Montgomery Ward Fathers Day 200 (2016); Montgomery Ward 200 (2017); Herr's Potato Chips 200 (2018); Shore Lunch 200 (2019); Badger 200 (2025)
- Most wins (driver): Chandler Smith (2)
- Most wins (team): Venturini Motorsports (5)
- Most wins (manufacturer): Toyota (7)

Circuit information
- Surface: Asphalt
- Length: 0.50 mi (0.80 km)
- Turns: 4

The Atlas 200 is an ARCA Menards Series race held at the Madison International Speedway in Rutland, Wisconsin. Tristan McKee is the defending race winner.

== History ==
The race is 200 laps (100 miles) in length. The race was removed from the schedule in 2020 but returned in 2025 under the "Badger 200". The next year, the race was sponsored by Atlas Roofing, who previously sponsored the race at Iowa.

== Past winners ==
Year	Date	Driver	Team	Manufacturer	Race Distance		Race Time	Average Speed (mph)	Report	Ref
Year	Date	Driver	Team	Manufacturer	Laps	Miles (km)	Race Time	Average Speed (mph)	Report	Ref
2011	August 26	Alex Bowman	Venturini Motorsports	Toyota	200	100 (160.934)	1:42:50	58.344	Report	
2012	August 26	Chris Buescher	Roulo Brothers Racing	Ford	208*	104 (167.372)	1:29:28	69.746	Report	
2013	August 25	Kyle Benjamin	Venturini Motorsports	Toyota	200	100 (160.934)	1:15:44	79.21	Report	
2014	August 24	Justin Boston	Venturini Motorsports	Toyota	200	100 (160.934)	1:18:02	76.896	Report	
2015	Not held									
2016	June 19	Josh Williams	Josh Williams Motorsports	Chevrolet	200	100 (160.934)	2:23:46	71.627	Report	
2017	June 23	Austin Theriault	Ken Schrader Racing	Toyota	200	100 (160.934)	1:37:30	61.532	Report	
2018	June 15	Chandler Smith	Venturini Motorsports	Toyota	200	100 (160.934)	1:25:01	70.57	Report	
2019	June 22	Chandler Smith	Venturini Motorsports	Toyota	200	100 (160.934)	1:29:09	67.302	Report	
2020 – 2024	Not held									
2025	August 22	Max Reaves	Joe Gibbs Racing	Toyota	200	100 (160.934)	1:25:36	70.093	Report	
2026	August 28	Tristan McKee	Pinnacle Racing Group	Chevrolet	200	100 (160.934)			Report	

=== Multiple winners (drivers) ===
# Wins	Team	Years won
2	Chandler Smith	2018–2019

=== Multiple winners (teams) ===
# Wins	Team	Years won
5	Venturini Motorsports	2011, 2013–2014, 2018–2019

=== Manufacturer wins ===
# Wins	Team	Years won
7	Toyota	2011, 2013–2014, 2017–2019, 2025
2	Chevrolet	2016, 2026
1	Ford	2012

- 2012: Race extended due to a Green–white–checker finish.

Previous race: Calypso 100	ARCA Menards Series; Atlas 200	Next race: Audubon Park 100
