= ARCA races at Pocono =

ARCA Menards Series race at Pocono

ARCA Menards Series at Pocono

ARCA Menards Series
- Venue: Pocono Raceway
- Location: Long Pond, Pennsylvania, United States

Circuit information
- Surface: Asphalt
- Length: 2.5 mi (4.0 km)
- Turns: 3

Stock car racing events in the ARCA Menards Series were held at Pocono Raceway, in Long Pond, Pennsylvania during numerous seasons and times of year since 1969.

== Former race ==
Sunset Hill Shooting Range 150
- First race: 1969
- Last race: 2026
- Distance: 150 mi (240 km)
- Laps: 60
- Previous names: Quaker State 150 (1983); Champion Spark Plug 100 (1987–1989); Champion Spark Plug 150 (1990, 1993); Champion Batteries 150 (1991–1992); Pocono ARCA 150 (1994); Equipment Supply 150 (1995); Syracuse Grand Prix 400K (1996); Mountain Dew 400K (1997–1998); Pocono ARCA 200 (1999–2000, 2002, 2004, 2011–2015); Pocono ARCA Re/Max 200 (2001); Giant 200 (2003); Pocono 200 (2005–2009); Messina Wildlife Animal Stopper 200 (2010); General Tire #AnywhereIsPossible 200 (2016–2021); General Tire Delivers 200 (2022); Sunset Hill Shooting Range 150 (2023, 2026)
- Most wins (driver): Bob Schacht; Tim Steele (4)
- Most wins (team): Steele Racing (4)
- Most wins (manufacturer): Chevrolet (10)

The Sunset Hill Shooting Range 150 was a 150-mile (240 km) annual ARCA Menards Series race held at Pocono Raceway in Long Pond, Pennsylvania.

=== History ===
ARCA ran at Pocono Raceway for the first time in 1969 on a .75-mile (1.21 km) paved oval, two years before the modern superspeedway was opened. That race was won by Bobby Watson. The series would not return to the track until 1983, when it ran just one year, this time on the 2.5-mile (4.0 km) superspeedway. The series would take another hiatus at the track, not returning until 1987. That year, the race returned to the calendar, and has remained ever since. From 1988 to 2019, a second race was held at the track. The second race was removed for the 2020 season.

In 2023, the race was shortened from 200-mile (320 km)s to 150-mile (240 km)s, making it the same length as the track's Truck Series race on the same weekend. (ARCA races on the same weekend at the same track as Truck Series races were rarely ever longer than Truck Series races.) Sunset Hill Shooting Range was the sponsor for the race. In 2024, the race was removed from the schedule. The race was announced to return in 2026 before the full-ARCA schedule was released, along with the Chicagoland race. Sunset Hill Shooting Range returned as the title sponsor. The race did not return in 2027.

=== Past winners ===
Year	Date	No.	Driver	Team	Manufacturer	Race Distance		Report	Ref
Year	Date	No.	Driver	Team	Manufacturer	Laps	Miles (km)	Report	Ref
.75-mile (1.21 km) paved oval
1969	May 30	N/A	Bobby Watson	N/A	Dodge	200	150 (241.402)	Report	
1970 – 1982	Not held								
2.5-mile (4.0 km) paved superspeedway
1983	July 23	75	Bob Schacht	Tom Reet Racing	Pontiac	60	150 (241.402)	Report	
1984 – 1986	Not held								
1987	June 13	75	Bob Schacht	Tom Reet Racing	Buick	40	100 (160.934)	Report	
1988	June 18	1	Lee Raymond	Coyle Racing	Chevrolet	40	100 (160.934)	Report	
1989	June 17	75	Bob Schacht	Tom Reet Racing/Bob Schacht Motorsports	Buick	40	100 (160.934)	Report	
1990	June 16	80	Jimmy Horton	S & H Racing	Pontiac	60	150 (241.402)	Report	
1991	June 15	29	Bob Keselowski	K-Automotive Racing	Chevrolet	60	150 (241.402)	Report	
1992	June 13	37	Ben Hess	Jim Spicuzza	Oldsmobile	60	150 (241.402)	Report	
1993	June 12	75	Bob Schacht	Bob Schacht Motorsports	Oldsmobile	60	150 (241.402)	Report	
1994	July 14	16	Tim Steele	Steele Racing	Ford	60	150 (241.402)	Report	
1995	July 13	90	Mike Wallace	Owen Racing	Ford	60	150 (241.402)	Report	
1996	June 15	20	Mike Wallace	Active Motorsports	Chevrolet	100	250 (402.336)	Report	
1997	June 7	16	Tim Steele	Steele Racing	Ford	100	250 (402.336)	Report	
1998	June 20	16	Tim Steele	Steele Racing	Ford	100	250 (402.336)	Report	
1999	June 19	46	Frank Kimmel	Clement Racing	Chevrolet	80	200 (321.869)	Report	
2000	June 17	2	Kerry Earnhardt	Dale Earnhardt, Inc.	Chevrolet	80	200 (321.869)	Report	
2001	June 16	16	Tim Steele	Steele Racing	Ford	80	200 (321.869)	Report	
2002	June 8	22	Damon Lusk	WP Motorsports	Chevrolet	86*	215 (346.009)	Report	
2003	July 25	77	Casey Mears	Chip Ganassi Racing	Dodge	80	200 (321.869)	Report	
2004	June 12	99	Scott Riggs	MBV Motorsports	Pontiac	80	200 (321.869)	Report	
2005	June 11	27	Travis Kvapil	Penske Racing	Dodge	80	200 (321.869)	Report	
2006	June 10	4	Chase Miller	Cunningham Motorsports	Dodge	88*	220 (354.056)	Report	
2007	June 9	62	Chad McCumbee	Petty Enterprises	Dodge	80	200 (321.869)	Report	
2008	June 7	99	Ricky Stenhouse Jr.	Roush Fenway Racing	Ford	86*	215 (346.009)	Report	
2009	June 6	25	Joey Logano	Venturini Motorsports	Toyota	80	200 (321.869)	Report	
2010	June 5	81	Craig Goess	Eddie Sharp Racing	Toyota	80	200 (321.869)	Report	
2011	June 11	31	Tim George Jr.	Richard Childress Racing	Chevrolet	59*	147.5 (237.378)	Report	
2012	June 9	25	Brennan Poole	Venturini Motorsports	Toyota	80	200 (321.869)	Report	
2013	June 8	9	Chase Elliott	Hendrick Motorsports	Chevrolet	80	200 (321.869)	Report	
2014	June 7	4	Kyle Larson	Turner Scott Motorsports	Chevrolet	80	200 (321.869)	Report	
2015	June 6	22	Trevor Bayne	Cunningham Motorsports	Ford	80	200 (321.869)	Report	
2016	June 3	23	Grant Enfinger	GMS Racing	Chevrolet	80	200 (321.869)	Report	
2017	June 9	18	Riley Herbst	Joe Gibbs Racing	Toyota	80	200 (321.869)	Report	
2018	June 1	12	Harrison Burton	MDM Motorsports	Toyota	80	200 (321.869)	Report	
2019	May 31	22	Ty Majeski	Chad Bryant Racing	Ford	80	200 (321.869)	Report	
2020	June 26	18	Ty Gibbs	Joe Gibbs Racing	Toyota	80	200 (321.869)	Report	
2021	June 25	25	Corey Heim	Venturini Motorsports	Toyota	80	200 (321.869)	Report	
2022	July 22	17	Taylor Gray	David Gilliland Racing	Ford	64*	160 (257.495)	Report	
2023	July 22*	20	Jesse Love	Venturini Motorsports	Toyota	60	150 (241.402)	Report	
2024 – 2025	Not held								
2026	June 12	18	Gio Ruggiero	Joe Gibbs Racing	Toyota	60	150 (241.402)	Report	

Notes:

- 2002, 2006, 2008: Race extended due to green/white/checker.
- 2011: Race shortened due to fog.
- 2022: Race shortened due to darkness.
- 2023: Race postponed to Saturday morning due to rain

==== Multiple winners (drivers) ====
# Wins	Team	Years won
4	Bob Schacht	1983, 1987, 1989, 1993
4	Tim Steele	1994, 1997, 1998, 2001
2	Mike Wallace	1995, 1996

==== Multiple winners (teams) ====
# Wins	Team	Years won
4	Steele Racing	1994, 1997, 1998, 2001
4	Venturini Motorsports	2009, 2012, 2021, 2023
3	Tom Reet Racing	1983, 1987, 1989*
3	Joe Gibbs Racing	2017, 2020, 2026
2	Bob Schacht Motorsports	1989*, 1993

Note: In 1989, Bob Schacht was listed as the owner, but sponsored by Tom Reet Racing.

==== Manufacturer wins ====
# Wins	Manufacturer	Years won
10	Chevrolet	1988, 1991, 1996, 1999, 2000, 2002, 2011, 2013, 2014, 2016
9	Toyota	2009, 2010, 2012, 2017, 2018, 2020, 2021, 2023, 2026
8	Ford	1994, 1995, 1997, 1998, 2001, 2008, 2015, 2019
5	Dodge	1969, 2003, 2005, 2006, 2007
2	Pontiac	1983, 1990
2	Buick	1987, 1988
2	Oldsmobile	1992, 1993

== Second former race ==
FORTS USA 150
- First race: 2010
- Last race: 2019
- Distance: 150 mi (241.402 km)
- Laps: 60
- Previous names: Weis Markets 125 (2010); Pennsylvania ARCA 125 (2011–2012); ModSpace 125 (2013–2015); ModSpace 150 (2016–2018); FORTS USA 150 (2019)
- Most wins (manufacturer): Chevrolet (4)

The FORTS USA 150 was an event in the ARCA Racing Series, held in late July or early August at the Pocono Raceway in Long Pond, Pennsylvania from 2010 to 2019.

=== Past winners ===
Year	Driver	Team	Manufacturer	Race Distance		Report	Ref
Year	Driver	Team	Manufacturer	Laps	Miles (km)	Report	Ref
2010	Robb Brent	Allgaier Motorsports	Dodge	50	125 (201.168)	Report	
2011	Ty Dillon	Richard Childress Racing	Chevrolet	50	125 (201.168)	Report	
2012	Chad Hackenbracht	CGH Motorsports	Chevrolet	50	125 (201.168)	Report	
2013	Corey LaJoie	Randy LaJoie Racing	Ford	50	125 (201.168)	Report	
2014	Justin Allison	Team BCR Racing	Ford	50	125 (201.168)	Report	
2015	Cole Custer	JR Motorsports	Chevrolet	50	125 (201.168)	Report	
2016	Chase Briscoe	Cunningham Motorsports	Ford	60	150 (241.402)	Report	
2017	Justin Haley	Mason Mitchell Motorsports	Chevrolet	60	150 (241.402)	Report	
2018	Zane Smith	MDM Motorsports	Toyota	33*	82.5 (132.771)	Report	
2019	Christian Eckes	Venturini Motorsports	Toyota	60	150 (241.402)	Report	

- 2018: Race shortened.

==== Manufacturer wins ====
# Wins	Manufacturer	Years won
4	Chevrolet	2011, 2012, 2015, 2017
3	Ford	2013, 2014, 2016
2	Toyota	2018, 2019
1	Dodge	2010
