= Buster Graham =

American racing driver

- Born: February 11, 1966 (age 60); Lafayette, Louisiana, U.S.

ARCA Menards Series career
- 25 races run over 5 years
- Best finish: 23rd (2012)
- First race: 2011 Pocono ARCA 200 (Pocono)
- Last race: 2015 International Motorsports Hall of Fame 200 (Talladega)
Wins	Top tens	Poles
0	3	0
- Statistics up to date as of June 20, 2023.

Buster Graham (born February 11, 1966) is an American professional stock car racing driver who has previously competed in the ARCA Racing Series from 2011 to 2015.

== Racing career ==
In 2011, Graham would make his ARCA Racing Series debut at Pocono Raceway driving the No. 59 Dodge for Mark Gibson Racing, where he would finish twentieth after starting 21st. He would return with the team at Iowa Speedway, where he would finish fifteenth. In the series' return to Pocono in August, Graham would be involved in a crash on the second lap involving Kyle Martel, Tom Berte, Brandon Kidd, and Brent Brevak, where Graham's car would be hit by Kidd's car, leading Graham to slide through the infield grass and eventually striking a paved path and launched over the third-tier guardrail wall before coming to read just inside the guardrail. He would be classified in 37th position. He would return at Kansas Speedway later in the year, this time in a Ford, where he would finish twentieth. It was also during this year that he would make select starts in the X-1R Pro Cup Series with a best finish of tenth at Dillon Motor Speedway.

In December 2011, it was announced that Graham would run a minimum of ten races for Team BCR Racing driving the No. 88 Ford for the 2012 season. In eleven starts, he would get a best finish of tenth at Michigan International Speedway. He would return with the team for 2013, this time only running five races, and would get a best result of ninth at Michigan.

In 2014, Graham would join Roulo Brothers Racing in the No. 99 Ford at the season opening race at Daytona International Speedway. He would officially start third after ARCA had disqualified multiple cars in post-qualifying inspections, with some of the drivers affected including Bobby Gerhart, Justin Boston, and Spencer Gallagher. In the race, Graham was running within the top-ten until the thirteenth lap, where he was involved in an incident with Chase Elliott that would ultimately collect multiple cars, leading to a confrontation involving crew members of Graham's team and members of Elliott's team. He would return with the team at Talladega Superspeedway, where he finished in tenth after starting seventeenth. He would also make a start at Chicagoland Speedway, this time driving the No. 47 Ford for Team Stange Racing where he would start seventeenth and finish sixteenth. In 2015, he would return to Roulo Brothers Racing for Daytona and Talladega, this time in the No. 17 Ford with sponsorship from Louisiana Tech University, finishing 37th at Daytona due to a crash, and finishing twelfth at Talladega after starting fourteenth. The Talladega event would be his most recent ARCA event, as he had not competed in the series since then.

== Motorsports results ==
=== ARCA Racing Series ===
(key) (Bold – Pole position awarded by qualifying time. Italics – Pole position earned by points standings or practice time. * – Most laps led.)

ARCA Racing Series results
Year	Team	No.	Make	1	2	3	4	5	6	7	8	9	10	11	12	13	14	15	16	17	18	19	20	21	ARSC	Pts	Ref
2011	Mark Gibson Racing	59	Dodge	DAY	TAL	SLM	TOL	NJE	CHI	POC; 20	MCH	WIN	BLN	IOW; 15	IRP	POC; 37	ISF	MAD	DSF	SLM					51st	460	
2011	Mark Gibson Racing	59	Ford																		KAN; 20	TOL			51st	460	
2012	Team BCR Racing	88	Ford	DAY; 17	MOB; 23	SLM	TAL; 15	TOL; 23	ELK	POC; 16	MCH; 10	WIN	NJE	IOW; 19	CHI; 19	IRP; 16	POC; 18	BLN	ISF	MAD	SLM	DSF	KAN; 27		23rd	1515	
2013	Team BCR Racing	88	Ford	DAY; 17	MOB	SLM	TAL; 17	TOL	ELK	POC; 13	MCH; 9	ROA	WIN	CHI	NJM	POC; 20	BLN	ISF	MAD	DSF	IOW	SLM	KEN	KAN	36th	770	
2014	Roulo Brothers Racing	99	Ford	DAY; 35	MOB	SLM	TAL; 10	TOL	NJE	POC	MCH	ELK	WIN												45th	390	
2014	Team Stange Racing	47	Ford											CHI; 16	IRP	POC	BLN	ISF	MAD	DSF	SLM	KEN	KAN		45th	390	
2015	Roulo Brothers Racing	17	Ford	DAY; 37	MOB	NSH	SLM	TAL; 12	TOL	NJE	POC	MCH	CHI	WIN	IOW	IRP	POC	BLN	ISF	DSF	SLM	KEN	KAN		87th	215	
