= Brent Brevak =

American racing driver

- Born: January 17, 1988 (age 38); Ashland, Wisconsin, U.S.

ARCA Menards Series career
- 11 races run over 3 years
- Best finish: 46th (2011)
- First race: 2009 ARCA Re/Max Carolina 200 (Rockingham)
- Last race: 2011 Federated Car Care 200 (Toledo)
| Wins | Top tens | Poles |
|---|---|---|
| 0 | 1 | 0 |
- Statistics up to date as of July 7, 2023.

Brent Brevak (born January 17, 1988) is an American professional stock car racing driver who has previously competed in the ARCA Racing Series. He is the son of former NASCAR driver, team owner, and 1990 ARCA champion Bob Brevak.

== Racing career ==
Brevak starting racing at the age of thirteen, competing in MKA go-karts, before moving to dirt cars from the age fifteen. In 2006, he would start competing on asphalt at Madison International Speedway.

In 2008, Brevak would compete in the ASA North Late Model Series, finishing 16th in the final points with a best finish of 16th at I-70 Motorsports Park despite failing to qualify for the first two races of the season. He would return to the series the following year, this time finishing ninth in the points with a best finish of eighth at the season opening race at Toledo Speedway. It was also during this year that Brevak would make his debut in the ARCA Re/Max Series debut at Rockingham Speedway, driving the family owned No. 31 Dodge, where he would start sixteenth and finish 35th due to a crash early in the race. He would also enter in the race at Kentucky Speedway, this time in the No. 34, where would be classified in 39th after failing to take the start. He would enter three races in 2010 in the No. 3 Dodge, running at Salem Speedway, where he would finish 28th due to a crash, Michigan International Speedway, where he would finish in 29th, and Iowa Speedway, where he would be classified in 37th after failing to start due to handling issues.

In 2011, Brevak would run at Daytona International Speedway and Talladega Superspeedway, finishing 38th at Daytona due to a broken wheel stud, and 26th at Talladega after running in the top-fifteen for the majority of the race. He would then run at Chicagoland Speedway, where he would start nineteenth and finish ninth, his first top-ten and his best career finish. He would not return to the series until the Pocono Raceway event in August, where he would be involved in an incident on the third lap involving Buster Graham, Tom Berte, Brandon Kidd, and Kyle Martel, where Graham's car would launch over the third-tier guardrail on the inside of the first turn of the track; Brevak would be classified in 39th. Despite this, he would return at Madison International Speedway, where he would qualify in the tenth position but finish 25th due to clutch issues. He would run one more race at the season ending race at Toledo, where he would finish 33rd due to engine issues. He has not competed in the series since then.

== Personal life ==
In 2011, Brevak received his bachelor's degree in broadcast journalism from the University of Wisconsin–Eau Claire. He also works as a top sale associate for Scheels All Sports in Eau Claire, Wisconsin.

== Motorsports results ==
=== ARCA Racing Series ===
(key) (Bold – Pole position awarded by qualifying time. Italics – Pole position earned by points standings or practice time. * – Most laps led.)

ARCA Racing Series results
| Year | Team | No. | Make | 1 | 2 | 3 | 4 | 5 | 6 | 7 | 8 | 9 | 10 | 11 | 12 | 13 | 14 | 15 | 16 | 17 | 18 | 19 | 20 | 21 | ARSC | Pts | Ref |
|---|---|---|---|---|---|---|---|---|---|---|---|---|---|---|---|---|---|---|---|---|---|---|---|---|---|---|---|
| 2009 | Brevak Racing | 31 | Dodge | DAY | SLM | CAR; 35 | TAL | KEN | TOL | POC | MCH | MFD | IOW | | | | | | | | | | | | 146th | 80 | |
| 2009 | Brevak Racing | 34 | Dodge | | | | | | | | | | | KEN; 39 | BLN | POC | ISF | CHI | TOL | DSF | NJE | SLM | KAN | CAR | 146th | 80 | |
| 2010 | Brevak Racing | 3 | Dodge | DAY | PBE | SLM; 28 | TEX | TAL | TOL | POC | MCH; 29 | IOW; 37 | MFD | POC | BLN | NJE | ISF | CHI | DSF | TOL | SLM | KAN | CAR | | 79th | 220 | |
| 2011 | Brevak Racing | 3 | Ford | DAY; 38 | TAL; 26 | SLM | TOL | NJE | | | | | | | | | | | | | | | | | 46th | 530 | |
| 2011 | Brevak Racing | 3 | Dodge | | | | | | CHI; 9 | POC | MCH | WIN | BLN | IOW | IRP | POC; 39 | ISF | MAD; 25 | DSF | SLM | KAN | TOL; 33 | | | 46th | 530 | |
