= Kevin Belmont =

American racing driver (born 1964)

- Born: February 7, 1964 (age 62); Feasterville, Pennsylvania, U.S.

ARCA Menards Series career
- 53 races run over 5 years
- Best finish: 11th (2001), (2002)
- First race: 2000 Astral Carrier ARCA 250 (Winchester)
- Last race: 2009 Hantz Group 200 (Mansfield)
Wins	Top tens	Poles
0	5	0
- Statistics up to date as of January 17, 2024.

Kevin Belmont (born February 7, 1964) is an American former professional stock car racing driver and crew chief who has previously competed in the ARCA Re/Max Series. He is the younger brother of former NASCAR and ARCA driver Andy Belmont.

== Racing career ==
In 2000, Belmont made his debut in the ARCA Bondo/Mar-Hyde Series, driving the No. 1 Ford for brother Andy at Winchester Speedway, where he finished 25th after starting 32nd and last. He then entered in the following race at the Illinois State Fairgrounds dirt track, but would ultimately fail to qualify.

In 2001, Belmont ran every race besides the season opening race at Daytona International Speedway, driving a combination of entries from Andy Belmont Racing, Joe Cooksey, and ML Motorsports. He went on to finish eleventh in the final points standings with a best finish of tenth at Memphis Motorsports Park, driving for ABR. It was also during this year that Belmont served as a crew chief for Andy in the No. 1 Ford, thus resulting in most of his entries being start-and-park entries where he ran in an ABR back-up car; he only had five finishes where he was running at the end of the race. In 2002, Belmont left ABR to run the full schedule with James Hylton Motorsports, driving the No. 48 Ford. Across the year, he finished in the top-ten four times with a best finish of seventh at Springfield, and once again finished eleventh in the final points standings. In the following year, he only ran to races, driving the No. 38 Pontiac for ABR at Atlanta Motor Speedway, where he finished 28th due to a crash caused by a broken rear end while running twelfth, and for Mark Mancinelli at Lowe's Motor Speedway, where he finished eighteenth.

After not making any starts for the next five year, Belmont made a return to the series in 2009 at Kentucky Speedway, driving the No. 14 Ford for ABR, where he finished three laps down in 22nd after starting 28th. He then finished 30th at the next race at Toledo Speedway, where he was the last car running on track. Belmont then finished 21st in the next two races at Pocono Raceway and Michigan Speedway, before finishing sixteenth at Mansfield Motorsports Park despite starting 29th. The Mansfield race would be his final race that year, as he was replaced by Kory Rabenold for the remainder of the year, as well as his last race as a driver, as he has not competed since.

After his driving career ended, Belmont has recently worked as a spotter for Mullins Racing.

== Personal life ==
Belmont is the uncle of Andrew and Kyle Belmont, who have also competed in ARCA competition.

== Motorsports results ==
=== ARCA Re/Max Series ===
(key) (Bold – Pole position awarded by qualifying time. Italics – Pole position earned by points standings or practice time. * – Most laps led.)

ARCA Re/Max Series results
Year	Team	No.	Make	1	2	3	4	5	6	7	8	9	10	11	12	13	14	15	16	17	18	19	20	21	22	23	24	25	ARMC	Pts	Ref
2000	Andy Belmont Racing	1	Ford	DAY	SLM	AND	CLT	KIL	FRS	MCH	POC	TOL	KEN	BLN	POC	WIN; 25	ISF; DNQ	KEN	DSF	SLM	CLT	TAL	ATL						111th	130	
2001	Andy Belmont Racing	50	Ford	DAY	NSH; 36	WIN; 26																							11th	3160	
2001	Andy Belmont Racing	7	Ford				SLM; 28	GTY; 31	KEN; 36																				11th	3160	
2001	Joe Cooksey	51	Ford							CLT; 34						KEN; 32	MCH; 26				CHI; 34		SLM; 27			CLT; 39	TAL; 22	ATL; 14	11th	3160	
2001	Andy Belmont Racing	51	Ford								KAN; 28	MCH; 36	POC; 35		GLN; 27			POC; 15											11th	3160	
2001	Andy Belmont Racing	4	Ford											MEM; 10															11th	3160	
2001	Joe Cooksey	51	Chevy																NSH; 19										11th	3160	
2001	Joe Cooksey	16	Ford																	ISF; 24		DSF; 34							11th	3160	
2001	ML Motorsports	51	Pontiac																					TOL; 29	BLN; 30				11th	3160	
2002	James Hylton Motorsports	48	Ford	DAY; 35	ATL; 24	NSH; 25	SLM; 14	KEN; 17	CLT; 25	KAN; 9	POC; 11	MCH; 21	TOL; 27	SBO; 11	KEN; 19	BLN; 17	POC; 18	NSH; 9	ISF; 7	WIN; 29	DSF; 9	CHI; 33	SLM; 19	TAL; 19	CLT; 20				11th	4225	
2003	Andy Belmont Racing	38	Pontiac	DAY	ATL; 28	NSH	SLM	TOL	KEN																				112th	230	
2003	Mark Mancinelli	38	Pontiac							CLT; 18	BLN	KAN	MCH	LER	POC	POC	NSH	ISF	WIN	DSF	CHI	SLM	TAL	CLT	SBO				112th	230	
2009	Andy Belmont Racing	14	Ford	DAY	SLM	CAR	TAL	KEN; 22	TOL; 30	POC; 21	MCH; 21	MFD; 16	IOW	KEN	BLN	POC	ISF	CHI	TOL	DSF	NJE	SLM	KAN	CAR					48th	600	
