= Larry Meadors =

American racing driver

- Born: October 10, 1953 (age 73); Louisville, Kentucky, U.S.

ARCA Menards Series career
- 15 races run over 2 years
- Best finish: 52nd (2010)
- First race: 2009 Kentuckiana Ford Dealers 200 by Federated Car Care (Salem)
- Last race: 2010 Kentuckiana Ford Dealers ARCA Fall Classic (Salem)
Wins	Top tens	Poles
0	0	0
- Statistics up to date as of January 14, 2025.

Larry Meadors (born October 10, 1953) is an American former professional stock car racing driver who has competed in the ARCA Racing Series from 2009 to 2010.

Meadors has also previously competed in series such as the ASA National Tour, the ASA CRA Super Series, the NASCAR Southeast Series, and the ASA National Late Model Sportsman Series.

== Motorsports results ==
=== ARCA Racing Series ===
(key) (Bold – Pole position awarded by qualifying time. Italics – Pole position earned by points standings or practice time. * – Most laps led.)

ARCA Racing Series results
Year	Team	No.	Make	1	2	3	4	5	6	7	8	9	10	11	12	13	14	15	16	17	18	19	20	21	ARSC	Pts	Ref
2009	Kimmel Racing	68	Ford	DAY	SLM; 28	CAR	TAL	KEN	TOL	POC	MCH	MFD; 31	IOW; 36	KEN; 36	BLN; 33	POC	ISF		TOL; 30	DSF	NJE	SLM; 29	KAN	CAR	59th	530	
2009	Hixson Motorsports	28	Chevy															CHI; 39							59th	530	
2010	Kimmel Racing	68	Ford	DAY	PBE	SLM; 30	TEX	TAL; 42	TOL				MFD; 28								SLM; 29	KAN			52nd	435	
2010	Mark Gibson Racing	68	Chevy							POC; 36	MCH; 41	IOW													52nd	435	
2010	Mark Gibson Racing	9	Chevy											POC; 37	BLN	NJE	ISF	CHI	DSF	TOL					52nd	435	
2010	Mark Gibson Racing	68	Dodge																				CAR; DNQ		52nd	435	
