= Jerick Johnson =

American racing driver (born 1980)

- Born: January 31, 1980 (age 46); Faribault, Minnesota, U.S.

NASCAR O'Reilly Auto Parts Series career
- 7 races run over 4 years
- 2008 position: 132nd
- Best finish: 112th (2007)
- First race: 2006 AT&T 250 (Milwaukee)
- Last race: 2008 Camping World RV Rental 250 (Milwaukee)
Wins	Top tens	Poles
0	0	0

NASCAR FedEx Freight Truck Series career
- 3 races run over 1 year
- 2010 position: 80th
- Best finish: 80th (2010)
- First race: 2010 O'Reilly 200 (Bristol)
- Last race: 2010 Mountain Dew 250 (Talladega)
Wins	Top tens	Poles
0	0	0

Jerick Johnson (born January 31, 1980) is an American professional stock car racing driver. He has made starts in the NASCAR O'Reilly Auto Parts Series, Truck Series, ARCA Menards Series, and the East and West Series. He competed in all of these series between 2003 and 2011.

== Racing career ==
Johnson did not race in NASCAR or ARCA in 2009, instead competing in the ASA, where he won rookie of the year. In 2010, he and his No. 76 team returned to racing stock cars and announced they would compete in ten ARCA races with sponsorship from the American Legion and David Law Firm. This was Johnson's first time running ARCA since 2006. They ended up expanding their schedule to 14 races, and finished 18th in points with one top-ten finish which came at Toledo. Johnson was the highest-finishing part-time driver in the standings in 2010, excluding Steve Arpin (who had to miss two ARCA races to drive for JR Motorsports in the Nationwide Series), Chad McCumbee (who started the season late in his full-time ride), and Rob Jones (who skipped the Daytona season-opener only).

== Personal life ==
In many races during his NASCAR and ARCA career, Johnson's sponsor was the American Legion, which gave Johnson's the nickname of "the freedom car."

== Motorsports career results ==
=== NASCAR ===
(key) (Bold – Pole position awarded by qualifying time. Italics – Pole position earned by points standings or practice time. * – Most laps led.)

==== Nationwide Series ====
NASCAR Nationwide Series results
Year	Team	No.	Make	1	2	3	4	5	6	7	8	9	10	11	12	13	14	15	16	17	18	19	20	21	22	23	24	25	26	27	28	29	30	31	32	33	34	35	NNSC	Pts	Ref
2005	Team Johnson Motorsports	76	Dodge	DAY	CAL	MXC	LVS	ATL	NSH	BRI	TEX	PHO	TAL	DAR	RCH	CLT	DOV	NSH	KEN	MLW	DAY	CHI	NHA	PPR	GTY	IRP	GLN	MCH	BRI	CAL	RCH	DOV; DNQ	KAN	CLT	MEM	TEX	PHO	HOM	N/A	0	
2006	Team Johnson Motorsports	76	Chevy	DAY	CAL	MXC	LVS	ATL	BRI	TEX	NSH	PHO	TAL	RCH	DAR	CLT	DOV	NSH	KEN	MLW; 37	DAY	CHI	NHA	MAR	GTY	IRP	GLN	MCH	BRI	CAL	RCH	DOV	KAN	CLT	MEM	TEX	PHO	HOM	153rd	N/A	
2007	Team Johnson Motorsports	76	Chevy	DAY	CAL	MXC	LVS	ATL	BRI	NSH; 41	TEX	PHO; Wth	TAL	RCH	DAR	CLT	DOV; 41	NSH	KEN; DNQ	MLW; 41	NHA	DAY	CHI	GTY; 41	IRP	CGV; 42	GLN	MCH	BRI	CAL	RCH	DOV	KAN	CLT	MEM	TEX	PHO	HOM	112th	157	
2008	Beahr Racing Enterprises	57	Dodge	DAY	CAL	LVS	ATL	BRI	NSH; DNQ	TEX	PHO	MXC	TAL	RCH	DAR	CLT	DOV	NSH	KEN																				132nd	58	
2008	Jay Robinson Racing	4	Chevy																	MLW; 35	NHA	DAY	CHI	GTY	IRP	CGV	GLN	MCH	BRI	CAL	RCH	DOV	KAN	CLT	MEM	TEX	PHO	HOM	132nd	58	

==== Camping World Truck Series ====
NASCAR Camping World Truck Series results
Year	Team	No.	Make	1	2	3	4	5	6	7	8	9	10	11	12	13	14	15	16	17	18	19	20	21	22	23	24	25	NCWTC	Pts	Ref
2010	Daisy Ramirez Motorsports	00	Chevy	DAY	ATL	MAR	NSH	KAN	DOV	CLT	TEX	MCH	IOW	GTY	IRP	POC; DNQ	NSH	DAR											80th	167	
2010	Daisy Ramirez Motorsports	01	Chevy																BRI; 27	CHI; 26	KEN	NHA	LVS	MAR					80th	167	
2010	Lafferty Motorsports	24	Chevy																						TAL; 35	TEX	PHO	HOM	80th	167	

==== K&N Pro Series East ====
NASCAR K&N Pro Series East results
Year	Team	No.	Make	1	2	3	4	5	6	7	8	9	10	11	12	13	NKNPSEC	Pts	Ref
2006	Team Johnson Motorsports	76	Chevy	GRE	STA	HOL	TMP	ERI	NHA	ADI	WFD	NHA; 32	DOV	LRP			68th	67	
2007	Team Johnson Motorsports	76	Chevy	GRE	ELK; DNQ	IOW; DNQ	SBO	STA	NHA	TMP	NSH	ADI	LRP	MFD	NHA	DOV	N/A	0	
2011	Team Johnson Motorsports	76	Chevy	GRE; 32	SBO	RCH; 37	IOW	BGS	JFC	LGY	NHA	COL	GRE	NHA	DOV		56th	119	

==== West Series ====
NASCAR West Series results
Year	Team	No.	Make	1	2	3	4	5	6	7	8	9	10	11	12	13	NWSC	Pts	Ref
2006	Team Johnson Motorsports	76	Chevy	PHO	PHO	S99	IRW	SON	DCS	IRW	EVG	S99	CAL; 30	CTS	AMP		76th	73	
2007	Team Johnson Motorsports	76	Chevy	CTS	PHO	AMP	ELK; DNQ	IOW; DNQ	CNS	SON	DCS	IRW	MMP	EVG	CSR	AMP	N/A	0	

=== ARCA Racing Series ===
(key) (Bold – Pole position awarded by qualifying time. Italics – Pole position earned by points standings or practice time. * – Most laps led.)

ARCA Racing Series results
Year	Team	No.	Make	1	2	3	4	5	6	7	8	9	10	11	12	13	14	15	16	17	18	19	20	21	22	23	ARSC	Pts	Ref
2003	Capital City Motorsports	32	Pontiac	DAY	ATL	NSH	SLM	TOL	KEN	CLT; DNQ	BLN																110th	235	
2003	Capital City Motorsports	38	Pontiac														NSH; 32	ISF	WIN	DSF	CHI	SLM	TAL	CLT	SBO		110th	235	
2003	Bob Schacht Motorsports	75	Pontiac									KAN; 18	MCH	LER	POC	POC											110th	235	
2006	Team Johnson Motorsports	76	Chevy	DAY	NSH; DNQ	SLM	WIN	KEN	TOL	POC	MCH	KAN; 34	KEN	BLN	POC	GTW	NSH	MCH	ISF	MIL	TOL	DSF	CHI	SLM	TAL	IOW; DNQ	141st	110	
2010	Team Johnson Motorsports	76	Chevy	DAY; DNQ	PBE	SLM; 22	TEX; 15	TAL; 16	TOL; 9	POC; 30	MCH; 21	IOW; 20	MFD; 20	POC; 26	BLN	NJE	ISF	CHI; 19	DSF	TOL; 20	SLM; 19	KAN; 16	CAR; 27				18th	2100	

=== CARS Super Late Model Tour ===
(key)

CARS Super Late Model Tour results
Year	Team	No.	Make	1	2	3	4	5	6	7	8	9	CSLMTC	Pts	Ref
2018	Team Johnson Motorsports	76	Chevy	MYB	NSH	ROU	HCY	BRI	AND	HCY; DNQ	ROU	SBO	52nd	2	
