= Nick Igdalsky =

American racing driver

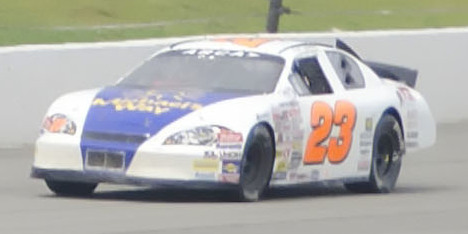
- Igdalsky's No. 23 ARCA car at Pocono Raceway in 2011
- Born: Nick Igdalsky; September 7, 1977 (age 49); Pocono Summit, Pennsylvania, U.S.

ARCA Menards Series career
- 33 races run over 8 years
- Best finish: 13th (2010)
- First race: 2009 South Jersey Building Trades 150 (Milville)
- Last race: 2021 General Tire#AnywhereIsPossible 200 (Pocono)
Wins	Top tens	Poles
0	1	0
- Statistics up to date as of June 8, 2023.

Nick Igdalsky (born September 7, 1977) is an American professional stock car racing driver who last competed part-time in the ARCA Menards Series driving the No. 12 Toyota for Fast Track Racing. He currently serves as the senior vice president and CEO of both Pocono Raceway and South Boston Speedway.

== Racing career ==
Igdalsky started racing at the age of sixteen, participating in the Bertil Roos Racing School programs up to twice a year by the time he graduated from Elon University. From that point, he would compete in two SCCA races, winning in his first regional race and finishing second in his other start after starting last due to a suspension part braking during qualifying.

In 2009, Igdalsky would join the Grand-Am Road Racing series, racing alongside cousin Chase Mattioli. It was also during this year that he would make his debut in the ARCA Re/Max Series driving the No. 83 Ford for Andy Belmont Racing at New Jersey Motorsports Park, where he would finish 14th. In the following year, he would run the full schedule, splitting time between Belmont's team and Mark Gibson Racing on his way to finish 13th in the points standings. He would run five races in the No. 23 Chevrolet for Hixson Motorsports the following year, getting a best finish of 17th at Milville.

In 2013, Igdalsky would run both Pocono Raceway events for Universe Racing, finishing 26th in the first race due to a crash, and eleventh in the second race. He would run with the team for both Pocono races the following year, now renamed Fox Motorsports DRG, and would earn his first top-ten finish in the second Pocono race, finishing sixth. He would only run the August race with the team in 2015, finishing 11th.

After not running in the series through 2016 and 2019, it was announced that Igdalsky would run for Fast Track Racing in the No. 12 Toyota at the Daytona International Speedway road course, where he would finish one lap down in 14th. He would run with the team again at Pocono the following year, where he would finish 21st due to being involved in a crash with Bryan Dauzat.

== Personal life ==
Igdalsky is the grandson of Drs. Rose and Joseph Mattioli, the original owners of Pocono Raceway, and the cousin of former driver Chase Mattioli.

== Motorsports career results ==
=== ARCA Menards Series ===
(key) (Bold – Pole position awarded by qualifying time. Italics – Pole position earned by points standings or practice time. * – Most laps led.)

ARCA Menards Series results
Year	Team	No.	Make	1	2	3	4	5	6	7	8	9	10	11	12	13	14	15	16	17	18	19	20	21	AMSC	Pts	Ref
2009	Andy Belmont Racing	83	Ford	DAY	SLM	CAR	TAL	KEN	TOL	POC	MCH	MFD	IOW	KEN	BLN	POC	ISF	CHI	TOL	DSF	NJE; 14	SLM	KAN	CAR	122nd	160	
2010	Andy Belmont Racing	1	Ford	DAY; 20	PBE; 15	SLM; 17	TEX; 17																		13th	3725	
2010	Mark Gibson Racing	59	Dodge					TAL; 17																	13th	3725	
2010	Mark Gibson Racing	59	Chevy						TOL; 20																13th	3725	
2010	Andy Belmont Racing	14	Ford							POC; 17	MCH; 19	IOW; 17	MFD; 16	POC; 24	BLN; 18	NJE; 15	ISF; 18	CHI; 26	DSF; 20	TOL; 12	SLM; 18	KAN; 20	CAR; 29		13th	3725	
2011	Hixson Motorsports	23	Chevy	DAY; 34	TAL; 21	SLM	TOL	NJE; 17	CHI	POC; 19	MCH	WIN	BLN	IOW	IRP	POC; 19	ISF	MAD	DSF	SLM	KAN	TOL			37th	600	
2013	Universe Racing	86	Chevy	DAY	MOB	SLM	TAL	TOL	ELK	POC; 26	MCH	ROA	WIN	CHI	NJE	POC; 11	BLN	ISF	MAD	DSF	IOW	SLM	KEN	KAN	84th	275	
2014	Fox Motorsports DRG	86	Chevy	DAY	MOB	SLM	TAL	TOL	NJE	POC; 18	MCH	ELK	WIN	CHI	IRP	POC; 6	BLN	ISF	MAD	DSF	SLM	KEN	KAN		53rd	340	
2015	Fox Motorsports DRG	86	Chevy	DAY	MOB	NSH	SLM	TAL	TOL	NJE	POC	MCH	CHI	WIN	IOW	IRP	POC; 11	BLN	ISF	DSF	SLM	KEN	KAN		100th	175	
2020	Fast Track Racing	12	Toyota	DAY	PHO	TAL	POC	IRP	KEN	IOW	KAN	TOL	TOL	MCH	DAY; 14	GTW	L44	TOL	BRI	WIN	MEM	ISF	KAN		69th	30	
2021	Fast Track Racing	12	Toyota	DAY	PHO	TAL	KAN	TOL	CLT	MOH	POC; 21	ELK	BLN	IOW	WIN	GLN	MCH	ISF	MLW	DSF	BRI	SLM	KAN		105th	23	
