= Rodney Melvin =

American racing driver

- Born: March 29, 1974 (age 52); Benton, Illinois, U.S.

ARCA Menards Series career
- 4 races run over 2 years
- Best finish: 69th (2010)
- First race: 2010 Allen Crowe 100 (Springfield)
- Last race: 2011 Southern Illinois 100 (DuQuoin)
Wins	Top tens	Poles
0	0	0
- Statistics up to date as of January 22, 2025.

Rodney Melvin (born March 29, 1974) is an American professional stock car racing driver who has previously competed in the ARCA Racing Series from 2010 to 2012.

Melvin also competed in series such as the UMP DIRTcar Summer Nationals, the MARS Racing Series, the Northern Allstars Late Model Series, and the World of Outlaws Late Model Series.

== Motorsports results ==
=== ARCA Racing Series ===
(key) (Bold – Pole position awarded by qualifying time. Italics – Pole position earned by points standings or practice time. * – Most laps led.)

ARCA Racing Series results
Year	Team	No.	Make	1	2	3	4	5	6	7	8	9	10	11	12	13	14	15	16	17	18	19	20	ARSC	Pts	Ref
2010	McCreery Motorsports	57	Ford	DAY	PBE	SLM	TEX	TAL	TOL	POC	MCH	IOW	MFD	POC	BLN	NJE	ISF; 16	CHI	DSF; 14	TOL	SLM	KAN	CAR	69th	310	
2011	McCreery Motorsports	57	Ford	DAY	TAL	SLM	TOL	NJE	CHI	POC	MCH	WIN	BLN	IOW	IRP; DNQ	POC	ISF; 18	MAD	DSF; 16	SLM	KAN	TOL		71st	315	
2012	McCreery Motorsports	57	Ford	DAY	MOB	SLM	TAL	TOL	ELK	POC	MCH	WIN	NJE	IOW	CHI	IRP	POC	BLN	ISF; Wth	MAD	SLM	DSF	KAN	N/A	0	
