= Andrew Belmont =

American racing driver (born 1992)

- Born: December 2, 1992 (age 33); Penndel, Pennsylvania, U.S.

ARCA Menards Series career
- 8 races run over 3 years
- Best finish: 46th (2010)
- First race: 2009 Wolverine Power Systems 200 (Berlin)
- Last race: 2018 Lucas Oil 200 (Daytona)
Wins	Top tens	Poles
0	1	0
- Statistics up to date as of July 5, 2023.

Andrew Belmont (born December 2, 1992) is an American professional stock car racing driver who has previously competed in the ARCA Racing Series. He is the son of former driver Andy Belmont.

== Racing career ==
In 2007, Belmont would make four starts in the Allison Legacy Series, getting a best finish of 21st at Orange County Speedway.

In 2009, Belmont would make his ARCA Re/Max Series debut at the age of sixteen, driving the No. 83 Ford for the family owned Andy Belmont Racing at Berlin Raceway, where he would finished six laps down in nineteenth after starting 21st. He would make another start that year at the Illinois State Fairgrounds dirt track, where he would start 31st and finish seventeenth. For the following year, he would three races with the team in the No. 48 Ford in collaboration with James Hylton Motorsports, getting a best finish of nineteenth at Toledo Speedway. He would also make a start for Eddie Sharp Racing at Mansfield Motorsports Park in the No. 6 Toyota, where he would finish 26th after eleven laps due to engine issues, and another start for Venturini Motorsports at Berlin in the No. 15 Chevrolet, where he would be classified in 32nd after failing to take the start. After not making another start for seven years, Belmont would announce a return to the series in 2018 at Daytona International Speedway driving the No. 2 Ford for Mullins Racing in collaboration with Andy Belmont and Hixson Motorsports. He had previously participated in the pre-season test at the track with the team that January. After starting 37th, he would avoid numerous crashes late in the race to finish in ninth place.

Belmont last raced in the Bob Hilbert Sportswear Short Track Super Series Crate 602 Sportsman Tour, finishing 26th at Georgetown Speedway.

== Personal life ==
Belmont has a brother named Kyle, who has also raced in ARCA and currently works as a tire specialist and interior fabricator for Team Penske in the NASCAR Cup Series.

== Motorsports results ==
=== ARCA Racing Series ===
(key) (Bold – Pole position awarded by qualifying time. Italics – Pole position earned by points standings or practice time. * – Most laps led.)

ARCA Racing Series results
Year	Team	No.	Make	1	2	3	4	5	6	7	8	9	10	11	12	13	14	15	16	17	18	19	20	21	ARSC	Pts	Ref
2009	Andy Belmont Racing	83	Ford	DAY	SLM	CAR	TAL	KEN	TOL	POC	MCH	MFD	IOW	KEN	BLN; 19	POC	ISF; 17	CHI	TOL	DSF	NJE	SLM	KAN	CAR	81st	280	
2010	Andy Belmont Racing	48	Ford	DAY	PBE; 26	SLM; 21	TEX	TAL	TOL; 19	POC	MCH	IOW													46th	485	
2010	Eddie Sharp Racing	6	Toyota										MFD; 26	POC											46th	485	
2010	Venturini Motorsports	15	Chevy												BLN; 32	NJE	ISF	CHI	DSF	TOL	SLM	KAN	CAR		46th	485	
2018	Mullins Racing	2	Ford	DAY; 9	NSH	SLM	TAL	TOL	CLT	POC	MCH	MAD	GTW	CHI	IOW	ELK	POC	ISF	BLN	DSF	SLM	IRP	KAN		79th	185	
