= Brent Cross (racing driver) =

American racing driver

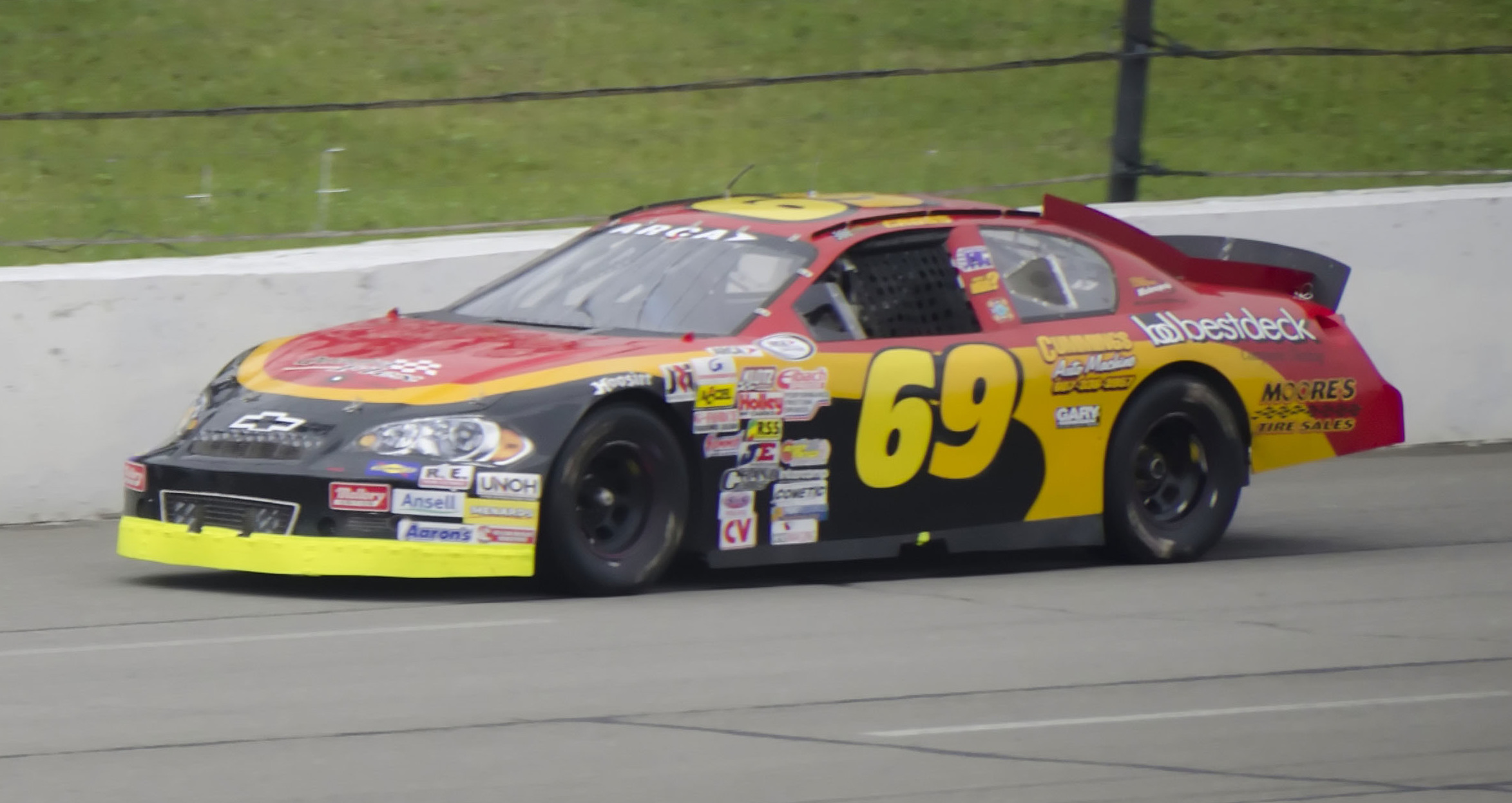
- Cross' No. 69 car at Pocono Raceway in 2011
- Born: December 13, 1960 (age 65); Cortland, New York, U.S.

ARCA Menards Series career
- 19 races run over 11 years
- Best finish: 47th (2014)
- First race: 2004 ARCA Re/Max 200 by Hamot/Siemens, Giant Eagle & Pork (Lake Erie)
- Last race: 2014 SuperChevyStores.com 100 (Springfield)
Wins	Top tens	Poles
0	0	0
- Statistics up to date as of January 19, 2025.

Brent Cross (born December 13, 1960) is an American professional stock car racing driver who has competed in the ARCA Racing Series from 2004 to 2015.

Cross has also previously competed in series such as the NASCAR Busch East Series, the Super Cup Stock Car Series, and the World Series of Asphalt Stock Car Racing.

== Motorsports results ==
=== NASCAR ===
(key) (Bold – Pole position awarded by qualifying time. Italics – Pole position earned by points standings or practice time. * – Most laps led.)

==== Busch East Series ====
NASCAR Busch East Series results
Year	Team	No.	Make	1	2	3	4	5	6	7	8	9	10	11	NBESC	Pts	Ref
2006	LaCross Motorsports	97	Chevy	GRE; 29	STA	HOL; 23	TMP; 26	ERI; 16	NHA; 34	ADI; 17	WFD; 22	NHA; 33	DOV	LRP	23rd	704	

=== ARCA Racing Series ===
(key) (Bold – Pole position awarded by qualifying time. Italics – Pole position earned by points standings or practice time. * – Most laps led.)

ARCA Racing Series results
Year	Team	No.	Make	1	2	3	4	5	6	7	8	9	10	11	12	13	14	15	16	17	18	19	20	21	22	23	ARSC	Pts	Ref
2004	LaCross Motorsports	47	Pontiac	DAY	NSH	SLM	KEN	TOL	CLT	KAN	POC	MCH	SBO	BLN	KEN	GTW	POC	LER; 22	NSH	ISF	TOL	DSF	CHI	SLM; DNQ	TAL		136th	145	
2005	LaCross Motorsports	47	Pontiac	DAY	NSH	SLM	KEN	TOL	LAN	MIL	POC; 30	MCH	KAN	KEN	BLN	POC	GTW	LER; 23	NSH	MCH	ISF	TOL	DSF	CHI	SLM	TAL	107th	195	
2007	LaCross Motorsports	7	Chevy	DAY	USA	NSH	SLM	KAN	WIN	KEN	TOL	IOW	POC; 23	MCH	BLN	KEN	POC; 24	NSH	ISF	MIL	GTW	DSF	CHI	SLM	TAL	TOL	96th	225	
2008	LaCross Motorsports	28	Chevy	DAY; DNQ	SLM	IOW	KAN	CAR	KEN	TOL	POC	MCH	CAY	KEN	BLN												151st	55	
2008	LaCross Motorsports	59	Chevy													POC; 40	NSH	ISF	DSF	CHI	SLM	NJE	TAL	TOL			151st	55	
2009	LaCross Motorsports	28	Chevy	DAY	SLM	CAR	TAL	KEN	TOL	POC; 23	MCH	MFD	IOW	KEN	BLN	POC	ISF	CHI	TOL	DSF	NJE	SLM	KAN	CAR			135th	115	
2010	LaCross Motorsports	28	Chevy	DAY	PBE	SLM	TEX	TAL; 24	TOL	POC	MCH	IOW	MFD														86th	195	
2010	LaCross Motorsports	68	Chevy											POC; 29	BLN	NJE	ISF	CHI	DSF	TOL	SLM	KAN	CAR				86th	195	
2011	LaCross Motorsports	7	Chevy	DAY; 26	TAL	SLM	TOL	NJE	CHI																		67th	340	
2011	LaCross Motorsports	69	Chevy							POC; 23	MCH	WIN	BLN	IOW	IRP	POC; 21	ISF	MAD	DSF	SLM	KAN	TOL					67th	340	
2012	LaCross Motorsports	7	Chevy	DAY; Wth	MOB	SLM	TAL	TOL	ELK	POC; 30	MCH	WIN	NJE	IOW	CHI	IRP	POC; 35	BLN	ISF	MAD	SLM	DSF	KAN				117th	130	
2013	LaCross Motorsports	7	Chevy	DAY; DNQ	MOB	SLM	TAL	TOL	ELK	POC; 20	MCH	ROA	WIN	CHI	NJM	POC; 25	BLN	ISF	MAD	DSF	IOW	SLM	KEN	KAN			87th	260	
2014	LaCross Motorsports	58	Chevy	DAY; DNQ	MOB	SLM																					47th	375	
2014	LaCross Motorsports	03	Chevy				TAL; 33	TOL	NJE																		47th	375	
2014	LaCross Motorsports	7	Chevy							POC; 25	MCH	ELK	WIN	CHI	IRP	POC; 29	BLN	ISF; 27	MAD	DSF	SLM	KEN	KAN				47th	375	
2015	LaCross Motorsports	99	Chevy	DAY; DNQ	MOB	NSH	SLM	TAL	TOL	NJE	POC	MCH	CHI	WIN	IOW	IRP	POC	BLN	ISF	DSF	SLM	KEN	KAN				141st	25	
