= Chad Frewaldt =

American racing driver (born 1970)

- Born: July 8, 1970 (age 56); Kansas City, Kansas, U.S.

NASCAR FedEx Freight Truck Series career
- 1 race run over 1 year
- Best finish: N/A (2013)
- First race: 2013 Lucas Oil 150 (Phoenix)
Wins	Top tens	Poles
0	0	0

ARCA Menards Series career
- 3 races run over 3 years
- Best finish: 119th (2012)
- First race: 2010 Kansas Lottery 150 (Kansas)
- Last race: 2012 Akona 200 Presented by Federated Car Care (Elko)
Wins	Top tens	Poles
0	0	0
- Statistics up to date as of May 7, 2025.

Chad Frewaldt (born July 8, 1970) is an American former professional racing driver. He competed in the NASCAR Camping World Truck Series and ARCA Racing Series between 2010 and 2013.

== Racing career ==
Frewaldt's first known appearance in racing came in 2000, where he attempted to qualify for a modified race at I-35 Speedway. Frewaldt attempted to qualify for multiple dirt racing events in 2006, but failed to qualify. Frewaldt competed in late model racing in 2007. He continued competing in dirt and late model racing over the next few years. He would make his ARCA Racing Series debut in 2010, driving for Jennifer Jo Cobb at Kansas Speedway. Frewaldt would return for a race in 2011, driving for his own team at Kansas. He would make his third and final start in the series during the 2012 season, driving for Hixson Motorsports at Elko Speedway. Frewaldt would make his NASCAR Camping World Truck Series debut at Phoenix Raceway in 2013, driving for RSS Racing. He would be involved in an altercation with Bubba Wallace during practice after the two drivers made contact and crashed. Frewaldt was a post entry and was ineligible to score driver and owner points, and finished the race 29th after having electrical issues. In addition to his racing, Frewaldt was the crew chief for Mike Harmon Racing's truck team in 2014. Frewaldt won two midget races in 2017. He would win three more races in 2021. Frewaldt has remained active in various racing series, continuing to compete as recently as 2024.

== Motorsports career results ==
=== NASCAR ===
(key) (Bold – Pole position awarded by qualifying time. Italics – Pole position earned by points standings or practice time. * – Most laps led.)

==== Camping World Truck Series ====
NASCAR Camping World Truck Series results
Year	Team	No.	Make	1	2	3	4	5	6	7	8	9	10	11	12	13	14	15	16	17	18	19	20	21	22	NCWTC	Pts	Ref
2013	RSS Racing	38	Chevy	DAY	MAR	CAR	KAN	CLT	DOV	TEX	KEN	IOW	ELD	POC	MCH	BRI	MSP	IOW	CHI	LVS	TAL	MAR	TEX	PHO; 29	HOM	NA	0	

=== ARCA Racing Series ===
(key) (Bold – Pole position awarded by qualifying time. Italics – Pole position earned by points standings or practice time. * – Most laps led.)

ARCA Racing Series results
Year	Team	No.	Make	1	2	3	4	5	6	7	8	9	10	11	12	13	14	15	16	17	18	19	20	ARSC	Pts	Ref
2010	Jennifer Jo Cobb Racing	28	Chevy	DAY	PBE	SLM	TEX	TAL	TOL	POC	MCH	IOW	MFD	POC	BLN	NJE	ISF	CHI	DSF	TOL	SLM	KAN; 31	CAR	125th	75	
2011	Chad Frewaldt	98	Chevy	DAY	TAL	SLM	TOL	NJE	CHI	POC	MCH	WIN	BLN	IOW	IRP	POC	ISF	MAD	DSF	SLM	KAN; 21	TOL		131st	125	
2012	Hixson Motorsports	3	Chevy	DAY	MOB	SLM	TAL	TOL	ELK; 24	POC	MCH	WIN	NJE	IOW	CHI	IRP	POC	BLN	ISF	MAD	SLM	DSF	KAN	119th	110	
