= Mikey Kile =

American stock car racing driver

- Born: February 6, 1983 (age 43); Westlake, Louisiana, U.S.

NASCAR O'Reilly Auto Parts Series career
- 6 races run over 2 years
- Best finish: 41st (2011)
- First race: 2010 Nashville 300 (Nashville)
- Last race: 2011 U.S. Cellular 250 (Iowa)
Wins	Top tens	Poles
0	0	0

NASCAR FedEx Freight Truck Series career
- 6 races run over 1 year
- Best finish: 39th (2009)
- First race: 2009 Kroger 250 (Martinsville)
- Last race: 2009 WinStar World Casino 350K (Texas)
Wins	Top tens	Poles
0	0	0
- Statistics up to date as of September 21, 2013.

Mikey Kile (born February 6, 1983) is an American professional stock car racing and dirt track racing driver. He currently competes part-time in Dirt Super Late Models in the No. 25 Longhorn Chassis for his own team.

== Personal life ==
Kile was born in Westlake, Louisiana on February 6, 1983, and still resides there; he is a fourth-generation racing driver, with his father, grandfather, and great-grandfather all competing in various forms of motorsport. Kile graduated from Westlake High School in 2001, and is married, to Kasha, with one son.

== Career ==
Kile began his racing career at age eight, competing in kart racing events; he would win national championships in World Karting Association and International Kart Federation competition during his karting career. Kile moved to stock car competition in 2005, competing in the USAR Pro Cup Series and the NASCAR AutoZone Elite Division, Southeast Series; his best Pro Cup season came in 2008, winning his first race in the series at Salem Speedway as well as the Northern Division Rookie of the Year award.

Kile moved up to NASCAR and ARCA competition in 2009, competing for Brad Keselowski Racing on a limited basis; running for Venturini Motorsports in the ARCA Re/MAX Series in 2010, he finished fifth in points, scoring his first career win at Michigan International Speedway. He also made his first career start in the NASCAR-sanctioned Nationwide Series in 2010, at Nashville Superspeedway for Braun Racing.

Kile competed on a limited basis in the Nationwide Series for Turner Motorsports in 2011, scoring a best finish of fifteenth at Nashville Superspeedway in July; he planned to return to the team for a limited schedule in 2012, as well as running the full 2012 ARCA Racing Series schedule for Andy Belmont Racing.

== Motorsports career results ==
=== NASCAR ===
(key) (Bold – Pole position awarded by qualifying time. Italics – Pole position earned by points standings or practice time. * – Most laps led.)

==== Nationwide Series ====
NASCAR Nationwide Series results
Year	Team	No.	Make	1	2	3	4	5	6	7	8	9	10	11	12	13	14	15	16	17	18	19	20	21	22	23	24	25	26	27	28	29	30	31	32	33	34	35	NNSC	Pts	Ref
2010	Braun Racing	10	Toyota	DAY	CAL	LVS	BRI	NSH; 33	PHO	TEX	TAL	RCH	DAR	DOV	CLT	NSH	KEN	ROA	NHA	DAY	CHI	GTY	IRP	IOW	GLN	MCH	BRI	CGV	ATL	RCH	DOV	KAN	CAL	CLT	GTY	TEX	PHO	HOM	132nd	64	
2011	Turner Motorsports	30	Chevy	DAY	PHO	LVS	BRI	CAL	TEX	TAL	NSH; 29	RCH	DAR	DOV	IOW	CLT	CHI; 33	MCH	ROA	DAY	KEN	NHA; 16	NSH; 15	IRP	IOW; 19	GLN	CGV	BRI	ATL	RCH	CHI	DOV	KAN	CLT	TEX	PHO	HOM		41st	108	

==== Camping World Truck Series ====
NASCAR Camping World Truck Series results
Year	Team	No.	Make	1	2	3	4	5	6	7	8	9	10	11	12	13	14	15	16	17	18	19	20	21	22	23	24	25	NCWTC	Pts	Ref
2009	Brad Keselowski Racing	29	Chevy	DAY	CAL	ATL	MAR; 12	KAN	CLT	DOV	TEX	MCH	MLW; 11	MEM	KEN	IRP	NSH	BRI	CHI; 27	IOW	GTW; 11	NHA	LVS; 21	MAR	TAL	TEX; 16	PHO	HOM	39th	684	

=== ARCA Racing Series ===
(key) (Bold – Pole position awarded by qualifying time. Italics – Pole position earned by points standings or practice time. * – Most laps led.)

ARCA Racing Series results
Year	Team	No.	Make	1	2	3	4	5	6	7	8	9	10	11	12	13	14	15	16	17	18	19	20	21	ARSC	Pts	Ref
2009	K-Automotive Racing	29	Chevy	DAY; 27	SLM	CAR	TAL; 4	KEN; 25	TOL	POC; 8	MCH; 6	MFD	IOW	KEN; 30	BLN	POC; 15	ISF	CHI	TOL	DSF	NJE	SLM	KAN; 6	CAR	29th	1235	
2010	Venturini Motorsports	25	Toyota	DAY; 16	PBE; 7		TEX; 10	TAL; 5	TOL; 10	**POC**; 2*	MCH; 1	IOW; 30	MFD; 9	POC; 8	BLN; 7	NJE; 6		CHI; 25		TOL; 19	SLM; 4	**KAN**; 4*	CAR; 10		5th	4740	
2010	Venturini Motorsports	25	Chevy			SLM; 20											ISF; 2		DSF; 3						5th	4740	
2012	Andy Belmont Racing	1	Ford	DAY; 16	MOB; 4	SLM; 12	TAL; 22	TOL; 6	ELK	POC	MCH	WIN	NJE	IOW	CHI	IRP	POC	BLN	ISF	MAD	SLM	DSF	KAN		28th	1100	
