= 2010 ARCA Racing Series =

American motorsport season

Seasons
- ← 2009 2011 →

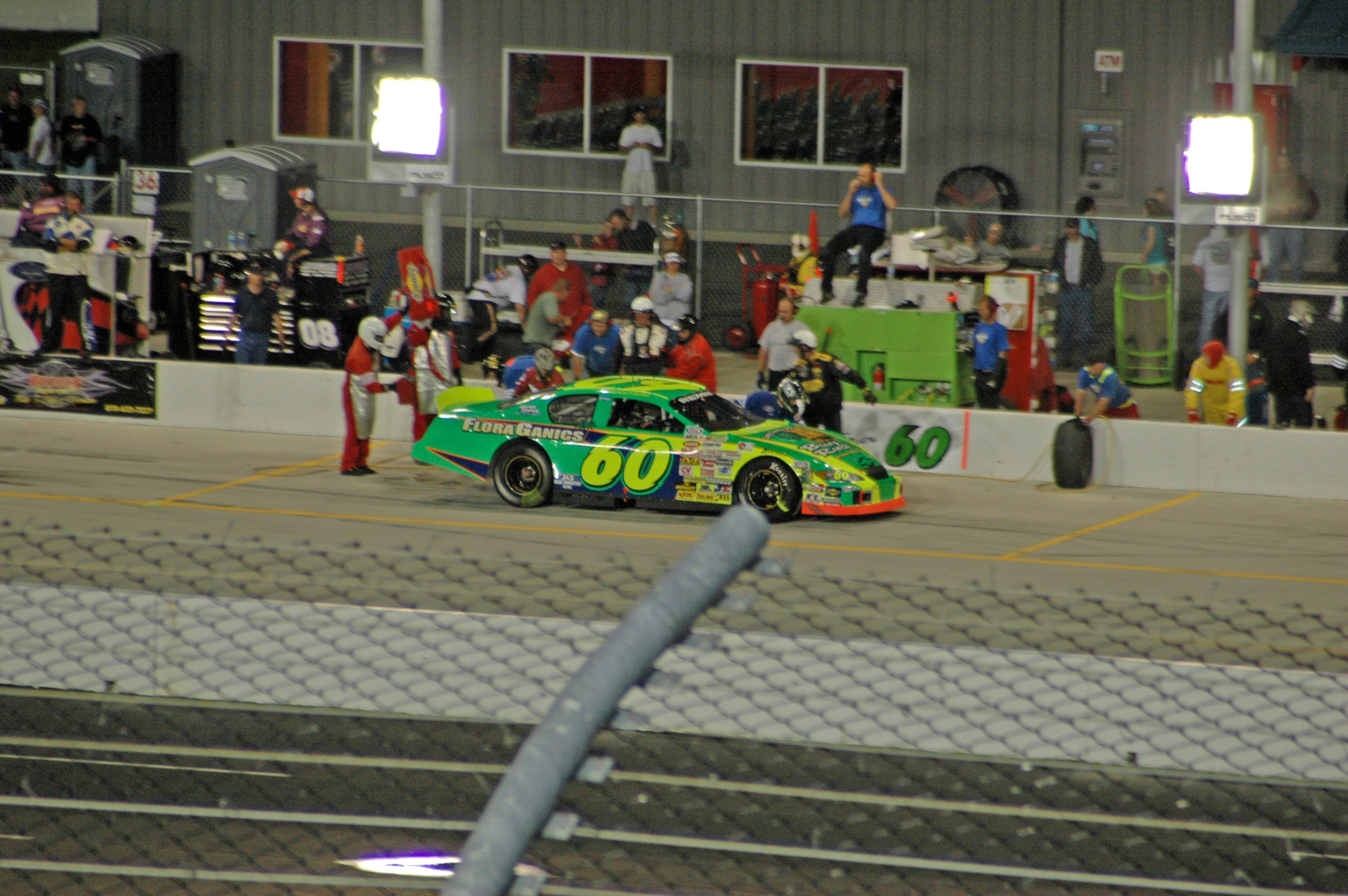
Patrick Sheltra, driving the No. 60 car for his self-owned team, won the 2010 series championship.

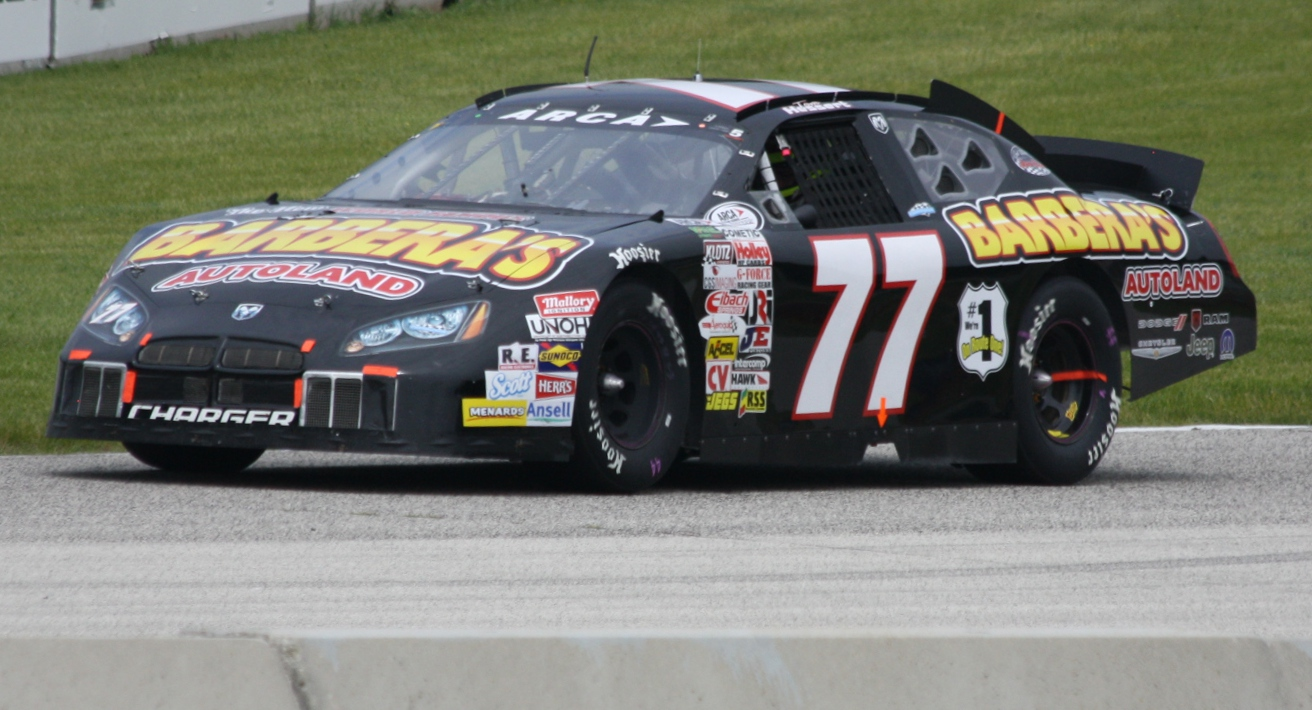
Tom Hessert III, driving the No. 77 car for Cunningham Motorsports, finished third in the championship.

The 2010 ARCA Racing Series presented by Re/MAX and Menards was the 58th season of the ARCA Racing Series. The season began on February 6 with the Lucas Oil Slick Mist 200 and ended on October 9 with the American 200 presented by Black's Tire and Auto Service. Patrick Sheltra, driving for his own team, Sheltra Motorsports, won the championship.

This season was notable for the season-opening race, the 2010 Lucas Oil Slick Mist 200 at Daytona, which had the largest audience of any ARCA event in the history of the series with 2.4 million viewers tuning in on the Speed Channel. The high viewership was because Danica Patrick was competing in the event, which was her first stock car start as part of her move from the IndyCar Series to NASCAR. This garnered a lot more media coverage for the ARCA Series and attention to the series as a whole by race fans starting that year.

== Teams and drivers ==
Note: If under "team", the owner's name is listed and in italics, that means the name of the race team that fielded the car is unknown.

=== Complete schedule ===
Manufacturer	Team	No.	Driver
Chevrolet	Coulter Motorsports	16	Joey Coulter
Chevrolet	Darrell Basham Racing	34	Darrell Basham
Chevrolet	Richard Childress Racing	31	Tim George Jr.
Dodge	Cunningham Motorsports	22	Dakoda Armstrong (R)
Dodge	Cunningham Motorsports	77	Tom Hessert III
Ford	Andy Belmont Racing	1	Nick Igdalsky (R) 4
Ford	Andy Belmont Racing	1	Chad McCumbee 16
Ford	Andy Belmont Racing	14	Chase Mattioli (R) 6
Ford	Andy Belmont Racing	14	Nick Igdalsky (R) 14
Ford	Brad Smith Motorsports	26	Brad Smith
Ford	Fast Track Racing	11	Bryan Silas
Ford	Kimmel Racing	44	Frank Kimmel
Ford	Wayne Peterson Racing	06	Barry Fitzgerald 3
Ford	Wayne Peterson Racing	06	Wayne Peterson 5
Ford	Wayne Peterson Racing	06	Tyler Miles 4
Ford	Wayne Peterson Racing	06	Dennis Strickland 2
Ford	Wayne Peterson Racing	06	Mike Senica 2
Ford	Wayne Peterson Racing	06	Mike Harmon 4
Toyota	Eddie Sharp Racing	81	Craig Goess
Chevrolet 9 Dodge 9 Ford 2	Fast Track Racing	10	Mike Holt 2
Chevrolet 9 Dodge 9 Ford 2	Fast Track Racing	10	Marc Easton 5
Chevrolet 9 Dodge 9 Ford 2	Fast Track Racing	10	Nur Ali 1
Chevrolet 9 Dodge 9 Ford 2	Fast Track Racing	10	Ed Pompa 3
Chevrolet 9 Dodge 9 Ford 2	Fast Track Racing	10	Rick Clifton 2
Chevrolet 9 Dodge 9 Ford 2	Fast Track Racing	10	A. J. Fike 2
Chevrolet 9 Dodge 9 Ford 2	Fast Track Racing	10	Richard Harriman 4
Chevrolet 9 Dodge 9 Ford 2	Fast Track Racing	10	Tyler Speer 1
Chevrolet 17 Ford 3	Hixson Motorsports	23	Frank Wilson Jr. 3
Chevrolet 17 Ford 3	Hixson Motorsports	23	Jeff Buice 2
Chevrolet 17 Ford 3	Hixson Motorsports	23	Ron Cox 4
Chevrolet 17 Ford 3	Hixson Motorsports	23	Rob Jones 4
Chevrolet 17 Ford 3	Hixson Motorsports	23	Brian Tyler 1
Chevrolet 17 Ford 3	Hixson Motorsports	23	Levi Youster 6
Chevrolet 13 Ford 5 Dodge 2	ACG Motorsports 2 Bull Racing 2 Hixson Motorsports 12; Team LaCross Motorsports 1 Universe Racing 2 Jennifer Jo Cobb Racing 1	28	Chris Cockrum 2
Chevrolet 13 Ford 5 Dodge 2	ACG Motorsports 2 Bull Racing 2 Hixson Motorsports 12; Team LaCross Motorsports 1 Universe Racing 2 Jennifer Jo Cobb Racing 1	28	Ed Bull 2
Chevrolet 13 Ford 5 Dodge 2	ACG Motorsports 2 Bull Racing 2 Hixson Motorsports 12; Team LaCross Motorsports 1 Universe Racing 2 Jennifer Jo Cobb Racing 1	28	Frankie Kimmel 1
Chevrolet 13 Ford 5 Dodge 2	ACG Motorsports 2 Bull Racing 2 Hixson Motorsports 12; Team LaCross Motorsports 1 Universe Racing 2 Jennifer Jo Cobb Racing 1	28	Greg Sarff 1
Chevrolet 13 Ford 5 Dodge 2	ACG Motorsports 2 Bull Racing 2 Hixson Motorsports 12; Team LaCross Motorsports 1 Universe Racing 2 Jennifer Jo Cobb Racing 1	28	Brent Cross 1
Chevrolet 13 Ford 5 Dodge 2	ACG Motorsports 2 Bull Racing 2 Hixson Motorsports 12; Team LaCross Motorsports 1 Universe Racing 2 Jennifer Jo Cobb Racing 1	28	Levi Youster 2
Chevrolet 13 Ford 5 Dodge 2	ACG Motorsports 2 Bull Racing 2 Hixson Motorsports 12; Team LaCross Motorsports 1 Universe Racing 2 Jennifer Jo Cobb Racing 1	28	Steve Fox 2
Chevrolet 13 Ford 5 Dodge 2	ACG Motorsports 2 Bull Racing 2 Hixson Motorsports 12; Team LaCross Motorsports 1 Universe Racing 2 Jennifer Jo Cobb Racing 1	28	Rob Jones 7
Chevrolet 13 Ford 5 Dodge 2	ACG Motorsports 2 Bull Racing 2 Hixson Motorsports 12; Team LaCross Motorsports 1 Universe Racing 2 Jennifer Jo Cobb Racing 1	28	Jeff Buice 1
Chevrolet 13 Ford 5 Dodge 2	ACG Motorsports 2 Bull Racing 2 Hixson Motorsports 12; Team LaCross Motorsports 1 Universe Racing 2 Jennifer Jo Cobb Racing 1	28	Chad Frewaldt 1
Chevrolet 18 Toyota 1 Dodge 1	Venturini Motorsports 18; Brett Hudson Motorsports 1 Richard Petty Driver Search 1	15	Alli Owens 9
Chevrolet 18 Toyota 1 Dodge 1	Venturini Motorsports 18; Brett Hudson Motorsports 1 Richard Petty Driver Search 1	15	A. J. Frank 1
Chevrolet 18 Toyota 1 Dodge 1	Venturini Motorsports 18; Brett Hudson Motorsports 1 Richard Petty Driver Search 1	15	Tom Berte 1
Chevrolet 18 Toyota 1 Dodge 1	Venturini Motorsports 18; Brett Hudson Motorsports 1 Richard Petty Driver Search 1	15	Tony Palumbo 1
Chevrolet 18 Toyota 1 Dodge 1	Venturini Motorsports 18; Brett Hudson Motorsports 1 Richard Petty Driver Search 1	15	Andrew Belmont 1
Chevrolet 18 Toyota 1 Dodge 1	Venturini Motorsports 18; Brett Hudson Motorsports 1 Richard Petty Driver Search 1	15	Kyle Martel 1
Chevrolet 18 Toyota 1 Dodge 1	Venturini Motorsports 18; Brett Hudson Motorsports 1 Richard Petty Driver Search 1	15	Dennis Strickland 2
Chevrolet 18 Toyota 1 Dodge 1	Venturini Motorsports 18; Brett Hudson Motorsports 1 Richard Petty Driver Search 1	15	Ryan Wilson 1
Dodge 15 Chevrolet 5	Allgaier Motorsports	36	Robb Brent
Dodge 15 Chevrolet 5	Mark Gibson Racing	59	Leilani Munter 2
Dodge 15 Chevrolet 5	Mark Gibson Racing	59	Hal Martin 1
Dodge 15 Chevrolet 5	Mark Gibson Racing	59	Mark Gibson 7
Dodge 15 Chevrolet 5	Mark Gibson Racing	59	Chad McCumbee 1
Dodge 15 Chevrolet 5	Mark Gibson Racing	59	Nick Igdalsky (R) 2
Dodge 15 Chevrolet 5	Mark Gibson Racing	59	Will Kimmel
Dodge 15 Chevrolet 5	Mark Gibson Racing	59	Timmy Hill 4
Dodge 15 Chevrolet 5	Mark Gibson Racing	59	Michael Sosebee 1
Dodge 10 Chevrolet 2 Toyota 9	Sheltra Motorsports	60	Patrick Sheltra
Dodge 2 Ford 18	James Hylton Motorsports	48	Jill George 1
Dodge 2 Ford 18	James Hylton Motorsports	48	Andrew Belmont 3
Dodge 2 Ford 18	James Hylton Motorsports	48	James Hylton 15
Dodge 2 Ford 18	James Hylton Motorsports	48	Ricky Byers 1
Dodge 1 Ford 2 Chevrolet 17	Wayne Peterson Racing	0	Butch Jarvis 2
Dodge 1 Ford 2 Chevrolet 17	Wayne Peterson Racing	0	Rob Jones 4
Dodge 1 Ford 2 Chevrolet 17	Wayne Peterson Racing	0	Wayne Peterson 9
Dodge 1 Ford 2 Chevrolet 17	Wayne Peterson Racing	0	Avery McCluskey 4
Dodge 1 Ford 2 Chevrolet 17	Wayne Peterson Racing	0	Mike Senica 1
Toyota 17 Chevrolet 3	Venturini Motorsports	25	Mikey Kile
Toyota Chevrolet	Venturini Motorsports	55	Steve Arpin 18
Toyota Chevrolet	Venturini Motorsports	55	Josh Richards 1
Toyota Chevrolet	Venturini Motorsports	55	Donny Lia 1
Toyota 9 Dodge 11	Win-Tron Racing	32	Justin Marks

=== Limited schedule ===
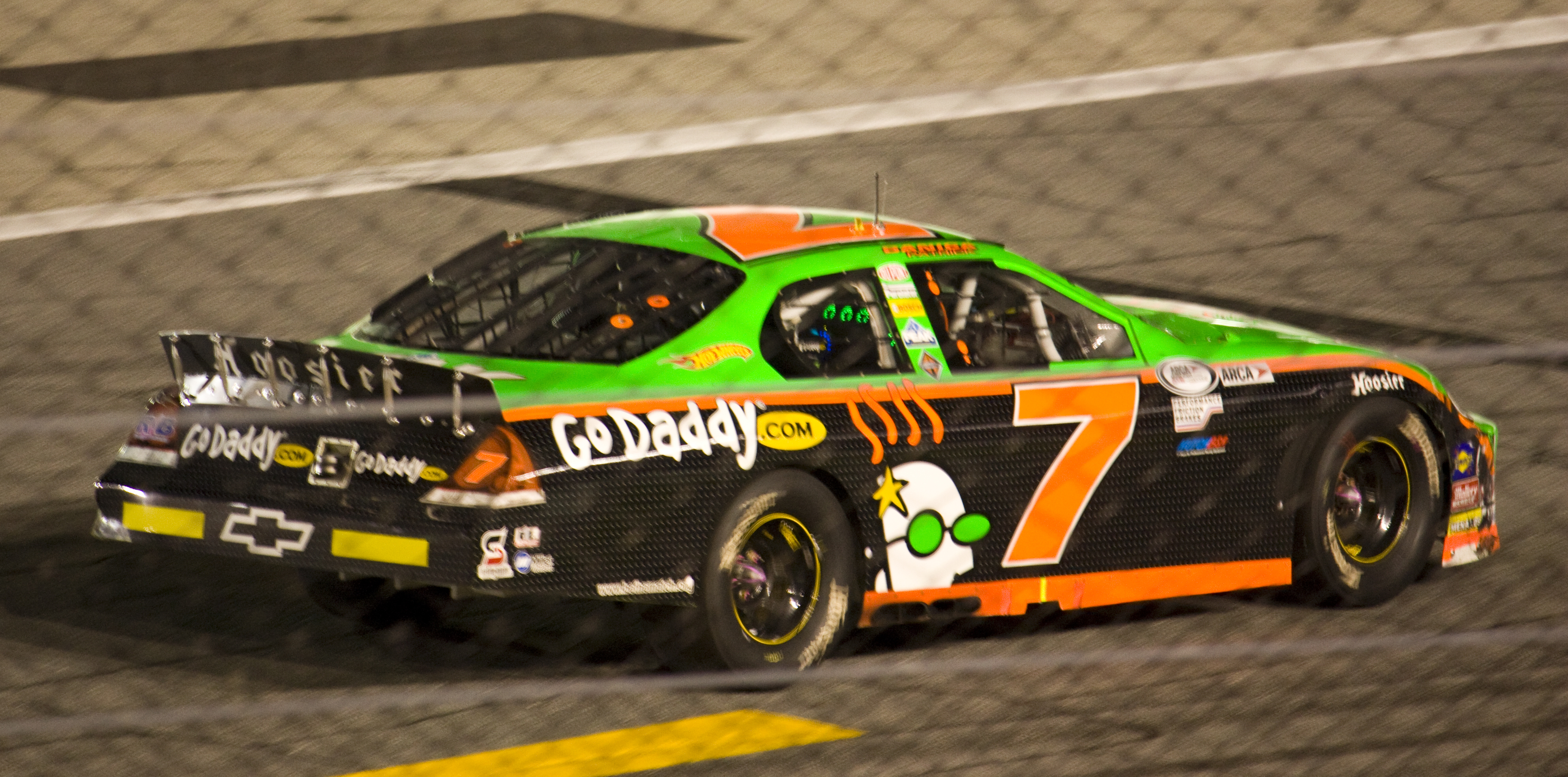
Danica Patrick made her stock car debut in the season-opener at Daytona with her Nationwide Series team JR Motorsports fielding a No. 7 car in the ARCA race in order for her to be approved to race in the Nationwide Series race at Daytona the next week.

Manufacturer	Team	No.	Driver	Rounds
Chevrolet	Beard Motorsports	42	Clay Rogers	1
Chevrolet	Bobby Gerhart Racing	5	Bobby Gerhart	8
Chevrolet	Bobby Gerhart Racing	5	Brandon Kidd	1
Chevrolet	Bobby Gerhart Racing	7	Clair Zimmerman	1
Chevrolet	Bill Martel Racing	43	Kyle Martel	5
Chevrolet	CGH Motorsports	58	Chad Hackenbracht	9
Chevrolet	D & B Motorsports	24	Brian Campbell	1
Chevrolet	D & B Motorsports	27	Michael Simko	2
Chevrolet	Darrell Basham Racing	94	Jason Basham	11
Chevrolet	Delaney Motorsports	88	Dustin Delaney	1
Chevrolet	DGM Racing	12	Russ Dugger	3
Chevrolet	Hendren Motorsports	66	Jesse Smith	1
Chevrolet	Hixson Motorsports (Note: It was a Hixson Motorsports entry using Bobby Gerhart Racing's owner points.)	7	Rob Jones	1
Chevrolet	Hixson Motorsports	29; 8; 13	Ron Cox	2
Chevrolet	Hixson Motorsports	29; 8; 13	Frank Wilson Jr.	1
Chevrolet	John Mackling	8	Kyle Logue	2
Chevrolet	JR Motorsports	7	Danica Patrick	1
Chevrolet	K Automotive Racing	29	Chad Finley	6
Chevrolet	K & K Racing	7	Justin Koch	1 (Note: It was a K & K Racing entry using Bobby Gerhart Racing's owner points.)
Chevrolet	K & K Racing	9	Justin Koch	1 (Note: It was a K & K Racing entry using Mark Gibson Racing's owner points.)
Chevrolet	Littleton Motorsports (Note: It was a Littleton Motorsports entry using Bobby Gerhart Racing's owner points.)	5	Mark Littleton	2
Chevrolet	Lafferty Motorsports	89	Ted Minor	1
Chevrolet	MacZink Racing	45	Jeffery MacZink	1
Chevrolet	Matt Lofton Motorsports	97	Matt Lofton	1
Chevrolet	RBR Enterprises	92	Brandon McReynolds	1
Chevrolet	Richard Childress Racing	41	Ty Dillon	3
Chevrolet	Rick Ware Racing	47	Timmy Hill	3
Chevrolet	Tori Racing	33	Curt Tori	2
Chevrolet	Vision Racing	7	Tanner Berryhill	2
Chevrolet	WestWorld Motorsports	02	Daryl Harr	1
Dodge	Allgaier Motorsports	63	Tim Andrews	1
Dodge	Brevak Racing	3	Brent Brevak	3
Dodge	Capital City Motorsports	38	Greg Sarff	1
Dodge	Capital City Motorsports	38	Alex Kennedy	2
Dodge	Jones Group Racing	29	Jesse Smith	1
Dodge	Jones Group Racing	30	Terry Jones	5
Dodge	Richard Petty Driver Search	41	Dillon Moltz	1
Dodge	Schenkel Racing	7	Kent Schenkel	2
Dodge	Team Gill Racing	85	Lance Fenton	1
Ford	7VN Motorsports	70	Tony Palumbo	3
Ford	Brad Smith Motorsports	2	Wayne Peterson	2
Ford	Brad Smith Motorsports	2	Mike Young	2
Ford	Brad Smith Motorsports	96	Mike Buckley	1
Ford	Cowen Racing	80	Tim Cowen	4
Ford	Empire Racing	83; 82	Sean Corr	6
Ford	Hover Motorsports	80	Brad Lloyd	1
Ford	James Hylton Motorsports	18	James Hylton	1
Ford	Josh Williams Racing	02	Josh Williams	5
Ford	K & K Racing	79	Brent Raulston	2
Ford	Martins Motorsports	95	Tommy Joe Martins	1
Ford	McCreerey Motorsports	57	Rodney Melvin	2
Ford	NDS Motorsports	53	Steve Park	1
Ford	RAB Racing	09	Grant Enfinger	7
Ford	RAB Racing	09	Spencer Maggard	1
Toyota	Eddie Sharp Racing	2	Pierre Bourque	1
Toyota	Eddie Sharp Racing	6	Nelson Piquet Jr.	3
Toyota	Eddie Sharp Racing	6	Blake Koch	1
Toyota	Eddie Sharp Racing	6	Brandon McReynolds	3
Toyota	Eddie Sharp Racing	6	Kyle Fowler	2
Toyota	Eddie Sharp Racing	6	Kory Rabenold	1
Toyota	Eddie Sharp Racing	6	Andrew Belmont	1
Toyota	Eddie Sharp Racing	6	Kyle Belmont	3
Toyota	Eddie Sharp Racing	6	Ray Mooi	1
Toyota	Eddie Sharp Racing	6	Kevin Swindell	1
Toyota	Gresham Motorsports	71	Max Gresham	5
Toyota	Stringer Motorsports	90	Milka Duno	1
Toyota	Venturini Motorsports	66	Mark Thompson	2
Toyota 2 Chevrolet 5	Venturini Motorsports	35	John Wes Townley	1
Toyota 2 Chevrolet 5	Venturini Motorsports	35	Tom Berte	3
Toyota 2 Chevrolet 5	Venturini Motorsports	35	Brett Hudson	1
Toyota 2 Chevrolet 5	Venturini Motorsports	35	Hal Martin	1
Chevrolet 3 Dodge 4	Fast Track Racing	18	Marc Easton	2
Chevrolet 3 Dodge 4	Fast Track Racing	18	Mike Holt	1
Chevrolet 3 Dodge 4	Fast Track Racing	18	Richard Harriman	3
Chevrolet 3 Dodge 4	Fast Track Racing	18	Chris Davis	1
Chevrolet 3 Dodge 4	Mark Gibson Racing	18	Michael Sosebee	1 (Note: It was a Mark Gibson Racing entry using Fast Track Racing's owner points.)
Chevrolet 3 Dodge 4	Mark Gibson Racing	9	Michael Sosebee	2
Chevrolet 3 Dodge 4	Mark Gibson Racing	9	Mark Gibson	1
Chevrolet 3 Dodge 4	Mark Gibson Racing	9	Larry Meadors	1
Chevrolet 3 Dodge 4	Mark Gibson Racing	9	Jeriod Prince	1
Chevrolet 1 Ford 4	Bowsher-Mooi Motorsports	21	Jennifer Jo Cobb	1
Chevrolet 1 Ford 4	Bowsher-Mooi Motorsports	21	Todd Bowsher	3
Chevrolet 1 Ford 4	Bowsher-Mooi Motorsports	21	Tom Graham	1
Chevrolet 6 Toyota 1	Ken Schrader Racing	52	Bill Baird	2
Chevrolet 6 Toyota 1	Ken Schrader Racing	52	Ken Schrader	2
Chevrolet 6 Toyota 1	Ken Schrader Racing	52	Kyle Fowler	3
Chevrolet 1 Ford 1	Ken Schrader Racing	99	Josh Richards	2 (Note: The team's entry at Michigan was fielded in a collaboration with RAB Racing.)
Chevrolet 2 Toyota 1 Ford 4	Bob Schacht Motorsports	75	Chuck Walker	1
Chevrolet 2 Toyota 1 Ford 4	Bob Schacht Motorsports	75	Benny Chastain	5
Chevrolet 2 Toyota 1 Ford 4	Bob Schacht Motorsports	75	Bob Schacht	1
Dodge 5 Ford 9 Chevrolet 5	Blackburn Motorsports 1 Kimmel Racing 13; Team LaCross Motorsports 1 Mark Gibson Racing 3	68; 88	Steve Blackburn	1
Dodge 5 Ford 9 Chevrolet 5	Blackburn Motorsports 1 Kimmel Racing 13; Team LaCross Motorsports 1 Mark Gibson Racing 3	68; 88	Will Kimmel	3
Dodge 5 Ford 9 Chevrolet 5	Blackburn Motorsports 1 Kimmel Racing 13; Team LaCross Motorsports 1 Mark Gibson Racing 3	68; 88	Larry Meadors	7
Dodge 5 Ford 9 Chevrolet 5	Blackburn Motorsports 1 Kimmel Racing 13; Team LaCross Motorsports 1 Mark Gibson Racing 3	68; 88	Matt Crafton	2
Dodge 5 Ford 9 Chevrolet 5	Blackburn Motorsports 1 Kimmel Racing 13; Team LaCross Motorsports 1 Mark Gibson Racing 3	68; 88	Brent Cross	1
Dodge 5 Ford 9 Chevrolet 5	Blackburn Motorsports 1 Kimmel Racing 13; Team LaCross Motorsports 1 Mark Gibson Racing 3	68; 88	Michael Sosebee	5
Dodge 5 Chevrolet 10	Team Johnson Motorsports	76	Jerick Johnson	15
Dodge 1 Ford 12 Chevrolet 2 Toyota 1	Mark Gibson Racing 1 Roulo Brothers Racing 12; Kelly Kovski Motorsports 2 Hattori Racing Enterprises 1	17	Hal Martin	1 (Note: It was a Mark Gibson Racing entry using Roulo Brothers Racing's owner points.)
Dodge 1 Ford 12 Chevrolet 2 Toyota 1	Mark Gibson Racing 1 Roulo Brothers Racing 12; Kelly Kovski Motorsports 2 Hattori Racing Enterprises 1	17	Billy Leslie	1
Dodge 1 Ford 12 Chevrolet 2 Toyota 1	Mark Gibson Racing 1 Roulo Brothers Racing 12; Kelly Kovski Motorsports 2 Hattori Racing Enterprises 1	17	Chris Buescher	8
Dodge 1 Ford 12 Chevrolet 2 Toyota 1	Mark Gibson Racing 1 Roulo Brothers Racing 12; Kelly Kovski Motorsports 2 Hattori Racing Enterprises 1	17	Chase Mattioli	3
Dodge 1 Ford 12 Chevrolet 2 Toyota 1	Mark Gibson Racing 1 Roulo Brothers Racing 12; Kelly Kovski Motorsports 2 Hattori Racing Enterprises 1	17	Kelly Kovski	2
Dodge 1 Ford 12 Chevrolet 2 Toyota 1	Mark Gibson Racing 1 Roulo Brothers Racing 12; Kelly Kovski Motorsports 2 Hattori Racing Enterprises 1	17	Miguel Paludo	1
Ford 2 Chevrolet 1	Spraker Racing Enterprises	42; 37	Scott Stenzel	2
Ford 2 Chevrolet 1	Spraker Racing Enterprises	42; 37	Joey Gase	1
Toyota 1 Chevrolet 2	Turner Motorsports	4	Ricky Carmichael	3
Toyota 2 Dodge 5 Chevrolet 1	Phoenix Racing	51	James Buescher	3
Toyota 2 Dodge 5 Chevrolet 1	Phoenix Racing	51	Casey Roderick	5

== Schedule ==
Rnd	Date	Event	Track	Type	Length	TV
1	February 6	Lucas Oil Slick Mist 200	Daytona International Speedway	Paved oval	200 miles (320 km)	SPEED
2	February 27	Tire Kingdom 150 presented by Modspace	Palm Beach International Raceway	Road course	150 miles (240 km)	
3	April 11	Kentuckiana Ford Dealers ARCA 200 presented by ApplianceZone.com	Salem Speedway	Paved oval	111 miles (179 km)	
4	April 16	Rattlesnake 150	Texas Motor Speedway	Paved oval	150 miles (240 km)	SPEED
5	April 23	Talladega ARCA 250	Talladega Superspeedway	Paved oval	250 miles (400 km)	SPEED
6	May 23	Menards 200 by Federated Car Care	Toledo Speedway	Paved oval	100 miles (160 km)	
7	June 5	Messina Wildlife Animal Stopper 200	Pocono Raceway	Paved oval	200 miles (320 km)	SPEED
8	June 11	Racing for Wildlife 200	Michigan International Speedway	Paved oval	200 miles (320 km)	SPEED
9	July 10	Prairie Meadows 200	Iowa Speedway	Paved oval	175 miles (282 km)	SPEED
10	July 17	Tim Richmond Memorial ARCA 200	Mansfield Motorsports Park	Paved oval	88 miles (142 km)	
11	July 31	Weis Markets 125	Pocono Raceway	Paved oval	125 miles (201 km)	SPEED
12	August 7	Berlin ARCA 200	Berlin Raceway	Paved oval	87.6 miles (141.0 km)	
13	August 15	Garden State ARCA 150 presented by the American Red Cross	New Jersey Motorsports Park	Road course	150 miles (240 km)	
14	August 22	Allen Crowe Memorial 100	Illinois State Fairgrounds Racetrack	Dirt oval	100 miles (160 km)	
15	August 27	Ansell Protective Gloves 150	Chicagoland Speedway	Paved oval	150 miles (240 km)	SPEED
16	September 6	Southern Illinois 100 presented by Federated Car Care	DuQuoin State Fairgrounds Racetrack	Dirt oval	100 miles (160 km)	
17	September 12	Northwest Ohio Ford Dealers 200	Toledo Speedway	Paved oval	100 miles (160 km)	
18	September 18	Kentuckiana Ford Dealers Fall Classic	Salem Speedway	Paved oval	111 miles (179 km)	
19	September 30	Kansas Lottery 150	Kansas Speedway	Paved oval	150 miles (240 km)	SPEED
20	October 9	American 200 presented by Black's Tire and Auto Service	Rockingham Speedway	Paved oval	203.4 miles (327.3 km)	SPEED

=== Changes ===
A second road course was added to the schedule with the February 27 race at Palm Beach International Raceway.

== Results and standings ==
=== Races ===
No.	Race	Pole position	Most laps led	Winning driver	Manufacturer	No.	Winning team
1	Lucas Oil Slick Mist 200	James Buescher	Bobby Gerhart	Bobby Gerhart	Chevrolet	5	Bobby Gerhart Racing
2	Tire Kingdom 150	Casey Roderick	Justin Marks	Justin Marks	Dodge	32	Win-Tron Racing
3	Kentuckiana Ford Dealers 200	Max Gresham	Steve Arpin	Steve Arpin	Chevrolet	55	Venturini Motorsports
4	Rattlesnake 150	Nelson Piquet Jr.	Justin Marks	Steve Arpin	Chevrolet	55	Venturini Motorsports
5	Talladega ARCA 250	Dakoda Armstrong	Grant Enfinger	Dakoda Armstrong	Dodge	22	Cunningham Motorsports
6	Menards 200	Chris Buescher	Chris Buescher	Chris Buescher	Ford	17	Roulo Brothers Racing
7	Messina Wildlife Animal Stopper 200	Mikey Kile	Mikey Kile	Craig Goess	Toyota	81	Eddie Sharp Racing
8	Racing for Wildlife 200	Craig Goess	Craig Goess	Mikey Kile	Toyota	25	Venturini Motorsports
9	Prairie Meadows 200	Ty Dillon	Tom Hessert III	Tom Hessert III	Dodge	77	Cunningham Motorsports
10	Tim Richmond Memorial ARCA 200	Chris Buescher	Max Gresham	Max Gresham	Toyota	71	Gresham Motorsports
11	Weis Markets 125	Frank Kimmel	Frank Kimmel	Robb Brent	Dodge	36	Allgaier Motorsports
12	Berlin ARCA 200	Brian Campbell	Frank Kimmel	Joey Coulter	Chevrolet	16	Coulter Motorsports
13	Garden State ARCA 150	Justin Marks	Justin Marks	Casey Roderick	Dodge	51	Phoenix Racing
14	Allen Crowe 100	Steve Arpin	Steve Arpin	Patrick Sheltra	Dodge	60	Sheltra Motorsports
15	Ansell Protective Gloves 150	Craig Goess	Patrick Sheltra	Patrick Sheltra	Dodge	60	Sheltra Motorsports
16	Southern Illinois 100	A. J. Fike	Steve Arpin	Steve Arpin	Chevrolet	55	Venturini Motorsports
17	Northwest Ohio Ford Dealers 200	Patrick Sheltra	Tom Hessert III	Chris Buescher	Ford	17	Roulo Brothers Racing
18	Kentuckiana Ford Dealers ARCA Fall Classic	Craig Goess	Dakoda Armstrong	Dakoda Armstrong	Dodge	22	Cunningham Motorsports
19	Kansas Lottery 150	Mikey Kile	Mikey Kile	Ty Dillon	Chevrolet	41	Richard Childress Racing
20	American 200	Kevin Swindell	Patrick Sheltra	Ty Dillon	Chevrolet	41	Richard Childress Racing

=== Drivers' championship ===
(key) Bold – Pole position awarded by time. Italics – Pole position set by final practice results or rainout. * – Most laps led.

Pos	Driver	DAY	PBR	SAL	TEX	TAL	TOL	POC	MIC	IOW	MAN	POC	BER	NJE	ILL	CHI	DUQ	TOL	SAL	KAN	ROC	Points
1	Patrick Sheltra	5	10	4	7	2	8	4	3	29	21	6	2	13	1	1*	4	3	6	5	4*	4965
2	Craig Goess	34	13	2	2	4	14	1	**6***	8	2	3	9	8	11	**5**	7	2	**13**	3	5	4945
3	Tom Hessert III	15	4	5	20	8	3	19	15	1*	8	4	4	5	3	7	2	7*	3	6	19	4860
4	Frank Kimmel	25	12	8	6	11	4	5	5	6	3	**7***	5*	4	12	4	15	21	9	7	6	4785
5	Mikey Kile	16	7	20	10	5	10	**2***	1	30	9	8	7	6	2	25	3	19	4	**4***	10	4740
6	Justin Marks	11	1*	3	4*	9	16	7	4	9	10	5	21	**20***	22	6	12	4	5	10	16	4710
7	Dakoda Armstrong	33	14	7	12	**1**	7	8	11	4	5	2	6	10	9	11	11	9	1*	11	11	4705
8	Joey Coulter	26	6	14	23	15	2	26	2	14	22	11	1	2	4	8	16	5	2	8	15	4535
9	Tim George Jr.	19	8	16	13	3	25	10	8	12	4	18	16	11	15	16	13	14	12	15	34	4215
10	Bryan Silas	9	16	11	8	18	27	28	9	13	11	9	22	12	14	10	10	11	7	24	23	4140
11	Robb Brent	13	2	24	5	35	13	6	10	23	14	1	11	19	8	24	22	6	10	27	26	4120
12	Steve Arpin	10	5	1*	1	14	23	11	33	28			3	9	**7**	2	1*	16	20	2	12	3735
13	Nick Igdalsky	20	15	17	17	17	20	17	19	17	16	24	18	15	18	26	20	12	18	20	29	3725
14	Darrell Basham	22	25	15	27	20	11	24	25	33	18	28	20	18	19	20	18	22	16	23	31	3425
15	Chad McCumbee				33	36	22	15	17	16	6	17	10	17	13	33	8	8	8	9	8	3280
16	Brad Smith	24	27	23	30	22	18	16	24	21	19	27	24	26	28	28	30	13	22	29	41	3145
17	Rob Jones		33	33	38	38	21	32	31	25	23	33	26	28	27	34	24	26	25	26	39	2310
18	Jerick Johnson	DNQ		22	15	16	9	30	21	20	20	26				19		20	19	16	27	2100
19	James Hylton		29		37	37	DC	21	30	36	24		25	27	25	21	28	18	24	32	28	1720
20	Chris Buescher			12			**1***			11	**7**			3				1	11		7	1625
21	Chase Mattioli	28	19	18	21	13	12	29	23			12										1445
22	Alli Owens	23	17	9	24	32		20	13						30	14						1410
23	Bobby Gerhart	1*				28		9	14	26		14				9				17		1260
24	Grant Enfinger	30			3	6*			35	3						3					9	1185
25	Jason Basham				31	39		23	32			25			10	31	17		14	28	40	1080
26	Timmy Hill			19						25			14	14				10	17		18	1055
27	Chad Finley				11			3	7							23				30	3	1010
28	Max Gresham			**6**						10	1*		13					23				940
29	Levi Youster						30			34	17		19				26	15	15		30	910
30	Chad Hackenbracht	40			26	21		25	20			13				27				25	37	900
31	Wayne Peterson		28	27		41	32	DNQ	DNQ	39	31	DNQ	33	35	35	39	34		32	DNQ		900
32	Tom Berte		24		29			14		24		21				18				21		855
33	Sean Corr	14			28	26		12	18			16										810
34	Michael Sosebee												29	32	34	35	33	28	28	DNQ	38	795
35	Kyle Fowler						15			22						12				14	17	750
36	Kyle Martel	DNQ				12		13				19		23		13						745
37	Will Kimmel		30							18		15			21		6					700
38	Ty Dillon									**2**										1	1	700
39	Casey Roderick		**21**							9				1		32				36		695
40	Ron Cox		31	10		19		DC				22			20*							655
41	Tim Cowen		9				17				15			22								605
42	Josh Williams		20				26			15				25							24	600
43	Mark Gibson			32				34	39	38	27				29	30	31					540
44	Richard Harriman													34	26	37	32	27	26	34		530
45	Brandon McReynolds			26		23						10									21	520
46	Andrew Belmont		26	21			19				26		32									485
47	Terry Jones	21		13		36	28		37													475
48	Marc Easton		32		35	40	31	33		35	25											455
49	James Buescher	**4**			18	30																450
50	Nelson Piquet Jr.	27			**9**				12													450
51	Todd Bowsher										12		15						28			450
52	Larry Meadors			30		42		36	41		28	37							29		DNQ	435
53	Frank Wilson Jr.	18			16				22						32							435
54	Ken Schrader						6										5					430
55	Matt Crafton						5			5												415
56	Hal Martin	35	11			10																410
57	Benny Chastain					34						30				38				22	25	405
58	Tony Palumbo								26		29					17					33	395
59	Kelly Kovski														6		9					390
60	Ricky Carmichael	7			25	31																375
61	Tyler Miles						29			32								25	23			375
62	Russ Dugger	38			14															12		370
63	Jeff Buice		22											23	24							345
64	Michael Simko								16				8									340
65	A. J. Fike														5		**25**					330
66	Chris Cockrum	12														15						325
67	Mark Thompson	2				25																325
68	Dennis Strickland								38				27					29	27			315
69	Rodney Melvin														16		14					310
70	Ed Pompa							18				32		31								285
71	Mark Littleton														17		21					270
72	Ed Bull		23											16								265
73	Mike Harmon											34				29				33	36	260
74	Kyle Louge														23		19					250
75	Kyle Belmont												28	30	31							245
76	Josh Richards	42							36		13											245
77	Kevin Swindell																				**2**	240
78	Jesse Smith	32																			13	235
79	Brent Brevak			28					29	37												220
80	Alex Kennedy				19	29																220
81	Blake Koch		3																			220
82	Scott Stenzel	DNQ				7																220
83	Kent Schenkal								27							22						215
84	John Wes Townley	3																				215
85	Danica Patrick	6																				200
86	Brent Cross					24						29										195
87	Steve Fox							22				31										195
88	Robert Mitten													7								195
89	Matt Lofton	DNQ																		13		190
90	Tommy Joe Martins	8																				190
91	Barry Fitzgerald	29			33			DNQ														175
92	Rick Clifton								28				30									175
93	Brandon Kidd												12									170
94	Avery McCluskey						DC				32				33		35	32				170
95	Mike Senica										30			33					31			170
96	Ryan Wilson																				14	160
97	Curt Tori							27				35										150
98	Mike Young												31					31				150
99	Bill Baird	36				27																145
100	Tanner Berryhill									40											22	145
101	Jennifer Jo Cobb	17																				145
102	Jeroid Prince																	17				145
103	Clair Zimmerman												17									145
104	Mike Holt	DNQ		31								38										140
105	Brett Hudson			DNQ													23					140
106	Spencer Maggard		18																			140
107	Miguel Paludo																			18		140
108	Daryl Harr																			19		135
109	Dillon Moltz											20										130
110	Dustin Delaney																				20	130
111	Bob Schacht		Wth											21								125
112	Nur Ali				22																	120
113	Brent Raulston																27		33			120
114	Brian Kaltreider											23										115
115	A. J. Frank						24															110
116	Tom Graham													24								110
117	Jeffery MacZink																	24				110
118	Ted Minor			25																		105
119	Joey Gase									27												95
120	Greg Sarff	DNQ			32																	95
121	Leilani Munter	39																		35		90
122	Frankie Kimmel			29																		85
123	Justin Koch																29		30			80
124	Pierre Bourque									31												75
125	Chad Frewaldt																			31		75
126	Jill George	31																				75
127	Brian Tyler							31														75
128	Tyler Speer																				32	70
129	Tim Andrews				34																	60
130	Clay Rogers								34													60
131	Butch Jarvis	41																			DNQ	55
132	Kory Rabenold							35														55
133	Steve Park																				35	55
134	Ricky Byers											36										50
135	Ray Mooi															36						50
136	Steve Blackburn	37																				45
137	Donny Lia											39										35
138	Mike Buckley								40		DC											30
139	Milka Duno	43																				30
	Brian Campbell												**23**									0
	Chris Davis																	30				0
	Lance Fenton	DNQ																				0
	Brad Lloyd	DNQ																				0
	Chuck Walker	DNQ																				0
	Donny Kelley	Wth																				0
	Amber Cope	Wth																				0
	Chris Lafferty	Wth																				0
	Dwight Laird											Wth										0

== See also ==
- 2010 NASCAR Sprint Cup Series
- 2010 NASCAR Nationwide Series
- 2010 NASCAR Camping World Truck Series
- 2010 NASCAR Whelen Modified Tour
- 2010 NASCAR Whelen Southern Modified Tour
- 2010 NASCAR Canadian Tire Series
- 2010 NASCAR Mini Stock Series
- 2010 NASCAR Corona Series
