= Michael Sosebee =

American racing driver

- Born: December 20, 1966 (age 59); Hoschton, Georgia, U.S.

ARCA Menards Series career
- 7 races run over 1 year
- Best finish: 34th (2010)
- First race: 2010 Berlin ARCA 200 (Berlin)
- Last race: 2010 American 200 Presented by Black's Tire & Auto Service (Rockingham)
Wins	Top tens	Poles
0	0	0
- Statistics up to date as of January 13, 2025.

Michael Sosebee (born December 20, 1966) is an American former professional stock car racing driver who competed in the ARCA Racing Series for seven races in 2010, getting a best finish of 28th at Toledo Speedway and Salem Speedway.

Sosebee also previously competed in the X-1R Pro Cup Series.

== Motorsports results ==
=== ARCA Racing Series ===
(key) (Bold – Pole position awarded by qualifying time. Italics – Pole position earned by points standings or practice time. * – Most laps led.)

ARCA Racing Series results
Year	Team	No.	Make	1	2	3	4	5	6	7	8	9	10	11	12	13	14	15	16	17	18	19	20	ARSC	Pts	Ref
2010	Mark Gibson Racing	68	Chevy	DAY	PBE	SLM	TEX	TAL	TOL	POC	MCH	IOW	MFD	POC	BLN; 29	NJE; 32								34th	795	
2010	Mark Gibson Racing	9	Dodge														ISF; 34		DSF; 33					34th	795	
2010	Mark Gibson Racing	68	Dodge															CHI; 35		TOL; 28		KAN; DNQ		34th	795	
2010	Mark Gibson Racing	18	Dodge																		SLM; 28			34th	795	
2010	Mark Gibson Racing	59	Dodge																				CAR; 38	34th	795	
