= Kyle Belmont =

American racing driver (born 1994)

- Born: July 11, 1994 (age 32); Penndel, Pennsylvania, U.S.
- Height: 4’11”

ARCA Menards Series career
- 4 races run over 2 years
- Best finish: 75th (2010)
- First race: 2010 Berlin ARCA 200 (Berlin)
- Last race: 2011 Hantz Group 200 (Berlin)
Wins	Top tens	Poles
0	0	0
- Statistics up to date as of July 6, 2023.

Kyle J. Belmont (born July 11, 1994) is an American professional stock car racing driver who currently works for Team Penske as a tire specialist and interior mechanic for the No. 2 Ford Mustang driven by Austin Cindric in the NASCAR Cup Series. He has previously competed in the ARCA Racing Series. He is the son of former driver Andy Belmont.

== Racing career ==
In 2010, Belmont made his ARCA Racing Series debut at the age of fifteen at Berlin Raceway, driving the No. 6 Toyota for Eddie Sharp Racing, where he would finish 28th after running only three laps due to handling issues. He would then run the next two races for the team at New Jersey Motorsports Park, where he would finish 30th due to handling issues, and the Illinois State Fairgrounds dirt track, where he would finish 31st due to suspension issues. He would make one more start in the series the following year, this time driving the No. 15 Chevrolet for Venturini Motorsports at Berlin, where he would finish 31st after running two laps due to handling issues. His most recent start as a driver came in the Bob Hilbert Sportswear Short Track Super Series Crate 602 Sportsman Tour race at Cherokee Raceway in 2020, where he would finish eighth after starting seventeenth.

Belmont has previously worked at a crew member for Wood Brothers Racing and the No. 21 Ford driven by Ryan Blaney, and it was in Belmont's final year with the team that Blaney would finish ninth in the points having make it to the Round of 8 and getting a win at Pocono Raceway earlier in the year. Belmont would then move over to Team Penske in 2018, where he has remained with as of 2023. In 2022, he was assigned as the interior mechanic and tire specialist for the No. 2 Ford of Austin Cindric, who would win that years Daytona 500.

== Personal life ==
Belmont has a brother named Andrew, who has also raced in the ARCA Racing Series.

== Motorsports results ==
=== ARCA Racing Series ===
(key) (Bold – Pole position awarded by qualifying time. Italics – Pole position earned by points standings or practice time. * – Most laps led.)

ARCA Racing Series results
Year	Team	No.	Make	1	2	3	4	5	6	7	8	9	10	11	12	13	14	15	16	17	18	19	20	ARSC	Pts	Ref
2010	Eddie Sharp Racing	6	Toyota	DAY	PBE	SLM	TEX	TAL	TOL	POC	MCH	IOW	MFD	POC	BLN; 28	NJE; 30	ISF; 31	CHI	DSF	TOL	SLM	KAN	CAR	75th	245	
2011	Venturini Motorsports	15	Chevy	DAY	TAL	SLM	TOL	NJE	CHI	POC	MCH	WIN	BLN; 31	IOW	IRP	POC	ISF	MAD	DSF	SLM	KAN	TOL		154th	75	
