= Ray Mooi =

American racing driver

- Born: February 12, 1989 (age 37); New Lenox, Illinois, U.S.

ARCA Menards Series career
- 4 races run over 3 years
- Best finish: 76th (2007)
- First race: 2007 Request Foods / GFS 200 (Berlin)
- Last race: 2010 Ansell Protective Gloves 150 (Chicagoland)
Wins	Top tens	Poles
0	1	0
- Statistics up to date as of January 25, 2025.

Ray Mooi Jr. (born February 12, 1989) is an American former professional stock car racing driver and team owner who has previously competed in the ARCA Racing Series from 2007 to 2010.

Mooi has also competed in the ASA CRA Super Series and the Mid-American Stock Car Series.

== Motorsports results ==
=== ARCA Racing Series ===
(key) (Bold – Pole position awarded by qualifying time. Italics – Pole position earned by points standings or practice time. * – Most laps led.)

ARCA Racing Series results
Year	Team	No.	Make	1	2	3	4	5	6	7	8	9	10	11	12	13	14	15	16	17	18	19	20	21	22	23	ARSC	Pts	Ref
2007	Cunningham Motorsports	4	Dodge	DAY	USA	NSH	SLM	KAN	WIN	KEN	TOL	IOW	POC	MCH	BLN; 27	KEN	POC	NSH	ISF	MIL	GTW	DSF	CHI	SLM; 33	TAL	TOL; 9	76th	345	
2008	Mark Gibson Racing	59	Chevy	DAY; DNQ	SLM	IOW	KAN	CAR	KEN	TOL	POC	MCH	CAY	KEN	BLN	POC	NSH	ISF	DSF	CHI	SLM	NJE	TAL	TOL			N/A	0	
2010	Eddie Sharp Racing	6	Toyota	DAY	PBE	SLM	TEX	TAL	TOL	POC	MCH	IOW	MFD	POC	BLN	NJE	ISF	CHI; 36	DSF	TOL	SLM	KAN	CAR				135th	50	
