= Mike Young (racing driver) =

American racing driver

- Born: September 14, 1989 (age 37); Toledo, Ohio, U.S.

ARCA Menards Series career
- 5 races run over 3 years
- Best finish: 72nd (2011)
- First race: 2010 Berlin ARCA 200 (Berlin)
- Last race: 2012 Berlin ARCA 200 Presented by Hantz Group (Berlin)
Wins	Top tens	Poles
0	0	0
- Statistics up to date as of February 5, 2025.

Mike Young (born September 14, 1989) is an American professional stock car racing driver who has previously competed in the ARCA Racing Series from 2010 to 2012.

Young has previously competed in series such as the ARCA Late Model Gold Cup Series, the ARCA Late Model Sportsman R&M Recycling Silver Cup, the ARCA Truck Series, and the ARCA Late Model Gold Cup Series.

== Motorsports results ==
=== ARCA Racing Series ===
(key) (Bold – Pole position awarded by qualifying time. Italics – Pole position earned by points standings or practice time. * – Most laps led.)

ARCA Racing Series results
Year	Team	No.	Make	1	2	3	4	5	6	7	8	9	10	11	12	13	14	15	16	17	18	19	20	ARSC	Pts	Ref
2010	Brad Smith Motorsports	2	Ford	DAY	PBE	SLM	TEX	TAL	TOL	POC	MCH	IOW	MFD	POC	BLN; 31	NJE	ISF	CHI	DSF	TOL; 31	SLM	KAN	CAR	98th	150	
2011	Paul Young	7	Chevy	DAY	TAL	SLM	TOL; 19	NJE	CHI	POC	MCH	WIN; 15	BLN	IOW	IRP	POC	ISF	MAD	DSF	SLM	KAN	TOL		72nd	290	
2012	Roulo Brothers Racing	99	Ford	DAY	MOB	SLM	TAL	TOL	ELK	POC	MCH	WIN	NJE	IOW	CHI	IRP	POC	BLN; 28	ISF	MAD	SLM	DSF	KAN	143rd	65	
