= Jesse Smith (racing driver) =

American racing driver

- Born: August 8, 1989 (age 37); Wildwood, Missouri, U.S.

NASCAR FedEx Freight Truck Series career
- 1 race run over 1 year
- 2010 position: 109th
- Best finish: 109th (2010)
- First race: 2010 O'Reilly Auto Parts 250 (Kansas)
Wins	Top tens	Poles
0	0	0

Jesse Smith (born August 8, 1989) is an American professional stock car racing driver. He has raced in the NASCAR Camping World Truck Series and the ARCA Racing Series.

== Motorsports career results ==
=== NASCAR ===
(key) (Bold – Pole position awarded by qualifying time. Italics – Pole position earned by points standings or practice time. * – Most laps led.)

==== Camping World Truck Series ====
NASCAR Camping World Truck Series results
Year	Team	No.	Make	1	2	3	4	5	6	7	8	9	10	11	12	13	14	15	16	17	18	19	20	21	22	23	24	25	NGOTC	Pts	Ref
2010	Stringer Motorsports	90	Toyota	DAY	ATL	MAR	NSH	KAN; 29	DOV	CLT	TEX	MCH	IOW	GTW	IRP	POC	NSH	DAR	BRI	CHI	KEN	NHA	LVS	MAR	TAL	TEX	PHO	HOM	109th	76	

^{*} Season still in progress
^{1} Ineligible for series points

=== ARCA Racing Series ===
(key) (Bold – Pole position awarded by qualifying time. Italics – Pole position earned by points standings or practice time. * – Most laps led.)

ARCA Racing Series results
Year	Team	No.	Make	1	2	3	4	5	6	7	8	9	10	11	12	13	14	15	16	17	18	19	20	21	22	23	ARSC	Pts	Ref
2007	Allgaier Motorsports	0	Chevy	DAY	USA	NSH	SLM	KAN	WIN	KEN	TOL	IOW	POC	MCH	BLN	KEN	POC	NSH	ISF	MIL	GTW	DSF	CHI	SLM	TAL	TOL; 32	163rd	70	
2008	Allgaier Motorsports	36	Dodge	DAY; DNQ	SLM																						30th	1205	
2008	Jones Group Racing	30	Dodge			IOW; 5	KAN; 3	CAR; 44	KEN; 30	TOL	POC; 29	MCH; 8	CAY	KEN; 11	BLN	POC	NSH	ISF	DSF	CHI; 5	SLM	NJM	TAL	TOL			30th	1205	
2009	Venturini Motorsports	25	Chevy	DAY	SLM	CAR	TAL	KEN; 3	TOL	POC	MCH; 31	MFD	IOW	KEN	BLN	POC	ISF						KAN; 31	CAR			52nd	580	
2009	Venturini Motorsports	15	Toyota															CHI; 7	TOL	DSF	NJM	SLM					52nd	580	
2010	Jones Group Racing	29	Dodge	DAY; 32	PBE	SLM	TEX	TAL	TOL	POC	MCH	IOW	MFD	POC	BLN	NJM	ISF	CHI	DSF	TOL	SLM	KAN					78th	235	
2010	Venturini Motorsports	66	Chevy																				CAR; 13				78th	235	
