= Tony Palumbo =

American racing driver

- Born: June 11, 1975 (age 51); Frankfort, Illinois, U.S.

ARCA Menards Series career
- 9 races run over 3 years
- Best finish: 49th (2009)
- First race: 2009 Racing For Wildlife 200 (Michigan)
- Last race: 2011 RainEater Wiper Blades 200 (Michigan)
Wins	Top tens	Poles
0	0	0
- Statistics up to date as of January 14, 2025.

Tony Palumbo (born June 11, 1975) is an American former professional stock car racing driver who has competed in the ARCA Racing Series from 2009 to 2011.

== Motorsports results ==
=== ARCA Racing Series ===
(key) (Bold – Pole position awarded by qualifying time. Italics – Pole position earned by points standings or practice time. * – Most laps led.)

ARCA Racing Series results
Year	Team	No.	Make	1	2	3	4	5	6	7	8	9	10	11	12	13	14	15	16	17	18	19	20	21	ARSC	Pts	Ref
2009	7VN Motorsports	70	Ford	DAY	SLM	CAR; DNQ	TAL	KEN	TOL; DNQ	POC	MCH; 23	MFD	IOW	KEN	BLN	POC; 39	ISF	CHI; 30	TOL	DSF	NJE	SLM	KAN	CAR; 27	49th	600	
2010	7VN Motorsports	70	Ford	DAY	PBE	SLM	TEX	TAL	TOL	POC	MCH; 26	IOW						CHI; 17	DSF	TOL	SLM	KAN	CAR; 33		58th	395	
2010	Venturini Motorsports	15	Chevy										MFD; 29	POC	BLN	NJE	ISF								58th	395	
2011	7VN Motorsports	70	Ford	DAY	TAL	SLM	TOL	NJE	CHI	POC	MCH; 18	WIN	BLN	IOW	IRP	POC	ISF	MAD	DSF	SLM	KAN	TOL			120th	140	
