= Tyler Miles =

American racing driver (born 1992)

- Born: February 27, 1992 (age 34); Pulaski, Tennessee, U.S.

ARCA Menards Series career
- 5 races run over 2 years
- Best finish: 61st (2010)
- First race: 2010 Menards 200 (Toledo)
- Last race: 2015 Sioux Chief PowerPEX 200 (Indianapolis)
Wins	Top tens	Poles
0	0	0
- Statistics up to date as of January 21, 2025.

Tyler Miles (born February 27, 1992) is an American former professional stock car racing driver who has previously competed in the ARCA Racing Series from 2010 to 2015.

Miles also competed in series such as the ASA Southern Super Series, the ASA Southeast Asphalt Tour, and the Show Me The Money Pro Late Model Series.

== Motorsports results ==
=== ARCA Racing Series ===
(key) (Bold – Pole position awarded by qualifying time. Italics – Pole position earned by points standings or practice time. * – Most laps led.)

ARCA Racing Series results
Year	Team	No.	Make	1	2	3	4	5	6	7	8	9	10	11	12	13	14	15	16	17	18	19	20	ARSC	Pts	Ref
2010	Wayne Peterson Racing	06	Ford	DAY	PBE	SLM	TEX	TAL	TOL; 29	POC	MCH	IOW; 32	MFD	POC	BLN	NJE	ISF	CHI	DSF	TOL; 25	SLM; 23	KAN	CAR	61st	375	
2015	Wayne Peterson Racing	06	Ford	DAY	MOB	NSH	SLM	TAL	TOL	NJE	POC	MCH	CHI	WIN	IOW	IRP; 25	POC	BLN	ISF	DSF	SLM	KEN	KAN	125th	105	
