= Rob Jones (racing driver) =

American racing driver

- Born: August 21, 1972 (age 54); Tuscaloosa, Alabama, U.S.

ARCA Menards Series career
- 31 races run over 3 years
- Best finish: 17th (2010)
- First race: 2007 Winchester ARCA 200 (Winchester)
- Last race: 2011 Kansas Lottery 98.9 (Kansas)
Wins	Top tens	Poles
0	0	0
- Statistics up to date as of June 19, 2023.

Rob Jones (born August 21, 1972) is an American professional stock car racing driver who has previously competed in the ARCA Racing Series, primarily driving for Hixson Motorsports.

== Racing career ==
In 2007, Jones would run the ARCA Truck Series, entering twelve of the thirteen races on the schedule with a best finish of eleventh at Sauble Sppedway. He would finish sixteenth in the point standings at the end of the year. It was also during this year that Jones would make his ARCA Re/Max Series debut at Winchester Speedway driving the No. 25 Chevrolet for Venturini Motorsports, starting 24th and finishing 34th after five laps due to handling issues.

From 2008 to 2009, Jones would run in the Super Cup Stock Car Series, finishing in the top-ten in points in both years with a best points finish of sixth in 2008. Jones would return to the now ARCA Racing Series in 2010, running all the but the season-opening race at Daytona International Speedway. He would first run four races at the beginning of the year with Wayne Peterson Racing in the No. 0 entry, before moving to Hixson Motorsports to drive a variety of entries for the team for the remainder of the schedule. He would finish seventeenth in the final point standings with a best result of 21st at Toledo Speedway. He would downsize his schedule for 2011, running eleven races, including a one-off start for Venturini Motorsports in the No. 15 Chevrolet at Toledo, starting fifteenth and finish 30th after only two laps due to issue with the car's rear end.

Jones has recently competed in the Super Cup Stock Car Series, with his most recent start coming in 2022 at Shenandoah Speedway, where he finished sixth.

== Personal life ==
Jones is a former graduate of Delaware State University, where he would obtain a Bachelor of Science Degree in Aircraft Systems Management. He has also served as a pilot in the Air National Guard in Maryland, and would be hired by UPS shortly after his promotion.

== Motorsports results ==
=== ARCA Racing Series ===
(key) (Bold – Pole position awarded by qualifying time. Italics – Pole position earned by points standings or practice time. * – Most laps led.)

ARCA Racing Series results
Year	Team	No.	Make	1	2	3	4	5	6	7	8	9	10	11	12	13	14	15	16	17	18	19	20	21	22	23	ARSC	Pts	Ref
2007	Venturini Motorsports	25	Chevy	DAY	USA	NSH	SLM	KAN	WIN; 34	KEN	TOL	IOW	POC	MCH	BLN	KEN	POC	NSH	ISF	MIL	GTW	DSF	CHI	SLM	TAL	TOL	173rd	60	
2010	Wayne Peterson Racing	0	Ford	DAY	PBE; 33	SLM; 33																					17th	2310	
2010	Wayne Peterson Racing	0	Chevy				TEX; 38	TAL; 38																			17th	2310	
2010	Hixson Motorsports	23	Chevy						TOL; 21			IOW; 25						CHI; 34				KAN; 26					17th	2310	
2010	Hixson Motorsports	7	Chevy							POC; 32						NJE; 28	ISF; 27										17th	2310	
2010	Hixson Motorsports	28	Chevy								MCH; 31		MFD; 23						DSF; 24	TOL; 26	SLM; 25		CAR; 39				17th	2310	
2010	Hixson Motorsports	8	Chevy											POC; 33													17th	2310	
2010	Hixson Motorsports	28	Ford												BLN; 26												17th	2310	
2011	Hixson Motorsports	28	Chevy	DAY	TAL; 24	SLM			CHI; 14	POC	MCH; 17																23rd	1170	
2011	Venturini Motorsports	15	Chevy				TOL; 30	NJE																			23rd	1170	
2011	Hixson Motorsports	29	Chevy									WIN; 28	BLN; 26		IRP; DNQ	POC	ISF; 29	MAD	DSF; 31								23rd	1170	
2011	Hixson Motorsports	21	Chevy											IOW; 34													23rd	1170	
2011	Hixson Motorsports	23	Chevy																	SLM; 15	KAN; 29	TOL					23rd	1170	
