= Brandon Kidd =

American racing driver

- Born: February 13, 1992 (age 34); Manlius, New York, U.S.

ARCA Menards Series career
- 5 races run over 3 years
- Best finish: 65th (2011)
- First race: 2010 Berlin ARCA 200 (Berlin)
- Last race: 2012 Menards 200 (Toledo)
Wins	Top tens	Poles
0	0	0
- Statistics up to date as of January 21, 2025.

Brandon Kidd (born February 13, 1992) is an American professional auto racing driver who has previously competed in the ARCA Racing Series and the Michelin Pilot Challenge.

Kidd also competed in series such as the Lucas Oil Empire Super Sprint Series, the United Racing Club, the Southern Ontario Sprints Series, and the Patriot Sprint Tour.

== Motorsports results ==
=== ARCA Racing Series ===
(key) (Bold – Pole position awarded by qualifying time. Italics – Pole position earned by points standings or practice time. * – Most laps led.)

ARCA Racing Series results
Year	Team	No.	Make	1	2	3	4	5	6	7	8	9	10	11	12	13	14	15	16	17	18	19	20	ARSC	Pts	Ref
2010	Bobby Gerhart Racing	5	Chevy	DAY	PBE	SLM	TEX	TAL	TOL	POC	MCH	IOW	MFD	POC	BLN; 12	NJE	ISF	CHI	DSF	TOL	SLM	KAN	CAR	93rd	170	
2011	Bobby Gerhart Racing	7	Chevy	DAY	TAL	SLM	TOL	NJE	CHI	POC	MCH	WIN	BLN	IOW; 17	IRP; 14	POC; 38	ISF	MAD	DSF	SLM	KAN	TOL		65th	345	
2012	Andy Belmont Racing	2	Ford	DAY	MOB	SLM	TAL	TOL; 18	ELK	POC	MCH	WIN	NJE	IOW	CHI	IRP	POC	BLN	ISF	MAD	SLM	DSF	KAN	112th	140	
