= Kyle Martel =

American racing driver (born 1987)

- Born: July 2, 1987 (age 39); Lebanon, Pennsylvania, U.S.

NASCAR FedEx Freight Truck Series career
- 7 races run over 5 years
- 2016 position: 64th
- Best finish: 50th (2013)
- First race: 2012 Pocono Mountains 125 (Pocono)
- Last race: 2016 Pocono Mountains 150 (Pocono)
Wins	Top tens	Poles
0	0	0

Kyle Martel (born July 2, 1987) is an American former professional stock car racing driver. He last competed in the 2016 NASCAR Camping World Truck Series, driving the No. 59 Chevrolet Silverado for Bill Martel Racing.

== Racing career ==
=== Camping World Truck Series ===
Martel made his Truck Series debut at Pocono in 2012, driving the No. 59 Chevrolet Silverado for his own team, Bill Martel Racing. He started 32nd and finished 21st.

Martel has raced in every Pocono race from 2012 to 2016 in the No. 59 truck. He also competed in the Homestead race in 2014.

=== ARCA Racing Series ===
Martel has also competed in a total of 17 select races from 2009 to 2014 in the ARCA Racing Series, and has finished in the top-ten twice.

== Motorsports career results ==
=== NASCAR ===
(key) (Bold – Pole position awarded by qualifying time. Italics – Pole position earned by points standings or practice time. * – Most laps led.)

==== Camping World Truck Series ====
NASCAR Camping World Truck Series results
Year	Team	No.	Make	1	2	3	4	5	6	7	8	9	10	11	12	13	14	15	16	17	18	19	20	21	22	23	NCWTC	Pts	Ref
2012	Bill Martel Racing	59	Chevy	DAY	MAR	CAR	KAN	CLT	DOV	TEX	KEN	IOW	CHI	POC; 21	MCH	BRI	ATL	IOW	KEN	LVS	TAL	MAR	TEX	PHO	HOM		100th	0^{1}	
2013	Bill Martel Racing	59	Chevy	DAY	MAR	CAR	KAN	CLT	DOV; 26	TEX	KEN	IOW	ELD	POC; 22	MCH	BRI	MSP	IOW	CHI	LVS	TAL	MAR	TEX	PHO	HOM		50th	40	
2014	Bill Martel Racing	59	Chevy	DAY	MAR	KAN	CLT	DOV	TEX	GTW	KEN	IOW	ELD	POC; 27	MCH	BRI	MSP	CHI	NHA	LVS	TAL	MAR	TEX	PHO	HOM; 25		61st	36	
2015	Bill Martel Racing	59	Chevy	DAY	ATL	MAR	KAN	CLT	DOV; DNQ	TEX	GTW	IOW	KEN	ELD													66th	25	
2015	Bill Martel Racing	50	Chevy												POC; 19	MCH	BRI	MSP	CHI	NHA	LVS	TAL	MAR	TEX	PHO	HOM	66th	25	
2016	Bill Martel Racing	59	Chevy	DAY	ATL	MAR	KAN	DOV	CLT	TEX	IOW	GTW	KEN	ELD	POC; 19	BRI	MCH	MSP	CHI	NHA	LVS	TAL	MAR	TEX	PHO	HOM	64th	14	

=== ARCA Racing Series ===
(key) (Bold – Pole position awarded by qualifying time. Italics – Pole position earned by points standings or practice time. * – Most laps led.)

ARCA Racing Series results
Year	Team	No.	Make	1	2	3	4	5	6	7	8	9	10	11	12	13	14	15	16	17	18	19	20	21	ARSC	Pts	Ref
2009	Bill Martel Racing	43	Chevy	DAY	SLM	CAR; 18	TAL	KEN	TOL	POC; 18	MCH	MFD	IOW	KEN	BLN	POC; 10	ISF	CHI; 20	TOL	DSF	NJE	SLM	KAN	CAR; 36	34th	895	
2010	Bill Martel Racing	43	Chevy	DAY; DNQ	PBE	SLM	TEX	TAL; 12	TOL	POC; 13	MCH	IOW	MFD	POC; 19	BLN			CHI; 13	DSF	TOL	SLM	KAN	CAR		36th	745	
2010	Venturini Motorsports	15	Chevy													NJE; 29	ISF								36th	745	
2011	Bill Martel Racing	43	Chevy	DAY	TAL	SLM	TOL	NJE	CHI	POC; 14	MCH	WIN	BLN	IOW	IRP	POC; 36	ISF	MAD	DSF	SLM	KAN	TOL			89th	210	
2012	Bill Martel Racing	43	Chevy	DAY	MOB	SLM	TAL	TOL	ELK	POC	MCH	WIN	NJE	IOW	CHI	IRP	POC; 11	BLN	ISF	MAD	SLM	DSF	KAN		99th	175	
2013	Bill Martel Racing	43	Chevy	DAY	MOB	SLM	TAL	TOL	ELK	POC; 32	MCH	ROA	WIN	CHI	NJE	POC; 10	BLN	ISF	MAD	DSF	IOW	SLM	KEN	KAN	88th	250	
2014	Bill Martel Racing	43	Chevy	DAY	MOB	SLM	TAL	TOL	NJE	POC; 14	MCH	ELK	WIN	CHI	IRP	POC; 28	BLN	ISF	MAD	DSF	SLM	KEN	KAN		67th	250	

^{*} Season still in progress
^{1} Post entry, driver and owner did not score points
