= Tom Berte =

American professional stock car driver

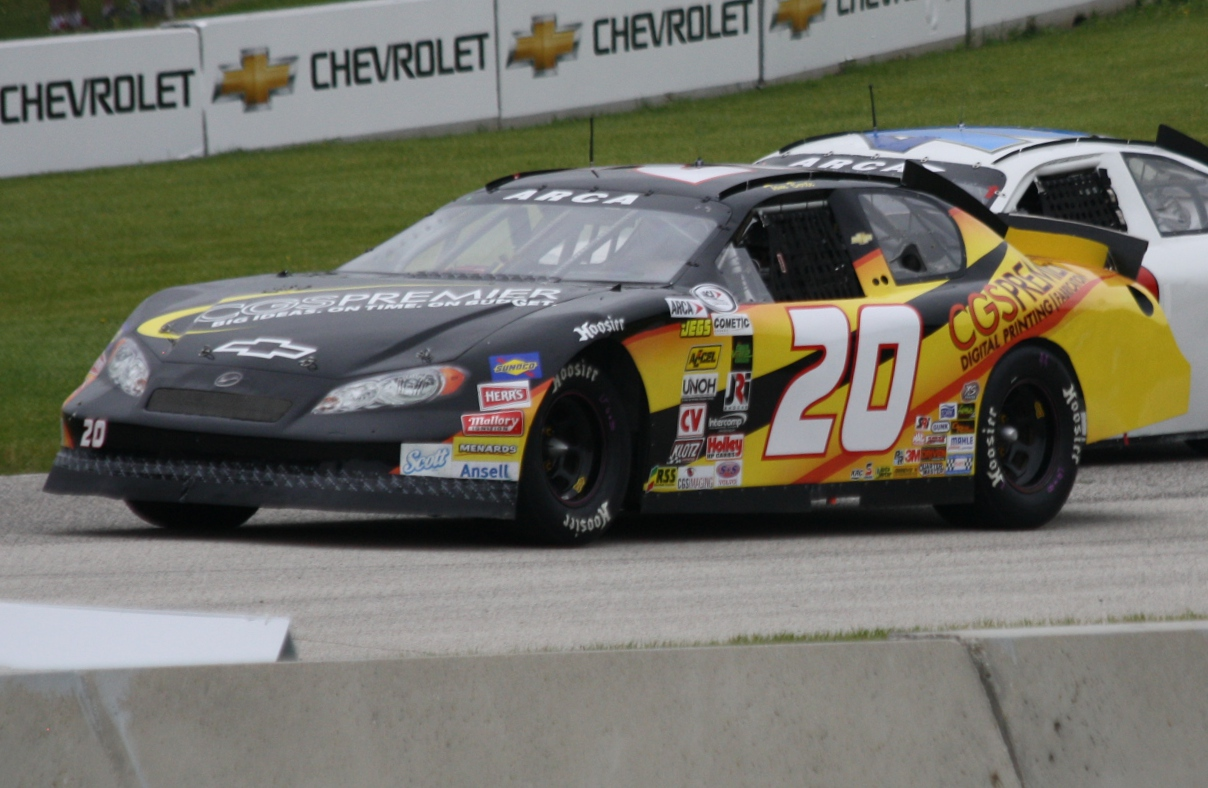
- Berte's No. 20 car at Road America in 2013
- Born: September 25, 1943 (age 83) New Berlin, Wisconsin, U.S.
- Debut season: 2005
- Starts: 69
- Championships: 0
- Wins: 0
- Podiums: 0
- Poles: 0
- Best finish: 28th in 2016
- Statistics up to date as of October 28, 2022.

Tom Berte (born September 25, 1943) is an American semi-retired professional stock car racing driver. He has competed in the ARCA Menards Series from 2003 to 2020, with a majority of his starts being with Venturini Motorsports. He last competed part time in the No. 12 Toyota for Fast Track Racing.

== Racing career ==
Berte attempted to make his ARCA Re/Max Series debut in 2003, driving for his own team in the No. 40 Chevrolet at Lowe's Motor Speedway, but ultimately failed to qualify. He would attempt to qualify for two races the following year, and Charlotte and at Chicagoland Speedway, failing to qualify for both events.

Berte would eventually make his first start in 2005, driving the No. 10 Pontiac for Fast Track Racing at the Milwaukee Mile, finishing 28th in the event. He would make one more start in the year, driving at Chicagoland, finishing 41st due to electrical issues. He would make three more starts in the following year, earning a best finish of fourteenth at Pocono Raceway. He also attempted to qualify for the inaugural race at Iowa Speedway driving for Roulo Brothers Racing, but ultimately failing to qualify.

For 2007, Berte would join Venturini Motorsports for a select number of races in the No. 25 Chevrolet, entering seven races, making six and failing to qualify at Kentucky Speedway. He secured a best finish of thirteenth at the first Pocono race. He would remain with Venturini for 2008, driving for various entries, with a season-best fifteenth at New Jersey Motorsports Park.

Berte would stay with the team for 2009–2012, mainly driving the No. 35 Chevrolet for six races that year with a best finish of fifteenth at Millville, New Jersey. For the next year, he would run the No. 15 along with the No. 35 in select races with a best finish of fourteenth at Pocono after an engine failure at Palm Beach International Raceway and a crash at Texas Motor Speedway in his first two starts of the year. He would remain in those entries for 2011, upping his best career finish with a 13th at Michigan Speedway. For 2012, he would run four races in the No. 20 and No. 35 in select races with a best finish of 17th in his first start of the year at Michigan.

For 2013 to 2016, Berte would race with his own team, Tom Berte Racing, driving the No. 20 Chevrolet/Toyota in five races with a best finish of seventeenth at Road America. In the following year, Berte would run in five races with a best finish of thirteenth at Chicagoland, but was involved in a crash at the season finale at Kansas Speedway with Dale Shearer and Galen Hassler. This also included a one off in the No. 66 Chevrolet at Pocono with points borrowed from Venturini Motorsports. Berte would plan to race in seven events in 2015, including both Pocono events, Michigan, Iowa, Chicagoland, Kentucky and Kansas, although he would not enter in the Michigan event. In the second Pocono races, Berte would earn his first top-10 at Pocono with a tenth place finish. For the 2016 season, he would seven races with a best finish of twelfth at Kentucky. He would race in Kansas, before, in what was originally announced to be his final ARCA race, he retired with an engine issue and finished 31st.

Despite his initial retirement announcement, Berte would return to Venturini Motorsports for two races in 2017, running at Pocono in the No. 20 Toyota, finishing fifteenth, and at Chicagoland in the No. 55 entry, where he would finish sixteenth.

Berte would return to Fast Track Racing in 2018 driving the No. 10 for three races with a best result of nineteenth at Charlotte and Chicagoland, and after a year absence, he would return with the team in 2020 at Phoenix driving the No. 12 Toyota, where he would finish nineteenth due to a crash. He has not run in the series since then.

== Personal life ==
Berte is the vice-president and chief financial officer of CGS Premier, a fabricating and designing company for mobile health clinics based in Muskego, Wisconsin that has sponsored Berte during the course of his racing career.

== Motorsports results ==
=== ARCA Menards Series ===
(key) (Bold – Pole position awarded by qualifying time. Italics – Pole position earned by points standings or practice time. * – Most laps led.)

ARCA Menards Series results
Year	Team	No.	Make	1	2	3	4	5	6	7	8	9	10	11	12	13	14	15	16	17	18	19	20	21	22	23	AMSC	Pts	Ref
2003	Tom Berte Racing	40	Chevy	DAY	ATL	NSH	SLM	TOL	KEN	CLT	BLN	KAN	MCH	LER	POC	POC	NSH	ISF	WIN	DSF	CHI	SLM	TAL	CLT; DNQ	SBO		N/A	0	
2004	Andy Belmont Racing	4	Pontiac	DAY	NSH	SLM	KEN	TOL	CLT; DNQ	KAN	POC	MCH	SBO	BLN	KEN	GTW	POC	LER	NSH	ISF	TOL	DSF					N/A	0	
2004	Fast Track Racing	10	Pontiac																				CHI; DNQ	SLM	TAL		N/A	0	
2005	Fast Track Racing	10	Pontiac	DAY	NSH	SLM	KEN	TOL	LAN	MIL; 28	POC	MCH	KAN	KEN	BLN	POC	GTW	LER	NSH	MCH	ISF	TOL	DSF	CHI; 41	SLM	TAL	142nd	120	
2006	Fast Track Racing	10	Pontiac	DAY	NSH; DNQ	SLM	WIN																				68th	485	
2006	Fast Track Racing	11	Pontiac					KEN; DNQ	TOL																		68th	485	
2006	Fast Track Racing	11	Chevy							POC; 14	MCH	KAN; 19	KEN	BLN	POC	GTW	NSH	MCH	ISF								68th	485	
2006	Bob Aiello	62	Chevy																	MIL; 23	TOL	DSF	CHI	SLM	TAL		68th	485	
2006	Roulo Brothers Racing	39	Chevy																							IOW; DNQ	68th	485	
2007	Venturini Motorsports	25	Chevy	DAY	USA	NSH	SLM	KAN; 33	WIN	KEN; DNQ	TOL	IOW; 19	POC; 13	MCH	BLN	KEN; 23	POC; 29	NSH	ISF	MIL; 16	GTW	DSF	CHI	SLM	TAL	TOL	45th	740	
2008	Venturini Motorsports	25	Chevy	DAY	SLM	IOW; 33					POC; 37	MCH	CAY														42nd	700	
2008	Venturini Motorsports	47	Chevy				KAN; 23	CAR	KEN; 20	TOL																	42nd	700	
2008	Venturini Motorsports	14	Chevy											KEN; 30	BLN												42nd	700	
2008	Venturini Motorsports	48	Chevy													POC; 24	NSH	ISF	DSF	CHI	SLM						42nd	700	
2008	Venturini Motorsports	15	Chevy																			NJE; 15	TAL	TOL			42nd	700	
2009	Venturini Motorsports	35	Chevy	DAY	SLM	CAR	TAL	KEN; 21	TOL	POC; 37	MCH	MFD	IOW	KEN; 27	BLN	POC; 30	ISF	CHI	TOL	DSF	NJE; 15	SLM	KAN; 18	CAR			44th	640	
2010	Venturini Motorsports	35	Chevy	DAY	PBE; 24	SLM	TEX; 29	TAL	TOL	POC; 14	MCH							CHI; 18	DSF	TOL	SLM						32nd	855	
2010	Venturini Motorsports	15	Chevy									IOW; 24	MFD	POC; 21	BLN	NJE	ISF					KAN; 21	CAR				32nd	855	
2011	Venturini Motorsports	35	Chevy	DAY	TAL	SLM	TOL	NJE	CHI; 21		MCH; 13	WIN	BLN			POC; 35	ISF	MAD	DSF	SLM	KAN; 31	TOL					31st	670	
2011	Venturini Motorsports	15	Chevy							POC; 15				IOW; 27	IRP												31st	670	
2012	Venturini Motorsports	20	Chevy	DAY	MOB	SLM	TAL	TOL	ELK	POC	MCH; 20	WIN	NJE; 18										KAN; 18				41st	495	
2012	Venturini Motorsports	35	Chevy											IOW; 26	CHI	IRP	POC; 24	BLN	ISF	MAD	SLM	DSF					41st	495	
2013	Tom Berte Racing	20	Toyota	DAY	MOB	SLM	TAL	TOL	ELK	POC; 18	MCH																31st	860	
2013	Tom Berte Racing	20	Chevy									ROA; 17	WIN	CHI; 18	NJM	POC	BLN	ISF	MAD	DSF	IOW	SLM	KEN; 25	KAN; 22			31st	860	
2014	Tom Berte Racing	66	Chevy	DAY	MOB	SLM	TAL	TOL	NJE	POC; 17	MCH	ELK	WIN														33rd	705	
2014	Tom Berte Racing	20	Chevy											CHI; 13	IRP	POC; 15	BLN	ISF	MAD	DSF	SLM	KEN; 20	KAN; 24				33rd	705	
2015	Tom Berte Racing	20	Chevy	DAY	MOB	NSH	SLM	TAL	TOL	NJE	POC; 21	MCH	CHI; 13	WIN	IOW; 23	IRP						KEN; 34					35th	690	
2015	Tom Berte Racing	20	Toyota														POC; 10	BLN	ISF	DSF	SLM		KAN; 30				35th	690	
2016	Tom Berte Racing	20	Toyota	DAY	NSH	SLM	TAL	TOL	NJE	POC; 23	MCH; 16	MAD	WIN	IOW; 14	IRP	POC; 20	BLN	ISF	DSF	SLM	CHI; 13	KEN; 12	KAN; 31				28th	965	
2017	Venturini Motorsports	20	Toyota	DAY	NSH	SLM	TAL	TOL	ELK	POC	MCH	MAD	IOW	IRP	POC; 15	WIN	ISF	ROA	DSF	SLM							64th	305	
2017	Venturini Motorsports	55	Toyota																		CHI; 16	KEN	KAN				64th	305	
2018	Fast Track Racing	10	Chevy	DAY	NSH	SLM	TAL	TOL	CLT; 19	POC	MCH	MAD	GTW														58th	375	
2018	Fast Track Racing	10	Toyota											CHI; 19	IOW	ELK	POC; 25	ISF	BLN	DSF	SLM	IRP	KAN				58th	375	
2020	Fast Track Racing	12	Toyota	DAY	PHO; 19	TAL	POC	IRP	KEN	IOW	KAN	TOL	TOL	MCH	DAY	GTW	L44	TOL	BRI	WIN	MEM	ISF	KAN				82nd	25	
