= Wayne Hixson =

American racing driver and team owner

- Born: Carl Wayne Hixson; January 4, 1947 (age 79); Soddy Daisy, Tennessee, U.S.

ARCA Menards Series career
- 2 races run over 1 year
- Best finish: 158th (2001)
- First race: 2001 Blue Grass Quality Meats 200 (Kentucky)
- Last race: 2001 ARCA Re/Max 200 (Chicagoland)
Wins	Top tens	Poles
0	0	0
- Statistics up to date as of February 12, 2025.

Carl Wayne Hixson (born January 4, 1947) is an American former professional stock car racing driver and team owner who has previously competed in the ARCA Racing Series for two races in 2001, getting a best finish of 35th at Chicagoland Speedway. He also was the owner of Hixson Motorsports, which formerly competed in the series from 1996 to 2018.

== Motorsports results ==
=== ARCA Re/Max Series ===
(key) (Bold – Pole position awarded by qualifying time. Italics – Pole position earned by points standings or practice time. * – Most laps led.)

ARCA Re/Max Series results
Year	Team	No.	Make	1	2	3	4	5	6	7	8	9	10	11	12	13	14	15	16	17	18	19	20	21	22	23	24	25	ARSC	Pts	Ref
2001	Hixson Motorsports	75	Chevy	DAY	NSH	WIN	SLM	GTY	KEN	CLT	KAN	MCH	POC	MEM	GLN	KEN; 36	MCH	POC	NSH	ISF									158th	105	
2001	Bob Schacht Motorsports	75	Chevy																		CHI; 35	DSF	SLM	TOL	BLN	CLT	TAL	ATL	158th	105	
