= Illinois State Fairgrounds =

- U.S. National Register of Historic Places
- U.S. Historic district
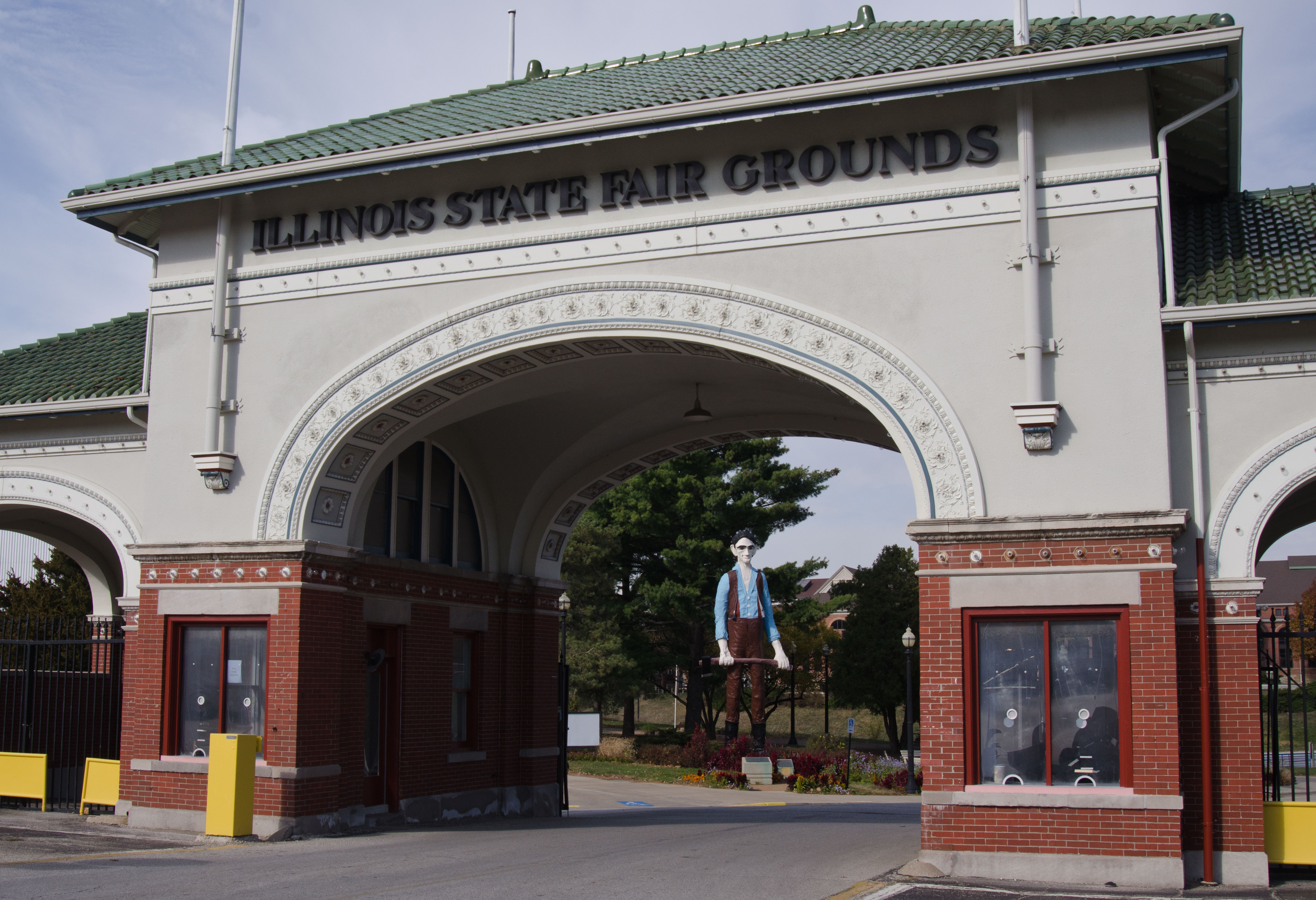

- Location within Illinois Location within the United States
- Location: Jct. of Sangamon Ave. and Peoria Rd., Springfield, Illinois
- Area: 366 acres (148 ha)
- Built: 1894
- Architect: Hammond, Charles Herrick
- Architectural style: Classical Revival
- MPS: Historic Fairgrounds in Illinois MPS
- NRHP reference No.: 90000720
- Added to NRHP: May 14, 1990

The Illinois State Fairgrounds is located in Springfield, Illinois. It hosts the annual Illinois State Fair in the summer as well as other events throughout the year. The fairgrounds encompasses 366 acres of land and was added as a historic district on the National Register of Historic Places in 1990. Notable venues include a 13,000-capacity grandstand and the Illinois State Fairgrounds Racetrack.
