= NJMP ARCA 150 =

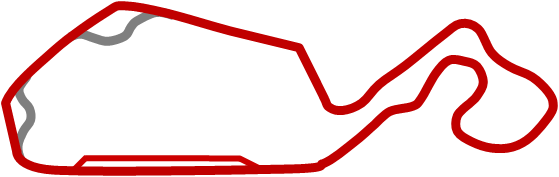

ARCA Racing Series
- Venue: New Jersey Motorsports Park
- First race: 2008
- Last race: 2016
- Distance: 150.8 miles (242.689 km)
- Laps: 67
- Previous names: Loud Energy Drink 150 (2008); South Jersey Building Trades 150 (2009); Garden State ARCA 150 presented by American Red Cross (2010); Modspace 150 (2011); All America Race Weekend presented by Global Barter (2012); Barbera's Autoland 150 (2013); Great Railing 150 presented by Barbera's Autoland (2014); ARCA 150 presented by Unique Pretzels (2015)

The NJMP ARCA 150 was an ARCA Racing Series race held annually at the New Jersey Motorsports Park in Millville, New Jersey. The inaugural race was held in 2008. Andrew Ranger has won the most times, winning the event four times from 2011 to 2014. The final running was held in 2016.

== Past winners ==
Year	Date	Driver	Manufacturer	Race Distance		Race Time	Average Speed (mph)
Year	Date	Driver	Manufacturer	Laps	Miles (km)	Race Time	Average Speed (mph)
2008	September 28	Justin Allgaier	Chevrolet	48*	108 (173.809)	1:59:35	54.188
2009	September 13	Patrick Long	Dodge	67	150.8 (242.689)	1:53:05	79.985
2010	August 15	Casey Roderick	Dodge	67	150.8 (242.689)	2:04:21	72.734
2011	May 22	Andrew Ranger	Dodge	67	150.8 (242.689)	1:52:27	80.433
2012	July 1	Andrew Ranger	Dodge	67	150.8 (242.689)	2:00:33	75.022
2013	July 28	Andrew Ranger	Dodge	67	150.8 (242.689)	1:27:48	81.753
2014	June 1	Andrew Ranger	Dodge	67	150.8 (242.689)	1:24:03	84.274
2015	May 24	Kyle Weatherman	Dodge	67	150.8 (242.689)	2:02:52	73.615
2016	May 28	Parker Kligerman	Dodge	67	150.8 (242.689)	2:05:10	72.261

- 2008: Race shortened due to rain
