= Basham (surname) =

Basham is a habitational surname in English and Arabic. Notable people with the surname include:

- Arthur Llewellyn Basham (1914–1985), British historian and Indologist
- Bilal Basham (born 1991), Bahraini handball player
- Boogie Basham (born 1997), American football player
- Carlos Basham Jr. (born 1997), American football player
- Chris Basham (born 1988), English football player
- Darrell Basham (born 1949), American stock car racing driver
- David Basham (born 1968), Australian politician
- Don Basham (1926–1989), American religious teacher
- Doug Basham (born 1971), American wrestler, ring name Basham
- Dugan Basham (born 1952), American former stock car racing driver
- James Basham (1903–1977), British boxer
- Jason Basham (born 1979), American stock car racing driver
- Johnny Basham (1890–1947), Welsh boxer
- Josh Basham (born 1999), English rugby union footballer
- Mark Basham (born 1962), American tennis player
- Megan Basham, American writer
- Mike Basham (racing driver) (born 1968), American stock car racing driver
- Mike Basham (born 1973), English football player
- Patrick Basham, American scholar
- Raymond E. Basham (born 1945), American politician
- Steve Basham (born 1977), English football player
- Steven L. Basham (born 1965), American lieutenant general in the US Air Force
- Taine Basham (born 1999), Welsh rugby union player
- Tarell Basham (born 1994), American football player
- W. Ralph Basham (born 1943), American Commissioner of US Customs and Border Protection
- William Richard Basham (1804–1877), English physician

== See also ==
- Basham (disambiguation)
