= Barham =

Barham may refer to:

== Places ==
- Barham, New South Wales, Australia
- Barham, Huntingdonshire, Cambridgeshire, England
- Barham, South Cambridgeshire, a Domesday place in Linton, Cambridgeshire, England
- Barham, Kent, England
- Barham, Suffolk, England

== People ==
=== Given name ===
- Barham Salih (born 1960), President of Iraq

=== Surname ===
- Charles Foster Barham (1804–1884), Cornish physician and antiquarian
- Edwards Barham (1937–2014), American politician
- Jaishawn Barham (born 2004), American football player
- Jaxson Barham (born 1988), Australian footballer
- Jeremy Barham (born 1941), English field hockey player
- Joseph Foster Barham (1759–1832), English politician
- Meriel Barham, musician with the English bands Lush and Pale Saints
- Monica Barham (1920–1983), New Zealand architect
- Peter Barham (born 1950), physicist and molecular gastronomer
- Phillip Barham (born 1957), American saxophonist
- Richard Barham (1788–1845), English cleric, novelist and poet

=== Title ===
- Baron Barham, any of several, most notably:
  - Charles Middleton, 1st Baron Barham (1726–1813), Royal Navy admiral and politician

== Other uses ==
- Barham River, in The Otways region of Victoria, Australia
- HMS Barham, four ships of the Royal Navy named after the admiral
