= Basham =

Basham may refer to:

- Basham (surname)
- Basham, Alabama, an unincorporated community in the United States
- Basham, Virginia, an unincorporated community in the United States
- The Basham Brothers, American wrestling tag team of Doug and Danny Basham

== See also ==
- Besham
- Barham (disambiguation)
