= Dugan Basham =

American racing driver (born 1952)

- Born: July 3, 1952 (age 74); Henryville, Indiana, U.S.

ARCA Menards Series career
- 6 races run over 2 years
- Best finish: 47th (2006)
- First race: 2006 Pennsylvania 200 (Pocono)
- Last race: 2007 Request Foods/GFS 200 (Berlin)
| Wins | Top tens | Poles |
|---|---|---|
| 0 | 0 | 0 |
- Statistics up to date as of January 16, 2024.

Dugan Basham (born July 3, 1952) is an American former professional stock car racing driver who has competed in the ARCA Re/Max Series. He is the younger brother of longtime ARCA competitor Darrell Basham.

== Racing career ==
Prior to his starts in ARCA, Basham competed in various dash car and street stock events at tracks like Salem Speedway and Brownstown Speedway.

In 2006, Basham entered in the majority of the races of the ARCA Re/Max Series, primarily in the No. 94 for brother Darrell's Darrell Basham Racing. After failing to qualify in his first seven attempts, he made his official series debut at the second Pocono Raceway event, where he started 39th and finished 31st due to engine issues halfway through the race. He then failed to qualify for the next two races he was entered in before making his second start of the year at the Illinois State Fairgrounds dirt track, this time driving a Pontiac, where he would start 35th and finish 34th after running only three laps due to rear end issues. He failed to qualify for the following two events before qualifying for the race at the DuQuoin State Fairgrounds dirt track, starting and finishing 34th after running only three laps due to handling issues. Afterwards, he failed to qualify for the races at Chicagoland Speedway, Salem Speedway, and the inaugural race at Iowa Speedway.

In 2007, Basham's first two attempts of the year came with Darrell Basham Racing, both of which he failed to qualify for. At the next race at Kansas Speedway, Basham would drive the No. 0 Chevrolet for Wayne Peterson Racing, but failed to qualify. Afterwards, he went back to driving for Darrell Basham Racing for the following race at Winchester Speedway, where he would qualify in 34th and finish in 33rd after running only eight laps due to handling issues. He then failed to qualify for the next two races at Kentucky Speedway and Toledo Speedway, before qualifying for the race at Iowa Speedway, where he started and finished in 34th due to handling issues after five laps. He then qualified for his next race at Berlin Raceway, where he started and finish 32nd after running two laps due to rear end issues. He made only three more attempts later in the year, failing to qualify for all three events. The Berlin event would be his most recent event as a driver.

Alongside his driving duties, Basham also served as a crew chief for Darrell Basham Racing.

== Personal life ==
Basham is the uncle of fellow drivers Jason Basham and Mike Basham, who have also competed in ARCA competition.

Basham also had a daughter named Peggy, who died in 2010.

== Motorsports results ==
=== ARCA Re/Max Series ===
(key) (Bold – Pole position awarded by qualifying time. Italics – Pole position earned by points standings or practice time. * – Most laps led.)

ARCA Re/Max Series results
| Year | Team | No. | Make | 1 | 2 | 3 | 4 | 5 | 6 | 7 | 8 | 9 | 10 | 11 | 12 | 13 | 14 | 15 | 16 | 17 | 18 | 19 | 20 | 21 | 22 | 23 | ARMC | Pts | Ref |
|---|---|---|---|---|---|---|---|---|---|---|---|---|---|---|---|---|---|---|---|---|---|---|---|---|---|---|---|---|---|
| 2006 | Darrell Basham Racing | 94 | Chevy | DAY | NSH | SLM | WIN; DNQ | KEN | TOL; DNQ | POC; DNQ | MCH | KAN; DNQ | KEN; DNQ | BLN; DNQ | POC; 31 | GTW; DNQ | NSH | MCH; DNQ | | MIL; DNQ | TOL; DNQ | | CHI; DNQ | SLM; DNQ | TAL | IOW; DNQ | 47th | 795 | |
| 2006 | Darrell Basham Racing | 94 | Pontiac | | | | | | | | | | | | | | | | ISF; 34 | | | DSF; 34 | | | | | 47th | 795 | |
| 2007 | Darrell Basham Racing | 94 | Chevy | DAY | USA; DNQ | NSH | SLM; DNQ | | | KEN; DNQ | TOL; DNQ | | | | | KEN; DNQ | POC | NSH; DNQ | ISF | MIL | GTW | DSF | CHI | | | | 66th | 395 | |
| 2007 | Wayne Peterson Racing | 0 | Chevy | | | | | KAN; DNQ | | | | | | | | | | | | | | | | | | | 66th | 395 | |
| 2007 | Darrell Basham Racing | 94 | Pontiac | | | | | | WIN; 33 | | | IOW; 34 | POC | MCH | BLN; 32 | | | | | | | | | | | | 66th | 395 | |
| 2007 | Darrell Basham Racing | 94 | Ford | | | | | | | | | | | | | | | | | | | | | SLM; DNQ | TAL | TOL | 66th | 395 | |
