= Taylor Ferns =

American racing driver (born 1995)

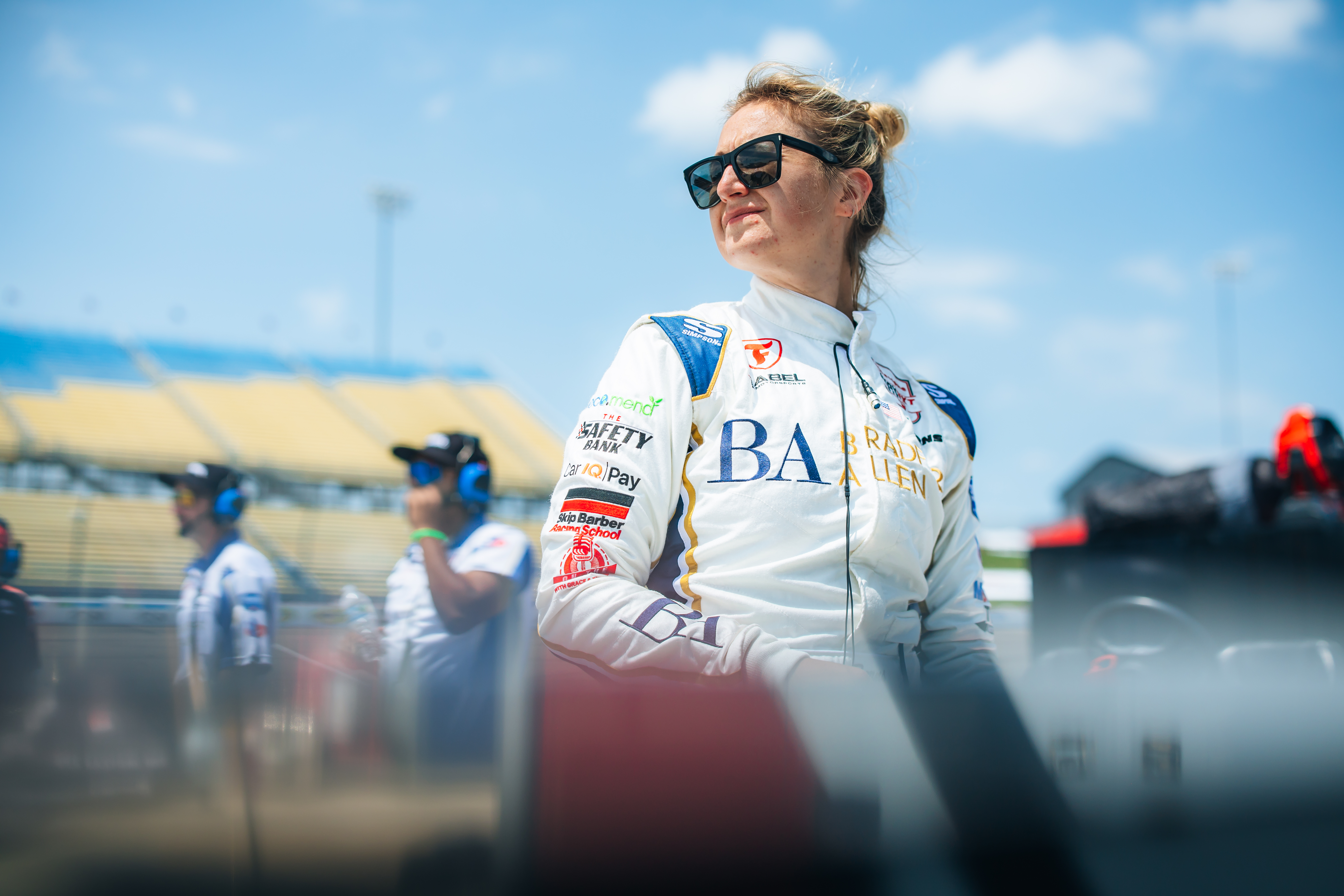
- Ferns at Iowa Speedway in 2024
- Born: Taylor Lynn Ferns; December 12, 1995 (age 30); Shelby Township, Michigan, U.S.

Indy NXT career
- Debut season: 2024
- Starts: 4
- Championships: 0
- Wins: 0
- Podiums: 0
- Poles: 0
- Fastest laps: 0
- Best finish: 24th in 2024

Taylor Lynn Ferns (born December 12, 1995) is an American racing driver, team owner, lawyer, writer for SpeedSport, entrepreneur, and philanthropist. She last competed part-time in Indy NXT driving for Abel Motorsports, as well as in the USAC Silver Crown Series driving for her own team, Taylor Ferns Racing.

== Racing career ==
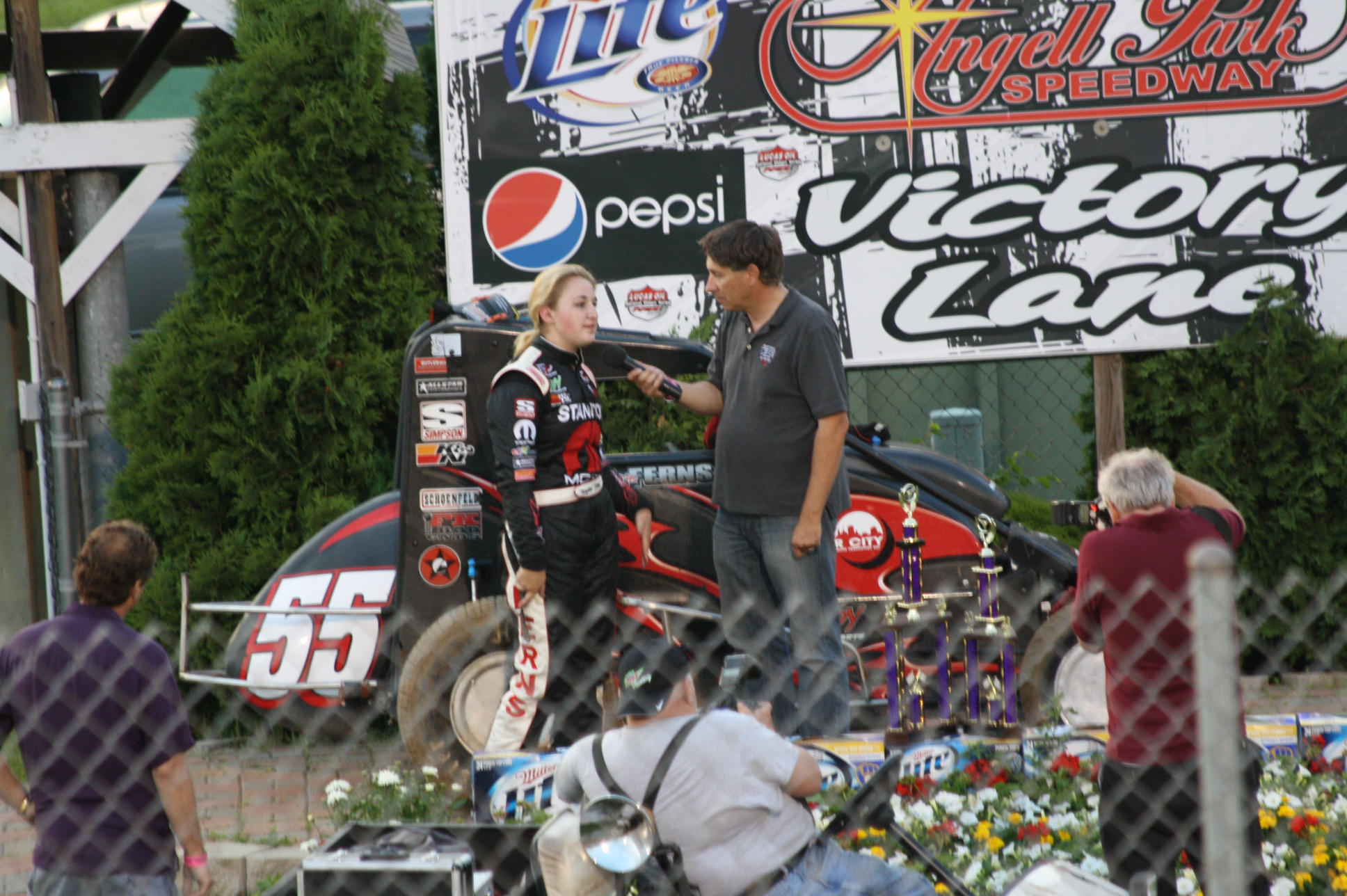
Angell Park 2013 USAC Midget heat winner Taylor Ferns

=== Early Career & Midget Racing (2002–2011) ===
Ferns began racing quarter midgets at age six, influenced by her family's involvement in local stock car racing. In 2010, she transitioned to full-time regional midget and sprint car racing. During her first year at Spartan Speedway, she won four feature races and received Rookie of the Year honors. In 2011, she won the USAC D1 Midget Championship.

=== Stock Cars & ARCA (2012–2013) ===
Her early pavement success led to stock car racing, including regional late models in 2012 and the ARCA Menards Series in 2013. Due to high funding requirements for further NASCAR advancement, she returned to grassroots open-wheel racing.

=== Academic Hiatus & USAC Return (2014–2023) ===
Ferns balanced her education and racing career, eventually pausing full-time driving to earn a bachelor's degree in Finance and Economics, an MBA, and a Juris Doctor.

- 2022 Comeback: Returned to a more regular racing schedule, prioritizing the 500 Sprint Car Tour and the USAC Silver Crown Series under her own team banner, Taylor Ferns Racing.
- 2022–2023 Form: Stamped her historic podium finishes in Silver Crown, collected multiple top-10 finishes on the 500 Sprint Car Tour, and ventured into road racing for the first time by attending the Skip Barber Racing School at Sebring.

=== Indy NXT & Open-Wheel Progression (2024–Present) ===
In 2024, Ferns got a corporate sponsor and signed a part-time deal to race for Abel Motorsports in Indy NXT, the main training series for IndyCar. She brought her short-track skills to major tracks like World Wide Technology Raceway and Nashville Superspeedway working toward her goal of making it to IndyCar.

== Personal life ==
Ferns was born and raised in Shelby Township, Michigan. She grew up in a motorsports-oriented family, with her uncles racing late models and stock cars in Michigan during the 1980s and 1990s. Her father introduced her to quarter midget racing when she was six years old.

== Education ==
In addition to her racing pursuits, Ferns earned her undergraduate degree in finance and economics from Grand Valley State University. She holds an MBA (Masters of Business Administration) from Wayne State University and earned her JD (Juris Doctor) from Wayne State University Law School in May 2024.

== Philanthropy ==
In 2023, Ferns launched The Safety Bank, a charitable initiative designed to make racing safety gear more accessible. In 2024, she announced a partnership with the Shift Up Now Foundation.

== Motorsports career results ==
=== American open–wheel racing results ===
==== Indy NXT ====
(key) (Races in bold indicate pole position) (Races in italics indicate fastest lap) (Races with ^{L} indicate a race lap led) (Races with * indicate most race laps led)

Year	Team	1	2	3	4	5	6	7	8	9	10	11	12	13	14	Rank	Points
2024	Abel Motorsports	STP	BAR	IMS	IMS	DET	ROA	LAG	LAG	MOH	IOW; 16	GTW; 15	POR	MIL; 18	NSH; 18	24th	53

=== ARCA Racing Series ===
(key) (Bold – Pole position awarded by qualifying time. Italics – Pole position earned by points standings or practice time. * – Most laps led.)

ARCA Racing Series results
Year	Team	No.	Make	1	2	3	4	5	6	7	8	9	10	11	12	13	14	15	16	17	18	19	20	21	ARSC	Pts	Ref
2013	Venturini Motorsports	55	Toyota	DAY	MOB; 9	SLM	TAL	TOL; 20	ELK; 12	POC	MCH	ROA	WIN	CHI	NJM	POC; 15	BLN	ISF; 9	MAD	DSF; 10	IOW; 13	SLM	KEN; 12	KAN	20th	1340	

== Consulting firm ==
In 2026, Ferns launched FERNS & CO., a strategic consulting firm focused on business development, partnership cultivation, and strategic planning for clients within and outside the motorsports industry.
