= Caleb Armstrong =

American racing driver

- Born: August 17, 1992 (age 34); New Castle, Indiana, U.S.

ARCA Menards Series career
- 6 races run over 2 years
- Best finish: 34th (2013)
- First race: 2012 Kentuckiana Ford Dealers ARCA Fall Classic (Salem)
- Last race: 2013 Kentuckiana Ford Dealers ARCA Fall Classic (Salem)
Wins	Top tens	Poles
0	2	0
- Statistics up to date as of February 10, 2025.

Caleb Armstrong (born August 17, 1992) is an American professional stock car racing driver who has previously competed in the ARCA Racing Series. He is the cousin of fellow racing driver Dakoda Armstrong, who has also competed in ARCA, as well as the NASCAR Xfinity Series and the NASCAR Camping World Truck Series.

Armstrong has also competed in series such as the USAC Silver Crown Series, the 500 Sprint Car Tour, the Auto Value Bumper to Bumper Super Sprint Series and the All Star Circuit of Champions.

== Motorsports results ==
=== ARCA Racing Series ===
(key) (Bold – Pole position awarded by qualifying time. Italics – Pole position earned by points standings or practice time. * – Most laps led.)

ARCA Racing Series results
Year	Team	No.	Make	1	2	3	4	5	6	7	8	9	10	11	12	13	14	15	16	17	18	19	20	21	ARSC	Pts	Ref
2012	Venturini Motorsports	15	Chevy	DAY	MOB	SLM	TAL	TOL	ELK	POC	MCH	WIN	NJE	IOW	CHI	IRP	POC	BLN	ISF	MAD	SLM; 15	DSF	KAN		104th	155	
2013	Eddie Sharp Racing	6	Chevy	DAY; 34	MOB	SLM																			34th	815	
2013	Venturini Motorsports	55	Toyota				TAL; 3	TOL	ELK	POC	MCH	ROA	WIN												34th	815	
2013	Venturini Motorsports	15	Toyota											CHI; 8	NJM	POC	BLN	ISF	MAD	DSF					34th	815	
2013	Tom Berte Racing	20	Chevy																		IOW; 11				34th	815	
2013	Venturini Motorsports	55	Chevy																			SLM; 11	KEN	KAN	34th	815	
