= Darrell Basham =

American stock car driver and team owner (born 1949)

- Born: March 17, 1949 (age 77) Henryville, Indiana, U.S.

ARCA Menards Series career
- Debut season: 1972
- Current team: Fast Track Racing
- Car number: 11
- Former teams: Darrell Basham Racing, James Hylton Motorsports, Jim Patrick Racing
- Starts: 333
- Wins: 0
- Poles: 0
- Best finish: 7th in 1976

Awards
- 2003, 2011 2012: Spirit Award; Marcum Award

NASCAR Cup Series career
- 1 race run over 1 year
- Best finish: 113th (1979)
- First race: 1979 Sun-Drop Music City USA 420 (Nashville)
Wins	Top tens	Poles
0	0	0
- Statistics up to date as of October 7, 2023.

Darrell Basham (born March 17, 1949) is an American stock car racing driver and former team owner. He last competed part-time in the ARCA Menards Series, driving the No. 11 Ford for Fast Track Racing.

== Racing career ==
=== ARCA Racing Series ===
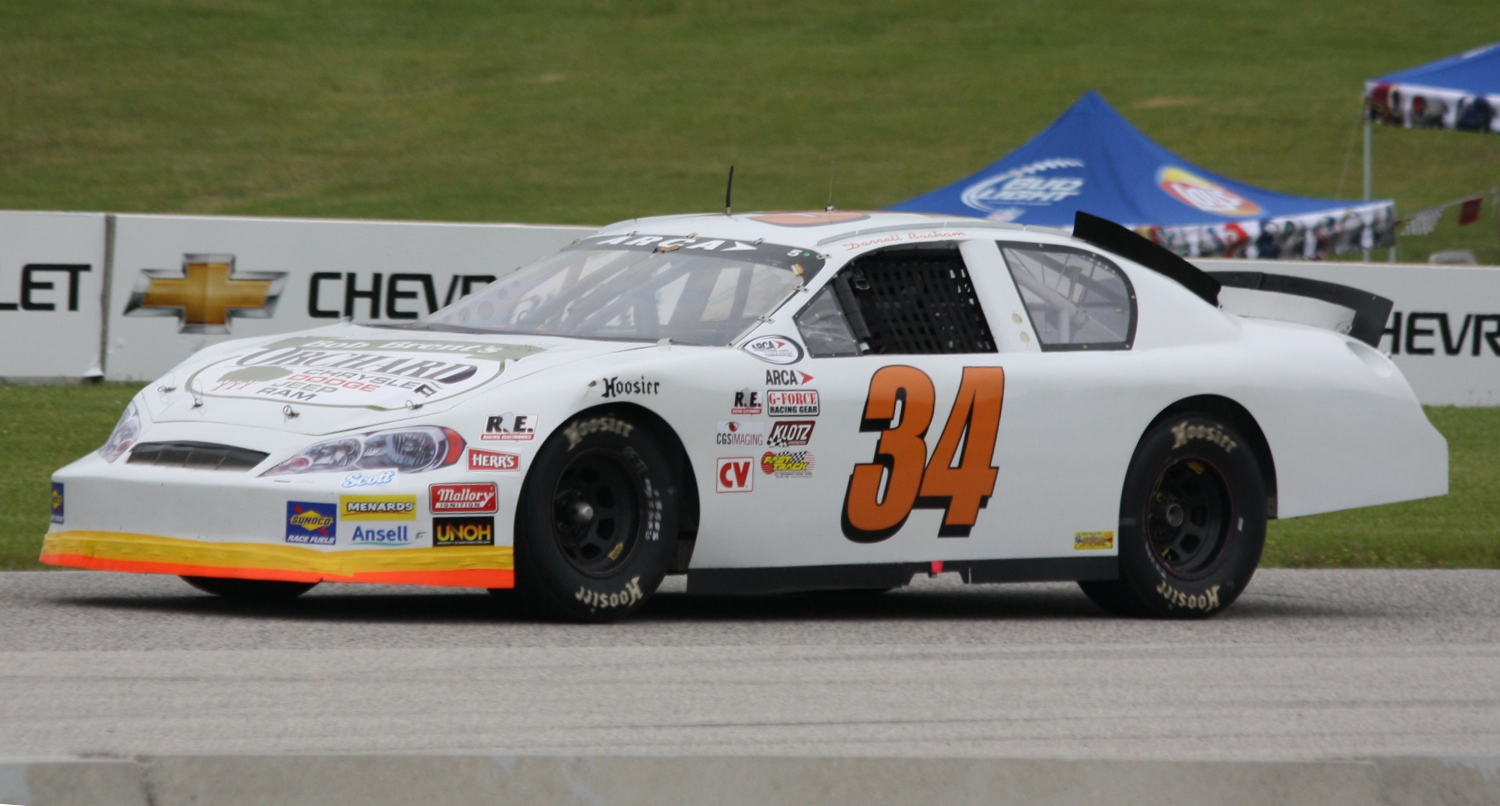
Basham's 2013 ARCA car at Road America

Basham made his ARCA Racing Series debut in 1972. In 1975, Basham posted a career-best finish of fifth twice, both times at Salem Speedway. One year later, he finished a career-best seventh place in the standings.

After driving sporadically over the next two decades, Basham began racing full-time again in 2002. The next season, Basham won the Spirit Award for his dedication and support for ARCA, uplifting spirit by way of example, perseverance, and positive attitude. He finished ninth in the 2009 Lucas Oil Slick Mist 200 at Daytona, tying his career-best finish at the track from 33 years earlier. That same year, Basham and his son Jason made ARCA history by becoming the first father/son duo to finish in the top-20 in the standings the same year.

In 2011, Basham competed in all nineteen races, having a best finish of twelfth at Salem Speedway and finishing tenth in the season point standings. He also won the Spirit Award for the second time.

Basham made his 300th career ARCA start at Lucas Oil Raceway at Indianapolis in 2012, finishing 21st in the event. He had a best finish of 14th place that season at Winchester Speedway, and ultimately finished eleventh in the points standings. He was awarded the Marcum Award at the Championship Awards Banquet for his positive efforts and contributions within the ARCA Racing community.

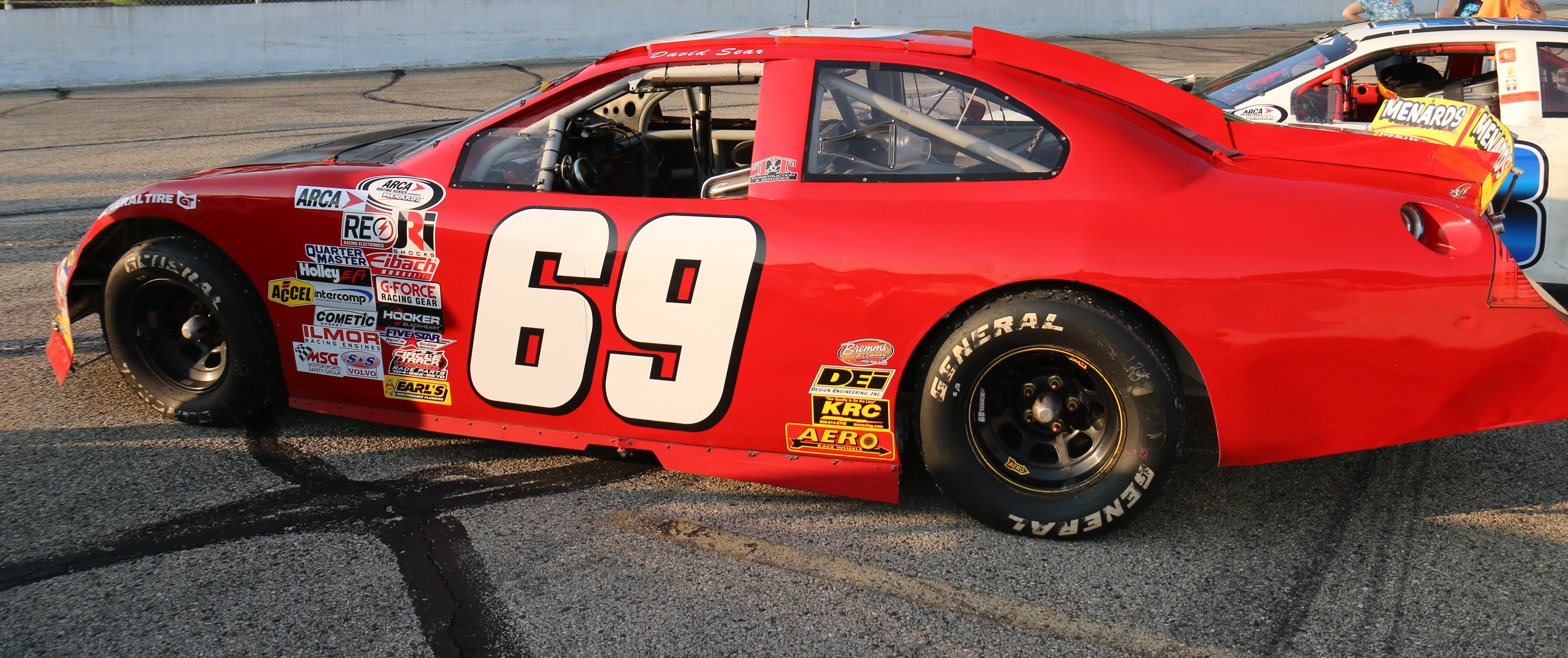
2018 ARCA car at Madison

After racing a full schedule in the ARCA Racing Series for the previous eleven seasons, the then-63-year-old Basham decided to reduce his schedule for the 2013 season and only compete on short tracks. Basham would run seventeen more races between 2014 and 2019. He did not make any starts for the next three years, but returned to the series for the 2023 season finale at Toledo, driving the No. 11 Ford for Fast Track Racing, where he would finish twelfth, albeit nineteen laps down to race winner William Sawalich.

=== NASCAR ===
Basham has competed in a single NASCAR Winston Cup Series event in his career, the 1979 Sun-Drop Music City USA 420 at Nashville Speedway in Nashville, Tennessee. He started and finished 24th in the 28-car field, completing 101 of the race's 420 laps before retiring from the event due to rear end failure. Basham also competed in the NASCAR-sanctioned Goody's Dash Series, a racing formula for four-cylinder subcompact cars, in the early and mid 1990s.

== Personal life ==
Basham has three children. His son Jason competed in 60 ARCA Racing Series events between 2003 and 2013. He also has a son named Mike, who also has competed in ARCA, and a brother named Dugan, who worked as a crew chief for his Darrell's team and also made some ARCA starts.

Basham operates a business as an independent trucker, operating his shop and trucking business from shops attached to his home in Henryville; he builds his own racing engines as well. On March 2, 2012, Basham's race shop was destroyed by a tornado that devastated Henryville; Basham was able to salvage his race cars and other parts to reopen in a garage in Marysville, Indiana, and successfully resumed racing in ARCA, christening his car the Spirit of Henryville.

== Motorsports career results ==
=== Stock car career summary ===
Season	Series	Team	Races	Wins	Top 5	Top 10	Points	Position
1979	ARCA Racing Series	Jim Patrick Racing	3	0	0	2	0	N/A
1979	NASCAR Winston Cup Series	Jim Patrick Racing	1	0	0	0	91	113th
1980	ARCA Racing Series	Jim Patrick Racing	2	0	0	0	0	N/A
1981	ARCA Racing Series	Jim Patrick Racing	4	0	0	2	0	N/A
1982	ARCA Talladega SuperCar Series	Jim Patrick Racing	2	0	0	0	0	N/A
1993	NASCAR Goody's Dash Series	Darrell Basham Racing	1	0	0	0	0	N/A
1994	ARCA Hooters SuperCar Series	N/A	2	0	0	0	0	N/A
1995	NASCAR Goody's Dash Series	Darrell Basham Racing	3	0	0	0	204	49th
1996	ARCA Bondo/Mar-Hyde Series	Darrell Basham Racing	2	0	0	0	0	N/A
1997	ARCA Bondo/Mar-Hyde Series	Darrell Basham Racing	4	0	0	0	0	N/A
1999	ARCA Bondo Mar-Hyde Series	Darrell Basham Racing	2	0	0	0	170	97th
2000	ARCA Bondo/Mar-Hyde Series	Darrell Basham Racing	1	0	0	0	70	135th
2001	ARCA Re/Max Series	Darrell Basham Racing	15	0	0	0	2905	12th
2002	ARCA Re/Max Series	Darrell Basham Racing	22	0	0	0	3565	15th
2003	ARCA Re/Max Series	Darrell Basham Racing	22	0	0	1	3770	14th
2004	ARCA Re/Max Series	Darrell Basham Racing	22	0	0	0	4280	11th
2005	ARCA Re/Max Series	Darrell Basham Racing	22	0	0	1	4000	12th
2006	ARCA Re/Max Series	Darrell Basham Racing	23	0	0	0	3960	13th
2007	ARCA Re/Max Series	Darrell Basham Racing	22	0	0	0	3470	15th
2008	ARCA Re/Max Series	Darrell Basham Racing	21	0	0	0	3565	15th
2009	ARCA Re/Max Series	Darrell Basham Racing	21	0	0	2	3710	12th
2010	ARCA Racing Series	Darrell Basham Racing	20	0	0	0	3425	14th
2011	ARCA Racing Series	Darrell Basham Racing	19	0	0	0	3310	10th
2012	ARCA Racing Series	Darrell Basham Racing	19	0	0	0	3065	11th
2013	ARCA Racing Series	Darrell Basham Racing	15	0	0	0	2390	14th
2014	ARCA Racing Series	James Hylton Motorsports	2	0	0	0	875	30th
2014	ARCA Racing Series	Darrell Basham Racing	5	0	0	0	875	30th
2015	ARCA Racing Series	Darrell Basham Racing	3	0	0	0	415	54th
2017	ARCA Racing Series	Hixson Motorsports	1	0	0	0	115	107th
2018	ARCA Racing Series	Kimmel Racing	1	0	0	0	565	35th
2018	ARCA Racing Series	Darrell Basham Racing	1	0	0	0	565	35th
2018	ARCA Racing Series	Fast Track Racing	1	0	0	0	565	35th
2018	ARCA Racing Series	Dale Shearer Racing	1	0	0	0	565	35th
2019	ARCA Menards Series	Darrell Basham Racing	1	0	0	0	290	58th
2019	ARCA Menards Series	Fast Track Racing	1	0	0	0	290	58th
2023	ARCA Menards Series	Fast Track Racing	1	0	0	0	32	89th

=== NASCAR ===
(key) (Bold – Pole position awarded by qualifying time. Italics – Pole position earned by points standings or practice time. * – Most laps led.)

==== Winston Cup Series ====
NASCAR Winston Cup Series results
Year	Team	No.	Make	1	2	3	4	5	6	7	8	9	10	11	12	13	14	15	16	17	18	19	20	21	22	23	24	25	26	27	28	29	30	31	NWCC	Pts	Ref
1979	Jim Patrick Racing	34	Mercury	RSD	DAY	CAR	RCH	ATL	NWS	BRI	DAR	MAR	TAL	NSV; 24	DOV	CLT	TWS	RSD	MCH	DAY	NSV	POC	TAL	MCH	BRI	DAR	RCH	DOV	MAR	CLT	NWS	CAR	ATL	ONT	113th	91	

==== Goody's Dash Series ====
NASCAR Goody's Dash Series results
Year	Team	No.	Make	1	2	3	4	5	6	7	8	9	10	11	12	13	14	15	16	17	18	19	NGDS	Pts	Ref
1993	Darrell Basham Racing	34	Chevy	DAY; 17	NSV	SUM	VOL	MAR	LON	411	LAN	HCY	SUM	FLO	BGS	MYB	NRV	HCY	VOL				N/A	0	
1995	Darrell Basham Racing	34	Chevy	DAY; 36	FLO	LAN	MYB	SUM	HCY	CAR	STH	BRI	SUM	GRE	BGS	MYB	NSV; 28	FLO	NWS	VOL	HCY	HOM; 31	49th	204	

=== ARCA Menards Series ===
(key) (Bold – Pole position awarded by qualifying time. Italics – Pole position earned by points standings or practice time. * – Most laps led.)

ARCA Menards Series results
Year	Team	No.	Make	1	2	3	4	5	6	7	8	9	10	11	12	13	14	15	16	17	18	19	20	21	22	23	24	25	AMSC	Pts	Ref
1979	Jim Patrick Racing	34	Mercury	AVS; 9	DAY	NSV; 8	FRS; 11	SLM	DSP	IMS	TAL	FRS																	NA	0	
1980	Jim Patrick Racing	34	Mercury	DAY; 18	NWS	FRS	FRS	MCH	TAL; 29	IMS	FRS	MCH																	NA	0	
1981	Jim Patrick Racing	34	Mercury	DAY; DNQ	DSP; 16	FRS	FRS; 9	BFS; 9	TAL; 27	FRS	COR																		18th	285	
1982	Jim Patrick Racing	34	Mercury	NSV	DAY	TAL	FRS	CMS; 13	WIN; 24	NSV	TAT	TAL	FRS	BFS	MIL	SND													NA	0	
1994		50	Pontiac	DAY	TAL	FIF	LVL	KIL	TOL	FRS	MCH	DMS	POC	POC	KIL	FRS	INF; 39	I70	ISF										NA	0	
1994		5	Pontiac																	DSF; 17	TOL	SLM	WIN	ATL					NA	0	
1996	Darrell Basham Racing	34	Pontiac	DAY	ATL	SLM	TAL	FIF	LVL	CLT	CLT	KIL	FRS	POC	MCH	FRS	TOL	POC	MCH	INF	SBS	ISF	DSF	KIL	SLM; 27	WIN; 24	CLT	ATL	NA	0	
1997	Darrell Basham Racing	34	Pontiac	DAY	ATL	SLM; 23	CLT	CLT	POC	MCH	SBS	TOL	KIL	FRS	MIN	POC	MCH	DSF	GTW	SLM; 11	WIN; 26	CLT	TAL	ISF; 20	ATL				NA	0	
1999	Darrell Basham Racing	34	Pontiac	DAY	ATL	SLM; 28	AND	CLT	MCH	POC	TOL	SBS	BLN	POC	KIL	FRS	FLM	ISF	WIN	DSF	SLM; 30	CLT	TAL	ATL					97th	170	
2000	Darrell Basham Racing	34	Chevy	DAY	SLM	AND	CLT	KIL	FRS	MCH	POC	TOL	KEN	BLN	POC	WIN	ISF	KEN	DSF	SLM; 32	CLT	TAL	ATL						135th	70	
2001	Darrell Basham Racing	34	Chevy	DAY	NSH	WIN	SLM; 11	GTY	KEN; 28	CLT	KAN	MCH	POC; 25	MEM	GLN; 33	KEN; 18	MCH	POC; 19	NSH; 12	ISF; 22	CHI; 17	DSF	SLM; 15	TOL; 14	BLN; 19	CLT; 31	TAL; 27	ATL; 18	12th	2905	
2002	Darrell Basham Racing	34	Chevy	DAY; 41	ATL; 14	NSH; 27		KEN; 20	CLT; 28	KAN; 27	POC; 24	MCH; 25	TOL; 13	SBO; 14	KEN; 35	BLN; 21	POC; 21	NSH; 28	ISF; 34	WIN; 18	DSF; 40	CHI; 14	SLM; 22	TAL; 20	CLT; 33				15th	3565	
2002	Darrell Basham Racing	50	Chevy				SLM; 31																						15th	3565	
2003	Darrell Basham Racing	34	Chevy	DAY; 22	ATL; 21	NSH; 26	SLM; 34	TOL; 14	KEN; 22	CLT; 29	BLN; 22	KAN; 10	MCH; 22	LER; 27	POC; 26	POC; 38	NSH; 26	ISF; 13	WIN; 20	DSF; 13	CHI; 23	SLM; 13	TAL; 40	CLT; 34	SBO; 18				14th	3770	
2004	Darrell Basham Racing	34	Chevy	DAY; 24	NSH; 20	SLM; 11	KEN; 14	TOL; 19		KAN; 19	POC; 13	MCH; 26	SBO; 13	BLN; 17	KEN; 24	GTW; 15	POC; 15	LER; 14	NSH; 23	ISF; 14	TOL; 22	DSF; 25	CHI; 16	SLM; 19	TAL; 17				11th	4280	
2004	Darrell Basham Racing	34	Ford						CLT; 26																				11th	4280	
2005	Darrell Basham Racing	34	Chevy	DAY; DNQ	NSH; 24	SLM; 16	KEN; 28	TOL; 19	LAN; 16	MIL; 24					BLN; 16			LER; 16			ISF; 16	TOL; 26	DSF; 20	CHI; 22	SLM; 17	TAL; 17			12th	4000	
2005	Darrell Basham Racing	34	Pontiac								POC; 14	MCH; 37	KAN; 7	KEN; 37		POC; 16	GTW; 21		NSH; 18	MCH; 40									12th	4000	
2006	Darrell Basham Racing	34	Chevy	DAY; 18		SLM; 12	WIN; 29		TOL; 32	POC; 17	MCH; 29			BLN; 18					ISF; 17		TOL; 20	DSF; 20		SLM; 22	TAL; 21				13th	3960	
2006	Darrell Basham Racing	34	Pontiac		NSH; 34			KEN; 30				KAN; 29	KEN; 21		POC; 18	GTW; 20	NSH; 18	MCH; 28		MIL; 21			CHI; 24			IOW; 18			13th	3960	
2007	Darrell Basham Racing	34	Chevy	DAY; 18	USA; 19		SLM; 23		WIN; 12		TOL; 26	IOW; 27			BLN; 19				ISF; 20	MIL; 17	GTW; 31	DSF; 32		SLM; 27	TAL; DNQ	TOL; 19			15th	3470	
2007	Darrell Basham Racing	34	Pontiac			NSH; 28		KAN; 28		KEN; 26			POC; 33	MCH; 28		KEN; 31	POC; 35	NSH; 37					CHI; 37						15th	3470	
2008	Darrell Basham Racing	34	Chevy	DAY; 14	SLM; 16	IOW; 23	KAN; 35	CAR; 22	KEN; 35	TOL; 15	POC; 16	MCH; 33	CAY; 20	KEN; 27	BLN; 22	POC; 25	NSH; 27	ISF; 26	DSF; 21	CHI; 41	SLM; 14	NJE; 23	TAL; 17	TOL; 32					15th	3565	
2009	Darrell Basham Racing	34	Chevy	DAY; 9	SLM; 25	CAR; 36	TAL; 20	KEN; 23	TOL; 10	POC; 22	MCH; 34	MFD; 18	IOW; 22		BLN; 21	POC; 23	ISF; 19	CHI; 29	TOL; 21	DSF; 12	NJE; 20	SLM; 19	KAN; 35	CAR; 30					12th	3710	
2009	Darrell Basham Racing	31	Chevy											KEN; 26															12th	3710	
2010	Darrell Basham Racing	34	Chevy	DAY; 22	PBE; 25	SLM; 15	TEX; 27	TAL; 20	TOL; 11	POC; 24	MCH; 25	IOW; 33	MFD; 18	POC; 28	BLN; 20	NJE; 18	ISF; 19	CHI; 20	DSF; 18	TOL; 22	SLM; 16	KAN; 23	CAR; 31						14th	3425	
2011	Darrell Basham Racing	34	Ford	DAY; 25																									10th	3310	
2011	Darrell Basham Racing	34	Chevy		TAL; 31	SLM; 12	TOL; 21	NJE; 26	CHI; 17	POC; 27	MCH; 33	WIN; 19	BLN; 20	IOW; 21	IRP; 15	POC; 29	ISF; 14	MAD; 20	DSF; 23	SLM; 14	KAN; 25	TOL; 20							10th	3310	
2012	Darrell Basham Racing	34	Chevy	DAY; 27		SLM; 17	TAL; 23	TOL; 35	ELK; 19	POC; 24	MCH; 28	WIN; 14	NJE; 23	IOW; 22	CHI; 28	IRP; 21	POC; 28	BLN; 18	ISF; 21	MAD; 25	SLM; 17	DSF; C	KAN; 36						11th	3065	
2012	Darrell Basham Racing	34	Ford		MOB; 35																								11th	3065	
2013	Darrell Basham Racing	34	Chevy	DAY	MOB	SLM	TAL; 23	TOL; 19	ELK; 15	POC; 22	MCH; 25	ROA; 24	WIN; 11	CHI; 19	NJE; 23	POC; 27	BLN; 19	ISF	MAD	DSF	IOW; 22	SLM; 15	KEN; 22	KAN; 26					14th	2390	
2014	James Hylton Motorsports	48	Ford	DAY	MOB; 22	SLM; 23	TAL	TOL																					30th	875	
2014	Darrell Basham Racing	34	Chevy						NJE; 19	POC; 20	MCH; 23	ELK	WIN	CHI	IRP	POC	BLN	ISF	MAD	DSF	SLM; 15	KEN; 25	KAN						30th	875	
2015	Darrell Basham Racing	34	Chevy	DAY	MOB	NSH	SLM; 14	TAL	TOL	NJE	POC	MCH	CHI	WIN	IOW	IRP	POC	BLN	ISF	DSF	SLM; 20	KEN; 21	KAN						54th	415	
2017	Hixson Motorsports	3	Chevy	DAY	NSH	SLM	TAL	TOL	ELK	POC	MCH	MAD	IOW	IRP	POC	WIN	ISF	ROA	DSF	SLM; 23	CHI	KEN	KAN						107th	115	
2018	Kimmel Racing	69	Ford	DAY	NSH	SLM	TAL	TOL	CLT	POC	MCH	MAD; 19	GTW	CHI															35th	565	
2018	Darrell Basham Racing	34	Chevy												IOW; 14														35th	565	
2018	Fast Track Racing	10	Toyota													ELK; 18	BLN	POC	ISF										35th	565	
2018	Dale Shearer Racing	73	Ford																	DSF; 20	IRP	SLM	KAN						35th	565	
2019	Darrell Basham Racing	34	Chevy	DAY	FIF	SLM; 13	TAL	NSH	TOL	CLT	POC	MCH	MAD	GTW	CHI	ELK	IOW	POC	ISF	DSF	SLM								58th	290	
2019	Fast Track Racing	1	Toyota																			IRP; 21	KAN						58th	290	
2023	Fast Track Racing	11	Ford	DAY	PHO	TAL	KAN	CLT	BLN	ELK	MOH	IOW	POC	MCH	IRP	GLN	ISF	MLW	DSF	KAN	BRI	SLM	TOL; 12						89th	32	
