= Mike Basham (racing driver) =

American racing driver (born 1968)

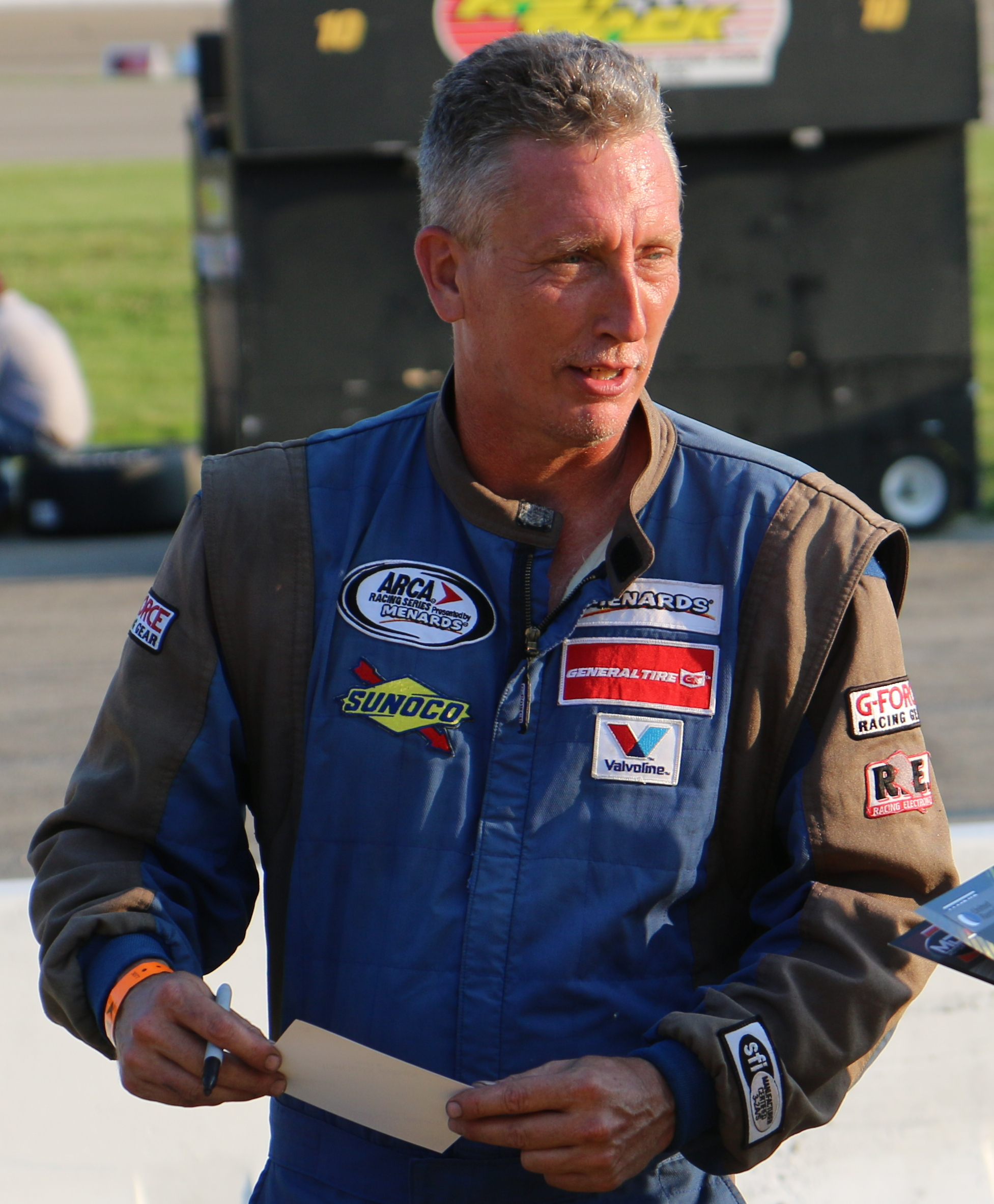
- Basham at Madison International Speedway in 2018
- Born: June 20, 1968 (age 58); Henryville, Indiana, U.S.

ARCA Menards Series career
- 103 races run over 14 years
- Best finish: 8th (2020)
- First race: 2002 Gateway ARCA 150 (Gateway)
- Last race: 2026 Spruce 212 (Salem)
Wins	Top tens	Poles
0	4	0

ARCA Menards Series East career
- 13 races run over 5 years
- Best finish: 21st (2020)
- First race: 2020 Herr's Potato Chips 200 (Toledo)
- Last race: 2026 Rockingham ARCA Menards Series East 125 (Rockingham)
Wins	Top tens	Poles
0	1	0
- Statistics up to date as of September 12, 2026.

Mike Basham (born June 20, 1968) is an American professional stock car racing driver. He last competed part-time in the ARCA Menards Series East, driving the No. 11 Ford for Fast Track Racing. He is the son of long time ARCA Menards Series driver Darrell Basham.

== Racing career ==
In 2001, Basham would make his debut in the ARCA Re/Max Series at Gateway, driving the No. 34 Chevrolet for father Darrell's family owned team, finishing 28th due to overheating issues. He would make four more starts during the year with a best finish of 22nd at the DuQuoin State Fairgrounds dirt track. Basham would run three more races over the next two years spitting between driving for his family owned team and Brad Smith's team.

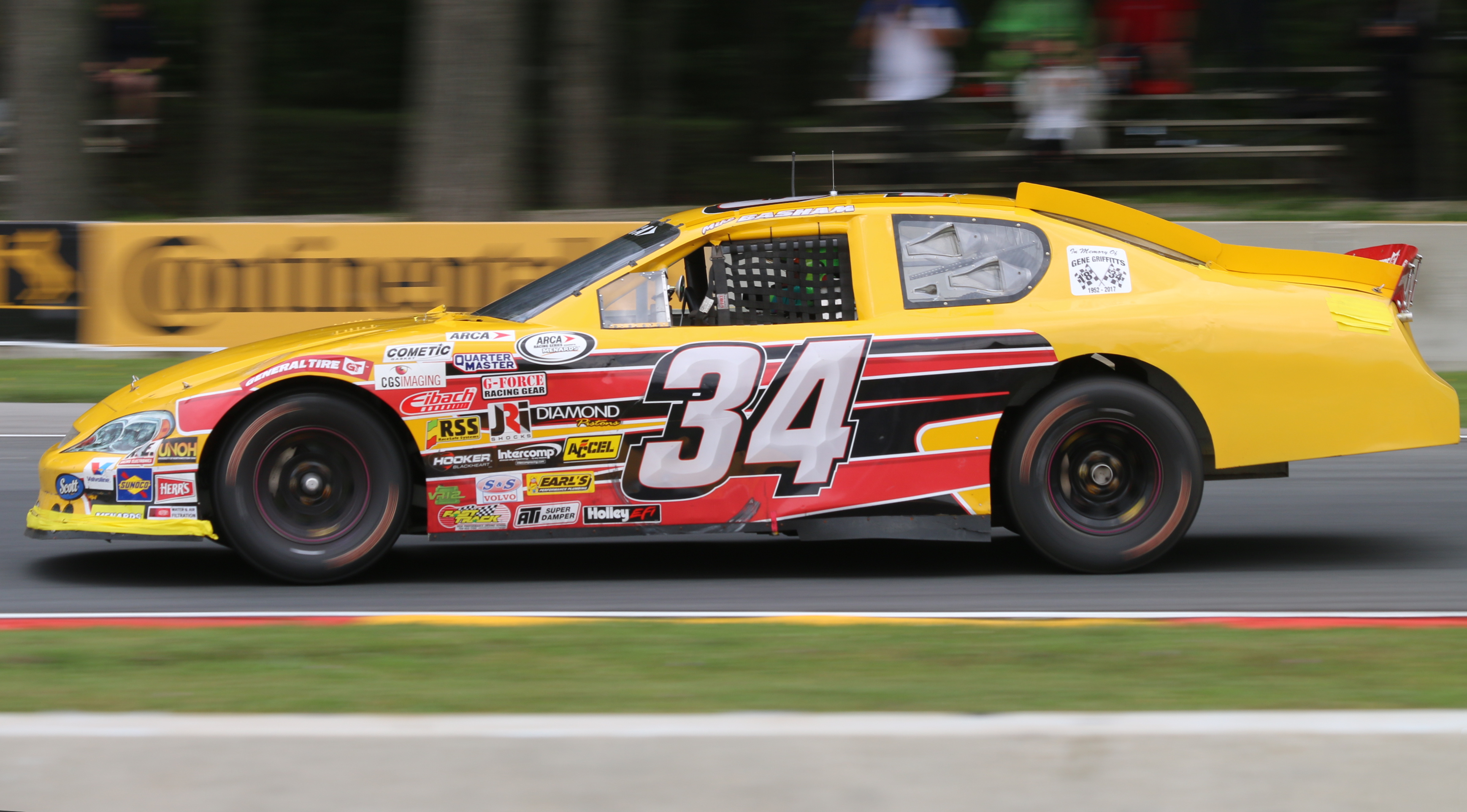
Basham's No. 34 ARCA car at Road America in 2017

After spending twelve years on the sidelines, Basham would return to the series in 2015, driving in three races for Darrell Basham Racing in the No. 34 with a best finish of fifteenth at the Illinois State Fairgrounds dirt track. It was also during this year that he would run select races in the Indiana Late Model Series, where he would finish tenth in points with a best finish of sixth at Movieland Speedpark. He would return in 2016, running a majority of the schedule with the same family owned team, this time in collaboration with Mullins Racing, where he would finish tenth in the points standings with a best finish of tenth at Springfield. He would remain with the team for 2017, finishing thirteenth in the final points standings with a best finish of thirteenth at Winchester Speedway and Salem Speedway. For 2018, in addition to running with the same teams before, Basham also ran for Kimmel Racing for the first Pocono Raceway race that year, finishing 28th due to overheating issues. He would once again place thirteenth in the standings with a best finish of eleventh at Elko Speedway.

Prior to the 2019 season, Basham stated that he had no plans to compete in the series. He would eventually split time between Fast Track Racing, Kimmel Racing, and Darrell Basham Racing, where he would finish the season seventeenth in the standings having run only ten races in the schedule, with a best finish of thirteenth at Lucas Oil Raceway and Salem.

In 2020, Basham would return to Fast Track Racing driving for a majority of the races that season, including a collaboration with Fast Track and Chad Bryant Racing at the Kansas Speedway finale in the No. 77 Ford, where he would finish twelfth, albeit nine laps down. Throughout that year, Basham would achieve three top-ten finishes, including a career-best finish of sixth at Springfield, and finished a career-best eighth in the standings. In addition, Basham would also run in three ARCA Menards Series East starts in combination races with the main ARCA Menards Series with a best finish of twelfth at Toledo Speedway. Basham would return to Fast Track for one race in 2021, running in Berlin Raceway, where he would finish sixteenth due to handling issues.

In 2023, it was revealed that Basham would return to the series at Lucas Oil Indianapolis Raceway Park, driving for Kimmel Racing in the No. 69 Ford. After placing thirteenth in the sole practice session, he would go on to qualify in seventeenth, but would finish 24th after running eleven laps due to brake issues. It was also revealed a month later that Basham would run for the team at Bristol Motor Speedway, where he would start 28th and finish 32nd after running nine laps due to mechanical issues. He ran the season finale at Toledo, where he would only complete eleven laps before retiring from the event, finishing seventeenth.

In 2024, it was revealed that Basham would drive the No. 10 Ford for Fast Track Racing at the season opening race for the ARCA Menards Series East at Five Flags Speedway. After placing twelfth in the lone practice session, he qualified in tenth and finished in sixth place, albeit five laps down to race winner Gio Ruggiero.

== Personal life ==
Basham is the older brother of Jason Basham, who has previously competed in ARCA from 2003 to 2013. He is also the son of Darrell Basham.

== Motorsports career results ==
=== Stock car career summary ===
Season	Series	Team	Races	Wins	Top 5	Top 10	Points	Position
2001	ARCA Re/Max Series	Darrell Basham Racing	5	0	0	0	445	75th
2002	ARCA Re/Max Series	Brad Smith Motorsports	1	0	0	0	125	143rd
2002	ARCA Re/Max Series	Darrell Basham Racing	1	0	0	0	125	143rd
2003	ARCA Re/Max Series	Darrell Basham Racing	1	0	0	0	60	184th
2015	ARCA Racing Series	Darrell Basham Racing	3	0	0	0	390	61st
2016	ARCA Racing Series	Darrell Basham Racing	17	0	0	1	2925	10th
2017	ARCA Racing Series	Darrell Basham Racing	16	0	0	0	2745	13th
2018	ARCA Racing Series	Darrell Basham Racing	14	0	0	0	2120	13th
2018	ARCA Racing Series	Kimmel Racing	1	0	0	0	2120	13th
2019	ARCA Racing Series	Kimmel Racing	5	0	0	0	1455	17th
2019	ARCA Racing Series	Fast Track Racing	3	0	0	0	1455	17th
2019	ARCA Racing Series	Darrell Basham Racing	2	0	0	0	1455	17th
2020	ARCA Menards Series East	Fast Track Racing	3	0	0	0	83	21st
2020	ARCA Menards Series	Fast Track Racing	14	0	0	3	540	8th
2020	ARCA Menards Series	Chad Bryant Racing	1	0	0	0	540	8th
2021	ARCA Menards Series	Fast Track Racing	1	0	0	0	28	99th
2023	ARCA Menards Series East	Kimmel Racing	2	0	0	0	32	41st
2023	ARCA Menards Series	Kimmel Racing	4	0	0	0	83	43rd
2024	ARCA Menards Series East	Fast Track Racing	2	0	0	1	58	31st
2024	ARCA Menards Series	Fast Track Racing	2	0	0	0	65	58th
2024	ARCA Menards Series	Kimmel Racing	1	0	0	0	65	58th
2025	ARCA Menards Series East	Fast Track Racing	4	0	0	0	109	23rd
2025	ARCA Menards Series East	Shearer Speed Racing	1	0	0	0	109	23rd
2025	ARCA Menards Series	Fast Track Racing	8	0	0	0	198	19th
2025	ARCA Menards Series	Shearer Speed Racing	1	0	0	0	198	19th
2026	ARCA Menards Series East	Fast Track Racing	1	0	0	0	22	62nd
2026	ARCA Menards Series	Fast Track Racing	2	0	0	0	64	66th

=== ARCA Menards Series ===
(key) (Bold – Pole position awarded by qualifying time. Italics – Pole position earned by points standings or practice time. * – Most laps led.)

ARCA Menards Series results
Year	Team	No.	Make	1	2	3	4	5	6	7	8	9	10	11	12	13	14	15	16	17	18	19	20	21	22	23	24	25	AMSC	Pts	Ref
2001	Darrell Basham Racing	34	Chevy	DAY	NSH	WIN	SLM	GTY; 28	KEN	CLT				MEM; 32	GLN	KEN	MCH; 27	POC	NSH	ISF	CHI	DSF; 22	SLM	TOL	BLN	CLT	TAL	ATL	75th	445	
2001	Darrell Basham Racing	34	Pontiac								KAN; 32	MCH	POC																75th	445	
2002	Brad Smith Motorsports	76	Ford	DAY	ATL	NSH	SLM	KEN	CLT	KAN; 34	POC																		143rd	125	
2002	Brad Smith Motorsports	76	Chevy									MCH; DNQ	TOL	SBO	KEN	BLN	POC												143rd	125	
2002	Darrell Basham Racing	3	Chevy															NSH; 38	ISF	WIN	DSF	CHI	SLM	TAL	CLT				143rd	125	
2003	Darrell Basham Racing	94	Chevy	DAY	ATL	NSH; DNQ	SLM	TOL	KEN	CLT	BLN	KAN; 39	MCH	LER	POC	POC	NSH	ISF	WIN	DSF	CHI	SLM	TAL	CLT	SBO				184th	60	
2015	Darrell Basham Racing	34	Chevy	DAY	MOB	NSH	SLM	TAL	TOL	NJE	POC	MCH	CHI	WIN	IOW	IRP	POC	BLN	ISF; 15	DSF; 20	SLM	KEN	KAN; 25						61st	390	
2016	Darrell Basham Racing	34	Chevy	DAY	NSH; 20	SLM; 19	TAL	TOL; 19	NJE	POC; 28	MCH; 22	MAD; 16	WIN; 13	IOW; 21	IRP; 18	POC; 16	BLN; 12	ISF; 10	DSF; 15	SLM; 16	CHI; 18	KEN; 16	KAN; 18						10th	2925	
2017	Darrell Basham Racing	34	Chevy	DAY	NSH	SLM; 16	TAL	TOL; 15	ELK	POC; 23	MCH; 27	MAD; 14	IOW; 16	IRP; 16	POC; 25	WIN; 13	ISF; 15	ROA; 20	DSF; 15	SLM; 13	CHI; 18	KEN; 23	KAN; 18						13th	2745	
2018	Darrell Basham Racing	34	Chevy	DAY	NSH; 26	SLM; 15	TAL	TOL; 15	CLT			MAD; 16	GTW; 23	CHI; 24	IOW	ELK; 11	POC; 18	ISF; 19	BLN; 14	DSF; 19	SLM; 12	IRP; 24	KAN; 24						13th	2120	
2018	Kimmel Racing	69	Ford							POC; 28	MCH																		13th	2120	
2019	Kimmel Racing	69	Ford	DAY	FIF; 20	SLM; 17	TAL		TOL; 16	CLT	POC	MCH	MAD	GTW; 20	CHI			POC; 19											17th	1455	
2019	Fast Track Racing	11	Ford					NSH; 16								ELK; 17	IOW												17th	1455	
2019	Fast Track Racing	11	Toyota																ISF; 18	DSF									17th	1455	
2019	Darrell Basham Racing	34	Chevy																		SLM; 13	IRP; 13	KAN						17th	1455	
2020	Fast Track Racing	11	Toyota	DAY	PHO	TAL	POC	IRP; 19	KEN							GTW; 20				WIN; 7									8th	540	
2020	Fast Track Racing	10	Toyota							IOW; 20		TOL; 14	TOL; 15								MEM; 12	ISF; 6							8th	540	
2020	Fast Track Racing	01	Chevy								KAN; 17																		8th	540	
2020	Fast Track Racing	11	Chevy											MCH; 17															8th	540	
2020	Fast Track Racing	10	Ford												DAY; 15														8th	540	
2020	Fast Track Racing	12	Toyota														I44; 10	TOL; 12											8th	540	
2020	Fast Track Racing	10	Chevy																BRI; 24										8th	540	
2020	Chad Bryant Racing	77	Ford																				KAN; 12						8th	540	
2021	Fast Track Racing	01	Ford	DAY	PHO	TAL	KAN	TOL	CLT	MOH	POC	ELK	BLN; 16	IOW	WIN	GLN	MCH	ISF	MLW	DSF	BRI	SLM	KAN						99th	28	
2023	Kimmel Racing	69	Ford	DAY	PHO	TAL	KAN	CLT	BLN	ELK	MOH	IOW	POC	MCH	IRP; 24	GLN	ISF	MLW	DSF	KAN	BRI; 32		TOL; 17						43rd	85	
2023	Kimmel Racing	68	Ford																			SLM; 18							43rd	85	
2024	Fast Track Racing	12	Toyota	DAY	PHO	TAL	DOV; 24	KAN	CLT	IOW	MOH; 20	BLN	IRP																58th	65	
2024	Kimmel Racing	68	Ford											SLM; 23	ELK	MCH	ISF	MLW	DSF	GLN	BRI	KAN	TOL						58th	65	
2025	Fast Track Racing	11	Ford	DAY	PHO	TAL	KAN; 19	CLT; 30																					19th	198	
2025	Fast Track Racing	12	Ford						MCH; 23	BLN	ELK																		19th	198	
2025	Fast Track Racing	11	Toyota									LRP; 11	DOV																19th	198	
2025	Shearer Speed Racing	98	Toyota											IRP; 24			ISF; Wth	MAD	DSF										19th	198	
2025	Fast Track Racing	9	Toyota												IOW; 25	GLN													19th	198	
2025	Fast Track Racing	01	Toyota																	BRI; 34									19th	198	
2025	Fast Track Racing	12	Toyota																		SLM; 12	KAN							19th	198	
2025	Fast Track Racing	10	Ford																				TOL; 20						19th	198	
2026	Fast Track Racing	11	Ford	DAY	PHO	KAN	TAL	GLN	TOL	MCH	POC	BER	ELK	CHI	LRP	IRP	IOW	ISF	MAD; 13	DSF									66th	64	
2026	Fast Track Racing	11	Toyota																		SLM; 11	BRI	KAN						66th	64	

==== ARCA Menards Series East ====
ARCA Menards Series East results
Year	Team	No.	Make	1	2	3	4	5	6	7	8	AMSEC	Pts	Ref
2020	Fast Track Racing	11	Toyota	NSM	TOL; 13	DOV						21st	83	
2020	Fast Track Racing	12	Toyota				TOL; 12					21st	83	
2020	Fast Track Racing	10	Chevy					BRI; 24	FIF			21st	83	
2023	Kimmel Racing	69	Ford	FIF	DOV	NSV	FRS	IOW	IRP; 24	MLW	BRI; 32	41st	32	
2024	Fast Track Racing	10	Ford	FIF; 6								31st	58	
2024	Fast Track Racing	12	Toyota		DOV; 24	NSV	FRS	IOW	IRP	MLW	BRI	31st	58	
2025	Fast Track Racing	10	Ford	FIF; 13	CAR							23rd	109	
2025	Fast Track Racing	9	Ford			NSV; 15	FRS	DOV				23rd	109	
2025	Shearer Speed Racing	98	Toyota						IRP; 24			23rd	109	
2025	Fast Track Racing	9	Toyota							IOW; 25		23rd	109	
2025	Fast Track Racing	01	Toyota								BRI; 34	23rd	109	
2026	Fast Track Racing	11	Ford	HCY	CAR; 22	NSV	TOL	IRP	FRS	IOW	BRI	62nd	22	
