= Jeremy Barham =

British hockey player

Personal information
- Born: 27 February 1941 (age 85) Royal Tunbridge Wells, England
- Height: 181 cm (5 ft 11 in)
- Weight: 67 kg (148 lb)

Sport
- Sport: Field hockey
- Position: Forward
Senior career
Years	Team	Caps	Goals
1962–1974	Dulwich	-	-
National team
Years	Team	Caps	Goals
–	Great Britain		-
–	England		-

Jeremy Gavin Barham (born 27 February 1941) is a British former field hockey player who competed at the 1968 Summer Olympics.

== Biography ==
Barham was educated at Cranbrook School, Kent and Cambridge University.

He played club hockey for Dulwich Hockey Club and was a member of the England U23 side in 1963.

Barham represented Great Britain at the 1968 Olympic Games in Mexico City in the men's tournament.
