= 2013 ARCA Racing Series =

61st season of the ARCA Racing Series

Seasons
- ← 2012 2014 →

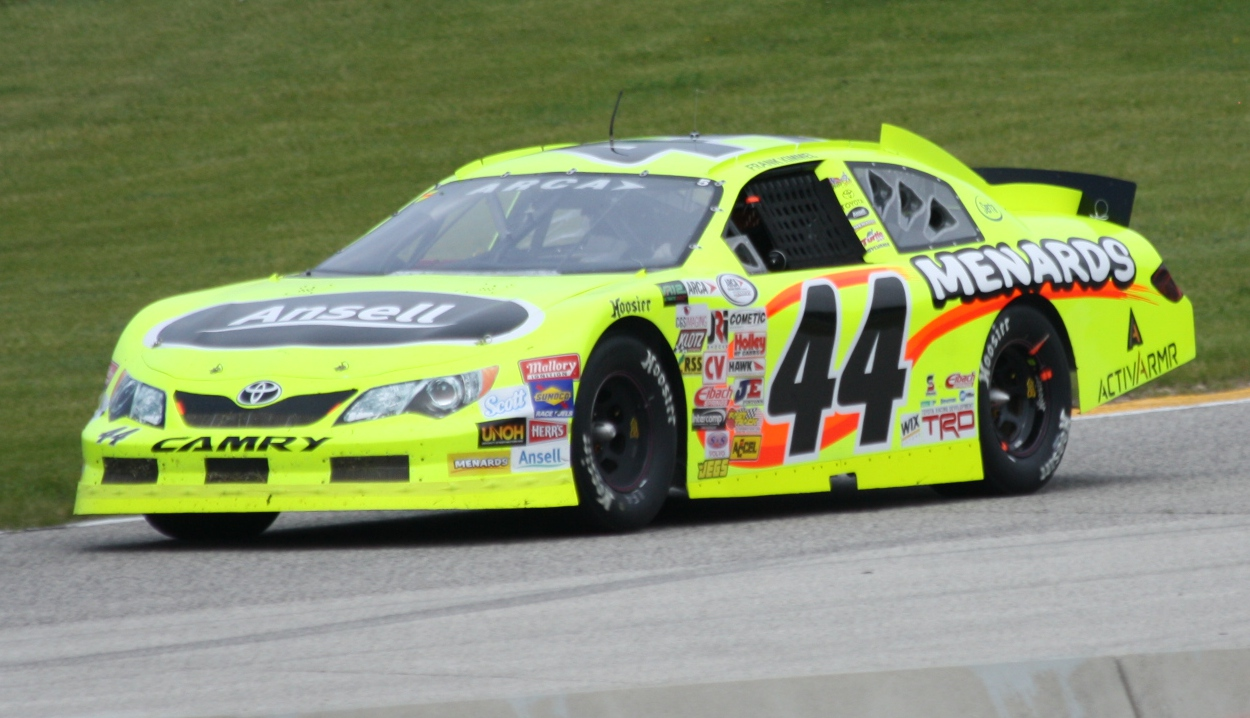
Frank Kimmel, driving the No. 44 car for ThorSport Racing, the 2013 ARCA champion. This was his tenth and final title in the series.

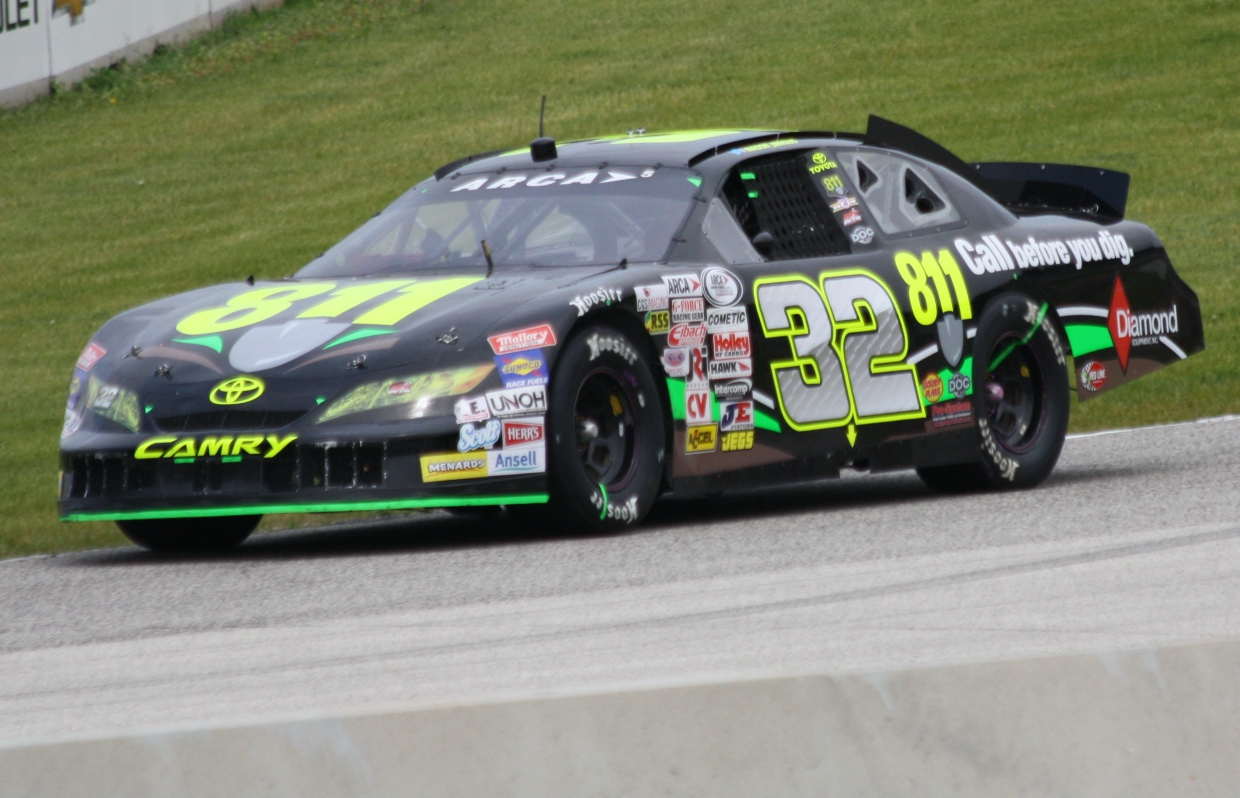
Mason Mingus, driving the No. 32 car for Win-Tron Racing, finished second behind Kimmel in the championship by 365 points.

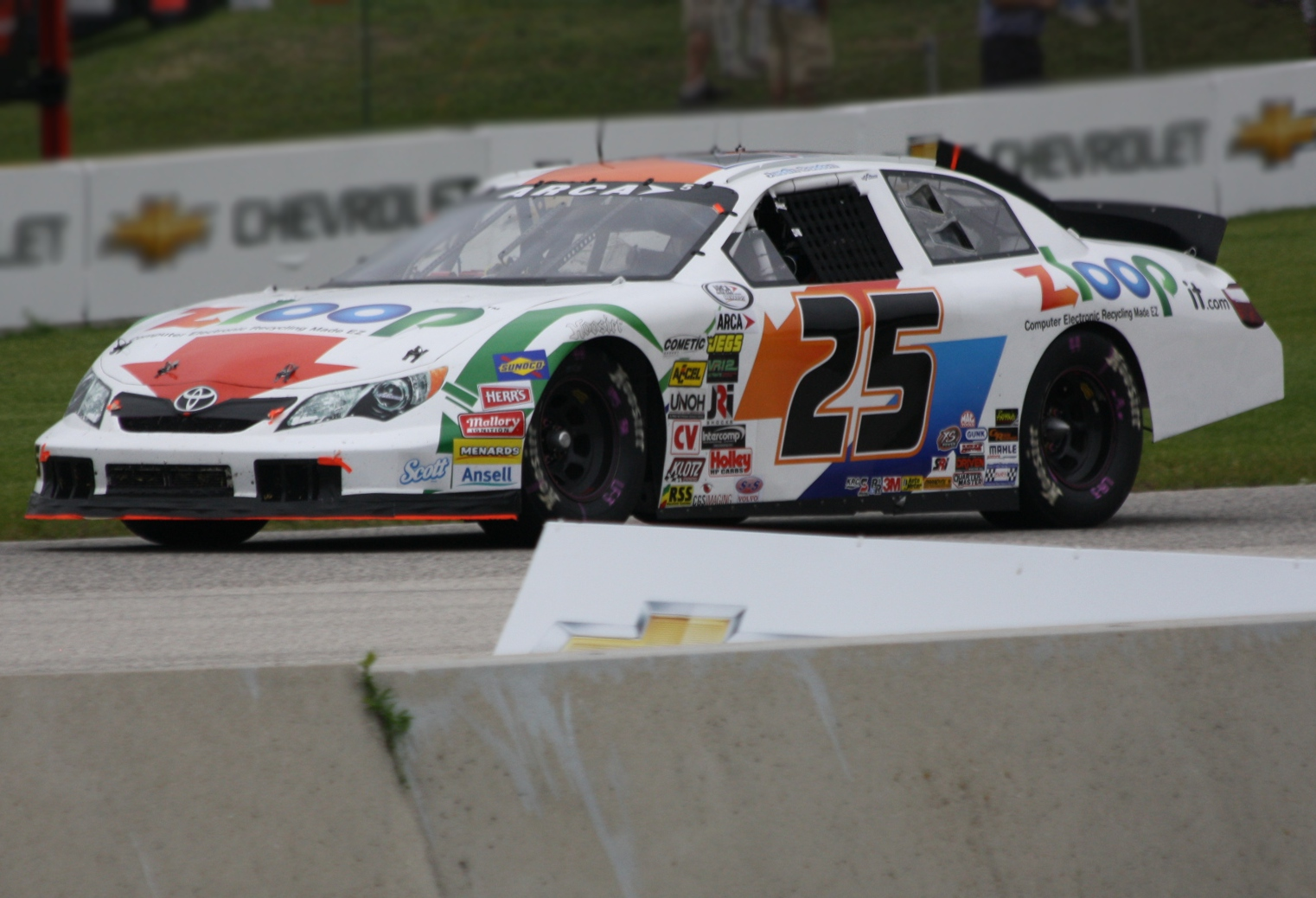
Justin Boston, driving the No. 25 car for Venturini Motorsports, finished third in the championship.

The 2013 ARCA Racing Series presented by Menards was the 61st season of the ARCA Racing Series. The season began on February 16 with the Lucas Oil 200 presented by MAVTV American Real and ended on October 4 with the Kansas ARCA 150. James Hylton retired from driving at the end of the season at the age of 79. Frank Kimmel of ThorSport Racing won the driver's championship, his tenth in the series.

== Teams and drivers ==
=== Complete schedule ===
| Manufacturer | Team | No. | Driver |
|---|---|---|---|
| Chevrolet | Fast Track Racing 2 Darrell Basham Racing 19 | 34 | Rick Clifton 1 (Note: It was a Fast Track Racing entry using Darrell Basham Racing's owner points.) |
| Chevrolet | Fast Track Racing 2 Darrell Basham Racing 19 | 34 | Tyler Speer 1 (Note: It was a Fast Track Racing entry using Darrell Basham Racing's owner points.) |
| Chevrolet | Fast Track Racing 2 Darrell Basham Racing 19 | 34 | Jason Basham 4 |
| Chevrolet | Fast Track Racing 2 Darrell Basham Racing 19 | 34 | Darrell Basham 15 |
| Chevrolet | Gallagher Motorsports | 23 | Spencer Gallagher 20 |
| Chevrolet | Gallagher Motorsports | 23 | Josh Williams 1 |
| Dodge | Carter 2 Motorsports | 40 | Galen Hassler 2 |
| Dodge | Carter 2 Motorsports | 40 | Nick Tucker 2 |
| Dodge | Carter 2 Motorsports | 40 | Cody Lane 2 |
| Dodge | Carter 2 Motorsports | 40 | Mark Meunier 4 |
| Dodge | Carter 2 Motorsports | 40 | Dominick Casola 6 |
| Dodge | Carter 2 Motorsports | 40 | Korbin Forrister 1 |
| Dodge | Carter 2 Motorsports | 40 | Justin Lloyd 2 |
| Dodge | Carter 2 Motorsports | 40 | Joseph Hughs 1 |
| Dodge | Carter 2 Motorsports | 40 | David Sear 1 |
| Dodge | Carter 2 Motorsports | 97 | Roger Carter (R) 20 |
| Dodge | Carter 2 Motorsports | 97 | Nick Tucker 1 |
| Dodge | Cunningham Motorsports | 22 | Michel Disdier |
| Dodge | Cunningham Motorsports | 22 | Anderson Bowen |
| Dodge | Cunningham Motorsports | 22 | Korbin Forrister |
| Dodge | Cunningham Motorsports | 22 | Austin Wayne Self |
| Dodge | Cunningham Motorsports | 22 | Jonathan Eilen |
| Dodge | Cunningham Motorsports | 22 | Will Kimmel |
| Dodge | Cunningham Motorsports | 22 | Ryan Blaney |
| Dodge | Cunningham Motorsports | 22 | Justin South |
| Dodge | Cunningham Motorsports | 22 | Tyler Reddick |
| Dodge | Cunningham Motorsports | 22 | Scott Lagasse Jr. |
| Dodge | Cunningham Motorsports | 77 | Tom Hessert III |
| Ford | Hylton Motorsports | 48 | James Hylton |
| Ford | Roulo Brothers Racing 16; Corey LaJoie Racing 5 | 17 | Chris Buescher 1 |
| Ford | Roulo Brothers Racing 16; Corey LaJoie Racing 5 | 17 | Zach Ralston 1 |
| Ford | Roulo Brothers Racing 16; Corey LaJoie Racing 5 | 17 | Dave Savicki 5 |
| Ford | Roulo Brothers Racing 16; Corey LaJoie Racing 5 | 17 | Dennis Strickland 1 |
| Ford | Roulo Brothers Racing 16; Corey LaJoie Racing 5 | 17 | Josh Williams 1 |
| Ford | Roulo Brothers Racing 16; Corey LaJoie Racing 5 | 17 | Mason Mitchell (R) 1 |
| Ford | Roulo Brothers Racing 16; Corey LaJoie Racing 5 | 17 | Corey LaJoie 5 |
| Ford | Roulo Brothers Racing 16; Corey LaJoie Racing 5 | 17 | George Cushman 1 |
| Ford | Roulo Brothers Racing 16; Corey LaJoie Racing 5 | 17 | Brad Smith 1 |
| Ford | Roulo Brothers Racing 16; Corey LaJoie Racing 5 | 17 | Chris Windom 1 |
| Ford | Roulo Brothers Racing 16; Corey LaJoie Racing 5 | 17 | D. J. Weltmeyer 1 |
| Ford | Roulo Brothers Racing 16; Corey LaJoie Racing 5 | 17 | Kyle Hadley 1 |
| Toyota | ThorSport Racing | 44 | Frank Kimmel |
| Toyota | Venturini Motorsports | 25 | Justin Boston (R) |
| Toyota 18 Chevrolet 3 | Venturini Motorsports | 15 | John Wes Townley 3 |
| Toyota 18 Chevrolet 3 | Venturini Motorsports | 15 | Kyle Benjamin 8 |
| Toyota 18 Chevrolet 3 | Venturini Motorsports | 15 | Erik Jones 4 |
| Toyota 18 Chevrolet 3 | Venturini Motorsports | 15 | Brennan Poole 3 |
| Toyota 18 Chevrolet 3 | Venturini Motorsports | 15 | A. J. Henriksen 1 |
| Toyota 18 Chevrolet 3 | Venturini Motorsports | 15 | Caleb Armstrong 1 |
| Toyota 18 Chevrolet 3 | Venturini Motorsports | 15 | Nelson Canache Jr. 1 |
| Toyota 18 Chevrolet 3 | Venturini Motorsports | 35 | Milka Duno (R) |
| Toyota 19 Chevrolet 2 | Venturini Motorsports | 55 | Bubba Wallace 1 |
| Toyota 19 Chevrolet 2 | Venturini Motorsports | 55 | Taylor Ferns 8 |
| Toyota 19 Chevrolet 2 | Venturini Motorsports | 55 | John Wes Townley 2 |
| Toyota 19 Chevrolet 2 | Venturini Motorsports | 55 | Caleb Armstrong 2 |
| Toyota 19 Chevrolet 2 | Venturini Motorsports | 55 | A. J. Henriksen 2 |
| Toyota 19 Chevrolet 2 | Venturini Motorsports | 55 | Chad Boat 1 |
| Toyota 19 Chevrolet 2 | Venturini Motorsports | 55 | Brennan Poole 2 |
| Toyota 19 Chevrolet 2 | Venturini Motorsports | 55 | Brian Wong 1 |
| Toyota 19 Chevrolet 2 | Venturini Motorsports | 55 | Clint King 1 |
| Toyota 19 Chevrolet 2 | Venturini Motorsports | 55 | Dylan Kwasniewski 1 |
| Chevrolet 8 Ford 13 | Wayne Peterson Racing | 06 | Dexter Stacey 1 (Note: It was a Mike Harmon Racing entry using Wayne Peterson Racing's owner points.) |
| Chevrolet 8 Ford 13 | Wayne Peterson Racing | 06 | James Swanson (R) 17 |
| Chevrolet 8 Ford 13 | Wayne Peterson Racing | 06 | Chris Bailey Jr. 1 |
| Chevrolet 8 Ford 13 | Wayne Peterson Racing | 06 | Wayne Peterson 2 |
| Toyota 17 Chevrolet 4 | Win-Tron Racing | 32 | Mason Mingus (R) |

=== Limited schedule ===
THIS TABLE IS COMING SOON

== Schedule ==
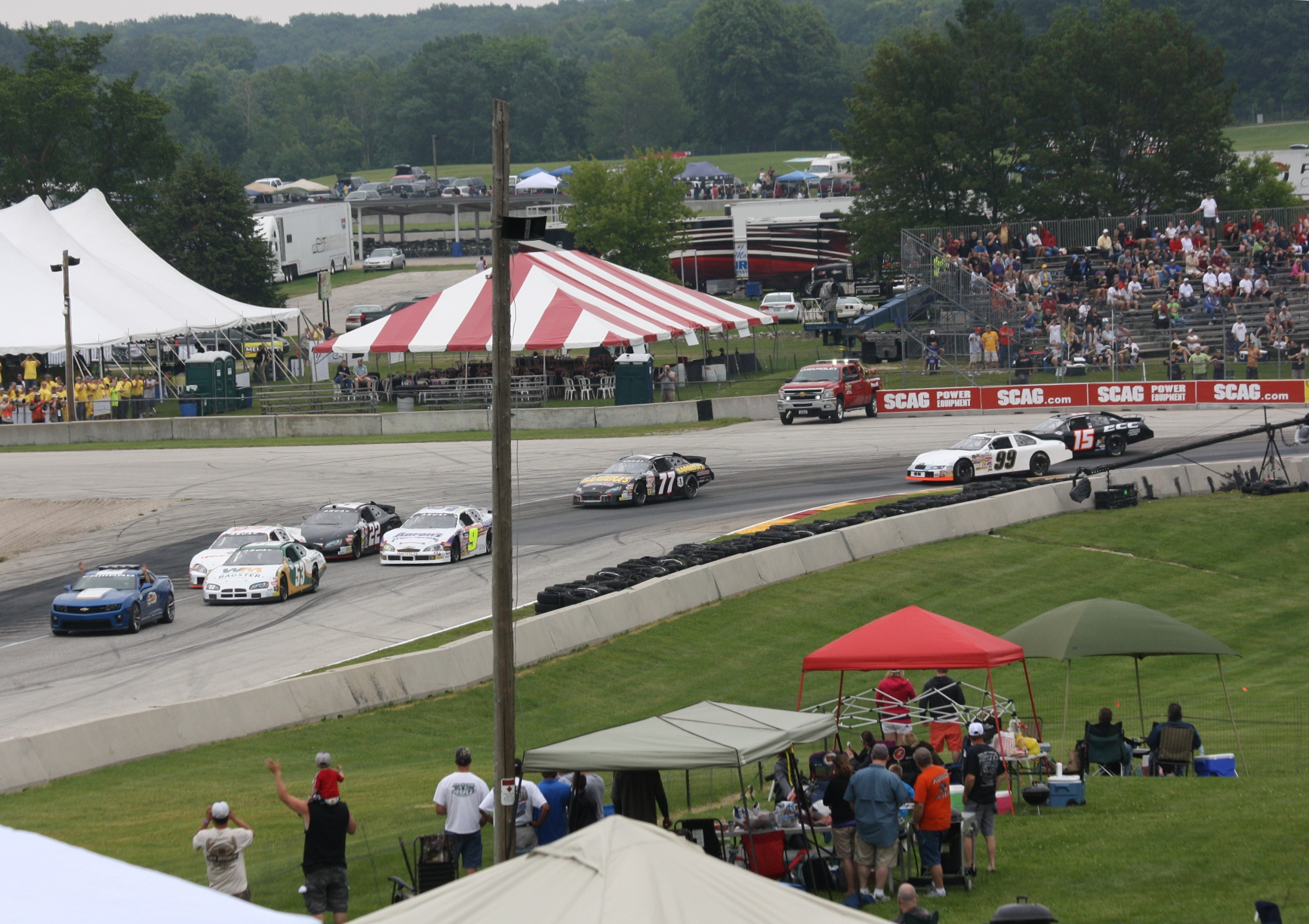
ARCA field at the start of the SCOTT 160 at Road America

The 2013 series schedule was announced in November 2012.

| No. | Race title | Track | Date |
|---|---|---|---|
| 1 | Lucas Oil 200 presented by MAVTV American Real | Daytona International Speedway, Daytona Beach | February 16 |
| 2 | ARCA Mobile 200 | Mobile International Speedway, Irvington | March 9 |
| 3 | Kentuckiana Ford Dealers ARCA 200 presented by Crosley Radio | Salem Speedway, Salem | April 28 |
| 4 | International Motorsports Hall of Fame 250 | Talladega Superspeedway, Lincoln | May 3 |
| 5 | Menards 200 presented by Federated Car Care | Toledo Speedway, Toledo | May 19 |
| 6 | Akona 250 presented by Federated Car Care | Elko Speedway, Elko New Market | June 1 |
| 7 | Pocono ARCA 200 | Pocono Raceway, Long Pond | June 8 |
| 8 | Patriot Pumps 200 | Michigan International Speedway, Brooklyn | June 14 |
| 9 | SCOTT 160 | Road America, Elkhart Lake | June 22 |
| 10 | Herr's Chase the Taste 200 | Winchester Speedway, Winchester | June 30 |
| 11 | Ansell ActivArmr 150 | Chicagoland Speedway, Joliet | July 21 |
| 12 | Barbera's Autoland 150 presented by Driven Racing Oil | New Jersey Motorsports Park, Millville | July 28 |
| 13 | ModSpace 125 | Pocono Raceway, Long Pond | August 2 |
| 14 | Primera Plastics 200 | Berlin Raceway, Marne | August 10 |
| 15 | Allen Crowe Memorial 100 | Illinois State Fairgrounds Racetrack, Springfield | August 18 |
| 16 | Herr's Live Life With Flavor 200 | Madison International Speedway, Rutland | August 25 |
| 17 | Southern Illinois 100 by Federated Car Care | DuQuoin State Fairgrounds Racetrack, DuQuoin | September 2 |
| 18 | Prairie Meadows 150 | Iowa Speedway, Newton | September 7 |
| 19 | Kentuckiana Ford Dealers ARCA Fall Classic presented by Federated Car Care | Salem Speedway, Salem | September 14 |
| 20 | ZLOOP 150 | Kentucky Speedway, Sparta | September 20 |
| 21 | Kansas Lottery 98.9 | Kansas Speedway, Kansas City | October 4 |

== Results and standings ==
=== Races ===
| No. | Race | Pole position | Most laps led | Winning driver | Manufacturer | No. | Winning team |
|---|---|---|---|---|---|---|---|
| 1 | Lucas Oil 200 presented by MAVTV American Real | John Wes Townley | Bobby Gerhart | John Wes Townley | Toyota | 15 | Venturini Motorsports |
| 2 | ARCA Mobile 200 | Mason Mingus | Grant Enfinger | Grant Enfinger | Ford | 90 | Team BCR Racing |
| 3 | Kentuckiana Ford Dealers 200 presented by Crosley Radio | Justin Boston | Frank Kimmel | Tom Hessert III | Dodge | 77 | Cunningham Motorsports |
| 4 | International Motorsports Hall of Fame 250 | Milka Duno | Frank Kimmel | Frank Kimmel | Toyota | 44 | ThorSport Racing |
| 5 | Menards 200 presented by Federated Car Care | Kyle Benjamin | Ken Schrader | Ken Schrader | Chevrolet | 52 | Ken Schrader Racing |
| 6 | Akona 250 presented by Federated Car Care | Ken Schrader | Frank Kimmel | Frank Kimmel | Toyota | 44 | ThorSport Racing |
| 7 | Pocono ARCA 200 | Frank Kimmel | Frank Kimmel | Chase Elliott | Chevrolet | 9 | Bill Elliott Racing |
| 8 | Patriot Pumps 200 | Ryan Blaney | Ryan Blaney | Brennan Poole | Toyota | 15 | Venturini Motorsports |
| 9 | SCOTT 160 | Andrew Ranger | Andrew Ranger; Austin Dillon | Chris Buescher | Ford | 99 | Roulo Brothers Racing |
| 10 | Herr's Chase the Taste 200 | Frank Kimmel | Frank Kimmel | Frank Kimmel | Toyota | 44 | ThorSport Racing |
| 11 | Ansell ActivArmr 150 | Ryan Blaney | Ryan Blaney | Corey LaJoie | Ford | 17 | Corey LaJoie Racing |
| 12 | Barbera's Autoland 150 presented by Driven Racing Oil | Andrew Ranger | Chase Elliott | Andrew Ranger | Dodge | 53 | NDS Motorsports |
| 13 | ModSpace 125 | Frank Kimmel | Erik Jones | Corey LaJoie | Ford | 17 | Corey LaJoie Racing |
| 14 | Primera Plastics 200 | Mason Mitchell | Erik Jones | Erik Jones | Toyota | 15 | Venturini Motorsports |
| 15 | Allen Crowe Memorial 100 | Mason Mitchell | Brennan Poole | Brennan Poole | Chevrolet | 15 | Venturini Motorsports |
| 16 | Herr's Live Life With Flavor 200 | Ross Kenseth | Kyle Benjamin | Kyle Benjamin | Toyota | 15 | Venturini Motorsports |
| 17 | Southern Illinois 100 by Federated Car Care | Ken Schrader | Ken Schrader | Ken Schrader | Chevrolet | 52 | Ken Schrader Racing |
| 18 | Prairie Meadows 150 | Mason Mingus | Chad Boat | Grant Enfinger | Ford | 90 | Team BCR Racing |
| 19 | Kentuckiana Ford Dealers ARCA Fall Classic presented by Federated Car Care | Justin Boston | Kyle Benjamin | Kyle Benjamin | Toyota | 15 | Venturini Motorsports |
| 20 | ZLOOP 150 | Frank Kimmel | Corey LaJoie | Corey LaJoie | Ford | 17 | Corey LaJoie Racing |
| 21 | Kansas Lottery 98.9 | Dylan Kwasniewski | Frank Kimmel | Frank Kimmel | Toyota | 44 | ThorSport Racing |

=== Point standings ===
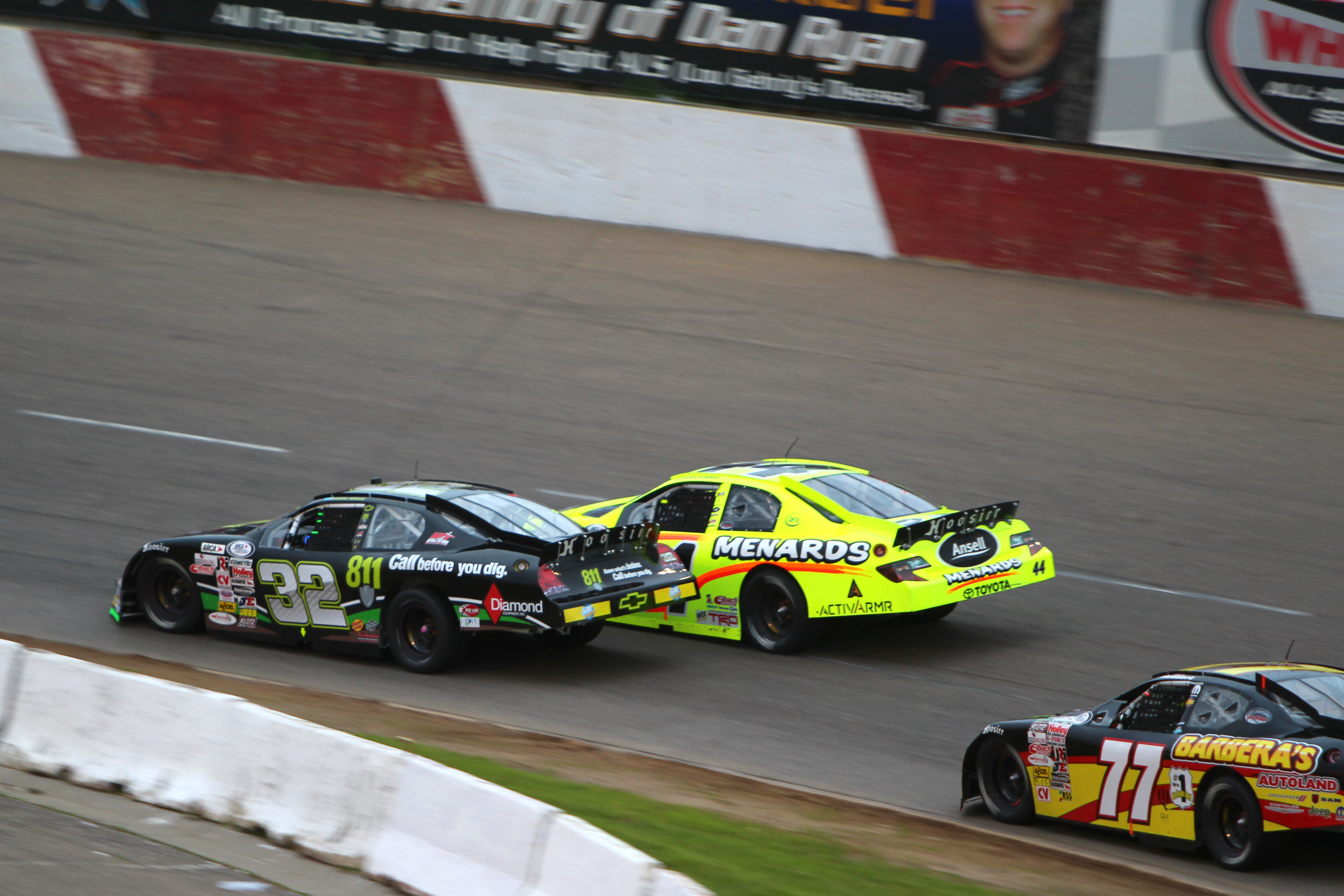
Frank Kimmel and Mason Mingus battling at Elko Speedway

(key) Bold – Pole position awarded by time. Italics – Pole position set by final practice results or rainout. * – Most laps led.

| Pos | Driver | DAY | MOB | SLM | TAL | TOL | ELK | POC | MCH | ROA | WIN | CHI | NJE | POC | BER | ISF | MAD | DQN | IOW | SLM | KEN | KAN | Points |
|---|---|---|---|---|---|---|---|---|---|---|---|---|---|---|---|---|---|---|---|---|---|---|---|
| 1 | Frank Kimmel | 4 | 5 | 6* | 1 | 3 | 1* | 3 | 3 | 7 | 1* | 9 | 5 | 2 | 3 | 4 | 3 | 7 | 10 | 3 | 9 | 1* | 5735 |
| 2 | Mason Mingus | 7 | **4** | 10 | 2 | 2 | 9 | 6 | 6 | 10 | 12 | 6 | 8 | 6 | 2 | 16 | 5 | 12 | **7** | 9 | 10 | 9 | 5370 |
| 3 | Justin Boston | 31 | 6 | **9** | 30 | 4 | 4 | 9 | 4 | 8 | 18 | 7 | 6 | 3 | 6 | 5 | 2 | 3 | 16 | **23** | 8 | 5 | 5120 |
| 4 | Tom Hessert III | 12 | 11 | 1 | 26 | 10 | 2 | 4 | 21 | 3 | 6 | 11 | 2 | 16 | 8 | 3 | 10 | 2 | 8 | 19 | 11 | 13 | 5005 |
| 5 | Josh Williams | 15 | 26 | 19 | 6 | 8 | 6 | 10 | 16 | 23 | 18 | 2 | 12 | 13 | 9 | 10 | 8 | 13 | 12 | 6 | 15 | 10 | 4825 |
| 6 | Mason Mitchell | 13 | 8 | 16 | 25 | 7 | 11 | 5 | 19 | 14 | 5 | 22 | | 8 | **5** | **7** | 7 | 6 | 6 | 5 | 2 | 2 | 4660 |
| 7 | Milka Duno | 28 | 13 | 8 | **29** | 13 | 13 | 14 | 11 | 12 | 10 | 15 | 21 | 21 | 15 | 21 | 12 | 16 | 19 | 13 | 23 | 15 | 4405 |
| 8 | Will Kimmel | 33 | 27 | 3 | 36 | 29 | 18 | 31 | 7 | 11 | 20 | 4 | 4 | 7 | 23 | 28 | 22 | 24 | 9 | 12 | 7 | 6 | 4215 |
| 9 | Thomas Praytor | 22 | 16 | 21 | 22 | 18 | 10 | 16 | 10 | 16 | 9 | 23 | 17 | 24 | 18 | 22 | 14 | 20 | 21 | 17 | 19 | 19 | 4210 |
| 10 | Spencer Gallagher | 21 | 22 | 2 | 27 | 26 | 8 | 8 | 17 | Wth | | 13 | 16 | 5 | 11 | 2 | 4 | Wth | 14 | 16 | 3 | 7 | 3790 |
| 11 | James Hylton | 26 | 23 | 26 | 33 | 28 | 19 | 24 | 24 | 26 | 19 | 17 | 18 | 29 | 21 | 29 | 17 | 26 | 24 | 22 | 21 | 18 | 3630 |
| 12 | Roger Carter | 27 | 15 | 12 | 35 | 17 | 14 | 28 | 8 | 21 | 15 | | 27 | 28 | 20 | 23 | 24 | 28 | 29 | 21 | 16 | 24 | 3440 |
| 13 | James Swanson | | 18 | 28 | 21 | 30 | 17 | 25 | 20 | 20 | 16 | 20 | 25 | 26 | 22 | 18 | 20 | 27 | 30 | 30 | 28 | 30 | 3245 |
| 14 | Darrell Basham | | | | 23 | 19 | 15 | 22 | 25 | 24 | 11 | 19 | 23 | 27 | 19 | | | | 22 | 15 | 22 | 26 | 2390 |
| 15 | Grant Enfinger | 39 | 1* | 7 | 16 | 15 | | | 5 | | | Wth | | | | | | | 1 | | 4 | 32 | 1970 |
| 16 | Bobby Gerhart | 29* | | | 24 | 16 | | 19 | | | | | | 17 | 13 | 15 | | | 20 | | 13 | 17 | 1655 |
| 17 | Kyle Benjamin | | 2 | 11 | | **23** | 7 | | | | 8 | | | | | | 1* | | 5 | 1* | | | 1620 |
| 18 | Chad Boat | 10 | | | | | | | 15 | | | 5 | | 30 | | | | | 3* | | 5 | 23 | 1430 |
| 19 | Chris Bailey Jr. | | | | | 24 | | 23 | | | 21 | 24 | 28 | 32 | | 30 | | 31 | | 28 | 14 | 28 | 1365 |
| 20 | Taylor Ferns | | 9 | | | 20 | 12 | | | | | | | 15 | | 9 | | 10 | 13 | | 12 | | 1340 |
| 21 | Wayne Peterson | | | Wth | | | 22 | | 27 | 25 | 22 | 26 | | 31 | 24 | 32 | 26 | Wth | | 26 | 31 | 31 | 1320 |
| 22 | Corey LaJoie | | | | | | | | | | | 1 | | 1 | | | | | 4 | | 1* | 25 | 1295 |
| 23 | George Cushman | DNQ | | | 8 | | | 12 | | | | | 30 | 34 | 26 | | | | 27 | | 17 | 16 | 1265 |
| 24 | Austin Wayne Self | | | | | 6 | | | | | 2 | | 10 | | 4 | | | | 15 | 10 | | | 1160 |
| 25 | John Wes Townley | **1** | | 13 | 34 | | | | | 15 | | | | | | | | | | | | 3 | 1095 |
| 26 | Brennan Poole | | | | | | | | 1 | | 3 | | | | | 1* | 9 | 4 | | | | | 1065 |
| 27 | Kyle Weatherman | | | 4 | | 12 | | | | | 4 | | | | Wth | | | | 2 | 2 | | | 1055 |
| 28 | Chase Elliott | | | | | | | 1 | | 4 | | | 3* | 9 | | | | | | | 27 | | 975 |
| 29 | Ken Schrader | | | | | 1* | **5** | | | | | | | | | | | **1*** | | 4 | | | 930 |
| 30 | Bo LeMastus | 16 | 21 | 17 | 31 | 32 | Wth | | | 19 | | | | | | | | | | | | | 905 |
| 31 | Tom Berte | | | | | | | 18 | | 17 | | 18 | | | | | | | | | 25 | 22 | 900 |
| 32 | Mark Meunier | | | 23 | | | 16 | | | | | | | | | | | | | 24 | 24 | 21 | 860 |
| 33 | Erik Jones | | | | | | | 2 | | | | | | 12* | 1* | | | | | | 6 | | 855 |
| 34 | Caleb Armstrong | 34 | | | 3 | | | | | | | 8 | | | | | | | 11 | 11 | | | 815 |
| 35 | Mark Thompson | 8 | | | 4 | | | | | | | | | | | | | | | | | 14 | 810 |
| 36 | Buster Graham | 17 | | | 17 | | | 13 | 9 | | | | | 20 | | | | | | | | | 770 |
| 37 | Kelly Kovski | | | | | 9 | | | | | | | | | 10 | 13 | | 8 | | | | | 740 |
| 38 | Dominick Casola | | | | | | | 27 | | 22 | | 16 | 29 | 19 | | | | 23 | | | | | 700 |
| 39 | Ryan Blaney | | | | | | | | **2*** | 5 | | **3*** | | | | | | | | | | | 690 |
| 40 | Brad Smith | | | | | | | | | | | | | | 25 | | | 32 | | 27 | 29 | 29 | 690 |
| 41 | Michael Lira | | | | | | | | | | | | | | 12 | | 13 | | 18 | 7 | | | 670 |
| 42 | Steven Mathews | | | | | | | | | | | | | | | | | | 31 | | 20 | 8 | 645 |
| 43 | Brian Finney | | 10 | 18 | | 11 | | | | | | Wth | | | | | 19 | | | | | | 630 |
| 44 | Brennan Newberry | 6 | | | 11 | | | | | | | | | 4 | | | | | | | | | 585 |
| 45 | Blake Hillard | | | 22 | | 14 | | | | | 7 | | | | | | | | | 25 | | | 580 |
| 46 | Chris Buescher | 30 | | | | | | | | 1 | | | 22 | | | | | | | 18 | | | 575 |
| 47 | Jason Basham | | | 14 | | | | | | | | | | | | 20 | 21 | 14 | | | | | 575 |
| 48 | Korbin Forrister | | 14 | | 13 | 25 | | | 18 | | | | | | | | | | | | | | 570 |
| 49 | Sean Corr | 5 | | | 14 | | | 11 | | | | | | | | | | | | | | | 540 |
| 50 | A. J. Henriksen | | | | | | | 7 | | 13 | | 10 | | | | | QL | | | | | | 540 |
| 51 | Andrew Ranger | | | | | | | | | **2*** | | | **1** | | | DNQ | | | | | | | 515 |
| 52 | Anderson Bowen | | 3 | 20 | | | | | | | | | | | | | 15 | | | | | | 510 |
| 53 | David Levine | | | | | | | | | 9 | | 14 | 13 | | | | | | | | | | 510 |
| 54 | Ed Pompa | 25 | | | | | | 21 | | | | | | 23 | | | | | | 14 | | | 505 |
| 55 | Zach Ralston | | 25 | | | | | | | | | | | | | | | | | | | 20 | 485 |
| 56 | Dylan Kwasniewski | | | | | | | | | | | | | | | | | | | | | **4** | 480 |
| 57 | Austin Rettig | | | | | | | | 22 | | | | | | | 19 | | 18 | | | 30 | | 475 |
| 58 | Charles Evans Jr. | | 12 | 15 | | 22 | | | | | | | | | | | | | | | | | 445 |
| 59 | Justin Allison | | | | | | | | | | | | | | | | | | | | | 11 | 425 |
| 60 | Bobby Grewohl | | | | | | | | | | | | | | | | | | | | | 12 | 420 |
| 61 | Tyler Speer | | 19 | | | | | | | | | | | | | 12 | | 25 | | | | | 410 |
| 62 | Nick Tucker | | 7 | 24 | | | | | | | | 25 | | | | | | | | | | | 410 |
| 63 | Chris Windom | | | | | | | | | | | | | | | 6 | | 5 | | | | | 410 |
| 64 | Garrett Smithley | | | | | | | 17 | | | | | | 14 | | | | | | | 26 | | 405 |
| 65 | Ricky Ehrgott | 3 | | | 9 | | | | | | | | | | | | | | | | | | 400 |
| 66 | Dave Savicki | | | 27 | DNQ | | | 33 | 28 | | 23 | | | | | | | | | | | | 390 |
| 67 | Rick Clifton | 23 | | | | | | | 14 | | | | | | | | | | 23 | | | | 390 |
| 68 | Bill Catania | | | | | | | | | | | | | | 17 | 26 | | | | 20 | | | 375 |
| 69 | Matt Kurzejewski | 9 | | | 10 | | | | | | | | | | | | | | | | | | 370 |
| 70 | Cody Lane | | 24 | | | 27 | | | | | 14 | | | | | | | | | | | | 365 |
| 71 | Matt Tifft | | | | | 5 | | | | | | | 15 | | | | | | | | | | 360 |
| 72 | A. J. Fike | | | | | | | | | | | | | | | 14 | | 9 | | | | | 350 |
| 73 | Ryan Unzicker | | | | | | | | | | | | | | | 11 | | 11 | | | | | 350 |
| 74 | Scott Lagasse Jr. | | | | | | | | | | | | | | | | | | | | | 27 | 350 |
| 75 | Terry Jones | 24 | | | 5 | | | | | | | | | | | | | | | | | | 315 |
| 76 | Shane Cockrum | | | | | | | | | | | | | | | 8 | | 22 | | | | | 310 |
| 77 | Ed Bull | | | | | | | | | 18 | | | 14 | | | | | | | | | | 300 |
| 78 | John Ferrier | DNQ | | | 7 | | | 30 | | | | | | | | | | | | | | | 300 |
| 79 | Galen Hassler | 32 | | | 20 | | | | | | | 27 | | | | | | | | | | | 295 |
| 80 | Brian Kaltreider | | | | | | | 15 | | | | | | 18 | | | | | | | | | 295 |
| 81 | Mike Buckley | | | | | | | | 13 | | | 21 | | | | | | | | | | | 290 |
| 82 | Will Gallaher | | | | | | | | | | | | | | | | 18 | | 17 | | | | 285 |
| 83 | Brad Lloyd | | | | | | | | | | 13 | | | 22 | | | | | | | | | 285 |
| 84 | Nick Igdalsky | | | | | | | 26 | | | | | | 11 | | | | | | | | | 275 |
| 85 | Benny Chastain | 19 | | | 19 | | | | | | | | | | | | | | | | | | 270 |
| 86 | Justin Lloyd | | | | | | | | | | | | | | 14 | 25 | | | | | | | 265 |
| 87 | Brent Cross | DNQ | | | | | | 20 | | | | | | 25 | | | | | | | | | 260 |
| 88 | Clay Campbell | 14 | | | 28 | | | | | | | | | | | | | | | | | | 250 |
| 89 | Kyle Martel | | | | | | | 32 | | | | | | 10 | | | | | | | | | 250 |
| 90 | Karl Weber | | | | | | | | | | | | | | | | 11 | | 32 | | | | 245 |
| 91 | Darin Matthews | | 17 | | | | | | | | | | | | | | | | 28 | | | | 235 |
| 92 | Spencer Montgomery | | | | | | | | | | | | | | | 24 | | 21 | | | | | 235 |
| 93 | Mark Littleton | | | | | | | | | | | | | | | 27 | | 17 | | | | | 230 |
| 94 | Austin Dillon | | | | | | | | | 6* | | | | | | | | | | | | | 220 |
| 95 | Ross Kenseth | | | | | | | | | | | | | | | | **6** | | | | | | 220 |
| 96 | Kyle Larson | 2 | | | | | | | | | | | | | | | | | | | | | 220 |
| 97 | Jonathan Eilan | | | | | | 3 | | | | | | | | | | | | | | | | 215 |
| 98 | Mark Gibson | | | | | | | | 23 | | | | 26 | | | | | | | | | | 215 |
| 99 | Donnie Neuenberger | 18 | | | 32 | | | | | | | | | | | | | | | | | | 210 |
| 100 | Travis Swaim | | | 5 | | | | | | | | | | | | | | | | | | | 205 |
| 101 | Brian Wong | | | | | | | | | | | | 7 | | | | | | | | | | 200 |
| 102 | Drew Charlson | 38 | | | 15 | | | | | | | | | | | | | | | | | | 195 |
| 103 | Clint King | | | | | | | | | | | | | | 7 | | | | | | | | 195 |
| 104 | Trevor Edwards | | | | | | | | | | | | | | | | | | | 8 | | | 190 |
| 105 | Steve Minghenelli | | | | | | | | | | | | 9 | | | | | | | | | | 185 |
| 106 | Nelson Canache Jr. | | | | | | | | | | | | 11 | | | | | | | | | | 175 |
| 107 | Michel Disdier | 11 | | | | | | | | | | | | | | | | | | | | | 175 |
| 108 | Joseph Hughs | | | | | | | | | | | | | | | 33 | 25 | | | | | | 170 |
| 109 | Cody McMahan | | | | 12 | | | | | | | | | Wth | | | | | | | | | 170 |
| 110 | Dale Quarterley | | | | | | | | | | | 12 | | | | | | | | | | | 170 |
| 111 | Kent Schenkel | | | | | | | | 12 | | | | | | | | | | | | | | 170 |
| 112 | Tyler Reddick | | | | | | | | | | | | | | | | | 15 | | | | | 160 |
| 113 | Roby Bujdoso | | 20 | | | 33 | | | | | | | | | | | | | | | | | 155 |
| 114 | Brett Hudson | 36 | | 25 | | | | | | | | | | | | | | | | | | | 155 |
| 115 | Josh White | | | | | | | | | | | | | | | 31 | | 30 | | | | | 155 |
| 116 | Josh Hobson | | | | | | | | | | | | | | 16 | | | | | | | | 150 |
| 117 | Travis Sauter | | | | | | | | | | | | | | | | 16 | | | | | | 150 |
| 118 | Justin South | | | | | | | | | | | | | | | 17 | | | | | | | 145 |
| 119 | Christopher Brown | | | | | | | | | | | | | | | | | | | | 18 | | 140 |
| 120 | Barry Fitzgerald | Wth | | | 18 | | | | | | | | | | | | | | | | | | 140 |
| 121 | Don Thompson | | | | | | | 29 | | | | | | 35 | | | | | | | | | 140 |
| 122 | Steve Fox | | | | | | | 34 | | | | | 24 | 36 | | | | | | | | | 135 |
| 123 | Robert Mitten | | | | | | | | | | | | 19 | | | | | | | | | | 135 |
| 124 | Devin Steele | | | | | | | | | | | | | | | Wth | | 19 | | | | | 135 |
| 125 | Nick Barstad | | | | | | 20 | | | | | | | | | | | | | | | | 130 |
| 126 | Tim Cowen | | | | | | | | | | | | 20 | | | | | | | | | | 130 |
| 127 | Dexter Stacey | 20 | | | | | | | | | | | | | | | | | | | | | 130 |
| 128 | Marty Asher | | | | | | 21 | | | | | | | | | | | | | | | | 125 |
| 129 | Jake Francis | | | | | 21 | | | | | | | | | | | | | | | | | 125 |
| 130 | D. J. Weltmeyer | | | | | | | | | | | | | | | | 23 | | | | | | 115 |
| 131 | Kyle Hadley | | | | | | | | | | | | | | | | | | | 29 | 32 | | 110 |
| 132 | David Sear | | | | | | | | | | | | | | | | | | 25 | | | | 105 |
| 133 | Ryan Heavner | | | | | | | | | | | | | | | | | | 26 | | | | 100 |
| 134 | Jeffery MacZink | | | | | | | | 26 | | | | | | | | | | | | | | 100 |
| 135 | Michael Covington | | | | | | | | | | | | | | Wth | | | 29 | | | | | 85 |
| 136 | Dennis Strickland | | | | | 31 | | | | | | | | | | | | | | | | | 75 |
| 137 | Dick Doheny | | | | | | | | | | | | | 33 | | | | | | | | | 65 |
| 138 | Bubba Wallace | 35 | | | | | | | | | | | | | | | | | | | | | 55 |
| 139 | Brad Dubil | | | | | | | | | | | | | | | 34 | | 33 | | | | | 50 |
| 140 | Steve Kemp | 37 | | | | | | | | | | | | | | | | | | | | | 45 |
| 141 | Julien Jousse | 40 | | | | | | | | | | | | | | | | | | | | | 30 |
| 142 | Andrew Gresel | DNQ | | | | | | | | | | | | | | | | | | | | | |
| 143 | Dustin Hapka | | | | | | Wth | | | | | | | | | | | | | | | | |
| 144 | Dale Shearer | | | | | | | | | | | | | | | Wth | | Wth | | | | | |
| Pos | Driver | DAY | MOB | SLM | TAL | TOL | ELK | POC | MCH | ROA | WIN | CHI | NJE | POC | BER | ISF | MAD | DQN | IOW | SLM | KEN | KAN | Points |

== See also ==
- 2013 NASCAR Sprint Cup Series
- 2013 NASCAR Nationwide Series
- 2013 NASCAR Camping World Truck Series
- 2013 NASCAR K&N Pro Series East
- 2013 NASCAR K&N Pro Series West
- 2013 NASCAR Whelen Modified Tour
- 2013 NASCAR Canadian Tire Series
- 2013 NASCAR Toyota Series
- 2013 NASCAR Whelen Euro Series
