= Monica Barham =

New Zealand architect (1920–1983)

- Born: Monica Frances Ford; 1920; Invercargill
- Died: 19 September 1983 (aged 62–63)
- Education: Auckland University College
- Occupation: Architect

Monica Frances Barham (née Ford; 1920 – 19 September 1983) was a New Zealand architect.

== Biography ==
Barham was born and raised in Invercargill. She was the second-eldest of five daughters of Allan Ford, an architect, and Hildegarde Ford. She was educated at Southland Girls' High School in Invercargill and as a boarder at Columba College in Dunedin.

In 1937, aged 17, Barham began working in her father's practice while studying architecture by distance through Auckland University College. In 1942, she moved to Auckland to complete her studies; she continued to work for her father in university holidays. She completed her Diploma of Architecture in 1944 and registered as an architect the following year, becoming the first female registered architect in the Southland and Otago branches of the New Zealand Institute of Architects. She also sat and passed the examinations to qualify as an associate of the Royal Institute of British Architects.

One of Barham's earliest buildings is the remodelling of the Brown Owl Milk Bar in 1948. Her innovative use of glass art has integrated graphics.

In 1946, Barham and her husband Cecil started an architectural practice in Dee Street, Invercargill, named Barham and Barham Architects. Barham was possibly the first New Zealand woman architect to practise as an owner and partner of an architectural business. In 1947, she was the only woman listed as "registered in practice" by the New Zealand Institute of Architects.

Barham's work as an architect included community buildings and churches. She designed Rakiura Museum on Stewart Island, and the firm was responsible for the library building at Mataura, the Gore Women's Club, the Winton RSA Clubrooms, a central Invercargill medical centre and the Southland Centennial Agricultural Hall, among other projects.

Barham also had an interest in art. In 1942, she collaborated with local artist Molly Macalister and created sandblasted glass room partitions decorated with images from children's nursery rhymes for the children's ward of Gore Hospital. From the mid-1960s, she taught art at Southland Boys' High School and James Hargest College. Several of her artworks are held in the collection of the Invercargill Public Art Gallery.

Barham was involved in community organisations in Invercargill such as the Southland Altrusa Club, the Business and Professional Women's Club, and Girl Guides.

Barham and her husband retired to Christchurch in 1978. In 1983, Barham died from a degenerative condition. Her life and work was the subject of an exhibition at Invercargill's museum and art gallery Te Waka Tuia in 2024.

== Personal life ==
Barham met her husband Cecil in 1945 and they married the following year. The couple had six children between 1946 and 1958.

== Bibliography ==
- Kerr, Bronwen, “Crit/Exhibition: Monica Barham: So You’re Building: You and the Architect,” He Waka Tuia, Invercargill, 11 May -16 June, Architecture NZ (July/August 2024): 124.
- Rule, Megan. Monica Barham: So You’re Building: You and the Architect, Auckland: SPA Press, 2024.
- Rule, Megan. “Crit/Itinerary 75: Monica F. Barham in Southland.” Architecture NZ (May/Jun 2024): 84-7.
- Rule, Megan. “Not Afraid to Try Anything: Monica Barham,” in Making Space: A History of New Zealand Women in Architecture, ed. Elizabeth Cox. Auckland: MUP, 2022,144-153.
