= Jason Basham =

American racing driver (born 1979)

- Born: January 5, 1979 (age 47); Henryville, Indiana, U.S.

ARCA Menards Series career
- 60 races run over 9 years
- Best finish: 17th (2009)
- First race: 2003 Giant 200 (Pocono)
- Last race: 2013 Southern Illinois 100 (DuQuoin)
Wins	Top tens	Poles
0	1	0
- Statistics up to date as of June 29, 2023.

Jason Basham (born January 5, 1979) is an American professional stock car racing driver who has previously competed in the ARCA Racing Series. He is the son of longtime ARCA competitor Darrell Basham, whose team he drove for over the course of his career and also brother of Mike Basham who also competed in ARCA.

== Racing career ==
In 2003, Basham would make his debut in the ARCA Re/Max Series at Pocono Raceway driving the No. 94 Chevrolet for Darrell Basham Racing, where he would start 28th and finish one place higher in 27th due to an engine issue. He would then fail to qualify for the next two events following the race. For the following year, he would race for Mark Gibson Racing at Salem Speedway driving the No. 56 Chevrolet, where he would finish 32nd after three laps due to a rear end issue. He would then run select starts for his fathers team, earning a best finish of 19th at Gateway Motorsports Park.

In 2005, Basham would enter in all but one race (with the one race being at the second Toledo Speedway event that September), primarily driving the No. 94. He would finish 22nd in the final points standings with a best finish of 21st at Kansas Speedway, despite failing to qualify for fourteen events and only racing in eight events. He would only enter in two races for the team the following year, failing to qualify for both events, including the event at Talladega Superspeedway where he would be placed in the No. 10 Chevrolet for Fast Track Racing after qualifying; he would finish 40th after six laps due to vibrations in the car. It was also during this year that he would make two starts in the CRA Street Stock Series, getting a best finish of 29th at the first Winchester Speedway event. He would then enter two more races in ARCA in 2007, successfully qualifying for both events at Kansas and Michigan International Speedway, although he would finish 38th in both events due to overheating issues. He would run eight more races in 2008, where he would get a best finish of 18th at Toledo.

In 2009, after skipping the season opening race at Daytona International Speedway, Basham would run the remaining races on the schedule in the No. 94, getting four top-twenty finishes with a best result of 15th at the DuQuoin State Fairgrounds dirt track. He would finish 17th in the final points standings, and with father Darrell Basham finish 12th in the standings, that made them the first father and son duo to finish in the top twenty in the standings in the same year. He would run only eleven races the following year, finish 25th in the points. It was also during this year that he earned his first top-ten finish at the Illinois State Fairgrounds dirt track, where he would finish 10th and on the lead lap.

After not racing in ARCA for two years, Basham would make his return to the series in 2013 at Salem Speedway for Darrell Basham Racing, this time driving the flagship No. 34 Chevrolet for the team. He would go on to finish nine laps down in 14th after starting 25th. He would make three more starts during the year, including Madison International Speedway and both dirt track events, finishing 14th at DuQuoin. This would be his most recent start in the series, as he has made limited starts in the East Bay Winternationals and the Indiana Late Model Series since 2015.

== Motorsports results ==
=== ARCA Racing Series ===
(key) (Bold – Pole position awarded by qualifying time. Italics – Pole position earned by points standings or practice time. * – Most laps led.)

ARCA Racing Series results
Year	Team	No.	Make	1	2	3	4	5	6	7	8	9	10	11	12	13	14	15	16	17	18	19	20	21	22	23	ARSC	Pts	Ref
2003	Darrell Basham Racing	94	Chevy	DAY	ATL	NSH	SLM	TOL	KEN	CLT	BLN	KAN	MCH	LER	POC; 27	POC; DNQ	NSH; DNQ	ISF	WIN	DSF	CHI	SLM	TAL	CLT	SBO		141st	145	
2004	Mark Gibson Racing	56	Chevy	DAY	NSH	SLM; 32	KEN	TOL	CLT																		49th	590	
2004	Darrell Basham Racing	94	Chevy							KAN; 30	POC; 29	MCH	SBO	BLN	KEN	GTW; 19	POC; 37	LER	NSH	ISF; 34	TOL	DSF; 38	CHI; Wth	SLM	TAL		49th	590	
2005	Darrell Basham Racing	04	Chevy	DAY; DNQ																		TOL; Wth		CHI; DNQ			22nd	2130	
2005	Darrell Basham Racing	94	Chevy		NSH; DNQ		KEN; DNQ	TOL; DNQ	LAN; DNQ	MIL; 38	POC; 41	MCH; DNQ	KAN; 21	KEN; DNQ	BLN; DNQ	POC; 26	GTW; 39	LER; DNQ	NSH; 35	MCH; DNQ	ISF; 28				SLM; DNQ	TAL; DNQ	22nd	2130	
2005	Darrell Basham Racing	94	Pontiac			SLM; DNQ																					22nd	2130	
2005	Darrell Basham Racing	34	Chevy																				DSF; 39				22nd	2130	
2006	Darrell Basham Racing	94	Chevy	DAY	NSH	SLM; DNQ	WIN	KEN	TOL	POC	MCH	KAN	KEN	BLN	POC	GTW	NSH	MCH	ISF	MIL	TOL	DSF	CHI	SLM	TAL; DNQ	IOW	170th	30	
2006	Fast Track Racing	10	Chevy																						TAL; 40		170th	30	
2007	Darrell Basham Racing	94	Chevy	DAY	USA	NSH	SLM	KAN; 38	WIN	KEN	TOL	IOW	POC	MCH; 38	BLN	KEN	POC	NSH	ISF	MIL	GTW	DSF	CHI	SLM	TAL	TOL	155th	80	
2008	Darrell Basham Racing	94	Chevy	DAY	SLM; DNQ	IOW; DNQ	KAN	CAR; 47	KEN; 37	TOL; 18	POC	MCH	CAY; 28	KEN	BLN	POC; 37	NSH; 38	ISF	DSF	CHI; 35	SLM; DNQ	NJE; 22	TAL	TOL			49th	615	
2009	Darrell Basham Racing	94	Chevy	DAY	SLM; 27	CAR; 31	TAL; 35	KEN; 32	TOL; 22	POC; 25	MCH; 36	MFD; 29	IOW; 26	KEN; 29	BLN; 20	POC; 24	ISF; 38	CHI; 37	TOL; 28	DSF; 15	NJE; 18	SLM; 17	KAN; 29	CAR; 32			17th	2835	
2010	Darrell Basham Racing	94	Chevy	DAY	PBE	SLM	TEX; 31	TAL; 39	TOL	POC; 23	MCH; 32	IOW	MFD	POC; 25	BLN	NJE	ISF; 10	CHI; 31	DSF; 17	TOL	SLM; 14	KAN; 28	CAR; 40				25th	1080	
2013	Darrell Basham Racing	34	Chevy	DAY	MOB	SLM; 14	TAL	TOL	ELK	POC	MCH	ROA	WIN	CHI	NJM	POC	BLN	ISF; 20	MAD; 21	DSF; 14	IOW	SLM	KEN	KAN			47th	575	
