= NEMCO Motorsports =

NASCAR team

- Owners: Andrea Nemechek; Joe Nemechek
- Base: Mooresville, North Carolina
- Series: Historic Sportscar Racing; Sportscar Vintage Racing Association; ARCA Menards Series
- Race drivers: 29. Ryan Gemmell (part-time)
- Manufacturer: Toyota
- Opened: 1989

Career
- Debut: Cup Series: 1993 Slick 50 300 (New Hampshire); Xfinity Series: 1989 AC Delco 200 (North Carolina); Craftsman Truck Series: 1995 Ford Credit 125 (MMR); ARCA Menards Series: 2024 General Tire 100 at The Glen (Watkins Glen)
- Latest race: Cup Series: 2014 The Profit on CNBC 500 (Phoenix); Xfinity Series: 2016 Subway Firecracker 250 (Daytona); Craftsman Truck Series: 2021 BrakeBest Select 159 (Daytona); ARCA Menards Series: 2026 General Tire 100 at The Glen (Watkins Glen)
- Drivers' Championships: Total: 1 Cup Series: 0 Xfinity Series: 1; 1992; Craftsman Truck Series: 0 ARCA Menards Series: 0
- Race victories: Total: 26; Cup Series: 0 Xfinity Series: 19; Craftsman Truck Series: 7 ARCA Menards Series: 0
- Pole positions: Total: 22; Cup Series: 0 Xfinity Series: 19; Craftsman Truck Series: 3 ARCA Menards Series: 0

NEMCO Motorsports is an American professional stock car racing team that currently competes in historic racing and part-time in the ARCA Menards Series. The team is owned by driver Joe Nemechek and his family. NEMCO Motorsports has had success, winning the 1992 Busch Series championship. The team previously competed in Cup, Xfinity, and Craftsman Truck Series competition.

== NASCAR Cup Series ==
=== Car No. 87 history ===
NEMCO made its Winston Cup debut during the 1993 season at the Slick 50 300, where Nemechek started fifteenth and finished 36th in the No. 87 car. NEMCO ran two more races with Nemechek that year, at Watkins Glen and Michigan, where he finished 21st and 37th, respectively. NEMCO did not race in the series again until the 1995 season, when Nemechek moved the operation up to Cup full-time. With sponsorship from Burger King, Nemechek posted four top-tens and finished 28th in points. The next season, he had just two top-tens and dropped to 34th in points. After he signed with SABCO Racing, Nemechek abandoned the team's Cup program, and sold the equipment to the SABCO team.

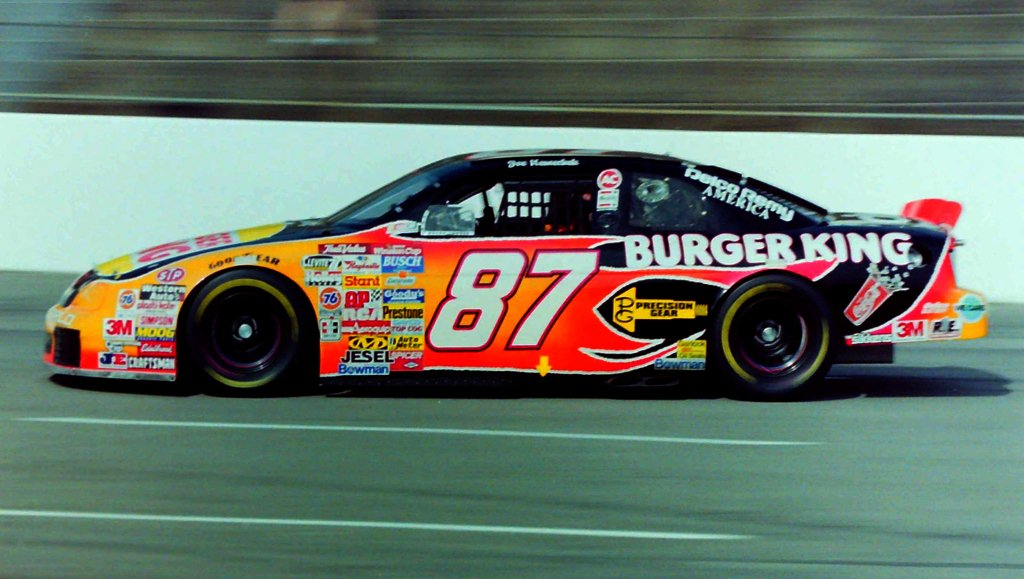
Nemechek's 1996 car

NEMCO returned to the Winston Cup Series in 1999, fielding the No. 87 Bully Hill Vineyards Chevrolet Monte Carlo driven by Ron Fellows at Watkins Glen. Fellows started seventh, led three laps, and finished in second place. Fellows ran at Watkins Glen again the following year, but suffered a blown engine and finished 43rd. During the 2001 season, Fellows began running Watkins Glen as well the series' other road course at Sears Point International Raceway. He led the most laps, but finished 38th after wrecking at Sears Point, and 42nd at Watkins Glen after suffering axle problems. Fellows' last race for NEMCO came in 2002 at Sears Point, where he started 19th and finished 25th. Fellows left NEMCO after the 2002 series to drive for Dale Earnhardt Incorporated in 2003.

NEMCO did not field a Cup car again until 2005 at Sears Point, when it leased a car to Christine Marie Motorsports to be driven by Chris Cook. He started and finished 28th. The team also attempted Watkins Glen that year, but failed to qualify.

NEMCO returned to race full-time in the 2009 season with Joe Nemechek following his departure from Furniture Row Racing. The car was leased to Scott Speed and the Red Bull Racing Team for two races when Speed did not qualify.

In 2010, Nemechek ran a full season, but only managed to finish one race, due to funding issues. Nemechek secured sponsorship through England Stove Works for the Daytona 500 and succeeded in qualifying, but wrecked during the race. For the fall Talladega race, sponsorship was provided by HostGator.com. They also sponsored the car in the second Texas race, but engine failure took the car out early.

For 2011, the team is back full-time yet again. Nemechek qualified for the Daytona 500, being the fastest Toyota in the field. An early accident took the car out of the 500 early though. Sponsorship was provided by AM FM Energy, and DAB Constructors for Daytona Speedweeks. Despite starting and parking most of the season, Nemechek managed to qualify for all 36 races.

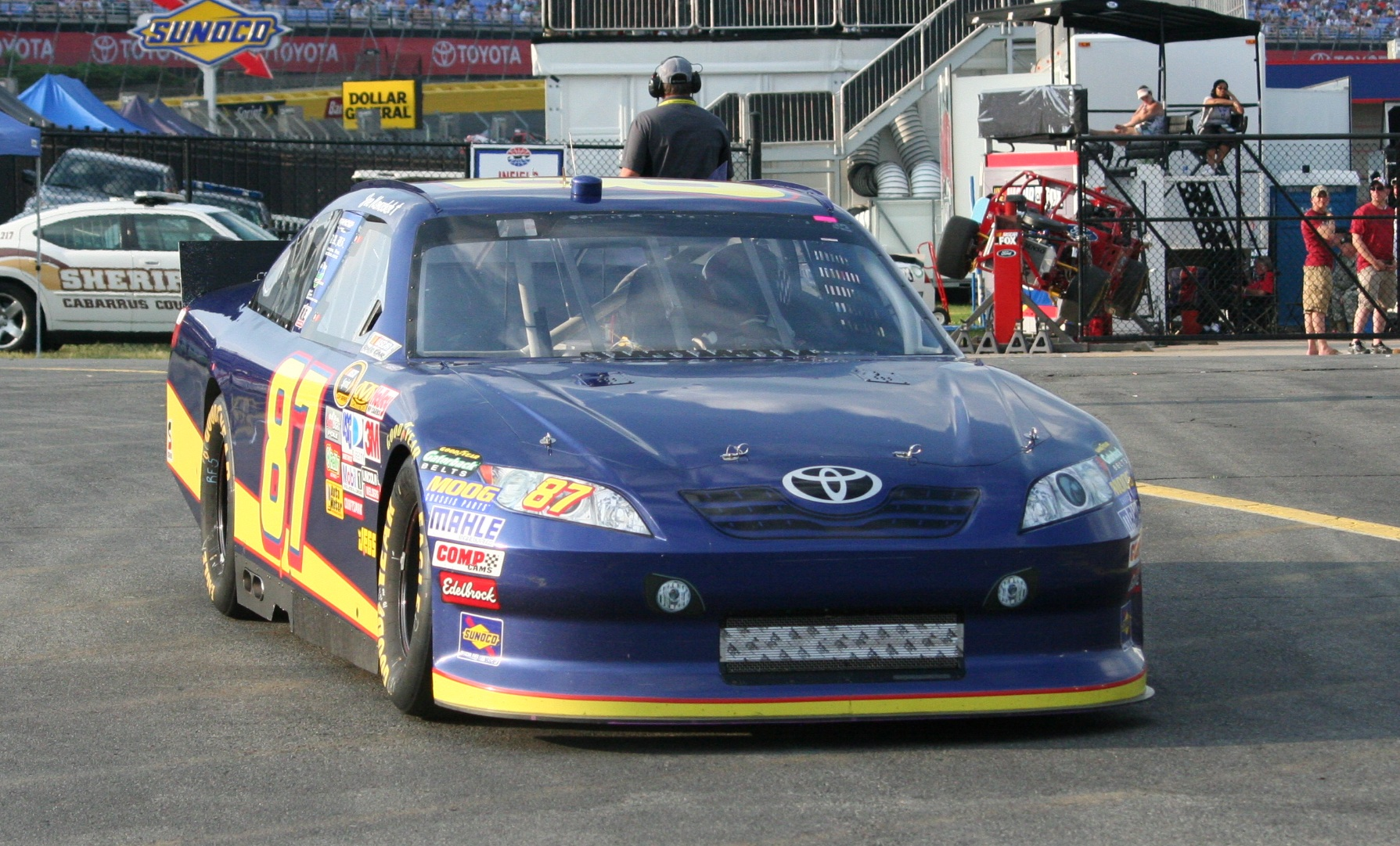
The No. 87 driven by Joe Nemechek in 2011

For 2012, the team plans to remain full-time. Except for the Daytona 500 and Watkins Glen, the team was a Start and Park ride to fund the No. 87 Nationwide Team. For 2013, NEMCO and Jay Robinson Racing have partnered up for the No. 87. The No. 87 qualified for the 2013 Daytona 500 but were knocked out due to an engine failure. They currently have sponsorship from Maddie's Place Rocks, with no plans to start and park. Royal Teak Collections has stepped up as primary sponsorship. The same plans are in place for 2014. The No. 87 is part of the January test session in Daytona. On January 31, 2014, Michael Waltrip Racing announced a partnership with Robinson and Nat Hardwick to run the No. 66 full-time as Identity Ventures Racing. NEMCO-JRR moved most of their Cup cars to Identity's shop, owned by Robinson, with Nemechek as primary driver for the new team. NEMCO-JRR still entered the No. 87 part-time when Nemechek was not scheduled to drive for Identity.

The No. 87, with Nemechek driving, failed to qualify for the Daytona 500 and the Kobalt 400 at Las Vegas, while Morgan Shepherd finished 43rd at Phoenix. The team did not enter again until Talladega, where Nemechek once again failed to qualify. Timmy Hill ran in the No. 87 at New Hampshire. Mike Wallace was initially entered in the No. 87 in the fall race at Talladega, but the number was changed mid-week to the 49, the number Robinson used for many years. The car still used the owner points and attempts from the No. 87 in 2014. Wallace ultimately qualified in 23rd place. NEMCO Motorsports has no affiliation with Identity Ventures Racing or Jay Robinson Racing after Nemechek split from the team and Nat Hardwick, the team's co-owner, was facing embezzlement charges involving his companies Morris-Hardwick-Schneider and Landcastle Title. Should the No. 87 return, the team will probably run Chevrolets like in the Trucks. The No. 87 announced plans to return to the Cup Series in 2015, but withdrew for the Daytona 500 and hasn't run a race since.

2014 driver rotation
87
Driver	rounds
Joe Nemechek	3
Morgan Shepherd	1
Timmy Hill	1

==== Car No. 87 results ====
Year	Driver	No.	Make	1	2	3	4	5	6	7	8	9	10	11	12	13	14	15	16	17	18	19	20	21	22	23	24	25	26	27	28	29	30	31	32	33	34	35	36	Owners	Pts
1993	Joe Nemechek	87	Chevy	DAY	CAR	RCH	ATL	DAR	BRI	NWS	MAR	TAL	SON	CLT	DOV	POC	MCH	DAY	NHA; 36	POC	TAL	GLN; 21	MCH; 37	BRI	DAR	RCH	DOV	MAR	NWS	CLT	CAR	PHO	ATL							N/A	N/A
1995	Joe Nemechek	87	Chevy	DAY; 42	CAR; 29	RCH; 32	ATL; 16	DAR; 33	BRI; DNQ	NWS; 20	MAR; 14	TAL; DNQ	SON; 37	CLT; 20	DOV; 10	POC; 12	MCH; 28	DAY; 38	NHA; 19	POC; 9	TAL; 23	IND; 27	GLN; 31	MCH; 32	BRI; 16	DAR; 25	RCH; 26	DOV; 4	MAR; 30	NWS; 32	CLT; 22	CAR; 9	PHO; 18	ATL; 14						N/A	2742
1996	Joe Nemechek	87	Chevy	DAY; 39	CAR; 9	RCH; 34	ATL; 17	DAR; 31	BRI; 31	NWS; 36	MAR; 26	TAL; 13	SON; 41	CLT; 25	DOV; 25	POC; 21	MCH; 36	DAY; 18	NHA; 35	POC; 34	TAL; 15	IND; 27	GLN; 8	MCH; 27	BRI; 34	DAR; DNQ	RCH; 39	DOV; 25	MAR; 27	NWS; 26	CLT; DNQ	CAR; 24	PHO; 25	ATL; 34						N/A	2391
1999	Ron Fellows	87	Chevy	DAY	CAR	LVS	ATL	DAR	TEX	BRI	MAR	TAL	CAL	RCH	CLT	DOV	MCH	POC	SON	DAY	NHA	POC	IND	GLN; 2	MCH	BRI	DAR	RCH	NHA	DOV	MAR	CLT	TAL	CAR	PHO	HOM	ATL			N/A	175
2000	Ron Fellows	87	Chevy	DAY	CAR	LVS	ATL	DAR	BRI	TEX	MAR	TAL	CAL	RCH	CLT	DOV	MCH	POC	SON	DAY	NHA	POC	IND	GLN; 43	MCH	BRI	DAR	RCH	NHA	DOV	MAR	CLT	TAL	CAR	PHO	HOM	ATL			65th	34
2001	Ron Fellows	87	Chevy	DAY	CAR	LVS	ATL	DAR	BRI	TEX	MAR	TAL	CAL	RCH	CLT	DOV	MCH	POC	SON; 38	DAY	CHI	NHA	POC	IND	GLN; 42	MCH	BRI	DAR	RCH	DOV	KAN	CLT	MAR	TAL	PHO	CAR	HOM	ATL	NHA	57th	96
2002	Ron Fellows	87	Chevy	DAY	CAR	LVS	ATL	DAR	BRI	TEX	MAR	TAL	CAL	RCH	CLT	DOV	POC	MCH	SON; 25	DAY	CHI	NHA	POC	IND	GLN	MCH	BRI	DAR	RCH	NHA	DOV	KAN	TAL	CLT	MAR	ATL	CAR	PHO	HOM	63rd	88
2005	Chris Cook	87	Chevy	DAY	CAL	LVS	ATL	BRI	MAR	TEX	PHO	TAL	DAR	RCH	CLT	DOV	POC	MCH	SON; 28	DAY	CHI	NHA	POC	IND	GLN; DNQ	MCH	BRI	CAL	RCH	NHA	DOV	TAL	KAN	CLT	MAR	ATL	TEX	PHO	HOM	63rd	79
2009	Joe Nemechek	87	Toyota	DAY; DNQ	CAL; 43	LVS; 41	ATL; 39	BRI; 41	MAR; 41	TEX; DNQ	PHO; 41	TAL; 14	RCH; 40	DAR; QL^{†}	CLT; 37	DOV; 38	POC; 41	MCH; 42	SON; QL^{†}	NHA; 39	DAY; 41	CHI; 41	IND; 43	POC; 39	GLN; DNQ	MCH; 39	BRI; 41	ATL; 42	RCH; 35	NHA; 40	DOV; 41	KAN; 42	CAL; 39	CLT; 43	MAR; 38	TAL; 43	TEX; 42	PHO; 40	HOM; DNQ	39th	1608
2009	Scott Speed	87	Toyota											DAR; 26					SON; 37																					39th	1608
2010	Joe Nemechek	87	Toyota	DAY; 43	CAL; 40	LVS; 41	ATL; 38	BRI; 43	MAR; 39	PHO; 38	TEX; 40	TAL; 42	RCH; 43	DAR; DNQ	DOV; 38	CLT; 39	POC; 43	MCH; 37	SON; 40	NHA; 39	DAY; 41	CHI; 43	IND; 40	POC; 40	GLN; 39	MCH; 43	BRI; DNQ	ATL; 38	RCH; 42	NHA; 40	DOV; 41	KAN; DNQ	CAL; 37	CLT; DNQ	MAR; 41	TAL; 27	TEX; 43	PHO; DNQ	HOM; 41	41st	1510
2011	Joe Nemechek	87	Toyota	DAY; 39	PHO; 43	LVS; 42	BRI; 41	CAL; 42	MAR; 43	TEX; 39	TAL; 41	RCH; 42	DAR; 42	DOV; 39	CLT; 41	KAN; 43	POC; 40	MCH; 40	SON; 40	DAY; 30	KEN; 39	NHA; 41	IND; 38	POC; 41	GLN; 40	MCH; 41	BRI; 40	ATL; 40	RCH; 41	CHI; 40	NHA; 36	DOV; 39	KAN; 41	CLT; 43	TAL; 41	MAR; 41	TEX; 42	PHO; 41	HOM; 40	42nd	134
2012	Joe Nemechek	87	Toyota	DAY; 28	PHO; 40	LVS; 41	BRI; 40	CAL; DNQ	MAR; 39	TEX; DNQ	KAN; 41	RCH; 41	TAL; 41	DAR; 40	CLT; 41	DOV; 39	POC; 37	MCH; 40	SON; 43	KEN; 40	DAY; 41	NHA; 38	IND; DNQ	POC; 36	GLN; 29	MCH; 36	BRI; 39	ATL; 43	RCH; 38	CHI; 40	NHA; 39	DOV; 39	TAL; 41	CLT; DNQ	KAN; 40	MAR; 41	TEX; 40	PHO; 39	HOM; DNQ	41st	154
2013	Joe Nemechek	87	Toyota	DAY; 43	PHO; 31	LVS; 40	BRI; 29	CAL; 32	MAR; 34	TEX; 35	KAN; DNQ	RCH; 39	TAL; 39	DAR; 31	CLT; 41	DOV; 31	POC; 42	MCH; 36		KEN; 37	DAY; 27	NHA; 25	IND; 41	POC; 37		MCH; 34	BRI; 43	ATL; 40	RCH; 39	CHI; 31	NHA; 35	DOV; 39	KAN; 41	CLT; 39	TAL; 42	MAR; 33	TEX; 36	PHO; 38	HOM; 35	40th	265
2013	Tomy Drissi	87	Toyota																SON; 38						GLN; 42															40th	265
2014	Joe Nemechek	87	Toyota	DAY; DNQ		LVS; DNQ	BRI	CAL	MAR	TEX	DAR	RCH	TAL; DNQ	KAN	CLT	DOV	POC	MCH	SON	KEN	DAY																			50th	10
2014	Morgan Shepherd	87	Toyota		PHO; 43																																			50th	10
2014	Timmy Hill	87	Toyota																			NHA; 41	IND	POC	GLN	MCH	BRI	ATL	RCH	CHI	NHA	DOV	KAN	CLT	TAL	MAR	TEX	PHO	HOM	50th	10
2015	Joe Nemechek	87	Chevy	DAY; Wth	ATL	LVS	PHO	CAL	MAR	TEX	BRI	RCH	TAL	KAN	CLT	DOV	POC	MCH	SON	DAY	KEN	NHA	IND	POC	GLN	MCH	BRI	DAR	RCH	CHI	NHA	DOV	CLT	KAN	TAL	MAR	TEX	PHO	HOM	N/A	N/A

=== Car No. 97 history ===
A second car, the No. 97, was entered in the 2010 Daytona 500 as a safety net for Joe Nemechek, and was driven by Jeff Fuller, but did not qualify for the race. Fuller parked the car about 5 laps into his Duel race. However, Fuller qualified for the October event in Talladega. Nemechek stated that if both cars qualified (which they did) the No. 97 would start and park, and with the winnings from that car, and the sponsorship from HostGator.com, the No. 87 would be able to run the entire race.

In 2011, Kevin Conway ran the Bud Shootout in the No. 97 with longtime sponsor ExtenZe, but was wrecked early on. He also attempted the Daytona 500, but failed to qualify. Conway did qualify for the Aaron's 499 at Talladega, but only ran one lap and then retired from the race. Conway again qualified for the Coke Zero 400, but also again ran one lap and then retired from the race. Conway then attempted the Good Sam RV Club 500 in Talladega and made the race. However like in the previous races, Conway pulled the car in after completing one lap.

Bill Elliott has taken over the No. 97 car in 2012 with sponsorship from AM/FM Energy for the 2012 Daytona 500. Neither car is locked in the race and Elliott failed to qualify. Elliott successfully qualified for the Talladega spring race, and was in and out of the garage for most of the race. Timmy Hill qualified the car at the fall Talladega race, starting and parking the machine.

==== Car No. 97 results ====
Year	Driver	No.	Make	1	2	3	4	5	6	7	8	9	10	11	12	13	14	15	16	17	18	19	20	21	22	23	24	25	26	27	28	29	30	31	32	33	34	35	36	Owners	Pts
2010	Jeff Fuller	97	Toyota	DAY; DNQ	CAL	LVS	ATL	BRI	MAR	PHO	TEX	TAL	RCH	DAR	DOV	CLT	POC	MCH	SON	NHA	DAY	CHI	IND	POC	GLN	MCH	BRI	ATL	RCH	NHA	DOV	KAN	CAL	CLT	MAR	TAL; 43	TEX	PHO	HOM	56th	56
2011	Kevin Conway	97	Toyota	DAY; DNQ	PHO	LVS	BRI	CAL	MAR	TEX	TAL; 43	RCH	DAR	DOV	CLT	KAN	POC	MCH	SON	DAY; 43	KEN	NHA	IND	POC	GLN	MCH	BRI	ATL	RCH	CHI	NHA	DOV	KAN	CLT	TAL; 43	MAR	TEX	PHO	HOM	56th	3
2012	Bill Elliott	97	Toyota	DAY; DNQ	PHO	LVS	BRI	CAL	MAR	TEX	KAN	RCH	TAL; 37	DAR	CLT	DOV	POC	MCH	SON	KEN	DAY	NHA	IND	POC	GLN	MCH	BRI	ATL	RCH	CHI	NHA	DOV								54th	9
2012	Timmy Hill	97	Toyota																														TAL; 42	CLT	KAN	MAR	TEX	PHO	HOM	54th	9

== Xfinity Series ==
=== Car No. 7 history ===
NEMCO debuted its No. 7 car in 2001. Co-owned with Ed Evans and run under the Evans Motorsports name, it was driven by Randy LaJoie and sponsored by Kleenex. The car won its first race at Daytona International Speedway. LaJoie won another race that season at Memphis Motorsports Park and finished twelfth in points. LaJoie didn't win in 2002, but won a pole at Gateway International Raceway and posted fourteen top-tens on his way to an eleventh-place points finish. Following the 2003 GNC Live Well 250, LaJoie and NEMCO parted ways. Nemechek, Todd Bodine, Hank Parker Jr., and Mike Skinner all took over for one race apiece before Greg Biffle was hired for the rest of the season, winning twice (Which turned out to be his only wins with Chevy) and garnering three pole positions.

In 2004, the No. 7 only ran twice, once with Nemechek and once with Todd Szegedy. Szegedy's qualifying run at Chicagoland was famously interrupted by a giant inflatable Tropicana orange, an advertisement at the track. Szegedy was granted a second qualifying run and timed in a surprising 12th.

The No. 7 car ran more races in 2005 although it was still part-time and suffered from a lack of reliable equipment in comparison to the primary No. 87. Jeff Fuller was the primary driver, with Kim Crosby and others filling out the schedule.

==== Car No. 7 results ====
Year	Driver	No.	Make	1	2	3	4	5	6	7	8	9	10	11	12	13	14	15	16	17	18	19	20	21	22	23	24	25	26	27	28	29	30	31	32	33	34	35	Owners	Pts
2001	Randy LaJoie	7	Pontiac	DAY; 1								TAL; 27																												
2001	Randy LaJoie	7	Chevy		CAR; 32	LVS; 38	ATL; 21	DAR; 26	BRI; 3	TEX; 13	NSH; 4		CAL; 30	RCH; 19	NHA; 8	NZH; 13	CLT; 22	DOV; 24	KEN; 7	MLW; 22	GLN; 19	CHI; 19	GTY; 9	PPR; 33	IRP; 13	MCH; 24	BRI; 31	DAR; 19	RCH; 34	DOV; 9	KAN; 21	CLT; 37	MEM; 1	PHO; 18	CAR; 11	HOM; 21				
2002	Randy LaJoie	7	Chevy	DAY; 12	CAR; 3	LVS; 7	DAR; 27	BRI; 7	TEX; 7	NSH; 6	TAL; 17	CAL; 9	RCH; 13	NHA; 6	NZH; 5	CLT; 32	DOV; 9	NSH; 36	KEN; 13	MLW; 10	DAY; 36	CHI; 17	GTY; 18	PPR; 20	IRP; 13	MCH; 24	BRI; 10	DAR; 20	RCH; 20	DOV; 7	KAN; 17	CLT; 38	MEM; 35	ATL; 15	CAR; 3	PHO; 16	HOM; 6			
2003	Randy LaJoie	7	Pontiac	DAY; 15																																				
2003	Randy LaJoie	7	Chevy		CAR; 4	LVS; 32	DAR; 17	BRI; 8	TEX; 34	TAL; 29	NSH; 32	CAL; 32	RCH; 27	GTY; 35	NZH; 7	CLT; 28	DOV; 26	NSH; 4	KEN; 38	MLW; 11																				
2003	Greg Biffle	7	Pontiac																		DAY; 23																			
2003	Greg Biffle	7	Chevy																							MCH; 21	BRI; 38	DAR; 29	RCH; 28	DOV; 11	KAN; 3	CLT; 1	MEM; 39	ATL; 1*	PHO; 10	CAR; 11	HOM; 13			
2003	Todd Bodine	7	Chevy																			CHI; 31																		
2003	Joe Nemechek	7	Chevy																				NHA; 31																	
2003	Hank Parker Jr.	7	Chevy																					PPR; 15																
2003	Mike Skinner	7	Chevy																						IRP; 7															
2004	Joe Nemechek	7	Chevy	DAY	CAR	LVS	DAR	BRI	TEX	NSH	TAL	CAL; 43	GTY	RCH	NZH	CLT	DOV	NSH	KEN	MLW	DAY																			
2004	Todd Szegedy	7	Chevy																			CHI; 39	NHA	PPR	IRP	MCH; DNQ	BRI	CAL	RCH	DOV	KAN	CLT	MEM	ATL	PHO	DAR	HOM			
2005	Jeff Fuller	7	Chevy	DAY; 43	CAL; 43																																			
2005	Chris Cook	7	Chevy			MXC; 26	LVS	ATL	NSH	BRI	TEX	PHO	TAL	DAR	RCH	CLT	DOV	NSH	KEN	MLW	DAY	CHI	NHA	PPR	GTY	IRP	GLN; 24	MCH	BRI	CAL	RCH	DOV	KAN	CLT	MEM	TEX	PHO	HOM		

=== Car No. 87 history ===
The No. 87 car debuted in 1990 with sponsorship from Master Machine & Tool. Nemechek had five top-tens and was named NASCAR Busch Series Rookie of the Year. After jumping to sixth in points the following year, Nemechek and the team won two races and the Busch Series championship in 1992.

After Nemechek failed to win the championship again in 1993, he left for Larry Hedrick Motorsports at the Winston Cup level. He continued to drive the No. 87 part-time in the Busch Series for several years. After winning the Hardee's 250 in 1994, Nemechek did not win until 1997, when he won the Carquest Auto Parts 300 and the Jiffy Lube Miami 300 in the BellSouth sponsored car.

Beginning in 1998, Nemechek began sharing the car with Ron Fellows. Fellows picked up his first win that year at the Lysol 200, then finished second the next year to Dale Earnhardt Jr., before winning at Watkins Glen the next two years. In 2000, the team got new sponsorship from Cellular One, and Nemechek went on to win three races in 2003. Ron Fellows left the team to drive for Dale Earnhardt Incorporated after 2002.

In 2002, David Reutimann drove the No. 87 for four races, his best finish a twelfth at Memphis. The next year, Hendrick Motorsports development driver Kyle Busch climbed on board for a number of races with ditech sponsorship, posting two runner-up finishes. Reutimann also drove the No. 87 for a few races in 2003, finishing in fifth place twice. Nemechek shared the No. 87 with Reutimann again in the early parts of 2004, before Reutimann left. Midseason, Hendrick development drivers Blake Feese and Boston Reid drove for a handful of races in the No. 87. Feese's best finish was a 33rd at Indianapolis Raceway Park, and Reid's a 26th at Atlanta Motor Speedway. Nemechek picked up a win that season at Kansas Speedway. His lone highlight of 2005 was winning the pole at the season-opening race at Daytona. Ron Fellows returned to the No. 87 at Autodromo Hermanos Rodriguez, where he finished 41st after a wreck.

In 2006, NEMCO ran two races with Nemechek at Daytona and Homestead, where he started finished fortieth and twenty-third, respectively. He ran three of the first four races in 2007 with Brunton Vineyards sponsoring, with a best finish of thirteenth.

The No. 87 came back full-time in 2009. Nemechek drove most of the races with Chad Blount, Dave Blaney, Mike Bliss, Kevin Conway and Jeff Fuller filling in throughout the year for various races. Towards the end of the season, funding got tight and Nemechek was forced to Start and Park most of the races.

In 2010, Nemechek returned to the No. 87 for most of the season with Jarit Johnson, Antonio Perez, and Paulie Harraka driving in the races he did not take part in. However, Nemechek did run the No. 97 while Harraka was wheeling the No. 87 in Montreal. The team received sponsorship from various companies through the first 17 events before HostGator became the primary sponsor for the rest of the season.

For the 2011 DRIVE4COPD 300, Nemechek ran the No. 87 car with DAB Constructors as the sponsor. The team has received other sponsorship from Sin City Motorsports, and AM FM Energy in other various races. HostGator made their first appearance on the car at the spring race in Texas. The team is slowly transitioning to Toyota Camrys, although they have run Chevrolet Impalas off and on throughout the year thus far. With both the No. 87 and the No. 97 entered for the annual race in Las Vegas, it was impossible to change the No. 97 back to a No. 87 after Joe crashed the No. 87 in practice. So, Joe took the wheel of the No. 97 while Kevin Conway started and parked the No. 87 as a backup Jay Robinson car. Nemechek took the reins of the No. 97 again a couple of weeks later in California, while Conway drove the No. 87 with sponsorship from Extenze. Kimi Räikkönen drove the No. 87 at Charlotte Motor Speedway in May 2011, in alliance with Kyle Busch Motorsports.

In 2012 and 2013, Nemechek drove the No. 87 car himself for the full season.

In 2014, with NEMCO focusing on the Truck series, the team only fielded the No. 87 part-time. Nemechek himself drove the car in a few races, as did Carlos Contreras. In the races when NEMCO did not field the car, Rick Ware Racing, RAB Racing, and JD Motorsports used the owner's points to field an additional car for their own teams. The No. 87 car made one attempt in 2015, missing the race at Daytona in February. The No. 87 car returned for 2016 as a Toyota. They would only make the two Daytona races, and after a crash at the second race, they have not made a race since.

==== Car No. 87 results ====
Year	Driver	No.	Make	1	2	3	4	5	6	7	8	9	10	11	12	13	14	15	16	17	18	19	20	21	22	23	24	25	26	27	28	29	30	31	32	33	34	35	Owners	Pts
1990	Joe Nemechek	87	Buick	DAY; 8	RCH; 18	CAR	MAR; 15	HCY; 23	DAR; 19	BRI; 9	LAN; 20	SBO; 20	NZH; 34	HCY; 20	CLT; 38	DOV; 27	ROU; 25	VOL; 6	MYB; 5	OXF; DNQ	NHA; 19	SBO; 21	DUB; 5	IRP; 23	ROU; 18	BRI; 14	DAR; 20	RCH; 16	DOV; 15	MAR; 22	CLT; 27	NHA; 19	CAR; DNQ	MAR; 16					N/A	3022
1991	Joe Nemechek	87	Chevy	DAY; 21	RCH; 9	CAR; 14	MAR; 16	VOL; 19	HCY; 3	DAR; 7	BRI; 12	LAN; 18	SBO; 2	NZH; 18	CLT; 24	DOV; 10	ROU; 24	HCY; 10	MYB; 5	GLN; 2	OXF; 10	NHA; 6	SBO; 17	DUB; 8	IRP; 6	ROU; 6	BRI; 16	DAR; 37	RCH; 8	DOV; 6	CLT; 16	NHA; 28	CAR; 4	MAR; 31					N/A	3902
1992	Joe Nemechek	87	Chevy	DAY; 31	CAR; 12	RCH; 5	ATL; 21	MAR; 2	DAR; 13	BRI; 10	HCY; 4	LAN; 5	DUB; 6	NZH; 11	CLT; 22	DOV; 5	ROU; 2	MYB; 19	GLN; 4	VOL; 4	NHA; 9	TAL; 13	IRP; 1	ROU; 2	MCH; 10	NHA; 1	BRI; 15	DAR; 26	RCH; 5	DOV; 15	CLT; 11	MAR; 5	CAR; 16	HCY; 6					1st	4275
1993	Joe Nemechek	87	Chevy	DAY; 9	CAR; 11	RCH; 2	DAR; 22	BRI; 4	HCY; 3	ROU; 20	MAR; 11	NZH; 19	CLT; 40	DOV; 26	MYB; 3	GLN; 4	MLW; 9	TAL; 28	IRP; 11	MCH; 22	NHA; 2^{*}	BRI; 2	DAR; 4	RCH; 11	DOV; 24^{*}	ROU; 14	CLT; 27	MAR; 14^{*}	CAR; 36	HCY; 22	ATL; 6								N/A	3443
1994	Joe Nemechek	87	Chevy	DAY; 34	CAR	RCH; 1^{*}	ATL; 43	MAR	DAR	HCY	BRI	ROU	NHA; 32	NZH	CLT; 31	DOV; 9	MYB	GLN; 34	MLW	SBO	TAL; 12	HCY	IRP	MCH	BRI	DAR; 11	RCH; 17	DOV	CLT; 26	MAR	CAR								N/A	N/A
1995	Joe Nemechek	87	Chevy	DAY; 12	CAR	RCH	ATL; 38	NSV	DAR; 7	BRI	HCY	NHA	NZH	CLT	DOV	MYB	GLN	MLW	TAL; 4	SBO	IRP	MCH	BRI	DAR; 5	RCH	DOV	CLT	CAR	HOM; 7										N/A	N/A
1996	Joe Nemechek	87	Chevy	DAY; 37	CAR	RCH; 2	ATL; 10	NSV; 6	DAR; DNQ	BRI	HCY	NZH	CLT; 8	DOV	SBO	MYB	GLN; 32	MLW	NHA; 35	TAL; 2^{*}	IRP	MCH	BRI	DAR; 13	RCH	DOV	CLT; 36	CAR	HOM; 4										N/A	N/A
1997	Joe Nemechek	87	Chevy	DAY; 4	CAR	RCH	ATL; 5	LVS; 33	DAR	HCY	TEX	BRI		TAL; 41	NHA	NZH	CLT; 1^{*}	DOV	SBO	GLN; 3^{*}	MLW	MYB	GTY; 29^{*}	IRP	MCH	BRI	DAR	RCH	DOV	CLT; 8	CAL	CAR	HOM; 1^{*}						N/A	N/A
1997	Chad Chaffin	87	Chevy										NSV; 19																										N/A	N/A
1998	Joe Nemechek	87	Chevy	DAY; 1^{*}	CAR	LVS; 3^{*}	NSV; 6	DAR	BRI	TEX; 3^{*}	HCY	TAL; 1	NHA	NZH	CLT; 2	DOV	RCH	PPR												CLT; 36	GTY	CAR	ATL; 7	HOM; 28					N/A	N/A
1998	Ron Fellows	87	Chevy																GLN; 1^{*}	MLW	MYB	CAL	SBO	IRP	MCH	BRI	DAR	RCH	DOV										N/A	N/A
1999	Joe Nemechek	87	Chevy	DAY; 36	CAR	LVS; 2	ATL; 27	DAR	TEX; 38	NSV; 4	BRI	TAL; 2	CAL; 31	NHA	RCH	NZH	CLT; 32	DOV	SBO					GTY; 3	IRP	MCH	BRI	DAR; 5	RCH	DOV	CLT; 8	CAR	MEM	PHO; DNQ	HOM; 1				N/A	N/A
1999	Ron Fellows	87	Chevy																	GLN; 2^{*}	MLW	MYB	PPR																N/A	N/A
2000	Joe Nemechek	87	Chevy	DAY; 2	CAR	LVS; 3	ATL; 33	DAR	BRI	TEX; 36	NSV	TAL; 1^{*}	CAL; 37	RCH	NHA	CLT; 6	DOV; 5	SBO	MYB					GTY; 7	IRP	MCH; 13	BRI	DAR	RCH	DOV; 5	CLT; 5^{*}	CAR	MEM	PHO; 42	HOM; 35				N/A	N/A
2000	Ron Fellows	87	Chevy																	GLN; 1^{*}	MLW	NZH	PPR																N/A	N/A
2001	Joe Nemechek	87	Pontiac	DAY; 32	CAR							TAL; 39																											N/A	N/A
2001	Joe Nemechek	87	Chevy			LVS; 7	ATL; 1^{*}	DAR	BRI	TEX; 4	NSH		CAL; 9	RCH	NHA	NZH						CHI; 4	GTY	PPR	IRP	MCH	BRI	DAR	RCH; 17	DOV; 37	KAN; 35	CLT; 26	MEM	PHO; 12	CAR	HOM; 1			N/A	N/A
2001	Dale Earnhardt Jr.	87	Chevy														CLT; 29	DOV																					N/A	N/A
2001	Jeff Fuller	87	Chevy																KEN; Wth	MLW																			N/A	N/A
2001	Ron Fellows	87	Chevy																		GLN; 1^{*}																		N/A	N/A
2002	Joe Nemechek	87	Pontiac	DAY; 43	CAR						TAL; 34										DAY; 1^{*}																		N/A	N/A
2002	Joe Nemechek	87	Chevy			LVS; 14	DAR	BRI	TEX; 3	NSH		CAL; 41					DOV; 13	NSH	KEN; 25	MLW		CHI; 4	GTY	PPR	IRP	MCH; 11	BRI	DAR	RCH	DOV	KAN; 3	CLT; 3		ATL; 6			HOM; 3		N/A	N/A
2002	David Reutimann	87	Chevy										RCH; 16	NHA																			MEM; 15		CAR; 15	PHO			N/A	N/A
2002	Tim Fedewa	87	Chevy												NZH; 39	CLT																							N/A	N/A
2003	Jeff Green	87	Pontiac	DAY; 36																																			N/A	N/A
2003	Joe Nemechek	87	Pontiac	DAY; INQ^{†}						TAL; 2											DAY; 18																		N/A	N/A
2003	Joe Nemechek	87	Chevy		CAR	LVS; 1	DAR; 34	BRI	TEX; 1				RCH; 36	GTY	NZH		DOV; 1									MCH; 13					KAN; 9	CLT; 36			PHO; 4		HOM; 19		N/A	N/A
2003	David Reutimann	87	Chevy								NSH; 5	CAL; 11						NSH; QL^{†}	KEN; 37	MLW; 5		CHI; 32	NHA																N/A	N/A
2003	Kyle Busch	87	Chevy													CLT; 2									IRP; 33			DAR; 2	RCH	DOV; 15			MEM; 16	ATL; 43		CAR; 7			N/A	N/A
2003	Jeff Fuller	87	Chevy															NSH; 43						PPR; 38			BRI; 15												N/A	N/A
2004	Joe Nemechek	87	Chevy	DAY; 40		LVS; 9	DAR; 28	BRI; 11	TEX; 7		TAL; 10			RCH; 36	NZH	CLT; 21	DOV; 36	NSH				CHI; 31	NHA; 16	PPR		MCH; 36	BRI	CAL; 8			KAN; 1				PHO; 26	DAR	HOM; 8			
2004	David Reutimann	87	Chevy		CAR; 21					NSH; 25		CAL; 15	GTY; 30																											
2004	Blake Feese	87	Chevy																KEN; 41						IRP; 33					DOV; 34										
2004	Todd Szegedy	87	Chevy																	MLW; 21	DAY												MEM; 15							
2004	Boston Reid	87	Chevy																										RCH; 37			CLT; 42		ATL; 26						
2005	Joe Nemechek	87	Chevy	DAY; 14	CAL; 12		LVS; 4	ATL	NSH	BRI; 41	TEX; 12	PHO; 6	TAL; 29	DAR	RCH	CLT; 19	DOV; 10	NSH	KEN	MLW	DAY; 7	CHI; 13	NHA	PPR	GTY	IRP	GLN; 7	MCH; 25	BRI	CAL; 17	RCH	DOV	KAN; 11	CLT	MEM	TEX; 23	PHO	HOM; 10	N/A	N/A
2005	Ron Fellows	87	Chevy			MXC; 41																																	N/A	N/A
2006	Joe Nemechek	87	Chevy	DAY; 40	CAL	MXC	LVS	ATL	BRI	TEX	NSH	PHO	TAL	RCH	DAR	CLT	DOV	NSH	KEN	MLW	DAY	CHI	NHA	MAR	GTY	IRP	GLN	MCH	BRI	CAL	RCH	DOV	KAN	CLT	MEM	TEX	PHO	HOM; 23	N/A	137
2007	Joe Nemechek	87	Chevy	DAY; 34	CAL; 13	MXC	LVS; 16	ATL	BRI	NSH	TEX	PHO	TAL	RCH	DAR	CLT	DOV	NSH	KEN	MLW	NHA	DAY	CHI	GTY	IRP	CGV	GLN	MCH	BRI	CAL	RCH	DOV	KAN	CLT	MEM	TEX	PHO	HOM	N/A	300
2008	Joe Nemechek	87	Chevy	DAY; DNQ	CAL	LVS	ATL	BRI	NSH	TEX	PHO	MXC	TAL	RCH	DAR	CLT	DOV	NSH	KEN	MLW	NHA	DAY	CHI	GTY	IRP	CGV	GLN	MCH	BRI	CAL	RCH	DOV	KAN	CLT	MEM	TEX	PHO	HOM	N/A	0
2009	Joe Nemechek	87	Chevy	DAY; 13	CAL; 35	LVS; 20	BRI; 18	TEX; 39	NSH; 34	PHO; 25	TAL; 11	RCH; 18	DAR; 32	CLT; 36					NHA; 27	DAY; 24	CHI; 24				GLN; 26					RCH; 36	DOV; 35	KAN; 35	CAL; 37			TEX; 36	PHO; 36	HOM; 36	N/A	N/A
2009	Kevin Conway	87	Toyota												DOV; 24	NSH; 23	KEN; 15					GTY; 28	IRP; 20																N/A	N/A
2009	Chad Blount	87	Chevy															MLW; 38																					N/A	N/A
2009	Jeff Fuller	87	Chevy																					IOW; 36											MEM; 35				N/A	N/A
2009	Mike Bliss	87	Chevy																							MCH; 27	BRI; 15	CGV; 34	ATL; 34										N/A	N/A
2009	Dave Blaney	87	Toyota																															CLT; 3					N/A	N/A
2010	Joe Nemechek	87	Chevy	DAY; 31	CAL; 23	LVS; 18	BRI; 16	NSH; 28	PHO; 26	TEX; 19	TAL; 36	RCH; 35	DAR; 23	DOV; 26	CLT; 24		KEN; 25		NHA; 23	DAY; 16	CHI; 15	GTY; 27	IRP; 24	IOW; 19	GLN; 23	MCH; 21	BRI; 32		ATL; 29	RCH; 19	DOV; 25	KAN; 17	CAL; 14	CLT; 41	GTY; 28	TEX; 20	PHO; 28	HOM; 35	N/A	N/A
2010	Jarit Johnson	87	Chevy													NSH; 31																							N/A	N/A
2010	Antonio Pérez	87	Chevy															ROA; 38																					N/A	N/A
2010	Paulie Harraka	87	Chevy																									CGV; 29											N/A	N/A
2011	Joe Nemechek	87	Toyota	DAY; 15					TEX; 24	TAL; 3			DAR; 12	DOV; 19	IOW; 16		CHI; 21	MCH; 21			KEN; 12	NHA; 11		IRP; 7	IOW; 16	GLN; 11	CGV; 21		ATL; 18	RCH; 10		DOV; 30	KAN; 21		TEX; 21	PHO; 12			19th	829
2011	Joe Nemechek	87	Chevy		PHO; 15		BRI; 21					RCH; 19																											19th	829
2011	Kevin Conway	87	Chevy			LVS; 43																																	19th	829
2011	Kevin Conway	87	Toyota					CAL; 22			NSH; 24								ROA; 24	DAY; 25							CGV; QL^{†}	BRI; 29			CHI; 24			CLT; 36			HOM; 26		19th	829
2011	Kimi Räikkönen	87	Toyota													CLT; 27																							19th	829
2011	Scott Wimmer	87	Toyota																				NSH; 13																19th	829
2012	Joe Nemechek	87	Toyota	DAY; 23	PHO; 24	LVS; 20	BRI; 30	CAL; 19	TEX; 17	RCH; 13	TAL; 19	DAR; 11	IOW; 19	CLT; 29	DOV; 19	MCH; 15		KEN; 18	DAY; 22	NHA; 19	CHI; 13	IND; 18	IOW; 16			BRI; 11	ATL; 14	RCH; 8	CHI; 16	KEN; 27	DOV; 17	CLT; 17	KAN; 12	TEX; 20	PHO; 16	HOM; 18			16th	841
2012	Alex Kennedy	87	Toyota														ROA; 33							GLN; 29	CGV; 15														16th	841
2013	Joe Nemechek	87	Toyota	DAY; 18	PHO; 36	LVS; 27	BRI; 24	CAL; 14	TEX; 19	RCH; 23	TAL; 37	DAR; 24	CLT; 32	DOV; 33	IOW; QL^{‡}	MCH; 29		KEN; 33	DAY; 19	NHA; 22	CHI; 23	IND; 23				BRI; 18	ATL; 24	RCH; 29	CHI; 30	KEN; 23	DOV; 23	KAN; 25	CLT; 23	TEX; 33	PHO; 30	HOM; 26			25th	602
2013	Kevin Lepage	87	Toyota												IOW; 19																								25th	602
2013	Kyle Kelley	87	Chevy														ROA; 31							GLN; 19	MOH; 32														25th	602
2013	Travis Sauter	87	Toyota																				IOW; 30																25th	602
2014	Joe Nemechek	87	Toyota	DAY; 12			BRI; 19					TAL; 6			DOV; 17																								32nd	452
2014	Daryl Harr	87	Chevy		PHO; 36	LVS; 30		CAL; 27																															32nd	452
2014	Kevin Lepage	87	Chevy						TEX; 25	DAR; 19	RCH; 39																												32nd	452
2014	Tim Schendel	87	Chevy										IOW; 34			MCH; 40																							32nd	452
2014	Chris Cockrum	87	Chevy											CLT; 35																									32nd	452
2014	Chris Cockrum	87	Ford																								ATL; 29												32nd	452
2014	Stanton Barrett	87	Ford														ROA; 32							GLN; 18	MOH; 33														32nd	452
2014	Rubén García Jr.	87	Chevy															KEN; 33																					32nd	452
2014	Carlos Contreras	87	Chevy																DAY; 34															TEX; 38					32nd	452
2014	Josh Reaume	87	Chevy																	NHA; 34	CHI; 33	IND; 33	IOW; 33						CHI; 37	KEN; 37	DOV; QL^{†}								32nd	452
2014	Josh Reaume	87	Ford																									RCH; 33											32nd	452
2014	Timmy Hill	87	Chevy																							BRI; 34							CLT; 34						32nd	452
2014	Mike Harmon	87	Dodge																												DOV; 39								32nd	452
2014	Jennifer Jo Cobb	87	Chevy																													KAN; 24							32nd	452
2014	Carl Long	87	Ford																																PHO; 39				32nd	452
2014	Milka Duno	87	Toyota																																	HOM; 34			32nd	452
2015	Joe Nemechek	87	Chevy	DAY; DNQ	ATL	LVS	PHO	CAL	TEX	BRI	RCH	TAL	IOW	CLT	DOV	MCH	CHI	DAY	KEN	NHA	IND	IOW	GLN	MOH	BRI	ROA	DAR	RCH	CHI	KEN	DOV	CLT	KAN	TEX	PHO	HOM			57th	0
2016	Joe Nemechek	87	Toyota	DAY; 19	ATL	LVS	PHO	CAL	TEX	BRI	RCH	TAL	DOV	CLT	POC	MCH	IOW	DAY; 36	KEN	NHA	IND	IOW	GLN	MOH	BRI	ROA	DAR	RCH	CHI	KEN	DOV	CLT	KAN	TEX	PHO	HOM			52nd	28

=== Car No. 88 history ===
The No. 88 car debuted in 1989 at North Carolina Speedway as the No. 88 Buick with Nemechek finishing 33rd after an engine failure.

The No. 88 car returned in 2001 at California Speedway with Jeff Fuller as the driver. He started 40th and finished 42nd after an early vibration problem. The car returned at Daytona in 2002 with Fuller as the driver. He started fifth, but finished 42nd after being involved in a wreck early in the race. He ran again that year at Talladega, but crashed again and finished 40th. Fuller and Nemechek ran three races apiece in the No. 88 the following year, finishing last in each one, while Reutimann had a sixth-place finish at Michigan Speedway.

In 2004, Fuller moved to the No. 88 virtually full-time. Despite the full-time schedule, Fuller did not finish a race all year long, his best finish being a 35th at Nazareth Speedway. Nemechek and Wally Dallenbach Jr. drove one race apiece in the car during that season.

In 2005, the team's owners points were transferred to the 7 car's, which were sold to GIC-Mixon Motorsports.

The No. 88 team is now currently used by JR Motorsports, since 2005.

==== Car No. 88 results ====
Year	Driver	No.	Make	1	2	3	4	5	6	7	8	9	10	11	12	13	14	15	16	17	18	19	20	21	22	23	24	25	26	27	28	29	30	31	32	33	34	Owners	Pts
1989	Joe Nemechek	88	Buick	DAY	CAR	MAR	HCY	DAR	BRI	NZH	SBO	LAN	NSV	CLT	DOV	ROU	LVL	VOL	MYB	SBO	HCY	DUB	IRP	ROU	BRI	DAR	RCH	DOV	MAR	CLT	CAR; 33	MAR						N/A	64
2001	Jeff Fuller	88	Chevy	DAY	CAR	LVS	ATL	DAR	BRI	TEX	NSH	TAL	CAL; 42	RCH	NHA	NZH	CLT	DOV	KEN	MLW	GLN	CHI	GTY	PPR	IRP	MCH	BRI	DAR	RCH	DOV	KAN	CLT	MEM	PHO	CAR	HOM		N/A	N/A
2002	Jeff Fuller	88	Chevy	DAY; 42	CAR	LVS; DNQ	DAR	BRI	TEX	NSH																												N/A	N/A
2002	Jeff Fuller	88	Pontiac								TAL; 40	CAL	RCH	NHA	NZH	CLT	DOV	NSH	KEN	MLW	DAY	CHI	GTY	PPR	IRP	MCH	BRI	DAR	RCH	DOV	KAN	CLT	MEM					N/A	N/A
2002	David Reutimann	88	Chevy																															ATL; DNQ	CAR	PHO	HOM; 43	N/A	N/A
2003	David Reutimann	88	Chevy	DAY	CAR	LVS	DAR	BRI	TEX; 24																	MCH; 6	BRI	DAR	RCH	DOV	KAN	CLT	MEM	ATL	PHO	CAR	HOM	N/A	N/A
2003	Jeff Fuller	88	Pontiac							TAL; 43	NSH										DAY; 43																	N/A	N/A
2003	Jeff Fuller	88	Chevy													CLT; 43	DOV	NSH	KEN	MLW																		N/A	N/A
2003	Joe Nemechek	88	Chevy									CAL; 43	RCH	GTY	NZH							CHI; 43	NHA	PPR	IRP													N/A	N/A
2004	Wally Dallenbach Jr.	88	Pontiac	DAY; 42																																		N/A	N/A
2004	Jeff Fuller	88	Chevy		CAR; 43	LVS; 43	DAR; 43	BRI; 37	TEX; 39	NSH; 37	TAL; 42	CAL; 40	GTY; 37	RCH; 38	NZH; 35	CLT; 37	DOV; 43	NSH; 43	KEN; 42	MLW; 41		CHI; DNQ	NHA; 43	PPR; 42	IRP; 39	MCH; 41	BRI; 41	CAL; 42	RCH; 42	DOV; 43	KAN; 43		MEM; 43	ATL; 40	PHO; 43	DAR; 38	HOM; DNQ	N/A	N/A
2004	Jeff Fuller	88	Pontiac																		DAY; 43																	N/A	N/A
2004	Joe Nemechek	88	Chevy																													CLT; 43						N/A	N/A

=== Car No. 97 history ===
In 2010, NEMCO began fielding a second the No. 97 car part-time with Jeff Fuller as the driver. In 2011 and 2012, the No. 97 was mainly used when there was another driver in the No. 87 and was fielded for Nemechek in that situation.

The No. 97 ran as the No. 70 in 2013 when ML Motorsports was not entered, including Jeff Green, Brad Teague, Tomy Drissi, Derrike Cope and Tony Raines. The No. 97 returned with Nemechek driving at the summer Daytona race in 2014.

The No. 97 team was most recently used by the team Obaika Racing, when it debuted in 2015. Currently, no team uses the 97.

==== Car No. 97 results ====
Year	Driver	No.	Make	1	2	3	4	5	6	7	8	9	10	11	12	13	14	15	16	17	18	19	20	21	22	23	24	25	26	27	28	29	30	31	32	33	34	35	Owners	Pts
2010	Jeff Fuller	97	Chevy	DAY; Wth	CAL	LVS	BRI	NSH	PHO	TEX	TAL	RCH	DAR	DOV	CLT	NSH	KEN	ROA	NHA	DAY	CHI	GTY	IRP	IOW	GLN	MCH	BRI													
2010	Joe Nemechek	97	Chevy																									CGV; 28	ATL	RCH	DOV	KAN	CAL	CLT	GTY	TEX	PHO	HOM		
2011	Joe Nemechek	97	Chevy	DAY	PHO	LVS; 23	BRI	CAL; 39	TEX	TAL	NSH	RCH	DAR	DOV	IOW																									
2011	Joe Nemechek	97	Toyota													CLT; 29	CHI	MCH	ROA	DAY; 26	KEN	NHA	NSH	IRP	IOW			BRI; 21	ATL	RCH	CLT; 37	DOV	KAN	CLT	TEX	PHO	HOM; 16			
2011	Kyle Kelley	97	Chevy																							GLN; 26	CGV; 14													
2012	Johnny Sauter	97	Toyota	DAY; 42	PHO	LVS	BRI	CAL	TEX	RCH	TAL	DAR	IOW	CLT	DOV	MCH	ROA	KEN	DAY	NHA	CHI	IND	IOW																	
2012	Joe Nemechek	97	Toyota																					GLN; 27	CGV	BRI	ATL	RCH	CHI	KEN	DOV	CLT	KAN	TEX	PHO	HOM				
2014	Joe Nemechek	97	Toyota	DAY	PHO	LVS	BRI	CAL	TEX	DAR	RCH	TAL	IOW	CLT	DOV	MCH	ROA	KEN	DAY; 27	NHA	CHI	IND	IOW	GLN	MOH	BRI	ATL	RCH	CHI	KEN	DOV	KAN	CLT	TEX	PHO	HOM				

== Craftsman Truck Series ==
=== Truck No. 8 history ===
The No. 8 truck was originally owned and driven by Joe Nemechek's brother John. He debuted the truck in 1996 at the Homestead, where he finished seventh. He ran full-time that year and finished 13th in points. The team was known as CHEK Racing Inc. Three races into 1997, John was involved in a single-truck accident at Miami-Dade and suffered massive head injuries, which claimed his life five days later. The No. 8 truck was retired in John's memory after this, and it was intended that the number would not be used again by the Nemecheks.

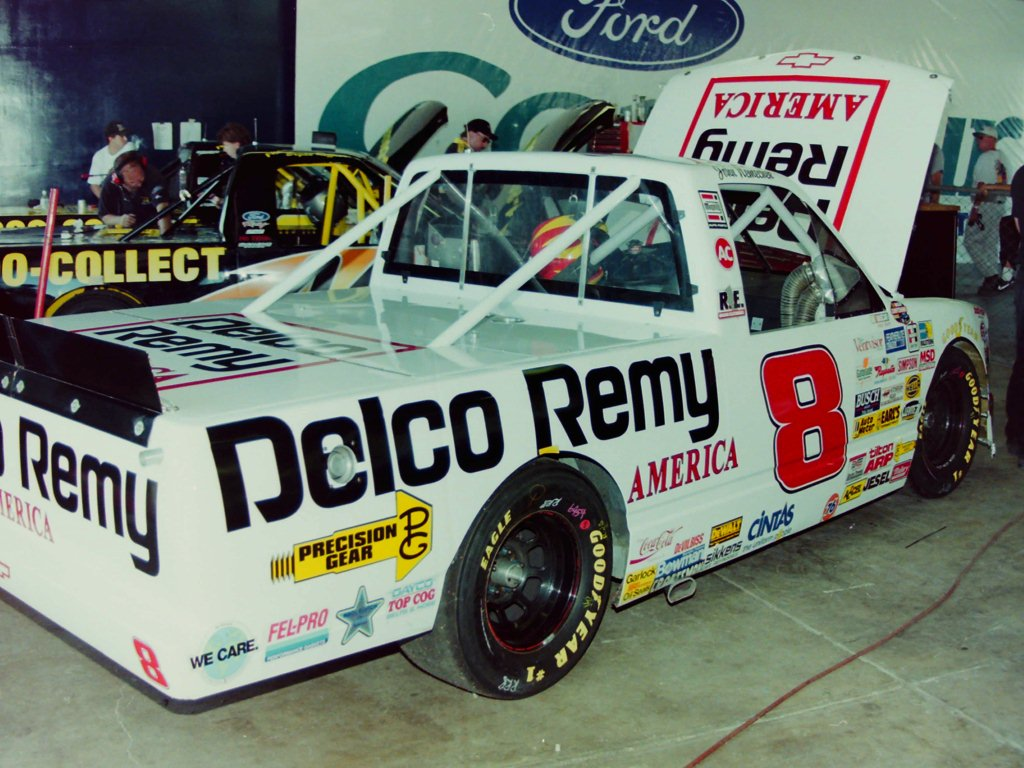
John Nemechek's 1996 truck

However, in 2014, the number returned with Joe Nemechek's son John Hunter Nemechek (named after Joe's brother) ran the No. 8 Toyota Tundra in 10 races, with Joe driving the other 12. SWM sponsored the truck, with SWM owner Sid Maudlin also owning a share of the truck team. The events on the younger Nemechek's NCWTS calendar include Martinsville in March and October, Dover in May, Gateway Motorsports Park in June, Iowa in July, Eldora Speedway in July, Bristol in August, Canadian Tire Motorsport Park in August, New Hampshire in September and Phoenix in November. NEMCO experienced a renewed success, with a best finish of 3rd at Texas by the elder Nemechek. The team recorded eleven top-10s and only finished outside the top-15 on two occasions. The No. 8 finished 7th in owner points, the highest finish for a NEMCO team in any series in nearly 20 years.

In 2015, the season began with the truck again being split between Joe Nemechek and John Hunter Nemechek. Ryan Newman also ran a race for the team at Kansas. Beginning at the eighth race of the season at Gateway, John Hunter took over the truck full-time. At Chicagoland in September, John Hunter Nemechek won his first Truck Series race, passing Kyle Larson with two laps to go after Larson ran out of fuel. It was the first win for NEMCO in any series since a Busch Series race at Kansas in October 2004. Team co-owner Sid Maudlin died in December 2015 at the age of 61.

John Hunter Nemechek returned to the team for 2016, running the full schedule. Nemechek held off Cameron Hayley to win at Atlanta, his second career win. John Hunter Nemechek also won at the Canadian Tire Motorsport Park in a controversial finish beating Cole Custer by 0.034 seconds

It was announced in 2017, NEMCO Motorsports would be fielding a 2nd truck driven by Joe Nemechek in the No. 87 Fleetwing Chevrolet, the first time a father and son competed in a truck series race since Dave Blaney and Ryan Blaney at Eldora in 2013. After finishing 29th, 28th, 22nd, and 21st at the beginning of the season, John Hunter Nemechek got his 1st win of the season at Gateway, he followed that up with a win at Iowa the very next race. Joe and John Hunter will split the 8 now that the younger Nemechek has moved to a partial schedule driving for Chip Ganassi Racing in the Xfinity Series. Financial problems hit the team in 2019, forcing the 8 to start and park several races when John Hunter was not entered, or Joe was unable to find sufficient sponsorship. 2020 saw the 8s schedule greatly reduced as both teams, the 8 and 87, missed the show at Daytona with John Hunter and Joe. The #8 attempted five more races, one with Mike Skeen, one with Joe Nemechek and the other three with JH Nemechek. He scored a top-10 finish at Charlotte Motor Speedway, climbing all the way from 38th to 6th by the end of the event. Skeen finished 23rd at the Daytona Road Course, while Joe Nemechek finished 37th at Talladega after an early crash eliminated him. Rumors circulated that NEMCO had no plans of attempting any races in 2021. These were later debunked by Joe Nemechek, who shared on his Instagram that he would attempt the season opening race at Daytona. Despite not making the race, NEMCO would run the second race of the season with Camden Murphy, finishing 13th. Following the Daytona Road Course Race, NEMCO sold its owner points to the no. 11 Spencer Davis Motorsports team. On March 20, 2023, it was revealed on the entry list for the XPEL 225 that NEMCO will return to the Truck Series for the first time since 2021, with Samuel LeComte as the driver. LeComte previously attempted the COTA races for CMI Motorsports in 2021, and G2G Racing in 2022, but failed to qualify for both.

==== Truck No. 8 results ====
Year	Driver	No.	Make	1	2	3	4	5	6	7	8	9	10	11	12	13	14	15	16	17	18	19	20	21	22	23	24	25	26	Owners	Pts
1996	John Nemechek	8	Chevy	HOM; 7	PHO; 14	POR; 12	EVG; 20	TUS; 17	CNS; 12	HPT; 21	BRI; 20	NZH; 20	MLW; 29	LVL; 10	I70; 16	IRP; 26	FLM; 14	GLN; 16	NSV; 21	RCH; 27	NHA; 20	MAR; 14	NWS; 19	SON; 16	MMR; 19	PHO; 17	LVS; 27			N/A	2615
1997	John Nemechek	8	Chevy	WDW; 36	TUS; 20	HOM; 21	PHO	POR	EVG	I70	NHA	TEX	BRI	NZH	MLW	LVL	CNS	HPT	IRP	FLM	NSV	GLN	RCH	MAR	SON	MMR	CAL	PHO	LVS	N/A	258
2014	Joe Nemechek	8	Toyota	DAY; 8		KAN; 9	CLT; 11		TEX; 3		KEN; 14			POC; 10	MCH; 10			CHI; 9		LVS; 17	TAL; 10		TEX; 8		HOM; 8					7th	750
2014	John Hunter Nemechek	8	Toyota		MAR; 12			DOV; 6		GTW; 15		IOW; 10	ELD; 6			BRI; 27	MSP; 25		NHA; 5			MAR; 13		PHO; 7						7th	750
2015	Joe Nemechek	8	Chevy	DAY; 20	ATL; 10			CLT; 11		TEX; 6																				6th	802
2015	John Hunter Nemechek	8	Chevy			MAR; 29			DOV; 22		GTW; 4	IOW; 23	KEN; 11	ELD; 7	POC; 13	MCH; 12	BRI; 3	MSP; 9	CHI; 1	NHA; 5	LVS; 4	TAL; 11	MAR; 2	TEX; 11	PHO; 2	HOM; 2				6th	802
2015	Ryan Newman	8	Chevy				KAN; 2																							6th	802
2016	John Hunter Nemechek	8	Chevy	DAY; 17	ATL; 1	MAR; 2	KAN; 28	DOV; 15	CLT; 12	TEX; 7	IOW; 12	GTW; 6	KEN; 2	ELD; 24	POC; 9	BRI; 8	MCH; 26	MSP; 1	CHI; 14	NHA; 9	LVS; 16	TAL; 32	MAR; 3	TEX; 18	PHO; 6	HOM; 11				8th	2133
2017	John Hunter Nemechek	8	Chevy	DAY; 4	ATL; 29	MAR; 28	KAN; 3	CLT; 22	DOV; 22	TEX; 21	GTW; 1	IOW; 1	KEN; 18	ELD; 5	POC; 4	MCH; 29	BRI; 3	MSP; 20	CHI; 7	NHA; 20	LVS; 8	TAL; 6	MAR; 30	TEX; 19	PHO; 2	HOM; 15				7th	2206
2018	John Hunter Nemechek	8	Chevy	DAY; 25		LVS; 21	MAR; 1		KAN; 4	CLT; 9		IOW; 27	GTW; 25	CHI; 7*	KEN; 5	ELD; 7		MCH; 3	BRI; 3*	MSP; 2	LVS; 22	TAL; 27	MAR; 30		PHO; 29	HOM; 7				8th	2191
2018	Joe Nemechek	8	Chevy		ATL; 12			DOV; 7			TEX; 15						POC; 10							TEX; 18						8th	2191
2019	Angela Ruch	8	Chevy	DAY; 8		LVS; 16																								23rd	328
2019	Joe Nemechek	8	Chevy		ATL; 32			TEX; 25	DOV; 26	KAN; 24									MCH; 20							HOM; 14				23rd	328
2019	Austin Dillon	8	Chevy				MAR; 13																							23rd	328
2019	Camden Murphy	8	Chevy								CLT; 30			GTW; 28	CHI; 23	KEN; 28														23rd	328
2019	Tony Mrakovich	8	Chevy									TEX; 26					POC; 12													23rd	328
2019	Trey Hutchens	8	Chevy										IOW; 29																	23rd	328
2019	Colt Gilliam	8	Chevy															ELD; 27												23rd	328
2019	John Hunter Nemechek	8	Chevy																	BRI; 29		LVS; 32	TAL; 30	MAR; 7	PHO; 29					23rd	328
2019	Josh Reaume	8	Toyota																		MSP; 26									23rd	328
2020	John Hunter Nemechek	8	Ford	DAY; DNQ	LVS	CLT; 6	ATL; 24	HOM	POC	KEN	TEX	KAN	KAN	MCH; 25																40th	104
2020	Mike Skeen	8	Chevy												DRC; 23	DOV	GTW	DAR	RCH											40th	104
2020	Camden Murphy	8	Chevy																	BRI; 19	LVS									40th	104
2020	Joe Nemechek	8	Ford																			TAL; 37	KAN	TEX	MAR	PHO				40th	104
2021	Joe Nemechek	8	Ford	DAY; DNQ																										N/A	24
2021	Camden Murphy	8	Chevy		DRC; 13	LVS	ATL	BRI	RCH	KAN	DAR	COA	CLT	TEX	NSH	POC	KNX	GLN	GTW	DAR	BRI	LVS	TAL	MAR	PHO					N/A	24
2023	Samuel LeComte	8	Chevy	DAY	LVS	ATL	COA; DNQ	TEX	BRI	MAR	KAN	DAR	NWS	CHA	GTW	NSH	MOH	POC	RCH	IRP	MLW	KAN	BRI	TAL	HOM	PHO				53rd	0

=== Truck No. 22 history ===
It was announced in the fall 2013, that John Hunter Nemechek would make his NASCAR debut in the October Martinsville truck race in the No. 22 Toyota Tundra, co-owned by Joe Nemechek and Sid Maudlin under the name SWM-NEMCO Motorsports.

==== Truck No. 22 results ====
Year	Driver	No.	Make	1	2	3	4	5	6	7	8	9	10	11	12	13	14	15	16	17	18	19	20	21	22	Owners	Pts
2013	John Hunter Nemechek	22	Toyota	DAY	MAR	CAR	KAN	CLT	DOV	TEX	KEN	IOW	ELD	POC	MCH	BRI	MSP	IOW	CHI	LVS	TAL	MAR; 19	TEX	PHO; 21	HOM	N/A	51

=== Truck No. 87 history ===
NEMCO began running the No. 87 truck in 1995 with John Nemechek driving with sponsorship from Burger King and Delco Remy America. John had two top-tens and finished 16th in points despite not competing in four races. Joe took over the No. 87 the following year on a part-time basis. He finished second at Watkins Glen after Steve Park qualified on the pole in the truck, then finished eighth at Phoenix International Raceway. After finishing 27th at Walt Disney World Speedway in 1997, Nemechek didn't return to the trucks until the following year, where he finished sixth at WDWS. Fellows began racing the truck in 1999, finishing third in his debut at Portland International Raceway before winning the following week at Watkins Glen. Nemechek did make an announcement in early June that later in the season, a second truck would be run with Joe driving. The truck was rumored to be numbered as the 87. Ultimately, this truck never ran a race. In January 2017, NEMCO announced that Joe Nemechek and the No. 87 truck would return part-time for the 2017 season, beginning with the NextEra Energy Resources 250 at Daytona, and will be sponsored by Fleetwing. The 87 returned with Joe Nemechek at Gateway, Iowa, and Kentucky. Nemechek failed to qualify at Kentucky and skipped Eldora. The 87 returned at Pocono. The 87 has recently run as a start and park to fund the primary 8 for John Hunter Nemechek. On October 21, 2017 it was announced that Ty Dillon would run in the 87 at Martinsville Speedway without start and parking. The 87 returned at Daytona with Joe Nemechek behind the wheel, before he moved to the 8 truck. It was announced that Tyler Ankrum would run select races in the 87 truck to maintain his playoff eligibility for 2019. He ran 2 races at Iowa and Gateway, finishing 31st and 30th. 2020 saw the 87 only attempt one race, the season opener at Daytona, which resulted in a DNQ with Joe Nemechek at the wheel.

==== Truck No. 87 results ====
Year	Driver	No.	Make	1	2	3	4	5	6	7	8	9	10	11	12	13	14	15	16	17	18	19	20	21	22	23	24	25	26	27	Owners	Pts
1995	John Nemechek	87	Chevy	PHO	TUS	SGS	MMR; 26	POR; 14	EVG; 27	I70; 23	LVL; 22	BRI; 29	MLW; 17	CNS; 15	HPT	IRP; 8	FLM; 20	RCH; 19	MAR; 9	NWS; 22	SON	MMR; 30	PHO; 19								N/A	N/A
1996	Joe Nemechek	87	Chevy	HOM	PHO	POR	EVG	TUS	CNS	HPT	BRI	NZH	MLW	LVL	I70	IRP	FLM	GLN; 2	NSV	RCH	NHA	MAR	NWS	SON	MMR	PHO; 8	LVS				N/A	312
1996	Steve Park	87	Chevy															GLN; QL													N/A	312
1997	Joe Nemechek	87	Chevy	WDW; 27	TUS	HOM	PHO	POR	EVG	I70	NHA	TEX	BRI	NZH	MLW	LVL	CNS	HPT	IRP	FLM	NSV	GLN	RCH	MAR	SON	MMR	CAL	PHO	LVS		N/A	82
1998	Joe Nemechek	87	Chevy	WDW; 6	HOM	PHO	POR	EVG	I70	GLN	TEX	BRI	MLW	NZH	CAL	PPR	IRP	NHA	FLM	NSV	HPT	LVL	RCH	MEM	GTY	MAR	SON	MMR	PHO	LVS	N/A	150
1999	Ron Fellows	87	Chevy	HOM	PHO	EVG	MMR	MAR	MEM	PPR	I70	BRI	TEX	PIR; 3	GLN; 1	MLW	NSV	NZH	MCH	NHA	IRP	GTY	HPT; 15	RCH	LVS	LVL	TEX; 21	CAL			N/A	578
2000	Ron Fellows	87	Chevy	DAY	HOM	PHO	MMR	MAR	PIR	GTY	MEM	PPR	EVG	TEX	KEN	GLN; DNQ	MLW	NHA	NZH	MCH	IRP	NSV	CIC	RCH	DOV	TEX	CAL				N/A	N/A
2017	Joe Nemechek	87	Chevy	DAY; 5	ATL; 24	MAR; 18	KAN	CLT	DOV	TEX	GTW; 28	IOW; 31	KEN; DNQ	ELD	POC; 29	MCH; 30	BRI; 32	MSP; 31	CHI; 31	NHA; 26	LVS; 26	TAL; 30		TEX; 31	PHO; 29	HOM; 29					34th	120
2017	Ty Dillon	87	Chevy																				MAR; 15								34th	120
2018	Joe Nemechek	87	Chevy	DAY; 3	ATL	LVS; 31	MAR; Wth	DOV	KAN; 30	CLT; Wth	TEX	IOW; 31	GTW; 32	CHI; 28	KEN; DNQ	ELD		MCH; 30	BRI	MSP; 32	LVS; 31	TAL; 30	MAR		PHO; 32	HOM; 31					34th	118
2018	Timmy Hill	87	Chevy														POC; 28							TEX; 31							34th	118
2019	Joe Nemechek	87	Chevy	DAY; 16	ATL	LVS	MAR; Wth				CLT; 32	TEX; 28			CHI; 28	KEN; 32	POC; 28	ELD							PHO; 32						34th	119
2019	Timmy Hill	87	Chevy					TEX; 26	DOV	KAN; 28																					34th	119
2019	Tyler Ankrum	87	Chevy										IOW; 31	GTW; 30																	34th	119
2019	Camden Murphy	87	Chevy																MCH; 31	BRI	MSP					HOM; DNQ					34th	119
2019	Tony Mrakovich	87	Chevy																			LVS; 13									34th	119
2019	Timothy Peters	87	Chevy																				TAL; 23	MAR							34th	119
2020	Joe Nemechek	87	Ford	DAY; DNQ	LVS	CLT	ATL	HOM	POC	KEN	TEX	KAN	KAN	MCH	DRC	DOV	GTW	DAR	RCH	BRI	LVS	TAL	KAN	TEX	MAR	PHO					46th	0

== Historic racing ==
In 2021, Nemechek began competing in vintage races with his old cars under the NEMCO banner. The team fields entries in Historic Sportscar Racing and the Sportscar Vintage Racing Association.

Ryan Gemmell, a former NEMCO intern, won the 2023 HSR Class 8 championship for vintage stock cars. Donnie Strickland also raced a Chevrolet Silverado for the team; the truck is also occasionally anachronistically wrapped in paint schemes from Nemechek's Cup career like his United States Army-sponsored car with Ginn Racing.

== ARCA Menards Series ==
=== Car No. 29 history ===
In 2024, NEMCO fielded the No. 29 Toyota Camry in the ARCA Menards Series for Ryan Gemmell at Watkins Glen.

Gemmell returned to the No. 29 Camry in 2025 for the race at Lime Rock Park and Watkins Glen.

In 2026, Gemmell drove the No. 29 at Watkins Glen and Lime Rock.

==== Car No. 29 results ====
Year	Driver	No.	Make	1	2	3	4	5	6	7	8	9	10	11	12	13	14	15	16	17	18	19	20	Owners	Pts
2024	Ryan Gemmell	29	Toyota	DAY	PHO	TAL	DOV	KAN	CLT	IOW	MOH	BLN	IRP	SLM	ELK	MCH	ISF	MLW	DSF	GLN; 8	BRI	KAN	TOL	55th	36
2025	Ryan Gemmell	29	Toyota	DAY	PHO	TAL	KAN	CLT	MCH	BLN	ELK	LRP; 5	DOV	IRP	IOW	GLN; 6	ISF	MAD	DSF	BRI	SLM	KAN	TOL	46th	77
2026	Ryan Gemmell	29	Toyota	DAY	PHO	KAN	TAL	GLN; 9	TOL	MCH	POC	BER	ELK	CHI	LRP; 6	IRP	IOW	ISF	MAD	DSF	SLM	BRI	KAN	46th	73
