= Steve Letarte =

American crew chief and broadcaster

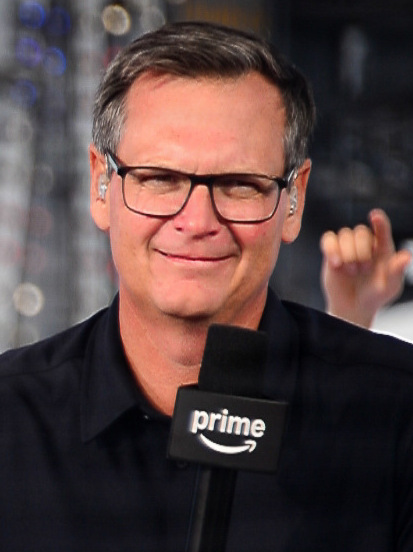
- Letarte at Naval Base Coronado in 2026

Personal information
- Nationality: (United States) American
- Born: Steven Letarte; May 14, 1979 (age 47) Cornish, Maine, U.S.

Sport
- Country: United States
- Sport: NASCAR Cup Series
- Team: Hendrick Motorsports
- Retired: 2014

Steven Letarte (born May 14, 1979) is an American professional NASCAR crew chief and TV sportscaster who works as a color commentator for Amazon Prime, TNT and NASCAR on NBC. He also works as a consultant for Spire Motorsports, a NASCAR Cup and Truck Series team. He was previously a crew member and crew chief for Hendrick Motorsports from 1995 to 2014, retiring after 20 years with the team. From September 2005 to 2010, he was the crew chief for Jeff Gordon's No. 24 car and from 2011 to 2014, he was the crew chief for Dale Earnhardt Jr.'s No. 88 car.

== Racing career ==
Letarte began working for Hendrick Motorsports part-time in 1995. In 1996, at the age of 16, he joined the group full-time. From 1997 to 1999, he worked as a tire specialist for Jeff Gordon's No. 24 team. He then became a mechanic and finally car chief in 2002.

=== Crew chiefing career ===
==== No. 24 crew chief ====
Letarte was promoted from car chief to crew chief after Gordon missed the 2005 Chase for the NEXTEL Cup. He was promoted after 26 of the 36 races in the 2005 season.

In Letarte's sixth race as crew chief with Gordon, he visited victory lane for the first time in October 2005, winning the Subway 500 at Martinsville Speedway, in Martinsville, Virginia. Gordon improved with three top-five finishes in the last five races of the 2005 season.

Entering the 2006 season, Hendrick Motorsports made wholesale changes to the No. 24 team. Gordon fought major handling issues at almost all of the intermediate racetracks, (1.5/2-mile downforce racetracks) which relegated Gordon to run outside the top-ten and even outside the top-fifteen. Gordon finished outside the top-ten at California, Texas, Charlotte, and Pocono – all of which were down-force tracks.

When the series reached the 2-mile racetrack of Michigan International Speedway, near Brooklyn, Michigan, in mid-June, Gordon experienced a huge turnaround at a track that he had struggled at in previous season. Gordon led the most laps and finished eighth in a rain-shortened event; showing an instant improvement in Gordon's downforce program. For the first time since 2004, the No. 24 Chevrolet made the Chase for the NEXTEL Cup.

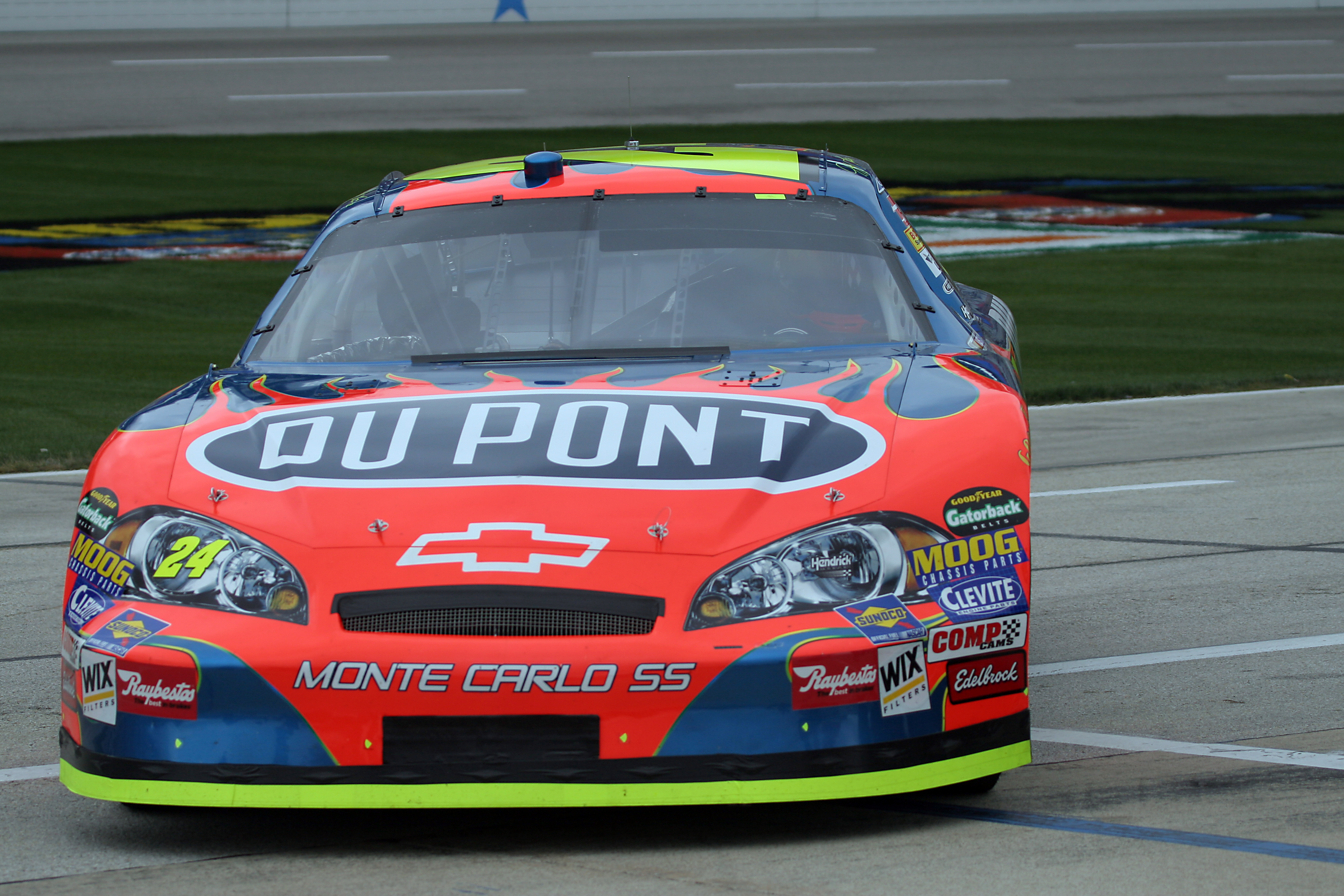
Gordon pulling into the pits at Texas Motor Speedway in 2007

Gordon experienced an up-and-down postseason in 2006. They finished in the top five in both of the first two races, but posted 39th- and 36th-place finishes in the next two events, due to a failed fuel pump in Kansas Speedway and a crash at Talladega Superspeedway. Gordon also experienced an engine failure with 33 laps to go at Charlotte which relegated the No. 24 to a 24th-place finish.

Letarte and his team rebounded with finishes of: 5th at Martinsville, 6th at Atlanta, 9th at Texas, 4th at Phoenix and a 24th-place finish at the season finale at Homestead, and ended the season 6th in the final points standings.

In 2007, Gordon finished the year with 6 wins, Gordon's highest total since 2001, and a series-leading 21 top-5s, the most scored in a season since 1999. The No. 24 team also finished with 30 top-10s, setting a new NASCAR modern era record for most top 10s in a single season. They dominated the points standings throughout much of the year, earning, in total, 353 more points than Jimmie Johnson's No. 48 team, and 706 more points than Tony Stewart's No. 20 team (who earned the third most points of any team in 2007). However, due to the Chase playoff system, Gordon lost the championship to Jimmie Johnson. Their performance in the Chase was exceptionally good however, winning two races and scoring an average finish of 5.1, but it was not enough to outperform Johnson, who racked up more wins and better average finishes than Gordon.

2008 would be a brutal reminder of how difficult racing in NASCAR's top series can be. Astonishingly, Gordon went winless for the first time since his rookie year in 1993. The team posted a respectable 19 top-10s and 13 top-5s en route to a 7th-place finish in the season's final standings, but it was a disappointing follow-up to the 2007 season. Despite being the target of blame from many critics for the team's failures, Jeff Gordon and Rick Hendrick stood by the longtime Hendrick Motorsports employee and Letarte returned at the helm for 2009.

Gordon snapped his career-high 47-race winless streak with a victory in the Samsung 500 at Texas Motor Speedway (one of only two tracks Gordon had yet to win at on the NASCAR circuit at the time) on April 5, 2009. But alas, it would be Gordon's only win of the 2009 season. The team had a strong year however, finishing 3rd in the final standings and leading the series with both 16 top-5s and 25 top 10s. As an organization, Hendrick Motorsports finished an impressive 1–2–3 in the standings as Gordon finished third, Mark Martin finished second and Jimmie Johnson won his record-setting fourth-straight championship.

==== No. 88 crew chief ====
For the 2011 season, the crew chiefs of all of the Hendrick teams except for Chad Knaus were switched around. In the switch, Letarte was reassigned to Dale Earnhardt Jr., while Earnhardt's former crew chief Lance McGrew was reassigned to Mark Martin and Martin's former crew chief Alan Gustafson was reassigned to Gordon.

The pairing of Letarte and Earnhardt Jr. showed strong results early in the 2011 season. On April 3, 2011, Earnhardt Jr. held the lead late in the race at Martinsville Speedway, but was passed with less than 5 laps to go by Kevin Harvick who would drive on to victory. During the Coca-Cola 600, Earnhardt Jr. held the lead on the final lap, but was forced to surrender the lead to Harvick when he ran out of fuel. In the very next race at Kansas Speedway, Letarte had called Earnhardt to pit road thinking that no drivers would be able to make it to the end on fuel. Unfortunately for Letarte and Earnhardt Jr. Brad Keselowski was able to make it to the checkered flag and relegated the No. 88 to a 2nd-place finish. Letarte led Earnhardt Jr. back into the Sprint Cup Chase for the Championship for the first time since the 2008 season. Despite failing to win a race during the course of the season, Earnhardt Jr. scored 4 top five finishes and 12 top ten finishes. The No. 88 car finished the season in the 7th place in points.

Letarte and Earnhardt Jr. continued together into the start of the 2012 season. The season started off strong with a 2nd-place finish in the Gatorade Duel, followed by a second-place finish in the Daytona 500. Earnhardt Jr. finally broke into victory lane on June 17, 2012 by winning the Quicken Loans 400 at Michigan International Speedway, snapping Earnhardt Jr.'s 143 race winless streak.

On February 23, 2014, Letarte and Earnhardt Jr. won the 2014 Daytona 500, narrowly edging out Denny Hamlin and Brad Keselowski. On June 8, 2014 Letarte and Earnhardt earned their second win of the season after Brad Keselowski moved up behind the lapped car of Danica Patrick to remove a piece of trash from his grill. Earnhardt took advantage and won at Pocono Raceway for the first time in his career. The Earnhardt/Letarte pair triumphed again at Pocono on August 3, and later collected what was Earnhardt's first Martinsville clock when the two scored a victory in the Goody's Headache Relief Shot 500 at Martinsvillle Speedway on October 26.

The 2014 season marked the first time Earnhardt posted multiple wins in a season since 2004, and Letarte closed out his career as Earnhardt's crew chief with an eighth-place finish in points. The two finished in the top 10 in series standings three times in their four years together.

==== No. 7 crew chief ====
Letarte briefly returned to the pit box for the 2021 Dixie Vodka 400 at Homestead–Miami Speedway in February 2021, when he took over as interim crew chief for Corey LaJoie's No. 7 Spire Motorsports Chevrolet while regular crew chief Ryan Sparks was held out due to COVID-19 protocols. Letarte had been working for as a consultant for Spire since December 2020.

=== Broadcasting career ===
On January 9, 2014, it was announced that Letarte would be leaving Hendrick Motorsports after the 2014 season to become an analyst for NBC Sports. His first race was the 2015 Coke Zero 400, incidentally won by Dale Earnhardt Jr. After five years with the crew, Letarte said he has seen himself progress as a broadcaster.

Letarte had to miss the 2022 NASCAR Cup Series Championship Race at Phoenix Raceway due to having an emergency appendectomy.

On November 18, 2024, it was announced that Letarte would join Prime Video and TNT's coverage as a color commentator in the next TV contract (from 2025 to 2031) while continuing to work for NBC. This reunited him with Dale Earnhardt Jr. after they worked together in the booth at NBC and as driver and crew chief at Hendrick Motorsports.

== Personal life ==
Letarte and wife Tricia have two children and live in Cornelius, North Carolina. He is the proprietor of RacingJobs.com, a website that helps applicants find employment in motorsports.
