= Ryan Gemmell =

American racing driver (born 2000)

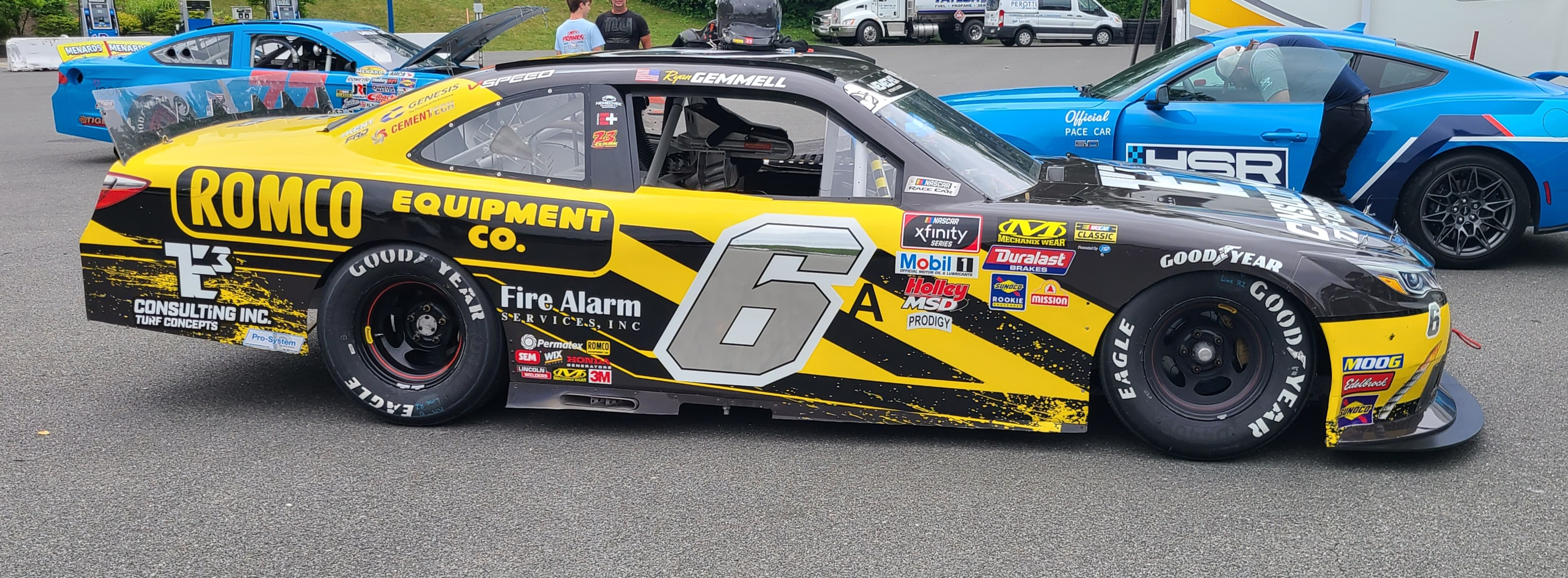
- Gemmell's HSR NASCAR Classic car at Lime Rock Park in 2025
- Born: August 14, 2000 (age 26); Indiana, Pennsylvania, U.S.

ARCA Menards Series career
- 5 races run over 3 years
- Best finish: 58th (2025)
- First race: 2024 General Tire 100 at The Glen (Watkins Glen)
- Last race: 2026 Lime Rock Park ARCA 100 (Lime Rock)
Wins	Top tens	Poles
0	5	0
- Statistics up to date as of July 10, 2026.

Ryan Gemmell (pronounced geh-mull) (born August 14, 2000) is an American professional stock car racing driver. He last competed part-time in the ARCA Menards Series, driving the No. 29 Toyota for NEMCO Motorsports.

== Racing career ==
Gemmell is a frequent competitor in vintage racing, having competed in series such as the HSR NASCAR Classic Series. In 2024, it was revealed that Gemmell would make his debut in the ARCA Menards Series at Watkins Glen International, driving the No. 29 Toyota for NEMCO Motorsports. After placing eleventh in the lone practice session, he qualified in tenth and finished on the lead lap in eighth.

In 2025, Gemmell returned to ARCA, once again driving the No. 29 Toyota for NEMCO Motorsports at Lime Rock Park. After running seventh in the practice session, he proceeded to qualify sixth for the race. Early on in the event, he ran as high as third, though Gemmell was forced off the track but recovered to finish in fifth place, earning his first career top-five finish.

Before the 2026 season, Gemmell competed in Kaulig Racing's "Race For the Seat", competing against 14 other drivers to try to win a full-season ride in the teams No. 14 truck.

== Motorsports results ==
=== ARCA Menards Series ===
(key) (Bold – Pole position awarded by qualifying time. Italics – Pole position earned by points standings or practice time. * – Most laps led.)

ARCA Menards Series results
Year	Team	No.	Make	1	2	3	4	5	6	7	8	9	10	11	12	13	14	15	16	17	18	19	20	AMSC	Pts	Ref
2024	NEMCO Motorsports	29	Toyota	DAY	PHO	TAL	DOV	KAN	CLT	IOW	MOH	BLN	IRP	SLM	ELK	MCH	ISF	MLW	DSF	GLN; 8	BRI	KAN	TOL	84th	36	
2025	NEMCO Motorsports	29	Toyota	DAY	PHO	TAL	KAN	CLT	MCH	BLN	ELK	LRP; 5	DOV	IRP	IOW	GLN; 6	ISF	MAD	DSF	BRI	SLM	KAN	TOL	58th	77	
2026	NEMCO Motorsports	29	Toyota	DAY	PHO	KAN	TAL	GLN; 9	TOL	MCH	POC	BER	ELK	CHI	LRP; 6	IRP	IOW	ISF	MAD	DSF	SLM	BRI	KAN	61st	73	
