= 2026 Lime Rock Park ARCA 100 =

ARCA Menards Series race at Lime Rock Park

Race details
- Race 12 of 20 in the 2026 ARCA Menards Series
- Date: July 10, 2026
- Location: Lime Rock Park in Lakeville, Connecticut
- Course: Permanent racing facility
- Course length: 1.530 miles (2.462 km)
- Distance: 68 laps, 104.040 mi (167.436 km)
- Average speed: 74.173 miles per hour (119.370 km/h)

Pole position
Driver	Carson Brown	Pinnacle Racing Group
- Time: 54.345

Most laps led
Driver	Thomas Annunziata	Nitro Motorsports
- Laps: 59

Fastest lap
Driver	Andrew Ranger	NDS Motorsports
- Time: 55.280

Winner
No. 70	Thomas Annunziata	Nitro Motorsports

Television in the United States
- Network: FS2
- Announcers: Eric Brennan, Phil Parsons, and Ryan Blaney

Radio in the United States
- Radio: MRN
- Booth announcers: Kurt Becker and Kyle Rickey
- Turn announcers: Dan Hubbard (Turns 1–4), Tim Catalfamo (Turn 5), and Nathan Prouty (Turns 6–7)

The 2026 Lime Rock Park ARCA 100 was an ARCA Menards Series race held on Friday, July 10, 2026, at Lime Rock Park in Lakeville, Connecticut. Contested over 68 laps on the 1.530-mile (2.462 km) asphalt road course, it was the twelfth race of the 2026 ARCA Menards Series season, and the second running of the event.

Thomas Annunziata, driving for Nitro Motorsports, pulled off a dominating performance, leading a race-high 59 laps after starting in the second position to earn his second career ARCA Menards Series win, his first of the season, and his second consecutive win at Lime Rock. Andrew Ranger finished second, and pole-sitter Carson Brown finished third. Max Reaves and Jake Bollman rounded out the top five, while Ryan Gemmell, Tristan McKee, Isaac Kitzmiller, Dawson Sutton, and Jeff Anton rounded out the top ten.

== Report ==
=== Background ===
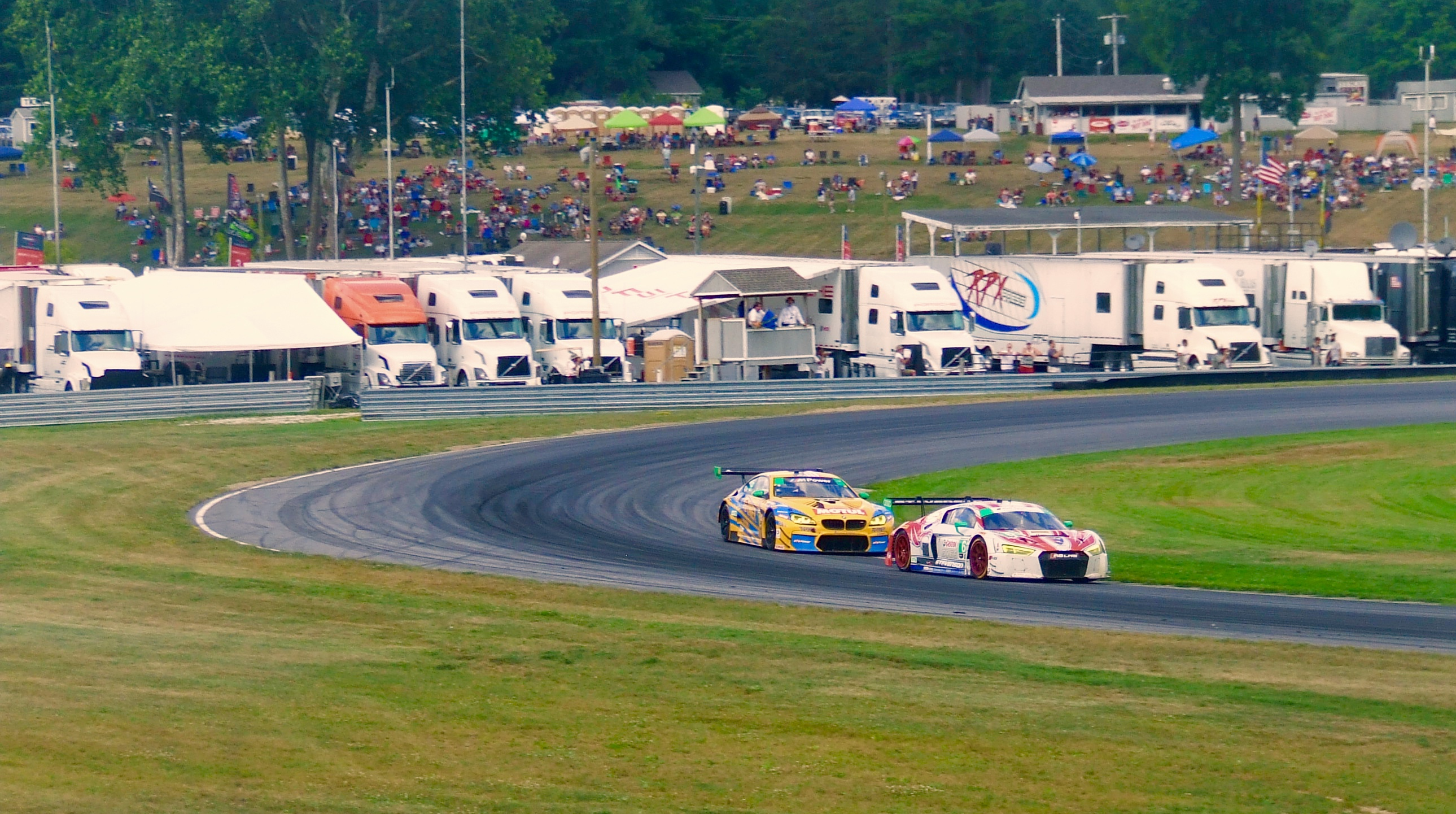
Lime Rock Park, the track where the race was held.

Lime Rock Park is a natural-terrain motorsport road racing venue located in Lakeville, Connecticut, United States, a hamlet in the town of Salisbury, in the state's northwest corner. Built in 1956, it is the nation's third oldest continuously operating road racing venue that is behind Road America (1955) and Willow Springs International Motorsports Park (1953). The track was owned by Skip Barber from 1984 to April 2021, a former race car driver who started the Skip Barber Racing School in 1975. They are now owned by the Lime Rock Group, LLC. It was listed on the National Register of Historic Places in 2009.

==== Entry list ====
- (R) denotes rookie driver.

#	Driver	Team	Make
01	Graham Jacobson	Fast Track Racing	Toyota
03	Alex Clubb	Clubb Racing Inc.	Ford
3	Alex Quarterley	1/4 Ley Racing	Chevrolet
06	Nate Moeller	Wayne Peterson Motorsports	Toyota
10	Ed Pompa	Fast Track Racing	Toyota
11	Chase Buscaglia	Fast Track Racing	Chevrolet
12	Takuma Koga	Fast Track Racing	Toyota
15	Will Robinson	Nitro Motorsports	Toyota
17	Stewart Friesen	Cook Racing Technologies	Toyota
18	Max Reaves (R)	Joe Gibbs Racing	Toyota
19	Corey Aiken	Maples Motorsports	Ford
20	Jake Bollman (R)	Nitro Motorsports	Toyota
25	Peter Portante	Nitro Motorsports	Toyota
28	Carson Brown (R)	Pinnacle Racing Group	Chevrolet
29	Ryan Gemmell	NEMCO Motorsports	Toyota
42	Dawson Sutton	Cook Racing Technologies	Chevrolet
44	Jeff Anton	1/4 Ley Racing	Chevrolet
48	Brad Smith	Brad Smith Motorsports	Ford
53	Andrew Ranger	NDS Motorsports	Chevrolet
55	Isabella Robusto	Nitro Motorsports	Toyota
70	Thomas Annunziata	Nitro Motorsports	Toyota
71	Andy Jankowiak	KLAS Motorsports	Ford
77	Tristan McKee	Pinnacle Racing Group	Chevrolet
79	Isaac Kitzmiller	ACR Motorsports	Chevrolet
86	Jeff Maconi (R)	Clubb Racing Inc.	Ford
89	Bobby Dale Earnhardt	Rise Racing	Chevrolet
91	Ty Fredrickson	Maples Motorsports	Ford
97	Jason Kitzmiller	CR7 Motorsports	Chevrolet
99	Michael Maples	Maples Motorsports	Chevrolet
Official entry list

== Practice ==
The first and only practice session was held on Friday, July 10, at 1:00 PM EST, and lasted for 1 hour.

Thomas Annunziata, driving for Nitro Motorsports, set the fastest time in the session, with a lap of 55.049 seconds, and a speed of 96.656 miles per hour (155.553 km/h).

Pos.	#	Driver	Team	Make	Time	Speed
1	70	Thomas Annunziata	Nitro Motorsports	Toyota	55.049	96.656
2	77	Tristan McKee	Pinnacle Racing Group	Chevrolet	55.091	96.582
3	55	Isabella Robusto	Nitro Motorsports	Toyota	55.396	96.050
Full practice results

== Qualifying ==
Qualifying was held on Friday, July 10, at 2:15 PM EST. The qualifying procedure used was a multi-car, multi-lap based system. All drivers were on track for a 20-minute timed session, and whoever set the fastest time in that session won the pole.

Carson Brown, driving for Pinnacle Racing Group, qualified on pole position with a lap of 54.345 seconds, and a speed of 97.908 miles per hour (157.568 km/h).

=== Qualifying results ===
Pos.	#	Driver	Team	Make	Time	Speed
1	28	Carson Brown (R)	Pinnacle Racing Group	Chevrolet	54.345	97.908
2	70	Thomas Annunziata	Nitro Motorsports	Toyota	54.409	97.793
3	77	Tristan McKee	Pinnacle Racing Group	Chevrolet	54.629	97.399
4	20	Jake Bollman (R)	Nitro Motorsports	Toyota	54.808	97.081
5	55	Isabella Robusto	Nitro Motorsports	Toyota	54.938	96.851
6	25	Peter Portante	Nitro Motorsports	Toyota	55.124	96.524
7	18	Max Reaves (R)	Joe Gibbs Racing	Toyota	55.470	95.922
8	53	Andrew Ranger	NDS Motorsports	Chevrolet	55.479	95.907
9	17	Stewart Friesen	Cook Racing Technologies	Toyota	55.746	95.447
10	29	Ryan Gemmell	NEMCO Motorsports	Toyota	55.772	95.403
11	44	Jeff Anton	1/4 Ley Racing	Chevrolet	55.983	95.043
12	3	Alex Quarterley	1/4 Ley Racing	Chevrolet	56.104	94.838
13	42	Dawson Sutton	Cook Racing Technologies	Chevrolet	56.123	94.806
14	79	Isaac Kitzmiller	ACR Motorsports	Chevrolet	56.159	94.745
15	15	Will Robinson	Nitro Motorsports	Toyota	56.188	94.696
16	71	Andy Jankowiak	KLAS Motorsports	Ford	56.271	94.557
17	01	Graham Jacobson	Fast Track Racing	Toyota	56.339	94.443
18	91	Ty Fredrickson	Maples Motorsports	Ford	56.385	94.366
19	11	Chase Buscaglia	Fast Track Racing	Chevrolet	58.115	91.556
20	97	Jason Kitzmiller	CR7 Motorsports	Chevrolet	58.221	91.390
21	12	Takuma Koga	Fast Track Racing	Toyota	58.969	90.230
22	19	Corey Aiken	Maples Motorsports	Ford	1:01.745	86.174
23	89	Bobby Dale Earnhardt	Rise Racing	Chevrolet	1:02.305	85.399
24	03	Alex Clubb	Clubb Racing Inc.	Ford	1:04.175	82.911
25	99	Michael Maples	Maples Motorsports	Chevrolet	1:05.541	81.183
26	06	Nate Moeller	Wayne Peterson Motorsports	Toyota	1:11.132	74.802
27	48	Brad Smith	Brad Smith Motorsports	Ford	1:14.971	70.971
28	10	Ed Pompa	Fast Track Racing	Toyota	—	—
29	86	Jeff Maconi (R)	Clubb Racing Inc.	Ford	—	—
Official qualifying results

== Race ==
=== Race results ===
Laps: 68

Fin	St	#	Driver	Team	Make	Laps	Led	Status	Pts
1	2	70	Thomas Annunziata	Nitro Motorsports	Toyota	68	59	Running	48
2	8	53	Andrew Ranger	NDS Motorsports	Chevrolet	68	0	Running	42
3	1	28	Carson Brown (R)	Pinnacle Racing Group	Chevrolet	68	0	Running	42
4	7	18	Max Reaves (R)	Joe Gibbs Racing	Toyota	68	0	Running	40
5	4	20	Jake Bollman (R)	Nitro Motorsports	Toyota	68	3	Running	40
6	10	29	Ryan Gemmell	NEMCO Motorsports	Toyota	68	0	Running	38
7	3	77	Tristan McKee	Pinnacle Racing Group	Chevrolet	68	6	Running	38
8	14	79	Isaac Kitzmiller	ACR Motorsports	Chevrolet	68	0	Running	36
9	13	42	Dawson Sutton	Cook Racing Technologies	Chevrolet	68	0	Running	35
10	11	44	Jeff Anton	1/4 Ley Racing	Chevrolet	68	0	Running	34
11	6	25	Peter Portante	Nitro Motorsports	Toyota	68	0	Running	33
12	15	15	Will Robinson	Nitro Motorsports	Toyota	68	0	Running	32
13	9	17	Stewart Friesen	Cook Racing Technologies	Toyota	68	0	Running	31
14	16	71	Andy Jankowiak	KLAS Motorsports	Ford	68	0	Running	30
15	18	91	Ty Fredrickson	Maples Motorsports	Ford	68	0	Running	29
16	17	01	Graham Jacobson	Fast Track Racing	Toyota	68	0	Running	28
17	20	97	Jason Kitzmiller	CR7 Motorsports	Chevrolet	68	0	Running	27
18	19	11	Chase Buscaglia	Fast Track Racing	Chevrolet	68	0	Running	26
19	21	12	Takuma Koga	Fast Track Racing	Toyota	68	0	Running	25
20	23	89	Bobby Dale Earnhardt	Rise Racing	Chevrolet	66	0	Running	24
21	12	3	Alex Quarterley	1/4 Ley Racing	Chevrolet	64	0	Running	23
22	24	03	Alex Clubb	Clubb Racing Inc.	Ford	61	0	Running	22
23	25	99	Michael Maples	Maples Motorsports	Chevrolet	60	0	Running	21
24	26	06	Nate Moeller	Wayne Peterson Motorsports	Toyota	59	0	Running	20
25	5	55	Isabella Robusto	Nitro Motorsports	Toyota	50	0	Running	19
26	22	19	Corey Aiken	Maples Motorsports	Ford	10	0	Mechanical	18
27	27	48	Brad Smith	Brad Smith Motorsports	Ford	1	0	Mechanical	17
28	28	10	Ed Pompa	Fast Track Racing	Toyota	0	0	Did Not Start	16
29	29	86	Jeff Maconi (R)	Clubb Racing Inc.	Ford	0	0	Did Not Start	15
Official race results

=== Race statistics ===
- Lead changes: 3 among 3 different drivers
- Cautions/Laps: 3 for 15 laps
- Red flags: 0
- Time of race: 1 hour, 21 minutes and 18 seconds
- Average speed: 74.173 miles per hour (119.370 km/h)

== Standings after the race ==
Drivers' Championship standings

	Pos	Driver	Points
	1	Jake Bollman	545
	2	Thomas Annunziata	537 (–8)
	3	Isabella Robusto	465 (–80)
	4	Jason Kitzmiller	463 (–82)
	5	Takuma Koga	434 (–111)
	6	Michael Maples	398 (–147)
	7	Bobby Dale Earnhardt	382 (–163)
	8	Alex Clubb	380 (–165)
2	9	Andy Jankowiak	330 (–215)
	10	Brad Smith	329 (–216)

- Note: Only the first 10 positions are included for the driver standings.

Previous race: 2026 Ashley Furniture 150	ARCA Menards Series; 2026 season	Next race: 2026 LiUNA! 150 (ARCA)
