= 2011 FedEx 400 =

Race details
- Race 11 of 36 in the 2011 NASCAR Sprint Cup Series
- Date: May 15, 2011
- Location: Dover International Speedway, Dover, Delaware
- Course: Permanent racing facility
- Course length: 1.0 miles (1.61 km)
- Distance: 400 laps, 400 mi (643.74 km)
- Weather: Showers with a high of 80.8 °F (27.1 °C); wind speeds up to 15.9 miles per hour (25.6 km/h)
- Average speed: 122 miles per hour (196 km/h)

Pole position
Driver	Jimmie Johnson	Hendrick Motorsports

Most laps led
Driver	Jimmie Johnson	Hendrick Motorsports
- Laps: 207

Winner
No. 17	Matt Kenseth	Roush Fenway Racing

Television in the United States
- Network: Fox Broadcasting Company
- Announcers: Mike Joy, Darrell Waltrip and Larry McReynolds

The 2011 FedEx 400 benefiting Autism Speaks was held on 15 May 2011 at Dover International Speedway in Dover, Delaware. Contested over 400 laps on the 1-mile (1.6 km) concrete oval, it was the eleventh race of the 2011 Sprint Cup Series season. The race was won by Matt Kenseth for the Roush Fenway Racing team with Mark Martin second ahead of Marcos Ambrose.

Previous race: 2011 Showtime Southern 500	Sprint Cup Series; 2011 season	Next race: 2011 Coca-Cola 600
