= 2011 Coca-Cola 600 =

Auto race held at Charlotte, USA in 2011

Race details
- Race 12 of 36 in the 2011 NASCAR Sprint Cup Series
- 2011 Coca-Cola 600 program cover, with artwork by NASCAR artist Sam Bass. "BIG!"
- Date: May 29, 2011
- Location: Charlotte Motor Speedway, Concord, North Carolina
- Course: Permanent racing facility
- Course length: 1.5 miles (2.4 km)
- Distance: 402 laps, 603 mi (970 km)
- Weather: Sunshine with a high around 85; wind out of the SSW at 5 mph.
- Average speed: 132.412 miles per hour (213.096 km/h)

Pole position
Driver	Brad Keselowski	Penske Racing
- Time: 28.112

Most laps led
Driver	Matt Kenseth	Roush Fenway Racing
- Laps: 103

Winner
No. 29	Kevin Harvick	Richard Childress Racing

Television in the United States
- Network: Fox Broadcasting Company
- Announcers: Mike Joy, Darrell Waltrip and Larry McReynolds

The logo for the 2011 Coca-Cola 600.

The 2011 Coca-Cola 600, the 52nd running of the event, was a NASCAR Sprint Cup Series motor race held on May 29, 2011, at Charlotte Motor Speedway in Concord, North Carolina. Contested over 400 laps on the 1.5-mile (2.4 km) asphalt quad-oval, it was the twelfth race of the 2011 Sprint Cup Series season. The race was won by Kevin Harvick for the Richard Childress Racing team. David Ragan finished second, and Joey Logano clinched third.

There were 14 cautions and 38 lead changes among 19 different drivers throughout the course of the race. The result moved Harvick to the second position in the Drivers' Championship. He remained 36 points behind first place driver Carl Edwards and one ahead of Jimmie Johnson in third. In the Manufacturers' Championship, Chevrolet was first with 83 points, six ahead of Ford. Toyota was third with 64 points, 24 points ahead of Dodge. The race was extended to 402 laps and 603 miles (970 km), making it the longest race in NASCAR history at the time. 145,000 people attended the race, while 10.1 million watched it on television.

== Report ==
Charlotte Motor Speedway, the venue where the race was held.

=== Background ===
Charlotte Motor Speedway is one of ten intermediate to hold NASCAR races. The standard track at Charlotte Motor Speedway is a four-turn quad-oval track that is 1.5 miles (2.4 km) long. The track's turns are banked at twenty-four degrees, while the front stretch, the location of the finish line, is five degrees. The back stretch, opposite of the front, also had a five degree banking. The racetrack has seats for 140,000 spectators.

Before the race, Ford driver Carl Edwards led the Drivers' Championship with 416 points; Chevrolet driver Jimmie Johnson was second with 392 points, 24 points behind Edwards. Kyle Busch followed in third with 379 points, 15 ahead of Dale Earnhardt Jr. and 17 ahead of Kevin Harvick in fourth and fifth. Matt Kenseth with 342 was two points ahead of Ryan Newman in seventh. Clint Bowyer, Kurt Busch and Tony Stewart rounded out the top ten positions. In the Manufacturers' Championship, Chevrolet was leading with 74 points, three points ahead of Ford. Toyota, with 60 points, was 37 points ahead of Dodge in the battle for third. Kurt Busch was the race's defending champion.

The Coca-Cola 600 was conceived by race car driver Curtis Turner, who built the Charlotte Motor Speedway. It was first held in 1960 in an attempt by NASCAR to stage a Memorial Day weekend race to compete with the open-wheel Indianapolis 500; the two races were held together on the same day starting from 1974. The race is the longest in terms of distance on the NASCAR calendar and is considered by several drivers to be one of the sport's most important races alongside the Daytona 500, the Brickyard 400 and the Southern 500. The long distance makes it the most physically demanding event in NASCAR, and teams adapt to changing track conditions because the race occurs between late afternoon and evening. It was known as the World 600 until 1984 when The Coca-Cola Company purchased the naming rights to the race and renamed it the Coca-Cola World 600 in 1985. It has been called the Coca-Cola 600 every year since 1986 except for 2002 when the name changed to Coca-Cola Racing Family 600.

=== Entry list ===
Car	Driver	Manufacturer	Team
00	David Reutimann	Toyota	Michael Waltrip Racing
1	Jamie McMurray	Chevrolet	Earnhardt Ganassi Racing
2	Brad Keselowski	Dodge	Penske Racing
4	Kasey Kahne	Toyota	Red Bull Racing Team
5	Mark Martin	Chevrolet	Hendrick Motorsports
6	David Ragan	Ford	Roush Fenway Racing
7	Robby Gordon	Dodge	Robby Gordon Motorsports
09	Landon Cassill	Chevrolet	Phoenix Racing
9	Marcos Ambrose	Ford	Richard Petty Motorsports
11	Denny Hamlin	Toyota	Joe Gibbs Racing
13	Casey Mears	Toyota	Germain Racing
14	Tony Stewart	Chevrolet	Stewart–Haas Racing
16	Greg Biffle	Ford	Roush Fenway Racing
17	Matt Kenseth	Ford	Roush Fenway Racing
18	Kyle Busch	Toyota	Joe Gibbs Racing
20	Joey Logano	Toyota	Joe Gibbs Racing
21	Ricky Stenhouse Jr.	Ford	Wood Brothers Racing
22	Kurt Busch	Dodge	Penske Racing
24	Jeff Gordon	Chevrolet	Hendrick Motorsports
27	Paul Menard	Chevrolet	Richard Childress Racing
29	Kevin Harvick	Chevrolet	Richard Childress Racing
30	David Stremme	Chevrolet	Inception Motorsports
31	Jeff Burton	Chevrolet	Richard Childress Racing
32	Mike Bliss	Ford	FAS Lane Racing
33	Clint Bowyer	Chevrolet	Richard Childress Racing
34	David Gilliland	Ford	Front Row Motorsports
36	Dave Blaney	Chevrolet	Tommy Baldwin Racing
37	Tony Raines	Ford	Max Q Motorsports
38	Travis Kvapil	Ford	Front Row Motorsports
39	Ryan Newman	Chevrolet	Stewart–Haas Racing
42	Juan Pablo Montoya	Chevrolet	Earnhardt Ganassi Racing
43	A.J. Allmendinger	Ford	Richard Petty Motorsports
46	J.J. Yeley	Chevrolet	Whitney Motorsports
47	Bobby Labonte	Toyota	JTG Daugherty Racing
48	Jimmie Johnson	Chevrolet	Hendrick Motorsports
50	T.J. Bell	Toyota	LTD Powersports
56	Martin Truex Jr.	Toyota	Michael Waltrip Racing
60	Mike Skinner	Toyota	Germain Racing
66	Michael McDowell	Toyota	HP Racing
71	Andy Lally	Ford	TRG Motorsports
77	Scott Wimmer	Dodge	Robby Gordon Motorsports
78	Regan Smith	Chevrolet	Furniture Row Racing
81	Scott Riggs	Chevrolet	Whitney Motorsports
83	Brian Vickers	Toyota	Red Bull Racing Team
87	Joe Nemechek	Toyota	NEMCO Motorsports
88	Dale Earnhardt Jr.	Chevrolet	Hendrick Motorsports
95	David Starr	Ford	Leavine Family Racing
99	Carl Edwards	Ford	Roush Fenway Racing

=== Practice and qualifying ===
Three practice sessions were held before the race; the first on Thursday, which lasted 90 minutes. The second and third were both on Saturday. The first Saturday practice lasted 45 minutes, while the second lasted 60. Jeff Burton was quickest with a time of 28.635 seconds in the first session, 0.084 seconds faster than Edwards. Johnson was just off Edwards' pace, followed by Denny Hamlin, Ryan Newman, and Brad Keselowski. Kasey Kahne was seventh, still within a second of Burton's time.

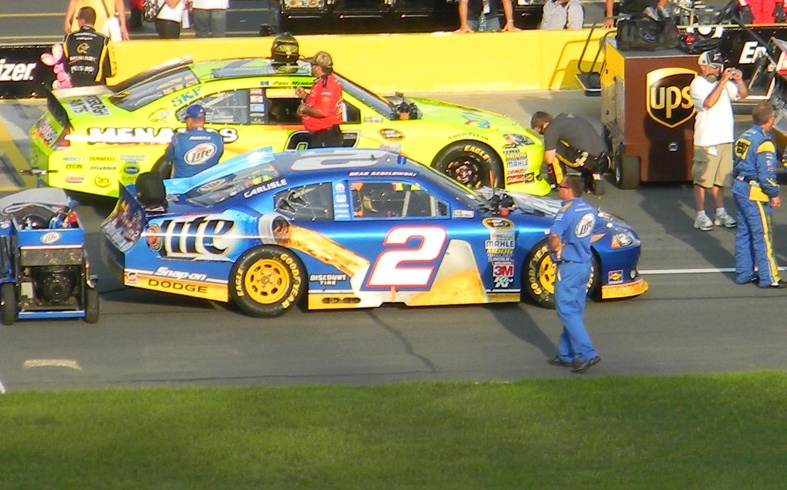
Brad Keselowski earned the pole position for Penske Racing

Forty-eight cars were entered for qualifying, but only forty-three could qualify for the race because of NASCAR's qualifying procedure. Keselowski clinched the second pole position of his career, with a time of 28.112 seconds. He was joined on the front row of the grid by A. J. Allmendinger. Edwards qualified third, Hamlin took fourth, and Burton started fifth. Johnson, David Reutimann, David Ragan, Ricky Stenhouse Jr. and Clint Bowyer rounded out the top ten. The five drivers that failed to qualify for the race were Andy Lally, T. J. Bell, Scott Wimmer, Tony Raines, and Scott Riggs. Once the qualifying session completed, Keselowski commented, "It’s an important weekend for Penske Racing and an important weekend for the country. The 600 is a big race for NASCAR, it has a lot of tradition and to add my name to the list of pole winners is pretty special but I’d like to add it to those who have won it. This is the first step to doing that."

In the second practice session, Paul Menard was fastest with a time of 28.610 seconds, less than six-hundredths of a second quicker than second-placed Kurt Busch. Earnhardt Jr. took third place, ahead of Hamlin, Kahne and Mark Martin. In the third and final practice, Reutimann was quickest with a time of 29.271 seconds. Marcos Ambrose followed in second, ahead of Menard and Kyle Busch. Burton was fifth quickest, with a time of 29.385 seconds. Hamlin, Greg Biffle, Martin Truex Jr., Kurt Busch, and Ragan rounded out the top ten positions.

=== Race ===
The race, the twelfth in the season, began at 6:00 p.m. EDT and was televised live in the United States on Fox. The conditions on the grid were dry before the race with the air temperature at 85 °F (29 °C). Jim Daly, president of Focus on the Family, began pre-race ceremonies, by giving the invocation. Capitol Nashville recording artist Darius Rucker performed the national anthem. Then, John Falkenbury, President of the USO, Master Sergeant Spanky Gibson, Gene Gibson and Mary Gibson gave the command for drivers to start their engines.

Keselowski retained his pole position lead through the first lap. By the end of the following lap, Edwards moved to up to second, as Clint Bowyer moved up to the eighth position. On the same lap, Stenhouse Jr. collided into the wall, but sustained minor damage. Two laps later, Mike Skinner also collided into the wall. On the eighth lap, Edwards passed Keselowski to become the leader of the race. One lap later, Burton moved up to fourth, as Stenhouse Jr. reported no damage to his car resulting from the collision. At lap 12, Jeff Gordon moved up three positions to eighth, while Skinner retired from the race. Three laps later, Reutimann moved up to sixth after passing Johnson. On the 19th lap, Truex Jr. moved to twelfth. On the 24th lap, Allmendinger passed Keselowski to move to the second position. Six laps later, Biffle reported that the cool box (air conditioning box) would have to be replaced during their first pit stop. By the 37th lap, Edwards had a 2.6 second lead over Allmendinger.

On the 42nd lap, Jamie McMurray pitted, as Burton moved up to the third position. On the following lap, Reutimann and Truex Jr. pitted, one lap before Allmendinger. Two laps later, Johnson, Gordon, and Earnhardt Jr. pitted, as Edwards took the lead. Once the pit stop session completed, Edwards was the leader, ahead of Allmendinger and Kenseth. On the following lap, Hamlin passed Kenseth to take the third position. Johnson passed Keselowski to take over the fifth position at the 57th lap. On lap 60, Earnhardt Jr. passed Gordon to move up into tenth. By the 63rd lap, Edwards had expanded his lead over Allmendinger to 2.7 seconds. Six laps later, Earnhardt Jr. moved up to the eighth position, as Edwards continued to expand his over Allmendinger to 4.4 seconds. On the 74th lap, the first caution was given because of debris on the track. During the caution, most of the race leaders pitted. At the lap 79 restart, Burton was the leader, ahead of Edwards, Hamlin, Kenseth and Johnson.

On the following lap, Hamlin passed Edwards to take over the second position, one lap before he would pass Burton to become the leader. On the 82nd lap, Johnson moved up to third after passing Edwards. Two laps later, Johnson passed Burton to take over the second position, as Robby Gordon drove to the garage. On lap 85, Kenseth moved up to the third position. Burton, who restarted in the first position, had fallen to the ninth position by the 89th lap. Three laps later, Earnhardt Jr. moved up to the sixth position. Afterwards, McMurray passed Jeff Gordon to take over tenth. Five laps later, the second caution period began after Bobby Labonte spun sideways. Most of the race leaders decided to pit during the caution. At the lap 103 restart, Ragan became the leader, ahead of Reutimann and Juan Pablo Montoya in second and third. One lap later, Montoya passed Reutimann to move to the second position, a lap before Kenseth, who restarted fifth, overtook Montoya to take the position.

On the 108th lap, Kenseth passed Ragan to move into the first position. Four laps later, Edwards passed Montoya to claim the fourth position, as Kyle Busch passed Reutimann for ninth. By lap 125, Kenseth had a 3.7 second lead over Hamlin. Thirteen laps later, Edwards passed Hamlin to take over the second position, as Kyle Busch moved up to ninth. On lap 145, Reutimann pitted, marking the beginning of the pit stop session. The session lasted four laps, and Kenseth remained the leader ahead of Edwards. On lap 151, Ambrose moved up to the fourth position after passing Ragan. On the 160th, Kurt Busch reported a loose wheel, and immediately pitted. Eight laps later, McMurray moved up to the eighth position. On lap 171, the third caution period began because of debris on the track. During the caution, most of the race leaders pitted. At the lap 175 restart, Ambrose became the leader, ahead of McMurray and Montoya. In the next two laps, McMurray moved to first, while Kenseth took over the second position. On lap 181, Kenseth reclaimed the first position from McMurray, one lap before McMurray's engine failed to cause the fourth caution. After the restart, the fifth caution was given after Casey Mears and Landon Cassill collided.

At the lap 193 restart, Kenseth remained the leader ahead of Ambrose. On the following lap, Ambrose took the lead from Kenseth, but would fall to second after he retook the position on lap 199. By lap 213, Kenseth had a 2.5 second lead over Ambrose, as Johnson moved up to 11th. Eight laps later, Harvick pitted, two laps before Ambrose and three before Edwards. On lap 133, the sixth caution was given after Mike Bliss stalled his car. Most of the race leaders pitted during the caution. At the lap 240 restart, Ambrose was the leader, as Menard collided into the wall to cause the seventh caution. Five laps later, the Ambrose restarted in the first position. On the 250th lap, Earnhardt Jr. passed Johnson to take over the fifth position. Seven laps later, Kenseth moved up to the seventh position. Kenseth continued to move up, passing Hamlin for third by lap 275.

Three laps later, another pit stop session began, as Ragan pitted. Pit stops continued until the caution was given for debris on lap 282. At the lap 287 restart, Kyle Busch was the leader ahead of Ambrose and Ragan. Two laps later, the ninth caution was given because David Starr collided into the wall. Two laps after the restart, the tenth caution was given after Cassill ran through the grass on the front straightaway. During the caution, Hamlin pitted to replace a carburetor. At the lap 301 restart, Kyle Busch continued to lead as Martin, Newman, and Gilliland collided into each other, causing the 11th caution. Most of the race leaders pitted during the caution, as Jeff Gordon became the leader.

On the 314th lap, Biffle moved up to the seventh position, as Logano and Stenhouse Jr. collided into the wall, but sustained minor damage. Four laps later, the 12th caution was given after Kyle Busch spun sideways. Some of the race leaders decided to pit during the caution. However, Kahne, Harvick, and Earnhardt Jr. didn't pit and became the race leaders on the restart. On lap 328, Earnhardt Jr. reclaimed the third position from Biffle. Two laps later, Biffle passed Earnhardt Jr. for third, but lost the position to Harvick on the same lap. On the 333rd lap, Johnson moved up to the ninth position, as Keselowski moved up to fifth. Seven laps later, Ambrose made an unscheduled pit stop. Three laps later, the 13th caution was given after Kyle Busch spun for the second time. After pit stops, Gordon was the leader on the restart, as Kyle Busch drove to the garage. On lap 351, Biffle became the leader after passing Gordon.

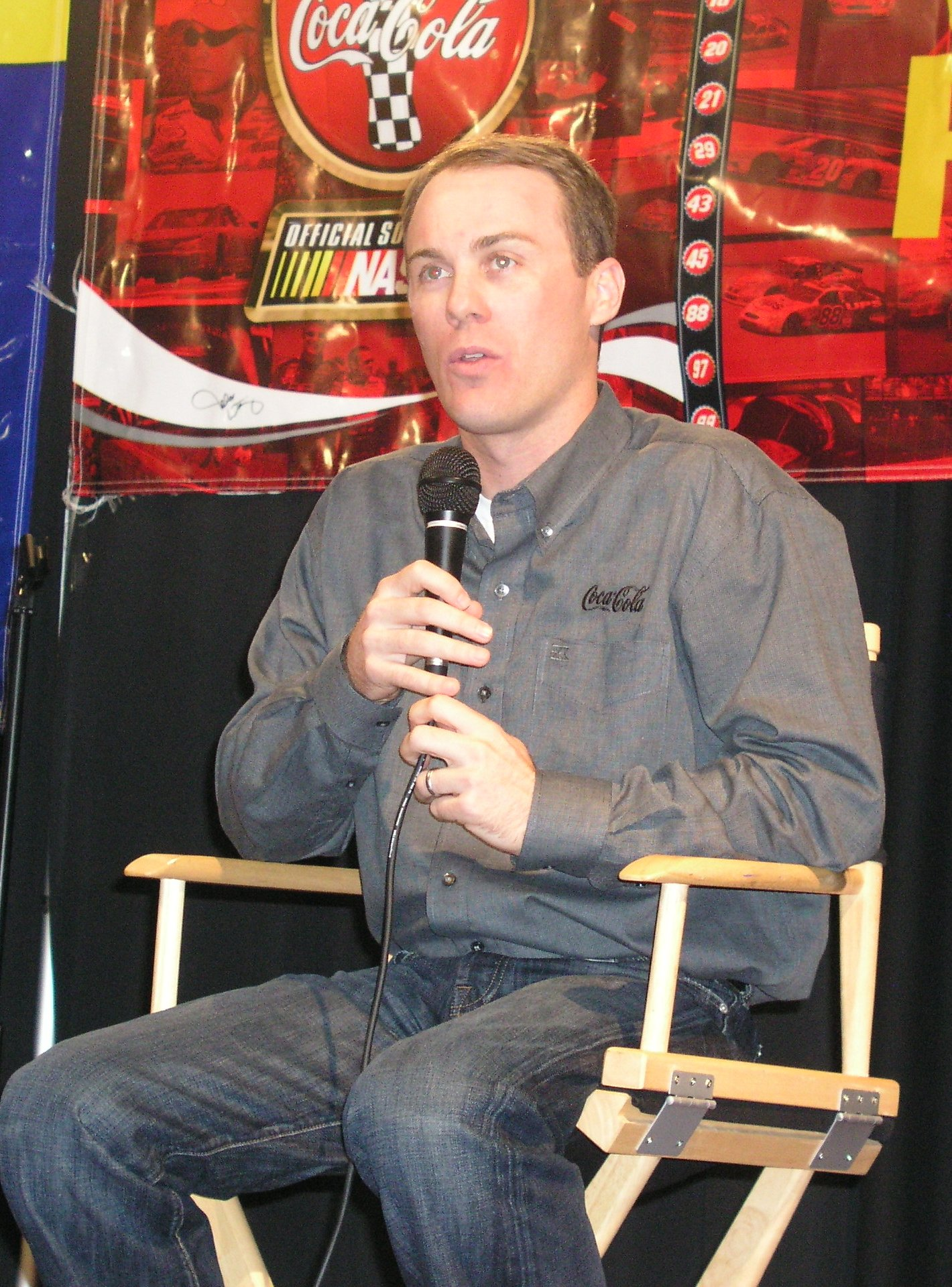
Kevin Harvick won the race after overtaking Dale Earnhardt Jr. on the last lap

Four laps later, Gordon lost another position after being passed by Kahne. Afterwards, Gordon continued to lose positions as Ragan passed him on lap 360. Three laps later, Hamlin claimed the fifth position after passing Kenseth. Thirteen laps later, Earnhardt Jr. moved up to the third position, as Kenseth moved to fourth after passing Ragan. With seven laps remaining, Kenseth and Gordon pitted for fuel. On lap 396, Johnson's engine failed, causing the 14th caution. Biffle also pitted during the caution, while Kahne tried to race without refueling. At the lap 400 restart, Kahne was the leader, but was passed by Earnhardt Jr. one lap later. On the final lap, Earnhardt Jr. was able to drive to the fourth turn before running out of fuel. Harvick passed Earnhardt Jr. (who would drop to seventh) to win his third race of the season, ahead of Ragan and Logano.

=== Post-race ===
"Everybody sitting up here would say we want (Earnhardt's team) to win, and they're so close to winning and both times they had a chance. We are going to do what we have to do to win the races, and today it all just worked out strategy-wise that we won. But I feel so stinking bad for him, and I know how bad he wants it. But it'll happen. They keep running like that, it'll happen."

— Kevin Harvick, speaking after the race.

Harvick appeared in victory lane after his victory lap to start celebrating his third win of the season, in front of a crowd of 145,000 people. The race also became the longest in NASCAR history (at the time) after being extended by two laps. "Today we were lucky. We didn’t have a spectacular night, but to be in victory lane says a lot about this Budweiser team. I griped and griped and griped all day about how terrible it [the car] was," said Harvick of his triumph.

Although Earnhardt Jr. was leading the race on the final lap, Harvick passed him after he ran out of fuel in the final corner. Earnhardt Jr., who finished seventh, said, "We weren't supposed to make it. We run out of gas and kind of knew it. We played our hand. I tried to save a ton of gas. I know I didn't save enough but as much as I could." He continued, "I'm disappointed we didn't win. I know all our fans are disappointed to come so close. But if we'd have won that race, it'd have been a gift.

At Harvick's press conference after the race, Harvick gave a speech about how bad he felt for Earnhardt Jr. and Harvick's car owner, Richard Childress commented, "We all want to see Dale Junior win, but not at our expense. When I saw him come down the backstretch [on the last lap], I said, 'Dale is going to win this race.' Then I heard our spotter start screaming [about Junior running out of fuel]. I said, 'We’re going to win it – great.' " The race result moved Harvick into the second position in the Drivers' Championship standings with 409 points, 36 points behind Edwards and one ahead of Johnson in the third position. Earnhardt Jr. and Kyle Busch followed in fourth and fifth with 402 and 392 points. Chevrolet maintained their lead in the Manufacturers' Championship with 83 points. Ford and Toyota placed second and third with 77 and 64 points, while Dodge was fourth with 40. 10.1 million people watched the race on television. The race took four hours, thirty-three minutes and fourteen seconds to complete, and the margin of victory was 0.703 seconds.

== Results ==
=== Qualifying ===
No.	Driver	Team	Manufacturer	Time	Speed	Grid
2	Brad Keselowski	Penske Racing	Dodge	28.112	192.089	1
43	A. J. Allmendinger	Richard Petty Motorsports	Ford	28.170	191.693	2
99	Carl Edwards	Roush Fenway Racing	Ford	28.171	191.686	3
11	Denny Hamlin	Joe Gibbs Racing	Toyota	28.218	191.367	4
31	Jeff Burton	Richard Childress Racing	Chevrolet	28.236	191.245	5
48	Jimmie Johnson	Hendrick Motorsports	Chevrolet	28.262	191.069	6
00	David Reutimann	Michael Waltrip Racing	Toyota	28.284	190.921	7
6	David Ragan	Roush Fenway Racing	Ford	28.302	190.799	8
21	Ricky Stenhouse Jr.	Wood Brothers Racing	Ford	28.309	190.752	9
33	Clint Bowyer	Richard Childress Racing	Chevrolet	28.316	190.705	10
24	Jeff Gordon	Hendrick Motorsports	Chevrolet	28.331	190.604	11
39	Ryan Newman	Stewart–Haas Racing	Chevrolet	28.337	190.564	12
5	Mark Martin	Hendrick Motorsports	Chevrolet	28.360	190.409	13
56	Martin Truex Jr.	Michael Waltrip Racing	Toyota	28.391	190.201	14
16	Greg Biffle	Roush Fenway Racing	Ford	28.397	190.161	15
27	Paul Menard	Richard Childress Racing	Chevrolet	28.411	190.067	16
4	Kasey Kahne	Red Bull Racing Team	Toyota	28.437	189.893	17
83	Brian Vickers	Red Bull Racing Team	Toyota	28.441	189.867	18
17	Matt Kenseth	Roush Fenway Racing	Ford	28.442	189.860	19
78	Regan Smith	Furniture Row Racing	Chevrolet	28.456	189.767	20
18	Kyle Busch	Joe Gibbs Racing	Toyota	28.505	189.440	21
14	Tony Stewart	Stewart–Haas Racing	Chevrolet	28.509	189.414	22
20	Joey Logano	Joe Gibbs Racing	Toyota	28.523	189.321	23
9	Marcos Ambrose	Richard Petty Motorsports	Ford	28.528	189.288	24
88	Dale Earnhardt Jr.	Hendrick Motorsports	Chevrolet	28.581	188.937	25
22	Kurt Busch	Penske Racing	Dodge	28.595	188.844	26
47	Bobby Labonte	JTG Daugherty Racing	Toyota	28.624	188.653	27
29	Kevin Harvick	Richard Childress Racing	Chevrolet	28.660	188.416	28
42	Juan Pablo Montoya	Earnhardt Ganassi Racing	Chevrolet	28.699	188.160	29
34	David Gilliland	Front Row Motorsports	Ford	28.716	188.048	30
38	Travis Kvapil	Front Row Motorsports	Ford	28.725	187.990	31
95	David Starr	Leavine Fenton Racing	Ford	28.732	187.944	32
66	Michael McDowell	HP Racing	Toyota	28.772	187.682	33
46	J. J. Yeley	Whitney Motorsports	Chevrolet	28.798	187.513	34
1	Jamie McMurray	Earnhardt Ganassi Racing	Chevrolet	28.846	187.201	35
87	Joe Nemechek	NEMCO Motorsports	Toyota	28.851	187.169	36
13	Casey Mears	Germain Racing	Toyota	28.878	186.994	37
30	David Stremme	Inception Motorsports	Chevrolet	28.890	186.916	38
32	Mike Bliss	FAS Lane Racing	Ford	28.968	186.413	39
09	Landon Cassill	Phoenix Racing	Chevrolet	29.100	185.567	40
7	Robby Gordon	Robby Gordon Motorsports	Dodge	29.224	184.780	41
36	Dave Blaney	Tommy Baldwin Racing	Chevrolet	29.264	184.527	42
60	Mike Skinner	Germain Racing	Toyota	28.912	186.774	43
Failed to Qualify
71	Andy Lally	TRG Motorsports	Chevrolet	28.931	186.651	
50	T. J. Bell	LTD Powersports	Toyota	28.944	186.567	
77	Scott Wimmer	Robby Gordon Motorsports	Dodge	28.999	186.213	
37	Tony Raines	Front Row Motorsports	Ford	29.271	184.483	
81	Scott Riggs	Whitney Motorsports	Chevrolet	29.391	183.730	

=== Race results ===
Pos	Car	Driver	Team	Manufacturer	Laps Run	Points
1	29	Kevin Harvick	Richard Childress Racing	Chevrolet	402	47^{1}^{3}
2	6	David Ragan	Roush Fenway Racing	Ford	402	43^{1}
3	20	Joey Logano	Joe Gibbs Racing	Toyota	402	41
4	22	Kurt Busch	Penske Racing	Dodge	402	41^{1}
5	43	A. J. Allmendinger	Richard Petty Motorsports	Ford	402	40^{1}
6	9	Marcos Ambrose	Richard Petty Motorsports	Ford	402	39^{1}
7	88	Dale Earnhardt Jr.	Hendrick Motorsports	Chevrolet	402	38^{1}
8	78	Regan Smith	Furniture Row Racing	Chevrolet	402	36
9	00	David Reutimann	Michael Waltrip Racing	Toyota	402	35
10	11	Denny Hamlin	Joe Gibbs Racing	Toyota	402	35^{1}
11	21	Ricky Stenhouse Jr.	Wood Brothers Racing	Ford	402	0^{4}
12	42	Juan Pablo Montoya	Earnhardt Ganassi Racing	Chevrolet	402	33^{1}
13	16	Greg Biffle	Roush Fenway Racing	Ford	402	32^{1}
14	17	Matt Kenseth	Roush Fenway Racing	Ford	402	32^{2}
15	33	Clint Bowyer	Richard Childress Racing	Chevrolet	402	29
16	99	Carl Edwards	Roush Fenway Racing	Ford	402	29^{1}
17	14	Tony Stewart	Stewart–Haas Racing	Chevrolet	402	28^{1}
18	83	Brian Vickers	Red Bull Racing Team	Toyota	402	26
19	2	Brad Keselowski	Penske Racing	Dodge	402	26^{1}
20	24	Jeff Gordon	Hendrick Motorsports	Chevrolet	402	25^{1}
21	31	Jeff Burton	Richard Childress Racing	Chevrolet	402	24^{1}
22	4	Kasey Kahne	Red Bull Racing Team	Toyota	402	23^{1}
23	13	Casey Mears	Germain Racing	Toyota	402	22^{1}
24	47	Bobby Labonte	JTG Daugherty Racing	Toyota	400	20
25	38	Travis Kvapil	Front Row Motorsports	Ford	398	0^{4}
26	56	Martin Truex Jr.	Michael Waltrip Racing	Toyota	397	18
27	36	Dave Blaney	Tommy Baldwin Racing	Chevrolet	396	17
28	48	Jimmie Johnson	Hendrick Motorsports	Chevrolet	395	16
29	27	Paul Menard	Richard Childress Racing	Chevrolet	383	15
30	32	Mike Bliss	FAS Lane Racing	Ford	367	0^{4}
31	39	Ryan Newman	Stewart–Haas Racing	Chevrolet	358	13
32	18	Kyle Busch	Joe Gibbs Racing	Toyota	344	13^{1}
33	34	David Gilliland	Front Row Motorsports	Ford	301	11
34	5	Mark Martin	Hendrick Motorsports	Chevrolet	301	10
35	09	Landon Cassill	Phoenix Racing	Chevrolet	293	0^{4}
36	95	David Starr	Leavine Fenton Racing	Ford	286	0^{4}
37	1	Jamie McMurray	Earnhardt Ganassi Racing	Chevrolet	181	8
38	7	Robby Gordon	Robby Gordon Motorsports	Dodge	99	6
39	66	Michael McDowell	HP Racing	Toyota	40	5
40	30	David Stremme	Inception Motorsports	Chevrolet	34	4
41	87	Joe Nemechek	NEMCO Motorsports	Toyota	28	0^{4}
42	46	J. J. Yeley	Whitney Motorsports	Chevrolet	22	2
43	60	Mike Skinner	Germain Racing	Toyota	6	0^{4}
^{1} Includes one bonus point for leading a lap
^{2} Includes two bonus points for leading the most laps
^{3} Includes three bonus points for winning the race
^{4} Ineligible for championship points

== Standings after the race ==
Drivers' Championship standings

Pos	Driver	Points
1	Carl Edwards	445
2	Kevin Harvick	409
3	Jimmie Johnson	408
4	Dale Earnhardt Jr.	402
5	Kyle Busch	392

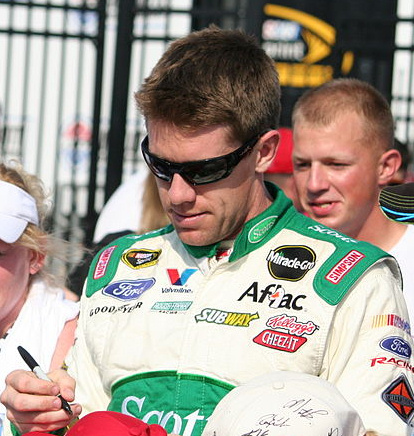
Carl Edwards led the Drivers' Championship standings after the race with 445 points

Manufacturers' Championship standings

Pos	Manufacturer	Points
1	Chevrolet	83
2	Ford	77
3	Toyota	64
4	Dodge	40

- Note: Only the top five positions are included for the driver standings.

Previous race: 2011 FedEx 400	Sprint Cup Series; 2011 season	Next race: 2011 STP 400
