= Historic Sportscar Racing =

American historic motorsport organization

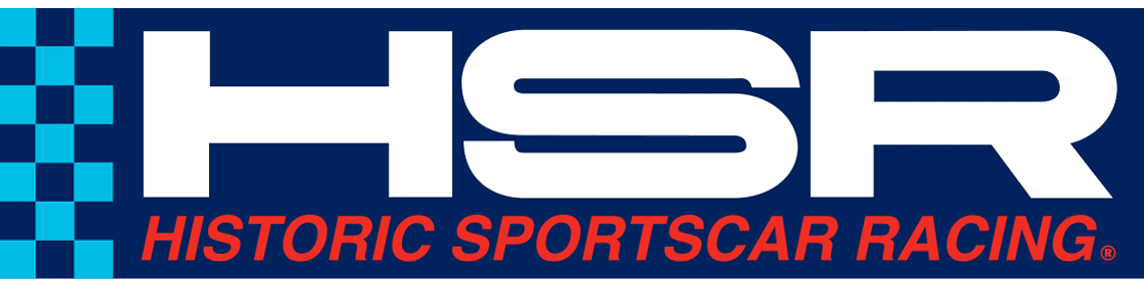

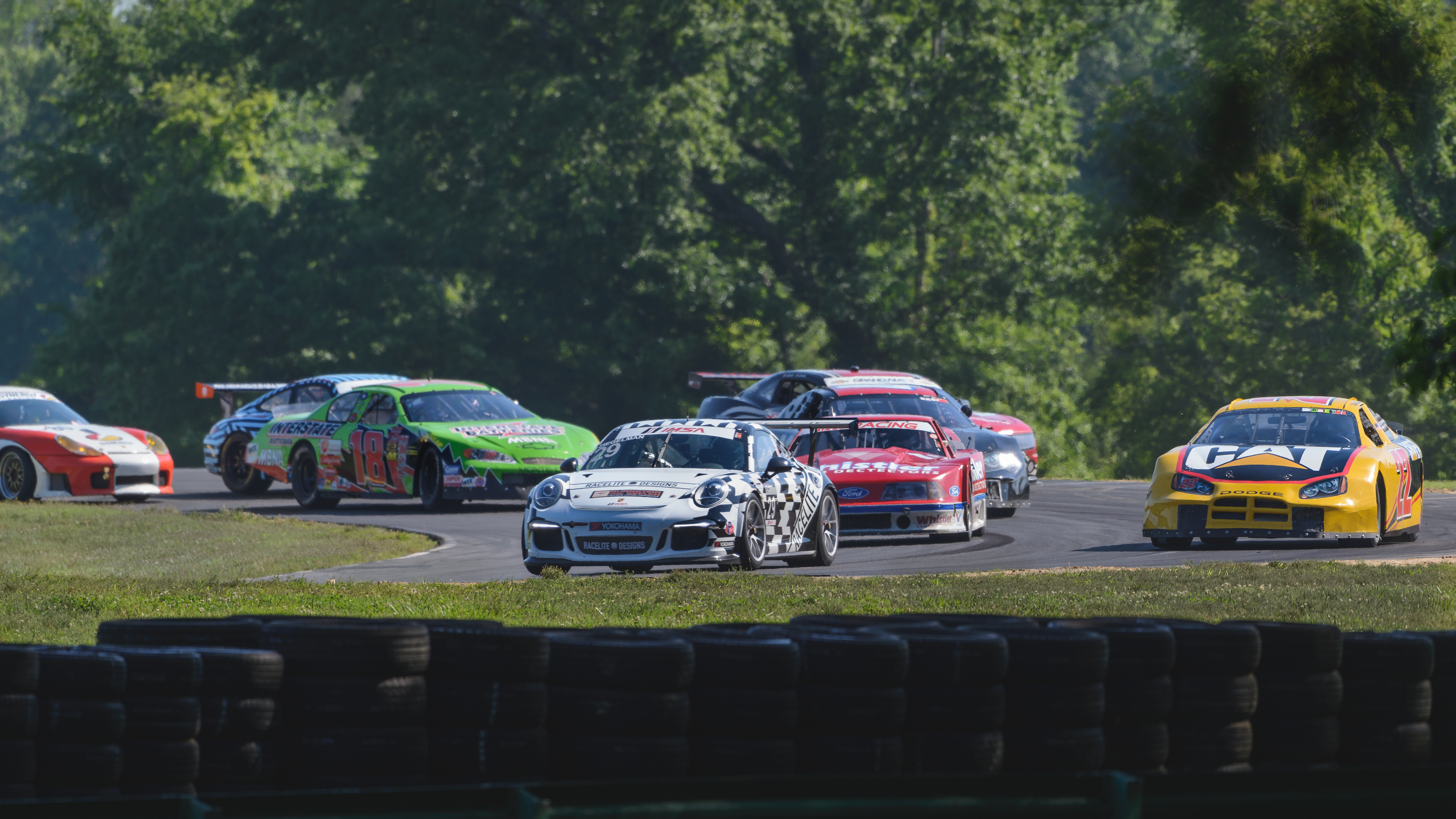
- Headquarters: Clearwater, Florida
- Location: U.S.
- Website: http://hsrrace.com/

Historic Sportscar Racing (HSR) is an automobile club and sanctioning body that supports historic racing in the United States. The organization traces its roots to the first running of the Walter Mitty Challenge in 1977 at Road Atlanta. HSR continues to sanction the Mitty, along with six to 10 other events each year. The organization has been owned by the NASCAR Holdings, through their International Motor Sports Association (IMSA) subsidiary since January 2022.

== Events and venues ==
The organization sanctions races on the East Coast and Canada. Annual events include:

- Rolex Monterey Motorsports Reunion at WeatherTech Raceway Laguna Seca
- Classic 24 Hours of Daytona presented by IMSA at Daytona International Speedway
- Classic 12 Hours of Sebring at Sebring International Raceway
- Classic 6 Hours of Watkins Glen at Watkins Glen International
- The Mitty at Road Atlanta
- Atlanta Fall Historics at Road Atlanta
- HSR Historic Stock Car Invitational at Darlington Raceway
- HSR NASCAR Classic organized in partnership with the Historic Stock Car Racing Association
