= 2024 General Tire 100 at The Glen =

17th race of the 2024 ARCA Menards Series

Race details
- Race 17 of 20 of the 2024 ARCA Menards Series
- Date: September 13, 2024
- Official name: 4th Annual General Tire 100 at The Glen
- Location: Watkins Glen International in Watkins Glen, New York
- Course: Permanent racing facility
- Course length: 2.454 miles (3.949 km)
- Distance: 41 laps, 100 mi (161 km)
- Scheduled distance: 41 laps, 100 mi (161 km)

Pole position
Driver	Connor Zilisch	Pinnacle Racing Group
- Time: 1:13.778

Most laps led
Driver	Connor Zilisch	Pinnacle Racing Group
- Laps: 40

Winner
No. 28	Connor Zilisch	Pinnacle Racing Group

Television in the United States
- Network: FS1
- Announcers: Jamie Little, Phil Parsons, and Trevor Bayne

Radio in the United States
- Radio: MRN

The 2024 General Tire 100 at The Glen was the 17th stock car race of the 2024 ARCA Menards Series season, and the 4th iteration of the event. The race was held on Friday, September 13, 2024, at Watkins Glen International in Watkins Glen, New York, a 2.454 mile (3.949 km) permanent road course. The race took the scheduled 41 laps to complete. Connor Zilisch, driving for Pinnacle Racing Group, would pull off another dominating performance, winning the pole and leading a race-high 40 laps with a 12 second lead to earn his fifth career ARCA Menards Series win, and his fifth of the season. To fill out the podium, William Sawalich, driving for Joe Gibbs Racing, and Brandon Jones, driving for Cook Racing Technologies, would finish 2nd and 3rd, respectively.

== Report ==
=== Background ===
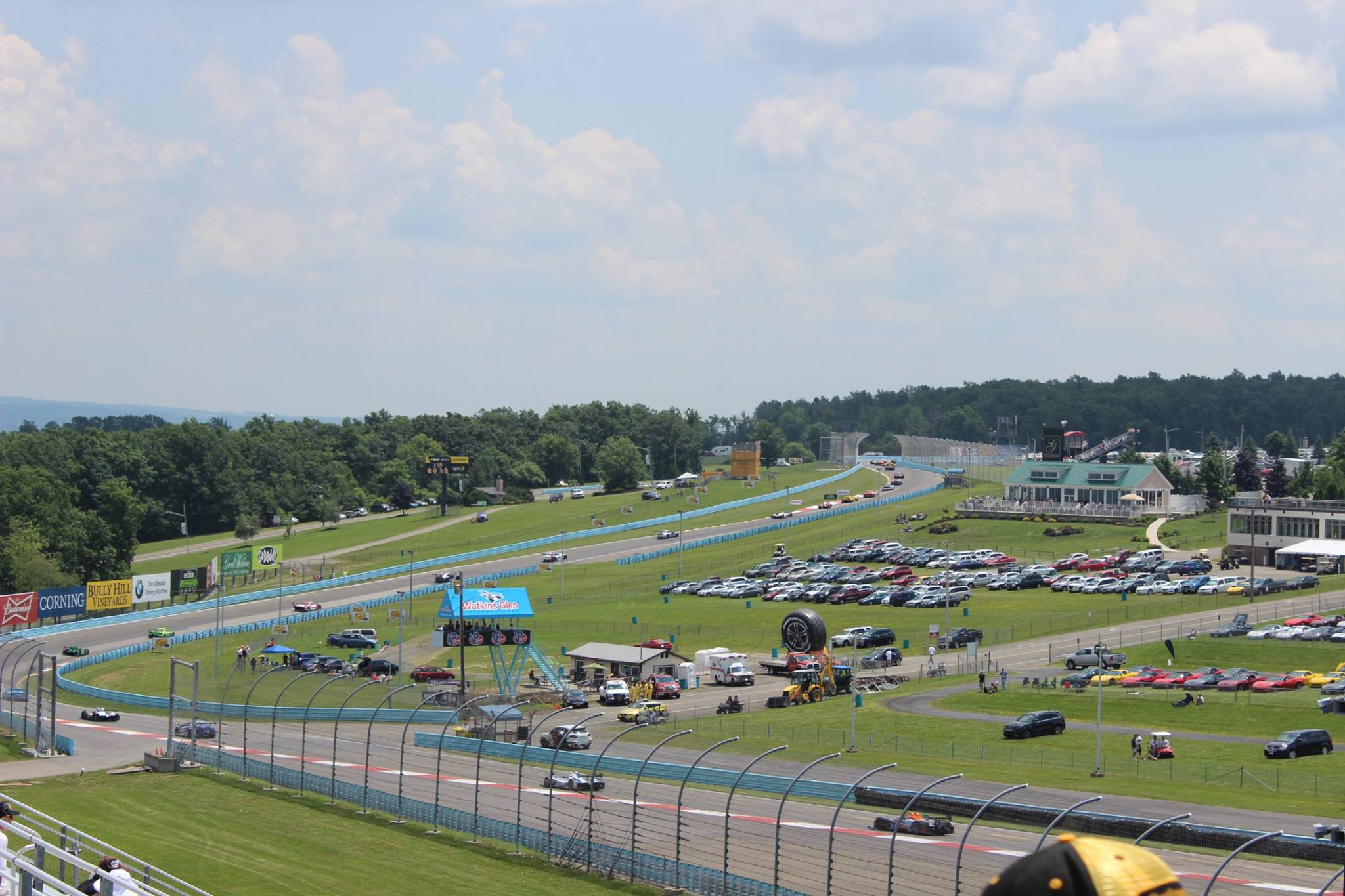
Watkins Glen International, the circuit where the race was held.

Watkins Glen International (nicknamed "The Glen") is an automobile race track located in Watkins Glen, New York at the southern tip of Seneca Lake. It was long known around the world as the home of the Formula One United States Grand Prix, which it hosted for twenty consecutive years (1961–1980), but the site has been home to road racing of nearly every class, including the World Sportscar Championship, Trans-Am, Can-Am, NASCAR Cup Series, the International Motor Sports Association and the IndyCar Series.

Initially, public roads in the village were used for the race course. In 1956 a permanent circuit for the race was built. In 1968 the race was extended to six hours, becoming the 6 Hours of Watkins Glen. The circuit's current layout has more or less been the same since 1971, although a chicane was installed at the uphill Esses in 1975 to slow cars through these corners, where there was a fatality during practice at the 1973 United States Grand Prix. The chicane was removed in 1985, but another chicane called the "Inner Loop" was installed in 1992 after J.D. McDuffie's fatal accident during the previous year's NASCAR Winston Cup event.

The circuit is known as the Mecca of North American road racing and is a very popular venue among fans and drivers. The facility is currently owned by International Speedway Corporation.

==== Entry list ====
- (R) denotes rookie driver.

#	Driver	Team	Make	Sponsor
2	Andrés Pérez de Lara	Rev Racing	Chevrolet	Max Siegel Inc.
03	Alex Clubb	Clubb Racing Inc.	Ford	Wallis Farms / Misfit Productions
3	Alex Quarterley	1/4 Ley Racing	Chevrolet	Van Dyk Recycling Solutions
4	Dale Quarterley	1/4 Ley Racing	Chevrolet	Van Dyk Recycling Solutions / ACI / Fire Rover
06	Nate Moeller	Wayne Peterson Racing	Toyota	Ocean Pipe Works
6	Lavar Scott (R)	Rev Racing	Chevrolet	Max Siegel Inc.
10	Ed Pompa	Fast Track Racing	Toyota	HYTORC of New York / Double "H" Ranch
11	Cody Dennison (R)	Fast Track Racing	Toyota	Timcast
12	Brayton Laster	Fast Track Racing	Ford	In Memory of Ron Hutcherson / Cammus
15	Kris Wright	Venturini Motorsports	Toyota	FNB Corporation
17	Marco Andretti	Cook Racing Technologies	Chevrolet	Group 1001
18	William Sawalich	Joe Gibbs Racing	Toyota	Starkey / SoundGear
20	Gio Ruggiero	Venturini Motorsports	Toyota	First Auto Group
22	Amber Balcaen	Venturini Motorsports	Toyota	ICON Direct
23	Connor Mosack	Sigma Performance Services	Chevrolet	F.W. Webb Company
25	Toni Breidinger	Venturini Motorsports	Toyota	Boozy Jerky
27	Tim Richmond	Richmond Motorsports	Toyota	Immigration Law Center
28	Connor Zilisch	Pinnacle Racing Group	Chevrolet	Chevrolet / Silver Hare Development
29	Ryan Gemmell	NEMCO Motorsports	Toyota	Diamond Brite / TC3 Turf
30	Dylan Lupton	Rette Jones Racing	Ford	Lupton Excavation
31	Rob Pellosie	Rise Motorsports	Chevrolet	Tooth Acres Dentistry
32	Christian Rose	AM Racing	Ford	West Virginia Department of Tourism
42	Brandon Jones	Cook Racing Technologies	Chevrolet	Lyons Bathtubs & Showers / Menards
44	Thomas Annunziata	Jeff McClure Racing	Ford	Bayshore Mortgage Funding
48	Brad Smith	Brad Smith Motorsports	Ford	Ski's Graphics
55	Jake Finch	Venturini Motorsports	Toyota	Phoenix Construction
71	Christopher Werth	CK Motorsports	Chevrolet	Kim's Quilting Corner / Otto Motorsports
73	Andy Jankowiak	KLAS Motorsports	Chevrolet	Whelen
99	Michael Maples (R)	Fast Track Racing	Chevrolet	Don Ray Petroleum LLC
Official entry list

== Practice ==
The first and only practice session was held on Friday, September 13, at 2:00 PM EST, and would last for 1 hour. Connor Zilisch, driving for Pinnacle Racing Group, would set the fastest time in the session, with a lap of 1:14.076, and a speed of 119.067 mph (191.620 km/h).

Pos.	#	Driver	Team	Make	Time	Speed
1	28	Connor Zilisch	Pinnacle Racing Group	Chevrolet	1:14.076	119.067
2	18	William Sawalich	Joe Gibbs Racing	Toyota	1:15.247	117.214
3	20	Gio Ruggiero	Venturini Motorsports	Toyota	1:15.260	117.194
Full practice results

== Qualifying ==
Qualifying was held on Friday, September 13, at 3:15 PM EST. The qualifying system used is a multi-car, multi-lap based system. All drivers will be on track for a 25-minute timed session, and whoever sets the fastest time in that session will win the pole.

Connor Zilisch, driving for Pinnacle Racing Group, would score the pole for the race, with a lap of 1:13.778, and a speed of 119.548 mph (192.394 km/h).

=== Qualifying results ===
Pos.	#	Driver	Team	Make	Time	Speed
1	28	Connor Zilisch	Pinnacle Racing Group	Chevrolet	1:13.778	119.548
2	18	William Sawalich	Joe Gibbs Racing	Toyota	1:14.458	118.456
3	44	Thomas Annunziata	Jeff McClure Racing	Ford	1:15.046	117.528
4	2	Andrés Pérez de Lara	Rev Racing	Chevrolet	1:15.211	117.270
5	20	Gio Ruggiero	Venturini Motorsports	Toyota	1:15.358	117.041
6	42	Brandon Jones	Cook Racing Technologies	Chevrolet	1:15.449	116.900
7	15	Kris Wright	Venturini Motorsports	Toyota	1:15.656	116.580
8	23	Connor Mosack	Sigma Performance Services	Chevrolet	1:15.832	116.310
9	6	Lavar Scott (R)	Rev Racing	Chevrolet	1:15.899	116.207
10	29	Ryan Gemmell	NEMCO Motorsports	Toyota	1:16.391	115.459
11	17	Marco Andretti	Cook Racing Technologies	Chevrolet	1:16.930	114.650
12	30	Dylan Lupton	Rette Jones Racing	Ford	1:16.974	114.584
13	4	Dale Quarterley	1/4 Ley Racing	Chevrolet	1:17.040	114.486
14	55	Jake Finch	Venturini Motorsports	Toyota	1:17.111	114.381
15	73	Andy Jankowiak	KLAS Motorsports	Chevrolet	1:17.221	114.218
16	25	Toni Breidinger	Venturini Motorsports	Toyota	1:17.464	113.859
17	3	Alex Quarterley	1/4 Ley Racing	Chevrolet	1:17.630	113.616
18	32	Christian Rose	AM Racing	Ford	1:18.310	112.629
19	71	Christopher Werth	CK Motorsports	Chevrolet	1:19.604	110.798
20	27	Tim Richmond	Richmond Motorsports	Toyota	1:19.633	110.758
21	11	Cody Dennison (R)	Fast Track Racing	Toyota	1:20.455	109.626
22	10	Ed Pompa	Fast Track Racing	Toyota	1:21.763	107.873
23	99	Michael Maples (R)	Fast Track Racing	Chevrolet	1:27.093	101.271
24	12	Brayton Laster	Fast Track Racing	Ford	1:30.015	97.984
25	06	Nate Moeller	Wayne Peterson Racing	Toyota	1:37.869	90.120
26	03	Alex Clubb	Clubb Racing Inc.	Ford	1:39.598	88.556
27	48	Brad Smith	Brad Smith Motorsports	Ford	1:43.700	85.053
28	22	Amber Balcaen	Venturini Motorsports	Toyota	6:03.497	24.264
29	31	Rob Pellosie	Rise Motorsports	Chevrolet	–	–
Official qualifying results

== Race results ==
Fin	St	#	Driver	Team	Make	Laps	Led	Status	Pts
1	1	28	Connor Zilisch	Pinnacle Racing Group	Chevrolet	41	40	Running	49
2	2	18	William Sawalich	Joe Gibbs Racing	Toyota	41	1	Running	43
3	6	42	Brandon Jones	Cook Racing Technologies	Chevrolet	41	0	Running	41
4	4	2	Andrés Pérez de Lara	Rev Racing	Chevrolet	41	0	Running	40
5	8	23	Connor Mosack	Sigma Performance Services	Chevrolet	41	0	Running	39
6	5	20	Gio Ruggiero	Venturini Motorsports	Toyota	41	0	Running	38
7	3	44	Thomas Annunziata	Jeff McClure Racing	Ford	41	0	Running	37
8	10	29	Ryan Gemmell	NEMCO Motorsports	Toyota	41	0	Running	36
9	9	6	Lavar Scott (R)	Rev Racing	Chevrolet	41	0	Running	35
10	12	30	Dylan Lupton	Rette Jones Racing	Ford	41	0	Running	34
11	13	4	Dale Quarterley	1/4 Ley Racing	Chevrolet	41	0	Running	33
12	7	15	Kris Wright	Venturini Motorsports	Toyota	41	0	Running	32
13	15	73	Andy Jankowiak	KLAS Motorsports	Chevrolet	41	0	Running	31
14	11	17	Marco Andretti	Cook Racing Technologies	Chevrolet	41	0	Running	30
15	14	55	Jake Finch	Venturini Motorsports	Toyota	41	0	Running	29
16	18	32	Christian Rose	AM Racing	Ford	40	0	Running	28
17	16	25	Toni Breidinger (Note: During the halfway break on lap 21, Breidinger stepped out of the No. 25 car and forfeit due to an injury that occurred to her in the previous race. Her crew chief, Cayden Lapcevich, would pilot the No. 25 car for the remainder of the race. Since Breidinger started the race, she is officially credited with the 17th-place finish.)	Venturini Motorsports	Toyota	40	0	Running	27
18	17	3	Alex Quarterley	1/4 Ley Racing	Chevrolet	39	0	Running	26
19	19	71	Christopher Werth	CK Motorsports	Chevrolet	39	0	Running	25
20	23	99	Michael Maples (R)	Fast Track Racing	Chevrolet	35	0	Running	24
21	26	03	Alex Clubb	Clubb Racing Inc.	Ford	32	0	Running	23
22	22	10	Ed Pompa	Fast Track Racing	Toyota	24	0	Running	22
23	25	06	Nate Moeller	Wayne Peterson Racing	Toyota	15	0	DNF	21
24	21	11	Cody Dennison (R)	Fast Track Racing	Toyota	12	0	DNF	20
25	29	31	Rob Pellosie	Rise Motorsports	Chevrolet	9	0	DNF	19
26	20	27	Tim Richmond	Richmond Motorsports	Toyota	8	0	DNF	18
27	24	12	Brayton Laster	Fast Track Racing	Ford	8	0	DNF	17
28	27	48	Brad Smith	Brad Smith Motorsports	Ford	0	0	DNF	16
29	28	22	Amber Balcaen	Venturini Motorsports	Toyota	0	0	DNF	15
Official race results

== Standings after the race ==
Drivers' Championship standings

	Pos	Driver	Points
	1	Andrés Pérez de Lara	804
	2	Lavar Scott	751 (-53)
	3	Kris Wright	729 (–75)
	4	Christian Rose	692 (–112)
	5	Toni Breidinger	686 (–118)
	6	Amber Balcaen	647 (–157)
1	7	Michael Maples	606 (–198)
1	8	Cody Dennison	605 (–199)
	9	Alex Clubb	585 (–219)
1	10	William Sawalich	543 (–261)

- Note: Only the first 10 positions are included for the driver standings.

Previous race: 2024 Southern Illinois 100	ARCA Menards Series; 2024 season	Next race: 2024 Bush's Beans 200
