= Music Within =

- Theatrical release poster
- Directed by: Steven Sawalich
- Written by: Bret McKinney; Mark Andrew Olsen; Kelly Kennemer
- Produced by: Brett Donowho; Bruce Wayne Gillies; Oli Laperal Jr. Steven Sawalich
- Starring: Ron Livingston; Melissa George; Michael Sheen; Yul Vazquez; Rebecca De Mornay; Hector Elizondo
- Cinematography: Irek Hartowicz
- Edited by: Timothy Alverson
- Music by: James T. Sale
- Production companies: Metro-Goldwyn-Mayer Pictures; Articulus Entertainment; Quorum Entertainment
- Distributed by: MGM Distribution Co.
- Release date: October 26, 2007
- Running time: 93 minutes
- Country: United States
- Language: English
- Box office: $153,205

Music Within is a 2007 American biographical period drama film directed by Steven Sawalich and starring Ron Livingston, Melissa George, Michael Sheen, Rebecca De Mornay, Marion Ross, Yul Vazquez, Leslie Nielsen, and Héctor Elizondo. It follows the life of Richard Pimentel (Livingston), a respected public speaker whose hearing disability attained in the Vietnam War drove him to become an activist for the Americans with Disabilities Act. Sheen portrays Arthur Honeyman, while George portrays Pimentel's girlfriend.

Filmed on location in Portland, Oregon, in 2006, Music Within screened at the AFI Dallas International Film Festival in February 2007, where it won the award for Best Narrative Feature Film. The film was acquired for distribution by Metro-Goldwyn-Mayer Pictures, who gave it a limited theatrical release in the United States on October 26, 2007.

== Plot ==
In 1947, in Portland, Oregon, infant Richard Pimentel was given up for adoption by his paranoid schizophrenic mother. She later reclaims her son from an orphanage, but his childhood with her as a single mother is turbulent, and he is largely cared for by his maternal grandmother and Chinese-American father, Dell Fong. When Dell dies in an accident at the market he owns, Richard is left in the sole care of his mother, who is institutionalized shortly after.

As an adolescent, Richard realizes that he has a gift for public speaking. Upon graduating high school in 1969, he visited Portland State University as a prospective student. Richard catches the attention of Dr. Ben Padrow, a football coach and head of the university's speech department, and recites a speech for him. Padrow harshly tells Richard that he needs to "live a full life" to gain perspective and hone his natural speaking skills. This inspired Richard to join the military, and he served as a soldier on the battlefield in the Vietnam War. A close-proximity bombing causes Richard to lose the majority of his hearing, and he is left with permanent tinnitus.

Richard returns to Portland, where he enrolls at the university. There, he befriends Mike Stolz, a mercurial alcoholic, and Art Honeyman, a high-IQ writer living with cerebral palsy. Richard and Art become close friends quickly. At a roller skating rink, Richard gets into a confrontation with Nikos, the boyfriend of a fellow university student, Christine, when Richard—using his ability to read lips—observes him insulting Art from a distance. Later, Richard sees Christine on the university campus, and responds to her rideshare advertisement for a trip to Seattle to attend a Jefferson Airplane concert. Richard spends the night at Christine's house and the two have sex. He is shocked upon finding that Christine is an open relationship with Nikos, but agrees to continue dating her.

Upon graduating university, Richard begins a successful career working for an insurance agency. On Art's birthday, Richard takes him out to dinner, but the two are refused service by a waitress and manager, for fear that Art is disturbing other customers. When they protest, Richard and Art are arrested and booked on the grounds of violating an "ugly law," an ordinance targeting the poor and disabled from appearing in public spaces. The incident inspires Richard to quit his insurance job and dedicate his time to nonprofit work helping placing veterans and other people with disabilities in jobs.

In 1978, Richard is fitted with hearing aids for the first time, though they do not provide adequate hearing ability. With Dr. Padrow's help, Richard is introduced to Bill Austin, the founder of Starkey Hearing Technologies, who produce state-of-the-art hearing aids. Meanwhile, Richard, collaborating with Art, begins writing a treatise on the subject of disabled persons. Through the 1980s, Richard's career takes off as he becomes a keynote speaker for the U.S. Government, giving speeches to government agencies and sectors on training and protocols for people with disabilities; he also devises a training program to help educate the public on HIV/AIDS. However, Richard's high-profile career begins to negatively impact his relationship with Christine. When Richard cancels plans with Christine to attend a speaking engagement, Christine decides to end their relationship. Richard is further devastated when Mike commits suicide, and his mother dies in a psychiatric hospital.

Richard reconnects with Christine, now engaged to another man, and the two maintain an amicable friendship. In 1990, the Americans with Disabilities Act is signed into congress, and Richard's efforts are recognized. Shortly after, Richard and Art celebrate Art's birthday at the diner where they were once refused service.

== Cast ==
- Ron Livingston as Richard Pimentel
  - Ridge Canipe as Young Richard Pimentel
- Melissa George as Christine
- Michael Sheen as Art Honeyman
- Yul Vazquez as Mike Stolz
- Rebecca De Mornay as Mrs. Pimentel
- Clint Jung as Dell Fong
- Marion Ross as Richard's Grandmother
- Hector Elizondo as Dr. Ben Padrow
- Leslie Nielsen as Bill Austin
- Paul Michael as Joe
- John Livingston as Mr. Parks
- Brett Donowho as McMahon
- Clint Howard as Clerk
- Linda Burden-Williams as Bambi

== Production ==
=== Casting ===
For preparation of his portrayal of Richard Pimentel, Ron Livingston attended a speaking event Pimentel appeared at in Minnesota, and subsequently spent time with Pimentel in order to accurately portray his mannerisms.

Actress Melissa George was compelled to act in the film because her father, an Australian, had fought in the Vietnam War, and sustained lifelong tinnitus and partial hearing loss as a result. Director Steven Sawalich's stepfather William F. Austin, the founder of Starkey Hearing Technologies, arranged for George's father to travel from western Australia to the United States and had him fitted with the company's hearing aids.

=== Filming ===
Principal photography of Music Within took place primarily in Portland, Oregon, including the Portland State University campus.

== Soundtrack ==
Though an official soundtrack was not released, the film features the following songs: (Note: The soundtrack listing has been adapted from the film's end credits, and the songs are listed in the order they are featured in the film.)

- "You're Nobody 'Til Someone Loves You" by Dean Martin
- "Green Green Tomatoes" by Marc Dold and Judith Martin
- "Intergalactic Cowboy" by Crit Harmon
- "Midnight Rambler" by The Rolling Stones
- "We Gotta Get Out of this Place" by The Animals
- "Papa's Got a Brand New Bag" by James Brown
- "But It's Alright" by J. J. Jackson
- "Papa Was, Too" by Joe Tex
- "Hush" by Deep Purple
- "It's Your Thing" by The Isley Brothers
- "Sunshine Superman" by Donovan
- "Magic Carpet Ride" by Steppenwolf
- "Somebody to Love" by Jefferson Airplane
- "Rebellious Youth, No Regrets" by Simon Heselev
- "Mas que Nada" by Sérgio Mendes & Brasil '66
- "Stuck in the Middle with You" by Stealers Wheel
- "In Your Eyes" by Jon Aldrich
- "Let It Out (Let It All Hang Out)" by The Hombres
- "N.I.B." by Black Sabbath
- "Brazilian Sunset" by Brad Hatfield
- "Get Together" by The Youngbloods
- "As Long as You Don't Want It" by John Powers
- "Tin Man" by America
- "Shambala" by Three Dog Night
- "Mona Lisas and Mad Hatters" by Elton John
- "China Grove" by The Doobie Brothers

== Release ==
Music Within was selected for the opening night gala of the American Film Institute's Dallas International Film Festival in February 2007.

=== Box office ===
The film was given a limited theatrical release in the United States by Metro-Goldwyn-Mayer on October 26, 2007. In its opening weekend, the film grossed $52,744 in 17 theaters. It went on to earn a total of $154,087 in the United States, and another $33,494 internationally, for a worldwide gross of $187,581.

Writing on the difficulty of marketing the film, journalist Kirk Honeycutt noted: "the challenge faced by MGM is to persuade an audience to risk seeing a movie about events leading up to the landmark Americans With Disabilities Act. The film opens today in 10 markets and will need strong critical support in tandem with MGM’s marketing to create awareness. The film will more than likely make its mark in cable and DVD markets."

=== Critical response ===
On the review aggregator website Rotten Tomatoes, 33% of 42 critics' reviews are positive. The website's consensus reads: "Music Within is a well-intentioned but pedestrian production of a story that deserves better treatment." Metacritic, which uses a weighted average, assigned the film a score of 53 out of 100, based on 18 critics, indicating "mixed or average" reviews.

Kirk Honeycutt of The Hollywood Reporter noted: "Music Within will hook the audience up with a supremely cool and witty real-life character, Richard Pimentel...what should be a tough, sentimental slog whisks by in a breezy, entertaining 94 minutes like a kind of illustrated stand-up comedy routine." Matt Seitz of The New York Times, however, called the film's direction "annoyingly unimaginative," ultimately deeming it "a bad movie with a good heart." Reviewing the film for Slant Magazine, Nick Schager awarded it two out of four stars, noting: "Livingston, a consistently appealing presence who exudes unpretentious everyman charm, successfully sells even the corniest of scenarios—the most groan-worthy of which is a discriminatory pancake house offense that, per uplifting melodramatic requirements—is rectified 20 years later with some heartwarming syrup." Wesley Morris of The Boston Globe echoed a similar sentiment, writing that the film is "everything it ought to be: right-minded, well-intentioned, compassionate. But it doesn't rise above made-for-cable public service announcement, either."

Kevin Crust of the Los Angeles Times praised the film's performances, but felt that the film lost narrative momentum in its second half, "when Pimentel’s dedication to his work... takes a toll on his relationship with Christine. So much time is spent on obligatory scenes involving answering machines and chance encounters on the street that his work on the ADA seems to get short shrift." Time Out awarded the film three out of five stars, but similarly criticized the film's structure, describing it as a "connect-the-dots biopic" that renders Pimentel's personal story "almost superfluous compared with the more compelling story of how he changed a crippled culture of “ugly” laws (wherein the police had a right to arrest anyone who was physically “unsightly”) to one with required wheelchair accessibility."

Roger Ebert called the film "entertaining" and "sometimes inspiring," but added: "What bothers me is that Music Within takes an individual story, an inspiring one, yes, and then thinks that's all there is to be told. It wasn't one guy who got mad. It was decades of struggle, decades of rejection, decades of streets that couldn't be crossed, stairs that couldn't be climbed, houses that couldn't be lived in and customers who couldn't be bothered."

=== Accolades ===
Institution	Category	Recipient	Result	Ref.
AFI Dallas International Film Festival	Best Narrative Feature Film	Music Within	Won	
St. Louis Film Critics Association	Best Supporting Actor	Michael Sheen	Nominated	

=== Home media ===
Music Within was released on DVD in North America on April 8, 2008, by MGM Home Entertainment. A Blu-ray was released in Germany in 2013 by Universum Film GmbH.

== See also ==
- List of films featuring the deaf and hard of hearing
