= Tilting at windmills (disambiguation) =

Tilting at windmills is an English idiom which means "attacking imaginary enemies", originating from Miguel de Cervantes' novel Don Quixote.

Tilting at Windmills may also refer to:

- The Eternal Quest (2003), also known as Tilting at Windmills, a novel by Julian Branston
- Tilting at Windmills: How I Tried to Stop Worrying and Love Sport, a 2002 book by Andy Miller
- Tilting at Windmills (2005), an album by Dive Dive
- "Tilting at Windmills", a song by Weddings, Parties, Anything from the album Roaring Days (1988)
- "Tilting at Windmills", a song by The Field Mice from the album For Keeps (1991)
- Tilting at Windmills, a training program developed by Richard Pimentel to teach government agencies how to integrate people with disabilities

== See also ==
- "Tilting Against Windmills", a song by Protest the Hero from the album Volition (2013)
- Windmill Tilter: The Story of Don Quixote, a 1969 jazz album by trumpeter Kenny Wheeler
