= Arthur Honeyman =

American writer (1940–2008)

- Born: May 10, 1940; Sharon, Massachusetts, U.S.
- Died: December 8, 2008 (aged 68); Seattle, Washington, U.S.
- Occupation(s): Writer, activist

Arthur Honeyman (May 10, 1940 – December 8, 2008), also known as Art Honeyman, was an American poet, author, and disability rights activist. His book Sam and his Cart was adapted into a movie in 1981. Honeyman is one of the main characters in the 2007 film Music Within.

== Early life ==
Honeyman was born to Elizabeth and Charles Honeyman, and was raised with three siblings in Sharon, Massachusetts. Because he had cerebral palsy, Honeyman was not allowed to attend a public school. His parents however, kept requesting education for their son, and beginning in 1947 he was provided with a tutor for homeschooling. From 1952 until his high school graduation in 1959, Honeyman attended Massachusetts Hospital School, a school for disabled students.

His mother developed schizophrenia and was committed to a care facility. Honeyman's father moved with his children to Reno, Nevada, and then to Portland, Oregon.

== Career ==
Wheelchair user Honeyman worked in house-to-house selling from age 19, until the age of 23. The people he encountered behaved rudely, complained, or even called the police.

Honeyman had difficulties being accepted by a college as an undergraduate.

In the 1960s, Honeyman experienced communal living in an urban commune and was a co-owner of a communal farm in Oregon. He participated in anti-Vietnam War and civil rights activism. Honeyman also burned his draft card, and was arrested three times as protester against the Trojan Nuclear Power Plant in Rainier, Oregon. As a protest action against the lack of wheelchair access on busses, he pushed his wheelchair from Portland to Salem.

Honeyman achieved a Bachelor of Science degree in History in 1965, and a Master's degree in Literature from Portland State University in 1974.

At the university, Honeyman met disability rights advocate Richard Pimentel, who often describes a situation in a pancake house where Honeyman was denied services, as a key moment for his own activism. Honeyman's positive attitude inspired Pimentel. The Americans with Disabilities Act, or ADA, was signed by President George H.W. Bush on July 26, 1990. they would return together to the pancake house where they were rightfully served.

At the age of 20, Honeyman had begun writing. Beginning in 1974, he published multiple poems and essays. His first book was the children's story Sam and his Cart, published in 1977: Sam drives in a wheelchair-like cart and sells light bulbs from door to door for living. He is confronted with tragic reactions by others.

From 1975 to 1978, Art Honeyman worked as a teaching aide at Adams High School (Portland, Oregon), from 1979 as a research analyst for the Oregon Bureau of Labor and Industries, serving on the Commission for the Handicapped board in 1983 and 1984. He became director of Oregon's Handicap Research Project.

Art Honeyman campaigned for a school board seat in Portland, and twice on a "Spastic Power" platform for the Oregon Legislative Assembly.

A variety of publications followed until 2005. Honeyman also wrote manuscripts of his autobiography from about 2005 to 2008. They remain unfinished.

== Film adaptations ==
The movie Sam and his Cart, based on Honeyman's first book, was published in 1981. The film won an American Film Festival Award.

In 2007, Metro-Goldwyn-Mayer released the full-length motion picture Music Within of Richard Pimentel's life story including his friendship with Arthur Honeyman, starring Michael Sheen as Art.

== Death ==
Arthur Honeyman died on December 8, 2008, in Seattle, Washington, while visiting friends.

== Publications ==
Honeyman published the following:

Wheel Press publications (books), 1980–1987

- Sam and His Cart, 1977 – 1985 (3 editions)
- The Claws and the Horns, 1981
- Sam and His Bright Idea: A Christmas Sequel for Young People Everywhere, 1985 (2 editions)
- Epic: poetry, 1982
- Vernal Verse, 1987
- Brownie and His Friend, Sam: Another Dog and Boy Story, 1986
- Journey: essays, 1982
- Mr. Johnson Speaks Out On: The Follies of Sexism in the Civilized World, 1986
- Los manos del poet: poems = the hands of the poet, 1984
- Umbly Yours: random poems & cover design, 1992
- Coffee Me a Cup of Fix: Poems for Your Coffee Table

Writings, 1974–2005

- Poems and essays for a variety of different publications

Autobiography manuscripts, circa 2005–2008

- Art for Arts Sake: An Autobiography of a Spastic.
