= DMP =

DMP may refer to:

== In science and technology ==
- 2,2-Dimethoxypropane, a chemical reagent
- 2,6-dimethylphenol, a monomer
- Data management plan, generally submitted as part of research grant proposals
- Data management platform, software for managing online advertising and customer data as part of personalized marketing
- Data memory-dependent prefetcher, part of some CPU architectures
- Dess–Martin periodinane, a chemical reagent used to oxidise alcohols
- Dot matrix printer, a type of printers used very commonly in the late 20th century
- Digital media player, a category within the Digital Living Network Alliance (DLNA) standard
- Dimethyl phthalate, a plasticizer
- Dimethyl pimelimidate, also known as dimethyl pimelimidate dihydrochloride, a cross-linking reagent
- Disease management programmes for chronic diseases
- Dynamic multipathing, a system of computer storage
- Dynamics of Markovian particles, in statistical mechanics, the basis of a theory for kinetics of particles
- DMP, a file suffix in Microsoft Windows used to indicate a file containing core dump data
- Digital Media Professionals, a Japanese GPU design company who designed the PICA200 chip
- Differentially Methylated Position; a methylated probe in the Illumina Methylation Assay
- Dynamic Map Platform North America, Inc., a provider of high-definition mapping data for advanced driver assistance systems and autonomous driving technologies

== Medical ==
- Doctor of Medical Physics, a degree in medical physics
- Dance movement therapy (in the UK) or "dance therapy" (in the US and Australia)
- Differentially methylated positions, of differentially methylated regions, in genetics

== In entertainment ==
- Demotivational poster
- Digital Manga Publishing, a North American company that publishes manga
- Digital matte painter
- Digital matte painting, a form of matte painting
- DMP Digital Music Products, a jazz record label founded in 1983 by Tom Jung
- Donaldson, Moir and Paterson, a Scottish rock band
- Drayton Manor Theme Park, a theme park in Staffordshire, England

== Other uses ==
- The Daleks' Master Plan, 1965–1966 Doctor Who serial
- Debbie Mucarsel-Powell, American politician
- Debt management plan
- Desert Memorial Park, a cemetery near Palm Springs, California
- Dhaka Metropolitan Police
- Disability management program, used by employers to assist employees who are unable to work due to injury or illness
- Dublin Metropolitan Police, the police force of Dublin, Ireland, from 1836 to 1925
- Dual-member proportional representation, a proposed voting system developed in Canada
