= DMPS =

DMPS may be an acronym for:

- 2,3-Dimercapto-1-propanesulfonic acid (DMPS), a chelating agent
- Des Moines Public Schools, a school district based in Des Moines, Iowa

== See also ==
- DMP (disambiguation)
