= 2026 General Tire 100 at The Glen =

ARCA Menards Series race at Watkins Glen International

Race details
- Race 5 of 20 in the 2026 ARCA Menards Series
- Date: May 8, 2026
- Location: Watkins Glen International in Watkins Glen, New York
- Course: Permanent racing facility
- Course length: 2.454 miles (3.949 km)
- Distance: 41 laps, 100.4 mi (161.578 km)
- Average speed: 90.270 miles per hour (145.275 km/h)

Pole position
| Driver | Max Reaves | Joe Gibbs Racing |
- Grid positions set by competition-based formula

Most laps led
| Driver | Kaden Honeycutt | Cook Racing Technologies |
- Laps: 29

Fastest lap
| Driver | Carson Brown | Pinnacle Racing Group |
- Time: 1:13.929

Winner
| No. 17 | Kaden Honeycutt | Cook Racing Technologies |

Television in the United States
- Network: FS2
- Announcers: Brent Stover, Phil Parsons, and Austin Cindric

Radio in the United States
- Radio: MRN

The 2026 General Tire 100 at The Glen was an ARCA Menards Series race held on Friday, May 8, 2026, at Watkins Glen International in Watkins Glen, New York. Contested over 41 laps on the 2.45-mile (3.94 km) road course, it was the fifth race of the 2026 ARCA Menards Series season, and the 6th running of the event.

Kaden Honeycutt, driving for Cook Racing Technologies, navigated his way to the front of the field after starting 15th, passing Carson Brown for the lead on lap 12, and led the remainder of the race in dominating fashion to earn his first career ARCA Menards Series win. Brown finished second, and Thomas Annunziata finished third. Gavan Boschele and Sam Corry rounded out the top five, while Isabella Robusto, Andrew Ranger, Max Reaves, Ryan Gemmell, and Jake Bollman rounded out the top ten.

== Report ==
=== Background ===
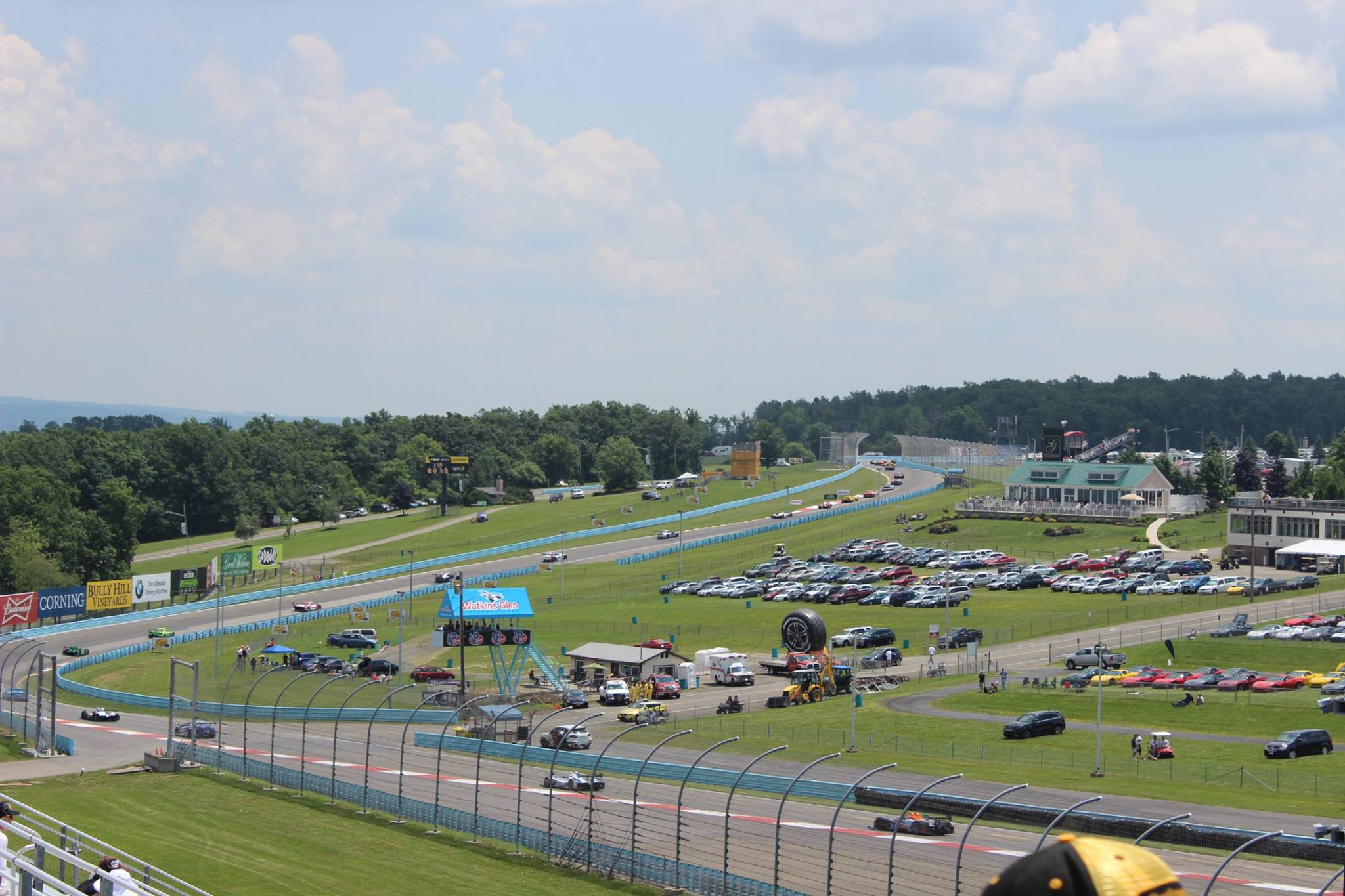
Watkins Glen International, the track where the race was held.

Watkins Glen International (nicknamed "The Glen") is an automobile race track located in Watkins Glen, New York at the southern tip of Seneca Lake. It was long known around the world as the home of the Formula One United States Grand Prix, which it hosted for twenty consecutive years (1961–1980), but the site has been home to road racing of nearly every class, including the World Sportscar Championship, Trans-Am, Can-Am, NASCAR Cup Series, the International Motor Sports Association and the IndyCar Series.

Initially, public roads in the village were used for the race course. In 1956 a permanent circuit for the race was built. In 1968 the race was extended to six hours, becoming the 6 Hours of Watkins Glen. The circuit's current layout has more or less been the same since 1971, although a chicane was installed at the uphill Esses in 1975 to slow cars through these corners, where there was a fatality during practice at the 1973 United States Grand Prix. The chicane was removed in 1985, but another chicane called the "Inner Loop" was installed in 1992 after J.D. McDuffie's fatal accident during the previous year's NASCAR Winston Cup event.

==== Entry list ====
- (R) denotes rookie driver.

| # | Driver | Team | Make |
|---|---|---|---|
| 01 | Craig Pellegrini Jr. | Fast Track Racing | Toyota |
| 1 | Andrew Rocque | Maples Motorsports | Chevrolet |
| 2 | Kyle Steckly | RAFA Racing Team | Toyota |
| 03 | Alex Clubb | Clubb Racing Inc. | Ford |
| 06 | Nate Moeller | Wayne Peterson Motorsports | Toyota |
| 10 | Ed Pompa | Fast Track Racing | Toyota |
| 11 | Trent Curtis | Fast Track Racing | Chevrolet |
| 12 | Takuma Koga | Fast Track Racing | Toyota |
| 15 | Sam Corry | Nitro Motorsports | Toyota |
| 17 | Kaden Honeycutt | Cook Racing Technologies | Toyota |
| 18 | Max Reaves (R) | Joe Gibbs Racing | Toyota |
| 19 | Corey Aiken | Maples Motorsports | Ford |
| 20 | Jake Bollman (R) | Nitro Motorsports | Toyota |
| 25 | Gavan Boschele (R) | Nitro Motorsports | Toyota |
| 28 | Carson Brown (R) | Pinnacle Racing Group | Chevrolet |
| 29 | Ryan Gemmell | NEMCO Motorsports | Toyota |
| 34 | Ryan Vargas | Maples Motorsports | Chevrolet |
| 44 | Jeff Anton | 1/4 Ley Racing | Chevrolet |
| 48 | Brad Smith | Brad Smith Motorsports | Ford |
| 51 | Patrick Staropoli | Rick Ware Racing | Chevrolet |
| 53 | Andrew Ranger | NDS Motorsports | Chevrolet |
| 55 | Isabella Robusto | Nitro Motorsports | Toyota |
| 66 | Dystany Spurlock | MBM Motorsports | Ford |
| 70 | Thomas Annunziata | Nitro Motorsports | Toyota |
| 71 | Andy Jankowiak | KLAS Motorsports | Chevrolet |
| 72 | Christopher Werth | CK Motorsports | Chevrolet |
| 77 | Tristan McKee | Pinnacle Racing Group | Chevrolet |
| 79 | Isaac Kitzmiller | ACR Motorsports | Chevrolet |
| 86 | Jeff Maconi (R) | Clubb Racing Inc. | Ford |
| 89 | Bobby Dale Earnhardt | Rise Racing | Chevrolet |
| 91 | Tyler Kicera | Maples Motorsports | Ford |
| 97 | Jason Kitzmiller | CR7 Motorsports | Chevrolet |
| 99 | Michael Maples | Maples Motorsports | Chevrolet |
Official entry list

== Practice ==
The first and only practice session was held on Friday, May 8, at 10:00 AM EST, and lasted for 1 hour.

Kaden Honeycutt, driving for Cook Racing Technologies, set the fastest time in the session, with a lap of 1:22.600 seconds, and a speed of 106.780 miles per hour (171.846 km/h).

=== Practice results ===
| Pos. | # | Driver | Team | Make | Time | Speed |
|---|---|---|---|---|---|---|
| 1 | 17 | Kaden Honeycutt | Cook Racing Technologies | Toyota | 1:22.600 | 106.780 |
| 2 | 70 | Thomas Annunziata | Nitro Motorsports | Toyota | 1:23.422 | 105.728 |
| 3 | 91 | Tyler Kicera | Maples Motorsports | Ford | 1:24.870 | 103.924 |
Full practice results

== Starting lineup ==
Qualifying was originally scheduled to be held on Friday, May 8, at 10:30 AM EST, but was cancelled due to inclement weather. The starting lineup was determined by 2026 owners' points. As a result, Max Reaves, driving for Joe Gibbs Racing, was awarded the pole.

=== Starting lineup ===
| Pos. | # | Driver | Team | Make |
|---|---|---|---|---|
| 1 | 18 | Max Reaves (R) | Joe Gibbs Racing | Toyota |
| 2 | 28 | Carson Brown (R) | Pinnacle Racing Group | Chevrolet |
| 3 | 20 | Jake Bollman (R) | Nitro Motorsports | Toyota |
| 4 | 77 | Tristan McKee | Pinnacle Racing Group | Chevrolet |
| 5 | 91 | Tyler Kicera | Maples Motorsports | Ford |
| 6 | 71 | Andy Jankowiak | KLAS Motorsports | Chevrolet |
| 7 | 97 | Jason Kitzmiller | CR7 Motorsports | Chevrolet |
| 8 | 25 | Gavan Boschele (R) | Nitro Motorsports | Toyota |
| 9 | 70 | Thomas Annunziata | Nitro Motorsports | Toyota |
| 10 | 15 | Sam Corry | Nitro Motorsports | Toyota |
| 11 | 12 | Takuma Koga | Fast Track Racing | Toyota |
| 12 | 99 | Michael Maples | Maples Motorsports | Chevrolet |
| 13 | 55 | Isabella Robusto | Nitro Motorsports | Toyota |
| 14 | 89 | Bobby Dale Earnhardt | Rise Racing | Chevrolet |
| 15 | 17 | Kaden Honeycutt | Cook Racing Technologies | Toyota |
| 16 | 11 | Trent Curtis | Fast Track Racing | Chevrolet |
| 17 | 10 | Ed Pompa | Fast Track Racing | Toyota |
| 18 | 01 | Craig Pellegrini Jr. | Fast Track Racing | Toyota |
| 19 | 03 | Alex Clubb | Clubb Racing Inc. | Ford |
| 20 | 66 | Dystany Spurlock | MBM Motorsports | Ford |
| 21 | 06 | Nate Moeller | Wayne Peterson Motorsports | Toyota |
| 22 | 48 | Brad Smith | Brad Smith Motorsports | Ford |
| 23 | 19 | Corey Aiken | Maples Motorsports | Ford |
| 24 | 86 | Jeff Maconi (R) | Clubb Racing Inc. | Ford |
| 25 | 34 | Ryan Vargas | Maples Motorsports | Chevrolet |
| 26 | 1 | Andrew Rocque | Maples Motorsports | Chevrolet |
| 27 | 79 | Isaac Kitzmiller | ACR Motorsports | Chevrolet |
| 28 | 51 | Patrick Staropoli | Rick Ware Racing | Chevrolet |
| 29 | 44 | Jeff Anton | 1/4 Ley Racing | Chevrolet |
| 30 | 2 | Kyle Steckly | RAFA Racing Team | Toyota |
| 31 | 29 | Ryan Gemmell | NEMCO Motorsports | Toyota |
| 32 | 53 | Andrew Ranger | NDS Motorsports | Chevrolet |
| 33 | 72 | Christopher Werth | CK Motorsports | Chevrolet |
Official starting lineup

== Race ==
=== Race results ===
Laps: 41

| Fin | St | # | Driver | Team | Make | Laps | Led | Status | Pts |
|---|---|---|---|---|---|---|---|---|---|
| 1 | 15 | 17 | Kaden Honeycutt | Cook Racing Technologies | Toyota | 41 | 29 | Running | 48 |
| 2 | 2 | 28 | Carson Brown (R) | Pinnacle Racing Group | Chevrolet | 41 | 12 | Running | 43 |
| 3 | 9 | 70 | Thomas Annunziata | Nitro Motorsports | Toyota | 41 | 0 | Running | 91 |
| 4 | 8 | 25 | Gavan Boschele (R) | Nitro Motorsports | Toyota | 41 | 0 | Running | 40 |
| 5 | 10 | 15 | Sam Corry | Nitro Motorsports | Toyota | 41 | 0 | Running | 39 |
| 6 | 13 | 55 | Isabella Robusto | Nitro Motorsports | Toyota | 41 | 0 | Running | 88 |
| 7 | 32 | 53 | Andrew Ranger | NDS Motorsports | Chevrolet | 41 | 0 | Running | 37 |
| 8 | 1 | 18 | Max Reaves (R) | Joe Gibbs Racing | Toyota | 41 | 0 | Running | 36 |
| 9 | 31 | 29 | Ryan Gemmell | NEMCO Motorsports | Toyota | 41 | 0 | Running | 35 |
| 10 | 3 | 20 | Jake Bollman (R) | Nitro Motorsports | Toyota | 41 | 0 | Running | 84 |
| 11 | 29 | 44 | Jeff Anton | 1/4 Ley Racing | Chevrolet | 41 | 0 | Running | 33 |
| 12 | 5 | 91 | Tyler Kicera | Maples Motorsports | Ford | 41 | 0 | Running | 32 |
| 13 | 6 | 71 | Andy Jankowiak | KLAS Motorsports | Chevrolet | 41 | 0 | Running | 81 |
| 14 | 25 | 34 | Ryan Vargas | Maples Motorsports | Chevrolet | 40 | 0 | Running | 80 |
| 15 | 30 | 2 | Kyle Steckly | RAFA Racing Team | Toyota | 40 | 0 | Running | 29 |
| 16 | 11 | 12 | Takuma Koga | Fast Track Racing | Toyota | 38 | 0 | Running | 78 |
| 17 | 17 | 10 | Ed Pompa | Fast Track Racing | Toyota | 38 | 0 | Running | 27 |
| 18 | 4 | 77 | Tristan McKee | Pinnacle Racing Group | Chevrolet | 34 | 0 | Mechanical | 26 |
| 19 | 26 | 1 | Andrew Rocque | Maples Motorsports | Chevrolet | 33 | 0 | Accident | 25 |
| 20 | 12 | 99 | Michael Maples | Maples Motorsports | Chevrolet | 33 | 0 | Running | 74 |
| 21 | 19 | 03 | Alex Clubb | Clubb Racing Inc. | Ford | 31 | 0 | Running | 73 |
| 22 | 28 | 51 | Patrick Staropoli | Rick Ware Racing | Chevrolet | 28 | 0 | Running | 22 |
| 23 | 7 | 97 | Jason Kitzmiller | CR7 Motorsports | Chevrolet | 22 | 0 | Accident | 71 |
| 24 | 16 | 11 | Trent Curtis | Fast Track Racing | Chevrolet | 22 | 0 | Transmission | 20 |
| 25 | 23 | 19 | Corey Aiken | Maples Motorsports | Ford | 20 | 0 | Accident | 19 |
| 26 | 33 | 72 | Christopher Werth | CK Motorsports | Chevrolet | 19 | 0 | Oil Cooler | 18 |
| 27 | 24 | 86 | Jeff Maconi (R) | Clubb Racing Inc. | Ford | 15 | 0 | Transmission | 17 |
| 28 | 14 | 89 | Bobby Dale Earnhardt | Rise Racing | Chevrolet | 15 | 0 | Running | 66 |
| 29 | 20 | 66 | Dystany Spurlock | MBM Motorsports | Ford | 14 | 0 | Rear Axle Seal | 15 |
| 30 | 27 | 79 | Isaac Kitzmiller | ACR Motorsports | Chevrolet | 10 | 0 | Mechanical | 14 |
| 31 | 31 | 06 | Nate Moeller | Wayne Peterson Motorsports | Toyota | 9 | 0 | Mechanical | 13 |
| 32 | 18 | 01 | Craig Pellegrini Jr. | Fast Track Racing | Toyota | 5 | 0 | Mechanical | 12 |
| 33 | 22 | 48 | Brad Smith | Brad Smith Motorsports | Ford | 3 | 0 | Quit | 61 |
Official race results

=== Race statistics ===
- Lead changes: 2 among 2 different drivers
- Cautions/Laps: 2 for 6 laps
- Red flags: 0
- Time of race: 1 hour, 6 minutes and 4 seconds
- Average speed: 90.270 miles per hour (145.275 km/h)

== Standings after the race ==
Drivers' Championship standings

| | Pos | Driver | Points |
|---|---|---|---|
| | 1 | Jake Bollman | 225 |
| 1 | 2 | Ryan Vargas | 213 (–12) |
| 1 | 3 | Andy Jankowiak | 211 (–14) |
| 3 | 4 | Thomas Annunziata | 203 (–22) |
| 1 | 5 | Jason Kitzmiller | 185 (–40) |
| 7 | 6 | Isabella Robusto | 182 (–43) |
| 2 | 7 | Takuma Koga | 182 (–43) |
| 2 | 8 | Michael Maples | 177 (–48) |
| 5 | 9 | Bobby Dale Earnhardt | 152 (–73) |
| 6 | 10 | Alex Clubb | 142 (–83) |

- Note: Only the first 10 positions are included for the driver standings.

| Previous race: 2026 Alabama Manufactured Housing 200 | ARCA Menards Series; 2026 season | Next race: 2026 Owens Corning 200 |
