= 2025 General Tire 100 at The Glen =

13th race of the 2025 ARCA Menards Series

Race details
- Race 13 of 20 of the 2025 ARCA Menards Series
- Date: August 8, 2025
- Official name: 5th Annual General Tire 100 at The Glen
- Location: Watkins Glen International in Watkins Glen, New York
- Course: Permanent racing facility
- Course length: 2.454 miles (3.949 km)
- Distance: 41 laps, 100 mi (161 km)
- Scheduled distance: 41 laps, 100 mi (161 km)
- Average speed: 90.495 mph (145.638 km/h)

Pole position
Driver	Brent Crews	Joe Gibbs Racing
- Time: 1:13.105

Most laps led
Driver	Brent Crews	Joe Gibbs Racing
- Laps: 38

Winner
No. 77	Tristan McKee	Spire Motorsports

Television in the United States
- Network: FS2
- Announcers: Brent Stover and Phil Parsons

Radio in the United States
- Radio: MRN

The 2025 General Tire 100 at The Glen was the 13th stock car race of the 2025 ARCA Menards Series season, and the 5th iteration of the event. The race was held on Friday, August 8, 2025, at Watkins Glen International in Watkins Glen, New York, a 2.454 mile (3.949 km) permanent road course. The race took the scheduled 41 laps to complete. Tristan McKee, driving for Spire Motorsports, would take advantage of late-race troubles for the dominant Brent Crews, and held off the field in a one-lap shootout to earn his first career ARCA Menards Series win in his first career start. He also became the second-youngest driver to win an ARCA race at 15 years, 0 months, and 5 days. To fill out the podium, Tyler Reif, driving for Sigma Performance Services, and Kris Wright, driving for Venturini Motorsports, would finish 2nd and 3rd, respectively.

Brent Crews would dominate the entire race, winning the pole and led a race-high 38 laps before experiencing battery issues with three laps to go. He was able to continue the race but fell back to finish ninth, last of the lead lap drivers.

== Report ==
=== Background ===
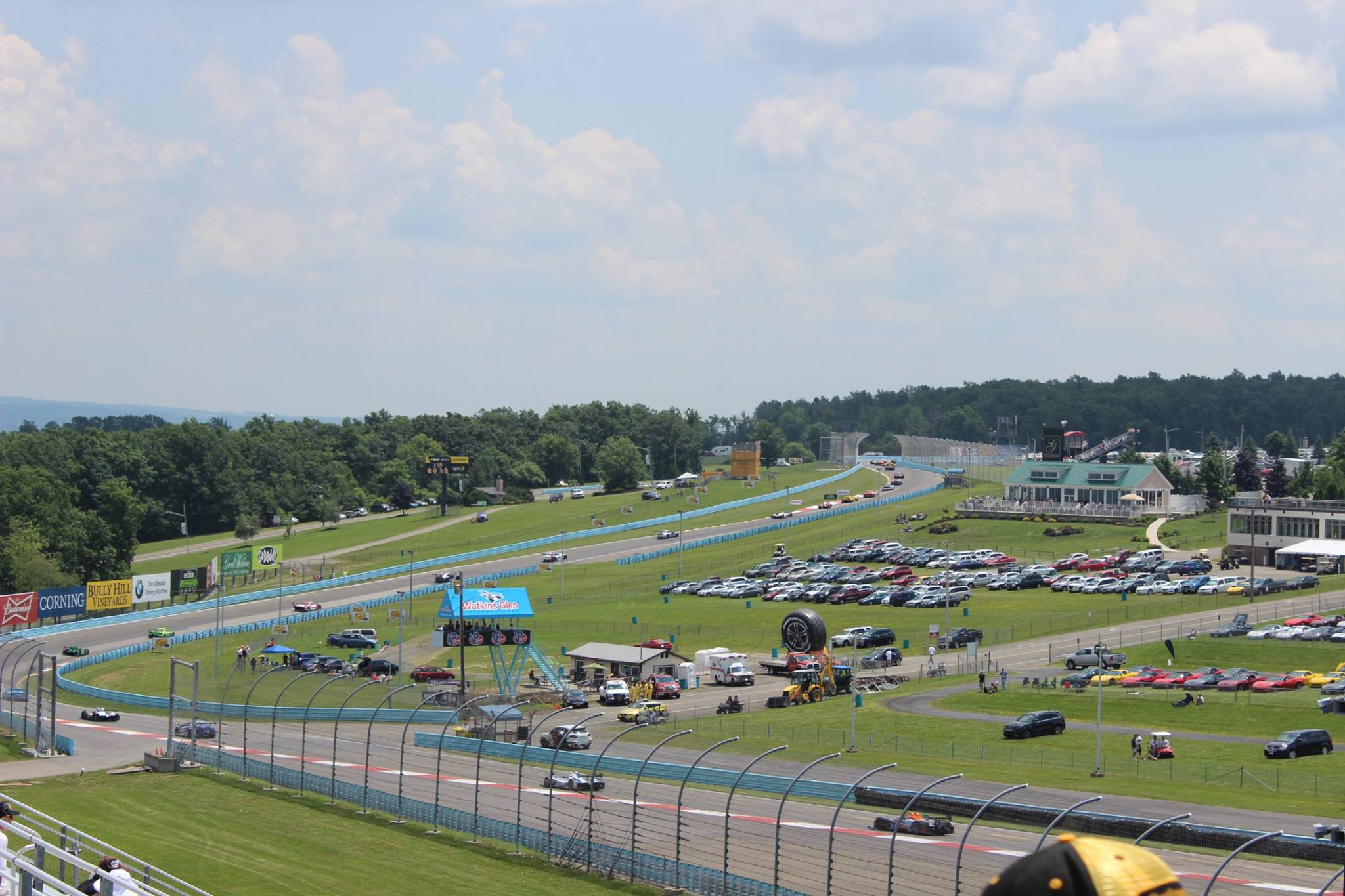
Watkins Glen International, the track where the race was held.

Watkins Glen International (nicknamed "The Glen") is an automobile race track located in Watkins Glen, New York at the southern tip of Seneca Lake. It was long known around the world as the home of the Formula One United States Grand Prix, which it hosted for twenty consecutive years (1961–1980), but the site has been home to road racing of nearly every class, including the World Sportscar Championship, Trans-Am, Can-Am, NASCAR Cup Series, the International Motor Sports Association and the IndyCar Series.

Initially, public roads in the village were used for the race course. In 1956 a permanent circuit for the race was built. In 1968 the race was extended to six hours, becoming the 6 Hours of Watkins Glen. The circuit's current layout has more or less been the same since 1971, although a chicane was installed at the uphill Esses in 1975 to slow cars through these corners, where there was a fatality during practice at the 1973 United States Grand Prix. The chicane was removed in 1985, but another chicane called the "Inner Loop" was installed in 1992 after J.D. McDuffie's fatal accident during the previous year's NASCAR Winston Cup event.

The circuit is known as the Mecca of North American road racing and is a very popular venue among fans and drivers. The facility is currently owned by International Speedway Corporation.

==== Entry list ====
- (R) denotes rookie driver.

#	Driver	Team	Make
03	Alex Clubb	Clubb Racing Inc.	Ford
4	Dale Quarterley	1/4 Ley Racing	Chevrolet
06	Brayton Laster (R)	Wayne Peterson Racing	Chevrolet
6	Lavar Scott	Rev Racing	Chevrolet
9	Trevor Ward	Fast Track Racing	Toyota
10	Ed Pompa	Fast Track Racing	Toyota
11	Matt Wilson	Fast Track Racing	Toyota
12	Trent Curtis	Fast Track Racing	Chevrolet
15	Kris Wright	Venturini Motorsports	Toyota
18	Brent Crews	Joe Gibbs Racing	Toyota
20	Lawless Alan	Venturini Motorsports	Toyota
23	Tyler Reif	Sigma Performance Services	Chevrolet
25	Alon Day	Venturini Motorsports	Toyota
28	Brenden Queen (R)	Pinnacle Racing Group	Chevrolet
29	Ryan Gemmell	NEMCO Motorsports	Toyota
34	Corey Aiken	VWV Racing	Ford
48	Brad Smith	Brad Smith Motorsports	Ford
55	Isabella Robusto (R)	Venturini Motorsports	Toyota
67	Shane Backes	Maples Motorsports	Chevrolet
70	Thad Moffitt	Nitro Motorsports	Toyota
71	Glen Reen	KLAS Motorsports	Chevrolet
72	Christopher Werth	CK Motorsports	Chevrolet
73	Andy Jankowiak	KLAS Motorsports	Chevrolet
77	Tristan McKee	Spire Motorsports	Chevrolet
86	Casey Carden	Clubb Racing Inc.	Ford
97	Jason Kitzmiller	CR7 Motorsports	Chevrolet
99	Michael Maples	Maples Motorsports	Chevrolet
Official entry list

== Practice ==
The first and only practice session was held on Friday, August 8, at 10:00 AM EST, and would last for 45 minutes. Brent Crews, driving for Joe Gibbs Racing, would set the fastest time in the session, with a lap of 1:13.620, and a speed of 119.804 mph (192.806 km/h).

Pos.	#	Driver	Team	Make	Time	Speed
1	18	Brent Crews	Joe Gibbs Racing	Toyota	1:13.620	119.804
2	77	Tristan McKee	Spire Motorsports	Chevrolet	1:14.332	118.657
3	20	Lawless Alan	Venturini Motorsports	Toyota	1:14.454	118.462
Full practice results

== Qualifying ==
Qualifying was held on Friday, August 8, at 11:00 AM EST. The qualifying procedure used is a multi-car, multi-lap based system. All drivers will be on track for a 20-minute timed session, and whoever sets the fastest time in that session will win the pole. Due to a stopped car on the track, the session was extended by 10 minutes and ended at 11:30 AM.

Brent Crews, driving for Joe Gibbs Racing, would score the pole for the race, with a lap of 1:13.105, and a speed of 120.648 mph (194.164 km/h).

=== Qualifying results ===
Pos.	#	Driver	Team	Make	Time	Speed
1	18	Brent Crews	Joe Gibbs Racing	Toyota	1:13.105	120.648
2	25	Alon Day	Venturini Motorsports	Toyota	1:13.636	119.778
3	20	Lawless Alan	Venturini Motorsports	Toyota	1:13.983	119.217
4	77	Tristan McKee	Spire Motorsports	Chevrolet	1:14.068	119.080
5	23	Tyler Reif	Sigma Performance Services	Chevrolet	1:14.295	118.716
6	55	Isabella Robusto (R)	Venturini Motorsports	Toyota	1:14.357	118.617
7	28	Brenden Queen (R)	Pinnacle Racing Group	Chevrolet	1:14.560	118.294
8	6	Lavar Scott	Rev Racing	Chevrolet	1:14.831	117.866
9	15	Kris Wright	Venturini Motorsports	Toyota	1:14.847	117.840
10	70	Thad Moffitt	Nitro Motorsports	Toyota	1:15.201	117.286
11	73	Andy Jankowiak	KLAS Motorsports	Chevrolet	1:15.291	117.145
12	29	Ryan Gemmell	NEMCO Motorsports	Toyota	1:15.358	117.041
13	4	Dale Quarterley	1/4 Ley Racing	Chevrolet	1:15.455	116.891
14	71	Glen Reen	KLAS Motorsports	Chevrolet	1:15.876	116.242
15	11	Matt Wilson	Fast Track Racing	Toyota	1:18.829	111.888
16	12	Trent Curtis	Fast Track Racing	Chevrolet	1:19.004	111.640
17	72	Christopher Werth	CK Motorsports	Chevrolet	1:20.094	110.121
18	10	Ed Pompa	Fast Track Racing	Toyota	1:22.035	107.515
19	86	Casey Carden	Clubb Racing Inc.	Ford	1:23.809	105.239
20	9	Trevor Ward	Fast Track Racing	Toyota	1:27.668	100.607
21	99	Michael Maples	Maples Motorsports	Chevrolet	1:28.173	100.031
22	06	Brayton Laster (R)	Wayne Peterson Racing	Chevrolet	1:29.149	98.935
23	67	Shane Backes	Maples Motorsports	Chevrolet	1:29.213	98.865
24	03	Alex Clubb	Clubb Racing Inc.	Ford	1:30.386	97.581
25	48	Brad Smith	Brad Smith Motorsports	Ford	1:41.250	87.111
26	34	Corey Aiken	VWV Racing	Ford	–	–
27	97	Jason Kitzmiller	CR7 Motorsports	Chevrolet	–	–
Official qualifying results

== Race results ==
Fin	St	#	Driver	Team	Make	Laps	Led	Status	Pts
1	4	77	Tristan McKee	Spire Motorsports	Chevrolet	41	3	Running	47
2	5	23	Tyler Reif	Sigma Performance Services	Chevrolet	41	0	Running	42
3	9	15	Kris Wright	Venturini Motorsports	Toyota	41	0	Running	41
4	14	71	Glen Reen	KLAS Motorsports	Chevrolet	41	0	Running	40
5	13	4	Dale Quarterley	1/4 Ley Racing	Chevrolet	41	0	Running	39
6	12	29	Ryan Gemmell	NEMCO Motorsports	Toyota	41	0	Running	38
7	11	73	Andy Jankowiak	KLAS Motorsports	Chevrolet	41	0	Running	37
8	6	55	Isabella Robusto (R)	Venturini Motorsports	Toyota	41	0	Running	36
9	1	18	Brent Crews	Joe Gibbs Racing	Toyota	41	38	Running	38
10	8	6	Lavar Scott	Rev Racing	Chevrolet	40	0	Running	34
11	2	25	Alon Day	Venturini Motorsports	Toyota	40	0	Running	33
12	3	20	Lawless Alan	Venturini Motorsports	Toyota	40	0	Running	32
13	16	12	Trent Curtis	Fast Track Racing	Chevrolet	39	0	Running	31
14	19	86	Casey Carden	Clubb Racing Inc.	Ford	38	0	Running	30
15	10	70	Thad Moffitt	Nitro Motorsports	Toyota	35	0	Running	29
16	24	03	Alex Clubb	Clubb Racing Inc.	Ford	35	0	Running	28
17	26	97	Jason Kitzmiller	CR7 Motorsports	Chevrolet	34	0	Accident	27
18	21	99	Michael Maples	Maples Motorsports	Chevrolet	34	0	Running	26
19	17	72	Christopher Werth	CK Motorsports	Chevrolet	30	0	Mechanical	25
20	15	11	Matt Wilson	Fast Track Racing	Toyota	29	0	Running	24
21	7	28	Brenden Queen (R)	Pinnacle Racing Group	Chevrolet	22	0	Running	23
22	18	10	Ed Pompa	Fast Track Racing	Toyota	20	0	Mechanical	22
23	22	06	Brayton Laster (R)	Wayne Peterson Racing	Chevrolet	15	0	Brakes	21
24	23	67	Shane Backes	Maples Motorsports	Chevrolet	13	0	Accident	20
25	20	9	Trevor Ward	Fast Track Racing	Toyota	5	0	Quit	19
26	27	34	Corey Aiken	VWV Racing	Ford	2	0	Rear Gear	18
27	25	48	Brad Smith	Brad Smith Motorsports	Ford	1	0	Handling	17
Official race results

== Standings after the race ==
Drivers' Championship standings

	Pos	Driver	Points
	1	Brenden Queen	625
	2	Lawless Alan	601 (–24)
	3	Lavar Scott	590 (–35)
	4	Jason Kitzmiller	515 (–110)
	5	Isabella Robusto	513 (–112)
	6	Alex Clubb	441 (–184)
	7	Michael Maples	429 (–196)
	8	Brayton Laster	408 (–217)
1	9	Andy Jankowiak	299 (–326)
1	10	Brad Smith	291 (–334)

- Note: Only the first 10 positions are included for the driver standings.

Previous race: 2025 Atlas 150	ARCA Menards Series; 2025 season	Next race: 2025 Allen Crowe 100
