= Hugh O'Brian Youth Leadership Foundation =

American nonprofit organization

- Established: 1958; 68 years ago
- Founder: Hugh O'Brian
- Founded at: Los Angeles
- Purpose: Empower youth to make lasting, positive change in their communities.
- Website: www.hoby.org/history/

The Hugh O'Brian Youth Leadership Foundation (HOBY) is an organization dedicated "to inspiring and developing our global community of youth and volunteers to a life dedicated to leadership, service, and innovation."

== History ==
Founded in 1958 by American actor Hugh O'Brian, the first youth leadership seminar was held in Los Angeles, California, and was held once a year until 1967. Since then, the HOBY program has spread to over 70 locations in all fifty U.S. states, and 19 countries and regions.

== Program ==
To attend seminars in the United States, a student must be chosen by their high school out of all students in that school's sophomore class. At the seminars, students participate in programs designed to enhance their leadership and teamwork skills, such as participating in volunteer activities or doing group games and puzzles. Students also meet and converse with leaders in their community in fields such as volunteerism, media, education, philanthropy, and politics, among others. They also discuss the day and their activities in small groups, as well as their life, goals, feelings, and identities. They also participate in energizing cheers in between panels and in any free time they have.

In late July, HOBY has a World Leadership Congress (WLC), which is hosted in a major U.S. city. The WLC is attended by hundreds of HOBY students from all over the world. Since its inception, over 500,000 students have attended HOBY programs from all 50 states and 15+ countries. The 2023-2024 WLC will be held in Chicago, Illinois.

== Albert Schweitzer Leadership Award ==
The Albert Schweitzer Leadership Award is presented to individuals who have distinguished themselves through service to mankind and who have contributed significantly through leading, educating and motivating youth.

Partial list of past recipients of the Albert Schweitzer Leadership Award include:

- Former Secretary of State Madeleine Albright
- Bill Austin
- George H. W. Bush
- Lynne and Richard Cheney
- Secretary of State and former First Lady Hillary Clinton
- Elizabeth and Robert Dole
- President and Mrs. Gerald R. Ford
- David Foster
- Lynn and Foster Friess
- Raisa and Mikhail Gorbachev
- Vice President and Mrs. Al Gore
- Doug Parker
- Lydia and Charlton Heston
- Dolores and Bob Hope
- J. Willard Marriott
- General Colin L. Powell (Ret.)
- President & Mrs. Ronald Reagan
- General H. Norman Schwarzkopf
- Ted Turner
- Former California Governor and Mrs. Pete Wilson
