= William F. Austin =

American businessman and philanthropist

Bill Austin
- Born: William Franklin Austin; 1942 (age 83–84); Nixa, Missouri, US
- Occupations: Businessman, philanthropist
- Title: CEO, Starkey Hearing Technologies
- Spouse: Tani Austin

William Franklin "Bill" Austin (born 1942) is an American billionaire businessman, philanthropist, and founder, principal owner, chairman and CEO of Starkey Hearing Technologies, a global hearing aid manufacturer and the largest in the United States.

== Early life ==
Austin was born in Nixa, Missouri in February 1942. His father, J. E. “Dutch” Austin, worked as a lumber trader for Georgia-Pacific, while his mother, Zola, worked in a factory. To supplement the family's income, Austin and his mother would take walks and collect bottles for recycling. During the summer, they picked blackberries and harvested foxgloves and cascara chittem bark for medicinal purposes. As he grew older, he took on a paper route and a host of other part-time jobs.

In 1961, at age 19, following an offer from an uncle to work part-time at his hearing aid shop and inspired by medical breakthroughs, Austin attended the University of Minnesota with the intent to become a doctor and one day serve the needs of the poor in the developing world. His college career was cut short, however, after one particular customer changed his life. As Austin tells it, a kind elderly gentleman bemoaned that the feedback from his hearing aid was so loud that it actually worsened his hearing, and that no one had been able to repair it. Austin was able to fashion a new earpiece and helped the man to hear again. The man was exceptionally grateful, and his face beamed with gratitude, an image that stuck with Austin. After only a few weeks in college, Austin quit school and poured his time and energy into hearing devices. “As a doctor, I could help maybe 20, 25 people a day,” Austin said. “I felt that if I did the hearing-aid business that I would be able to impact more people.”

== Career ==
In 1970, Austin paid $13,000 for Starkey Labs, which at the time was a hearing aid parts shop. He merged it with his business and under his leadership, the business thrived, owing to a dedicated commitment to innovate and provide high-quality service. Starkey offered the market's first custom, in-the-ear hearing aid, which is the product for which the company is still best known. Later, Starkey became the first hearing device manufacturer to utilize both nano and digital technology. Austin also instituted strong customer service policies, including a 90-day free-trial period. Then, in September 1983, the company's fortunes soared after one of the world's best known figures, U.S. President Ronald Reagan, was photographed wearing Starkey hearing aids. Reagan's acknowledgement that he used hearing devices led to much greater acceptance globally of hearing aid technology. That he was fitted with Starkey hearing aids caused sales to quadruple in just a few weeks.

Over time, Austin's company began expanding, both in the United States and overseas. Even as his company grew, his determination to help the poor never abated, and he began traveling to developing nations on charitable trips. At times, his trips have been without fanfare; other times, to raise awareness of the imperative for hearing solutions needed in the developing world, he has teamed with notable figures from all walks of life and all political parties. For example, in 2013, he joined former President Bill Clinton on a mission to Africa to give customized hearing devices to nearly 400 people in Zambia and Rwanda; that same year, he traveled with former President George W. Bush to provide hearing devices to more than 200 people in Dar es Salaam, Tanzania.

Some of Austin's clients have included Mother Teresa, Walter Cronkite, Arnold Palmer and Billy Graham. As of November 2019, his company had more than 6,000 employees working in 25 facilities, doing business in more than 100 markets worldwide.

== Political activity ==
Together with his spouse, Austin contributed $1 million to Donald Trump's 2020 presidential campaign.

== Personal life ==
Austin and his wife Tani currently live in Brownsville, Texas. He is the step-grandfather of William Sawalich.

== Philanthropic activities ==
In addition to his roles within Starkey Hearing Technologies, Austin spends much of his time—as much as 25 days a month—working on behalf of his nonprofit Starkey Hearing Foundation, founded in 1984 by Austin and his wife, Tani. Together, they have handed out more than one million hearing aids to the poor. His philanthropic work has been recognized globally, and he has received numerous honors and awards:

- In 2002, he received the HOBY Albert Schweitzer Leadership Award.
- In 2003, he was presented with a Caring Award from the Caring Institute.
- In 2004, he was named “Humanitarian of the Year” by the National Association for Home Care & Hospice.
- In 2005, he received the Humanitarian Award from Variety International.
- In 2006, he was awarded Honorary Doctor of Laws by Pepperdine University.
- In 2007, People Magazine noted Austin as one of its “Heroes Among Us,” and the magazine subsequently honored him in 2008 with its formal “Heroes Among Us" award.
- In 2008, the Horatio Alger Association presented Austin with its Horatio Alger Award.
- In 2009, Austin was inducted into the Science Museum of Minnesota's Science and Technology Hall of Fame.
- In 2010, Mexican President Felipe Calderon conferred to Austin its highest international honor, the Aztec Eagle Award.
- In 2011, Austin accepted the Jefferson Award for Outstanding Public Service by a Corporation on behalf of Starkey Hearing Technologies.
- In 2017, the International Federation for Peace and Sustainable Development, which is affiliated with the United Nations, named Austin as its first Goodwill Global Ambassador for Ear and Hearing Health.
- In 2018, AG Bell awarded Austin its Lifetime Achievement Award.

== See also ==
- Starkey Hearing Technologies
