= Christopher Werth =

American racing driver

- Born: September 16, 1974 (age 52); Rochester, New York, U.S.

ARCA Menards Series career
- 5 races run over 5 years
- Best finish: 99th (2024)
- First race: 2021 Clean Harbors 100 at The Glen (Watkins Glen)
- Last race: 2026 General Tire 100 at The Glen (Watkins Glen)
| Wins | Top tens | Poles |
|---|---|---|
| 0 | 0 | 0 |
- Statistics up to date as of May 8, 2026.

Christopher Werth (born September 16, 1974) is an American professional stock car racing driver and anesthesiologist. He last competed part-time in the ARCA Menards Series, driving the No. 72 Chevrolet for CK Motorsports.

== Racing career ==
In 2021, it was revealed that Werth would make his debut in the ARCA Menards Series at Watkins Glen International, driving the No. 74 Ford for Visconti Motorsports, where he started and finished two laps down in twentieth place. He returned to Watkins Glen the following year, this time driving the No. 71 Ford for CK Motorsports, where after placing fifteenth in the lone practice session, he qualified in sixteenth but finished in eighteenth after suffering a crash with Amber Balcaen with eight laps to go.

In 2024, it was revealed that Werth would return to Watkins Glen with CK Motorsports in the No. 71, this time driving a Chevrolet.

== Motorsports results ==
=== ARCA Menards Series ===
(key) (Bold – Pole position awarded by qualifying time. Italics – Pole position earned by points standings or practice time. * – Most laps led.)

ARCA Menards Series results
| Year | Team | No. | Make | 1 | 2 | 3 | 4 | 5 | 6 | 7 | 8 | 9 | 10 | 11 | 12 | 13 | 14 | 15 | 16 | 17 | 18 | 19 | 20 | AMSC | Pts | Ref |
|---|---|---|---|---|---|---|---|---|---|---|---|---|---|---|---|---|---|---|---|---|---|---|---|---|---|---|
| 2021 | Visconti Motorsports | 74 | Ford | DAY | PHO | TAL | KAN | TOL | CLT | MOH | POC | ELK | BLN | IOW | WIN | GLN; 20 | MCH | ISF | MLW | DSF | BRI | SLM | KAN | 104th | 24 | |
| 2022 | CK Motorsports | 71 | Ford | DAY | PHO | TAL | KAN | CLT | IOW | BLN | ELK | MOH | POC | IRP | MCH | GLN; 18 | ISF | MLW | DSF | KAN | BRI | SLM | TOL | 102nd | 26 | |
| 2024 | CK Motorsports | 71 | Chevy | DAY | PHO | TAL | DOV | KAN | CLT | IOW | MOH | BLN | IRP | SLM | ELK | MCH | ISF | MLW | DSF | GLN; 19 | BRI | KAN | TOL | 99th | 25 | |
| 2025 | CK Motorsports | 72 | Chevy | DAY | PHO | TAL | KAN | CLT | MCH | BLN | ELK | LRP | DOV | IRP | IOW | GLN; 19 | ISF | MAD | DSF | BRI | SLM | KAN | TOL | 123rd | 25 | |
| 2026 | CK Motorsports | 72 | Chevy | DAY | PHO | KAN | TAL | GLN; 26 | TOL | MCH | POC | BER | ELK | CHI | LRP | IRP | IOW | ISF | MAD | DSF | SLM | BRI | KAN | 125th | 18 | |
