= The Eternal Quest =

2003 novel

- Cover of the 2003 Sceptre edition
- Author: Julian Branston
- Language: English
- Publication date: 2003
- Publication place: United Kingdom

The Eternal Quest, published in the United States as Tilting at Windmills: A Novel of Cervantes and the Errant Knight, is the debut novel of Julian Branston, published in 2003. It concerns the writing of the novel Don Quixote. The U.S. title refers to a famous episode on Don Quixote where the title character comes upon a windmill and mistakes it for a giant.

== Plot summary ==
The Eternal Quest covers a short period of time in Spain in the early 17th century during the reign of King Philip III. The events in the novel circle around Miguel de Cervantes and his attempts to complete and publish the first book of Don Quixote. The Eternal Quest provides a fictionalized rendering of that time, including an intrigue to stop Cervantes from publishing his work, set in the then-capital of Valladolid. Branston takes Cervantes’ comic style and grafts it on to his miniaturization of the Don Quixote myth.

Although Cervantes himself is a character in this novel, much of the action centers on a character known only as the Old Knight, a soldier in the army of King Philip II and officer under the Duke of Alva who has gone mad from the violence of war. He now believes himself to be a soldier sent on a quest by God. Pedro, a friend of Cervantes and local trader, sees the Old Knight and tells Cervantes about him, inspiring the writer to create a series of short stories, published individually as pamphlets by the local printer Robles, about the comic adventures of a confused, self-proclaimed knight named Don Quixote.

These events are set against a backdrop of political intrigue surrounding the impending appointment of a new poet laureate to the “emperor” (King Philip III). The marquis of Denia approaches the duchess, a widow who oversees an academy of poets and artists, to boast that he controls the emperor’s appointments and will decide who the new poet laureate shall be. He is met at the duchess’ mansion by Ongora, a local poet of small talents and great ambitions, who subsequently hatches a plot to disgrace Cervantes and elevate himself into the new royal position.

The novel itself then follows three tracks:

- The meanderings of the Old Knight through Valladolid, including his encounters with the other characters and his Quixote-like confusion of ordinary objects (e.g., Pedro’s family pot) for great artifacts (the sword of Lancelot);
- The efforts by Cervantes to complete his work and maintain his reputation, even as the Old Knight appears to come to life from his pamphlets; and
- Ongora’s plot, which involves having the duchess write a satire of Don Quixote in the form of a rejection letter from Dulcinea, with Ongora himself writing a scathing introduction in which he claims to have cuckolded Cervantes, and publishing both anonymously.

The Old Knight’s misadventures take on a mystical quality, as he defeats stronger and better-armed enemies and always seems to arrive at scenes in the nick of time to stop some evil from being done. He eventually concludes that Ongora is a warlock and calls him the “Evil Magician of Bad Verse.”

When Cervantes sees the satire and introduction, he approaches the duchess directly to offer to work with her on future writings if she will explain the reason for the violence of the introduction (which Cervantes believes was also written by the duchess). The duchess, who had not seen the introduction, then disavows Ongora and offers her financial and political support to Cervantes.

Thus spurned, Ongora hires an assassin to kill Cervantes, but this attempt is foiled by the Old Knight, who knocks the assassin out with Pedro’s pot. Ongora eventually slays the Old Knight, who dies in Cervantes’ house, only to come back to life and die permanently with his head on Cervantes’ shoulder in front of the “Holy Grail” (an olive tree in Cervantes’ yard). Ongora tries to exact one last revenge by publishing various poor imitations of Don Quixote to stain Cervantes’ reputation, but these only serve to secure Cervantes' fame. Ongora is banished from the Spanish empire and Don Quixote is published to great acclaim.
