= Dale Quarterley =

American racing driver (born 1961)

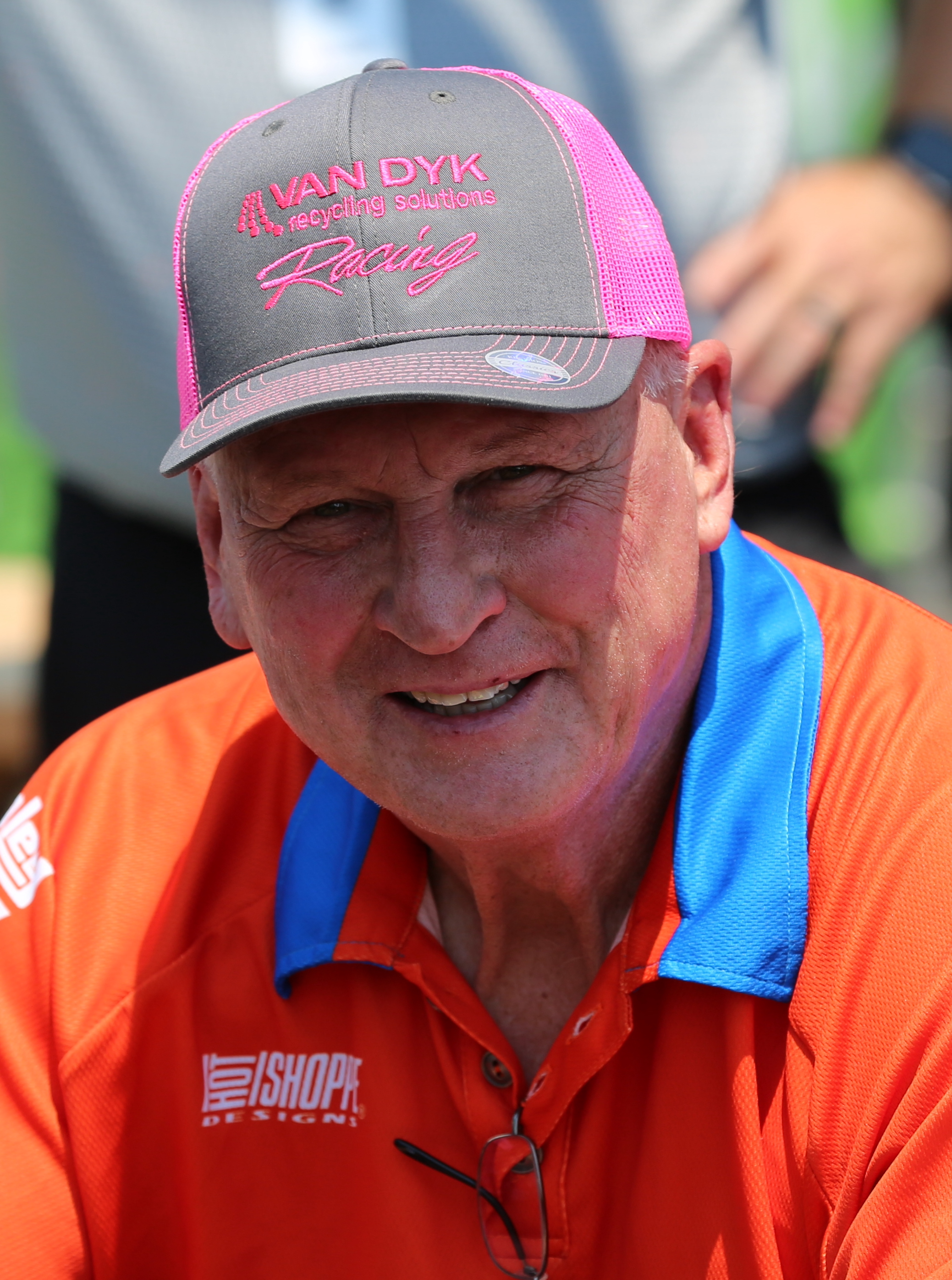
- Quarterley at Sonoma Raceway in 2025
- Born: Dale Allen Quarterley; January 25, 1961 (age 65); Westfield, Massachusetts, U.S.

NASCAR O'Reilly Auto Parts Series career
- 5 races run over 2 years
- 2008 position: 124th
- Best finish: 93rd (2005)
- First race: 2005 New England 200 (New Hampshire)
- Last race: 2008 Zippo 200 at the Glen (Watkins Glen)
| Wins | Top tens | Poles |
|---|---|---|
| 0 | 0 | 0 |

NASCAR FedEx Freight Truck Series career
- 4 races run over 3 years
- 2025 position: 70th
- Best finish: 66th (2024)
- First race: 2023 XPEL 225 (COTA)
- Last race: 2025 LiUNA! 150 (Lime Rock)
| Wins | Top tens | Poles |
|---|---|---|
| 0 | 0 | 0 |

ARCA Menards Series career
- 16 races run over 6 years
- Best finish: 31st (2023)
- First race: 2013 Ansell ActivArmr 150 (Chicagoland)
- Last race: 2025 General Tire 100 at The Glen (Watkins Glen)
| Wins | Top tens | Poles |
|---|---|---|
| 0 | 7 | 0 |

ARCA Menards Series East career
- 162 races run over 23 years
- Best finish: 3rd (2004)
- First race: 1994 GMC Trucks 200K (Lime Rock)
- Last race: 2019 Great Outdoors RV Superstore 100 (Watkins Glen)
- First win: 2001 PTM Racing 150 (Beech Ridge)
- Last win: 2004 MBNA America 150 (Dover)
| Wins | Top tens | Poles |
|---|---|---|
| 6 | 70 | 4 |

ARCA Menards Series West career
- 17 races run over 10 years
- Best finish: 25th (2023)
- First race: 2004 United Rentals 150 (Phoenix)
- Last race: 2025 Portland 112 (Portland)
| Wins | Top tens | Poles |
|---|---|---|
| 0 | 10 | 0 |
- Statistics up to date as of November 1, 2025.

Dale Allen Quarterly (born January 25, 1961) is an American professional stock car racing driver. He last competed part-time in the ARCA Menards Series West, driving the No. 32 Chevrolet SS for 1/4 Ley Racing. He has previously competed in the NASCAR Craftsman Truck Series and the ARCA Menards Series. He has also competed in the AMA Superbike Series.

== Racing career ==
=== NASCAR and ARCA ===
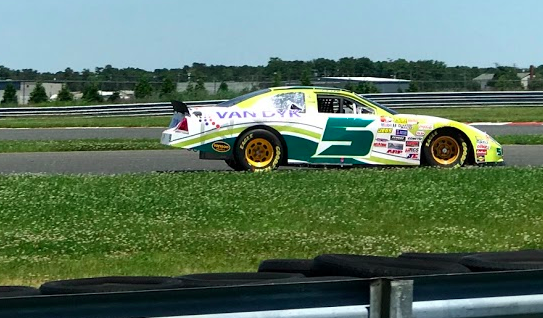
Quarterley on track during practice for the East Series race at New Jersey Motorsports Park in 2018

Quarterley's NASCAR career started in 1994 when he began competing in what was then known as the NASCAR Busch North Series. He entered his car in a race at Lime Rock Park, finishing twelfth.

Quarterley continued making sporadic Busch North starts before running the full season for the first time in 1999. He scored his first win at Beech Ridge Motor Speedway, leading all but two laps. In 2002, Quarterley nearly won at Watkins Glen International, winning the pole and leading the most laps. However, he ran out of fuel during a green-white-checker finish.

Quarterley eventually scaled back to a part-time schedule. Despite originally announcing plans to run the West Series race at Sonoma, he sat out the entire 2007 season. During the season, he served as crew chief for John Salemi.

In 2008, Quarterley drove two road course races on back-to-back weekends in the renamed Nationwide Series for Mike Harmon Racing. He finished 42nd and 41st at Circuit Gilles Villeneuve and Watkins Glen respectively.

Quarterley's 2011 season was highlighted by a second-place finish at Dover International Speedway. He was later fined, however, for a shock absorber violation on his car.

In 2018, Quarterley returned to the K&N Pro Series East after a two-year absence to compete for NextGen Motorsports in the JustDrive.com 125. He qualified fifteenth and finished thirteenth, dropping out after 43 laps with rear-end problems on the car.

To date, Quarterley has scored a total of six wins in the East Series.

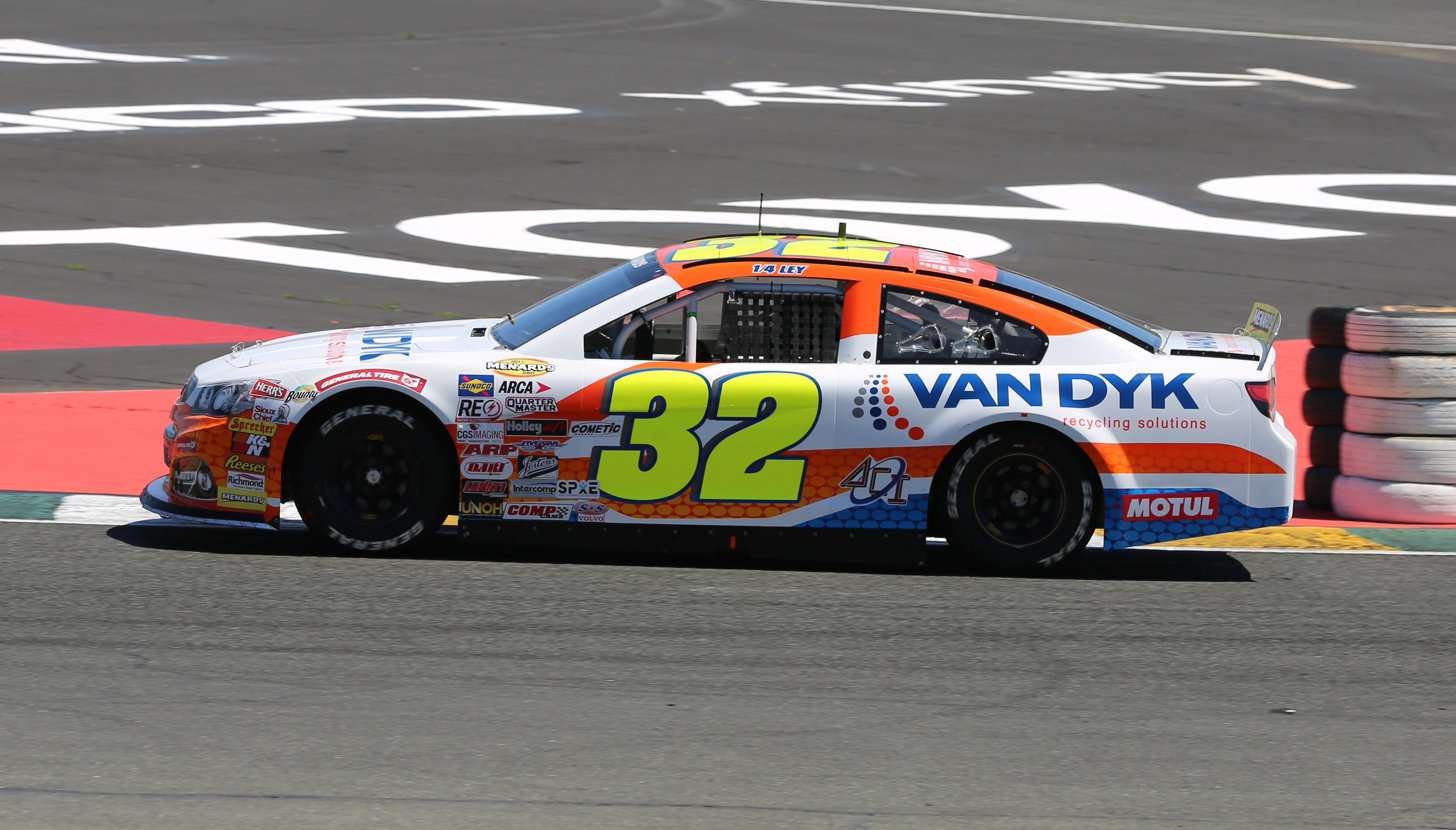
Quarterley on track at Sonoma Raceway in 2022

Quarterley returned to the ARCA Menards Series in 2021, driving the No. 3 car for Mullins Racing at the Watkins Glen road course.

In 2022, Quarterley drove in the main ARCA Series season-opener at Daytona in the No. 5 car for Bobby Gerhart Racing and in the road course races in the main ARCA Series and the West Series for his own team, 1/4 Ley Racing, in the No. 32 car although for the main ARCA Series race at Watkins Glen, AM Racing entered the race with their No. 32 car driven by Austin Wayne Self and Quarterley and his team ran the No. 4 instead.

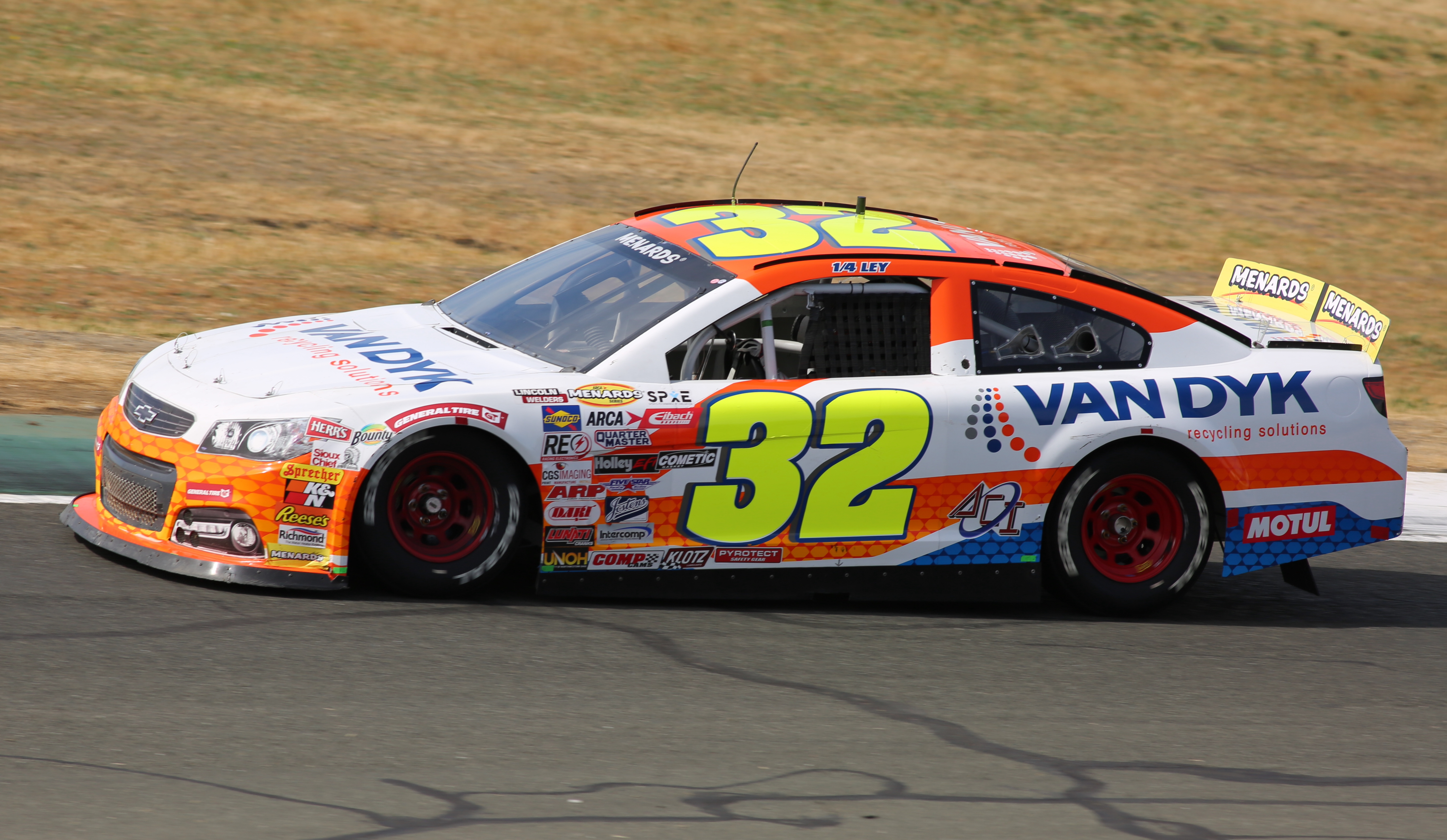
Quarterley's No. 32 ARCA car at Sonoma in 2023

On January 28, 2023, Quarterley announced that he would attempt to make his Truck Series debut in the race at COTA for his own team after buying an old Toyota from Kyle Busch Motorsports, which switched to Chevrolet for 2023. He stated in an interview with Frontstretch that although the plan was to drive for his own team, it was possible that he could partner with another team with owner points and drive for them to have a better chance of qualifying for the race. He would also return to run the road course races in the main ARCA Series and the West Series plus the main ARCA Series season-opener at Daytona, after purchasing a former superspeedway car from GMS Racing. He will also run the two main ARCA Series dirt races for the first time after buying the assets of Hendren Motorsports, which closed down after fielding a car for Ryan Unzicker, who won at Springfield in 2020 and DuQuoin in 2022, in those races for several years.

== Motorsports career results ==
=== NASCAR ===
(key) (Bold – Pole position awarded by qualifying time. Italics – Pole position earned by points standings or practice time. * – Most laps led.)

==== Nextel Cup Series ====
NASCAR Nextel Cup Series results
| Year | Team | No. | Make | 1 | 2 | 3 | 4 | 5 | 6 | 7 | 8 | 9 | 10 | 11 | 12 | 13 | 14 | 15 | 16 | 17 | 18 | 19 | 20 | 21 | 22 | 23 | 24 | 25 | 26 | 27 | 28 | 29 | 30 | 31 | 32 | 33 | 34 | 35 | 36 | NNCC | Pts | Ref |
|---|---|---|---|---|---|---|---|---|---|---|---|---|---|---|---|---|---|---|---|---|---|---|---|---|---|---|---|---|---|---|---|---|---|---|---|---|---|---|---|---|---|---|
| 2006 | CJM Racing | 72 | Dodge | DAY | CAL | LVS | ATL | BRI | MAR | TEX | PHO | TAL | RCH | DAR | CLT | DOV | POC | MCH | SON | DAY | CHI | NHA | POC | IND | GLN; DNQ | MCH | BRI | CAL | RCH | NHA | DOV | KAN | TAL | CLT | MAR | ATL | TEX | PHO | HOM | N/A | – | |

==== Nationwide Series ====
NASCAR Nationwide Series results
| Year | Team | No. | Make | 1 | 2 | 3 | 4 | 5 | 6 | 7 | 8 | 9 | 10 | 11 | 12 | 13 | 14 | 15 | 16 | 17 | 18 | 19 | 20 | 21 | 22 | 23 | 24 | 25 | 26 | 27 | 28 | 29 | 30 | 31 | 32 | 33 | 34 | 35 | NNSC | Pts | Ref |
|---|---|---|---|---|---|---|---|---|---|---|---|---|---|---|---|---|---|---|---|---|---|---|---|---|---|---|---|---|---|---|---|---|---|---|---|---|---|---|---|---|---|
| 1998 | 1/4 Ley Racing | 32N | Chevy | DAY | CAR | LVS | NSV | DAR | BRI | TEX | HCY | TAL | NHA | NZH | CLT | DOV | RCH | PPR | GLN; DNQ | MLW | MYB | CAL | SBO | IRP | MCH | BRI | DAR | RCH | DOV | CLT | GTW | CAR | ATL | HOM | | | | | N/A | 0 | |
| 2000 | 1/4 Ley Racing | 32 | Chevy | DAY | CAR | LVS | ATL | DAR | BRI | TEX | NSV | TAL | CAL | RCH | NHA | CLT | DOV | SBO | MYB | GLN; DNQ | MLW | NZH | PPR | GTW | IRP | MCH | BRI | DAR | RCH | DOV | CLT | CAR | MEM | PHO | HOM | | | | N/A | – | |
| 2005 | MacDonald Motorsports | 72 | Chevy | DAY | CAL | MXC | LVS | ATL | NSH | BRI | TEX | PHO | TAL | DAR | RCH | CLT | DOV | NSH | KEN | MLW | DAY | CHI | NHA; 25 | PPR; DNQ | GTW; 28 | IRP | GLN | MCH | BRI | CAL | RCH | | | | | | | | 93rd | 204 | |
| 2005 | MacDonald Motorsports | 71 | Chevy | | | | | | | | | | | | | | | | | | | | | PPR; 42 | | | | | | | | DOV; DNQ | KAN | CLT | MEM | TEX | PHO | HOM | 93rd | 204 | |
| 2008 | Mike Harmon Racing | 84 | Chevy | DAY | CAL | LVS | ATL | BRI | NSH | TEX | PHO | MXC | TAL | RCH | DAR | CLT | DOV | NSH | KEN | MLW | NHA | DAY | CHI | GTW | IRP | CGV; 42 | GLN; 41 | MCH | BRI | CAL | RCH | DOV | KAN | CLT | MEM | TEX | PHO | HOM | 124th | 77 | |

==== Craftsman Truck Series ====
NASCAR Craftsman Truck Series results
| Year | Team | No. | Make | 1 | 2 | 3 | 4 | 5 | 6 | 7 | 8 | 9 | 10 | 11 | 12 | 13 | 14 | 15 | 16 | 17 | 18 | 19 | 20 | 21 | 22 | 23 | 24 | 25 | NCTC | Pts | Ref |
|---|---|---|---|---|---|---|---|---|---|---|---|---|---|---|---|---|---|---|---|---|---|---|---|---|---|---|---|---|---|---|---|
| 2023 | G2G Racing | 46 | Toyota | DAY | LVS | ATL | COA; 28 | TEX | BRD | MAR | KAN | DAR | NWS | CLT | GTW | NSH | MOH; 35 | POC | RCH | IRP | MLW | KAN | BRI | TAL | HOM | PHO | | | 69th | 11 | |
| 2024 | Young's Motorsports | 12 | Toyota | DAY | ATL | LVS | BRI | COA; 26 | MAR | TEX | KAN | DAR | NWS | CLT | GTW | NSH | POC | IRP | RCH | MLW | BRI | KAN | TAL | HOM | MAR | PHO | | | 66th | 11 | |
| 2025 | 1/4 Ley Racing | 32 | Chevy | DAY | ATL | LVS | HOM | MAR | BRI | CAR | TEX | KAN | NWS | CLT | NSH | MCH | POC | LRP; 32 | IRP | GLN | RCH | DAR | BRI | NHA | ROV | TAL | MAR | PHO | 70th | 5 | |

^{*} Season still in progress
^{1} Ineligible for series points

=== ARCA Menards Series ===
(key) (Bold – Pole position awarded by qualifying time. Italics – Pole position earned by points standings or practice time. * – Most laps led.)

ARCA Menards Series results
| Year | Team | No. | Make | 1 | 2 | 3 | 4 | 5 | 6 | 7 | 8 | 9 | 10 | 11 | 12 | 13 | 14 | 15 | 16 | 17 | 18 | 19 | 20 | 21 | AMSC | Pts | Ref |
|---|---|---|---|---|---|---|---|---|---|---|---|---|---|---|---|---|---|---|---|---|---|---|---|---|---|---|---|
| 2013 | Derrike Cope Racing | 86 | Chevy | DAY | MOB | SLM | TAL | TOL | ELK | POC | MCH | ROA | WIN | CHI; 12 | NJE | POC | BLN | ISF | MAD | DSF | IOW | SLM | KEN | KAN | 109th | 170 | |
| 2021 | Mullins Racing | 3 | Chevy | DAY | PHO | TAL | KAN | TOL | CLT | MOH | POC | ELK | BLN | IOW | WIN | GLN; 25 | MCH | ISF | MLW | DSF | BRI | SLM | KAN | | 115th | 19 | |
| 2022 | Bobby Gerhart Racing | 5 | Chevy | DAY; 12 | PHO | TAL | KAN | CLT | IOW | BLN | ELK | | | | | | | | | | | | | | 36th | 101 | |
| 2022 | 1/4 Ley Racing | 32 | Chevy | | | | | | | | | MOH; 10 | POC | IRP | MCH | | | | | | | | | | 36th | 101 | |
| 2022 | 1/4 Ley Racing | 4 | Chevy | | | | | | | | | | | | | GLN; 9 | ISF | MLW | DSF | KAN | BRI | SLM | TOL | | 36th | 101 | |
| 2023 | 1/4 Ley Racing | 4 | Chevy | DAY; 10 | PHO | TAL | KAN | CLT | BLN | ELK | MOH; 5 | IOW | POC | MCH | IRP | GLN; 5 | ISF; 11 | MLW | DSF | KAN | BRI | SLM | TOL | | 31st | 143 | |
| 2024 | 1/4 Ley Racing | 4 | Chevy | DAY; 33 | PHO | TAL | DOV | KAN | CLT | IOW | MOH; 23 | BLN | IRP | SLM | ELK | MCH | ISF; Wth | MLW | DSF; 19 | GLN; 11 | BRI | KAN | TOL | | 47th | 90 | |
| 2025 | 1/4 Ley Racing | 4 | Chevy | DAY; 33 | PHO | TAL | KAN | CLT | MCH | BLN | ELK | LRP; 9 | DOV | IRP | IOW | GLN; 5 | ISF | MAD | DSF | BRI | SLM | KAN | TOL | | 53rd | 85 | |
| 2026 | 1/4 Ley Racing | 32 | Chevy | DAY | PHO | KAN | TAL | GLN | TOL | MCH | POC | BER | ELK | CHI | LRP; Wth | IRP | IOW | ISF | MAD | DSF | SLM | BRI | KAN | | N/A | 0 | |

==== K&N Pro Series East ====
NASCAR K&N Pro Series East results
| Year | Team | No. | Make | 1 | 2 | 3 | 4 | 5 | 6 | 7 | 8 | 9 | 10 | 11 | 12 | 13 | 14 | 15 | 16 | 17 | 18 | 19 | 20 | 21 | 22 | 23 | 24 | NKNPSEC | Pts | Ref |
|---|---|---|---|---|---|---|---|---|---|---|---|---|---|---|---|---|---|---|---|---|---|---|---|---|---|---|---|---|---|---|
| 1994 | 1/4 Ley Racing | 32 | Chevy | NHA | NHA | MND | NZH | SPE | HOL | GLN | JEN | EPP | GLN | NHA | WIS | STA | TMP | MND | WMM | RPS | LEE | NHA | LRP; 12 | | | | | 69th | 127 | |
| 1995 | 1/4 Ley Racing | 32 | Chevy | DAY | NHA | LEE | JEN | NHA | NZH | HOL | BEE | TMP | GLN | NHA | TIO | MND | GLN | EPP | RPS | LEE | STA | BEE | NHA | TMP | LRP; 35 | | | 100th | 58 | |
| 1996 | 1/4 Ley Racing | 32 | Chevy | DAY | LEE | JEN | NZH | HOL | NHA | TIO | BEE | TMP | NZH | NHA | STA | GLN; 5 | EPP | RPS | LEE | NHA; 19 | NHA; 32 | BEE | TMP | LRP; 2 | | | | 41st | 498 | |
| 1997 | 1/4 Ley Racing | 32 | Chevy | DAY | LEE; 27 | JEN | NHA | NZH | HOL | NHA; 37 | STA; 26 | BEE | TMP | NZH; 11 | TIO | | STA; 13 | THU | GLN; 31 | EPP | RPS | BEE | TMP | | | | | 32nd | 934 | |
| 1997 | 1/4 Ley Racing | 60 | Chevy | | | | | | | | | | | | | NHA; 7 | | | | | | | | NHA; 6 | LRP; 33 | | | 32nd | 934 | |
| 1998 | 1/4 Ley Racing | 32 | Chevy | LEE; 14 | RPS | NHA; DNQ | NZH | HOL | GLN; DNQ | STA; DNQ | NHA; 26 | DOV; 7 | STA; 25 | NHA; 18 | GLN; 39 | EPP | JEN | NHA; 42 | THU; DNQ | TMP; 14 | BEE; 18 | LRP; 33 | | | | | | 26th | 1153 | |
| 1999 | 1/4 Ley Racing | 32 | Chevy | LEE; 21 | RPS; 14 | NHA; 10 | TMP; 29 | NZH | HOL; 10 | BEE; 20 | JEN; 9 | GLN | STA; 27 | NHA; 36 | NZH; 24 | STA; 3 | **NHA**; 2 | GLN; 8 | EPP; 19 | THU; 21 | BEE; 30 | NHA; 6 | LRP; 26 | | | | | 13th | 2025 | |
| 2000 | 1/4 Ley Racing | 32 | Chevy | LEE; 26 | NHA; 2 | SEE; 26 | HOL; 21 | BEE; 25 | JEN; 24 | GLN; DNQ | STA; 12 | NHA; 4 | NZH | STA; 23 | WFD; 10 | GLN; 3 | EPP; 18 | TMP; 33 | THU; 14 | BEE; 9 | NHA; 24 | LRP; 2 | | | | | | 11th | 1992 | |
| 2001 | 1/4 Ley Racing | 32 | Chevy | LEE; 25 | NHA; 7 | SEE; 8 | HOL; 12 | BEE; 9 | EPP; 8 | STA; 15 | WFD; 14 | BEE; 3 | TMP; 5 | NHA; 5 | STA; 14 | SEE; 17 | GLN; 6 | NZH; 4 | THU; 11 | **BEE**; 1* | DOV; 6* | STA; 26 | LRP; 1 | | | | | 5th | 2765 | |
| 2002 | 1/4 Ley Racing | 32 | Chevy | **LEE**; 14 | NHA; 7 | NZH; 15 | SEE; 27 | BEE; 8 | STA; 3 | HOL; 6 | WFD; 6 | TMP; 6 | NHA; 10 | STA; 4 | **GLN**; 11* | ADI; 5 | THU; 13 | BEE; 11 | NHA; 30 | DOV; 11 | STA; 4 | LRP; 7 | | | | | | 6th | 2566 | |
| 2003 | 1/4 Ley Racing | 32 | Chevy | LEE; 12 | STA; 16 | ERI; 5 | BEE; 6 | STA; 7 | HOL; 7 | TMP; 8 | NHA; 7 | WFD; 6 | SEE; 15 | **GLN**; 15* | ADI; 1 | BEE; 10 | THU; 6 | NHA; 32 | STA; 16 | **LRP**; 1 | | | | | | | | 7th | 2349 | |
| 2004 | 1/4 Ley Racing | 32 | Chevy | LEE; 17 | TMP; 4 | LRP; 2 | SEE; 18 | STA; 5 | HOL; 22* | ERI; 6 | WFD; 7 | NHA; 1 | ADI; 18 | GLN; 3 | NHA; 4 | DOV; 1 | | | | | | | | | | | | 3rd | 1908 | |
| 2005 | 1/4 Ley Racing | 32 | Chevy | STA; 6 | HOL; 22 | ERI | NHA; 14 | WFD | ADI | STA | DUB | OXF | NHA | DOV; 7 | LRP; 24 | TMP; 29 | | | | | | | | | | | | 25th | 681 | |
| 2006 | 1/4 Ley Racing | 32 | Chevy | GRE | STA | HOL | TMP | ERI | NHA; 17 | ADI; 5 | WFD | NHA; 42 | DOV; 26 | LRP; 14 | | | | | | | | | | | | | | 28th | 510 | |
| 2008 | 1/4 Ley Racing | 32 | Chevy | GRE | IOW | SBO | GLN | NHA | TMP | NSH | ADI | LRP; 25 | MFD | NHA | DOV; 14 | STA | | | | | | | | | | | | 47th | 194 | |
| 2009 | 1/4 Ley Racing | 32 | Chevy | GRE | TRI | IOW | SBO | GLN | NHA | TMP | ADI | LRP | NHA | DOV; 20 | | | | | | | | | | | | | | 57th | 103 | |
| 2010 | 1/4 Ley Racing | 32 | Chevy | GRE | SBO | IOW | MAR | NHA | LRP | LEE | JFC | NHA | DOV; 5 | | | | | | | | | | | | | | | 44th | 155 | |
| 2011 | 1/4 Ley Racing | 32 | Chevy | GRE | SBO | RCH; 38 | IOW; DNQ | BGS; 11 | JFC | LGY | NHA; 19 | COL | GRE | NHA; 21 | DOV; 2 | | | | | | | | | | | | | 29th | 589 | |
| 2012 | 1/4 Ley Racing | 32 | Chevy | BRI; 19 | GRE; 21 | RCH; 32 | IOW | BGS; 20 | JFC | LGY | CNB | COL | IOW | NHA; 9 | DOV; 21 | GRE | CAR | | | | | | | | | | | 24th | 142 | |
| 2013 | 1/4 Ley Racing | 32 | Chevy | BRI | GRE | FIF | RCH | BGS | IOW | LGY | COL | IOW | VIR; 22 | GRE | NHA | DOV; 30 | | | | | | | | | | | | 34th | 71 | |
| 2013 | 1/4 Ley Racing | 32 | Ford | | | | | | | | | | | | | | RAL; 9 | | | | | | | | | | | 34th | 71 | |
| 2014 | 1/4 Ley Racing | 32 | Ford | NSM | DAY | BRI | GRE | RCH | IOW | BGS | FIF | LGY | NHA | COL | IOW | GLN | VIR; 22 | GRE | DOV; DNQ | | | | | | | | | 52nd | 35 | |
| 2015 | 1/4 Ley Racing | 32 | Chevy | NSM | GRE | BRI | IOW | BGS | LGY | COL | NHA | IOW | GLN | MOT | VIR; 8 | RCH | DOV | | | | | | | | | | | 46th | 36 | |
| 2018 | NextGen Motorsports | 5 | Chevy | NSM | BRI | LGY | SBO | SBO | MEM | NJM; 13 | TMP | NHA | IOW | | | | | | | | | | | | | | | 32nd | 62 | |
| 2018 | 1/4 Ley Racing | 32 | Chevy | | | | | | | | | | | GLN; 13 | GTW | NHA | DOV | | | | | | | | | | | 32nd | 62 | |
| 2019 | 1/4 Ley Racing | 32 | Chevy | NSM | BRI | SBO | SBO | MEM | NHA | IOW | GLN; 7 | BRI | GTW | NHA | DOV | | | | | | | | | | | | | 33rd | 37 | |

==== ARCA Menards Series West ====
ARCA Menards Series West results
| Year | Team | No. | Make | 1 | 2 | 3 | 4 | 5 | 6 | 7 | 8 | 9 | 10 | 11 | 12 | 13 | 14 | 15 | AMSWC | Pts | Ref |
|---|---|---|---|---|---|---|---|---|---|---|---|---|---|---|---|---|---|---|---|---|---|
| 2004 | 1/4 Ley Racing | 32 | Chevy | PHO; 26 | MMR | CAL | S99 | EVG | IRW | S99 | RMR | DCS | PHO | CNS | MMR | | | | 37th | 255 | |
| 2004 | 1/4 Ley Racing | 31 | Chevy | | | | | | | | | | | | | IRW; 2 | | | 37th | 255 | |
| 2005 | 1/4 Ley Racing | 32 | Chevy | PHO; 8 | MMR | PHO; 6 | S99 | IRW | EVG | S99 | PPR | CAL | DCS | CTS | MMR | | | | 30th | 297 | |
| 2011 | 1/4 Ley Racing | 32 | Chevy | PHO | AAS | MMP | IOW; DNQ | LVS | | | | | | | | | | | 75th | 138 | |
| 2011 | 1/4 Ley Racing | 32 | Ford | | | | | | SON; 9 | IRW | EVG | PIR | CNS | MRP | SPO | AAS | PHO | | 75th | 138 | |
| 2012 | 1/4 Ley Racing | 32 | Ford | PHO | LHC | MMP | S99 | IOW | BIR | LVS | SON | EVG | CNS | IOW | PIR; 8 | SMP | AAS | PHO | 59th | 36 | |
| 2013 | 1/4 Ley Racing | 32 | Ford | PHO | S99 | BIR; 6 | IOW | L44 | SON; 28 | CNS | IOW | EVG | SPO | MMP | SMP | AAS | KCR | PHO | 45th | 54 | |
| 2019 | 1/4 Ley Racing | 32 | Chevy | LVS | IRW | TUS | TUS | CNS | SON; 26 | DCS | IOW | EVG | GTW | MER | AAS | KCR | PHO | | 66th | 18 | |
| 2022 | 1/4 Ley Racing | 32 | Chevy | PHO | IRW | KCR | PIR; 15 | SON; 3 | IRW | EVG | PIR | AAS | LVS | PHO | | | | | 39th | 71 | |
| 2023 | 1/4 Ley Racing | 32 | Chevy | PHO | IRW | KCR | PIR; 3 | SON; 11 | IRW | SHA | EVG | AAS | LVS | MAD | PHO | | | | 25th | 74 | |
| 2024 | 1/4 Ley Racing | 4 | Chevy | PHO | KER | PIR; 6 | | | | | | | | | | | | | 29th | 68 | |
| 2024 | 1/4 Ley Racing | 32 | Chevy | | | | SON; 14 | IRW | IRW | SHA | TRI | MAD | AAS | KER | PHO | | | | 29th | 68 | |
| 2025 | 1/4 Ley Racing | 32 | Chevy | KER | PHO | TUC | CNS | KER | SON; 24 | TRI | PIR; 7 | AAS | MAD | LVS | PHO | | | | 37th | 57 | |
| 2026 | 1/4 Ley Racing | 32 | Chevy | KER | PHO | TUC | SHA | CNS | TRI | SON | PIR; Wth | AAS | MAD | LVS | PHO | KER | | | N/A | 0 | |

==== Whelen Modified Tour ====
NASCAR Whelen Modified Tour results
| Year | Car owner | No. | Make | 1 | 2 | 3 | 4 | 5 | 6 | 7 | 8 | 9 | 10 | 11 | 12 | 13 | 14 | 15 | 16 | 17 | 18 | 19 | 20 | 21 | NWMTC | Pts | Ref |
|---|---|---|---|---|---|---|---|---|---|---|---|---|---|---|---|---|---|---|---|---|---|---|---|---|---|---|---|
| 1996 | N/A | 00 | Chevy | TMP | STA | NZH | STA | NHA | JEN | RIV | LEE | RPS | HOL | TMP | RIV | NHA | GLN; 25 | STA | NHA | NHA | STA | FLE | TMP | | N/A | 0 | |
| 1999 | N/A | | | TMP | RPS | STA | RCH | STA | RIV | JEN | NHA | NZH | HOL | TMP | NHA | RIV | GLN | STA | RPS | TMP | NHA; DNQ | STA | MAR | TMP | N/A | – | |
| 2008 | Joe Brady | 00 | Chevy | TMP | STA | STA | TMP | NHA; 32 | SPE | RIV | STA | TMP | MAN | TMP | NHA | MAR | CHE | STA | TMP | | | | | | 67th | 67 | |
| 2010 | Wayne Darling | 52 | Chevy | TMP | STA | STA | MAR | NHA | LIM; 1 | MND | RIV | STA | TMP | BRI; 6 | NHA; 6 | STA; 17 | TMP | | | | | | | | 33rd | 597 | |
| 2011 | Ralph Solhem | 0 | Chevy | TMP | STA | STA | MND | TMP | NHA; 28 | RIV | STA | NHA | BRI | DEL | TMP | LRP | NHA | STA | TMP | | | | | | 54th | 79 | |

==== Whelen Euro Series – Elite 1 ====
NASCAR Whelen Euro Series – Elite 1 results
| Year | Team | No. | Make | 1 | 2 | 3 | 4 | 5 | 6 | 7 | 8 | 9 | 10 | 11 | 12 | NWES | Pts | Ref |
|---|---|---|---|---|---|---|---|---|---|---|---|---|---|---|---|---|---|---|
| 2018 | Mishumotors | 70 | Chevy | VAL | VAL | FRA | FRA | BRH | BRH | TOU | TOU | HOC | HOC | ZOL; 24 | ZOL; 19 | 37th | 60 | |

=== Rolex Sports Car Series ===
(key) (Races in bold indicate pole position, Results are overall/class)

Rolex Sports Car Series results
| Year | Team | Make | Engine | Class | 1 | 2 | 3 | 4 | 5 | 6 | 7 | 8 | 9 | 10 | 11 | 12 | Rank | Points | Ref |
|---|---|---|---|---|---|---|---|---|---|---|---|---|---|---|---|---|---|---|---|
| 2004 | Horizon Motorsports | Pontiac GTO | Pontiac | GT | DAY | HOM | PHO | MON | WGL | DAY (33/8) | MOH | WGL (33/8) | HOM | VIR | BAR | CAL | 82nd | 23 | |
