= Dynamics of Markovian particles =

Dynamics of Markovian particles (DMP) is the basis of a theory for kinetics of particles in open heterogeneous systems. It can be looked upon as an application of the notion of stochastic process conceived as a physical entity; e.g. the particle moves because there is a transition probability acting on it.

Two particular features of DMP might be noticed: (1) an ergodic-like relation between the motion of particle and the corresponding steady state, and (2) the classic notion of geometric volume appears nowhere (e.g. a concept such as flow of "substance" is not expressed as liters per time unit but as number of particles per time unit).

Although primitive, DMP has been applied for solving a classic paradox of the absorption of mercury by fish and by mollusks. The theory has also been applied for a purely probabilistic derivation of the fundamental physical principle: conservation of mass; this might be looked upon as a contribution to the old and ongoing discussion of the relation between physics and probability theory.

== Sources ==
- Bergner—DMP, a kinetics of macroscopic particles in open heterogeneous systems
