= Richard Pimentel =

American advocate, public speaker

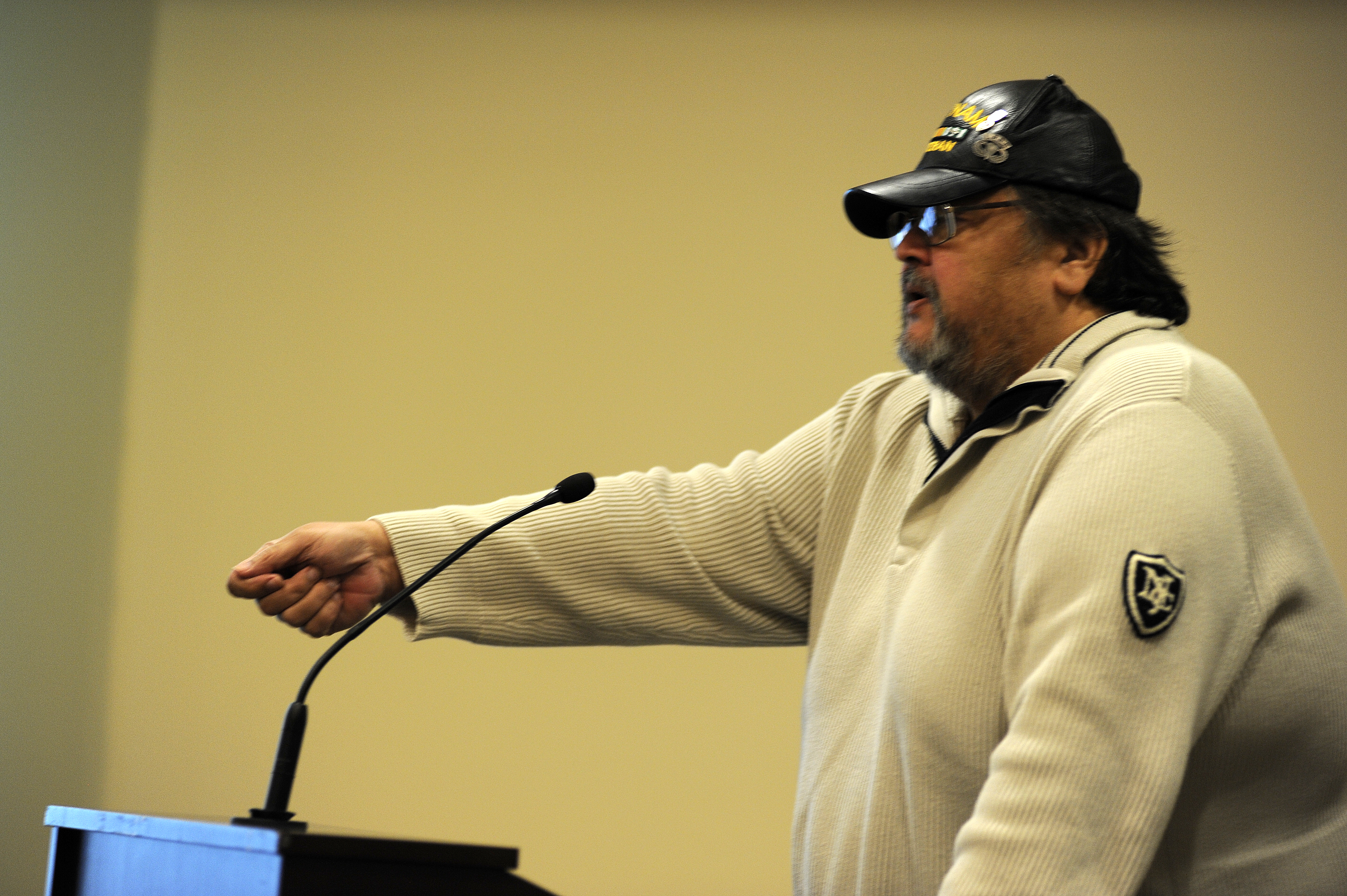
- Pimentel at a 2012 NAVAIR event
- Born: Richard Keith Pimentel c. 1948 (age 77–78); Portland, Oregon, U.S.
- Education: Portland State University
- Occupations: Activist, public speaker

Richard Keith Pimentel (born c. 1948) is an American disability rights advocate, trainer, and speaker who was a strong advocate for the passage of the Americans with Disabilities Act. He developed training materials aimed to help employers integrate persons with disabilities into the workplace.

Pimentel was born and raised in Portland, Oregon, by his grandmother, as his mother was mentally ill. He lost the majority of his hearing while serving in the Vietnam War, returning to the United States in 1970 almost entirely deaf. He attempted to apply for a rehabilitation program for veterans, but was denied by the Veterans Administration, marking the beginning of a battle with the Administration in order to allow his admittance to Portland State University.

His life story is recounted in the 2007 film Music Within. He is a senior partner of Milt Wright & Associates, Inc.

== Early life ==
Pimentel was born in Portland, Oregon. His mother was mentally ill, his father died in Richard's childhood, he temporarily stayed in a local orphanage, and was mainly raised by his grandmother. He graduated from Jefferson High School in Portland, Oregon, then enlisted in the U.S. Army, was deployed to the Vietnam War, and returned in 1970 almost completely deaf. He enrolled in a vocational rehabilitation program for veterans but, based on his deafness, the Veterans Administration declined his application to help him become a professional speaker. With support by the university's Speech and Hearing Department's professor and College Bowl founder Ben Padrow, Pimentel finally received a veteran rehabilitation grant to enroll at Portland State University.

== Career ==
Starting as a sociology class project at the university, Pimentel developed a training program for supervisors on disability issues to see if that would increase job placements of disabled people.

In 1981, he authored the disability attitude training Tilting at Windmills Training Program (Windmills) to help employers hire more people with disabilities.

Since then he trained tens of thousands of workers, supervisors, managers, and representatives of US government agencies and Fortune 500 companies on disability awareness and sensitivity, disability management, and return-to-work models for injured and recently disabled employees.

Commissioned by the President's Committee on Employment of Persons with Disabilities, the Equal Employment Opportunity Commission (EEOC), and the National Institute of Health (NIH), Pimentel co-authored AIDS in the Workplace in 1988. This attitudinal training program aimed to reduce congressional resistance to AIDS being covered by the Americans with Disabilities Act (ADA).

Shortly after the Americans with Disabilities Act (ADA) was signed into law in 1990, the chair of the U.S. Equal Employment Opportunity Commission publicly thanked Pimentel for educating employers on disability issues.

Beginning in 1997, Pimentel developed training material and acted as keynote speaker for the Marriott Foundation for People with Disabilities. The foundation's Bridges program helped place 1,200 young people with disabilities into employment each year.

Pimentel started in 2008 with designing and implementing a training program for the employers of disabled veterans returning from Iraq and Afghanistan focusing on PTSD and traumatic brain injuries.

Also in 2008, the Portland State University awarded Richard Pimentel an Honorary Doctorate in Humanities.

According to Milt Wright & Associates' website, Pimentel has been the Chairperson of VACOR, the Department of Veterans Affairs' Civilian Advisory Committee for Rehabilitation.

== In culture ==
Warner Bros. released in 2007 the full-length motion picture Music Within based on Pimentel's life story, starring Ron Livingston as Richard Pimentel and Michael Sheen as Art Honeyman.

== Publications ==
- Pimentel, Richard K.; Bissennette, Denise. Developing the New Employee: Retaining and Enhancing a Diverse Workforce. Northridge, CA: Milt Wright & Associates.
- Pimentel, Richard K. Windmills: Overcoming Fear and misperception. The Reality of working with People with disabilities (PDF). Northridge, CA: Milt Wright & Associates.
- Bissennette-Lamendella, Denise; Pimentel, Richard K. (1984). Performance Based Placement Manual. Northridge, CA: Milt Wright & Associates.
- Pimentel, Richard K. (1984). Developing jobs for persons with disabilities. Northridge, CA: Milt Wright & Associates.
- Pimentel, Richard K.; Bissennette, Denise; Wright, Anita Lee (1987). Job placement for the industrially injured worker. Northridge, CA: Milt Wright & Associates. ISBN 9780942071047.
- Pimentel, Richard (1989). "HIV and attitudes". In Corthell, David W.; Olverio, Michael (eds.). Vocational rehabilitation services to persons with H.I.V. (AIDS) (PDF). Menomonie, Wisconsin: University of Wisconsin-Stout.
- Lotito, M. J.; Pimentel, Richard (1990). The Americans with Disabilities Act: Making the ADA work for you. Northridge, CA: Milt Wright & Associates.
- Pimentel, Richard K.; Lotito, Michael (February 1992). "ADA and Workers' Compensation". Human Resource Magazine.
- Pimentel, R., Bissonnette, D., & Lotito, M. J. (1992). What Managers & Supervisors Need to Know about the ADA, Americans with Disabilities Act. Northridge, CA: Milt Wright & Associates.
- Lotito, M. J.; Alvarez, F. P.; Pimental, R. K. (1992). The Americans with Disabilities Act: Making the ADA Work for You (Revised ed.). Northridge, CA: Milt Wright & Associates. ISBN 094207114X.
- Americans with Disabilities Act: A comprehensive guide to Title I. 1992. ISBN 0942071174
- Pimentel, Richard K.; et al. (1993). The workers' compensation—ADA connection: Supervisory tools for workers' compensation cost containment that reduce ADA liability. M. Wright. ISBN 0942071247.
- Pimentel, Richard; Bell, C. G.; Lotito, M. J. (1993). The Job Placement—ADA Connection: Limiting Liabilities and Maximizing Opportunities for Training and Placement of Persons with Disabilities. Northridge, CA: Milt Wright & Associates. ISBN 0942071190.
- Pimentel, Richard K. (1995). The return to work process: A case management approach. Chatsworth, CA: Milt Wright & Associates. ISBN 9780942071337.
- Taking control process: Beyond light duty. 1995. ISBN 9780942071313
- Pimentel, Richard K. (1996). "Taking control of workers' compensation costs". The Case Manager. 7 (3): 59–64. doi:10.1016/S1061-9259(96)80087-7.
- Pimentel, Richard K. (2001). Return to work for people with stress and mental illness: A case management approach. Northridge, CA: Milt Wright & Associates. ISBN 9780942071511. OCLC 48768452.
- Pimentel, Richard K. (2001). Working with people with disabilities in a job placement/job retention environment. Northridge, CA: Milt Wright & Associates. 2011. ISBN 0942071506
- Pimentel, Richard K. (2010). The Art of Disclosing Your Disability (PDF). Northridge, CA: Milt Wright & Associates.
- O’Connor, Paul; Pimentel, Richard (4 Nov 2013). "In conversation with Richard Pimentel". Australian Government.
