= F.W. Webb Company =

American building supplies wholesaler

F.W. Webb
- Company type: Private
- Industry: plumbing, heating and HVAC products, pumps and industrial pipe, valves and fittings
- Founded: 1866
- Founder: John Stults
- Headquarters: Bedford, Massachusetts, US
- Number of locations: 100+
- Key people: Bob Mucciarone (COO), Jeff Pope (Owner)
- Revenue: $2.5B+
- Number of employees: 3500+
- Website: fwwebb.com

F.W. Webb Company, is an American wholesale distributor of plumbing, heating, HVAC, industrial, commercial, building and construction supply products in the northeastern United States.

== History ==
Founded in 1866 in Boston by John Van Ness Stults as one of the city’s first plumbing wholesalers, it evolved under various ownerships before Frank W. Webb purchased and renamed the Boston branch in 1899. Purchased in 1933 by Roger Pope, the company is now under the third generation of Pope family ownership. Today, it is headquartered in Bedford, Massachusetts, and operates over 100 locations across nine Northeastern states, serving commercial, residential and industrial clients. The company extends its reach through nearly 50 Frank Webb Home retail showrooms alongside its expansive wholesale branches. F.W. Webb has achieved steady growth through both organic expansion and strategic acquisitions, rising to become the largest distributor of its kind in the Northeast United States. Its product portfolio spans plumbing, HVAC/R, waterworks, fire protection, commercial refrigeration, process controls, propane gas equipment, pumps, and specialty industrial components. As of 2024, F.W. Webb employed over 3,500 people and generated approximately $2.5 billion in revenue, according to Forbes.

== Products and locations ==
F.W. Webb Company offers products and services to commercial and residential contractors as well as industrial and institutional professionals. Core markets include plumbing, heating, HVAC, commercial refrigeration and pipe valves fittings. The company also offers building and process controls, propane gas equipment and parts, ductwork, water systems, commercial and industrial pumps, fire protection and fabrication, thermoplastic piping and high purity (sanitary) process components.

In addition to the wholesale trade, the company serves retail customers, contractors and interior designers at Frank Webb Home Showrooms throughout the northeastern United States. These showrooms feature a range of products from different manufacturers, and include customer interaction displays configured before purchases are made, to provide immediate feedback to customers regarding design questions.

=== Sponsorships ===
The company is an official sponsor of the Boston Red Sox and the New York Yankees. F.W. Webb is also a supporter of Boston Children's Hospital and Bring Back the Trades.

=== Facilities ===
- 1973 – Dover, New Hampshire
- 1975 – Portland, Maine
- 1976 – Bangor, Maine
- 1977 – Williston, Vermont
- 1978 – Merrimack, New Hampshire
- 1981 – Plattsburgh, New York; Claremont, New Hampshire; Northampton, Massachusetts
- 1982 – Stoughton, Massachusetts; Hyannis, Massachusetts
- 1983 – Windham, New York; Newport, Vermont; Glens Falls, New York
- 1985 – Caribou, Maine; Biddeford, Maine; Conway, New Hampshire; Keene, New Hampshire
- 1983 – Lewiston, Maine
- 1986 – Albany, New York; Rutland, Vermont
- 1985 – Merrimack, New Hampshire
- 1986 – Haverhill, Massachusetts
- 1987 – Waterville, Maine
- 1988 – Sanford, Maine
- 1989 – Auburn, Maine
- 1989 – Scotia, New York; Laconia, New Hampshire; Bennington, Vermont; Hartford, Connecticut; Brockton, Massachusetts; Newport, Vermont
- 1996 – Malden, Massachusetts; Manchester, New Hampshire; Dedham, Massachusetts; Nashua, New Hampshire; Portland, Maine; Syracuse, New York
- 2000 – Cranston, Rhode Island; Portland, Maine; Hartford, Connecticut
- 2003 – Waterbury, Connecticut; Concord, New Hampshire
- 2004 – Amherst, New Hampshire
- 2005 – Laconia, New Hampshire; Warwick, Rhode Island; Woburn, Massachusetts; Manchester, New Hampshire; Ellsworth, Maine; Franklin, Connecticut; Binghamton, New York; Torrington, Connecticut; Rockland, Maine; Woburn, Massachusetts; Gilford, New Hampshire; Augusta, Maine; Methuen, Massachusetts; Biddeford, Maine; Madison, New Hampshire
- 2007—Burns Cascade Co. of Syracuse, New York
- 2009—O'Connor & Senecal (OSI) of Sutton, Massachusetts
- 2010—Control Equipment Corp. (CEC) of Cazenovia, New York
- 2011—Sachs Plumbing Supplies of Stamford, Connecticut
- 2011 – Boston, Massachusetts
- 2013 – Bergen Industrial Supply of Elmwood Park, New Jersey
- 2013 – Systemation Inc. of Fairport, New York
- 2014 – Allentown, Pennsylvania
- 2014 – Watertown Supply
- 2020 – Norwich, Connecticut
- 2021 – Danbury, Connecticut
- 2021 – West Harlem, New York
- 2022 – Buffalo, New York
- 2022 – Syracuse, New York
- 2022 – Egg Harbor Township, New Jersey
- 2023 – Philadelphia, Pennsylvania
- 2023 – Tinton Falls, New Jersey
- 2023 – Schenectady, New York
- 2023 – Maspeth (Queens), New York
- 2023 – Poughkeepsie, New York
- 2024 – Presque Isle, Maine
- 2026 - Somerdale, New Jersey

== Executive Officers ==
- Jeff Pope – President
- Bob Mucciarone – Chief Operating Officer
- Ruth Martin – Senior Vice President of Human Resources
- Brendan Monaghan – Senior Vice President of Operations
- Jeff Thompson – Senior Vice President of Purchasing
- Michael DelConte - Vice President, Heating & Gas Division
- Brendan Lilly – Vice President of eCommerce & Digital
- Ryan Heusinkveld – Vice President of Information Technology
- Sean Davis – Vice President of Marketing
- Donato Berardi - General Counsel
- Chuck Fiorino - Director of Business Development
