= Disability management program =

A disability management program, or DMP, is used by employers to assist employees who are unable to work due to injury or illness. The DMP consists of several components, however not all DMPs have all possible components. Smaller programs may only include the basic components while larger programs generally have more components. The purpose of the DMP is to benefit the employer by returning experienced, trained employees to work quickly. The central distinction required to plan and operated a DMP is between the terms "impairment" and "disability". Although physicians diagnose and treat impairments, employers determine disability.

Disability management programs are applied in different ways. Their implementation depends on a nation's social security system and disability policies.

== Germany ==
In Germany, rehabilitation and social participation for people with disabilities, or people at risk of developing a disability, are covered by Book IX of the Social Code since 2001. The focus of the legislation is on social and occupational participation in society and elimination of barriers in order to achieve equal opportunities. Book IX of the German Social Code aims at ensuring the (re)integration of people with disabilities into society and the labor market. The German disability management program, called "corporate integration management" (Betriebliches Eingliederungsmanagement), is covered by § 84 (2), Book IX, Social Code since 2004. This paragraph stresses the need for preventive measures in the workplace, as well as occupational rehabilitation, and addresses employers' responsibility in this area:

"Employers, whose workers are unable to work for longer than 6 weeks during a year, are to analyze, how the inability to work can, if possible, be overcome and with what assistance inability to work can be prevented and the job retained. The employer, the employees' representatives and the company physician are to resolve this matter together with the person in question. The introduction of disability management can be supported by premiums or subsidies." (§ 84 (2) Book IX)

== Further information ==
- Niehaus, M., Marfels, B., Vater, G., Magin, J. & Werkstetter, E. (2008). Betriebliches Eingliederungsmanagement – Studie zur Umsetzung des Betrieblichen Eingliederungsmanagements nach § 84 Abs. 2 SGB IX. Forschungsbericht 374 Sozialforschung. Berlin: Bundesministerium für Arbeit und Soziales.
- Niehaus M. & Vater G. (2010). Aktueller Stand der Umsetzung des Betrieblichen Eingliederungsmanagements. In Badura, B., Schröder, H., Klose J. et al. (Hrsg.), Fehlzeiten-Report 2010. Vielfalt managen. Gesundheit fördern, Potenziale nutzen (S.189-196). Berlin: Springer.
- Niehaus, M., & Marfels, B. (2010). Competencies and Tasks of Disability Management Professionals in Germany. International Journal of Disability Management, 5(2), 67–72.
