= Starkey Hearing Technologies =

American company

Starkey
- Type: Private
- Industry: Hearing instruments
- Founded: 1967
- Founder: William F. "Bill" Austin
- Headquarters: Eden Prairie, Minnesota, U.S.
- Area served: Worldwide
- Key people: William F. Austin, Founder; Tani Austin, Co-Founder, Starkey Hearing Foundation; Brandon Sawalich, President and CEO
- Products: Hearing instruments
- Number of employees: ca. 5,000 (2024)
- Website: starkey.com

Starkey is an American privately owned company based in Eden Prairie, Minnesota that makes hearing aids, and is one of the largest hearing aid manufacturers in the world. As of November 2024, Starkey reported that it employed over 5,000 people across 29 facilities and operated in more than 100 markets worldwide, and is the only American-owned global hearing aid manufacturer.

== History ==
=== Early years ===
In 1967, William F. "Bill" Austin started a small hearing aid repair store after dropping out of medical school. In 1970, he purchased an ear mold company called Starkey Labs for $13,000. Starkey started manufacturing hearing aids, offering the industry's first 90-day trial period.

=== 1980–present ===
In 1983, the company's sales doubled when Ronald Reagan started wearing its hearing aids while he was president, which caused a manufacturing crisis at the company to meet demand.

Austin has personally assisted five U.S. presidents, two popes, Mother Teresa, Nelson Mandela and other notable leaders with Starkey hearing aids.

In 2015, Austin fired Starkey's then-president, Jerry Ruzicka, along with a handful of senior managers. A year later, in September 2016, federal prosecutors charged Ruzicka and four others with stealing more than $20 million from Starkey and a supplier since 2006. During the trial, Austin, who was not charged, provided false testimony to the court, causing some of his statements to be stricken from the record. In March 2018, Ruzicka was found guilty of eight charges, including mail and wire fraud, and in December 2018 was sentenced to seven years in prison. In 2016, the company reported that its business was strong despite the disruption caused by the embezzlement, with sales of $800 million the prior year. A report in the Star Tribune noted that Starkey faced challenges at that time; its number of new patent filings had fallen, it had slipped to second place in sales to the Veteran's Administration, a key market for hearing aid companies, and sales of hearing aids to consumers were shifting more to big box stores such as Costco or proprietary dealerships, but Starkey was committed to selling directly to independent audiologists.

In July 2017, Brandon Sawalich, Austin's stepson who joined Starkey in 1994, was named company president, succeeding Austin, who retained the role of CEO.

In the summer of 2017, Achintya Bhowmik joined the company as Chief Technology Officer (CTO).

According to Forbes, in 1992 Starkey’s sales had reached nearly $200 million; by 2018 sales were an estimated $850 million a year.

In April 2025, Jenni Hargraves was appointed Executive Director of Starkey Cares, the company’s corporate social responsibility and community outreach organization.

In 2025, CEO Brandon Sawalich received the Artificial Intelligence Excellence Award for his work related to the company’s use of artificial intelligence in hearing aid technology.

== Products ==
=== Current product line ===
As of October 2019, the company offers ten different hearing aid devices and several accessories. The devices include:

- Hearing & activity tracking
- Smartphone compatible
- Invisible products
- Receiver-in-canal
- Completely-in-canal
- Behind-the-ear-ear
- In-the-canal
- In-the-ear
- Tinnitus relief
- Single-sided hearing

=== Recent developments and accessories ===
In 2014, Starkey introduced Halo, a hearing aid that works with the iPhone and an associated app.

Bill Austin with a person being helped through the Starkey Hearing Foundation.

In 2016, the company introduced high-tech hearing aids with more powerful processors and software, aimed at aging baby boomers; its marketing emphasized its ability to help its users hear music well.

In 2017, the iQ product family was unveiled.

In 2018, the company introduced Livio AI, the world’s first hearing aid with embedded sensors and artificial intelligence. A multi-purpose hearing aid, Livio AI is the first device to track physical activity and cognitive health as measured by hearing aid use. Other features of Livio AI include language translation, fall detection and alerts, tap control, and other features. The product launch also included a new app, the Thrive Hearing Control app, and three new wireless accessories—the Starkey TV, the Remote and the Remote Microphone +.

In addition, Starkey offers two accessories for hearing protection: a line of digital hearing aids called SoundGear that enhance sound quality while protecting ears from sudden loud noises and custom-fit earplugs that protect workers and others from unusually loud or noisy environments.

In late 2023, Starkey introduced Genesis AI, a hearing aid platform that includes a new processor and updated signal processing architecture. According to company and trade publication reports, the platform performs a large number of automatic adjustments per hour and introduced updated motion and acoustic environment detection features.

In April 2024, Starkey launched the Signature Series, a second-generation device based on the Genesis AI platform. The device includes motion-based optimization and an automated Edge Mode+ feature and was reported to be among the company’s smallest hearing aid models at the time of release.

In October 2024, Starkey introduced Edge AI hearing aids, which feature the G2 Neuro Processor with an integrated neural processing unit (NPU). According to coverage of the launch, the platform was designed to support on-device processing related to speech and environmental sound classification.

In 2024, Starkey’s Genesis AI platform received the MedTech Breakthrough Award for Best New Technology Solution – Hearing Aid.

In 2024, Starkey’s Edge AI hearing aids became available through U.S. government healthcare systems, including the Department of Veterans Affairs, the Department of Defense, and the Indian Health Service, expanding the product’s availability to eligible veterans and service members.

Health and software features

Recent Starkey hearing aid platforms have incorporated additional health-related and software features alongside core hearing assistance functions. According to coverage of the company’s product releases, certain models include features such as fall detection, balance assessment, and step counting, reflecting a broader trend toward integrating health monitoring functions into hearing aids.

Starkey also offers a companion mobile application, the My Starkey app, which allows users to adjust device settings and monitor device status and usage information.

== Starkey Hearing Foundation ==
According to the World Health Organization, as of 2019, approximately 466 million people worldwide, including 34 million children, have disabling hearing loss. One of WHO's responses has been to build partnerships "to develop strong hearing care programmes." To address hearing loss facing those in developing nations, in 1984 Austin and his spouse, Tani Austin, founded the Starkey Hearing Foundation. In 2015, Tani Austin was honored at the United Nations by the United States Federation for Middle East Peace as Female Philanthropist of the Year.

To help raise funds, the foundation holds an annual gala that is attended by various celebrities. As of 2017, the foundation had donated one million hearing aids to those in need around the world.

During the COVID-19 pandemic, Starkey suspended its Hear Now Program and is yet to release a date to resume services.
